= National Register of Historic Places listings in Lee County, Florida =

Location of Lee County in Florida

This is a list of the National Register of Historic Places listings in Lee County, Florida.

This is intended to be a complete list of the properties and districts on the National Register of Historic Places in Lee County, Florida, United States. The locations of National Register properties and districts for which the latitude and longitude coordinates are included below, may be seen in a map.

There are 58 properties and districts listed on the National Register in the county.

This National Park Service list is complete through NPS recent listings posted November 13, 2025.

Contents: Counties in Florida (non-linked contain no National Register listings)
Alachua - Baker - Bay - Bradford - Brevard - Broward - Calhoun - Charlotte - Citrus - Clay - Collier - Columbia - DeSoto - Dixie - Duval - Escambia - Flagler - Franklin - Gadsden - Gilchrist - Glades - Gulf - Hamilton - Hardee - Hendry - Hernando - Highlands - Hillsborough (Tampa) - Holmes - Indian River - Jackson - Jefferson - Lafayette - Lake - Lee - Leon - Levy - Liberty - Madison - Manatee - Marion - Martin - Miami-Dade (Miami) - Monroe - Nassau - Okaloosa - Okeechobee - Orange - Osceola - Palm Beach - Pasco - Pinellas - Polk - Putnam - St. Johns - St. Lucie - Santa Rosa - Sarasota - Seminole - Sumter - Suwannee - Taylor - Union - Volusia - Wakulla - Walton - Washington

== Current listings ==
	Name on the Register	Image	Date listed	Location	City or town	Description
1	Alderman House	Alderman House	December 1, 1988 (#88002690)	2572 First Street; 26°38′52″N 81°51′44″W	Fort Myers	
2	Alva Consolidated Schools	Alva Consolidated Schools	June 10, 1999 (#99000695)	21291 North River Road; 26°42′58″N 81°36′36″W	Alva	Part of the Lee County MPS
3	Boca Grande Community Center	Boca Grande Community Center	March 30, 1995 (#95000306)	East of Park Avenue, between First and Second Streets; 26°44′48″N 82°15′42″W	Boca Grande	Part of the Lee County MPS
4	Boca Grande Lighthouse	Boca Grande Lighthouse	February 28, 1980 (#80000953)	South of Boca Grande on Gasparilla Island; 26°44′29″N 82°15′49″W	Boca Grande	
5	Boca Grande Quarantine Station	Boca Grande Quarantine Station	March 22, 1996 (#96000447)	833 Belcher Road; 26°43′10″N 82°15′42″W	Boca Grande	Part of the Lee County MPS
6	Bonita Springs School	Bonita Springs School	July 8, 1999 (#99000800)	10701 Dean Street; 26°20′05″N 81°46′31″W	Bonita Springs	Part of the Lee County MPS
7	Buckingham School	Buckingham School	February 17, 1989 (#89000011)	Buckingham and Cemetery Roads; 26°40′18″N 81°43′57″W	Buckingham	
8	Cabbage Key Historic District		November 12, 2015 (#15000784)	Intracoastal Waterway Marker 60 in Pine Island Sound; 26°39′22″N 82°13′25″W	Pineland	
9	Casa Rio	Casa Rio	October 24, 1996 (#96001186)	2424 McGregor Boulevard; 26°38′00″N 81°52′53″W	Fort Myers	Part of the Lee County MPS
10	Captiva School and Chapel-by-the-Sea Historic District	Captiva School and Chapel-by-the-Sea Historic District	October 23, 2013 (#13000853)	11580 Chapin Ln. 26°31′14″N 82°11′34″W	Captiva	
11	Charlotte Harbor and Northern Railway Depot	Charlotte Harbor and Northern Railway Depot	December 13, 1979 (#79000676)	Park and 4th Streets; 26°44′27″N 82°15′43″W	Boca Grande	
12	Dean Park Historic Residential District	Dean Park Historic Residential District	May 28, 2013 (#13000319)	Bounded by 1st St., Palm, Michigan & Evans Aves. 26°38′57″N 81°51′30″W	Fort Myers	
13	Demere Key		June 13, 1972 (#72000332)	Off Pine Island; 26°35′35″N 82°08′01″W	Pine Island	
14	Downtown Boca Grande Historic District	Downtown Boca Grande Historic District	August 24, 2011 (#11000577)	Bounded by Gilchrist Avenue W., 5th Street N., Palm Avenue E., & 3rd Street S., 26°45′01″N 82°15′39″W	Boca Grande	
15	Paul Lawrence Dunbar School	Paul Lawrence Dunbar School	February 24, 1992 (#92000025)	1857 High Street; 26°38′34″N 81°51′08″W	Fort Myers	
16	Edison Park Elementary School	Edison Park Elementary School	May 5, 1999 (#99000524)	2401 Euclid Avenue; 26°37′57″N 81°52′30″W	Fort Myers	Part of the Lee County MPS
17	Thomas Edison Winter Estate	Thomas Edison Winter Estate	August 12, 1991 (#91001044)	2350 McGregor Boulevard; 26°38′03″N 81°52′51″W	Fort Myers	
18	J. Colin English School	J. Colin English School	July 8, 1999 (#99000798)	120 Pine Island Road; 26°40′56″N 81°53′17″W	North Fort Myers	Part of the Lee County MPS
19	First Baptist Church of Boca Grande	First Baptist Church of Boca Grande	December 2, 2009 (#09000962)	421 4th Street West; 26°45′03″N 82°15′46″W	Boca Grande	
20	Fish Cabin at White Rock Shoals	Fish Cabin at White Rock Shoals	April 11, 1991 (#91000398)	West of Pine Island in Pine Island Sound; 26°32′41″N 82°07′19″W	St. James City	Part of the Fish Cabins of Charlotte Harbor MPS
21	Henry Ford Estate	Henry Ford Estate	September 8, 1988 (#88001822)	2400 McGregor Boulevard; 26°38′01″N 81°52′52″W	Fort Myers	
22	Fort Myers Beach School	Fort Myers Beach School	July 8, 1999 (#99000796)	2751 Oak Street; 26°26′54″N 81°56′20″W	Fort Myers Beach	Part of the Lee County MPS
23	Fort Myers Downtown Commercial District	Fort Myers Downtown Commercial District	January 26, 1990 (#89002325)	Roughly bounded by Bay and Lee Streets, Anderson Avenue, and Monroe Street; 26°38′38″N 81°52′06″W	Fort Myers	
24	Galt Island Archeological District		May 21, 1996 (#96000531)	Address Restricted; 26°30′58″N 82°06′23″W	St. James City	Part of the Archeological Resources of the Caloosahatchee Region MPS
25	Gasparilla Inn Historic District	Gasparilla Inn Historic District	March 18, 2008 (#08000205)	500 Palm Avenue; 26°45′08″N 82°15′39″W	Boca Grande	
26	Gilmer Heitman House	Gilmer Heitman House	September 27, 1996 (#96001033)	2581 1st Street; 26°38′55″N 81°51′46″W	Fort Myers	Part of the Lee County MPS
27	Hendrickson Fish Cabin at Captiva Rocks	Hendrickson Fish Cabin at Captiva Rocks	April 11, 1991 (#91000402)	West of Little Wood Key in Pine Island Sound; 26°37′42″N 82°11′29″W	Bokeelia	Part of the Fish Cabins of Charlotte Harbor MPS
28	Ice House at Captiva Rocks	Ice House at Captiva Rocks	April 11, 1991 (#91000407)	Southwest of Little Wood Key in Pine Island Sound; 26°37′35″N 82°11′07″W	Bokeelia	Part of the Fish Cabins of Charlotte Harbor MPS
29	Ice House at Point Blanco	Ice House at Point Blanco	April 11, 1991 (#91000408)	Southeast of Point Blanco Island in Pine Island Sound; 26°40′30″N 82°13′31″W	Bokeelia	Part of the Fish Cabins of Charlotte Harbor MPS
30	Jewett-Thompson House	Jewett-Thompson House	September 29, 1988 (#88001708)	1141 Wales Drive; 26°36′33″N 81°53′28″W	Fort Myers	
31	Josslyn Island Site		December 14, 1978 (#78000948)	Address Restricted; 26°37′31″N 82°09′09″W	Pineland	Part of the Archeological Resources of the Caloosahatchee Region MPS
32	Journey's End	Journey's End	March 14, 1985 (#85000554)	Beachfront at 18th Street; 26°45′44″N 82°15′57″W	Boca Grande	
33	Koreshan Unity Settlement Historic District	Koreshan Unity Settlement Historic District	May 4, 1976 (#76000599)	U.S. Route 41 at the Estero River; 26°26′02″N 81°48′43″W	Estero	
34	Larsen Fish Cabin at Captiva Rocks	Larsen Fish Cabin at Captiva Rocks	April 11, 1991 (#91000404)	West of Little Wood Key in Pine Island Sound; 26°37′46″N 82°11′29″W	Bokeelia	Part of the Fish Cabins of Charlotte Harbor MPS
35	Lee County Courthouse	Lee County Courthouse	March 16, 1989 (#89000196)	2120 Main Street; 26°38′31″N 81°52′14″W	Fort Myers	
36	Leneer Fish Cabin at Captiva Rocks	Leneer Fish Cabin at Captiva Rocks	April 11, 1991 (#91000403)	West of Little Wood Key in Pine Island Sound; 26°37′38″N 82°11′25″W	Bokeelia	Part of the Fish Cabins of Charlotte Harbor MPS
37	Halstead and Emily Lindsley House	Halstead and Emily Lindsley House	August 4, 2011 (#11000502)	1300 West 13th Street; 26°45′31″N 82°15′53″W	Boca Grande	
38	Menge-Hansen Marine Ways	Menge-Hansen Marine Ways	September 2, 2009 (#09000670)	5605 Palm Beach Boulevard; 26°41′16″N 81°47′35″W	Fort Myers	
39	McCollum Hall	McCollum Hall	April 18, 2022 (#100007618)	2701 Dr. Martin Luther King, Jr. Blvd; 26°38′28″N 81°51′28″W	Fort Myers	
40	Mound House	Mound House	March 22, 2019 (#100002723)	451 Connecticut St. 26°26′46″N 81°55′40″W	Fort Myers Beach	
41	Mound Key Site		August 12, 1970 (#70000187)	Address Restricted; 26°25′20″N 81°51′55″W	Fort Myers Beach	Part of the Archeological Resources of the Caloosahatchee Region MPS
42	Murphy-Burroughs House	Murphy-Burroughs House	August 1, 1984 (#84000898)	2505 1st Street; 26°38′49″N 81°51′57″W	Fort Myers	
43	Norton Fish Cabin at Captiva Rocks	Norton Fish Cabin at Captiva Rocks	April 11, 1991 (#91000405)	West of Little Wood Key in Pine Island Sound; 26°37′47″N 82°11′32″W	Bokeelia	Part of the Fish Cabins of Charlotte Harbor MPS
44	Olga School	Olga School	April 27, 1995 (#95000509)	South Olga Road; 26°43′03″N 81°42′47″W	Olga	Part of the Lee County MPS
45	Mark Pardo Shellworks Site		May 21, 1996 (#96000533)	Address Restricted	Bokeelia	Part of the Archeological Resources of the Caloosahatchee Region MPS
46	Pine--Aire Lodge		October 8, 2014 (#14000826)	13771 Waterfront Dr. 26°39′41″N 82°09′16″W	Bokeelia	
47	Pineland Archeological District		November 27, 1973 (#73000583)	Address Restricted	Pineland	Part of the Archeological Resources of the Caloosahatchee Region MPS
48	Punta Gorda Fish Company Cabin	Punta Gorda Fish Company Cabin	December 18, 2003 (#03001289)	Pine Island Sound; 26°37′41″N 82°11′26″W	Bokeelia	Part of the Fish Cabins of Charlotte Harbor MPS
49	Punta Gorda Fish Company Ice House	Punta Gorda Fish Company Ice House	April 20, 1989 (#89000320)	Northern shore of the entrance to Safety Harbor; 26°35′56″N 82°12′49″W	North Captiva Island	
50	Sanibel Colored School	Sanibel Colored School	July 8, 1999 (#99000797)	520 Tarpon Bay Road; 26°26′21″N 82°03′53″W	Sanibel	Part of the Lee County MPS
51	Sanibel Lighthouse and Keeper's Quarters	Sanibel Lighthouse and Keeper's Quarters	October 1, 1974 (#74000648)	Point Ybel on Sanibel Island; 26°27′10″N 82°00′51″W	Sanibel	
52	Terry Park Ballfield	Terry Park Ballfield	June 20, 1995 (#95000730)	3410 Palm Beach Boulevard; 26°39′25″N 81°50′31″W	Fort Myers	Part of the Lee County MPS
53	Tice Grammar School	Tice Grammar School	July 8, 1999 (#99000799)	4524 Tice Street; 26°40′12″N 81°49′15″W	Tice	Part of the Lee County MPS
54	William H. Towles House	William H. Towles House	May 29, 2008 (#08000463)	2050 McGregor Boulevard; 26°38′22″N 81°52′28″W	Fort Myers	
55	Tween Waters Inn Historic District	Tween Waters Inn Historic District	December 15, 2011 (#11000904)	15951 Captiva Drive; 26°30′37″N 82°11′25″W	Captiva	Part of the Lee County MPS
56	Useppa Island Site		May 21, 1996 (#96000532)	Address Restricted	Bokeelia	Part of the Archeological Resources of the Caloosahatchee Region MPS
57	Whidden Fish Cabin at Captiva Rocks		April 11, 1991 (#91000406)	West of Little Wood Key in Pine Island Sound; 26°37′35″N 82°11′24″W	Bokeelia	Part of the Fish Cabins of Charlotte Harbor MPS
58	Whidden's Marina	Whidden's Marina	December 28, 2000 (#00001539)	190 First Street East; 26°44′44″N 82°15′26″W	Boca Grande	Part of the Lee County MPS

== See also ==
- List of National Historic Landmarks in Florida
- National Register of Historic Places listings in Florida
