= Matlacha Isles-Matlacha Shores, Florida =

- Census-designated place
- Location in Lee County and the state of Florida
- Coordinates: 26°37′46″N 82°03′35″W
- Country: United States
- State: Florida
- County: Lee

Area
  - Total: 0.47 sq mi (1.22 km^{2})
  - Land: 0.20 sq mi (0.52 km^{2})
  - Water: 0.27 sq mi (0.70 km^{2})
- Elevation: 0 ft (0 m)

Population (2020)
  - Total: 227
  - Density: 1,136.8/sq mi (438.92/km^{2})
- Time zone: UTC-5 (Eastern (EST))
  - Summer (DST): UTC-4 (EDT)
- FIPS code: 12-43484
- GNIS feature ID: 2403265

Matlacha Isles-Matlacha Shores is an unincorporated community and census-designated place (CDP) in Lee County, Florida, United States. The population was 227 at the 2020 census, down from 229 at the 2010 census. It is part of the Cape Coral-Fort Myers, Florida Metropolitan Statistical Area.

== Geography ==
Matlacha Isles-Matlacha Shores is located in western Lee County on the east side of Matlacha Pass, a tidal waterway separating Pine Island and Little Pine Island from the mainland. The CDP is bordered to the north by the city of Cape Coral.

Southwest Pine Island Road (County Road 78) runs through the community, leading east 12 miles (19 km) to North Fort Myers and west across Matlacha Pass onto Little Pine Island.

According to the United States Census Bureau, the CDP has a total area of 0.47 square miles (1.22 km^{2}), of which 0.20 square miles (0.52 km^{2}) are land and 0.27 square miles (0.70 km^{2}), or 57.55%, are water.

== Demographics ==
Historical population
Census	Pop.	Note	%±
2000	304		—
2010	229		−24.7%
2020	227		−0.9%
U.S. Decennial Census

As of the census of 2000, there were 304 people, 159 households, and 96 families residing in the CDP. The population density was 1,391.5 inhabitants per square mile (537.3/km^{2}). There were 205 housing units at an average density of 938.4 per square mile (362.3/km^{2}). The racial makeup of the CDP was 99.01% White, 0.33% Native American, 0.33% Asian and 0.33% Pacific Islander. Hispanic or Latino of any race were 1.32% of the population.

There were 159 households, out of which 5.7% had children under the age of 18 living with them, 52.8% were married couples living together, 4.4% had a female householder with no husband present, and 39.6% were non-families. 34.6% of all households were made up of individuals, and 15.7% had someone living alone who was 65 years of age or older. The average household size was 1.91 and the average family size was 2.40.

In the CDP, the population was spread out, with 6.6% under the age of 18, 2.6% from 18 to 24, 15.5% from 25 to 44, 40.1% from 45 to 64, and 35.2% who were 65 years of age or older. The median age was 59 years. For every 100 females, there were 109.7 males. For every 100 females age 18 and over, there were 102.9 males.

The median income for a household in the CDP was $31,528, and the median income for a family was $36,250. Males had a median income of $22,500 versus $32,500 for females. The per capita income for the CDP was $22,116. About 7.4% of families and 4.8% of the population were below the poverty line, including none of those under the age of eighteen or sixty five or over.
