= Great Calusa Blueway =

Water trail in Florida

Coordinates: 26.581°N 82.201°W

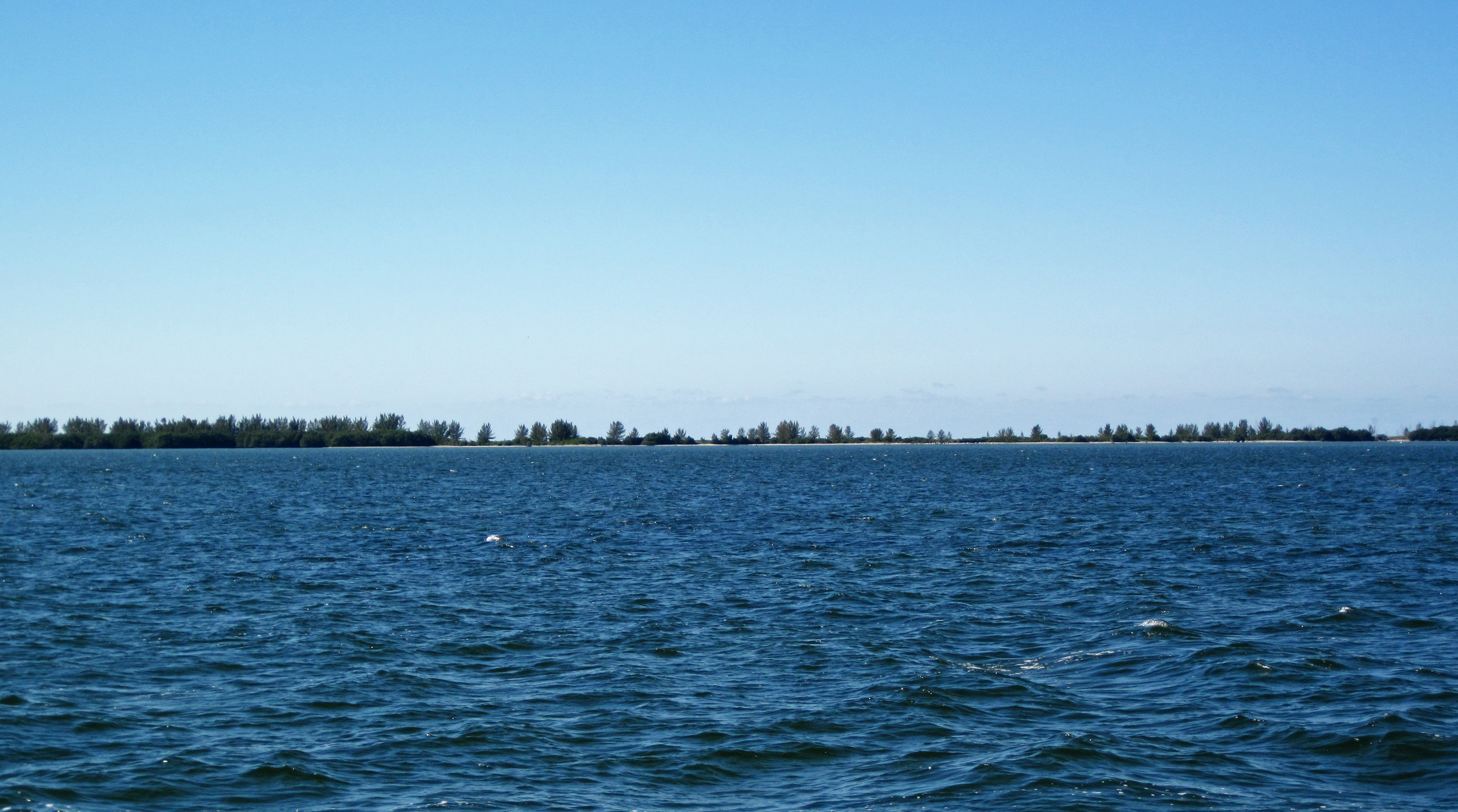
North Captiva Island, Pine Island Sound

The Great Calusa Blueway is a paddling trail in Florida for kayakers, canoers, paddle boarders and other paddlers. It covers 190 miles meandering through the coastal waters and inland tributaries of Lee County, Florida. The Calusa Blueway Paddling Festival is held to celebrate the trail.

It is named for the Calusa tribe.
