= St. James City, Florida =

- Census-designated place
- Location in Lee County and the state of Florida
- Coordinates: 26°33′15″N 82°05′50″W
- Country: United States
- State: Florida
- County: Lee

Area
  - Total: 16.68 sq mi (43.21 km^{2})
  - Land: 14.61 sq mi (37.83 km^{2})
  - Water: 2.08 sq mi (5.38 km^{2})
- Elevation: 7 ft (2.1 m)

Population (2020)
  - Total: 3,876
  - Density: 265.3/sq mi (102.45/km^{2})
- Time zone: UTC-5 (Eastern (EST))
  - Summer (DST): UTC-4 (EDT)
- FIPS code: 12-62675
- GNIS feature ID: 2402810

St. James City or Saint James City is an unincorporated community and census-designated place (CDP) on Pine Island in Lee County, Florida, United States. The population was 3,876 at the 2020 census, up from 3,784 at the 2010 census. It is part of the Cape Coral-Fort Myers, Florida Metropolitan Statistical Area.

== Geography ==
The St. James City CDP occupies the southern half of Pine Island, with the town center situated at the southern end of the island. The community is bordered by San Carlos Bay to the south, by Pine Island Sound to the west, by San Carlos Bay, Matlacha Pass, and Pine Island Creek to the east, and by the community of Pine Island Center to the north. Stringfellow Road (County Road 767) is the main road in the community, running north–south along the center of the island. By road it is 17 miles (27 km) to the middle of Cape Coral and 26 miles (42 km) to downtown Fort Myers, the Lee county seat.

According to the United States Census Bureau, the St. James City CDP has a total area of 16.7 square miles (43.2 km^{2}), of which 14.6 square miles (37.8 km^{2}) are land and 2.1 square miles (5.4 km^{2}), or 12.45%, are water.

== Demographics ==
Historical population
Census	Pop.	Note	%±
2000	4,105		—
2010	3,784		−7.8%
2020	3,876		2.4%
U.S. Decennial Census

=== 2020 census ===
As of the 2020 census, St. James City had a population of 3,876. The median age was 66.7 years. 4.7% of residents were under the age of 18 and 55.6% of residents were 65 years of age or older. For every 100 females there were 102.1 males, and for every 100 females age 18 and over there were 101.1 males age 18 and over.

52.9% of residents lived in urban areas, while 47.1% lived in rural areas.

There were 2,095 households in St. James City, of which 6.2% had children under the age of 18 living in them. Of all households, 55.5% were married-couple households, 19.3% were households with a male householder and no spouse or partner present, and 19.2% were households with a female householder and no spouse or partner present. About 31.6% of all households were made up of individuals and 21.5% had someone living alone who was 65 years of age or older.

There were 3,467 housing units, of which 39.6% were vacant. The homeowner vacancy rate was 5.2% and the rental vacancy rate was 25.4%.

Racial composition as of the 2020 census
Race	Number	Percent
White	3,619	93.4%
Black or African American	15	0.4%
American Indian and Alaska Native	7	0.2%
Asian	17	0.4%
Native Hawaiian and Other Pacific Islander	0	0.0%
Some other race	40	1.0%
Two or more races	178	4.6%
Hispanic or Latino (of any race)	143	3.7%

=== 2000 census ===
As of the 2000 census, there were 4,105 people, 2,138 households, and 1,417 families residing in the CDP. The population density was 281.1 inhabitants per square mile (108.5/km^{2}). There were 2,921 housing units at an average density of 200.0 per square mile (77.2/km^{2}). The racial makeup of the CDP was 98.95% White, 0.10% African American, 0.15% Native American, 0.27% Asian, 0.15% from other races, and 0.39% from two or more races. Hispanic or Latino of any race were 0.76% of the population.

There were 2,138 households, out of which 7.0% had children under the age of 18 living with them, 62.4% were married couples living together, 2.5% had a female householder with no husband present, and 33.7% were non-families. 28.1% of all households were made up of individuals, and 18.2% had someone living alone who was 65 years of age or older. The average household size was 1.92 and the average family size was 2.28.

In the CDP, the population was spread out, with 7.1% under the age of 18, 1.7% from 18 to 24, 10.8% from 25 to 44, 35.4% from 45 to 64, and 45.0% who were 65 years of age or older. The median age was 63 years. For every 100 females, there were 98.5 males. For every 100 females age 18 and over, there were 97.8 males.

The median income for a household in the CDP was $35,746, and the median income for a family was $42,176. Males had a median income of $34,120 versus $22,179 for females. The per capita income for the CDP was $26,520. About 1.5% of families and 4.3% of the population were below the poverty line, including 6.0% of those under age 18 and 3.8% of those age 65 or over.
