= Demere Key =

- U.S. National Register of Historic Places
- Location within Florida Location within the United States
- Location: Lee County, Florida
- Nearest city: Fort Myers
- Coordinates: 26°35′34″N 82°08′02″W
- NRHP reference No.: 72000332
- Added to NRHP: June 13, 1972

Demere Key is an archaeological site west of Pine Island, Florida. On June 13, 1972, it was added to the U.S. National Register of Historic Places.

The island is named for its early owner, Lewis Deméré (1813 – c.1880), who was born at St. Simons Island, Georgia. He and his wife, Virginia Clancy Barnard Deméré (1821–1900) and son, Raymond Barnard Deméré (1843–1905) lived on the island until about 1880.
