= Pine Island Center, Florida =

- Location in Lee County and the state of Florida
- Coordinates: 26°37′48″N 82°07′19″W
- Country: United States
- State: Florida
- County: Lee

Area
  - Total: 4.65 sq mi (12.05 km^{2})
  - Land: 4.37 sq mi (11.32 km^{2})
  - Water: 0.28 sq mi (0.73 km^{2})
- Elevation: 7 ft (2.1 m)

Population (2020)
  - Total: 1,942
  - Density: 444.3/sq mi (171.56/km^{2})
- Time zone: UTC-5 (Eastern (EST))
  - Summer (DST): UTC-4 (EDT)
- FIPS code: 12-56850
- GNIS feature ID: 2403413

Pine Island Center is an unincorporated community and census-designated place (CDP) located on Pine Island in Lee County, Florida, United States. The population was 1,942 at the 2020 census, up from 1,854 at the 2010 census. It is part of the Cape Coral-Fort Myers, Florida Metropolitan Statistical Area.

== Geography ==
Pine Island Center is located on the north-central part of Pine Island. It is bordered to the north by Pineland and Bokeelia and to the south by St. James City. The four communities together comprise all of Pine Island. To the east are Pine Island Creek and Matlacha Pass, and to the west is Pine Island Sound, all arms of the Gulf of Mexico.

The southern edge of Pine Island Center passes through the intersection of County Road 78 (Pine Island Road NW) with County Road 767 (Stringfellow Road). CR-78 leads east across Little Pine Island to the mainland and 16 miles (26 km) to North Fort Myers, while Stringfellow Road runs the length of Pine Island, 7 miles (11 km) to Bokeelia at the north end and 8 miles (13 km) to St. James City at the south end.

According to the United States Census Bureau, the Pine Island Center CDP has a total area of 4.65 square miles (12.05 km^{2}), of which 4.37 square miles (11.32 km^{2}) are land and 0.28 square miles (0.73 km^{2}), or 6.08%, are water.

== Demographics ==
Historical population
Census	Pop.	Note	%±
2000	1,721		—
2010	1,854		7.7%
2020	1,942		4.7%
U.S. Decennial Census

=== 2020 census ===
As of the 2020 census, Pine Island Center had a population of 1,942. The median age was 58.3 years. 13.0% of residents were under the age of 18 and 34.4% of residents were 65 years of age or older. For every 100 females there were 93.6 males, and for every 100 females age 18 and over there were 93.1 males age 18 and over.

0.0% of residents lived in urban areas, while 100.0% lived in rural areas.

There were 930 households in Pine Island Center, of which 10.9% had children under the age of 18 living in them. Of all households, 49.9% were married-couple households, 21.4% were households with a male householder and no spouse or partner present, and 18.6% were households with a female householder and no spouse or partner present. About 30.0% of all households were made up of individuals and 19.1% had someone living alone who was 65 years of age or older.

There were 1,215 housing units, of which 23.5% were vacant. The homeowner vacancy rate was 1.9% and the rental vacancy rate was 14.9%.

Racial composition as of the 2020 census
Race	Number	Percent
White	1,765	90.9%
Black or African American	3	0.2%
American Indian and Alaska Native	7	0.4%
Asian	16	0.8%
Native Hawaiian and Other Pacific Islander	0	0.0%
Some other race	56	2.9%
Two or more races	95	4.9%
Hispanic or Latino (of any race)	158	8.1%

=== 2000 census ===
As of the census of 2000, there were 1,721 people, 750 households, and 527 families residing in the CDP. The population density was 400.4 inhabitants per square mile (154.6/km^{2}). There were 953 housing units at an average density of 221.7 per square mile (85.6/km^{2}). The racial makeup of the CDP was 96.75% White, 1.16% Native American, 0.23% Asian, 1.16% from other races, and 0.70% from two or more races. Hispanic or Latino of any race were 2.44% of the population.

There were 750 households, out of which 23.3% had children under the age of 18 living with them, 57.1% were married couples living together, 9.2% had a female householder with no husband present, and 29.7% were non-families. 23.7% of all households were made up of individuals, and 10.0% had someone living alone who was 65 years of age or older. The average household size was 2.29 and the average family size was 2.67.

In the CDP, the population was spread out, with 20.3% under the age of 18, 5.3% from 18 to 24, 23.0% from 25 to 44, 29.1% from 45 to 64, and 22.3% who were 65 years of age or older. The median age was 46 years. For every 100 females, there were 103.7 males. For every 100 females age 18 and over, there were 101.0 males.

The median income for a household in the CDP was $37,011, and the median income for a family was $46,212. Males had a median income of $26,587 versus $30,357 for females. The per capita income for the CDP was $19,632. About 1.9% of families and 9.6% of the population were below the poverty line, including none of those under age 18 and 19.0% of those age 65 or over.
