= Cabbage Key =

Island located in Florida, USA

- Cabbage Key

Geography
- Location: Lee County, Florida
- Coordinates: 26°39′18″N 82°13′31″W
- Adjacent to: Gulf of Mexico

Administration
- United States
- State: Florida
- County: Lee

Cabbage Key is a small island located off of Pine Island, Lee County, Florida. The island is about 100 acres and has a few residences on it.

== History ==
The island is only accessible by boat, and in the 1940s, schoolchildren living on the island would be picked up by a boat to be taken to school.

The island was named Cabbage Key during this period by residents Larry and Jan Stults.
