= Bokeelia, Florida =

- Census-designated place
- Location in Lee County and the state of Florida
- Coordinates: 26°40′17″N 82°8′43″W
- Country: United States
- State: Florida
- County: Lee

Area
  - Total: 11.17 sq mi (28.92 km^{2})
  - Land: 8.95 sq mi (23.18 km^{2})
  - Water: 2.22 sq mi (5.75 km^{2})
- Elevation: 7 ft (2.1 m)

Population (2020)
  - Total: 1,855
  - Density: 207.3/sq mi (80.03/km^{2})
- Time zone: UTC-5 (Eastern (EST))
  - Summer (DST): UTC-4 (EDT)
- ZIP code: 33922
- Area code: 239
- FIPS code: 12-07375
- GNIS feature ID: 2402701

Bokeelia is an unincorporated community and census-designated place (CDP) located on Pine Island in Lee County, Florida, United States. As of the 2020 census, the CDP had a population of 1,855, up from 1,780 at the 2010 census. It is part of the Cape Coral-Fort Myers, Florida Metropolitan Statistical Area. Bokeelia is still home to one of Lee County's first pioneer families, the Padillas, who came by way of Cayo Costa.

== Geography ==
Bokeelia is located in western Lee County. It sits at the northern end of Pine Island and is bordered by water on three sides: Pine Island Sound to the west, Charlotte Harbor to the north, and Matlacha Pass to the east. Bokeelia is bordered to the south by the unincorporated communities of Pineland and Pine Island Center.

The original settlement of Bokeelia is on Bokeelia Island, connected to Pine Island by a short bridge on Stringfellow Road (County Road 767), the main road through the community, and which ends at the town's short Main Street along Charlotte Harbor. To the south Stringfellow Road leads 7 miles (11 km) to Pine Island Center, from where County Road 78 leads west to Cape Coral on the mainland.

According to the United States Census Bureau, the Bokeelia CDP has a total area of 11.2 square miles (28.9 km^{2}), of which 9.0 square miles (23.2 km^{2}) are land and 2.2 square miles (5.7 km^{2}), or 19.87%, are water.

Little Bokeelia Island, formerly owned by Charles Burgess, is a private island off Bokeelia.

== Demographics ==
Historical population
Census	Pop.	Note	%±
2000	1,997		—
2010	1,780		−10.9%
2020	1,855		4.2%
U.S. Decennial Census

=== 2020 census ===
As of the 2020 census, Bokeelia had a population of 1,855. The median age was 60.0 years. 14.1% of residents were under the age of 18 and 38.9% of residents were 65 years of age or older. For every 100 females there were 107.7 males, and for every 100 females age 18 and over there were 107.2 males age 18 and over.

0.0% of residents lived in urban areas, while 100.0% lived in rural areas.

There were 847 households in Bokeelia, of which 13.2% had children under the age of 18 living in them. Of all households, 51.2% were married-couple households, 20.3% were households with a male householder and no spouse or partner present, and 22.4% were households with a female householder and no spouse or partner present. About 32.4% of all households were made up of individuals and 20.8% had someone living alone who was 65 years of age or older.

There were 1,387 housing units, of which 38.9% were vacant. The homeowner vacancy rate was 2.9% and the rental vacancy rate was 10.1%.

Racial composition as of the 2020 census
Race	Number	Percent
White	1,435	77.4%
Black or African American	9	0.5%
American Indian and Alaska Native	9	0.5%
Asian	8	0.4%
Native Hawaiian and Other Pacific Islander	0	0.0%
Some other race	203	10.9%
Two or more races	191	10.3%
Hispanic or Latino (of any race)	418	22.5%

=== 2000 census ===
As of the census of 2000, there were 1,997 people, 907 households, and 631 families residing in the CDP. The population density was 225.7 inhabitants per square mile (87.1/km^{2}). There were 1,436 housing units at an average density of 162.3 per square mile (62.7/km^{2}). The racial makeup of the CDP was 98.05% White, 0.25% African American, 0.05% Native American, 0.30% Asian, 0.85% from other races, and 0.50% from two or more races. Hispanic or Latino of any race were 12.47% of the population.

There were 907 households, out of which 16.1% had children under 18 living with them, 60.5% were married couples living together, 5.1% had a female householder with no husband present, and 30.4% were non-families. 24.5% of all households were made up of individuals, and 12.0% had someone living alone who was 65 years of age or older. The average household size was 2.20 and the average family size was 2.55.

In the CDP, the population was spread out, with 15.0% under the age of 18, 6.7% from 18 to 24, 18.2% from 25 to 44, 31.9% from 45 to 64, and 28.2% who were 65 years of age or older. The median age was 52 years. For every 100 females, there were 110.2 males. For every 100 females aged 18 and over, there were 112.0 males.

The median income for a household in the CDP was $36,319, and the median income for a family was $42,250. Males had a median income of $24,271 versus $28,854 for females. The per capita income for the CDP was $27,613. About 12.4% of families and 17.6% of the population were below the poverty line, including 25.6% of those under age 18 and 3.2% of those aged 65 or over.
