= Halstead and Emily Lindsley House =

- U.S. National Register of Historic Places
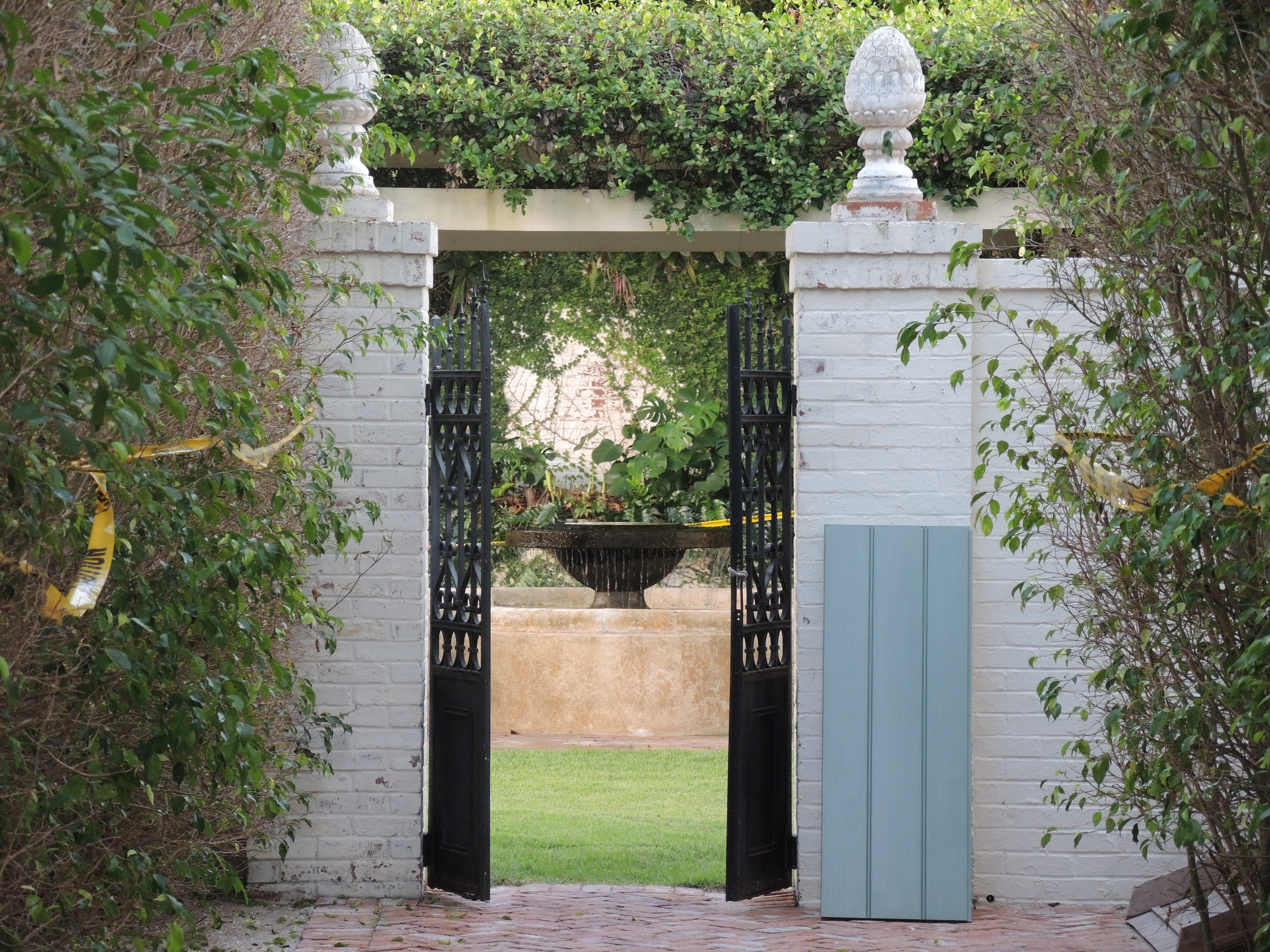
- Halstead and Emily Lindsley House

- Location within Florida Location within the United States
- Location: Boca Grande, Florida
- Coordinates: 26°45′31″N 82°15′53″W
- NRHP reference No.: 11000502
- Added to NRHP: August 4, 2011

Halstead and Emily Lindsley House is a national historic site located at 1300 West 13th Street, Boca Grande, Florida in Lee County. Built in Mediterranean Revival, it was designed by F. Burrall Hoffman, who also designed Villa Vizcaya.

It was added to the National Register of Historic Places in 2011.
