= McCollum Hall (Fort Myers, Florida) =

Historic building in Fort Myers, Florida

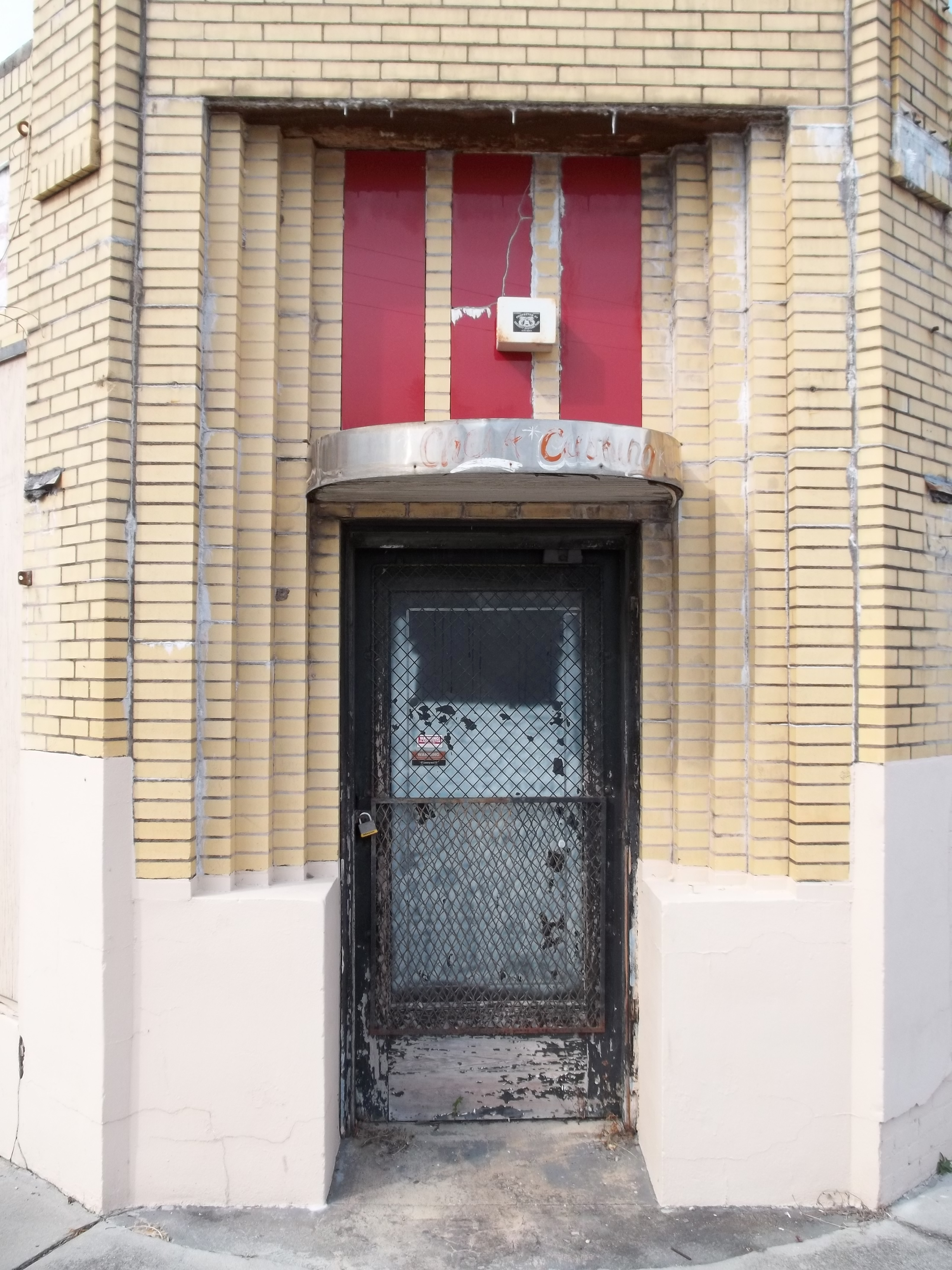
Doorway in 2011

McCollum Hall is a historic building block that was an entertainment venue in Fort Myers, Florida. It is listed on the National Register of Historic Places and is a site on Florida's Black Heritage Trail. It included a gas station and was listed in The Negro Motorist Green Book guide for African Americans. Murals are now next to it. A rope line segregated the upstairs area where performances and dancing were located. It was "at the heart" of Fort Myers' Dunbar Community. It is at 2701 Dr Martin Luther King Jr. Boulevard. It is an Art Deco style building.

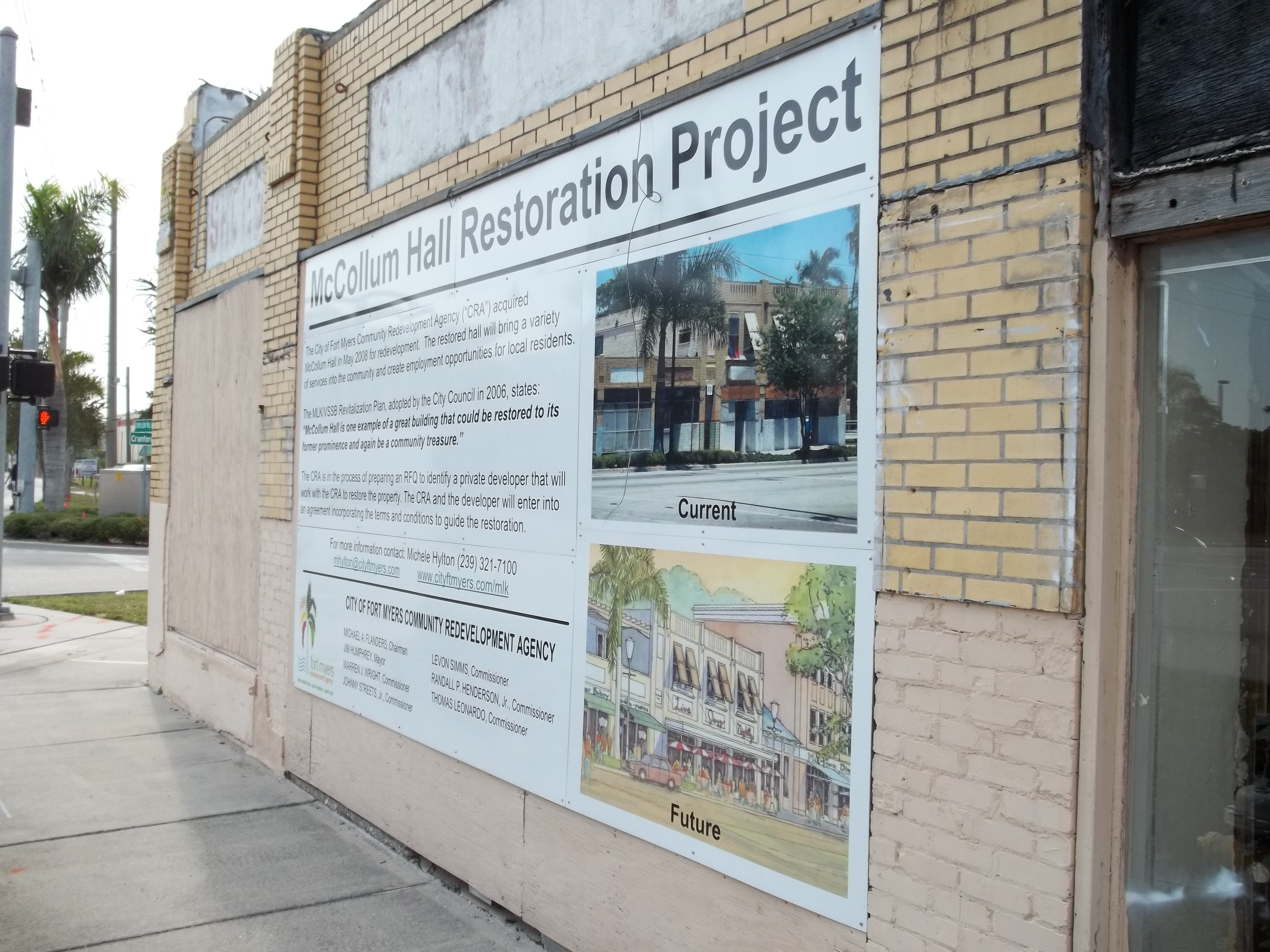
Restoration project signage in 2011

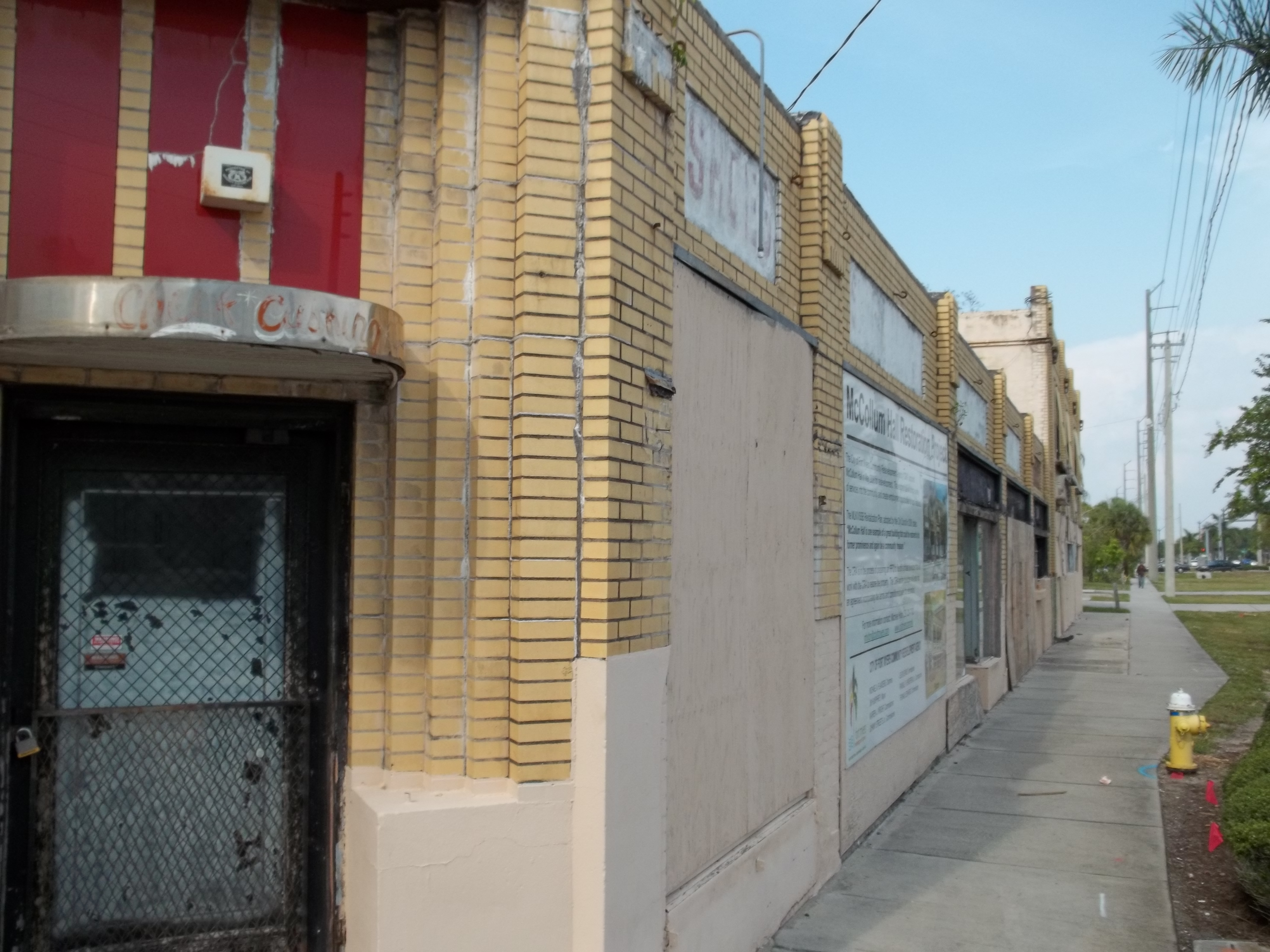
Building in 2011

It was built in 1938 by Clifford "Buck" McCollum Sr. and his wife Gertrude and became a center of entertainment and commerce. It hosted performers including Louis Armstrong, B. B. King, Ella Fitzgerald, Count Basie, and Duke Ellington between the 1930s and 1960s. In 2022, a developer was contracted to renovate the building and to add apartments adjacent.

It was used by the U.S.O. (United Service Organization) to host black servicemen from Page and Buckingham Army Air Fields. It was also a site for black professional baseball players visiting during spring training and hosted boxing matches.

== See also ==
- Chitlin' Circuit
- National Register of Historic Places listings in Lee County, Florida
