= Tween Waters Inn Historic District =

Historic district in Florida, United States

- U.S. National Register of Historic Places
- U.S. Historic district
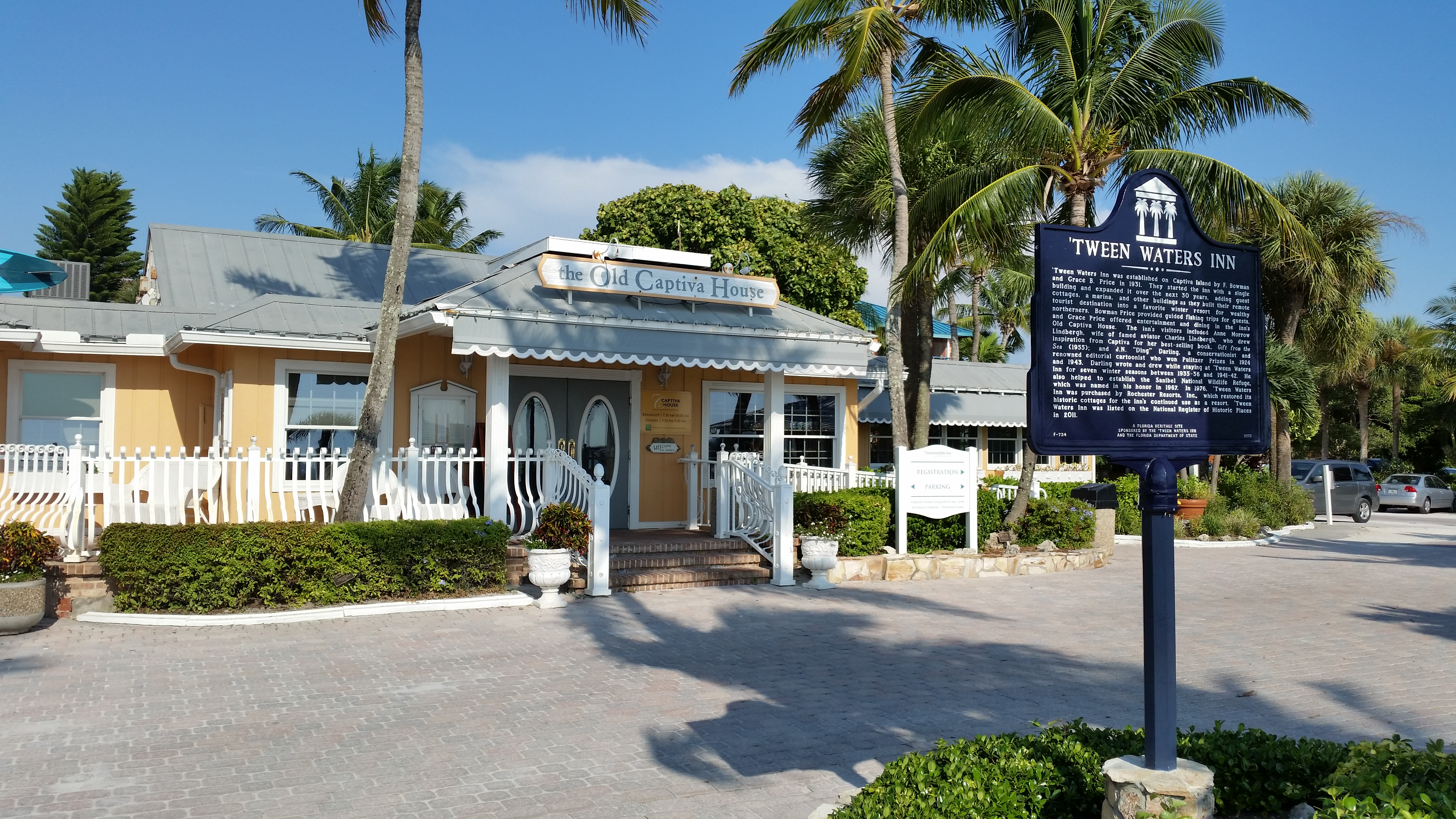
- Tween Waters Inn entrance

- Location within Florida Location within the United States
- Location: Captiva, Florida
- Coordinates: 26°30′36.97″N 82°11′25.03″W
- MPS: Lee County Multiple Property Submission
- NRHP reference No.: 11000904
- Added to NRHP: May 28, 2013

Tween Waters Inn Historic District is a national historic district located at Captiva, Florida in Lee County. It was established by F. Bowman and Grace B. Price in 1931 and expanded over the following 30 years.

It was added to the National Register of Historic Places in 2011.
