= San Carlos Bay =

Bay in Florida, United States

Coordinates: 26°28′14″N 81°59′39″W

San Carlos Bay is a bay located southwest of Fort Myers, Florida, at the mouth of the Caloosahatchee River. It connects to Pine Island Sound to the west and to Matlacha Pass to the north. The bay contains Bunche Beach Preserve, a 718-acre conservation area acquired by Lee County, Florida in 2001. This part of San Carlos Bay includes tidal wetlands area that includes beach, mangrove forests and salt water "flats" popular with wildlife enthusiasts, paddlers and fishermen.

The United States Navy seaplane tender USS San Carlos Bay, in commission from 1944 to 1947, was named for the bay.
