= William H. Towles House =

Historic house in Florida, United States

- U.S. National Register of Historic Places
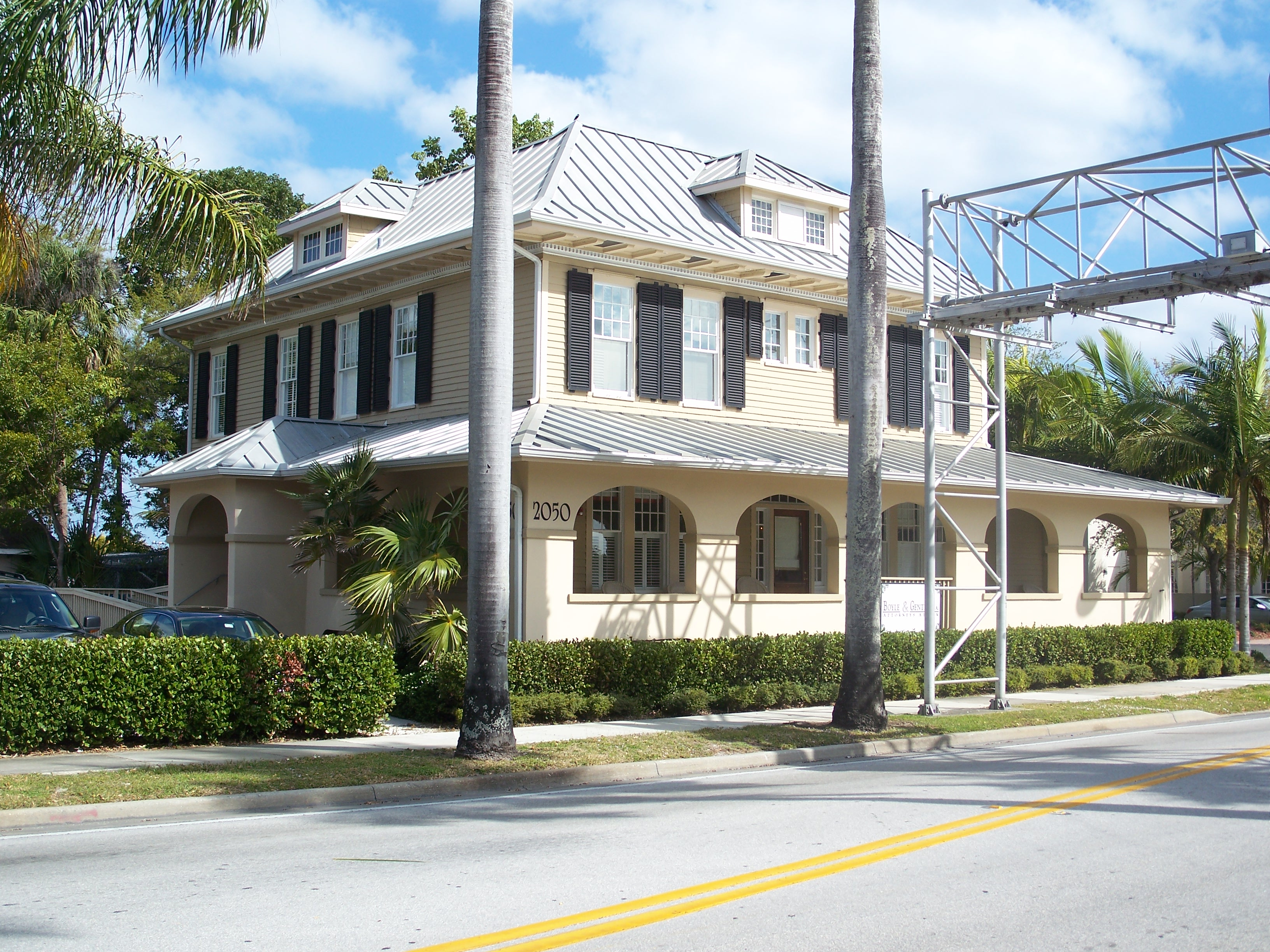

- Location within Florida Location within the United States
- Location: 2050 McGregor Blvd, Fort Myers, Florida
- Coordinates: 26°38′22″N 81°52′27.6″W
- Built: 1885
- Architectural style: Colonial Revival
- NRHP reference No.: 08000463
- Added to NRHP: May 29, 2008

The William H. Towles House is a historic house at 2050 McGregor Boulevard in Fort Myers, Florida, United States. On May 29, 2008, it was added to the US National Register of Historic Places.

== William H. Towles ==
One of the most colorful characters in Fort Myers history was William H. "Bill" Towles(September 28, 1852 – June 25, 1921). It was he who gave Fort Myers its present courthouse, standing guard with a shotgun to ward off opponents while workmen labored all night to tear down the old courthouse before a court order could be obtained to stop the move. Bill Towles was a cattle operator on a large scale who made a fortune shipping beef to Cuba.

Born in 1852 at Perry, Florida, he got into the cattle business while a young man, moved his cattle to Fort Myers ranges in 1884 and went into business with James E. Hendry Sr. Towles led the fight in establishing Lee County, Florida and for many years served as county commissioner, and it was as chairman of the board that he forced the building of the new courthouse. He also served for several years as a member of the town council.

Towles died in 1921.
