= Dean Park Historic Residential District =

Historic district in Florida, United States

- U.S. National Register of Historic Places
- U.S. Historic district
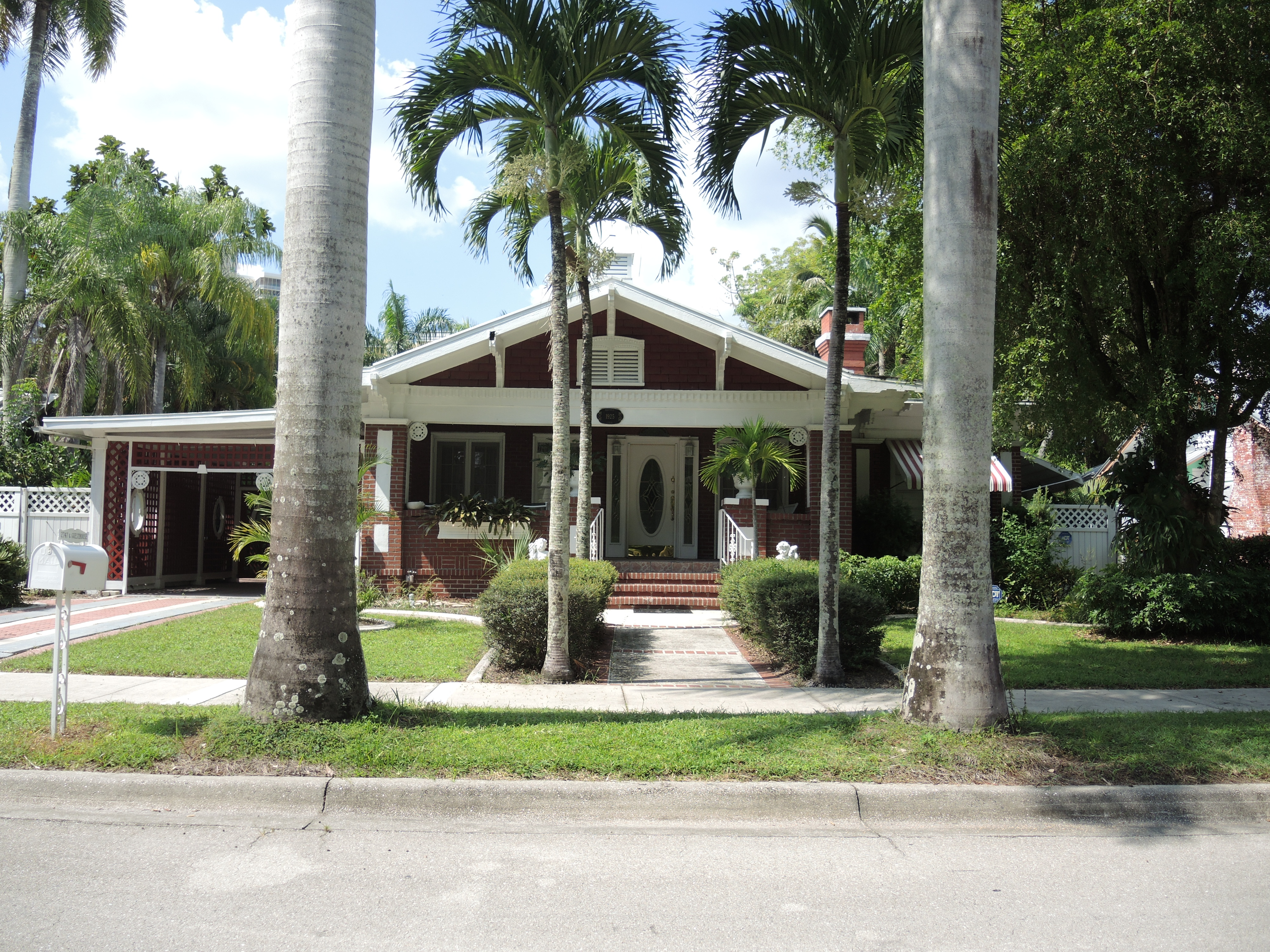
- Dean Park house

- Location within Florida Location within the United States
- Location: Fort Myers, Florida
- Coordinates: 26°38′56.93″N 81°51′30.4″W
- NRHP reference No.: 13000319
- Added to NRHP: May 28, 2013

Dean Park Historic Residential District is a national historic district located at Fort Myers, Florida in Lee County. Its context is very similar to the one in the early 1920s, when the district was built.

It was added to the National Register of Historic Places in 2013.
