= First Baptist Church of Boca Grande =

Historic church in Florida, United States

- U.S. National Register of Historic Places
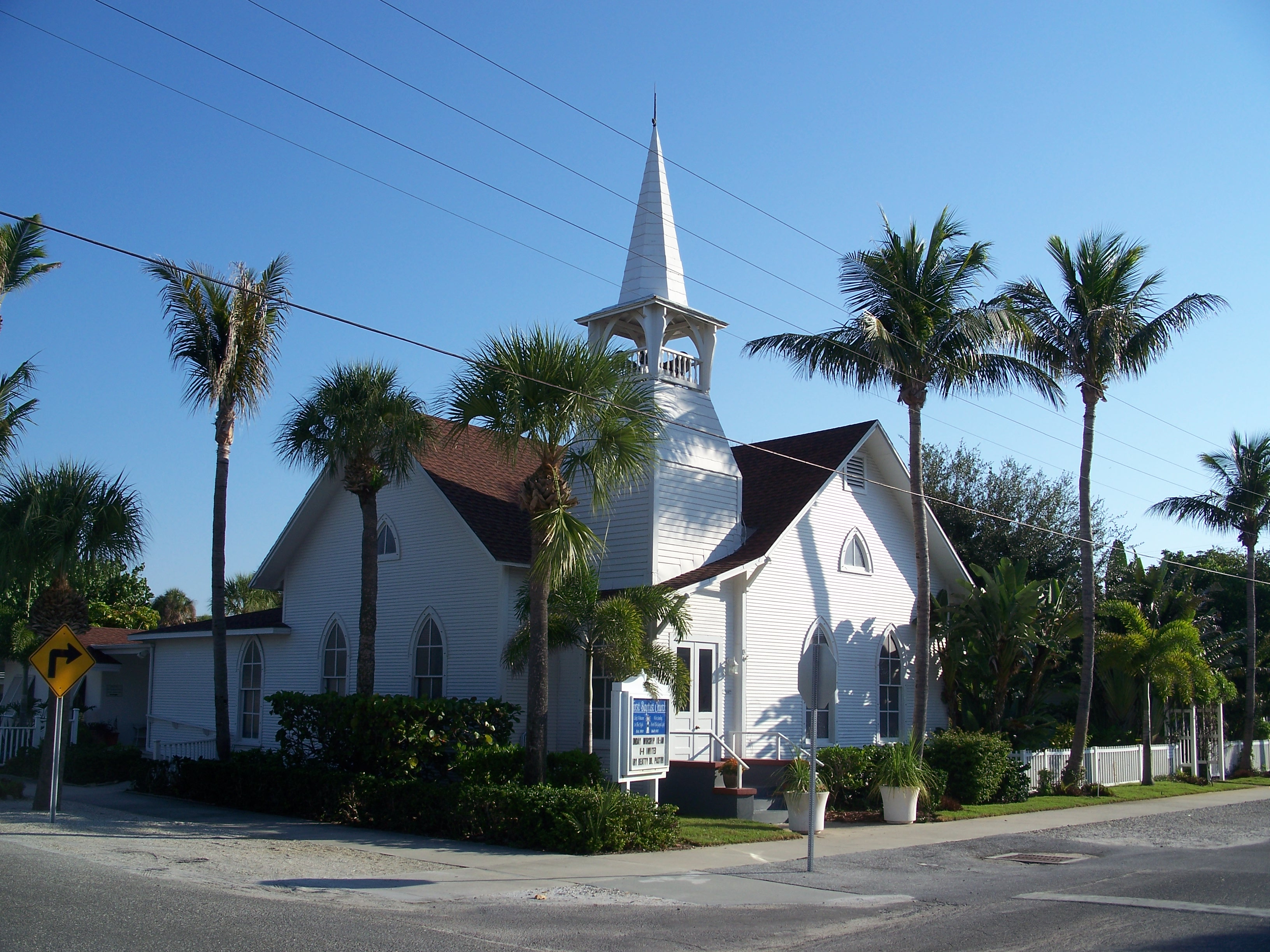
- First Baptist Church of Boca Grande

- Location within Florida Location within the United States
- Location: Boca Grande, Florida
- Coordinates: 26°45′03″N 82°15′46″W
- NRHP reference No.: 09000962
- Added to NRHP: December 2, 2009

First Baptist Church of Boca Grande is a historic Southern Baptist church located at 421 4th Street West, Boca Grande, Florida in Lee County. It was established in 1909 on Gasparilla Island.

It was added to the National Register of Historic Places in 2009.

At the beginning, the congregation met outdoors twice a month; services were conducted by circuit riding preachers. A building committee organized between 1911 and 1912. Construction was funded by a loan from Florida Southern Baptist ministries and donations from congregates. In 1915 the church styled by Carpenter Gothic architecture was completed. In 1918 expansion of the building added classrooms for Sunday school, and a rectory was built in 1934. First Baptist Church celebrated its 100th birthday in 2009.
