= Downtown Boca Grande Historic District =

Historic district in Florida, United States

- U.S. National Register of Historic Places
- U.S. Historic district
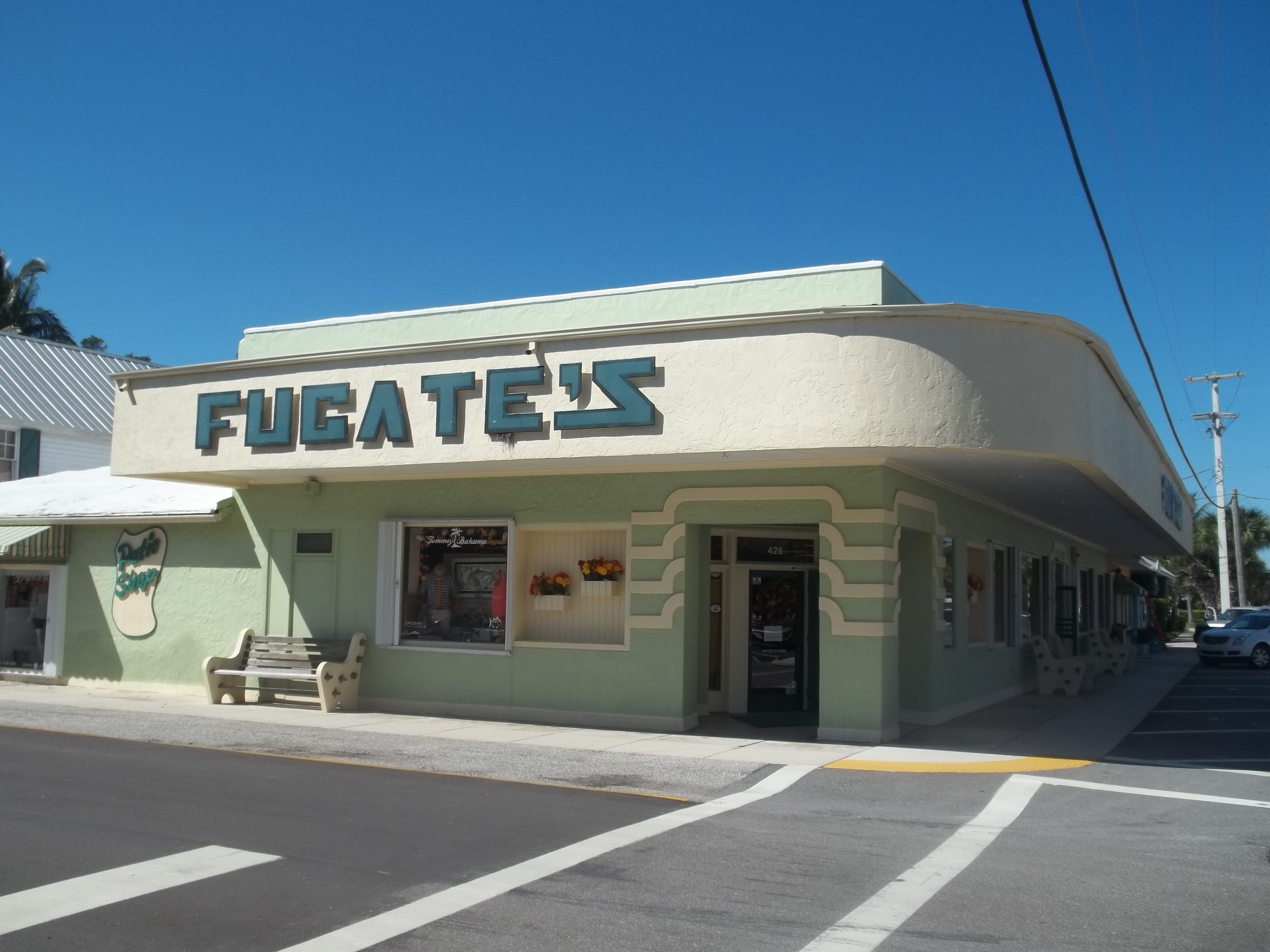
- Building in the district

- Location within Florida Location within the United States
- Location: Boca Grande, Florida
- Coordinates: 26°45′1″N 82°15′39″W
- NRHP reference No.: 11000577
- Added to NRHP: May 28, 2013

Downtown Boca Grande Historic District is a national historic district located at Boca Grande, Florida in Lee County. The district consists of residential and commercial buildings built between 1900 and 1953.

It was added to the National Register of Historic Places in 2011.
