= Menge-Hansen Marine Ways =

- U.S. National Register of Historic Places
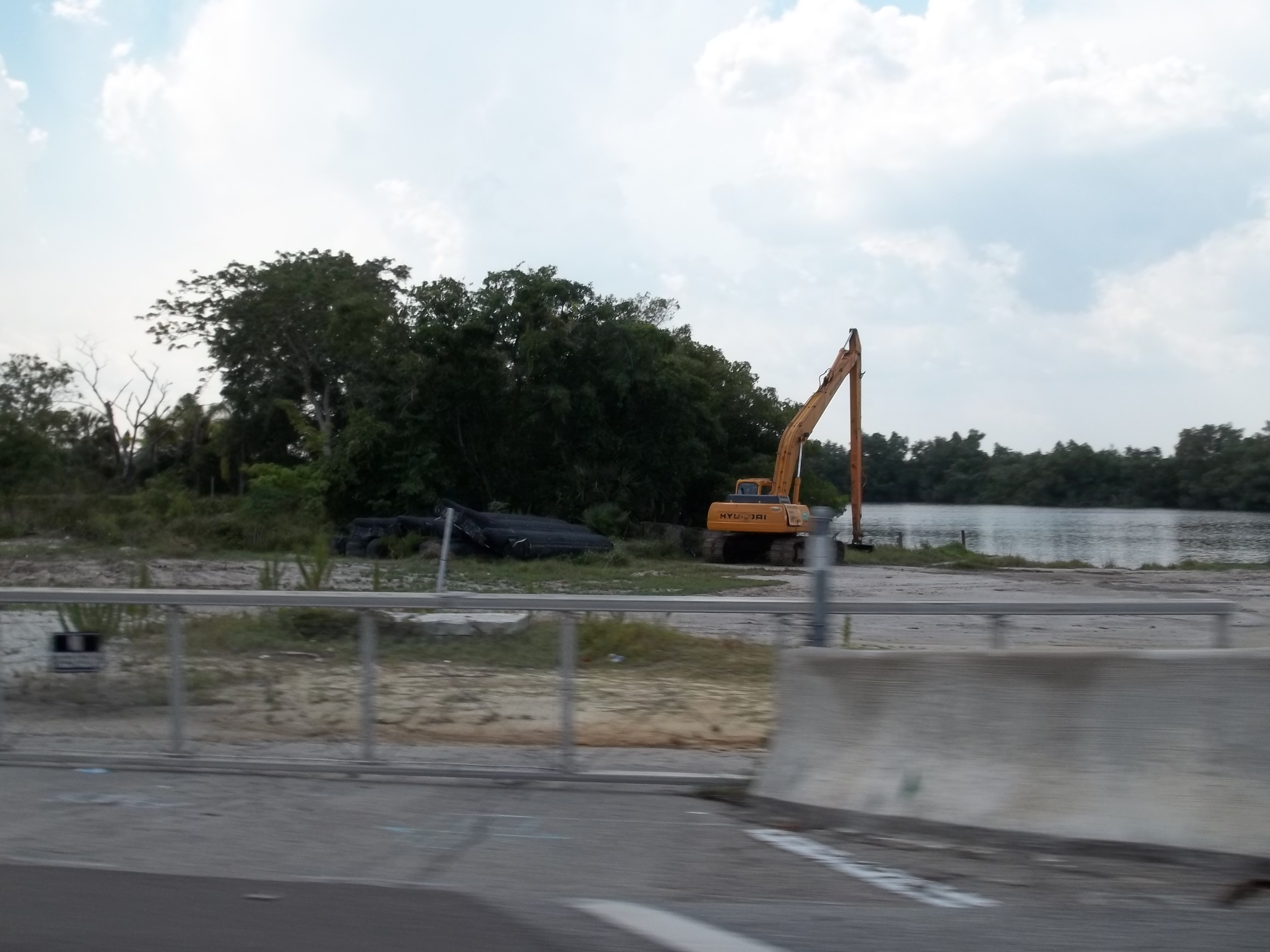
- Menge-Hansen Marine Ways

- Location within Florida Location within the United States
- Location: Fort Myers, Florida
- Coordinates: 26°41′16″N 81°47′35″W
- NRHP reference No.: 09000670
- Added to NRHP: September 2, 2009

Menge-Hansen Marine Ways is a national historic site located at 5605 Palm Beach Boulevard, Fort Myers, Florida in Lee County. It is a shipyard on the Orange River built in the 1880s.

It was added to the National Register of Historic Places in 2009.
