= Tice Grammar School =

- U.S. National Register of Historic Places
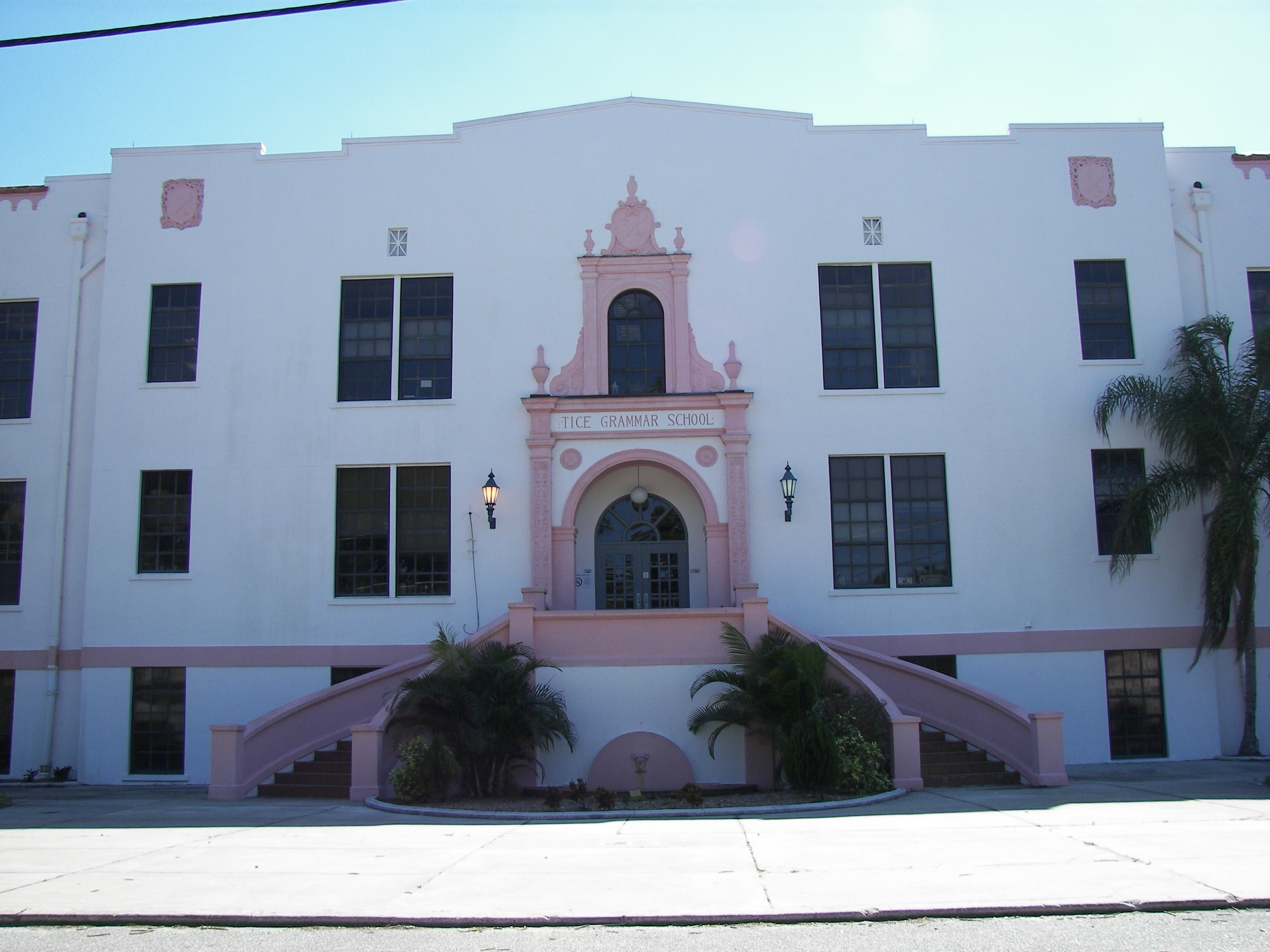
- Location: Tice, Florida
- Coordinates: 26°40′13″N 81°49′14″W
- Architectural style: Mission/Spanish Revival
- NRHP reference No.: 99000799
- Added to NRHP: July 8, 1999

The Tice Grammar School (also known as the Tice Elementary School) is a historical school in Tice, Florida, United States. It is located at 4524 Tice Street. On July 8, 1999, it was added to the U.S. National Register of Historic Places.
