= Pineland, Florida =

- Census-designated place
- Location in Lee County and the state of Florida
- Coordinates: 26°39′51″N 82°08′51″W
- Country: United States
- State: Florida
- County: Lee

Area
  - Total: 0.92 sq mi (2.39 km^{2})
  - Land: 0.90 sq mi (2.32 km^{2})
  - Water: 0.027 sq mi (0.07 km^{2})
- Elevation: 7 ft (2.1 m)

Population (2020)
  - Total: 466
  - Density: 519.5/sq mi (200.59/km^{2})
- Time zone: UTC-5 (Eastern (EST))
  - Summer (DST): UTC-4 (EDT)
- ZIP code: 33945
- Area code: 239
- FIPS code: 12-56875
- GNIS feature ID: 2403419

Pineland is an unincorporated community and census-designated place (CDP) on Pine Island in Lee County, Florida, United States. The population was 466 at the 2020 census, up from 407 at the 2010 census. It is part of the Cape Coral-Fort Myers, Florida Metropolitan Statistical Area.

== Geography ==
Pineland is located in western Lee County on the west side of Pine Island near its northern end. It is bordered to the north and east by Bokeelia, to the south by Pine Island Center, and to the west by Pine Island Sound, an arm of the Gulf of Mexico. The northeast border of the CDP is Stringfellow Road (County Road 767), which runs north–south the length of the island.

According to the United States Census Bureau, the Pineland CDP has a total area of 0.93 square miles (2.4 km^{2}), of which 0.03 square miles (0.07 km^{2}), or 2.90%, are water.

== History ==
Pineland was the location of one of the largest and oldest native Florida settlements, established at least 2,000 years ago and used by a slowly evolving sequence of cultures. The Calusa people inhabited the area for 1,500 years until the arrival of Europeans. They called the site "Tampa" or "Tanpa", a name which was accidentally transferred north by European explorers.

== Demographics ==
Historical population
Census	Pop.	Note	%±
2000	444		—
2010	407		−8.3%
2020	466		14.5%
U.S. Decennial Census

As of the census of 2000, there were 444 people, 212 households, and 150 families residing in the CDP. The population density was 481.7 inhabitants per square mile (186.0/km^{2}). There were 247 housing units at an average density of 268.0 per square mile (103.5/km^{2}). The racial makeup of the CDP was 98.65% White, 0.68% from other races, and 0.68% from two or more races. Hispanic or Latino of any race were 1.35% of the population.

There were 212 households, out of which 14.6% had children under the age of 18 living with them, 63.2% were married couples living together, 4.2% had a female householder with no husband present, and 29.2% were non-families. 22.2% of all households were made up of individuals, and 11.3% had someone living alone who was 65 years of age or older. The average household size was 2.09 and the average family size was 2.41.

In the CDP, the population was spread out, with 13.1% under the age of 18, 3.2% from 18 to 24, 14.6% from 25 to 44, 32.2% from 45 to 64, and 36.9% who were 65 years of age or older. The median age was 58 years. For every 100 females, there were 93.0 males. For every 100 females age 18 and over, there were 90.1 males.

The median income for a household in the CDP was $56,875, and the median income for a family was $59,615. Males had a median income of $61,058 versus $40,972 for females. The per capita income for the CDP was $28,556. None of the families and 3.0% of the population were living below the poverty line, including no under eighteens and none of those over 64.

== Points of interest ==
- The Florida Museum of Natural History's Randell Research Center is an archeological center and trail system devoted to the study of the original Calusa settlement at Pineland. Calusa shell mounds and remnants of their canal system are visible from the trail.
- Pineland is home to one of the smallest post offices in the United States.
