= Jewett-Thompson House =

Historic house in Florida, United States

- U.S. National Register of Historic Places
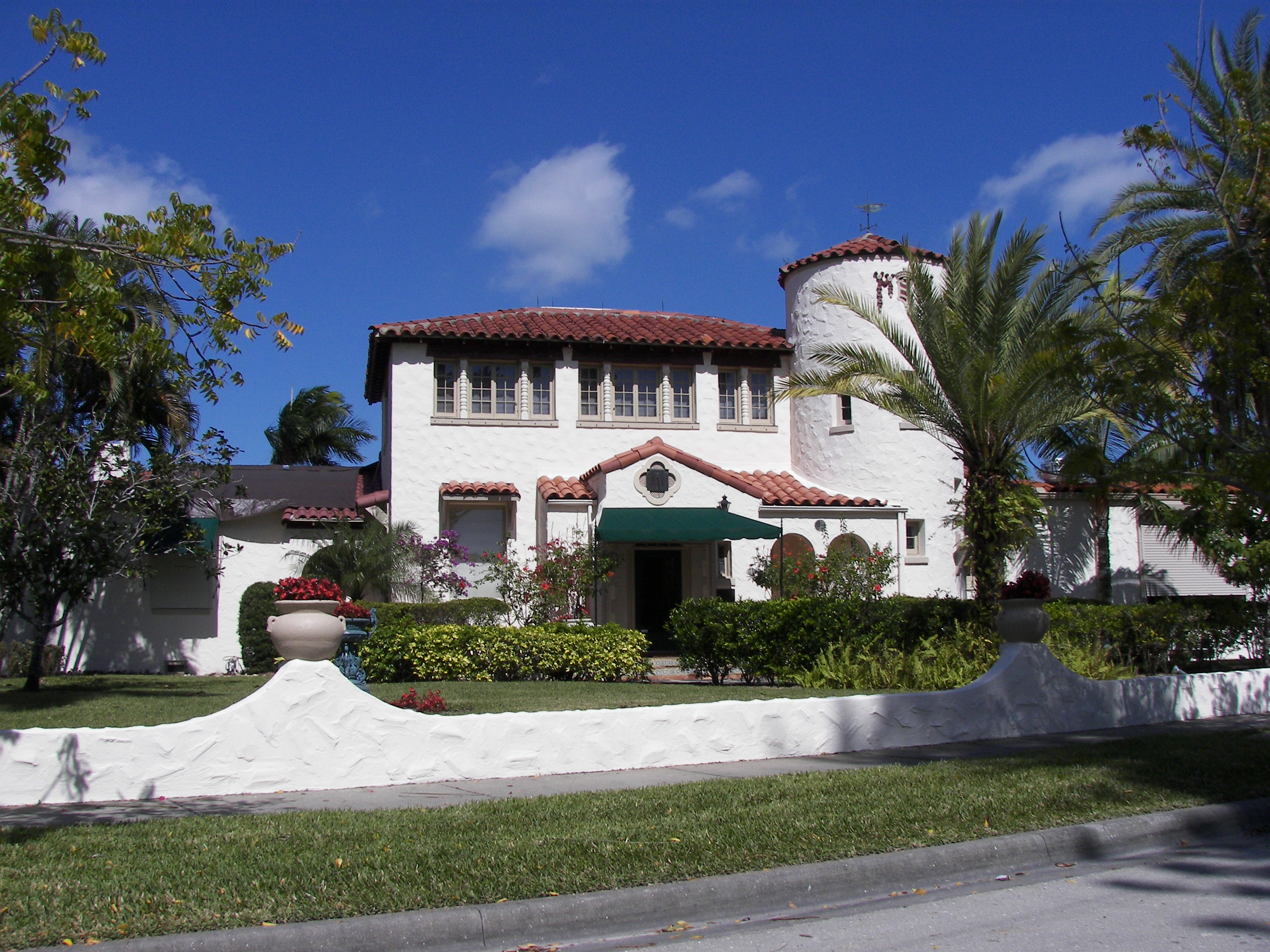

- Location within Florida Location within the United States
- Location: Fort Myers, Florida United States
- Coordinates: 26°36′34.5″N 81°53′27″W
- Built: 1926
- Architectural style: Mission/Spanish Revival
- NRHP reference No.: 88001708
- Added to NRHP: September 29, 1988

The Jewett-Thompson House is a historic house located at 1141 Wales Drive in Fort Myers, Florida.

== Description and history ==
On September 29, 1988, it was added to the National Register of Historic Places.
