= Matlacha Pass National Wildlife Refuge =

United States National Wildlife Refuge in Florida

- IUCN category V (protected landscape/seascape)
- Location within Florida Location within the United States
- Location: Lee County, Florida, United States
- Nearest city: Cape Coral, Florida
- Coordinates: 26°33′33″N 82°04′17″W
- Area: 538 acres (218 ha)
- Established: September 26, 1908
- Governing body: U.S. Fish and Wildlife Service
- Website: Matlacha Pass National Wildlife Refuge

The Matlacha Pass National Wildlife Refuge is part of the United States National Wildlife Refuge System, located within the Matlacha Pass estuary, approximately 8 miles northwest of Fort Myers, Florida. The 538 acre (2.2 km^{2}) refuge was established on September 26, 1908. The islands were established as a "preserve and breeding ground for native birds" by President Theodore Roosevelt. It is administered as part of the J. N. "Ding" Darling National Wildlife Refuge Complex.

== History ==
Since being established, the refuge has grown to 23 islands encompassing about 512 acres. The most recent addition of lands to the refuge was on April 10, 1991. Fisherman Key, one of the largest islands of the refuge, once had fish camps and permanent residents on it.

== Flora and Fauna ==
Trees that can be seen here including red mangrove (Rhizophora mangle), black mangrove (Avicennia germinans), white mangrove (Laguncularia racemosa), buttonwood (Conocarpus erectus) and cabbage palm (Sabal palmetto). Also found in the area are tropical species such as seagrape (Coccoloba uvifera), Florida strangler fig (Ficus aurea) and gumbo limbo (Bursera simaruba).

Some of the threatened or endangered animal species which make the refuge home are the West Indian manatee, crocodile, eastern indigo snake, wood stork and bald eagle.
