= Tice, Florida =

- Census-designated place
- Location in Lee County and the state of Florida
- Coordinates: 26°40′32″N 81°49′00″W
- Country: United States
- State: Florida
- County: Lee

Area
  - Total: 1.35 sq mi (3.50 km^{2})
  - Land: 1.19 sq mi (3.09 km^{2})
  - Water: 0.16 sq mi (0.41 km^{2})
- Elevation: 13 ft (4.0 m)

Population (2020)
  - Total: 4,853
  - Density: 4,065.9/sq mi (1,569.85/km^{2})
- Time zone: UTC-5 (Eastern (EST))
  - Summer (DST): UTC-4 (EDT)
- ZIP code: 33905
- Area code: 239
- FIPS code: 12-71800
- GNIS feature ID: 2402930

Tice is an unincorporated community and census-designated place (CDP) in Lee County, Florida, United States. As of the 2020 census, the CDP population was 4,853. It is part of the Cape Coral-Fort Myers, Florida Metropolitan Statistical Area.

== Geography ==
Tice is in north-central Lee County. It is bordered to the south and west by the city of Fort Myers, the county seat. Its northern edge is the Caloosahatchee River.

Florida State Road 80 (Palm Beach Boulevard) is the main road through the community, leading northeast 1 mile (1.6 km) to Interstate 75 and southwest 4 miles (6 km) to the center of Fort Myers. Going farther east, SR 80 leads 25 miles (40 km) to LaBelle and 57 miles (92 km) to Clewiston near Lake Okeechobee.

According to the United States Census Bureau, the Tice CDP has a total area of 1.2 square miles (3.2 km^{2}), of which 1.1 square miles (2.8 km^{2}) are land and 0.2 square miles (0.4 km^{2}), or 12.31%, are water.

== Demographics ==
Historical population
Census	Pop.	Note	%±
1950	1,133		—
1960	4,377		286.3%
1970	7,254		65.7%
1980	6,645		−8.4%
1990	3,971		−40.2%
2000	4,538		14.3%
2010	4,470		−1.5%
2020	4,853		8.6%

=== 2020 census ===
As of the 2020 census, Tice had a population of 4,853. The median age was 31.2 years. 31.3% of residents were under the age of 18 and 9.9% of residents were 65 years of age or older. For every 100 females there were 122.1 males, and for every 100 females age 18 and over there were 127.7 males age 18 and over.

100.0% of residents lived in urban areas, while 0.0% lived in rural areas.

There were 1,428 households in Tice, of which 40.9% had children under the age of 18 living in them. Of all households, 37.7% were married-couple households, 28.3% were households with a male householder and no spouse or partner present, and 25.0% were households with a female householder and no spouse or partner present. About 22.2% of all households were made up of individuals and 8.3% had someone living alone who was 65 years of age or older.

There were 1,605 housing units, of which 11.0% were vacant. The homeowner vacancy rate was 1.9% and the rental vacancy rate was 6.4%.

Racial composition as of the 2020 census
Race	Number	Percent
White	1,536	31.7%
Black or African American	214	4.4%
American Indian and Alaska Native	301	6.2%
Asian	15	0.3%
Native Hawaiian and Other Pacific Islander	0	0.0%
Some other race	1,766	36.4%
Two or more races	1,021	21.0%
Hispanic or Latino (of any race)	3,564	73.4%

=== 2000 census ===
As of the census of 2000, there were 4,538 people, 1,556 households, and 1,026 families residing in the CDP. The population density was 3,979.3 inhabitants per square mile (1,536.4/km^{2}). There were 1,789 housing units at an average density of 1,568.7 per square mile (605.7/km^{2}). The racial makeup of the CDP was 49.83% Hispanic, 37.07% African American, 11.25% Non-Hispanic White, 0.66% Native American, 1.06% Asian, 0.13% Pacific Islander, 2.08% from other races, and 4.36% from two or more races.

There were 1,556 households, out of which 33.4% had children under the age of 18 living with them, 41.0% were married couples living together, 16.6% had a female householder with no husband present, and 34.0% were non-families. 24.4% of all households were made up of individuals, and 9.1% had someone living alone who was 65 years of age or older. The average household size was 2.92 and the average family size was 3.40.

In the CDP, the population was spread out, with 29.5% under the age of 18, 10.8% from 18 to 24, 29.9% from 25 to 44, 18.7% from 45 to 64, and 11.1% who were 65 years of age or older. The median age was 31 years. For every 100 females, there were 111.4 males. For every 100 females aged 18 and over, there were 114.7 males.

The median income for a household in the CDP was $25,453, and the median income for a family was $26,885. Males had a median income of $21,900 versus $18,214 for females. The per capita income for the CDP was $12,206. About 28.2% of families and 33.1% of the population were below the poverty line, including 44.5% of those under age 18 and 26.9% of those age 65 or over.
