= Pine Island (Lee County, Florida) =

Island in the United States of America

- Pine Island Pine Island (Lee County, Florida) (the Caribbean)

Geography
- Location: Lee County, Florida
- Coordinates: 26°33′33″N 82°05′59″W
- Adjacent to: Gulf of Mexico

Administration
- United States
- State: Florida
- County: Lee

Pine Island is the largest island on the Gulf Coast of peninsular Florida in the United States. Located in Lee County, on the Gulf of Mexico coast of southwest Florida, it is also the 118th largest island in the United States. The Intracoastal Waterway passes through Pine Island Sound, to the west of the island. Matlacha Pass runs between Pine Island and the mainland. Pine Island lies west of Cape Coral. For many years, Pine Island was a major commercial fishing community and many of its full-time residents still fish commercially today.

== Geography ==
Unlike the sandy barrier islands of Sanibel to the south, Captiva to the southwest, and North Captiva to the west, Pine Island has no large beach and is made from the same coral rock as the mainland. Pine Island is surrounded by mangroves and includes three aquatic preserves. Residents and visitors are attracted to Pine Island's natural rural character, fishing, and boating. Pine Island is mostly zoned as agricultural land; some visitors travel more than a hundred miles to purchase tropical fruit such as lychee and mangos grown and sold on Pine Island.

== Communities ==
Pine Island is home to four unincorporated towns: Pine Island Center, St. James City, Bokeelia, and Pineland. Matlacha also is considered one of the communities, but is on its own small island. Pine Island has a small town atmosphere, with no traffic lights and mostly agricultural zoning. The Greater Matlacha and Pine Island community has its own fire control district with an elected 5-person commission, marinas, shops, and fine casual restaurants. According to the 2000 census, the population of Pine Island is about 9000, however, the population varies seasonally, Pine Island being a winter home for many of its residents. Utilities are provided by LCEC for electricity and Pine Island Water Association (a private member coop). Cable TV is provided by Comcast and/or any of the various satellite providers.

Pine Island Center is located at the intersection of Pine Island and Stringfellow Roads. Pine Island Road (County Road 78) is the only road that leads to the mainland. Pine Island Center is the location of the island's two large grocery stores, along with an elementary school, library, museum, swimming pool, and a large park. Sixteen-mile-long Stringfellow Road (County Road 767) is Pine Island's main road and connects St. James City on the south end of the island with Bokeelia and Pineland on the north side of the island. St. James City, Pine Island's most heavily populated area, offers a splendid view of Sanibel Island and the Sanibel Causeway.

Bokeelia extends to the far northern tip of Pine Island, ending at tiny Bokeelia Island, which is accessed by a small bridge. Bokeelia is at the mouth of Charlotte Harbor. On clear days one can see across the water to Cape Haze and Boca Grande Pass where the gulf meets the harbor. Pineland is also on the northern portion of Pine Island, west off Stringfellow Road, about halfway between Pine Island Center and Bokeelia. Pineland features a golf course and country club.

East of Pine Island Center, along a two-mile (3 km) stretch of Pine Island Road, is Little Pine Island. Little Pine Island is a 4,700-acre (19 km^{2}) development-free wildlife preserve and the former location of a sewer treatment plant. The island community of Matlacha (pronounced "mat-luh-SHAY") is east of Little Pine Island and west of the city of Cape Coral on the mainland. The Matlacha Pass Bridge, a small drawbridge nicknamed "The fishingest bridge in the world", almost always is occupied by fishermen. Matlacha also has a large park and pier, as well as several shops, bars, and restaurants.

== History ==
The Pineland Archeological District near the community of Pineland includes many shell mounds on a site of more than 100 acres (40 ha), the remains of a Calusa village that was located at the site for more than 1500 years. The Rendell Research Center in the district is dedicated to learning and teaching the archaeology, history, and ecology of Southwest Florida and the culture of the Calusa people.

== Ecology ==
Pine Island is also home to Matlacha Pass National Wildlife Refuge. Little Pine Island is a state-owned wildlife refuge, currently being restored to its natural state by the elimination of the development features that had been built on the island. Ospreys, herons, egrets, ibises, and roseate spoonbills often are seen on the island, as well as owls, hawks, bald eagles, and many songbirds.

The local form of the marsh rice rat has been recognized in some classifications as a separate subspecies, Oryzomys palustris planirostris.

== Hurricanes ==
Pine Island was significantly affected in 2004 when Hurricane Charley passed through the area. In 2022, Hurricane Ian devastated the island, also causing major damage to the bridge leading to the mainland. The storm caused vital damage to the island's power grid, and it required being rebuilt into March 2023, months after the hurricane hit.
