= Pine Island Sound =

Coastal body of water in Florida, US

Coordinates: 26°36′15″N 82°10′16″W

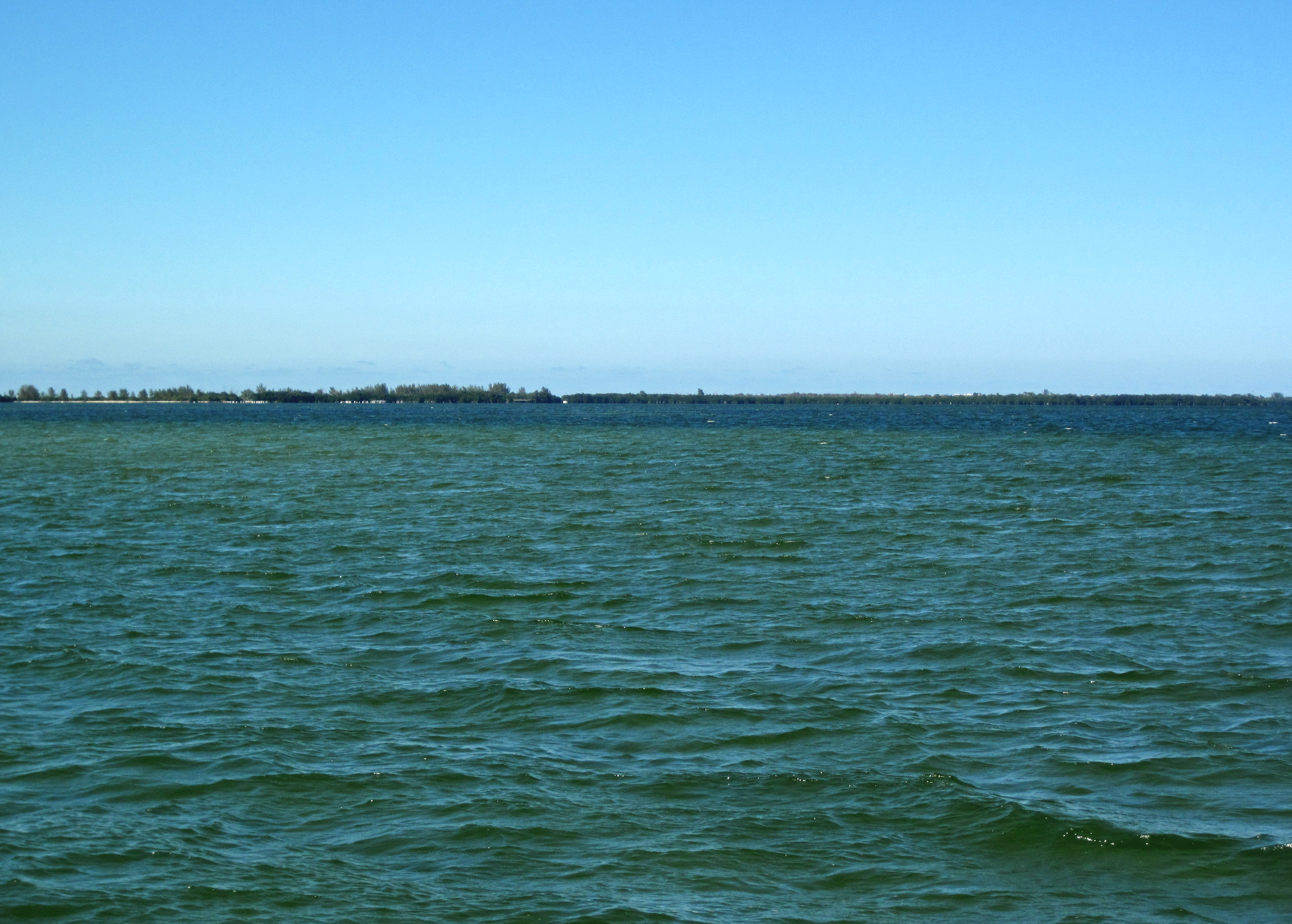
Pine Island Sound, January 2016

Pine Island Sound is located in Lee County, Florida, lying between Pine Island and the barrier islands of Sanibel Island, Captiva Island, North Captiva Island and Cayo Costa, which separate the Sound from the Gulf of Mexico. The Sound connects to Gasparilla Sound and Charlotte Harbor to the north, and to San Carlos Bay and the Caloosahatchee River to the south. The Sound is conterminous with the Pine Island Sound Aquatic Preserve, which was established in 1970 and consists of 54,000 acres (220 km^{2}) of submerged land. Important habitats in the Sound include mangroves, seagrasses, salt marshes, oyster communities, tidal flats and sponge beds. All animals in and around Pine Island sound, including mollusks, fish, birds and mammals, are affected by periodic outbreaks of red tide (Karenia brevis). The Sound is relatively shallow in many locations, and boaters are cautioned to utilize up-to-date charts and tide tables.

For thousands of years, the Sound was home to the Calusa Indians and their ancestors. The 67-acre Pineland Archeological District faces the Sound on the western shore of Pine Island. The Pineland site features several shell mounds, including a burial mound. The Mark Pardo Shellworks Site is on Cayo Costa Island, on the east side of the sound. Useppa Island, in the northern part of the sound, has a long history of occupation documented by archaeologists. In the 18th and 19th centuries Pine Island Sound was the site of seasonal camps (fishing ranchos) used by Cubans catching fish for the Havana market.

The Sound is also centerpiece of the Great Calusa Blueway paddling trail, a 190-mile canoe and kayak trail.
