= Lee County, Florida =

County in Florida, United States

- County
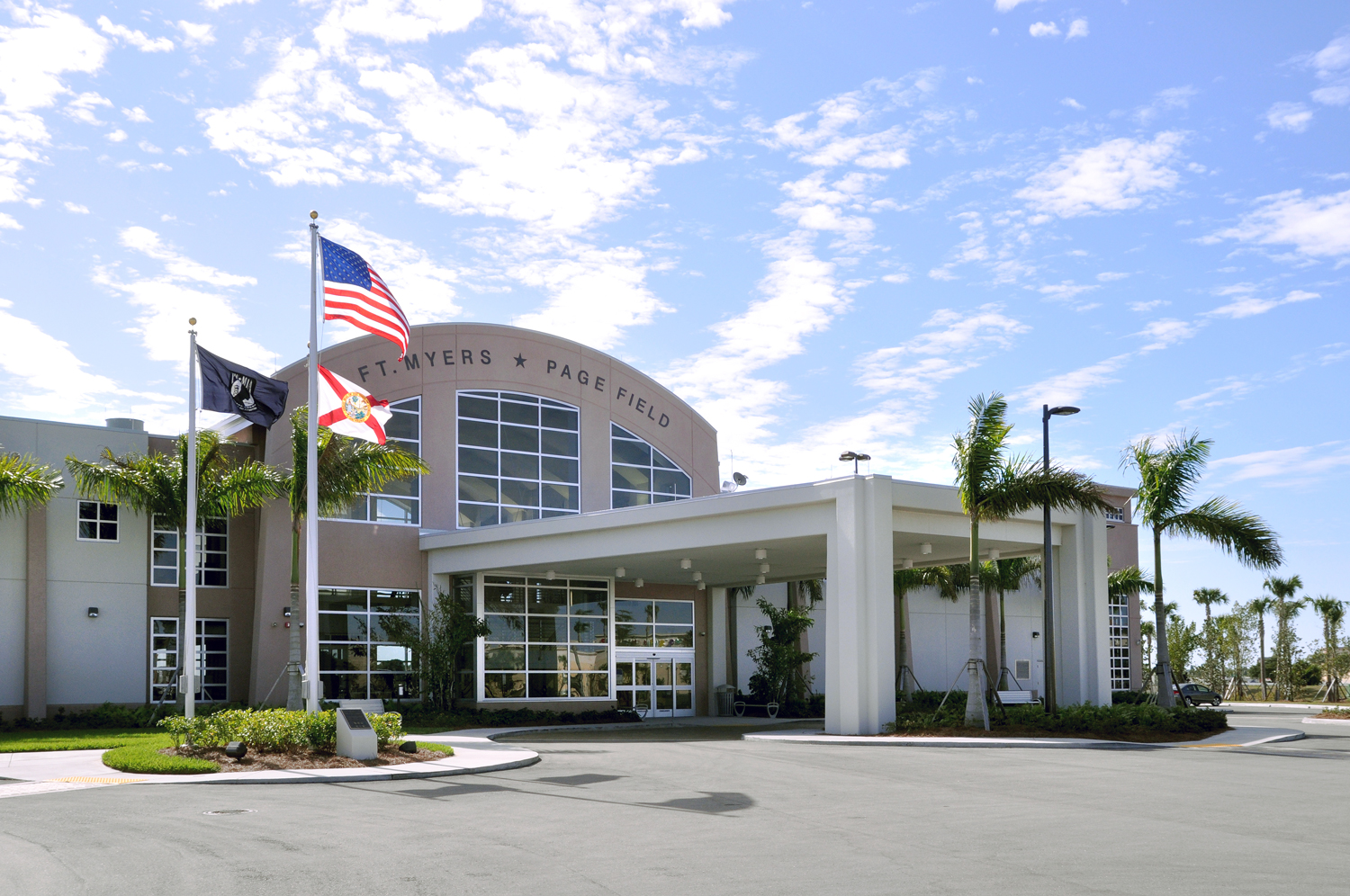
- Base Operations at Page Field

- Logo

- Location within the U.S. state of Florida
- Coordinates: 26.58°N 81.92°W
- Country: United States
- State: Florida
- Founded: May 13, 1887
- Named for: Robert E. Lee
- Seat: Fort Myers
- Largest city: Cape Coral

Area
  - Total: 1,212 sq mi (3,140 km^{2})
  - Land: 785 sq mi (2,030 km^{2})
  - Water: 428 sq mi (1,110 km^{2}) 35.3%

Population (2020)
  - Total: 760,822
  - Estimate (2025): 875,607 ▲
  - Density: 969/sq mi (374/km^{2})
- Time zone: UTC−5 (Eastern)
  - Summer (DST): UTC−4 (EDT)
- Congressional districts: 17th, 19th
- Website: www.leegov.com

Lee County is a county in the U.S. state of Florida. It is located on the Gulf Coast of Southwest Florida. As of the 2020 census, its population was 760,822. In 2022, the population was 822,453, making it the eighth-most populous county in the state. The county seat is Fort Myers, with a population of 86,395 as of the 2020 census, and the largest city is Cape Coral, with an estimated 2020 population of 194,016.

The county comprises the Cape Coral–Fort Myers Metropolitan Statistical Area (MSA), which, along with the Naples–Marco Island (Collier County) MSA and the Clewiston (Hendry County, Glades County) Micropolitan Statistical Area (μSA), is included in the Cape Coral–Fort Myers–Naples Combined Statistical Area (CSA).

Lee County was established in 1887 from Monroe County. Fort Myers is the county seat and a center of tourism in Southwest Florida. It is about 120 miles (190 km) south of Tampa at the meeting point of the Gulf of Mexico and the Caloosahatchee River. Lee County is the home for spring training of the Boston Red Sox and the Minnesota Twins Major League Baseball teams.

== History ==
=== Protohistory and European contact (500–1799) ===
The area that is now Lee County has several archaeological sites that provide evidence of habitation by peoples of the Caloosahatchee culture (500 to 1750 AD). By the time of European contact, the area was more specifically occupied by the Calusa. After European contact, fishermen from Cuba and other Spanish colonies set up fishing camps, known as ranchos in Spanish, on the southern portion of the Gulf Coast of Florida. These ranchos extended from Charlotte Harbor south to San Carlos Bay and the mouth of the Caloosahatchee. Likely established in the latter part of the 1600s, they were precursors to the larger European settlements that would follow in the centuries that followed. As the 18th century came to an end, the Calusa who had once inhabited the area were replaced with the Seminole (see also the Spanish Indians). In particular, in 1799, an Indian agent noted the existence of a Seminole town on the "Cull-oo-saw-hat-che" or Caloosahatchee River.

=== Fort established (1850s–1860s) ===
After Florida became a U.S. territory in 1821, a number of American settlers moved into the Florida Territory, leading to conflict with local Native tribes. Several military and trading posts were established near the Caloosahatchee River during the Second Seminole War. Fort Myers was built in 1850 as a military fort to fend off Seminole Indians just prior to the Third Seminole War (Billy Bowleg's War). The fort was named after Col. Abraham C. Myers, who was stationed in Florida for seven years and was the son-in-law of the fort's establisher and commander. In 1858, after years of elusive battle, Holata Micco (Chief Billy Bowlegs) and his warriors were persuaded to surrender and move west, and the fort was abandoned. Billy's Creek, which flows into the Caloosahatchee River, was named after a temporary camp where Billy Bowlegs and his men awaited ships to take them west. In 1863, the fort was reoccupied by federal troops during the Civil War. In 1865, in the Battle of Fort Myers, the fort was attacked by a small group of Confederates from the Cow Cavalry. The Union's garrison, led by Captain James Doyle, successfully held the fort, and the Confederate forces retreated. After the war, the fort was again deserted. The fort was later disassembled and some of its wood was used to build parts of downtown Fort Myers.

=== Settlement and early growth (1860s–1920s) ===
During the Civil War, Fort Myers was occupied by federal troops with the intention of disrupting the Confederate cattle supply from Florida. In February 1865, it was the site of the Battle of Fort Myers. The first settlers in Fort Myers arrived in 1866. In the 1870s, Tervio Padilla, a wealthy merchant from the Canary Islands, came by way of Key West to Cayo Costa and established trade with natives and "ranchos" that extended northward to Charlotte Harbor. His ships often made port at Cayo Costa at the entrance to the harbor. Enchanted by the tropical island, he eventually decided to settle there. Padilla prospered until the outbreak of the Spanish–American War, when his fleet was burned and scuttled. When the government claimed his land, he moved with his wife further down the island. The Padilla family is one of the first pioneer families of Lee County, and many still reside within the county, mainly around the Pine Island area.

In 1882, the city experienced a significant influx of settlers. In 1885, when Fort Myers was incorporated, its population of 349 residents made it the second-largest city after Tampa on Florida's west coast south of Cedar Key. Lee County was formed in 1887 from Monroe County, with Fort Myers serving as the county seat. It was named for Robert E. Lee, Confederate general in the American Civil War. Fort Myers first became a nationally known winter resort with the opening of the Royal Palm Hotel in 1898, built by New York City department store magnate Hugh O'Neill. Fort Myers was the frequent winter home for Thomas Edison and Henry Ford. In 1911, Fort Myers was incorporated as a city. In 1923, Collier and Hendry These counties were created by splitting these areas from Lee County. Construction of the Tamiami Trail Bridge, built across the Caloosahatchee River in 1924, sparked the city's growth. After the bridge's construction, the city experienced its first real estate boom, and many subdivisions sprouted around the city. In 1927, a property purchased by the City of Fort Myers was turned into an airport, eventually called Page Field.

=== Modern growth (1940s–present) ===
During World War II, Page Field served as an advanced fighter-training base and as home to several bomber groups. Following the war, a small terminal was built in the mid-1950s as the airport transitioned to commercial use. Another airfield was constructed in 1942 called Buckingham Army Airfield. The base was closed down in 1945, after which the barracks served as classrooms for Edison College until 1948. Following the end of World War II, the Royal Palm Hotel was closed permanently, and in 1947, the hotel on the corner of First and Fowler was torn down.

Lee County has hosted several Major League Baseball teams for spring training over the past several decades. The county received a significant economic boost in 1983 when Southwest Florida Regional Airport (now known as Southwest Florida International Airport) opened. To accommodate the region's post-pandemic population boom, the airport launched a major $1.1 billion terminal expansion in the mid-2020s. This project, which includes the construction of a new Concourse E and a consolidated security checkpoint, officially broke ground on its second phase in late 2024.

Between 2020 and 2024 alone, Lee County's population grew by approximately 13.2% to over 860,000 residents, driven largely by domestic migration.

==== Infrastructure and redevelopment ====
In the wake of recent storms, the county undertook massive infrastructure hardening projects. In 2023, construction began to replace the Big Carlos Pass Bridge, converting the aging drawbridge into a 60-foot fixed-span structure; the project was scheduled for completion in the summer of 2026. Additionally, the Sanibel Causeway, which was severed during Hurricane Ian, underwent permanent resilient repairs that included sheet pile walls and elevated roadways, fully reopening to the public in May 2025.

==== Hurricanes ====
On August 13, 2004, the county was struck by Hurricane Charley, a category 4 storm, particularly impacting the northwestern islands of Captiva and Gasparilla. On September 10, 2017, Hurricane Irma struck as a category 2 storm, causing widespread flooding in Lehigh Acres and Bonita Springs.

On September 28, 2022, Hurricane Ian made landfall as a category 4 storm, becoming the deadliest hurricane in Lee County history with over 70 confirmed deaths. The storm obliterated the Fort Myers Beach pier and historic cottage districts.

In late 2024, the county was affected by two consecutive storms. Hurricane Helene (September 2024) pushed significant storm surge into coastal properties, filling pools with sand. Less than two weeks later, Hurricane Milton (October 2024) brought tropical storm-force winds and tornadoes to the county, with the newly reinforced Sanibel Causeway remaining passable for emergency vehicles.

== Geography ==
According to the U.S. Census Bureau, the county has a total area of 1,212 square miles (3,140 km^{2}), of which 428 square miles (1,110 km^{2}) (35.3%) are covered by water. Rivers and streams include the Caloosahatchee River, the Imperial River, the Estero River, Hendry Creek, and Orange River. Lee County is on the southwest coast of Florida. It is about 125 miles (201 km) south of Tampa, 115 miles (185 km) west of Fort Lauderdale via Interstate 75, and roughly 125 miles (201 km) west-northwest of Miami via U.S. Highway 41.

=== Adjacent counties ===
- Charlotte County (north)
- Glades County (northeast)
- Collier County (southeast)
- Hendry County (east)

=== National protected areas ===
- Caloosahatchee National Wildlife Refuge
- J.N. "Ding" Darling National Wildlife Refuge
- Matlacha Pass National Wildlife Refuge
- Pine Island National Wildlife Refuge

=== Islands ===
- Big Hickory Island
- Captiva Island
- Cayo Costa (Cayo Costa State Park)
- Cabbage Key
- Estero Island (Town of Fort Myers Beach)
- Gasparilla Island (community of Boca Grande)
- Little Hickory Island (Beaches of Bonita Springs)
- Lovers Key / Carl E. Johnson State Park
- Matlacha Island Matlacha, Florida
- Mound Key Archaeological State Park
- North Captiva Island
- Pine Island
- San Carlos Island (Town of Fort Myers Beach)
- Sanibel Island (Town of Sanibel)
- Useppa Island

=== Climate ===
Lee County has a year-round warm, monsoon-influenced climate that is close to the boundary between tropical and subtropical climates (18 °C (64 °F) in the coldest month), thus is either classified as a humid subtropical climate (Köppen Cfa), which is the classification used by National Oceanic and Atmospheric Administration, (Note: The NOAA document used classifies locations as warm as Newport News, Virginia, as "continental", but areas with drastically more extreme climates, such as Wichita, Kansas, as "subtropical".) or a tropical savanna climate (Köppen Aw). Lee County has short, warm winters, and long, hot, humid summers, with most of the year's rainfall occurring from June to September. The temperature rarely rises to 100 °F (38 °C) or lowers to the freezing mark. At 89, Lee County leads the nation in the number of days annually in which a thunderstorm is close enough for thunder to be heard. The monthly daily average temperature ranges from 64.2 °F (17.9 °C) in January to 83.4 °F (28.6 °C) in August, with the annual mean being 75.1 °F (23.9 °C). Records range from 24 °F (−4 °C) on December 29, 1894 up to 103 °F (39 °C) on June 16–17, 1981.

Climate data for Fort Myers, Florida (Page Field), 1981–2010 normals
Month	Jan	Feb	Mar	Apr	May	Jun	Jul	Aug	Sep	Oct	Nov	Dec	Year
Record high °F (°C)	90 (32)	92 (33)	93 (34)	96 (36)	99 (37)	103 (39)	101 (38)	100 (38)	98 (37)	95 (35)	95 (35)	90 (32)	103 (39)
Mean daily maximum °F (°C)	74.7 (23.7)	77.2 (25.1)	80.4 (26.9)	84.6 (29.2)	89.4 (31.9)	91.5 (33.1)	91.9 (33.3)	91.8 (33.2)	90.5 (32.5)	86.7 (30.4)	81.3 (27.4)	76.6 (24.8)	84.7 (29.3)
Mean daily minimum °F (°C)	53.7 (12.1)	55.9 (13.3)	59.4 (15.2)	63.1 (17.3)	68.7 (20.4)	73.5 (23.1)	74.5 (23.6)	74.9 (23.8)	74.3 (23.5)	69.1 (20.6)	62.0 (16.7)	56.4 (13.6)	65.5 (18.6)
Record low °F (°C)	27 (−3)	27 (−3)	33 (1)	39 (4)	50 (10)	58 (14)	66 (19)	65 (18)	63 (17)	45 (7)	34 (1)	24 (−4)	24 (−4)
Average rainfall inches (mm)	1.89 (48)	2.13 (54)	2.84 (72)	2.02 (51)	2.72 (69)	10.28 (261)	9.14 (232)	10.21 (259)	8.55 (217)	2.67 (68)	1.92 (49)	1.69 (43)	56.06 (1,424)
Average rainy days (≥ 0.01 in)	5.5	5.2	6.2	4.2	6.8	16.0	17.6	17.9	15.4	6.8	4.4	4.5	110.5
Source: NOAA (extremes 1892–present)

== Demographics ==
Historical population
Census	Pop.	Note	%±
1890	1,414		—
1900	3,071		117.2%
1910	6,294		104.9%
1920	9,540		51.6%
1930	14,990		57.1%
1940	17,488		16.7%
1950	23,404		33.8%
1960	54,539		133.0%
1970	105,216		92.9%
1980	205,266		95.1%
1990	335,113		63.3%
2000	440,888		31.6%
2010	618,754		40.3%
2020	760,822		23.0%
2025 (est.)	875,607	▲	15.1%

=== 2020 census ===
As of the 2020 census, the county had a population of 760,822, 318,303 households, and 187,877 families residing in the county.

The median age was 49.7 years. About 4.6% of residents were under the age of 5, 17.4% were under 18, and 29.1% were 65 years of age or older; 51.0% of the population was female; for every 100 females there were 95.4 males, and for every 100 females age 18 and over there were 93.2 males age 18 and over.

The racial makeup of the county was 69.7% White, 7.7% Black or African American, 0.5% American Indian and Alaska Native, 1.7% Asian, <0.1% Native Hawaiian and Pacific Islander, 7.5% from some other race, and 12.8% from two or more races. Hispanic or Latino residents of any race comprised 22.8% of the population.

96.1% of residents lived in urban areas, while 3.9% lived in rural areas.

There were 318,303 households in the county, of which 22.4% had children under the age of 18 living in them. Of all households, 50.7% were married-couple households, 16.7% were households with a male householder and no spouse or partner present, and 25.1% were households with a female householder and no spouse or partner present. About 26.3% of all households were made up of individuals and 14.5% had someone living alone who was 65 years of age or older.

There were 416,332 housing units, of which 23.5% were vacant. Among occupied housing units, 71.9% were owner-occupied and 28.1% were renter-occupied. The homeowner vacancy rate was 2.5% and the rental vacancy rate was 12.8%.

=== Racial and ethnic composition ===
Lee County, Florida – Racial and ethnic composition Note: the US Census treats Hispanic/Latino as an ethnic category. This table excludes Latinos from the racial categories and assigns them to a separate category. Hispanics/Latinos may be of any race.
Race / ethnicity (NH = Non-Hispanic)	Pop 1980	Pop 1990	Pop 2000	Pop 2010	Pop 2020	% 1980	% 1990	% 2000	% 2010	% 2020
White alone (NH)	182,483	296,005	361,439	439,048	490,476	88.90%	88.33%	81.98%	70.96%	64.47%
Black or African American alone (NH)	16,084	21,515	28,020	47,751	55,958	7.84%	6.42%	6.36%	7.72%	7.35%
Native American or Alaska Native alone (NH)	223	603	944	1,292	1,228	0.11%	0.18%	0.21%	0.21%	0.16%
Asian alone (NH)	586	1,776	3,345	8,252	12,789	0.29%	0.53%	0.76%	1.33%	1.68%
Native Hawaiian or Pacific Islander alone (NH)	x	x	145	197	244	x	x	0.03%	0.03%	0.03%
Other race alone (NH)	172	120	554	1,581	3,974	0.08%	0.04%	0.13%	0.26%	0.52%
Mixed race or Multiracial (NH)	x	x	4,399	7,325	22,992	x	x	1.00%	1.18%	3.02%
Hispanic or Latino (any race)	5,718	15,094	42,042	113,308	173,161	2.79%	4.50%	9.54%	18.31%	22.76%
Total	205,266	335,113	440,888	618,754	760,822	100.00%	100.00%	100.00%	100.00%	100.00%

=== Languages ===
As of 2010, 78.99% of residents spoke English as their first language, and 15.19% spoke Spanish, 1.28% French Creole (mostly Haitian Creole,) 0.88% German, 0.59% Portuguese, and 0.55% spoke French as their main language. In total, 21.01% of the population spoke languages other than English as their primary language.

== Economy ==
Lee County's stronger economic sectors include construction, retail, leisure, and hospitality. Hertz moved its headquarters from New Jersey to Estero in 2016, the first major corporation to relocate to Lee County. The largest employers in Lee County as of 2019 are:

Rank	Employer	Employees
1	Lee Health	13,595
2	Lee County School District	12,936
3	Lee County government	9,038
4	Publix Supermarkets	4,624
5	Florida Gulf Coast University	3,430
6	Walmart	3,067
7	City of Cape Coral	2,253
8	Hope Hospice	1,630
9	McDonald's	1,482
10	Florida SouthWestern State College	1,441

== Law enforcement and crime ==
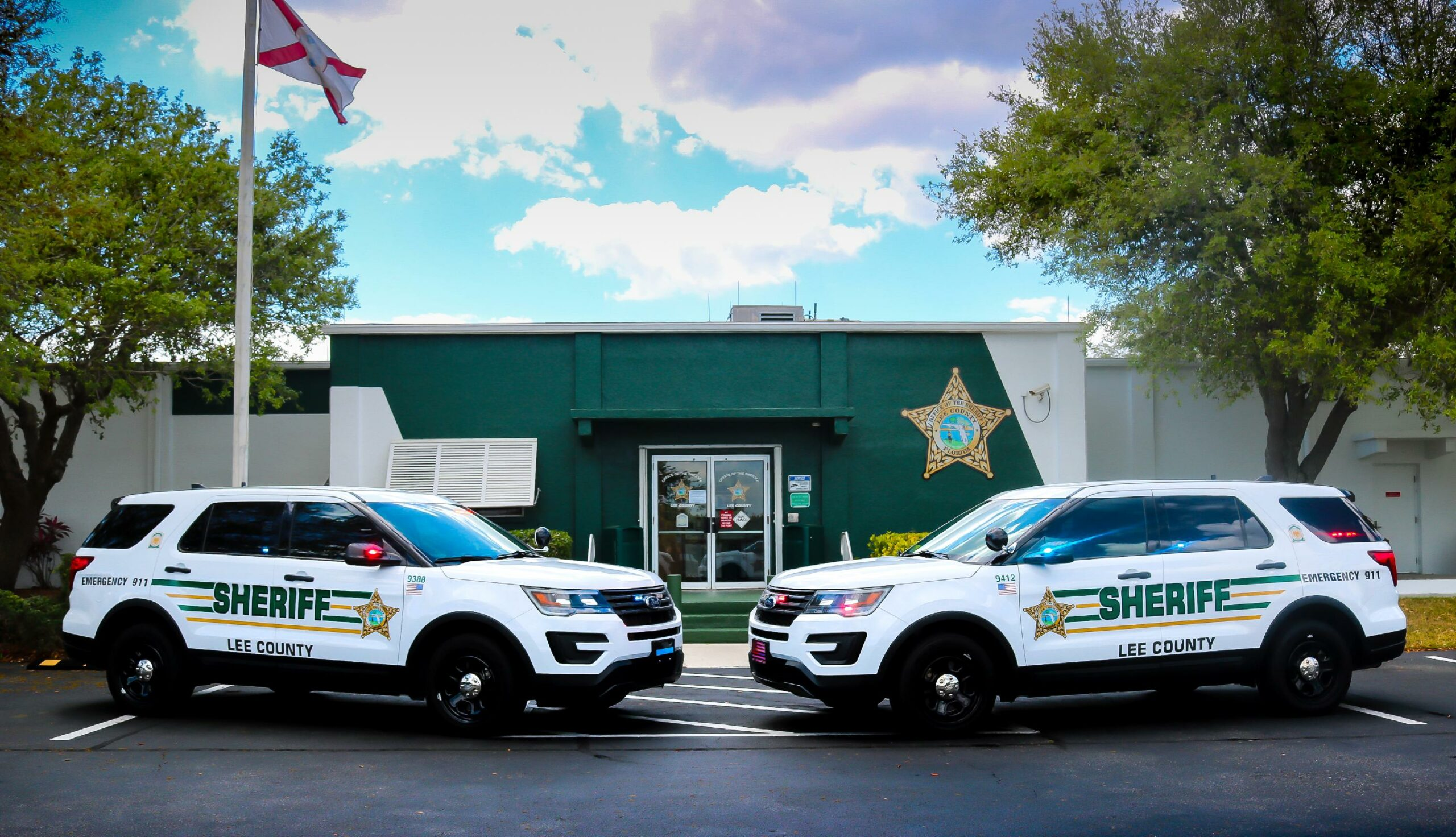
Lee County Sheriff's Office patrol car

The Lee County Sheriff's Office is the primary law enforcement agency for Lee County, Florida headquartered in Fort Myers, Florida.

The Lee County Sheriff's Office responds to all calls for service within unincorporated Lee County and employs civilian dispatchers who provide dispatch for LCSO Deputies and Florida SouthWestern State College Police. The Cape Coral Police Department, Fort Myers Police Department, Sanibel Police Department and Lee County Port Authority Police maintain their own police dispatch centers.

The Lee County Sheriff's Office is also responsible for corrections, court operations, and civil proceedings. There are multiple specialized units within the agency including Aviation, K9, SOU, Fugitive Warrants, Marine, Electronic Surveillance, and Tactical Narcotics Teams.

== Education ==
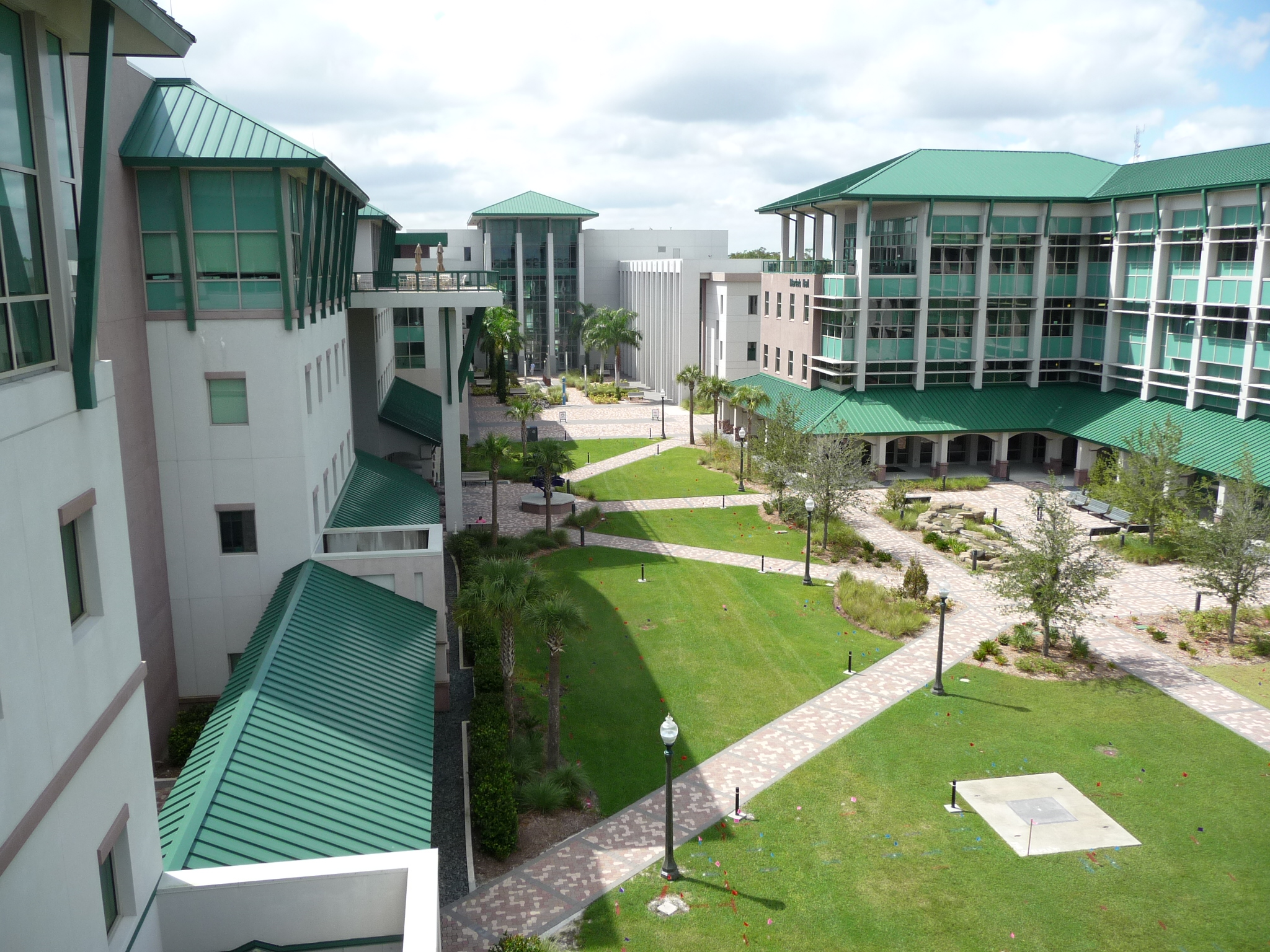
FGCU's Academic Core

Colleges in Lee County include Florida Gulf Coast University (FGCU), Barry University, Nova Southeastern University, Florida SouthWestern State College, Cape Coral Technical College, Fort Myers Technical College, Hodges University, Keiser University, Southern Technical College, and Rasmussen College.

FGCU is a public university located just south of the Southwest Florida International Airport in South Fort Myers. The university belongs to the 12-campus State University System of Florida. FGCU competes in the ASUN Conference in NCAA Division I sports. The school is accredited by the Commission on Colleges of the Southern Association of Colleges and Schools to award associate's, 51 different types of bachelor's, 29 different master's, and six types of doctoral degrees.

== Parks and recreation ==
The parks are maintained by the county's Parks & Recreation Department. The department also maintains spring training facilities for the Boston Red Sox and Minnesota Twins.

== Beaches ==
Some of the main tourist attractions in Southwest Florida are its beaches. Lee County is home to ten beach parks and an additional seven beach accesses, maintained by Lee County Parks & Recreation.

Popular beaches include Fort Myers Beach, Sanibel and Captiva Island, Bonita Beach, Bunchee Beach, and Lovers Key.

== Libraries ==
The Lee County Library System has 13 branches. The towns of Fort Myers Beach and Sanibel Island, though located in Lee County, maintain their own independent public library entities.

The Lee County Library System currently provides more than 294,000 county residents with over 1.5 million items and materials available for use or patron circulation, as well as an online library materials catalog, free wi-fi, public computer access, and scanning and printing capabilities.

== Politics ==
Unlike most urban counties, Lee County is a Republican stronghold in presidential elections. It was one of the first areas of Florida to break away from a Solid South voting pattern. The last Democratic presidential candidate to win the county was Franklin D. Roosevelt in 1944. Since then, Adlai Stevenson II, Lyndon Johnson, Jimmy Carter and Barack Obama have been the only Democrats to manage 40 percent of the vote.

Lee County is represented in the United States House of Representatives by Byron Donalds of the 19th district and by Greg Steube of the 17th district. Most of the county is in the 19th, while the far eastern portion is in the 17th.

United States presidential election results for Lee County, Florida
Year	Republican		Democratic		Third party(ies)	
Year	No.	%	No.	%	No.	%
1892	0	0.00%	153	96.23%	6	3.77%
1896	74	23.72%	222	71.15%	16	5.13%
1900	39	11.40%	278	81.29%	25	7.31%
1904	84	17.04%	266	53.96%	143	29.01%
1908	72	13.51%	266	49.91%	195	36.59%
1912	38	5.32%	432	60.50%	244	34.17%
1916	167	14.75%	751	66.34%	214	18.90%
1920	626	36.95%	938	55.37%	130	7.67%
1924	552	34.03%	845	52.10%	225	13.87%
1928	2,058	63.17%	1,154	35.42%	46	1.41%
1932	973	27.56%	2,557	72.44%	0	0.00%
1936	1,137	30.85%	2,549	69.15%	0	0.00%
1940	1,622	31.48%	3,531	68.52%	0	0.00%
1944	1,865	35.74%	3,353	64.26%	0	0.00%
1948	2,276	39.26%	1,883	32.48%	1,638	28.26%
1952	5,528	59.09%	3,828	40.91%	0	0.00%
1956	7,565	62.60%	4,520	37.40%	0	0.00%
1960	10,357	65.34%	5,494	34.66%	0	0.00%
1964	12,886	55.81%	10,204	44.19%	0	0.00%
1968	14,376	46.23%	7,978	25.66%	8,741	28.11%
1972	36,738	79.46%	9,404	20.34%	93	0.20%
1976	38,038	54.50%	30,567	43.80%	1,184	1.70%
1980	61,033	64.51%	28,125	29.73%	5,455	5.77%
1984	85,024	73.89%	30,022	26.09%	30	0.03%
1988	87,303	67.71%	40,725	31.59%	908	0.70%
1992	73,436	44.24%	53,660	32.32%	38,906	23.44%
1996	80,898	48.75%	65,699	39.59%	19,354	11.66%
2000	106,151	57.57%	73,571	39.90%	4,678	2.54%
2004	144,176	59.91%	93,860	39.00%	2,631	1.09%
2008	147,608	54.67%	119,701	44.34%	2,668	0.99%
2012	154,163	57.83%	110,157	41.32%	2,278	0.85%
2016	191,551	58.12%	124,908	37.90%	13,095	3.97%
2020	233,247	59.09%	157,695	39.95%	3,816	0.97%
2024	250,661	63.60%	139,240	35.33%	4,204	1.07%

=== Voter demographics ===
As of May 31, 2024.

Voter registration and party membership
Party	Number of voters	Percentage
Republican	222,828	47.4%
No party affiliation	127,524	27.1%
Democratic	107,327	22.8%
Minor parties	12,432	2.6%
Total	470,111	100.0%

== Transportation ==
=== Airports ===
- Southwest Florida International Airport (IATA airport code – RSW), in South Fort Myers, serves over 8.37 million passengers annually. Currently, the airport offers international non-stop flights to Cancun, Mexico; Frankfurt, Germany; Nassau, Bahamas; and Montreal, Ottawa and Toronto in Canada. In addition, nine airlines operate flights to 29 domestic nonstop destinations. On September 9, 2005, the airport opened a new terminal.

- Page Field (IATA airport code – FMY), also in South Fort Myers, just south of the incorporated limits of the City of Fort Myers, is the county's general aviation airport. Prior to the opening of Southwest Florida Regional Airport in 1983 (now Southwest Florida International Airport), Page Field was the county's commercial airport.

=== Seaports and marine transport ===
A small port operation continues in Boca Grande, being used as a way-point for oil distribution. However, Port Boca Grande has been in decline for many years as the shipping industry has moved north, especially to the Port of Tampa.

In addition, a private enterprise operates a high-speed, passenger-only ferry service between Fort Myers Beach from San Carlos Island and Key West. Another ferry service is offered from Fort Myers to Key West.

=== Major highways ===
Interstate 75	The county's only fully controlled-access freeway, and has 10 interchanges within Lee County, linking the area to Naples, Fort Lauderdale, and Miami to the south and east; and Sarasota and Tampa to the north. The freeway is at least six lanes throughout Lee County and is up to eight lanes in some areas.
U.S. Route 41; Tamiami Trail; Cleveland Avenue	US 41 runs the length of Lee County, and is the county's main north–south arterial highway. It is a major commercial corridor, running as an elevated highway through the center of downtown Fort Myers, continuing south as a multilane, divided-surface highway through the communities of South Fort Myers, San Carlos Park, Estero, and Bonita Springs. From north-to-south, the highway's name starts as "North Tamiami Trail", changes to "Cleveland Avenue" from the Caloosahatchee River to State Road 884 (Colonial Boulevard) in the City of Fort Myers; then it is called "South Cleveland Avenue" from Colonial Boulevard to County Road 876 (Daniels Parkway), and then changes to South Tamiami Trail until the border with Collier County.
State Road 80; Palm Beach Boulevard	SR 80's western terminus is in downtown Fort Myers. The multilane highway runs east-northeast along the southern banks of the Caloosahatchee River as "Palm Beach Boulevard" within the county, traversing the state of Florida to connect the area with LaBelle, Clewiston, and West Palm Beach.
State Road 82; Dr. Martin Luther King Jr. Boulevard; Immokalee Road	SR 82's western terminus is in downtown Fort Myers. The highway is called "Dr. Martin Luther King Jr. Boulevard" within the incorporated limits of the City of Fort Myers, becoming "Immokalee Road" as it passes through Lehigh Acres and connects the area to Immokalee.
State Road 884; Veterans Memorial Parkway; Colonial Boulevard; Lee Boulevard	SR 884 is Lee County's main east–west arterial highway. Its western terminus is in the incorporated limits of the City of Cape Coral and the eastern terminus is in Lehigh Acres. Within Cape Coral, the highway is named "Veterans' Memorial Parkway", and is a multilane, controlled-access highway. Within Fort Myers, it is named "Colonial Boulevard". The road crosses the Caloosahatchee River as an elevated highway across a toll bridge, interchanging with U.S. Highway 41 and Interstate 75, then becomes a multilane, divided-surface highway through Lehigh Acres. After it intersects with State Road 82, it is called "Lee Boulevard".

=== Major road bridges ===
- Caloosahatchee Bridge (U.S. Highway 41): 4-travel-lane single-span bridge connects North Fort Myers with Fort Myers, over the Caloosahatchee River.
- Cape Coral Bridge (College Parkway/Cape Coral Parkway): 4-travel-lane single-span bridge (two eastbound, two westbound) connect Cape Coral with Cypress Lake, over the Caloosahatchee River.
- Edison Bridge (State Road 739): Two 3-travel-lane spans (one northbound, one southbound) connect North Fort Myers with Fort Myers, over the Caloosahatchee River.
- Interstate 75: Two 4-travel-lane spans (one northbound, one southbound) between the State Road 78 ("Bayshore Road") and State Road 80 ("Palm Beach Boulevard") interchanges, over the Caloosahatchee River.
- Matanzas Pass Bridge (State Road 865): 3-travel-lane single-span bridge crosses Hurricane Bay and Matanzas Pass within the incorporated limits of the Town of Fort Myers Beach, connecting the mainland to the barrier islands.
- Midpoint Memorial Bridge (County Road 884): 4-lane single-span bridge that connects Cape Coral with Fort Myers, over the Caloosahatchee River.
- Pine Island Causeway (County Road 78): a small single-leaf drawbridge connecting Cape Coral to Matlacha and Pine Island
- Sanibel Causeway: series of three 2-travel-lane single-span bridges and two 3-travel-lane island causeways crossing the mouth of the Caloosahatchee River at the Gulf of Mexico. The causeway connects Punta Rassa with Sanibel.
- Wilson Pigott Bridge (State Road 31): 2-travel-lane single-span drawbridge between State Road 78 ("Bayshore Road") and State Road 80, over the Caloosahatchee River.

=== Mass transportation ===
Fixed-route bus service is provided by the Lee County Transit Department, operated as "LeeTran". Several routes extend outward from the Downtown Intermodal Transfer Center; in addition, suburb-to-suburb routes are operated, as well as park-and-ride service to and from both Fort Myers Beach and Southwest Florida International Airport.

The Downtown Intermodal Transfer Center in Fort Myers also serves as an intermediate stop on Greyhound Lines bus service.

== Media ==
=== Newspapers ===
Newspapers include The News-Press and Florida Weekly.

=== Radio ===
Arbitron standard radio market: Ft Myers-Naples-Marco Island. With an Arbitron-assigned 783,100 listening area population, the metropolitan area ranks 62/299 for the fall of 2006. The metropolitan area is home to 32 radio stations.

=== Television ===
Nielsen Media Research designated market area: Ft. Myers-Naples

Number of TV homes: 479,130

2006–2007 U.S. rank: 64/210

- WBBH – NBC affiliate
- WFTX – Fox affiliate
- WGCU – PBS member station
- WINK – CBS affiliate
- WINK-DT2 – MyNetworkTV/Antenna TV affiliate
- WRXY – Christian Television Network affiliate
- WTPH – Azteca America affiliate
- WUVF – Univision affiliate
- WWDT – Telemundo affiliate
- WXCW – CW television network affiliate
- WZVN – ABC affiliate

== Sports ==
Club	Sport	League	Tier	Venue (capacity)
Florida Everblades	Ice hockey	ECHL	Mid-level	Hertz Arena, Estero (7,181)
Fort Myers Mighty Mussels	Baseball	Florida State League	Class A	Hammond Stadium, S. Fort Myers (7,500)
Boston Red Sox	Baseball	Major League Baseball	Spring training	JetBlue Park at Fenway South, Fort Myers (11,000)
Minnesota Twins	Baseball	Major League Baseball	Spring training	Hammond Stadium, S. Fort Myers (7,500)
Florida Gulf Coast Eagles	Basketball	ASUN Conference	Division I (NCAA)	Alico Arena, Fort Myers (4,500)

Fort Myers is home to Florida Gulf Coast University. Its teams, the Florida Gulf Coast Eagles, play in NCAA Division I in the ASUN Conference. The Eagles' men's basketball team had an average attendance of 2,291 in 2013.

=== MLB spring training ===
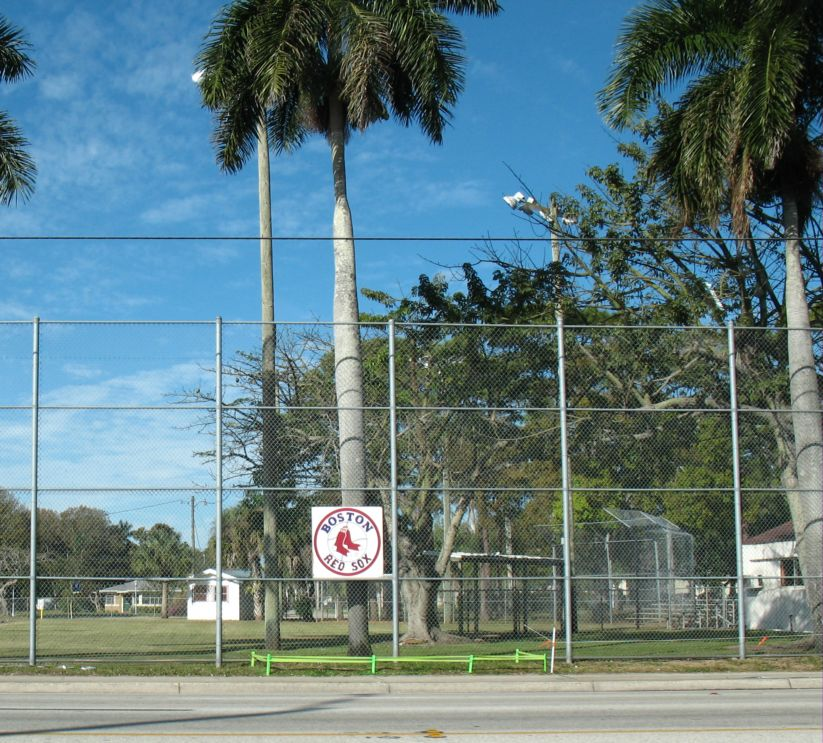
Red Sox logo on the fence outside the City of Palms Park

The Boston Red Sox hold their annual spring training at JetBlue Park at Fenway South in the Fort Myers area. A cross-town rivalry has developed with the Minnesota Twins, which conduct their spring training at Hammond Stadium in south Lee County, which has a capacity of 7,500 and opened in 1991.

The Red Sox' lease with Fort Myers ran through 2019, but the Red Sox were considering exercising the early out in their contract that would have allowed them to leave following the 2009 spring season. On October 28, 2008, the Lee County commission voted 3–1 to approve an agreement with the Boston Red Sox to build a new spring-training facility for the team in south Lee County. That stadium, named JetBlue Park at Fenway South, is located off Daniels Parkway near Southwest Florida International Airport. The stadium opened in time for the 2012 season.

City of Palms Park had been built in 1992 for the Red Sox' spring training. Former Red Sox left fielder Mike Greenwell was from Fort Myers, and was instrumental in bringing his team to the city for spring training. From 2024 until his death in 2025, he served as a Lee County Commissioner. The deal for JetBlue Park left City of Palms Park without a tenant. County officials have discussed the possibility of securing another team for City of Palms. Terry Park Ballfield (also known as the Park T. Pigott Memorial Stadium) in East Fort Myers is also not currently in use by a Major League Baseball team, though it is the former home of the Philadelphia Athletics, Cleveland Indians, Pittsburgh Pirates, and Kansas City Royals.

== Communities ==
=== Cities ===
- Bonita Springs
- Cape Coral
- Fort Myers
- Sanibel

=== Town ===
- Fort Myers Beach

=== Village ===
- Estero

=== Municipal district ===
- Lehigh Acres

=== Census-designated places ===
- Alva
- Bokeelia
- Buckingham
- Burnt Store Marina
- Captiva
- Charleston Park
- Cypress Lake
- East Dunbar (former CDP; since annexed by city of Fort Myers)
- Florida Gulf Coast University
- Fort Myers Shores
- Gateway
- Harlem Heights
- Iona
- Lochmoor Waterway Estates
- Matlacha (on Matlacha Island)
- Matlacha Isles-Matlacha Shores
- McGregor
- North Fort Myers
- Olga
- Page Park
- Palmona Park
- Pine Island Center
- Pine Manor
- Pineland (on Pine Island)
- Punta Rassa
- San Carlos Park
- St. James City
- Suncoast Estates
- Tanglewood (former CDP)
- Three Oaks
- Tice
- Verandah
- Villas
- Whiskey Creek

=== Other unincorporated communities ===
- Babcock Ranch (part)
- Boca Grande (part)
- Cayo Costa

=== CDP'S and Unincorporated Communities ===
- Burnt Store Marina

== See also ==
- List of memorials to Robert E. Lee
- National Register of Historic Places listings in Lee County, Florida
- Southwest Florida
