= School District of Lee County (Florida) =

School district in Florida, USA

Address
- 2855 Colonial Boulevard Fort Myers, Florida, 33966; United States
- Coordinates: 26.3350839°N 81.7748082°W

District information
- Type: Public
- Grades: PreK–12
- Established: 1887; 139 years ago
- Schools: 119
- NCES District ID: 1201080

Students and staff
- Students: 94,927
- Teachers: 5,156.15 (FTE)
- Staff: 5,951.36 (FTE)
- Student–teacher ratio: 18.41

Other information
- Website: www.leeschools.net

The School District of Lee County manages public education in Lee County, Florida. As of the 2019–20 school year, there were 95,647 students attending 119 schools in the district, which had an operating budget of $1.327 billion.

The District school choice system is an open-enrollment system for school assignments and goes through the Student Assignment Office. A lottery process is used to assign students to schools when the number of applicants for a school exceeds the number of available seats. Students’ applications are assigned random numbers to determine the order in which their applications will be considered in the assignment process.

== Integration ==
While Brown v. Board of Education outlawed segregated public schools in 1954, Lee County opted to ignore the ruling. In 1964, a student named Rosalind Blalock attempted to enroll in Fort Myers High School, but was denied admission to the whites-only school. A court case filed on her behalf by the NAACP resulted in a court order that forced Lee County to begin integrating the public schools. Prior to that time, Lee maintained a system that was separate but not equal for minority students. The district proceeded, first by integrating the teachers, then the elementary schools, and finally the high schools. In 1969, traditionally black Dunbar High School was closed, and students were reassigned to various white high schools around the county. The situation was often tense, with a riot breaking out at Fort Myers High School, and administrators at Fort Myers High School pretended not to recognize a black coach, causing police officers to send attack dogs after him. The court order stayed in place for 35 years, and many of its measures are still in place today.

== Post-secondary ==
Fort Myers Technical College
Cape Coral Technical College

== High schools ==
- Alva High School
- Bonita Springs High School
- Cape Coral High School
- Cypress Lake High School
- Dunbar High School
- East Lee County High School
- Estero High School
- Fort Myers Senior High School
- Gateway High School
- Ida S. Baker High School
- Island Coast High School
- Lehigh Senior High School
- Mariner High School
- North Fort Myers High School
- Riverdale High School
- South Fort Myers High School

== Middle schools ==
- Bonita Springs Middle School
- Caloosa Middle School
- Challenger Middle School
- Cypress Lake Middle School
- Diplomat Middle School
- Fort Myers Middle Academy
- Gulf Middle School
- Harns Marsh Middle School
- Lehigh Acres Middle School
- Lexington Middle School
- Mariner Middle School
- Oak Hammock Middle School
- Paul Laurence Dunbar Middle School
- Three Oaks Middle School
- Trafalgar Middle School
- Varsity Lakes Middle School

== Elementary schools ==
- Allen Park Elementary
- Amanecer Elementary
- Bonita Springs Elementary
- Caloosa Elementary
- Cape Elementary
- Colonial Elementary
- Diplomat Elementary
- Dr. Carrie D. Robinson Littleton Elementary
- Edgewood Academy
- Edison Park Creative and Expressive Arts School
- Fort Myers Beach Elementary
- Franklin Park Magnet
- G. Weaver Hipps Elementary School
- Gateway Elementary
- Green Meadow Elementary School
- Gulf Elementary
- Hancock Creek Elementary
- Harns Marsh Elementary
- Hector A. Cafferata Jr. Elementary
- Heights Elementary
- J. Colin English Elementary
- Lehigh Elementary
- Manatee Elementary
- Mirror Lakes Elementary
- Orange River Elementary
- Orangewood Elementary
- Patriot Elementary
- Pelican Elementary
- Pine Island Elementary
- Pinewoods Elementary
- Ray V. Pottorf Elementary
- Rayma C. Page Elementary
- River Hall Elementary
- San Carlos Park Elementary
- Skyline Elementary
- Spring Creek Elementary
- Sunshine Elementary
- Tanglewood Elementary
- Three Oaks Elementary
- Tice Elementary
- Tortuga Preserve Elementary
- Trafalgar Elementary
- Treeline Elementary
- Tropic Isles Elementary
- Villas Elementary

== Charter/Special/K-8 Schools ==
- Bayshore School K-8 (Part of the school District)
- Florida SouthWestern Collegiate High School (Lee Campus)
- Gateway Charter School
- Gateway Charter High School
- James Stephens Community School K-6 (Part of the school District)
- North Fort Myers Academy for the Arts K-8 (Part of the school District)
- Six Mile Charter Academy
- The Sanibel School K-8 (Part of the school District)
- The Alva School K-8 (Part of the school District)
- Veterans Park Academy for the Arts K-8 (Part of the school District)

== Former Schools ==
- Alva Elementary
- Alva Middle School

== See also ==
List of school districts in Florida
