= Lee County Multiple Property Submission =

- U.S. National Register of Historic Places
- Location: Lee County, Florida
- MPS
- NRHP reference No.: 64500116

The following buildings were added to the National Register of Historic Places as part of the Lee County Multiple Property Submission (or MPS).

Resource Name	Also known as	Address	City	Added
Boca Grande Community Center	Boca Grande School	east of Park Avenue, between 1st and 2nd Streets	Boca Grande	March 30, 1995
Olga School		South Olga Road	Olga	April 27, 1995
Terry Park Ballfield	Park T. Pigott Memorial Stadium	3410 Palm Beach Boulevard	Fort Myers	June 20, 1995
Boca Grande Quarantine Station		833 Belcher Road	Boca Grande	March 22, 1996
Gilmer Heitman House		2577 1st Street	Fort Myers	September 27, 1996
Casa Rio	S. W. Stribley House	2424 McGregor Boulevard	Fort Myers	October 24, 1996
Edison Park Elementary School	Edison Park Creative and Express Elementary School	2401 Euclid Avenue	Fort Myers	May 5, 1999
Alva Consolidated Schools	Alva Elementary and Middle School	21291 North River Road	Alva	June 10, 1999
Bonita Springs School	Bonita Springs Elementary School	10701 Dean Street	Bonita Springs	July 8, 1999
Fort Myers Beach School	Fort Myers Beach Elementary School	2751 Oak Street	Fort Myers Beach	July 8, 1999
J. Colin English School	J. Colin English Elementary School	120 Pine Island Road	North Fort Myers	July 8, 1999
Sanibel Colored School	Sanibel School	520 Tarpon Bay Road	Sanibel	July 8, 1999
Tice Grammar School		4524 Tice Street	Tice	July 8, 1999
Whidden's Marina		190 1st Street East	Boca Grande	December 28, 2000

== Gallery ==
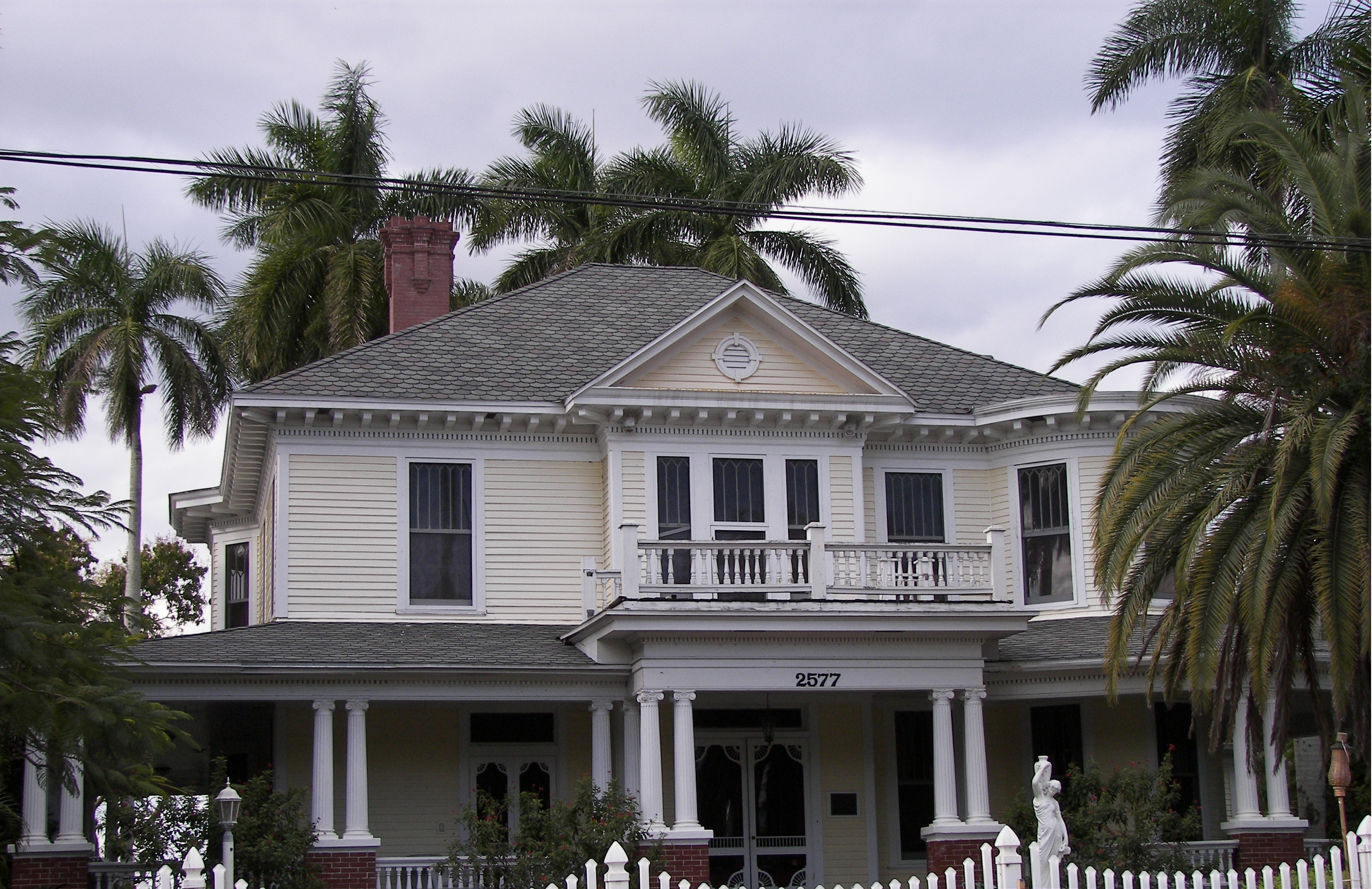
Gilmer Heitman House

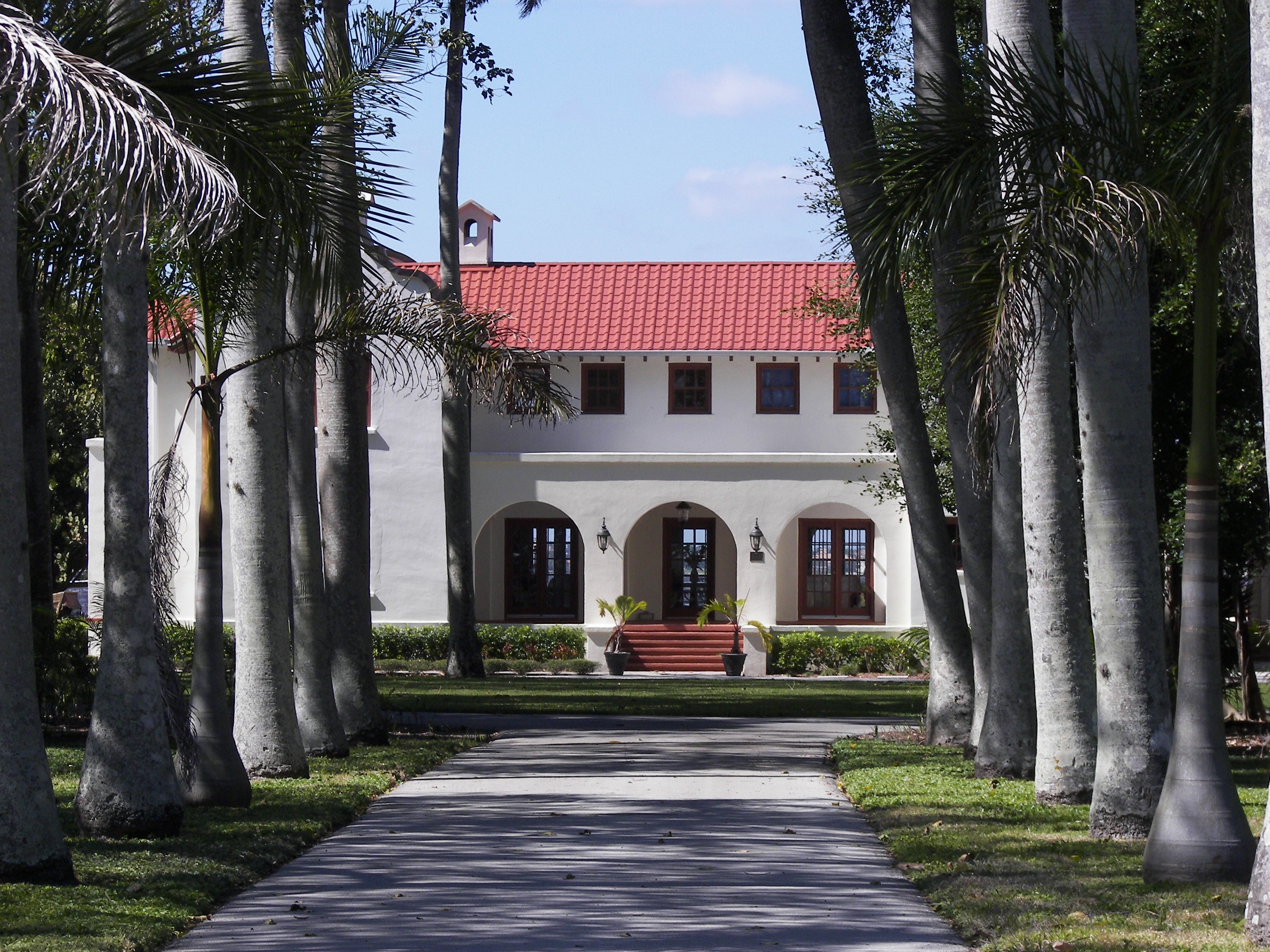
Casa Rio

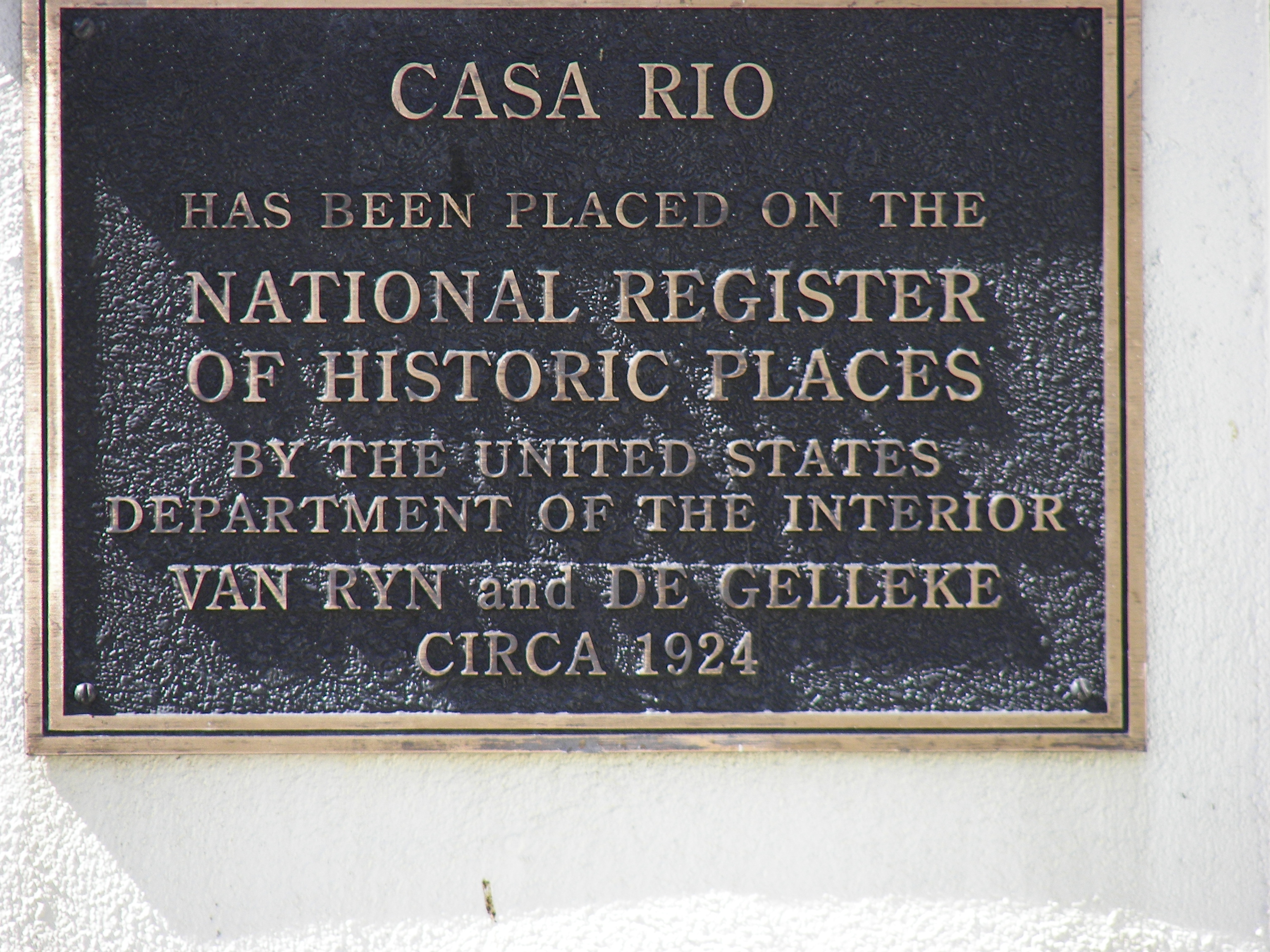
Sign in front of Casa Rio

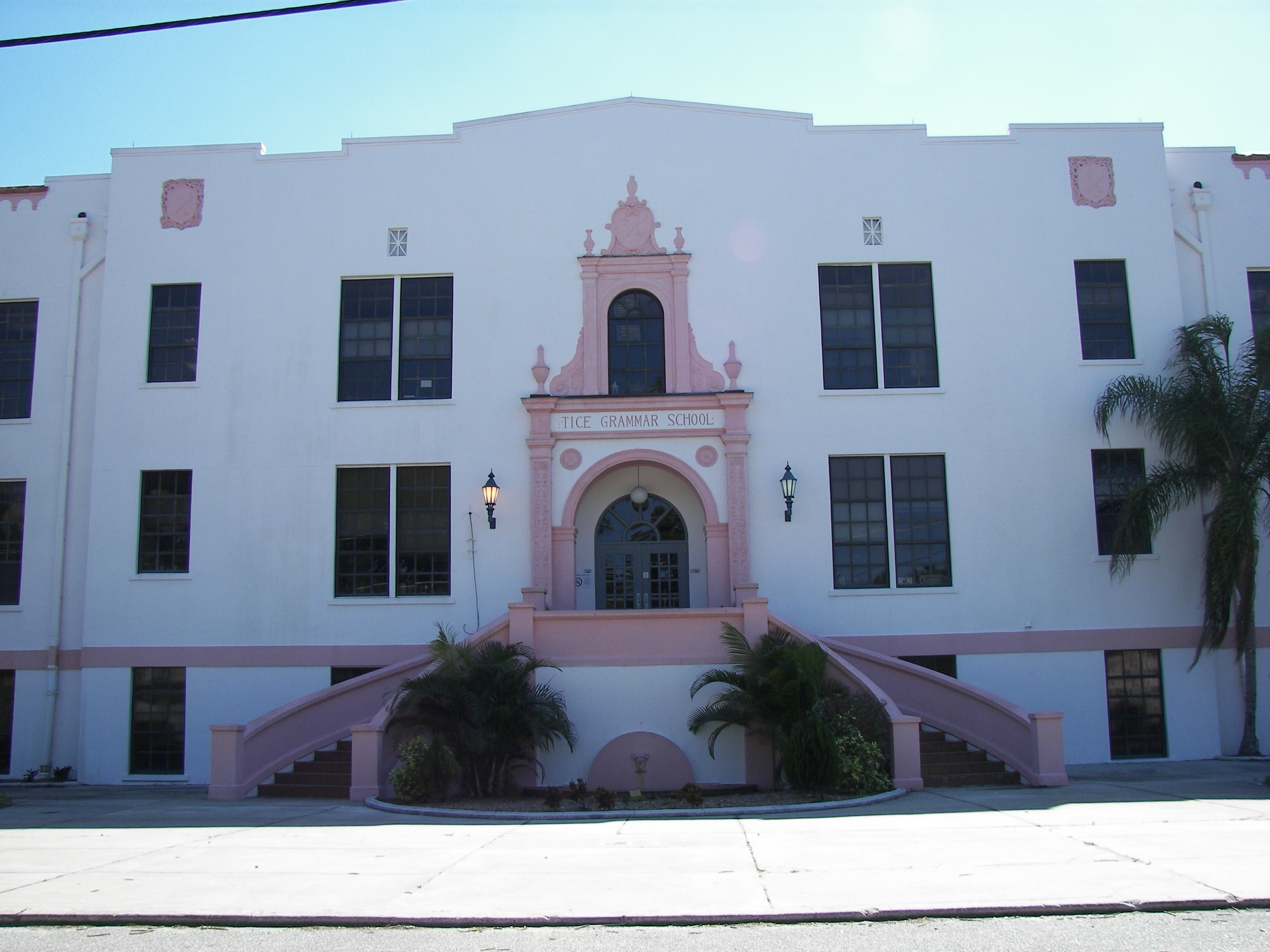
Tice Grammar School
