= Colin English =

American superintendent (1895–1986)

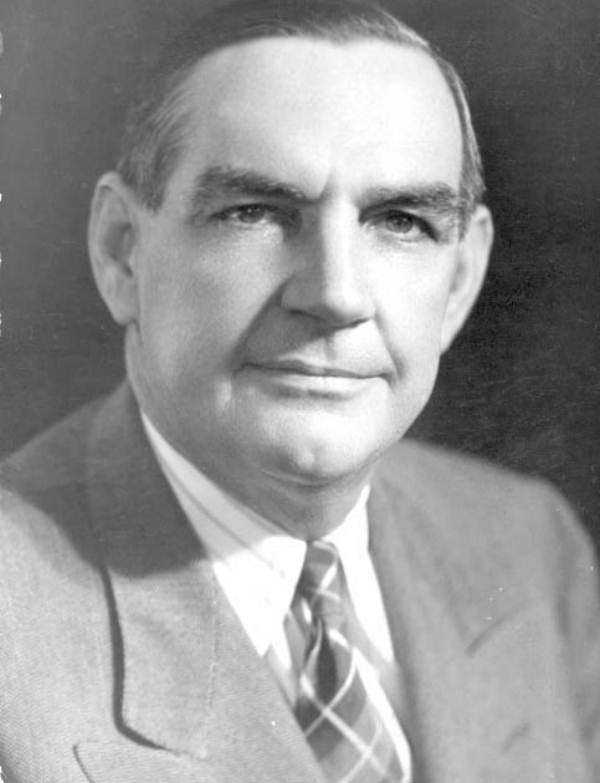
John Colin English (circa 1947)

John Colin English (July 3, 1895 – June 3, 1986) was an American superintendent. He was Florida Superintendent of Education from 1937 until 1949. He was elected to the office in 1936. He campaigned for governor in 1948.

== Biography ==
John Colin English was born July 3, 1895, in Alva, Florida, and died June 3, 1986, at age 90, in Tallahassee, Florida.

During his tenure as education secretary, funding was an issue during the Great Depression. His tenure also included the World War II era.

His 1947 campaign for governor finished third. He was involved in the design of Dunbar High School.

J. Colin English Elementary School in Fort Myers was named in his honor in 1929 even though at the time he thought it was a mistake. He said "I didn't think it was such a good idea to name a school after a fellow who was still active", and when asked to erect the plaque in the building honoring him he refused, saying that it was the only request from the board that he did not do. However, by the school's 50th anniversary he had decided that it was actually "pretty good".

He married Ruth McWilliams English, who died June 3, 1995, at age 96. Their son John Colin English Jr survived them both.

== See also ==
- Florida Department of Education
