= Sanibel Colored School =

- U.S. National Register of Historic Places
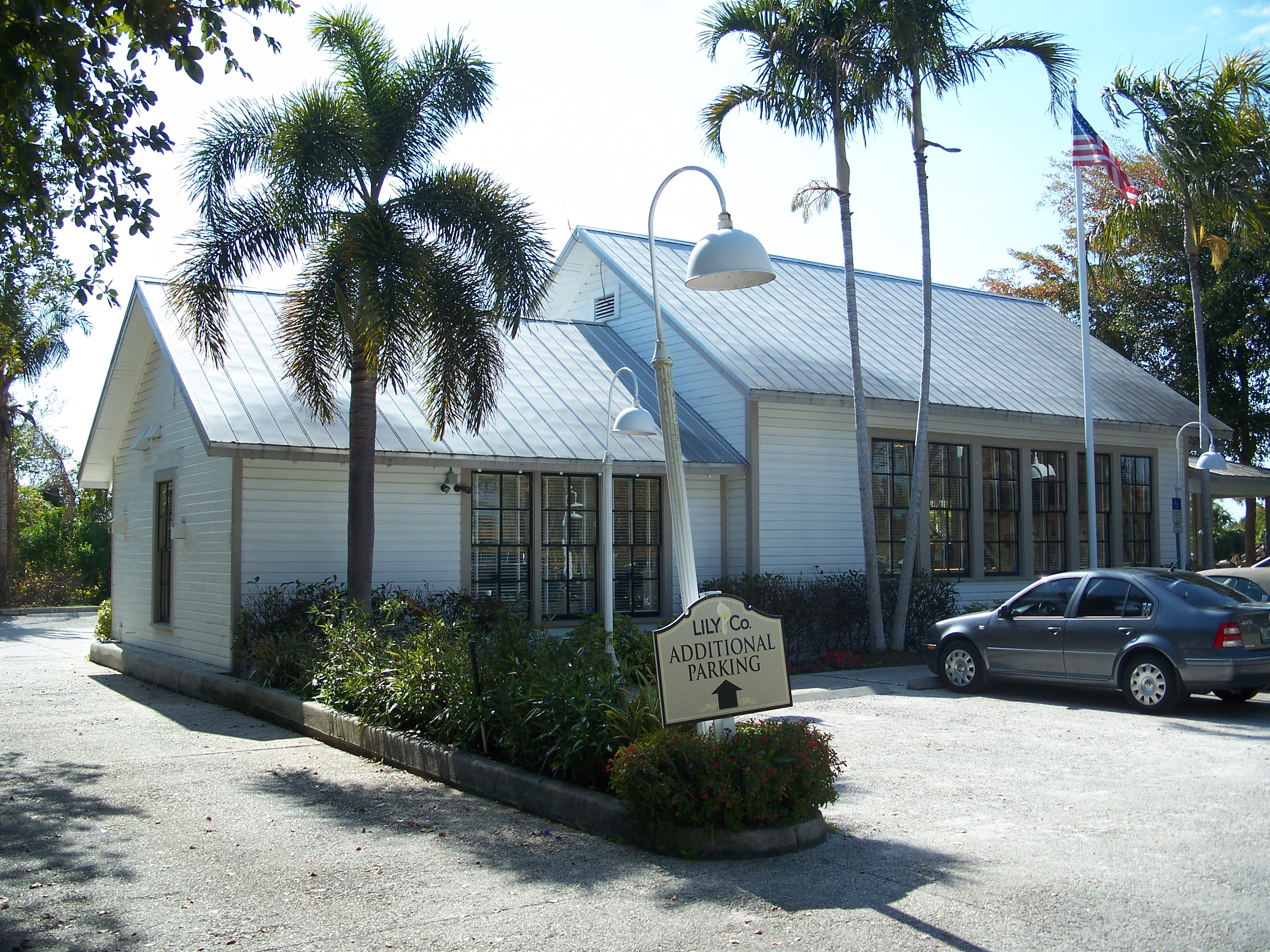

- Location within Florida Location within the United States
- Location: Sanibel, Florida
- Coordinates: 26°26′21″N 82°3′53″W
- MPS: Lee County Multiple Property Submission
- NRHP reference No.: 99000797
- Added to NRHP: July 8, 1999

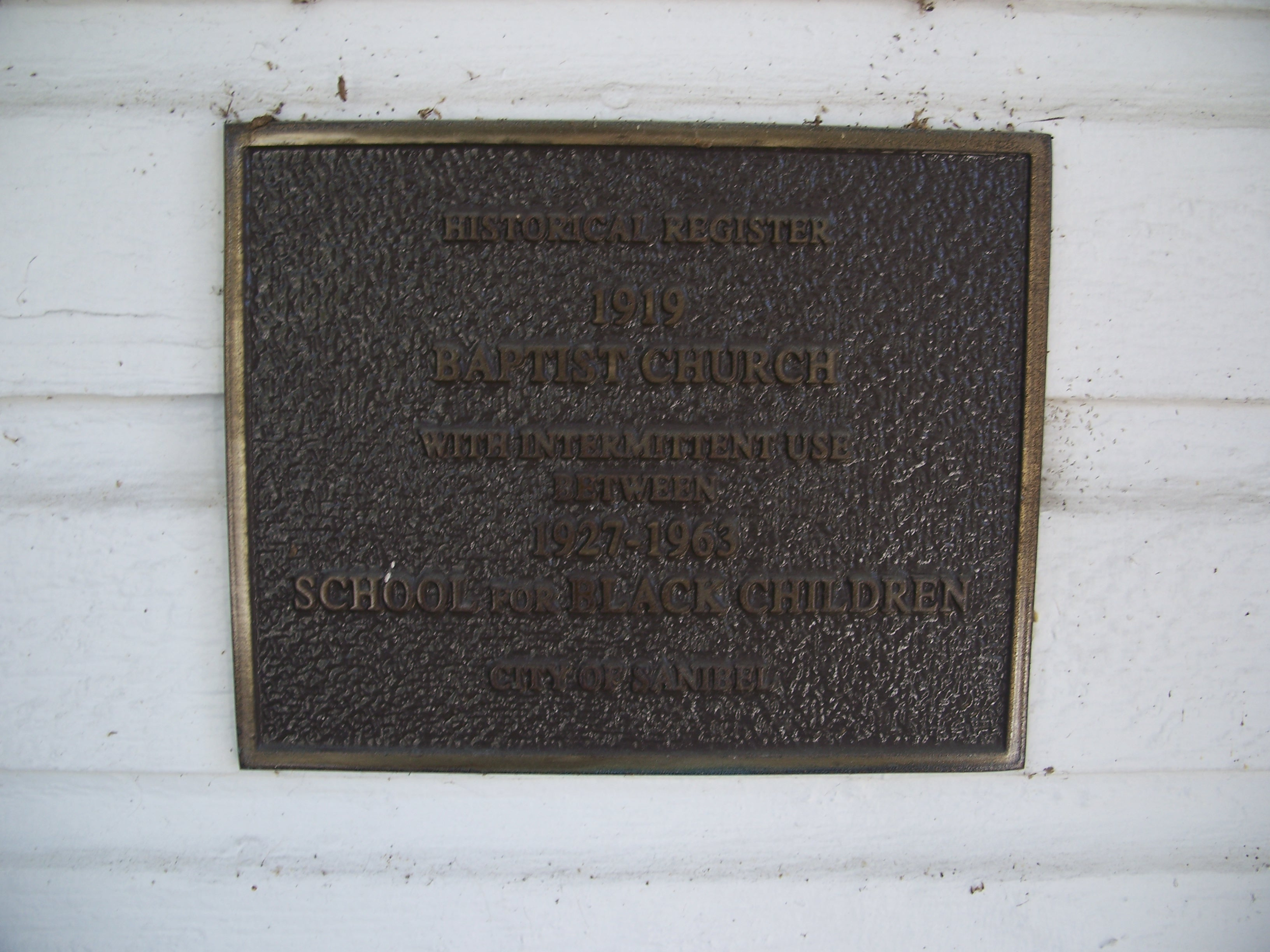
This shows certification of the Sanibel Colored School being recognized.

Sanibel Colored School, also known as Sanibel School, is a U.S. National Registered Historic school located in Sanibel, Florida. Starting all the way from 1914, schooling in Sanibel started from a Baptist church that James Johnson built on Sanibel Island. Thirteen years later, Johnson gave black families the opportunity to use the church for schooling for the children which later resulted in the Lee County Board of Public Instruction buying it for a little over $1,000. Schooling with them was a little bit different from regular schooling, because they only needed seven children in order to operate school with grades 1-8. With the population in Sanibel being 90 people, it was a little hard to keep up with the school because children were 9th-12th graders. A little after, it got to the point where the school had to close their doors. In the year of 1962, the Lee County School Board put the schools up for sale.

== History ==
=== Sanibel Island ===
Sanibel Island is a small island, only about 12 miles long and 3 miles wide. It is the neighbor of Captiva Island. They are both located on the west coast of Florida. The Calusa Indians were the first to inhabit the island before the Spaniards took over the island to find valuables, such as gold. The Indians died off because of the Spanish bringing disease over to the island. The island was completely isolated, which meant no electricity or running water. The island became a great place to farm until hurricanes would flood most of the island and ruin the fields. Blacks and whites left the island or went to Captiva or the mainland to find more work. Most whites resorted back to Florida, therefore, African Americans started building their own communities and the Sanibel Colored School. Once the school closed during World War II (1940-1946), black children barely went to school until the integrated Sanibel Elementary was opened in 1963.

During the 2000s, there was a decline in the African American population on Sanibel and Captiva islands due to the rising cost of living. The founding black families were the only African Americans left on the island.

=== Gavin-Walker Family ===
The first black family to arrive on Sanibel about 100 years ago and closely followed by the second family. In 1917, Isaiah and Hannah Gavin moved to Sanibel from Wakulla County which was near Tallahassee. A few years later, Harry Walker, SR. and his wife, Pearl Alice Walker, moved to the island from Georgia. Both families would later combine into the Gavin-Walker family and culminated twenty children, fifteen of which are still alive today. It would be years before these initial settlers would have their very own space for education. The black families were in search of a building to use for schooling in Sanibel given that no other school was available to them in their town. James Johnson, who constructed the Baptist Church in Sanibel, opened the doors for black families to use as a school in as early as 1924 although was not formally introduced to families until 1927. The families no longer had to travel to Dunbar in order to receive schooling for their children.

Velma and Eugene Gavin held a family reunion that most of the siblings attended. Eugene's parents, Edmund and Elnora, were pioneers in Southwest Florida, first on Captiva, then in the 1930s, Sanibel. Eugene is the fifth child of Edmund and Elnora. Eugene's father was described as being tough on discipline but a loving man, being honored as grand marshal in the city's 10-year anniversary parade. The family was very self-reliant and used many farming methods including raising livestock, fruits and vegetables, palms and pine to cook and to build. For their income, the Gavin family would sell beach shells. The Gavin's are now recognized as Sanibel royalty.

=== Layout of School ===
It was quite simple. It was a single roomed school house, with many rows of desks inside. The desk were wooden and had some metal to support the children that sat in them. There was wooden floors, and the teacher as well had a wooden desk and a wooden chair to sit in. There was a black chalkboard behind the teacher's desk, and on top of the desk was a globe and other essentials that the teacher may have needed. An American flag was alongside of the chalkboard as well.

The Sanibel School House, a one-room classroom, which eventually would expand to two rooms. It featured a wood stove and oven that was used to feed the children and keep warm in the winter, and the rows of students were organized by grade level. Whichever desk was closest to the fireplace oversaw keeping the fire lit and warm for the cold days. It would be used as a church in the years 1910-1919 on Sundays. Though the school was segregated, petitions between white and black families to end segregation in schools, the first school in Lee County. Grades 1-4 learned in the original room and grades 5-8 spent their time in the expanded room. Teachers weren't paid well at the time, one of the first teachers, Nancy McCann was paid $2.50 per child per semester. In 1964 the schoolhouse was vacated, by 1965 it was turned into a theater.

=== Sanibel School and Integration ===
In 1963, the new school of Sanibel was built, but it was still segregated so students had to travel to Dunbar. Before they decided to segregate, teachers went around asking the white parents would they be ok with letting the kids ride the bus with them. The parents said yes, and one year later in 1964, the kids were riding to school together. “The Sanibel School became the first in Lee County and one of the first in Florida or the South to integrate — one year ahead of the 1964 Civil Rights Act and five years before Lee County was forced to integrate all its schools by a 1969 court order”.
