= Paul Laurence Dunbar School (Fort Myers, Florida) =

- U.S. National Register of Historic Places
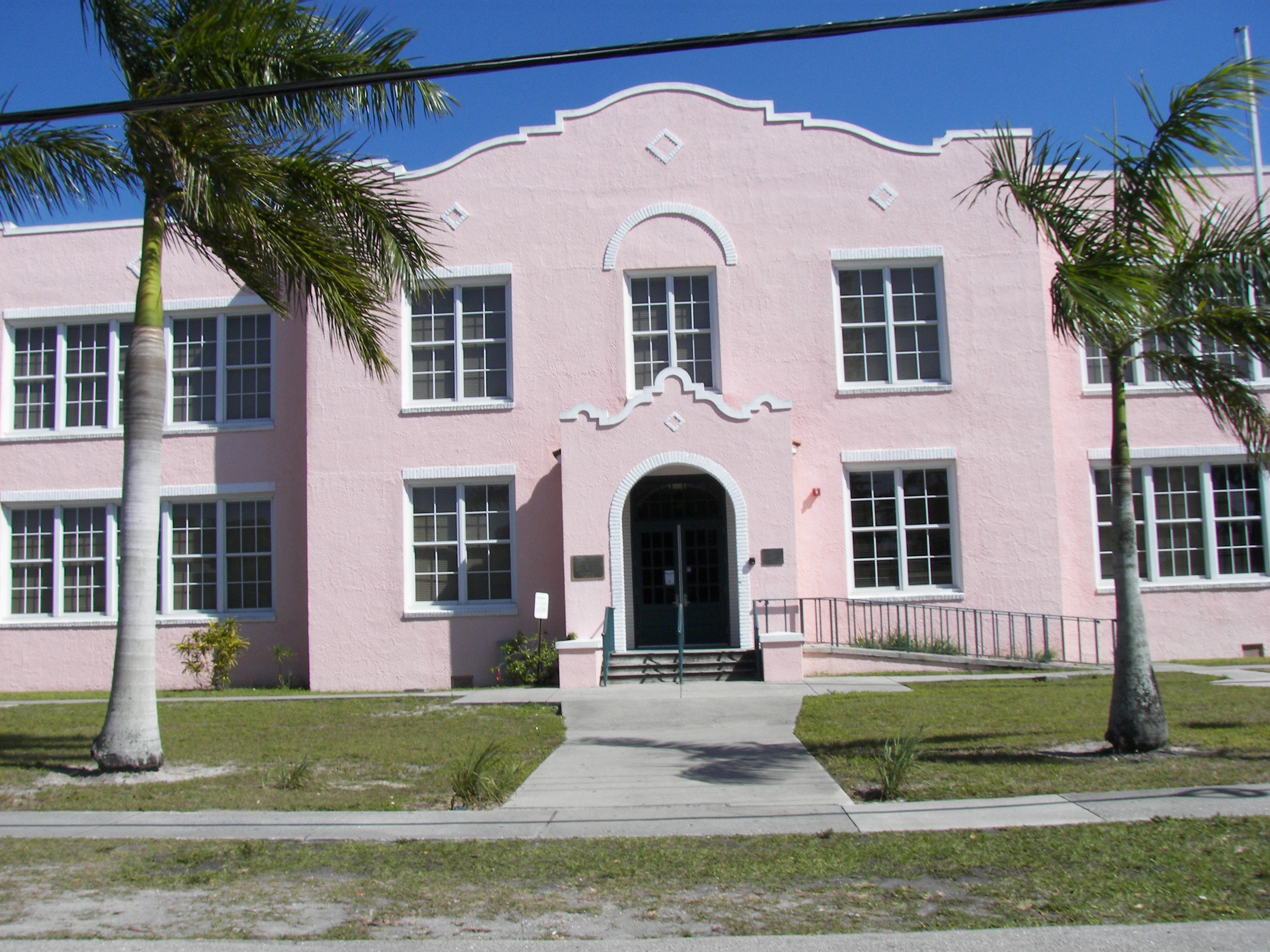
- Location: Fort Myers, Florida
- Coordinates: 26°38′36″N 81°51′7″W
- NRHP reference No.: 92000025
- Added to NRHP: February 24, 1992

The Paul Laurence Dunbar School (also known as the Dunbar Community School) is a historic school in Fort Myers, Florida. It is located at 1857 High Street. On February 24, 1992, it was added to the U.S. National Register of Historic Places.

It opened in 1927 succeeding Williams Academy and served the African American community in the Dunbar neighborhood. James Robert Dixon was its first principal. In 1963 Dunbar High School was built a mile away.

== See also ==
- National Register of Historic Places listings in Lee County, Florida
