= Bonita Springs High School =

Public school in Bonita Springs, Florida, United States

Location
- 25592 Imperial Pkwy; Bonita Springs 34135; United States
- 26.3652°N 81.7693°W

Information
- Type: Public secondary
- Established: 2018
- School district: Lee County School District
- Principal: Jeffrey Estes Jr.
- Teaching staff: 54.70 (FTE)
- Grades: 9-12
- Enrollment: 1,528 (2023-2024)
- Student to teacher ratio: 27.93
- Campus: Rural
- Color
- Mascot: Bull shark
- Website: Bonita Springs High School

Bonita Springs High School is a public school in Bonita Springs, Florida, United States. There were 1,543 students attending it in 2023. The current principal is Jeffrey Estes Jr., who joined the BSHS staff, serving as the school's first principal after leaving the assistant principal position at East Lee County High School. It is managed by the Lee County School District.

== History ==
Bonita Springs High School (BSHS) opened its doors in 2018 as part of the Lee County School District, becoming the city of Bonita Springs' first high school since its incorporation in 1999. The school's construction was driven by the growing population of Bonita Springs and the need to alleviate crowding in existing high schools. The new school offered additional capacity for students in the region and aimed to provide a modern learning environment for the community.

== Administration ==
- Principal: Jeffery Estes Jr.

== Demographics ==
As of the 2022–2023 school year, the total student enrollment was 1,543. The ethnic makeup of the school was 1.6% Black, 37.8% White, 56.2% Hispanic, 2.5% Asian, >0.1% Pacific Islander, 1.9% Multiracial, and >0.1% Native American or Native Alaskan.

== Athletics ==
Bonita Springs High School offers a variety of athletic programs for students during the fall, winter, and spring.

=== Fall ===
Bowling, Cheerleading, Cross Country, Football, Golf, Swimming, Volleyball.

=== Winter ===
Basketball, Competitive Cheerleading, Soccer, Weightlifting - Girls, Wrestling.

=== Spring ===
Baseball, Beach Volleyball, Softball, Tennis, Track & Field, Weightlifting - Boys.
