= Ida S. Baker High School =

Public high school in Cape Coral, Florida, United States

Ida S Baker High School

Location
- 3500 Agualinda Boulevard 33914; Cape Coral, Florida; United States

Information
- Type: Public Secondary
- Established: 2004
- School district: Lee County School District
- Principal: Jami Covert
- Staff: 78.75 (on FTE basis)
- Grades: 9–12
- Enrollment: 2,116 (2023-2024)
- Student to teacher ratio: 26.87
- Campus: Suburb
- Colors: Black, Blue, and Gray
- Mascot: Bruiser the Bulldog
- Website: https://ibh.leeschools.net/

Ida S. Baker High School is a public high school located in Cape Coral, Florida. The school was founded in 2004, and is one of six high schools located in Cape Coral. For the 2011–12 school year it was rated as an "A+" school in the State of Florida.

== History ==
Ida S. Baker High School is named after Ida S. Baker, Lee County's first black principal and the first black Deputy Superintendent in the Florida Department of Education. She became Cape Coral High School's first principal in 1977 and became a Deputy Superintendent at the Florida Department of Education in 1986. After her death in 1992, The Ida S. Baker Distinguished Minority Educator Award was created in her honor, a statewide award for educators who have made contributions for, or have heavily met the needs of, minority students.

== Classes available ==
ART

- Ceramics/Pottery 1, 2, 3
- Draw/Paint 1, 2, 3
- Portfolio 1, 2, 3"
- AP Studio Art 2D

BUILDING

- Building Construction Technology 1, 2, 3
- Drafting 1, 2, 3

BUSINESS, FINANCE, AND INFORMATION TECHNOLOGY

- Accounting Applications 1
- Computing for College and Careers (Grade 9 only)
- PC Support 1,2,3,4
- Business Cooperative Education (OTJ)
- Technical Support and Networking
- Intro to Marketing
- Intro to Finance and Business Technology
- Financial Operations
- Computing for College and Careers (Grade 9 only)
- Introduction to Information Technology
- Programming and Database
- Web/Digital Media
- Digital Design 1, 2, 3, 4
- Sports, Recreation, and Entertainment Marketing Essentials
- Sports, Recreation, and Entertainment Marketing Applications
- Sports, Recreation, and Entertainment Marketing Management
- Marketing Education Directed Study
- Exploration of Career and Technology
- CAREER RESEARCH
- Critical Thinking and Study Skills

JOURNALISM

- Journalism 1, 2, 3, 4
- Creative Writing 1, 2, 3, 4
- Intro to TV Production
- Intro to Journalism
- Industrial Communications
- TV Production 1, 2, 3, 4, 5

CRIMINAL JUSTICE

- Exploration of Public Service Occupations
- Criminal Justice 1, 2, 3

"DRAMA"

- Drama 1, 2, 3

DRIVER'S EDUCATION

- Driver's Education

ENGINEERING AND MANUFACTURING

- Automotive Service 1, 2, 3
- Engineering Assisting 1, 2, 3

SPANISH/LANGUAGE ARTS

- English 1, 2, 3, 4
- Honors English 1, 2, 3, 4
- AP English- Language and Comp. (Grade 11 Only)
- AP English- Literature and Comp (Grade 12 Only)

FIREFIGHTING

- Firefighting 1, 2, 3

FOREIGN LANGUAGE

- Spanish 1, 2, 3, 4
- AP Spanish Language
- Am. Sign Language 1, 2, 3

WELLNESS

- Health Opportunities through Physical Education (H.O.P.E.)

INTENSIVE READING

- Intensive Reading

MATHEMATICS

- Algebra 1, 2
- Honors Algebra 1, 2
- Intensive Math
- Analysis of Function
- Calculus
- Mathematics for College Readiness
- AP Calculus AB
- AP Calculus BC
- Pre-Calculus
- Geometry
- Geometry Honors
- Liberal Arts Math
- AP Statistics

MEDICAL

- Adv. Health Exploration
- Health Science 1, 2
- Allied Health Assisting 3
- Nursing Assisting 3

MUSIC

- Music Theory 1, 2
- Musical Theatre 1, 2, 3
- Guitar 1, 2
- Sound Engineering 1/2
- Band 1, 2, 3, 4
- Orchestra 1, 2, 3, 4
- Instrumental Ensemble 1 (Percussion), 2, 3, 4
- Jazz Ensemble 1, 2, 3, 4 (Audition Only for 1-4)
- Chorus 1, 2, 3, 4
- Eurthymics 1 (Colorguard), 2, 3, 4

PE

- Weight Training: Beginning, Intermediate, Advanced
- Recreational Activities
- Aerobics: Beginning, Intermediate
- Track and Field
- Basketball
- Team Sports 1, 2
- Volleyball: Beginning, Intermediate

ROTC-MILITARY SCIENCE

- Leadership Education 1, 2, 3, 4

SCIENCE

- Biology 1
- Biology 1 Honors
- AP Biology/ Biology 2
- Anatomy Physiology Honors
- Environmental Science
- Astronomy Solar/ Galactic
- AP Environmental Science
- Integrated Science 1
- Integrated Science 1 Honors
- Marine Science
- Marine Science Honors
- Chemistry 1
- Chemistry 1 Honors
- AP Chemistry / Chemistry II
- Physics 1
- Physics 1 Honors
- AP Physics B / Physics II
- Zoology

SOCIAL STUDIES

- Am. History
- Am. History Honors
- AP Am. History
- Economics
- Economics Honors
- AP Macroeconomics
- AP Human Geography
- Am. Government
- Am. Government Honors
- AP Am. Government
- World History
- World History Honors
- AP World History
- Contemporary History
- Comparative Political Systems
- Psychology 1, 2, AP

TEACHING

- Intro to Education
- Teaching Assisting 2, 3, 4
