= Bonita Springs School =

- U.S. National Register of Historic Places
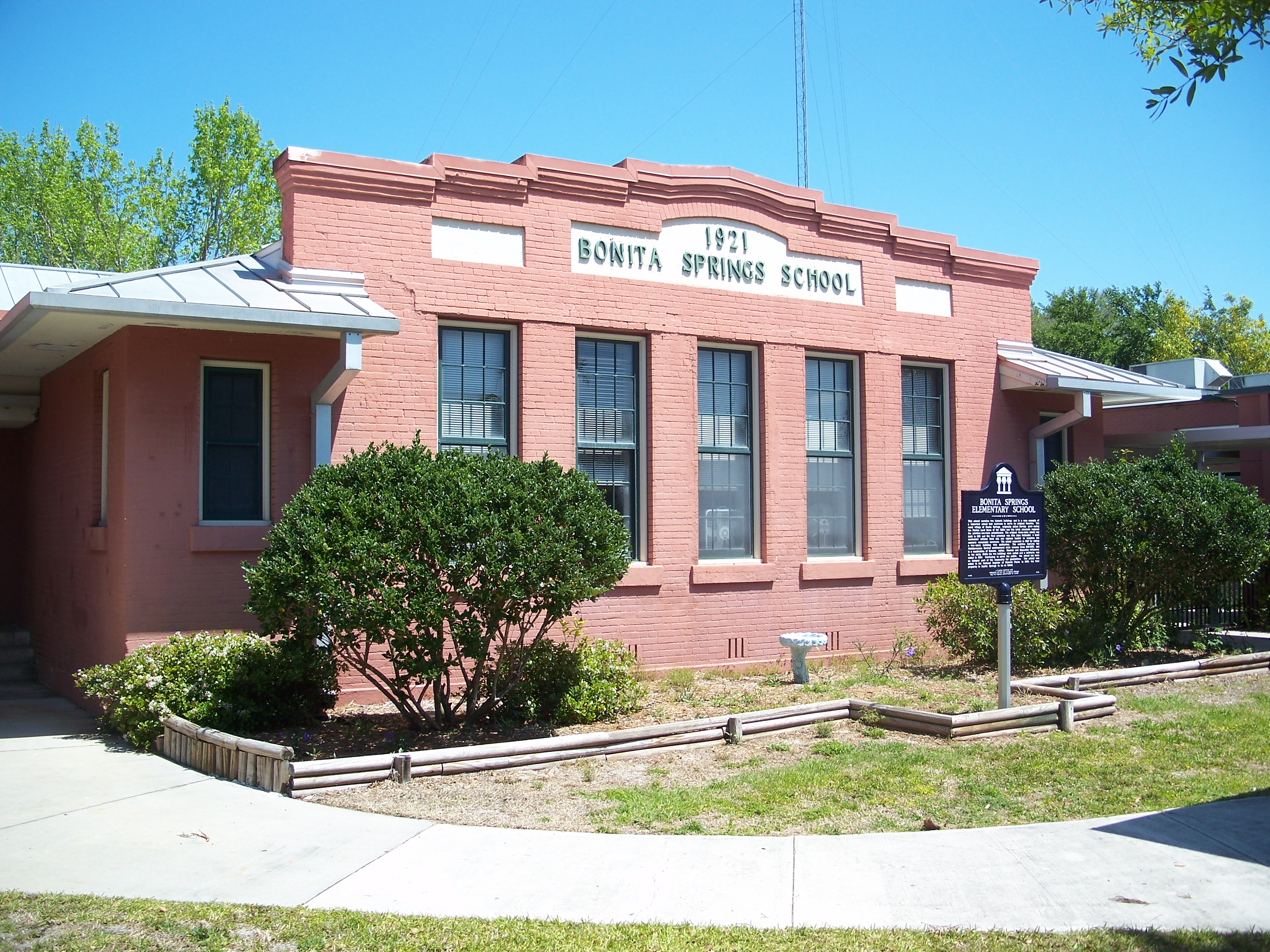

- Location within Florida Location within the United States
- Location: Bonita Springs, Florida
- Coordinates: 26°20′5″N 81°46′31″W
- Architectural style: Mission/Spanish Revival
- MPS: Lee County Multiple Property Submission
- NRHP reference No.: 99000800
- Added to NRHP: July 8, 1999

The Bonita Springs School (also known as the Bonita Springs Elementary School) is a historic school in Bonita Springs, Florida. It is located at 10701 Dean Street. The property is part of the Lee County Multiple Property Submission, a Multiple Property Submission to the National Register.

== History ==
The Bonita Springs School consists of two buildings built in 1921 and 1927. The 1921 building is a masonry vernacular structure, while the 1927 unit features elements of the Mediterranean Revival style. The two buildings were joined in the 1940s with a short brick connector joining the main halls of the two school buildings.

On July 8, 1999, it was added to the U.S. National Register of Historic Places. As of 2025, it still operates as a public school, commonly known as Bonita Springs Elementary School.

== Demolition controversy ==
In 2024, the School District of Lee County, which owns Bonita Springs School, announced plans to demolish the school and rebuild it. The school district stated they could not allocate an additional $10 million needed to preserve the facade of this building. These plans proved controversial when the Bonita Springs City Council and the Bonita Springs Historical Society raised objections and community members launched a petition in protest of the plans. Despite objections, the school district insists that the project is needed for safety reasons.
