= Bonita Springs, Florida =

- City
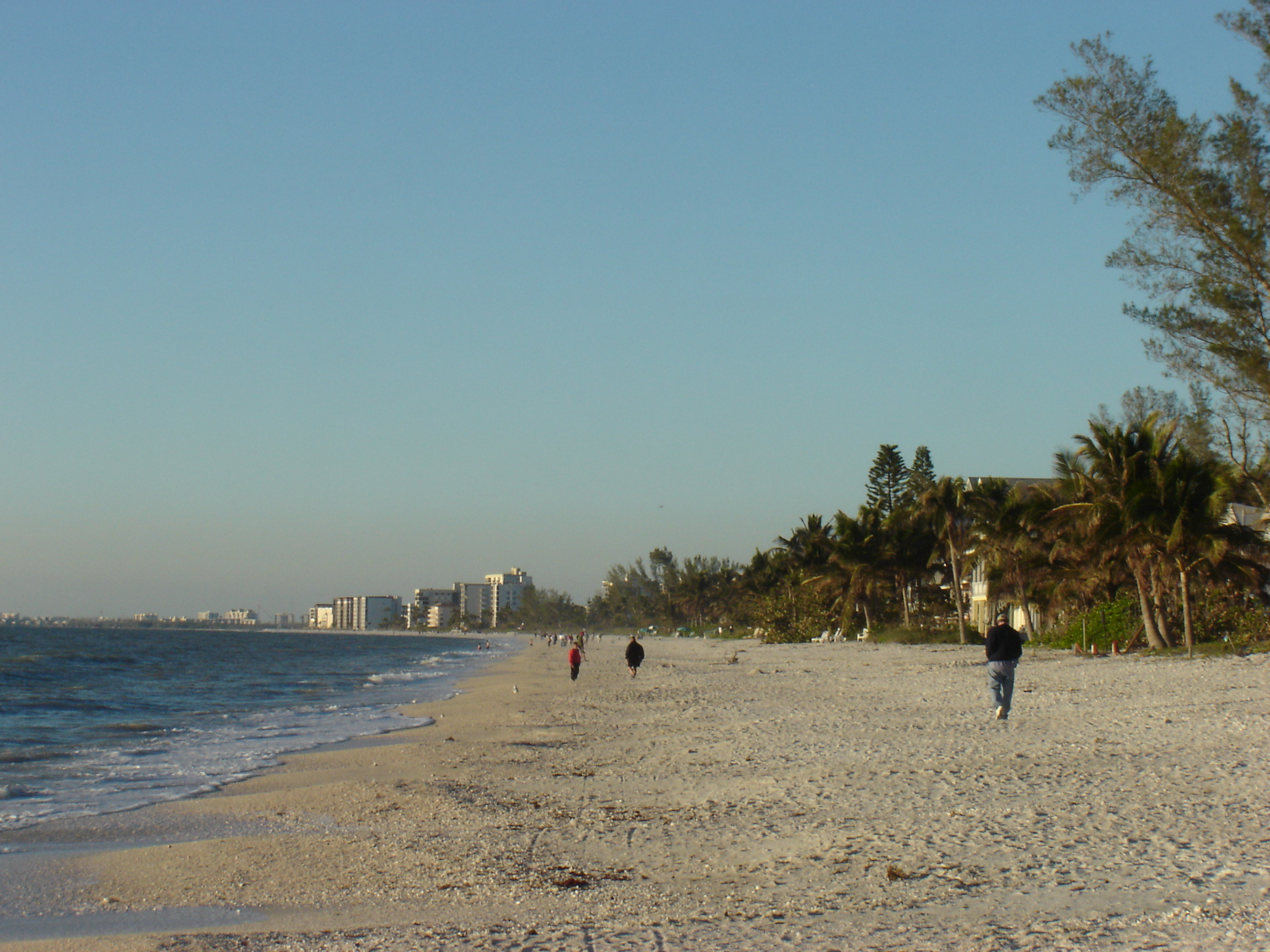
- Bonita Beach

- Seal
- Etymology: Spanish: bonita (beautiful), English: beautiful springs
- Nickname: Gateway to the Gulf
- Motto: "Small Town Charm, Big Bright Future"
- Location in Lee County and the U.S. state of Florida
- Coordinates: 26°22′15″N 81°47′27″W
- Country: United States
- State: Florida
- County: Lee
- Settled (Town of Survey): Late 1800s-1912
- Incorporated (city): 1925-1932
- Reincorporated (city): December 31, 1999

Government
  - Type: Council-Manager
  - Mayor: Mike Gibson (term ends in 2028)
  - Councilors: Jamie Bogacz, Jesse Purdon, Laura Carr, Chris Corrie, Nigel P. Fullick, and Fred Forbes
  - City Manager: Arleen Hunter
  - City Clerk: Mike Sheffield
  - City Attorney: Derek Rooney

Area
  - City: 46.51 sq mi (120.47 km^{2})
  - Land: 38.42 sq mi (99.50 km^{2})
  - Water: 8.09 sq mi (20.96 km^{2}) 13.95%
- Elevation: 10 ft (3.0 m)

Population (2020)
  - City: 53,644
  - Density: 1,396.3/sq mi (539.12/km^{2})
  - Urban: 425,675 (US: 97th)
  - Urban density: 1,752/sq mi (676.5/km^{2})
- Time zone: UTC-5 (Eastern (EST))
  - Summer (DST): UTC-4 (EDT)
- ZIP codes: 34133-34136
- Area code: 239
- FIPS code: 12-07525
- GNIS feature ID: 2403893
- Website: www.cityofbonitasprings.org

Bonita Springs is a city in Lee County, Florida, United States. The population was 53,644 at the 2020 census, up from 43,914 at the 2010 census. It is part of the Cape Coral-Fort Myers, Florida Metropolitan Statistical Area, on the state's southwest coast.

== History ==
Bonita Springs' history dates back approximately 8,000 years, with evidence of early inhabitants including the Calusa Indians. In the 1870s, the US Army Corps of Engineers surveyed the area, establishing a camp along what is now the Imperial River. This site became known as Survey, and the river was called Surveyor's Creek.

In the 1880s, Braxton Comer bought 6,000 acres around Survey and brought indentured families to work on his plantation. By the early 20th century, developers decided to rename the area Bonita Springs to make it more appealing to settlers and investors. By 1912, streets and avenues were laid out, and the names Survey and Surveyor's Creek were changed to Bonita Springs and the Imperial River, respectively.

The completion of a road to Fort Myers in 1917 and the extension of the Atlantic Coast Line Railroad's Fort Myers Southern Branch through Bonita Springs to Marco Island in the 1920s spurred significant growth. The Tamiami Trail, completed in 1928, further contributed to this development. During this time, Bonita Springs experienced a land boom, leading to the establishment of citrus groves and various tourist attractions, including the Everglades Wonder Gardens and the Shell Factory.

The advent of air conditioning, the construction of Interstate 75, and the opening of Southwest Florida International Airport in the late 20th century brought more tourists and retirees to Bonita Springs. Today, it is known for its beaches and luxury golf courses, attracting both residents and businesses.

== Geography ==
According to the United States Census Bureau, the city has an area of 41.0 square miles (106 km^{2}), of which 35.3 square miles (91 km^{2}) is land and 5.7 square miles (15 km^{2}) (13.95%) is water.

The city is on both Estero Bay and the Gulf of Mexico. The area called Bonita Beach is on Little Hickory Island, a road-accessible barrier island that lies between the Gulf of Mexico and Estero Bay. The Imperial River flows through the city's downtown district and empties into Estero Bay.

=== Climate ===
The city lies in the tropical climate zone, more specifically a tropical monsoon climate (Köppen climate classification: Am), having a mean January temperature of 65 °F (18 °C).

Climate data for Bonita Springs
Month	Jan	Feb	Mar	Apr	May	Jun	Jul	Aug	Sep	Oct	Nov	Dec	Year
Mean daily maximum °F (°C)	71.6 (22.0)	74.1 (23.4)	77.2 (25.1)	81.0 (27.2)	84.7 (29.3)	86.4 (30.2)	87.1 (30.6)	87.6 (30.9)	86.4 (30.2)	83.8 (28.8)	78.6 (25.9)	74.7 (23.7)	81.1 (27.3)
Daily mean °F (°C)	64.8 (18.2)	67.5 (19.7)	70.5 (21.4)	74.7 (23.7)	78.6 (25.9)	81.1 (27.3)	82.0 (27.8)	82.4 (28.0)	81.1 (27.3)	77.9 (25.5)	72.1 (22.3)	68.4 (20.2)	75.1 (23.9)
Mean daily minimum °F (°C)	58.3 (14.6)	61.3 (16.3)	64.2 (17.9)	68.7 (20.4)	73.0 (22.8)	77.0 (25.0)	78.3 (25.7)	78.6 (25.9)	77.2 (25.1)	73.0 (22.8)	66.2 (19.0)	62.2 (16.8)	69.8 (21.0)
Average precipitation inches (mm)	0.57 (14)	0.56 (14)	0.62 (16)	0.93 (24)	1.15 (29)	2.71 (69)	4.03 (102)	3.85 (98)	2.94 (75)	1.56 (40)	0.66 (17)	0.61 (15)	20.19 (513)
Source: Weather.Directory

Hurricane Charley made landfall north of Bonita Springs on August 13, 2004. Hurricane Wilma made landfall south of Bonita Springs on October 24, 2005. On September 9–10, 2017, Hurricane Irma, at the time a slow-moving Category 3 storm, passed over Florida's southwest coast. The eyewall/eye passed overhead in Bonita Springs. Many structures were damaged or destroyed and the city experienced significant flooding.

== Demographics ==
Historical population
Census	Pop.	Note	%±
1940	356		—
1970	1,932		—
1980	5,435		181.3%
1990	13,600		150.2%
2000	32,797		141.2%
2010	43,914		33.9%
2020	53,644		22.2%

=== Racial and ethnic composition ===
Bonita Springs racial composition (Hispanics excluded from racial categories) (NH = Non-Hispanic)
Race	Pop 2010	Pop 2020	% 2010	% 2020
White (NH)	32,980	39,703	75.10%	74.01%
Black or African American (NH)	289	470	0.66%	0.88%
Native American or Alaska Native (NH)	58	53	0.13%	0.09%
Asian (NH)	433	754	0.99%	1.41%
Pacific Islander or Native Hawaiian (NH)	14	30	0.03%	0.06%
Some other race (NH)	36	199	0.08%	0.37%
Two or more races/Multiracial (NH)	227	1,063	0.52%	1.98%
Hispanic or Latino (any race)	9,877	11,372	22.49%	21.20%
Total	43,914	53,644	100.00%	100.00%

=== 2020 census ===
As of the 2020 census, Bonita Springs had a population of 53,644. The median age was 61.9 years. 11.7% of residents were under the age of 18 and 44.2% of residents were 65 years of age or older. For every 100 females there were 96.7 males, and for every 100 females age 18 and over there were 95.4 males age 18 and over.

99.6% of residents lived in urban areas, while 0.4% lived in rural areas.

There were 24,894 households in Bonita Springs, of which 13.4% had children under the age of 18 living in them. Of all households, 57.0% were married-couple households, 15.0% were households with a male householder and no spouse or partner present, and 22.3% were households with a female householder and no spouse or partner present. About 26.9% of all households were made up of individuals and 17.4% had someone living alone who was 65 years of age or older.

There were 38,577 housing units, of which 35.5% were vacant. The homeowner vacancy rate was 2.7% and the rental vacancy rate was 18.8%.

There were 16,267 families in the city.

=== 2010 census ===
As of the 2010 United States census, there were 43,914 people, 19,137 households, and 12,917 families residing in the city.

=== 2000 census ===
The 2009 estimated median income for a household in the city was $53,452, and the median income for a family was $53,436. Males had a median income of $31,227 versus $25,358 for females. The per capita income for the city was $37,958. About 6.2% of families and 10% of the population were below the poverty line, including 20.2% of those under age 18 and 5.2% of those aged 65 or over.

In 2009, 16.7% of households had children under the age of 18 living with them, 61.2% were married couples living together, 4.1% had a female householder with no husband present, and 32.5% were non-families. 27.1% of all households were made up of individuals, and 11.6% had someone living alone who was 65 years of age or older. The average household size was 2.15 and the average family size was 2.55.

As of 2000, the population density was 929.4 inhabitants per square mile (358.8/km^{2}). There were 31,716 housing units at an average density of 661.1 per square mile (255.3/km^{2}).

In 2000, 13.9% of residents were under the age of 18, 5.9% from 18 to 24, 19.8% from 25 to 44, 28.8% from 45 to 64, and 31.7% were 65 years of age or older. The median age was 54 years. For every 100 females, there were 104.6 males. For every 100 females aged 18 and over, there were 103.9 males.

== Arts and culture ==
Bonita Springs has institutions like the Centers for the Arts Bonita Springs, which offers art classes, exhibitions, and performances. The city hosts several annual events, including the Celebrate Bonita festival and various arts and craft fairs.

The Bonita Springs Historical Society offers walking tours that highlight the city’s historic sites, including the Liles Hotel and the Bonita Springs Elementary School. These tours offer insights into the area's history and its evolution over time.

Public art is an integral part of the city's cultural landscape, with numerous sculptures and murals adorning public spaces. The Everglades Wonder Gardens, a historic attraction, continues to draw visitors with its botanical garden and wildlife exhibits.

== Education ==
Bonita Springs is served by the Lee County School District.

=== Elementary schools ===
- Bonita Springs Elementary School
- Spring Creek Elementary School

=== Middle school ===
- Bonita Springs Middle School

=== High school ===
- Bonita Springs High School

=== Charter schools ===
- Bonita Springs Charter School
- Oak Creek Charter School

=== Private schools ===
- Bonita Springs Preparatory School
- Royal Palm Academy Catholic School
- Discovery Day Academy Private School

=== Higher learning ===
- Florida Institute of Music

== Transportation ==
=== Airports ===
- Southwest Florida International Airport in nearby South Fort Myers serves over 8 million passengers annually.
- Naples Municipal Airport in Naples is a smaller airport primarily for private aviation

=== Major highways ===
- Interstate 75
- U.S. Route 41 "South Tamiami Trail"
- (County Road 865) Bonita Beach Road / Hickory Boulevard

=== Mass transportation ===
Fixed-route bus and trolley service is provided by the Lee County Transit Department, operated as LeeTran.

=== Rail ===
Seminole Gulf Railway owns and operates a line that passes through the city. The company offers freight service and local, daytime excursions.

== Media ==
=== Newspapers ===
Bonita Springs is served by local editions of the Fort Myers News-Press and Naples Daily News.

=== Radio ===
The metropolitan area is home to 36 radio stations. With an Arbitron-assigned 879,600 listening area population, the metropolitan area of which Bonita Springs is one part ranks 61/274 for the fall of 2013. Arbitron Standard Radio Market: Ft. Myers-Naples-Marco Island.

=== Television ===
Nielsen Media Research designated market area: Ft. Myers-Naples.

2013 - 2014 estimate U.S. rank: 62/210 (517,920 TV Homes)

- WBBH – NBC affiliate
- WFTX – Fox affiliate
- WGCU – PBS member station
- WINK – CBS affiliate
- WXCW – CW affiliate
- WZVN – ABC affiliate
- BTV 98 – Government-access television operated by the city of Bonita Springs

== Points of interest ==
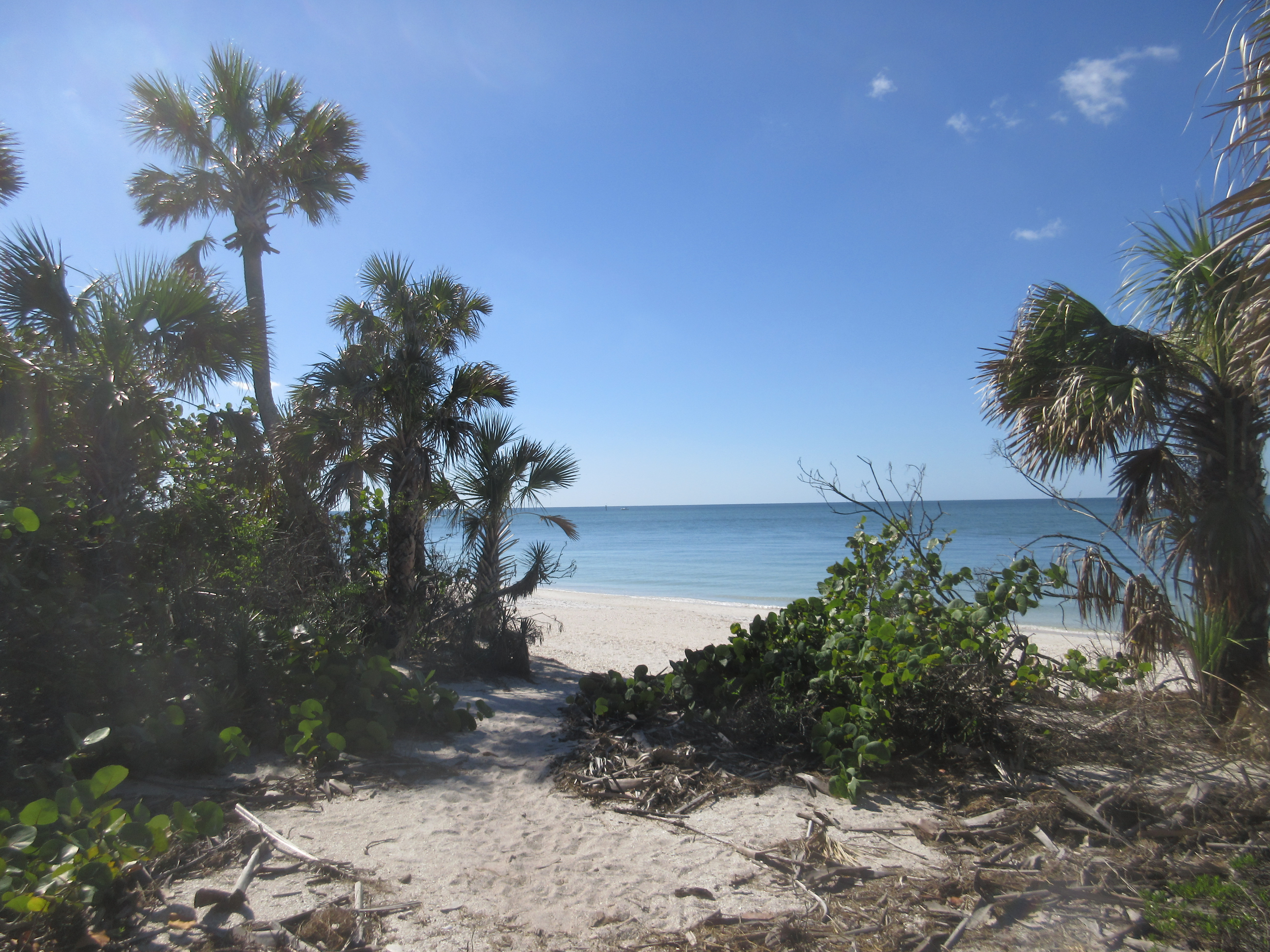
Barefoot Beach, a former recipient of a top beach award, is located within the community.

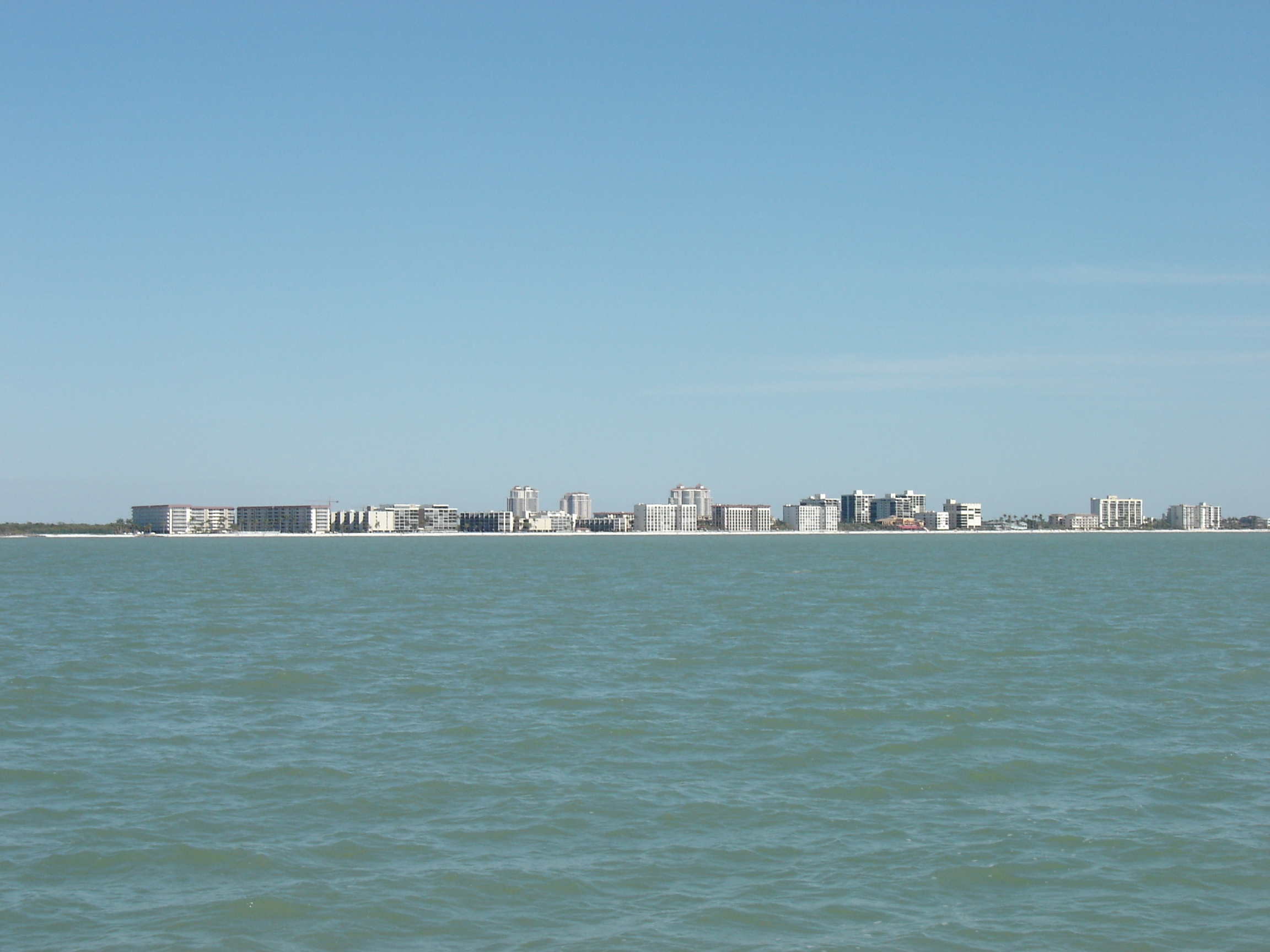
Bonita Beach, as seen from the Gulf of Mexico

- Barefoot Beach Preserve Park, a 342-acre (1.38 km^{2}) park on the border of Collier and Lee Counties. In 2013, Forbes ranked the park's beach the sixth-best in the country.
- Bonita Beach Park, a 2.5-acre (10,000 m^{2}) beachfront park with a boardwalk and swimming area
- Center for the Arts of Bonita Springs, an arts organization that hosts local, regional, and national traveling art exhibitions. The organization has two campuses, the 10-acre Center for Visual Arts with galleries, studios, classrooms, art library, and offices; and 1.8 miles south, the four-acre Center for Performing Arts, which has two auditoriums, a black box theater, a film center, music rooms, and studios for study of performing arts. The organization's Bonita Springs Art Festivals are held January, February, and March in downtown Bonita Springs.
- Corkscrew Swamp Sanctuary, a bald cypress reserve under management of the National Audubon Society
- Bonita Spring's Wonder Gardens features a large collection of Florida wildlife, including exotic birds, alligators, and flamingos. It opened in 1936 as both a wildlife exhibition and a refuge for injured animals and has a botanical garden and a natural history museum.
- Little Hickory Island Beach Park
- Lover's Key State Park, a 1,616-acre (6.54 km^{2}) park made up of four barrier islands, is within the city, just north of Bonita Beach. It has nature trails for hiking and bicycling, a canoe launch, kayak and canoe rentals, acres of unspoiled mangroves and miles of pristine beaches. A haven for wildlife, the islands and their waters are home to West Indian manatees, bottlenose dolphins, roseate spoonbills, marsh rabbits and bald eagles.
- There are also 10 beach accesses with public parking up and down Bonita Beach.
- Everglades Wonder Gardens, established in 1936, is a historic botanical garden and wildlife sanctuary. Originally created as a roadside attraction, it features a variety of exotic and native plants, as well as wildlife exhibits. The gardens have become an integral part of Bonita Springs' history and culture, providing educational and recreational opportunities for visitors.

== Sister cities ==
- Gruenstadt, Germany
- Isla Mujeres, Quintana Roo, Mexico

== Notable person ==
- Glenn Steil Sr., member of the Michigan Senate
