= Williams Academy =

School in Florida

Coordinates: 26.6417°N 81.8584°W

Williams Academy was a school for African Americans in Fort Myers, Florida serving African American students in Lee County, Florida. The Williams Academy Black History Museum commemorates its history and is housed the 1942 addition to the original 1913 school building, which was saved from demolition and moved to Roberto Celemente Park. Williams Academy was succeeded in 1927 by Dunbar Community School.
