= LeeTran =

- Founded: 1974
- Locale: Fort Myers, Florida
- Service area: Lee County, Florida
- Service type: Bus service, paratransit
- Daily ridership: 5,300 (weekdays, Q2 2025)
- Annual ridership: 1,831,800 (2024)
- Website: leegov.com/leetran

LeeTran is the transit bus service operated by the Lee County Transit Department, providing service to Bonita Springs, Cape Coral, Fort Myers, Fort Myers Beach and much of the unincorporated area of Lee County, Florida. Buses operate Monday through Saturday between 5:00 a.m. and 9:45 p.m., depending on the route; and at various times on Sunday. Trolleys operate Monday through Sunday between 6:30 a.m. and 9:25 p.m.. In 2024, the system had a ridership of 1,831,800, or about 5,300 per weekday as of the second quarter of 2025.

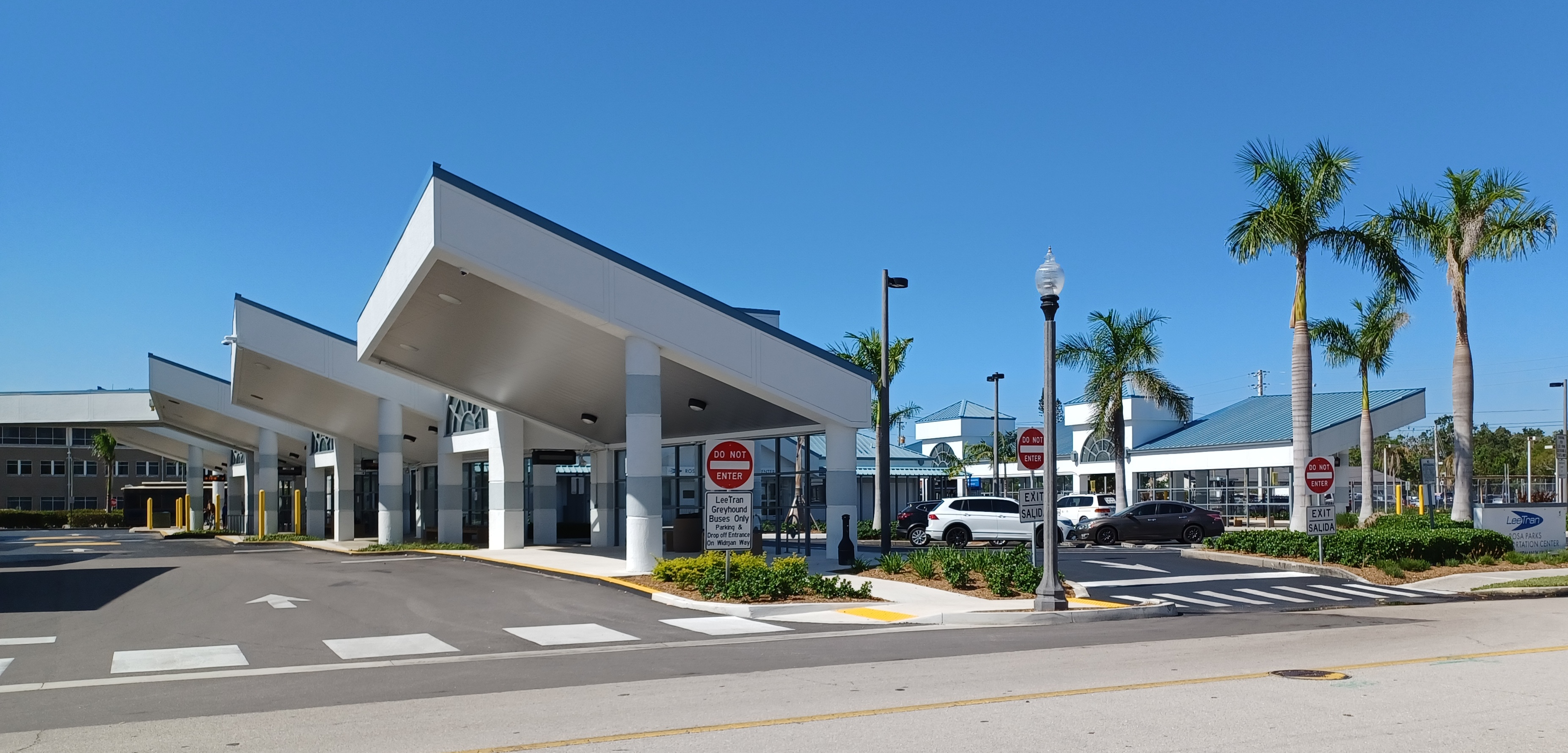
Rosa Parks Transportation Center

== Routes ==
LeeTran serves the following bus routes.

No.	Route	in service
5	Edison Mall to The Forum	Mon – Sat
10	Edison Mall and Dunbar	Mon – Sat
15	Downtown Fort Myers and Tice	Mon – Sun
20	Dunbar and Downtown Fort Myers	Mon – Sat
30	Camelot Isles to Bell Tower Shoppes	Mon – Sat
40	Cape Transfer Center to Coralwood Mall	Mon – Sat
50	SW FL Airport to Beach Park and Ride	Mon – Sun
60	US 41 and Constitution to Gulf Coast Town Center	Mon – Sat
70	Cape Coral and Fort Myers	Mon – Sun
80	Bell Tower Shops to Edison Mall	Mon – Fri
100	Riverdale to Downtown Ft Myers	Mon – Sun
110	Lehigh Acres to Edison Mall	Mon – Sun
120	Edison Mall to Cape Coral Transfer Center	Mon – Sun
130	Edison Mall to Beach Park and Ride	Mon – Sun
140	Merchants Crossing to Bell Tower$	Mon – Sun
240	Bell Tower to Coconut Point Mall$&	Mon – Sat
410	Bowditch Park to Lovers Key State Park	Mon – Sun
490	Beach Park & Ride to Times Square	Mon – Sun
515	Lehigh Circulator, Homestead Plaza to Joel Blvd.	Mon – Sat
590	North Fort Myers, Suncoast Estates Loop	Mon – Sun
595	North Fort Myers, Pondella Loop	Mon – Sun
600	Coconut Point Mall to Creekside Transfer Center&	Mon – Sun

$ Mon-Sat 140 runs Merchants Crossing to Bell Tower, 240 Runs Bell Tower To Coconut Point. On Sundays, 140 runs full route
& Interlined Routes On Monday to Saturday, On Sunday 600 Runs Regular Route No 240 Service

=== Seasonal Routes ===
No.	Route	in service
420	Bowditch Point Park to Ft Myers Beach Library	Mon – Sun
500	River District Trolley	Mon – Sun
505	River District Trolley	Mon – Sun

=== Former Routes ===
No.	Route
150	Bonita Grande to Lovers Key in Bonita Springs
160	Pine Island to Cape Coral
