= Whidden's Marina =

- U.S. National Register of Historic Places
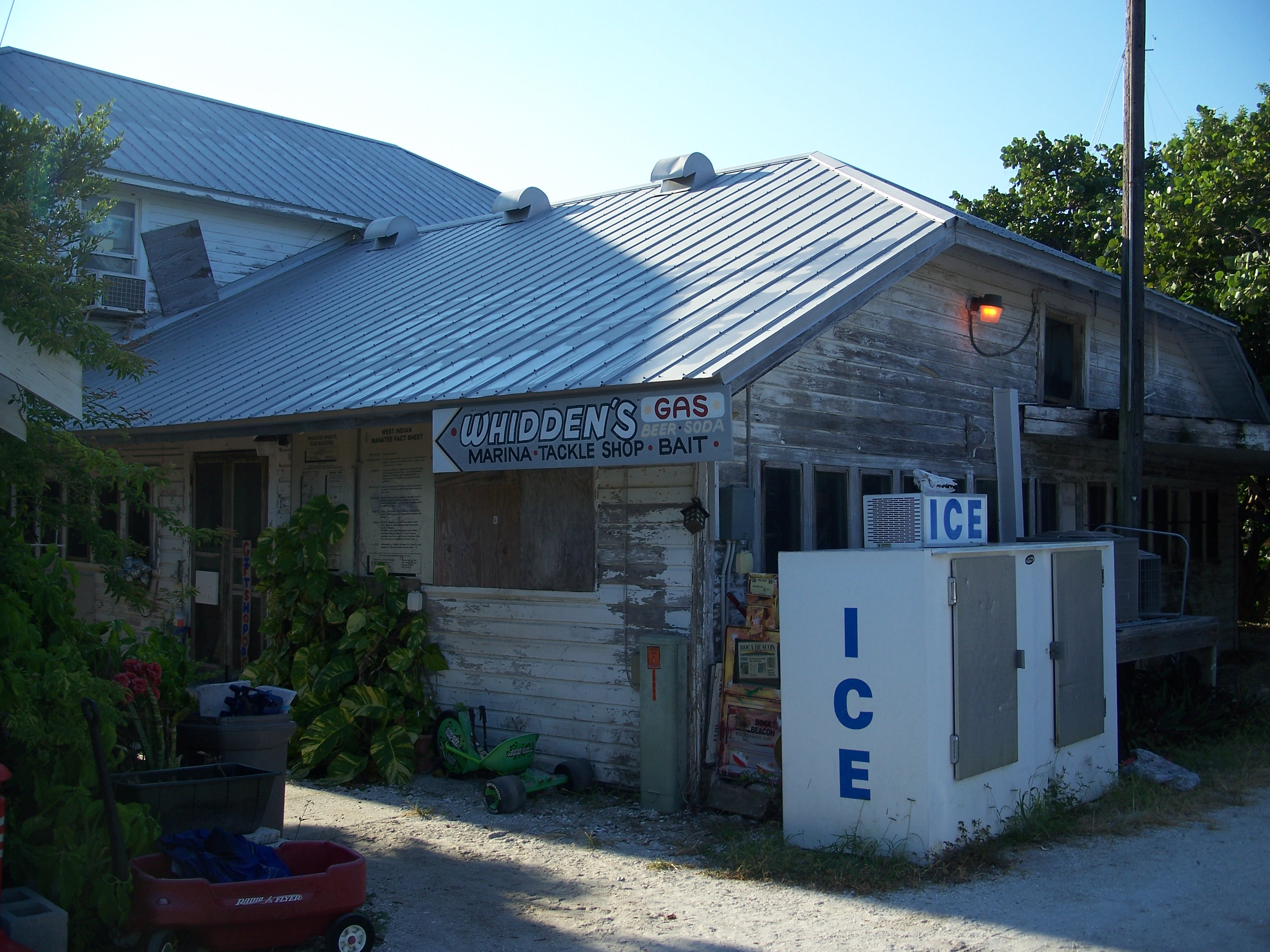

- Location within Florida Location within the United States
- Location: Boca Grande, Florida
- Coordinates: 26°44′44″N 82°15′26″W
- MPS: Lee County Multiple Property Submission
- NRHP reference No.: 00001539
- Added to NRHP: December 28, 2000

Whidden's Marina is a historic marina in Boca Grande, Florida. It is located at 190 1st Street East. On December 28, 2000, it was added to the U.S. National Register of Historic Places.

This property is part of the Lee County Multiple Property Submission, a Multiple Property Submission to the National Register.
