= Boca Grande Community Center =

- U.S. National Register of Historic Places
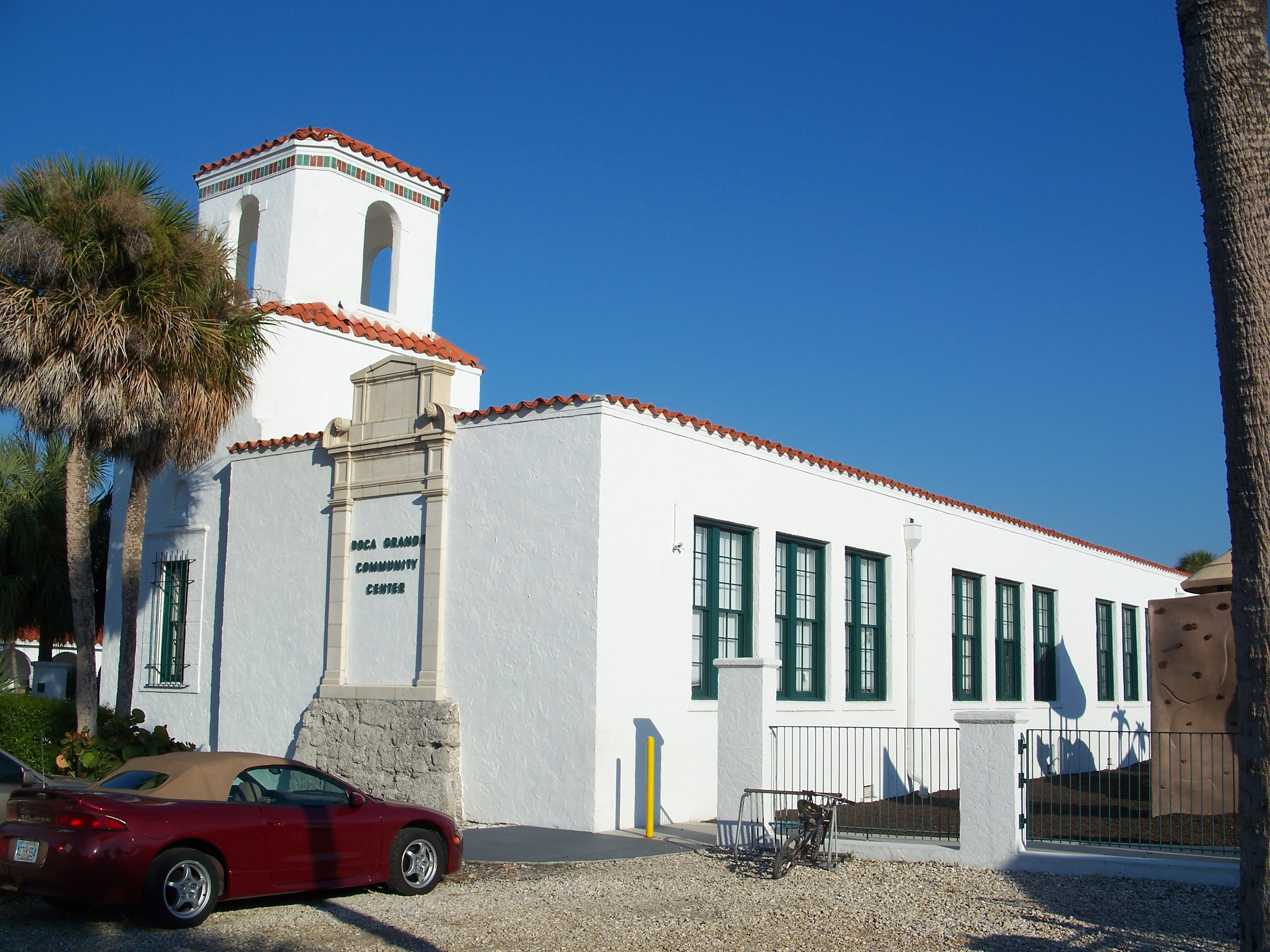

- Location within Florida Location within the United States
- Location: Boca Grande, Florida
- Coordinates: 26°44′48″N 82°15′42″W
- Architectural style: Mission/Spanish Revival
- MPS: Lee County Multiple Property Submission
- NRHP reference No.: 95000306
- Added to NRHP: 30 March 1995

The Boca Grande Community Center (also known as Boca Grande School) is a historic site in Boca Grande, Florida, United States. It is located east of Park Avenue, between 1st and 2nd Streets. On March 30, 1995, it was added to the U.S. National Register of Historic Places.

This property is part of the Lee County Multiple Property Submission, a Multiple Property Submission to the National Register.
