= Fort Myers Beach School =

- U.S. National Register of Historic Places
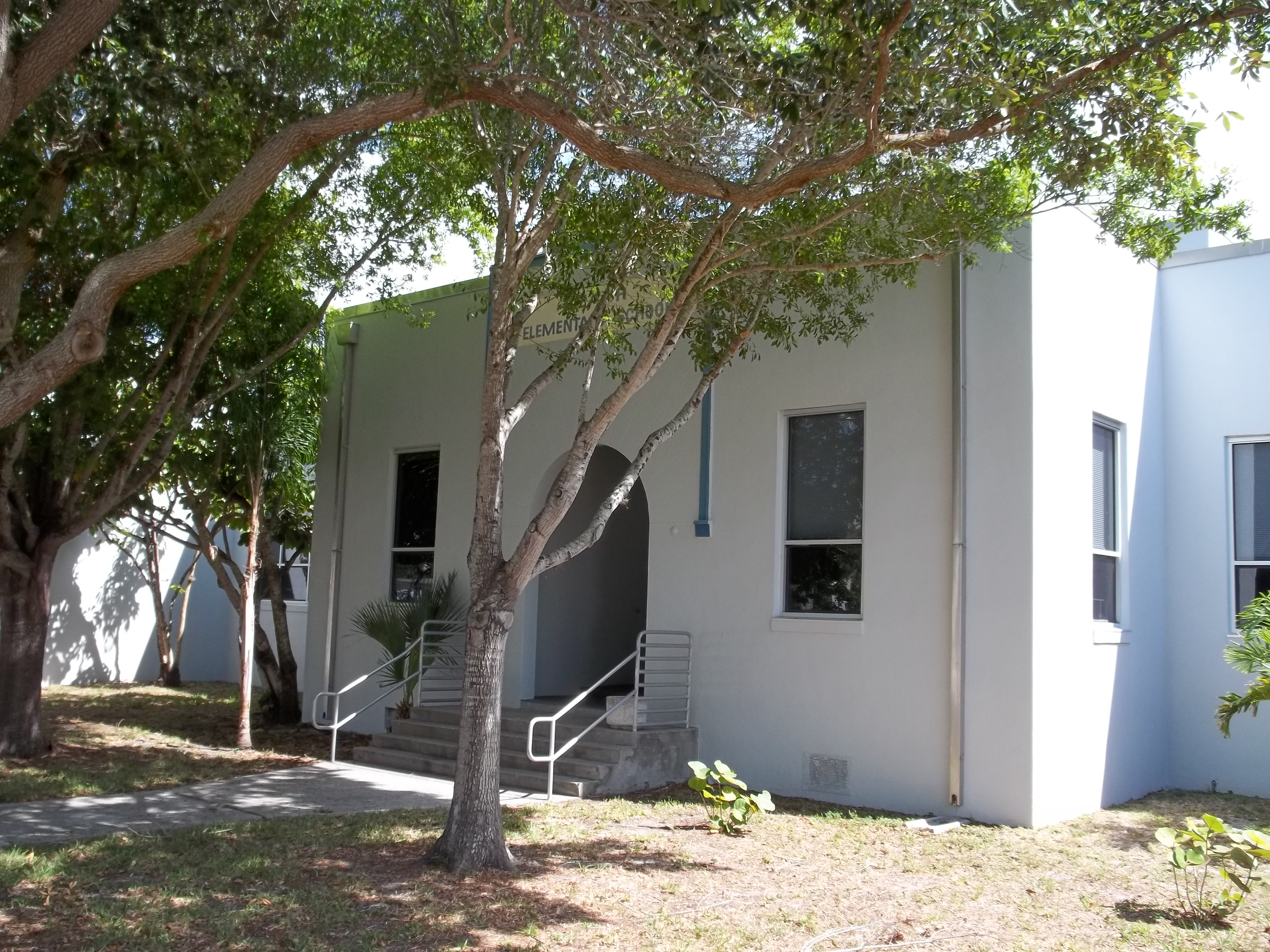

- Location within Florida Location within the United States
- Location: Fort Myers Beach, Florida United States
- Coordinates: 26°26′55″N 81°56′20″W
- Built: 1947
- MPS: Lee County Multiple Property Submission
- NRHP reference No.: 99000796
- Added to NRHP: July 8, 1999

The Fort Myers Beach School (also known as the Fort Myers Beach Elementary School or simply Beach School) is a historic school in Fort Myers Beach, Florida. It is located at 2751 Oak Street. On July 8, 1999, it was added to the U.S. National Register of Historic Places.

This property is part of the Lee County Multiple Property Submission, a Multiple Property Submission to the National Register.

On September 28, 2022 the school was largely destroyed by Hurricane Ian, though the district had expressed interest in trying to save at least part of the structure. In 2023, more recently constructed buildings that were not considered historic and were heavily damaged by Hurricane Ian were demolished and the original historic structure was renovated. It was rebuilt and reopened for the 2023 school year.

In 2024, Hurricane Helene and Hurricane Milton caused significant damage to the structure and exposed its support pillars. After failing an architectural review, it was closed once more.

Its future is still being considered.
