= Alva Consolidated Schools =

- The Alva School
- U.S. National Register of Historic Places
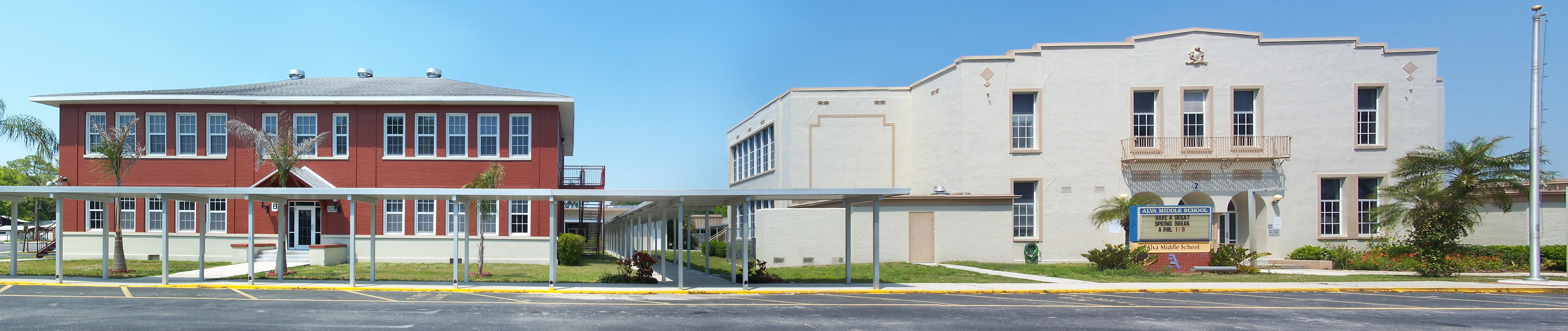

- Location within Florida Location within the United States
- Location: 21291 N River Rd, Alva, Florida
- Coordinates: 26°42′58″N 81°36′36″W
- Built: 1914
- Architect: W.L. Redditt, et al
- Architectural style: Mission/Spanish Revival, Masonry Vernacular
- MPS: Lee County MPS
- NRHP reference No.: 99000695
- Added to NRHP: June 10, 1999

The Alva School (also known as the Alva Elementary and Middle School) is a historic school in Alva, Florida. It is located at 21291 North River Road. On June 10, 1999, it was added to the U.S. National Register of Historic Places.

This property is part of the Lee County Multiple Property Submission, a Multiple Property Submission to the National Register.
