= Dunbar High School (Fort Myers, Florida) =

Coordinates: 26.633759°N 81.834098°W

Location
- 3800 E Edison Ave; Fort Myers, Florida 33916; United States

Information
- Type: Public secondary school
- Established: 1926
- School district: Lee County School District
- Principal: Carl Burnside
- Staff: 80.75 (FTE)
- Grades: 9-12
- Enrollment: 1,762 (2023-2024)
- Student to teacher ratio: 21.82
- Colors: Orange and green
- Mascot: Tigers
- Nickname: Fighting Tigers
- Website: www.dhs.leeschools.net

Dunbar High School is a school located in Fort Myers, Florida. It was established in 1926 and re-established in 2000. This secondary school is home to the Dunbar High School Academy of Technology Excellence and the Dunbar High School Center for Math and Science.

It is the home of the "Fighting Tigers". The school mascot is a tiger and the school colors are orange and green.

The school received an "A" grade for the 2009–2010 school year, along with two other Lee County schools.

== History ==
In 1926, Dunbar High School was constructed as the third public high school in Lee County, on what is now High Street in Fort Myers. It was named for the poet, Paul Laurence Dunbar. The construction of this school, along with the adjacent Williams Primary, provided K-12 educational opportunities for the black children of the area.

This Dunbar High School graduated its last class of students in 1962. This original facility, renamed as the Dunbar Community School, continues to provide services to meet the educational needs of community members young and old.

In 1962, students moved to a new school on Edison Avenue which was named Dunbar Senior High School. Graduates emerged from the halls of this school from 1962 through 1969. In 1969, this school was closed due to changes required by the federal desegregation order, and students were reassigned to the various traditionally white schools. The school would later reopen as Dunbar Middle School.

Notably, the middle school on Edison Avenue changed its name to again honor the poet – it became Paul Laurence Dunbar Middle School. In the fall of 2000, Paul Laurence Dunbar Middle School moved to its new location, on Winkler Avenue Extension, just south of Colonial Boulevard. Also, in the fall of 2000, Dunbar High School was opened - on East Edison Avenue (where the middle school was located).

== The Center for Math and Science ==
The Center for Math and Science's title is usually shortened to just "C.M.S."

CMS is a program that helps Dunbar students exceed in math and science related areas. A separate application is required to be admitted into the center. Registered students have the opportunity to listen to a number of special guest speakers and an optional study period called CMS Research.

The Dunbar High School Center for Math and Science has had success in both the Thomas Alva Edison Kiwanis Science and Engineering Fair and the Florida State Science Olympiad. Recently the Science Olympiad team received first place in the regional competition at FAU.

=== Science Olympiad ===
DHS is also home to a Science Olympiad team.

2006: In the 2006 Florida state competition, Dunbar fielded one team which placed sixth.

2007:In the 2007 competition season, Dunbar fielded two teams in both the regional and state competitions.

On Dunbar's C-15 team, team members Joseph Scofield and Smit Patel placed third in Forensics, and team members Abigail Bryant and Josh Katine placed third in Rocks & Minerals. Dunbar's C-18 team placed first in Remote Sensing with team members Juan Carlos Quijada and Woody Culp. C-15 received 8th Place overall with a total of 240 points. C-18 received Tenth Place overall with a total of 263 points. Notably, Ernest R. Greer achieved third place by himself in a team competition.

2008: In 2008, the Dunbar team competed in the regional competition at FAU. The team received first place overall in this competition.

== The Academy for Technology Excellence ==
In the fall of 2005, Dunbar High School began the Academy for Technology Excellence. Upon completion of the program, students are prepared to excel in a technologically advanced society. The program offers 9th-12th grade students hands-on experiences taught by highly certified instructors. All ATE students have the opportunity to acquire 12 or more recognized industry standard computer certifications in areas associated with information technology.

Students completing any of the component programs will have far greater fluency with technology, with specific productivity software, and with critical thinking skills that embody so much of the technical work that they do. The Academy offers honors weighted credit and dual enrollment credit for many of its courses, plus meets the requirements for the Florida Gold Seal Scholarship. Students exiting these programs will be ready to either advance to the next level of formal education or directly enter the workforce and become a technical specialist, systems engineer, PC support technician, office end-user specialists, web designer, software developer, database administrator, security specialists and many more. In addition, students will have an earning potential ranging from $35,000-$50,000 annually upon successful completion of these certifications.

Upon graduation, students will have all the prerequisite skills and knowledge to choose a career path within the Information Technology (IT). Combined with Dunbar's rigorous Center for Math & Science and AP programs, students who are part of the Academy for Technology Excellence will have a competitive and empowering edge over most college-bound students.

Microsoft In November 2007 recognized Dunbar High School as the nation's first Microsoft Certified High School. Also the week of December 10 Microsoft was at Dunbar High School filming a documentary.

=== Certifications Offered ===
The school offered a complete immersion track of courses that allowed students to have the potential to earn up to 12 industry standard, IT computer certifications. Academy students will have a 2 period block in the Academy technology labs.

Tier One (Year One)

- Information Technology Specialist (Certiport): Device Configuration and Management
- CompTIA IT Fundamentals+
- CompTIA A+ (Essentials & IT Technician)

Tier Two (Year Two)

- Information Technology Specialist (Certiport): Networking
- CompTIA Network+
- CompTIA IT Operations Specialist
- Cisco Certified Network Associate (CCNA)

Tier Three (Year Three)

- Information Technology Specialist (Certiport): Network Security
- CompTIA Server+
- CompTIA Network Infrastructure Professional

Tier Four (Year Four)

- Information Technology Specialist (Certiport): Cybersecurity
- Cisco Certified Support Technician: Cybersecurity
- CompTIA Security+
- CompTIA Secure Infrastructure Specialist

== Athletics ==
In 2011 the girls' basketball team won the FHSAA class 4A state championship.

== Notable alumni ==
Deven Thompkins- NFL Player

Leonard Mustari- 60m Hurdle Under 20 World Record Holder
