= Edison Park Elementary School =

- U.S. National Register of Historic Places
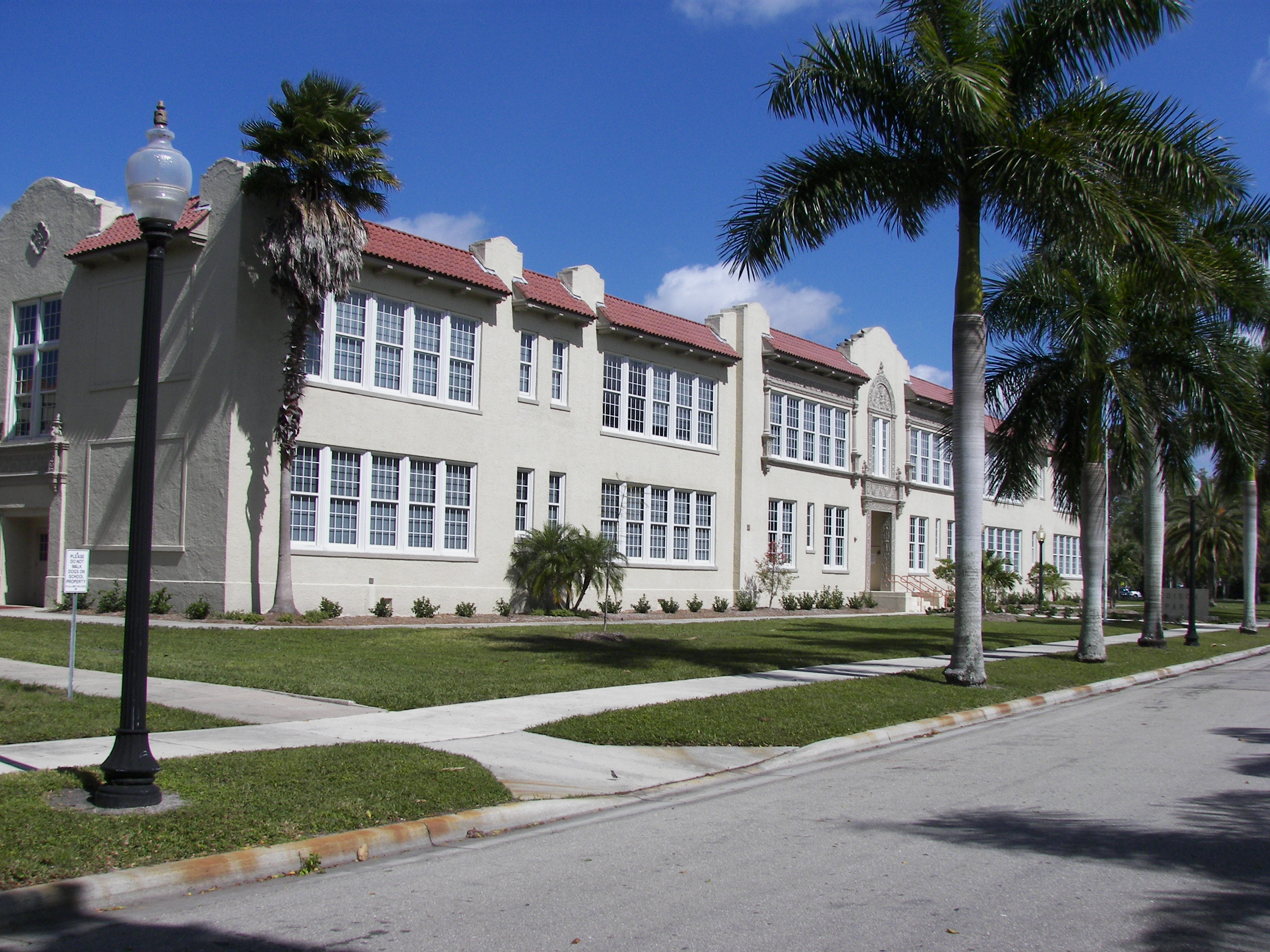

- Location within Florida Location within the United States
- Location: 2401 Euclid Ave., Fort Myers, Florida
- Coordinates: 26°37′57″N 81°52′30″W
- Area: less than one acre
- Built: 1927
- Built by: J.M. Lawton
- Architect: L. N. Iredell
- Architectural style: Late 19th And 20th Century Revivals
- MPS: Lee County MPS
- NRHP reference No.: 99000524
- Added to NRHP: May 5, 1999

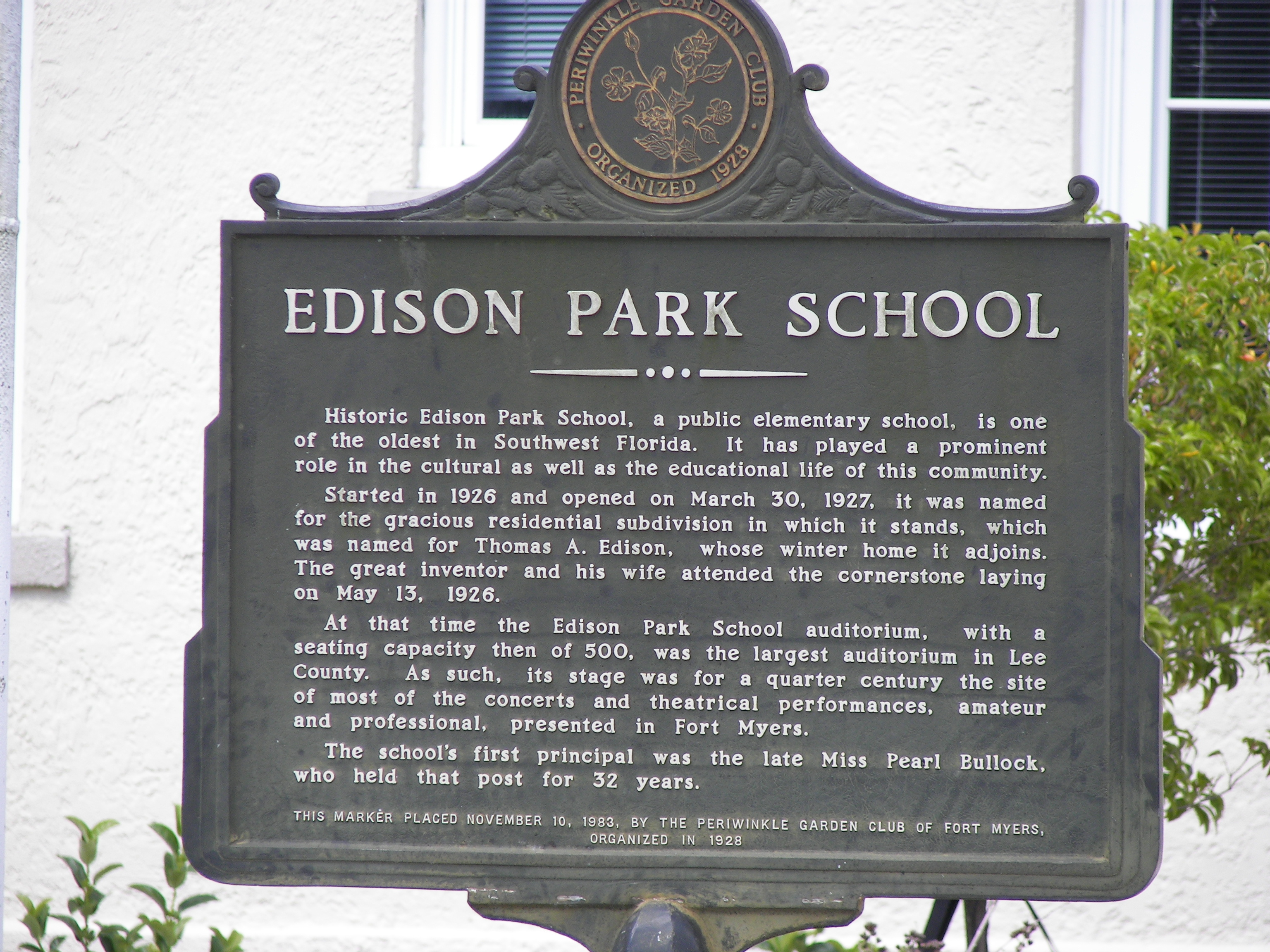

Edison Park Creative and Expressive Arts Elementary School is an elementary school in Fort Myers, Florida. The school has drama, music education and dance programs. It is part of the Lee County School District. The historic building, formerly Edison Park School, is located at 2401 Euclid Avenue and was added to the U.S. National Register of Historic Places on May 5, 1999.

This property is part of the Lee County Multiple Property Submission, a Multiple Property Submission to the National Register.
