= Fort Myers Beach, Florida =

- Town
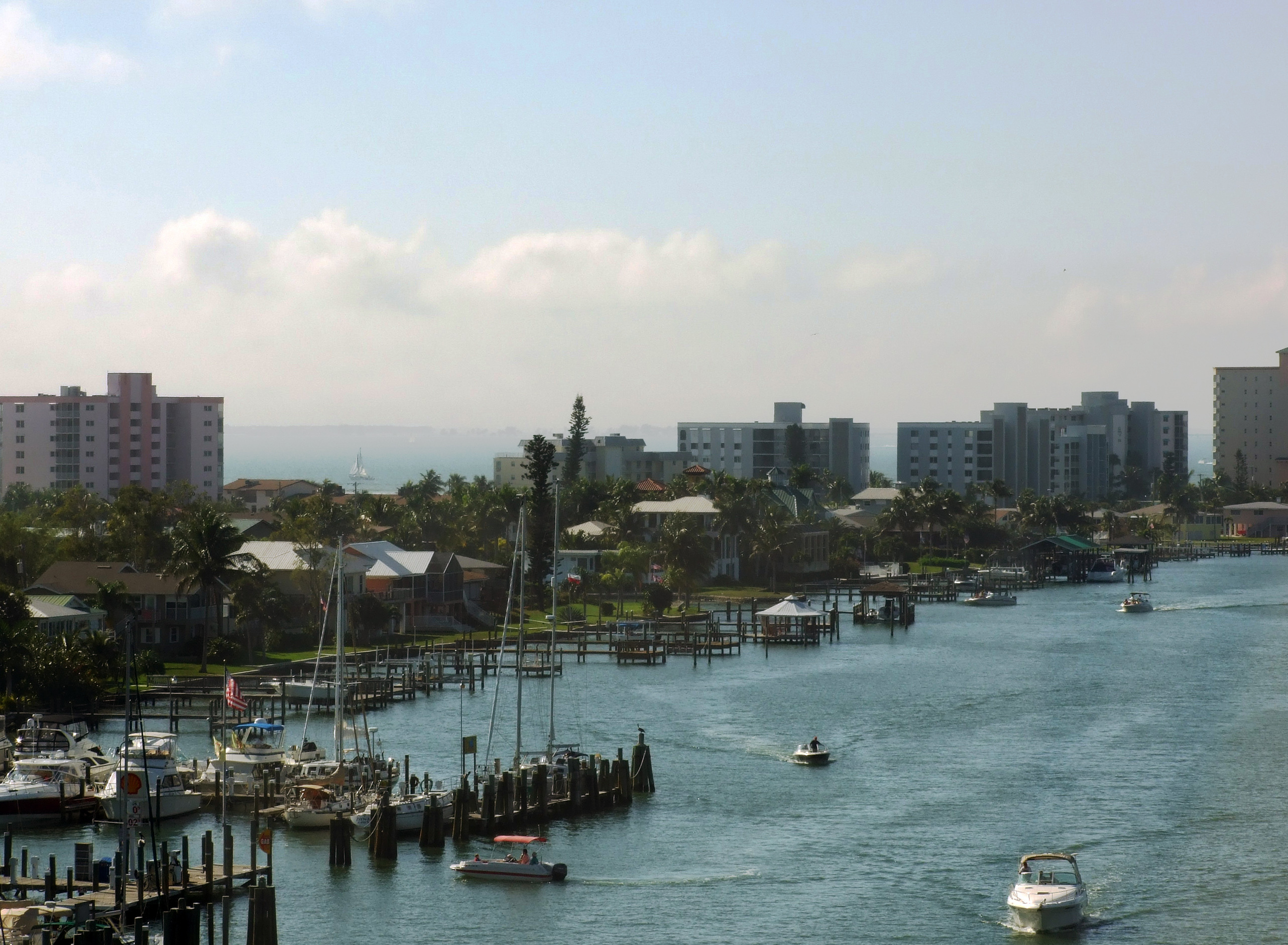
- Harbor at Fort Myers Beach

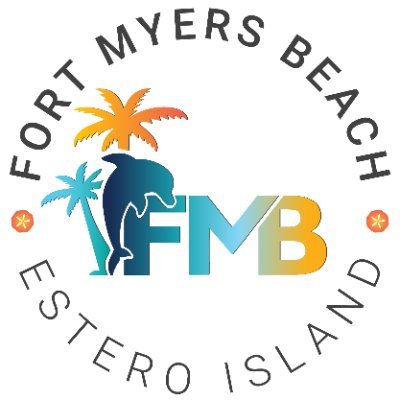
- Seal

- Location in Lee County and the state of Florida
- Coordinates: 26°26′00″N 81°55′14″W
- Country: United States
- State: Florida
- County: Lee
- Incorporated: December 31, 1995

Government
  - Type: Council-Manager

Area
  - Total: 6.17 sq mi (15.98 km^{2})
  - Land: 2.78 sq mi (7.20 km^{2})
  - Water: 3.39 sq mi (8.78 km^{2})
- Elevation: 3 ft (0.91 m)

Population (2020)
  - Total: 5,582
  - Density: 2,006.8/sq mi (774.84/km^{2})
- Time zone: UTC-5 (Eastern (EST))
  - Summer (DST): UTC-4 (EDT)
- ZIP codes: 33931-33932
- Area code: 239
- FIPS code: 12-24150
- GNIS feature ID: 2406510
- Website: www.fortmyersbeachfl.gov

Fort Myers Beach is a town located on the north end of Estero Island in Lee County, Florida, United States. The town is on the Gulf of Mexico and is accessed from the mainland by a bridge over Estero Bay. It is part of the Cape Coral-Fort Myers, Florida Metropolitan Statistical Area. It was officially incorporated on December 31, 1995. The population was 5,582 at the 2020 census, down from 6,277 at the 2010 census.

== History ==
=== Early history ===
The Calusa Indians first inhabited Estero Island, the island that Fort Myers Beach occupies, 2,000 years ago. The Calusa Indians resisted Spanish colonization attempts successfully including those by Ponce de León in 1513 and 1521. The Calusa met their demise 150 years later due to disease, hostilities, and political and economic upheaval. In the mid to late 1700s, Cuban fishermen then began to settle a small fishing village known as a Ranchero. This effectively displaced the remaining Calusa. In 1845, Florida became the 27th state.

=== American settlement ===
The Homestead Act of 1862 initiated American settlements on Estero Island. In 1862, Robert Gilbert received a homestead grant at the end of Connecticut Street, the highest point on Fort Myers Beach. In 1911, William Case developed the first subdivision and cottage rental industry. By 1914, all the property on the island was homesteaded with little industry beyond a hotel, fishing, gardening, and a sawmill operated by the Koreshan Unity (a communal society based on mainland Estero). At this point, Estero Island was named Crescent Beach.

Development on Crescent Beach was slow until the 1920s when Florida gained national attention as a vacation destination. In 1921, a toll bridge was opened connecting the beach to the mainland, followed closely by the construction of two casinos, hotels, a pier and the island's first canal. The land boom ended with the hurricanes of 1921 and 1926 that challenged the paradise appeal of southwest Florida. Despite entering a depression, Crescent Beach continued to gain small businesses, restaurants, subdivisions, and a school. In the 1950s, Crescent Beach continued to modernize. Many hotels were built including the Rancho del Mar, which boasted the first swimming pool. Additionally, the swing bridge was electrified to facilitate traffic. During this time, "pink gold" or pink shrimp were discovered igniting the shrimping industry and ancillary businesses to support it as the population increased by 50 percent. During this second land boom, numerous civic organizations, churches, local newspapers, weather and US Coast Guard stations, and the Beach Library were added to the island. The library became the first free public library in Lee County and opened in 1955 in a one-room cottage with a single librarian.

On December 31, 1995, legislation was passed to incorporate the town of Fort Myers Beach. The island has year-round and seasonal residents, and a tourism industry.

== Geography ==
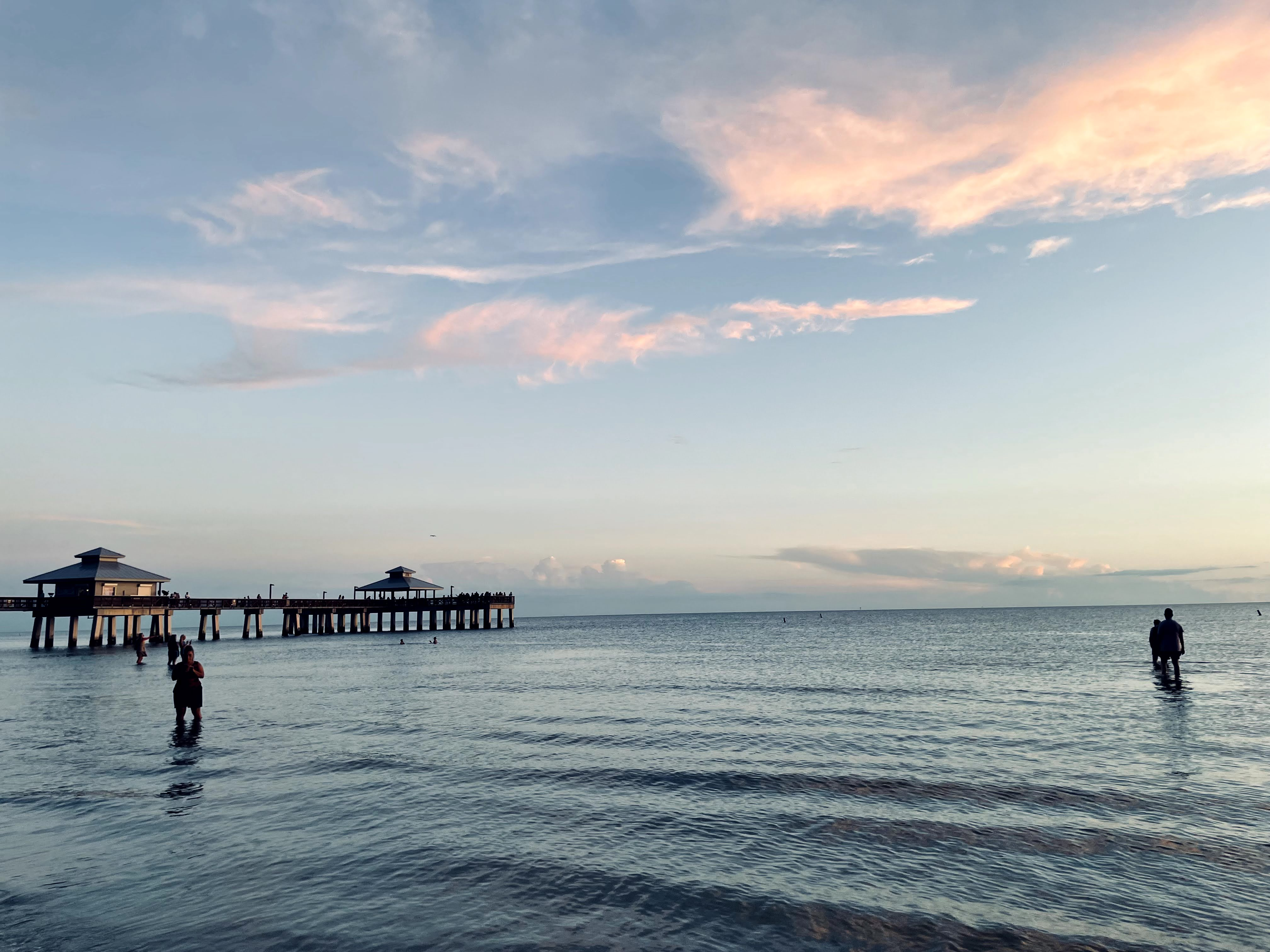
Fort Myers Beach Pier

The town is situated on the north end of Estero Island, one of the barrier islands in the Gulf of Mexico off the coast of Fort Myers, Florida.

According to the United States Census Bureau, the town has a total area of 6.2 square miles (16 km^{2}), of which 2.9 square miles (7.5 km^{2}) is land and 3.3 square miles (8.5 km^{2}) (53.41%) is water.

== Climate ==
Fort Myers Beach has a tropical climate and has the following statistics on average. It receives 56 inches of rain and 0 inches of snow per year. The number of days with any measurable precipitation is 76. There are 265 sunny days per year. The July high is around 89 degrees and the low is 75 degrees. The January high is 75 and the low is 55.

=== Hurricane Ian ===
On September 28, 2022, Hurricane Ian made landfall north of Fort Myers Beach as a Category 4 hurricane, causing damage and loss of life in the city due to high winds and destructive storm surge, which damaged the majority of homes and businesses along the coastline, including the Times Square. Almost all infrastructure in the area was damaged leaving the island with a continual rebuilding project.

== Demographics ==
Historical population
Census	Pop.	Note	%±
1960	2,463		—
1970	4,305		74.8%
1980	5,753		33.6%
1990	9,284		61.4%
2000	6,561		−29.3%
2010	6,277		−4.3%
2020	5,582		−11.1%

=== Racial and ethnic composition ===
Fort Myers Beach racial composition (Hispanics excluded from racial categories) (NH = Non-Hispanic)
Race	Pop 2010	Pop 2020	% 2010	% 2020
White (NH)	5,999	5,272	95.57%	94.45%
Black or African American (NH)	16	13	0.25%	0.23%
Native American or Alaska Native (NH)	10	10	0.16%	0.18%
Asian (NH)	34	12	0.54%	0.21%
Pacific Islander or Native Hawaiian (NH)	1	0	0.02%	0.00%
Some other race (NH)	6	14	0.10%	0.25%
Two or more races/Multiracial (NH)	36	101	0.57%	1.81%
Hispanic or Latino (any race)	175	160	2.79%	2.87%
Total	6,277	5,582	100.00%	100.00%

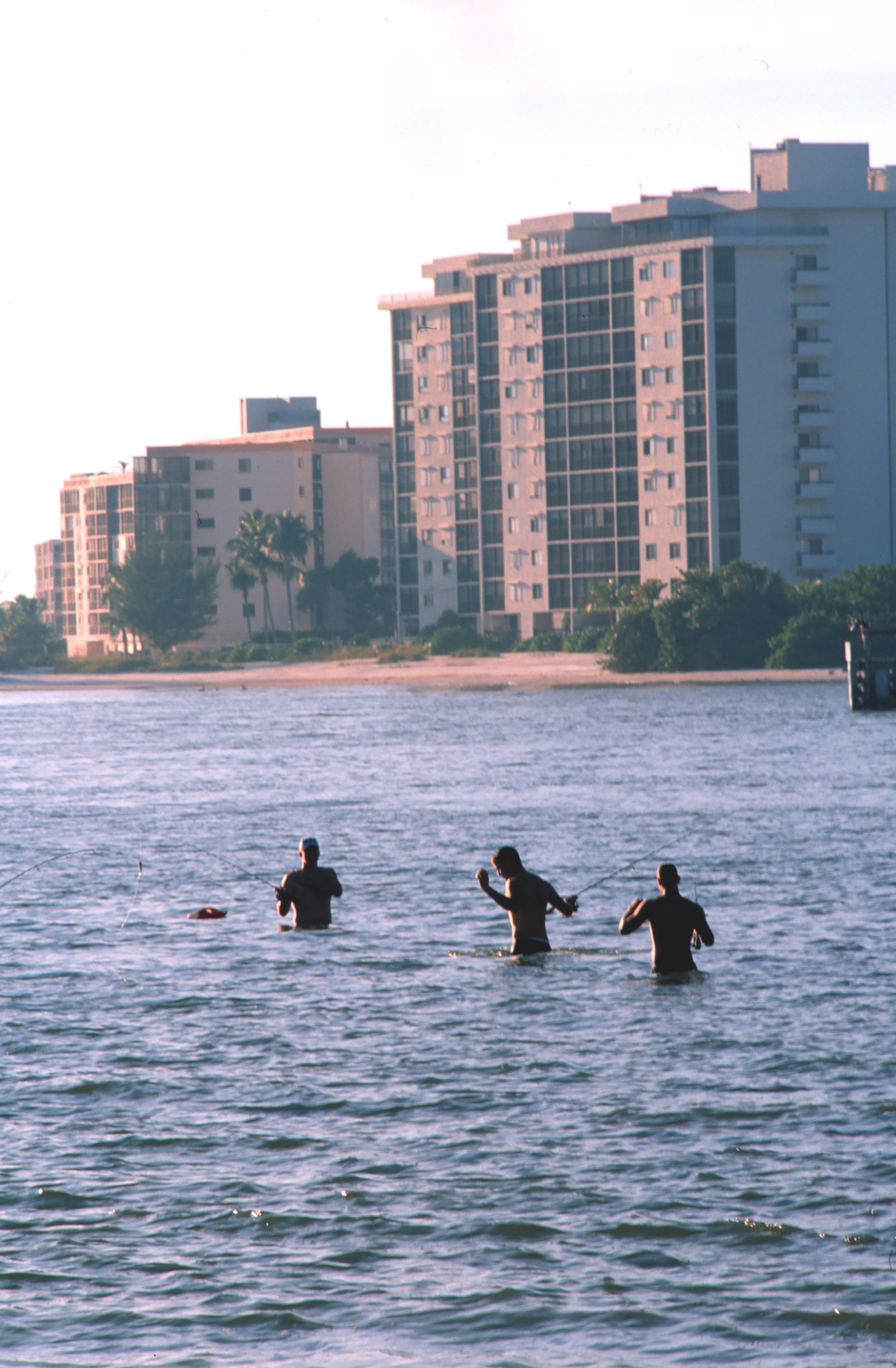
Fishermen wading in Fort Myers Beach

=== 2020 census ===
As of the 2020 census, Fort Myers Beach had a population of 5,582. The median age was 67.8 years. 3.6% of residents were under the age of 18 and 58.2% of residents were 65 years of age or older. For every 100 females there were 95.8 males, and for every 100 females age 18 and over there were 95.2 males age 18 and over.

100.0% of residents lived in urban areas, while 0.0% lived in rural areas.

There were 3,106 households in Fort Myers Beach, of which 5.3% had children under the age of 18 living in them. Of all households, 54.2% were married-couple households, 18.0% were households with a male householder and no spouse or partner present, and 22.7% were households with a female householder and no spouse or partner present. About 33.6% of all households were made up of individuals and 22.3% had someone living alone who was 65 years of age or older.

There were 9,460 housing units, of which 67.2% were vacant. The homeowner vacancy rate was 3.6% and the rental vacancy rate was 44.1%.

The 2020 ACS five-year estimates reported 2,198 families residing in the town.

=== 2010 census ===
As of the 2010 United States census, there were 6,277 people, 3,596 households, and 2,025 families residing in the town.

The population density in 2010 was 2,262.8 inhabitants per square mile (873.7/km^{2}). There were 9,402 housing units at an average density of 3,248.3 per square mile (1,254.2/km^{2}).

In 2010, there were 3,444 households, out of which 7.9% had children under the age of 18 living with them, 50.4% were married couples living together, 4.0% had a female householder with no husband present, and 43.4% were non-families. 35.6% of all households were made up of individuals, and 17.7% had someone living alone who was 65 years of age or older. The average household size was 1.81 and the average family size was 2.23.

In 2010, in the town, the population was spread out, with 5.4% under the age of 18, 3.2% from 18 to 24, 11.6% from 25 to 44, 34.9% from 45 to 64, and 45.4% who were 65 years of age or older. The median age was 63.2 years. For every 100 females, there were 97.9 males. For every 100 females age 18 and over, there were 96.9 males.

In 2010, the median income for a household in the town was $55,213, and the median income for a family was $79,292. Males had a median income of $41,761 versus $39,961 for females. The per capita income for the town was $57,902.

== Arts and culture ==
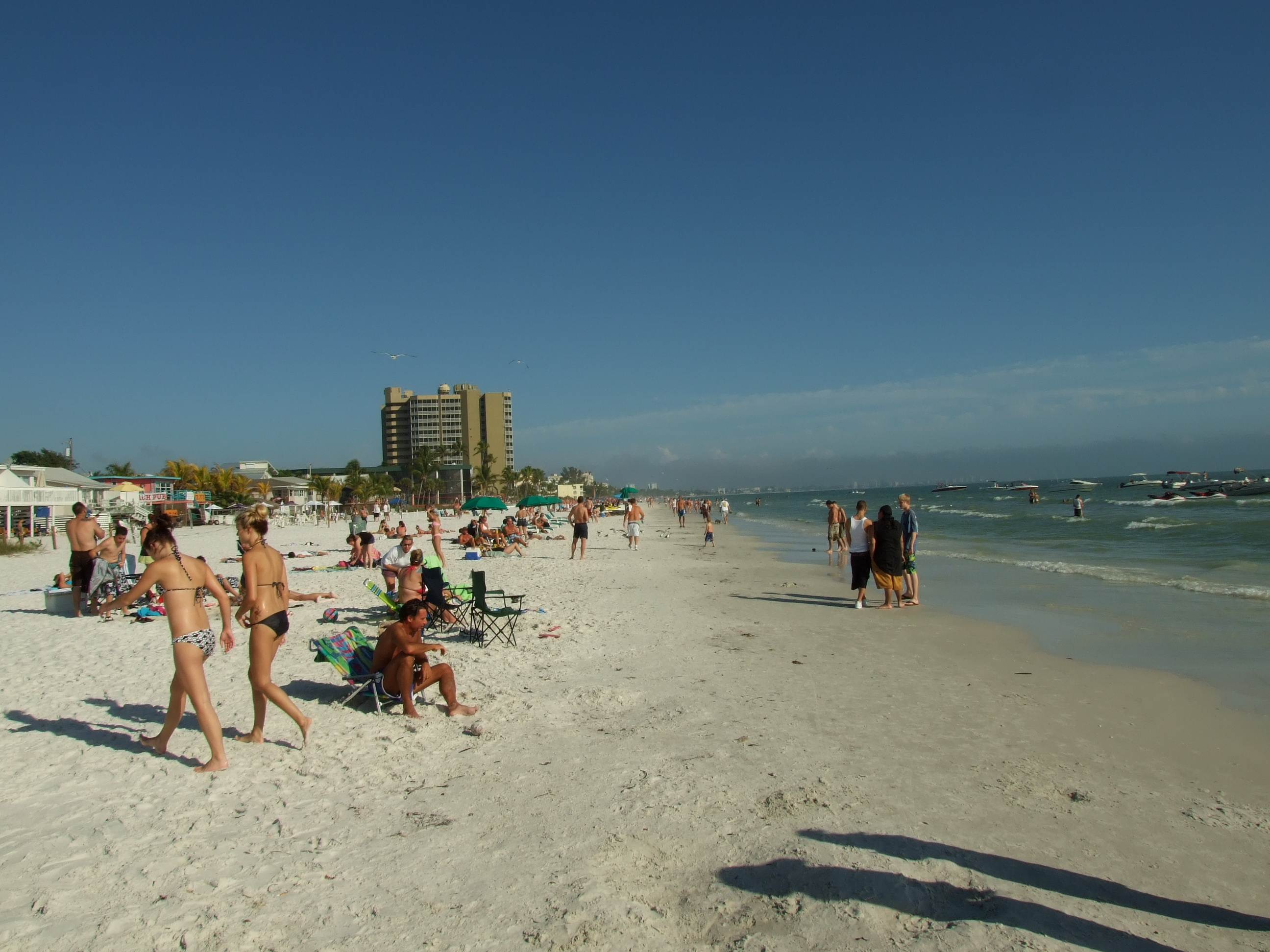
The beach of Fort Myers Beach

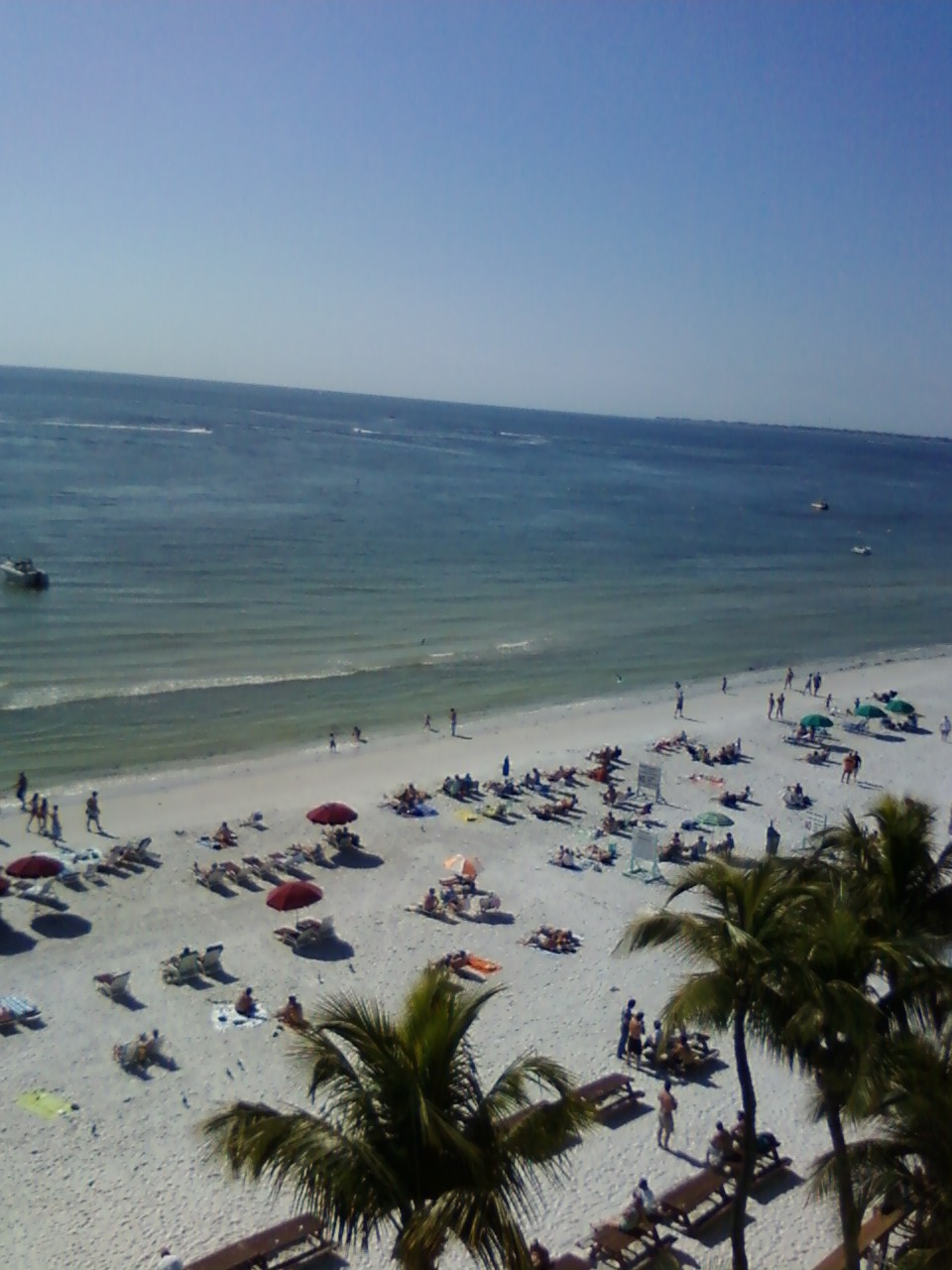
The beach as seen from the terrace of the Lani Kai Island Resort

The Fort Myers Beach Lions Club Shrimp Festival celebrates the shrimping industry on Fort Myers Beach, and features a shrimp eating competition, a 5k run, a parade, a pageant, and a food and crafts exposition.

Taste of the Beach takes features local restaurants offering food samples.

Fort Myers Beach Pirate Festival features a pirate bazaar, themed live music and performances, live ship battles, children's activities and the jolly pub quest.

The American Sand Sculpting Championship is the largest sand sculpting event in the United States; nearly 47,000 attendees visit and 2,000 tons of sand are sculpted.

Fort Myers Beach Christmas Boat Parade features 30 to 50 illuminated boats decorated with animated Christmas scenes.

Saint Raphael's Episcopal Church hosts the Blessing of the Shrimp Fleet, an annual event started in 1952 to bless all the boats and their crews.

== Parks and recreation ==
- Bay Oaks Park, a recreational facility and community center. It features outdoor tennis courts, baseball fields, disk golf course and a small playground.
- Bayside Veterans Park, a small park consisting of a stage and area for portable seating overlooking over Matanzas Harbor.
- Fort Myers Beach Community Pool, a public pool with a water slide, kiddie pool and water works areas.
- The Mound House, an archaeological and historical site consisting of a small park and museum.
- Newton Beach Park, a small public beach park. It housed the 1953 Seven Seas Cottage of Jim and Ellie Newton, after which it was named, until its destruction by hurricane Ian.

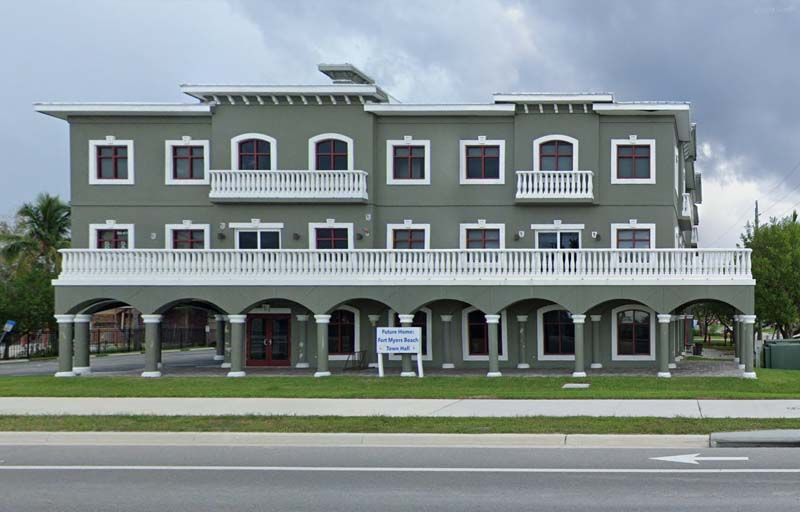
Town Hall

== Government ==
Fort Myers Beach is governed by a five-member town council.

== Education ==
Fort Myers Beach Elementary School is the only school located on Fort Myers Beach.

== Infrastructure ==
Fort Myers Beach is served by LeeTran buses operated by the county.

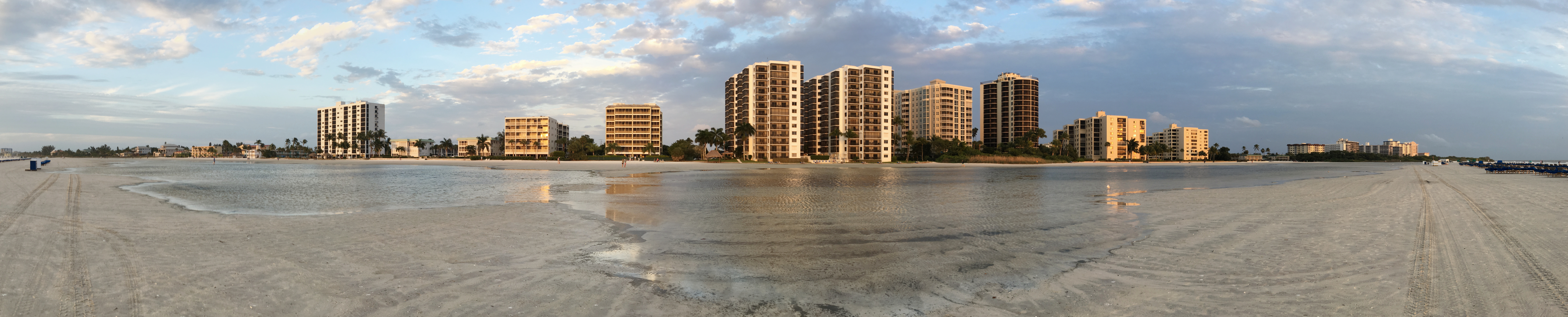
Fort Myers Beach
