= J. Colin English School =

- U.S. National Register of Historic Places
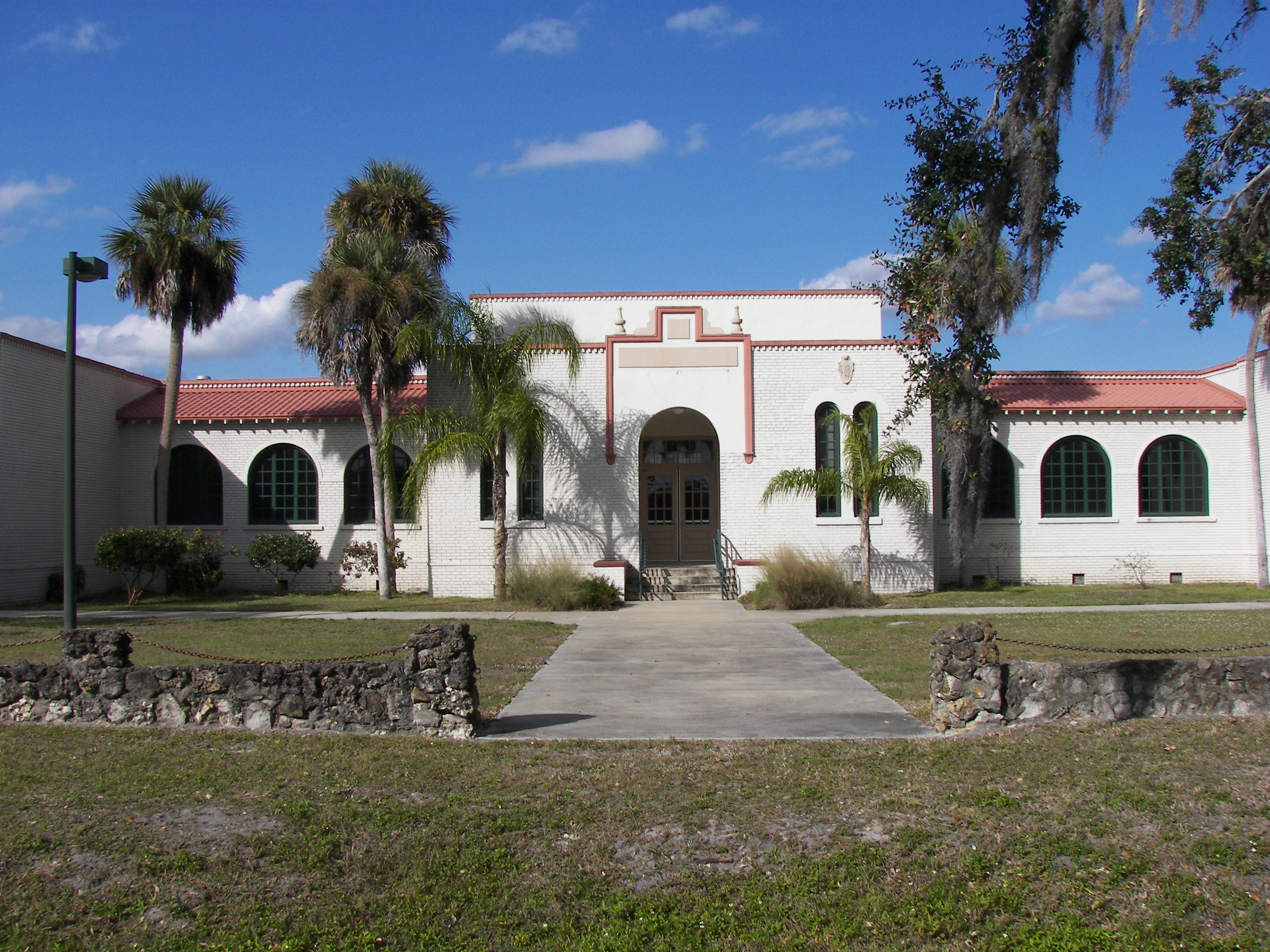
- Location: North Fort Myers, Florida
- Coordinates: 26°40′57″N 81°53′16″W
- Built: 1928
- Architect: N. Gaillard Walker, C. Franklyn Wheeler
- Architectural style: Mediterranean Revival
- MPS: Lee County Multiple Property Submission
- NRHP reference No.: 99000798
- Added to NRHP: July 8, 1999

The J. Colin English School (also known as the J. Colin English Elementary School) is a historic school in North Fort Myers, Florida, United States. It is located at 120 Pine Island Road. On July 8, 1999, it was added to the U.S. National Register of Historic Places.

This property is part of the Lee County Multiple Property Submission, a Multiple Property Submission to the National Register. The school is named for Florida school superintendent J. Colin English.
