= Cap and Skull =

Honor society at Rutgers University, US

- Founded: January 18, 1900; 126 years ago–1969; Reestablished 1982; Rutgers University
- Type: Senior society
- Affiliation: Independent
- Status: Active
- Emphasis: Academics, athletics, the arts, and public service
- Scope: Local
- Motto: Spectemur agendo "Let us be judged by our actions"
- Pillars: Spirit, History, and Tradition
- Chapters: 1
- Members: 18 active
- Nickname: Skulls
- Headquarters: 613 George Street; New Brunswick, New Jersey 08901; United States
- Website: capandskull.org

Cap and Skull is a co-educational senior honor society at Rutgers University in New Jersey. It was founded on January 18, 1900. Admission to Cap and Skull is dependent on excellence in academics, athletics, the arts, and public service. The organization considers leadership and character as factors for membership. Eighteen members are selected each year.

== History ==
On January 18, 1900, ten members of the senior class of Rutgers College met in the Chi Psi lodge to form Cap and Skull. Drawing inspiration from Skull and Bones and Quill and Dagger, Yale and Cornell's senior class honor societies, Cap and Skull aimed to form a similar honor society at Rutgers.

The ten founders drew up a constitution and adopted a code of secrecy and a motto. To ensure the exclusivity of the organization, the selection of a new member required a unanimous vote of the current members. In the first two decades, no more than 80 men joined the organization.

In the 1920s, the society began to reexamine its selection criteria to increase membership. Under the new system, each leadership position and honor on campus was awarded a point value, and students with the highest cumulative value were selected for induction. In 1923, in response to the growing student body, the number of members to be tapped each year was fixed at twelve and a tri-fold criterion for selection was established:

1. Activities, athletic, and campus
2. Scholarship
3. Character and service to Rutgers

With the onset of World War II, many members of the Rutgers community left college to serve in the military. Only ten members were selected for Cap and Skull in 1944, and no one was tapped in 1945. In October 1945, members of the administration who were also Cap and Skull members were asked to make nominations for the class of 1946.

Cap and Skull resumed the traditional twelve-member selection in 1948. On January 31, 1950, an all-day gala celebration was held in honor of Cap and Skull's golden anniversary—the first of the ten-year reunions that are still held today. The golden anniversary celebrated the 440 men selected as members of the society during those first fifty years.

=== Demise and rebirth ===
Through the 1960s, sweeping social changes occurred and organizations such as Cap and Skull came under scrutiny. In 1969, Cap and Skull graduated its last class. Its alumni retained their ties and the underlying need for the organization remained. In 1981, Rutgers College students again discussed the need for an organization or honor that would recognize leadership contributions made by members of the senior class. Cap and Skull re-emerged in 1982, and a reunion was held to celebrate the tapping of new members.

In November 1990, the Cap and Skull Room was formally leased, solidifying Cap and Skull's physical presence on campus. In 2000, a large gala event was held for the 100th anniversary of Cap and Skull and members endowed an annual scholarship to Rutgers students. Author William B. Brahms, a society member, compiled a detailed history with full biographies of all inducted members of the first 100 years. It was privately printed by the society, but is available at the Rutgers University Special Collections and Archives.

== Symbols ==
The motto of Cap and Skull is Spectemur agendo or "Let us be judged by our actions". Its pillars are Spirit, History, and Tradition.

== Membership ==
Today, Cap and Skull represents many of the diverse organizations on campus and is now composed of undergraduate students from any of the university's reorganized schools. Formerly only members of Rutgers College (which had become co-educational in 1972) and Rutgers College affiliates from the School of Pharmacy, Engineering, and Mason Gross School of the Arts were tapped.

Admission to Cap and Skull is dependent on excellence in academics, athletics, the arts, and public service. The organization considers leadership and character as factors for membership. Using these criteria, only eighteen new members are selected each year.

== Notable members ==
Following are some of the notable members of Cap and Skull.

Name	Initiation	Notability	Ref.
Richard H. Askin	1969	CEO of Tribune Entertainment and president of Samuel Goldwyn Television	
Al Aronowitz	1959	Writer and friend of Ginsberg, Jack Kerouac, Neal Cassady, Amiri Baraka, and George Harrison	
Jay M. Bernhardt	1991	President of Emerson College	
Samuel G. Blackman	1927	Editor with the Associated Press and reporter who broke the Lindbergh kidnapping story	
William B. Brahms	1989	Librarian, encyclopedist, author, and historian	
John J. Byrne	1954	Chairman and GEO of GEICO and chairman and CEO of White Mountains Insurance Group	
Clifford P. Case	1925	United States Senate	
Jay Chiat	1953	Founder of TBWA\Chiat\Day advertising agency	
Harry Cicma	2004	Tennis player and sports anchor	
Stanley Norman Cohen	1956	Pioneer of gene splicing	
Robert Cooke	1900	First researcher to identify antihistamines	
James Dale	1993	Gay rights activist, and litigant in Boy Scouts of America v. Dale	
Homer Hazel	1925	All-American football player and member of the College Football Hall of Fame	
Alfred Ellet Hitchner	1904	Football player and coach,	
Franklyn A, Johnson	1947	President of Jacksonville University and Southwest Florida College	
Robert E. Kelley	1956	Youngest lieutenant general in US Air Force history; superintendent of the United States Air Force Academy	
Herbert Klein	1951	United States House of Representatives	
Norman M. Ledgin	1950	Journalist and author	
Robert E. Lloyd	1967	Professional basketball player with the New York Nets	
T. David Mazzarella	1962	Editor of USA Today and president of Gannett International	
Anne Milgram	1992	Attorney general of New Jersey	
Charles Molnar	1956	Inventor of the personal computer	
David A. Morse	1929	Director-general of International Labour Organization who accepted the Nobel Peace Prize in 1969 on behalf of the ILO	
Robert Nash	1916	First player traded in the National Football League and the first captain of the New York Giants	
Ozzie Nelson	1927	Actor known for The Adventures of Ozzie and Harriet	
Richard Newcomb	1936	Author	
Randal Pinkett	1993	President and CEO of BCT Partners and winner of The Apprentice 4	
Rebecca Quick	1993	Anchor for CNBC Squawk Box	
Rey Ramsey	1982	Social justice entrepreneur	
Roland Renne	1927	President of Montana State University-Bozeman	
Paul Robeson	1919	Bass-baritone concert artist, actor, and professional football player	
Austin Wakeman Scott	1903	Professor at Harvard Law School	
John Scudder	1923	Physician and research pioneer in the field of blood storage and replacement	
Walter Spence	1934	Member of the International Swimming Hall of Fame	
Dick Standish	1964	Anchor and reporter on television and radio at KYW-TV in Philadelphia	

== See also ==
- Rutgers University student organizations
- Collegiate secret societies in North America
