= Cape Coral High School =

Public high school in Florida, US

Location
- 2300 Santa Barbara Blvd; Cape Coral, Florida 33991; United States; 26°36′30″N 81°58′31″W

Information
- Type: Public high school
- Established: 1979
- School district: The School District of Lee County
- Principal: Ryan Jackson
- Teaching staff: 81.20 (on FTE basis)
- Grades: 9-12
- Enrollment: 2005 (2024-2025)
- Student to teacher ratio: 23.84
- Colors: Blue and Orange
- Mascot: "Breezy" the Seahawk
- Accreditation: International Baccalaureate
- Newspaper: The Seahawk's Eye
- Website: cch.leeschools.net

Cape Coral High School is located in Cape Coral, Florida. It is one of six high schools in the city of Cape Coral and is also a part of the Lee County School District system.

As of the 2024-2025 school year, the school had an enrollment of 2,005 students and 81 classroom teachers (on a FTE basis.)

== Awards and recognition ==
During the 1988–89 school year, Cape Coral High School was recognized with the Blue Ribbon School Award of Excellence by the United States Department of Education, the highest award an American school can receive from the department.

In 1996, Cape Coral High School's newspaper The Shell won the NSPA's high school newspaper competition in Orlando, Florida. It went on to rank 8th nationally. In 1997, The Shell repeated its win for the state of Florida. The paper, now known as The Seahawk's Eye, won a first place award from Autism Speaks during the 2008–2009 school year. It has also won first place from the National Asperger Association during both the 2009 and 2010 school years.

In spring 2006, the school was one of 17 in Florida selected as part of Sports Illustrated's "model SI Schools steroid and drug prevention initiative" for high school athletes.

In April 2007 the school was awarded accreditation by the International Baccalaureate Organization to offer the IB Diploma Programme, making it the second IB school in Lee County and putting the school on track to graduate its first special needs class in 2009.

== Achievements ==
The Cape Coral High School soccer team won the Class 4A State Soccer Championship 2010–2011.

== Major incidents ==
In 2013, a human fetus was discovered in a mason jar at the school.

In 2019, for the first time a school shooting threat was made. The threat was written on a bathroom stall using a permanent marker, stating "school shooting soon, ha ha ha ha". A young boy was shortly arrested upon suspicion of being behind the threat.

== Athletics ==
Cape Coral High School offers a variety of athletic programs for students during the fall, winter and spring. Sports offered include:

- Baseball
- Basketball
- Bowling
- Cross Country
- Cheerleading
- Diving
- Flag Football
- Football
- Golf
- Lacrosse
- Weightlifting
- Wrestling
- Soccer
- Softball
- Swimming
- Tennis
- Track
- Volleyball

== Teaching staff ==
Measurement	Cape Coral	State Ave.
Students per teacher	20	16
Classes taught by out-of-field teachers	8%	6%
Average number of years teaching	3	13
Teachers with advanced degrees	2%	35%

== Florida Comprehensive Assessment Test (FCAT) ==
The Florida Department of Education "graded" Cape Coral High School with a "B" in the 2019-2020 school year. For the previous school year, the school received a "B".

The state uses "school grades" to measure the overall performance of schools in Florida on the Florida Comprehensive Assessment Test. The grades (A-F) are based on three criteria: overall performance on FCAT, percentage of eligible students who took the test, and whether or not students made progress in reading and math.

== Student body ==
Ethnicity	Cape Coral
White, not Hispanic	2%
Hispanic	2%
Black, not Hispanic	88%
Multiracial	8%
Asian/Pacific Islander	0%

	Cape Coral	State Ave.
Eligible for free/reduced price lunch	38%	58%

== Notable alumni ==
- Nate Allen- Former NFL safety
- Shane McClanahan- pitcher for the Tampa Bay Rays
- Jaylen Watkins- defensive back, Current Head Football Coach for the School
- Karey Lee Woolsey- singer-songwriter
