= Cape Coral, Florida =

City in the United States

- City
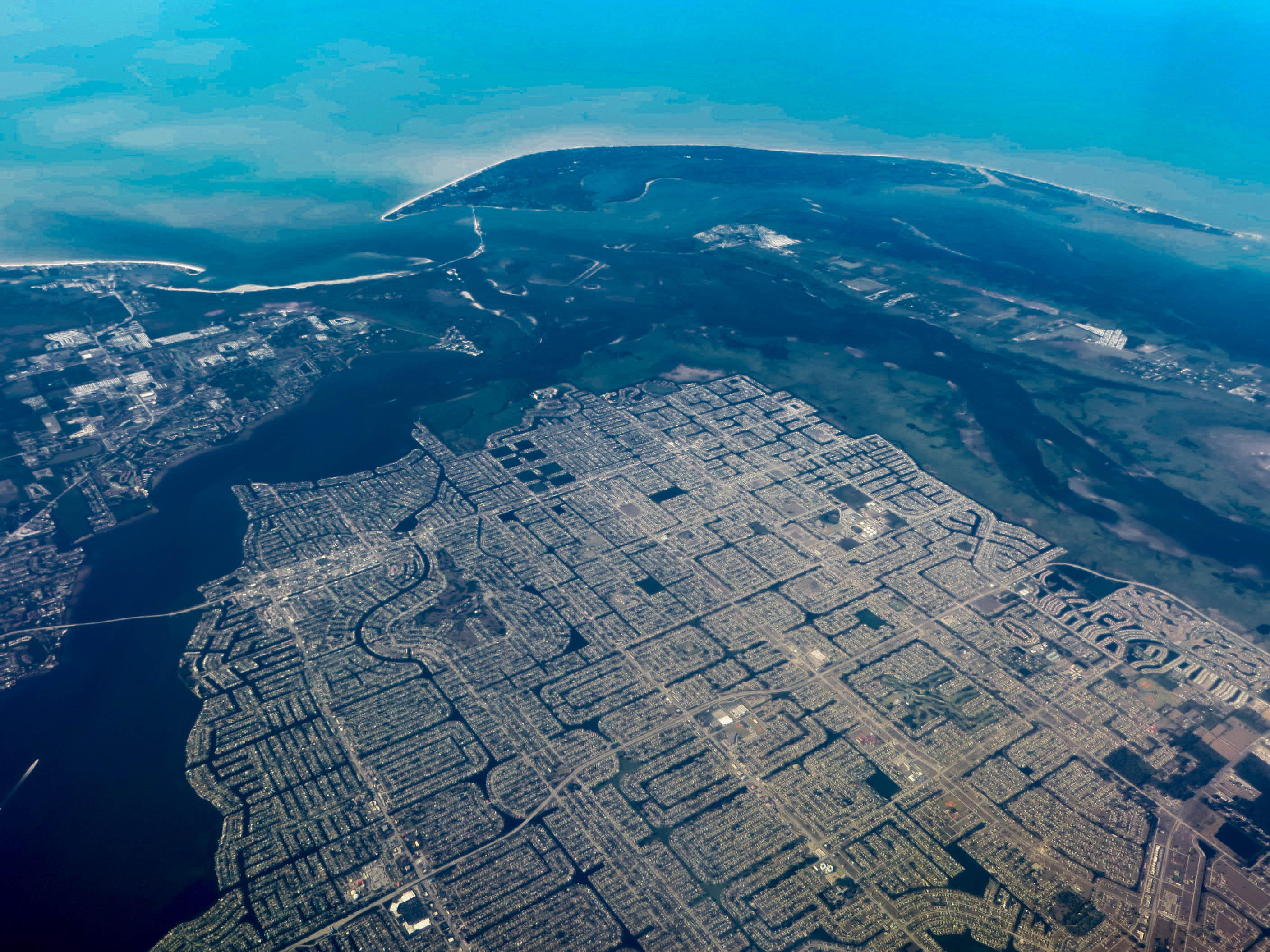
- Cape Coral from the air, looking southwest

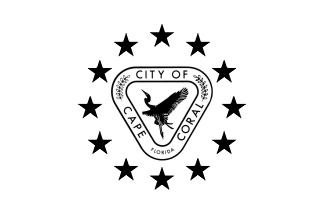
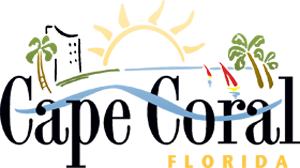
- Flag City Logo
- Nickname: Venice of America
- Interactive map of Cape Coral, Florida
- Location within Florida Location within the United States
- Coordinates: 26°38′23″N 82°01′30″W
- Country: United States
- State: Florida
- County: Lee
- Founded: 1957
- Incorporated: August 18, 1970

Government
  - Type: Council–manager
  - Mayor: John Gunter
  - City manager: Michael Ilczyszyn

Area
  - City: 119.41 sq mi (309.26 km^{2})
  - Land: 106.03 sq mi (274.61 km^{2})
  - Water: 13.38 sq mi (34.65 km^{2}) 9%
- Elevation: 10 ft (3.0 m)

Population (2020)
  - City: 194,016
  - Estimate (2025): 236,264 ▲
  - Rank: US: 99th
  - Density: 1,829.9/sq mi (706.51/km^{2})
  - Urban: 599,242 (US: 71st)
  - Urban density: 1,806/sq mi (697.3/km^{2})
  - Metro: 760,822 (US: 77th)
- Time zone: UTC−05:00 (EST)
  - Summer (DST): UTC−04:00 (EDT)
- ZIP Codes: 33904, 33909, 33914, 33990, 33991, 33993
- Area code: 239
- FIPS code: 12-10275
- GNIS feature ID: 2403990
- Website: www.capecoral.gov

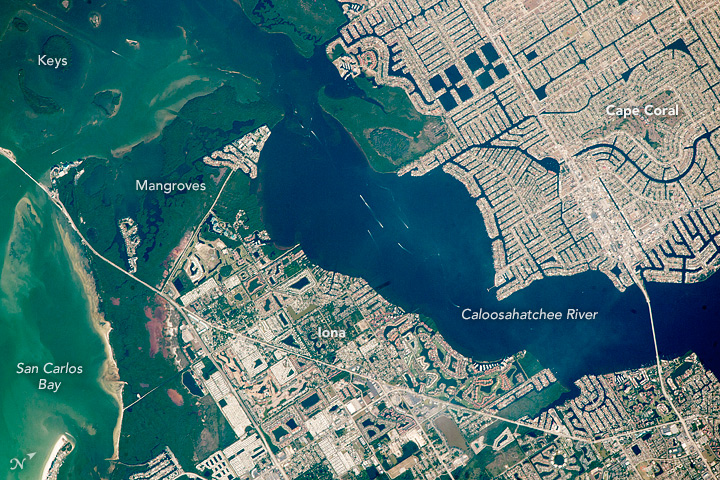
Cape Coral from the International Space Station, 2016

Cape Coral is a city in Lee County, Florida, United States, on the Gulf of Mexico. Founded in 1957, the city's population had grown to 194,016 as of the 2020 census, a 26% increase from 154,309 at the 2010 census, making it the ninth-most populous city in Florida. With an area of 120 square miles (310 km^{2}), Cape Coral is the largest city between Tampa and Miami in both population and area. It is the largest and principal city in the Cape Coral-Fort Myers, Florida Metropolitan Statistical Area. The city has over 400 mi (640 km) of navigable waterways, more than any other city on earth.

== History ==
At the time of first European contact, during the Spanish expedition led by Juan Ponce de León, the Cape Coral area was inhabited by the Calusa. They are believed to have constructed a canoe canal that crossed the Cape Coral peninsula from Matlacha Pass to Yellow Fever Creek, a tributary of the Caloosahatchee River. The development of Cape Coral since the 1950s has destroyed all evidence of the canal. After Florida became a state in 1845, multiple pioneers started selling and buying land in what is now Cape Coral under the Homestead Act. Cape Coral's modern history began in 1957 when two brothers from Baltimore, Maryland, Leonard and Jack Rosen, flew over the peninsula known as Redfish Point, across the Caloosahatchee River near present-day Fort Myers. The brothers, who were real estate developers, purchased a 103-square-mile (270 km^{2}) tract with a small group of partners for $678,000 and in 1958 began development of the city as a planned community.

The Gulf American Land Corporation (GALC) was formed to develop the area. GALC developed a marketing model that was a departure from traditional selling methods. Approval was secured from Lee County to master-plan the entire property into lots. Instead of listing the lots with real estate agents, GALC developed the land sales, dinner-party model, operating from banquet rooms in local hotels. People were invited to attend by offering a free dinner for two. The model, referred to as team-selling, allowed for a well-trained team to close deals in 90 minutes. Buyers would sign a contract and agree to come to the property within six months and cancel if not satisfied. Ezio Valentini, an Italian real estate developer, joined GALC and became director of sales. The program was so successful that offices were opened in 24 states, and an arrangement was made with Gulf American Airlines to fly prospective buyers to the properties from Miami.

Instead of borrowing from banks and lenders, the developers factored the sales contracts to pay for building the infrastructure. Canals were dug (without first obtaining state permits, an omission which later bankrupted GALC), streets paved, houses and businesses built.. Cape Coral was promoted like no other Florida development. Celebrities were brought in to tout the benefits of "the Cape", as it is known locally. The first building in Cape Coral was the Rosens' sales office. It was built where George's Auto now stands, at Cape Coral and Coronado Parkways. Cape Coral's first permanent resident was Kenny Schwartz, the Rosens' general manager. Cape Coral's first four homes were completed in May 1958, on Riverside and Flamingo Drives.

Development continued through the early 1960s, mostly on Redfish Point, south of Cape Coral Parkway. By 1963, the population was 2,850; 1,300 buildings had been finished or were under construction; 80 mi (130 km) of road had been built, and 160 mi (260 km) of canals had been dug. The public yacht club, a golf course, medical clinic and shopping center were up and running. A major addition for Cape Coral was the construction of the 3,400 feet (1,000 m) long Cape Coral Bridge across the Caloosahatchee River, which opened in early 1964. Before the bridge, a trip to Fort Myers was more than 20 mi (32 km) via Del Prado Boulevard and over the Edison Bridge to cross the river.

The city incorporated on August 18, 1970, and its population continued to grow rapidly until the real estate slowdown that gripped the region beginning in 2008. On September 28, 2022, Cape Coral suffered major damage when Hurricane Ian made landfall nearby.

== Geography ==
According to the United States Census Bureau, the city has a total area of 120 square miles (310.8 km^{2}), of which 110.09 square miles (285.1 km^{2}) is land and 9.91 square miles (25.7 km^{2}) (9%) is water. Cape Coral is a large peninsula and is bordered in the south and east by the Caloosahatchee River and in the west by Matlacha Pass. Fort Myers lies across the Caloosahatchee River to the east, and Matlacha and Pine Island lie across Matlacha Pass to the west. Matlacha Pass is home to Matlacha Pass National Wildlife Refuge and the Matlacha Pass Aquatic Preserve.

=== Flora and fauna ===
The area supports waterfowl, wading birds, migrant songbirds, gopher tortoises, dolphins and reptiles. Rotary Park is home to wading birds, raptors, butterflies, foxes and other wildlife. Nature enthusiasts can track exotic birds and native fish from the boardwalk at Lake Kennedy and watch the West Indian manatees at Sirenia Vista Park. Cape Coral is home to the largest population of burrowing owls in Florida.

=== Invasive species ===
Cape Coral is home to three invasive species, the green iguana, the spiny-tailed iguana, and the Nile monitor, which was discovered in 2009. The iguanas are found throughout southern Florida and generally do not pose a threat. The Nile monitor is however a large (3–7 feet), fast traveling, fast swimming carnivore with a wide diet, which can include fish, fowl, and small mammals. The city's many waterways work against its capture and provide an easy transportation route around the city.

=== Climate ===
The city features a borderline tropical savanna climate (Köppen climate classification: Aw), bordering on a tropical monsoon climate (Köppen climate classification: Am). The area averages 355 days of sunshine per year and experiences precipitation on 145 days per year. While the wet season (May to October) is hot and humid with rather erratic tropical downpours, dry seasons (November to April) tend to be pleasantly warm and see only sporadic precipitation. The city receives about 56 inches of rain each year, the majority of which falls from June to September. During the summer months, afternoon thunderstorms are heavy yet brief. The city is affected by the annual hurricane season, which begins officially on June 1 and continues through November.

Climate data for Cape Coral, FL
Month	Jan	Feb	Mar	Apr	May	Jun	Jul	Aug	Sep	Oct	Nov	Dec	Year
Record high °F (°C)	88 (31)	91 (33)	93 (34)	96 (36)	99 (37)	103 (39)	98 (37)	98 (37)	96 (36)	95 (35)	95 (35)	90 (32)	103 (39)
Mean daily maximum °F (°C)	75 (24)	78 (26)	81 (27)	85 (29)	90 (32)	91 (33)	92 (33)	92 (33)	90 (32)	87 (31)	81 (27)	77 (25)	85 (29)
Daily mean °F (°C)	65 (18)	67 (19)	70 (21)	75 (24)	79 (26)	82 (28)	83 (28)	83 (28)	82 (28)	78 (26)	72 (22)	67 (19)	75 (24)
Mean daily minimum °F (°C)	54 (12)	57 (14)	60 (16)	64 (18)	69 (21)	74 (23)	75 (24)	75 (24)	74 (23)	69 (21)	62 (17)	57 (14)	67 (19)
Record low °F (°C)	28 (−2)	32 (0)	33 (1)	39 (4)	52 (11)	60 (16)	66 (19)	67 (19)	67 (19)	48 (9)	34 (1)	26 (−3)	26 (−3)
Average precipitation inches (mm)	1.7 (43)	2.1 (53)	2.7 (69)	1.3 (33)	3.7 (94)	9 (230)	8.5 (220)	9 (230)	8.3 (210)	3.5 (89)	1.5 (38)	1.5 (38)	52.8 (1,340)
Average precipitation days (≥ 0.01 in)	7	8	7	6	10	18	22	22	20	11	7	7	145
Source: NOAA

== Demographics ==
Historical population
Census	Pop.	Note	%±
1970	10,193		—
1980	32,103		215.0%
1990	74,991		133.6%
2000	102,286		36.4%
2010	154,309		50.9%
2020	194,016		25.7%
2025 (est.)	236,264	▲	21.8%

Cape Coral, Florida – Racial and ethnic composition Note: the US Census treats Hispanic/Latino as an ethnic category. This table excludes Latinos from the racial categories and assigns them to a separate category. Hispanics/Latinos may be of any race.
Race / Ethnicity (NH = Non-Hispanic)	Pop 2000	Pop 2010	Pop 2020	% 2000	% 2010	% 2020
White (NH)	89,535	113,476	129,017	87.53%	73.54%	66.50%
Black or African American (NH)	1,831	5,679	7,597	1.79%	3.68%	3.92%
Native American or Alaska Native (NH)	227	356	350	0.22%	0.23%	0.18%
Asian (NH)	927	2,272	3,207	0.91%	1.47%	1.65%
Pacific Islander or Native Hawaiian (NH)	48	60	87	0.05%	0.04%	0.04%
Some other race (NH)	152	295	958	0.15%	0.19%	0.49%
Two or more races or Multiracial (NH)	1,045	2,150	6,649	1.02%	1.39%	3.43%
Hispanic or Latino (any race)	8,521	30,017	46,151	8.33%	19.45%	23.79%
Total	102,286	154,309	194,016	100.00%	100.00%	100.00%

As of the 2020 United States census, there were 194,016 people, 69,912 households, and 48,359 families residing in the city.

As of the 2010 United States census, there were 154,309 people, 56,313 households, and 40,405 families residing in the city.

As of 2021, Cape Coral was the eighth largest city in Florida by population. Nearly 60% of the population was between the ages of 18 and 64; residents under 25 outnumber residents over 65. Southwest Florida's 18–24 age group is growing at a faster rate than the state of Florida and the United States.

As of 2020, there were 74,387 households. The median income for a household in the city is $65,282. The per capita income for the city was $34,586. 9.9% of the population are below the poverty line.

As of 2000, 87.18% of residents spoke only English at home, while 7.61% spoke Spanish, 1.70% spoke German, 1.20% spoke Italian, 0.61% spoke French, and 0.41% spoke Tagalog. In total, 12.81% of the total population spoke languages other than English.

== Economy ==
The economy in Cape Coral is based on healthcare services, retail, and real estate/construction. The city's Economic Development Office promotes and incentivizes business relocation to Cape Coral. In 2016 the city's top five employers were the Lee Memorial Hospital, Lee County School System, Publix Super Markets, City of Cape Coral, and Walmart.

== Arts and culture ==
Mike Greenwell founded an amusement park named Mike Greenwell's Bat-A-Ball & Family Fun Park that opened in February 1992 and consisted of a mini-golf park, video games machines, a go cart track and other entertainment. The facility changed ownership in April 2019, and it was renamed to Gator Mike's Family Fun Park.

Both city libraries are part of the Lee County Library System. Cape Coral Lee County Public Library had 175,000 books in 2002. Northwest Regional Library holds over 70,000 items.

== Parks and recreation ==
Parks and recreation includes:

- SunSplash Water Park.
- A beach on the Caloosahatchee River at the public Yacht Basin and Club.
- Over 30 recreational parks which includes playgrounds, open fields, pavilions, workout equipment, walking paths, and golf courses.
- Ecological preserves, and an elevated nature trail through Florida mangroves at Four Mile Cove Ecological Preserve.

== Government ==
The city of Cape Coral operates under the council–manager form of government. City Council members are elected at large from seven districts. The mayor is also elected at large and is the eighth member of the council. The mayor presides over council meetings. On January 13, 2021, Mayor Joe Coviello died, and the City Council unanimously decided to appoint a mayor, rather than have a special election. The City Countil voted 6–1 to appoint council member John Gunter to the position of mayor. The City of Cape Coral provides police and fire services within the city.

== Education ==
Cape Coral has continuously expanded public and private school systems with high performance standards. Cape Coral is part of the Lee County School District, which is operated by the Lee County Board of Education. As of 2009, the Board of Education operated 8 elementary, 6 middle, and 5 high schools in the Cape. There are four public high schools in Cape Coral: Cape Coral High School, built in the late 1970s; Mariner High School, which opened in 1987; Ida S. Baker High School, founded in 2004 and named after one of the early principals of Cape Coral High School, which opened in 2005; and the newest, Island Coast High School, which opened its doors for the 2008–2009 school year. Cape Coral has created a municipal charter school system, known as Oasis Charter Schools. The system consists of two elementary schools, Oasis Middle School, and Oasis High School. The charter schools use the Core Knowledge and Cambridge Curricula. Since the system is public, there is no tuition. The municipal charter schools are available exclusively to children who live in Cape Coral.

The main campus of Florida SouthWestern State College is located immediately east of Cape Coral in Fort Myers. The college offers associate and bachelor's degrees, plus technical training in fields such as allied health programs, computer networking & programming, business administration, paralegal, criminal justice and fire science. 2009 enrollment was more than 16,000 students on four campuses. One of Florida's youngest state universities, Florida Gulf Coast University (FGCU), opened in 1997 in nearby Fort Myers and now serves more than 12,000 students. FGCU has established a Cape Coral satellite facility, which provides Cape students with a growing offering of core courses. The university offers undergraduate, graduate, and doctoral degrees, including an executive master's program, a college of business and engineering and biotechnology programs. Other colleges and universities serving the area are Hodges University, Southwest Florida College and Rasmussen College.

Cape Coral Technical College is a postsecondary educational institution operated by the Lee County public school system. It provides training in medical, computer and food-science fields. Employer-specific training, both on and off-site, is available through Business and Industry Services of Lee County which maintains an office in Cape Coral.

== Infrastructure ==
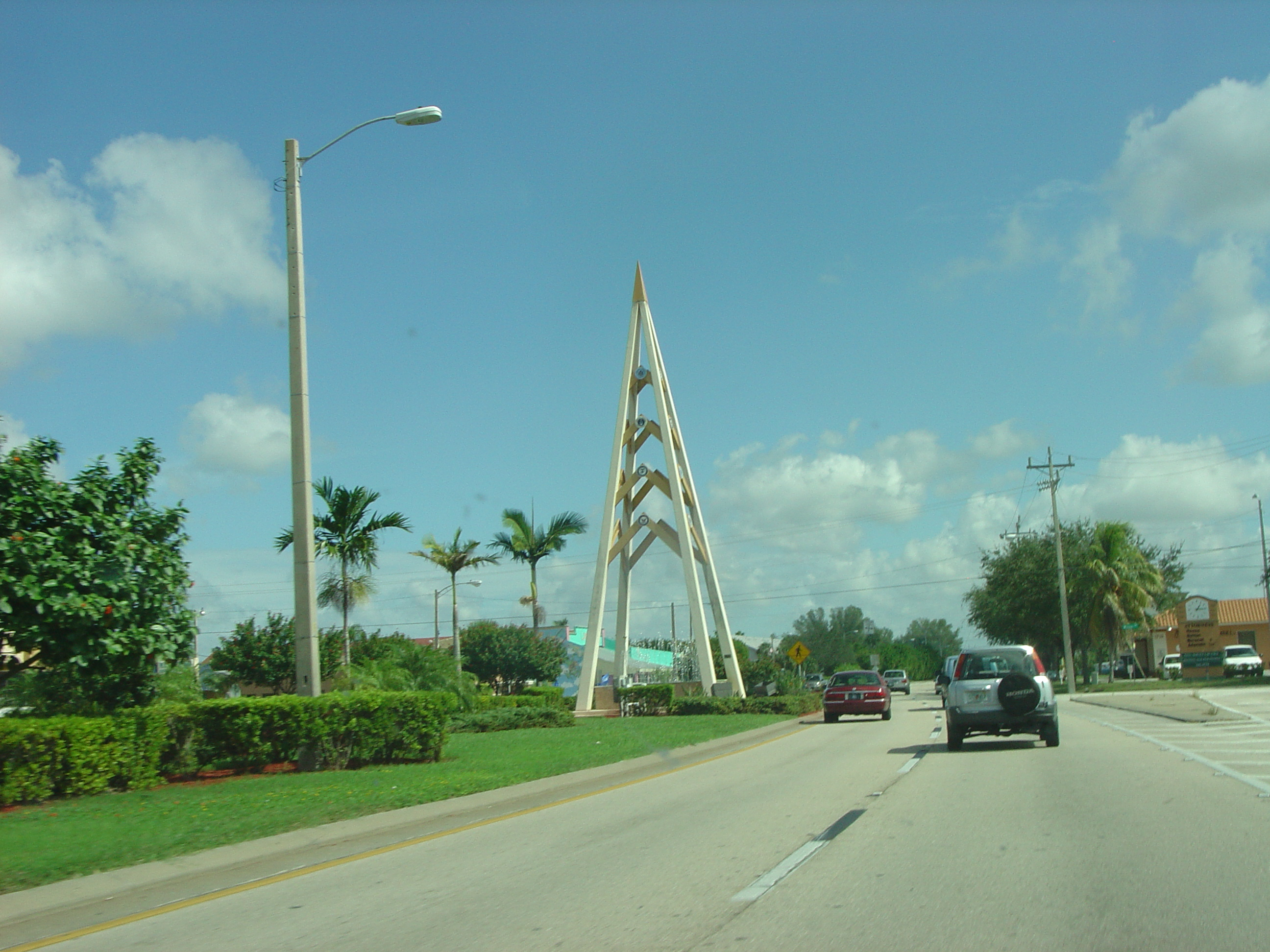
Cape Coral Parkway

=== Canals ===
The city has over 400 miles (640 km) of canals. Most of the canals are navigable, and some have access to the Gulf of Mexico. Cape Coral's canal system is so extensive that local ecology and tides have been affected. The system provides many residents with waterfront living with access to the Gulf of Mexico via the broad Caloosahatchee River and Matlacha Pass. The Parks and Recreation Department maintains three public boat launching facilities. The Gulf of Mexico provides access to smaller tropical islands, rookeries, and sports fishing grounds.

=== Roadways and bridges ===
Interstate 75 passes within 10 miles (16 km) of Cape Coral and connects northward to Tampa; and southeastward to Miami. Cape Coral borders on U.S. Highway 41. U.S. 41 and I-75 can be accessed from State Route 78 (Pine Island Road). Within the city a network of arterial roadways are established. Cape Coral has approximately 1,100 miles (1,800 km) of roadways. In general, the north–south routes are evenly spaced apart every one or two miles (3.2 km), and most of them have at least four lanes.

Cape Coral is connected to the south side of the Caloosahatchee River by two bridges. The 3,400 feet (1,000 m) long Cape Coral Bridge connects Cape Coral Parkway to College Parkway in McGregor. The Midpoint Memorial Bridge connects Veterans Parkway to Colonial Boulevard in Fort Myers. Several other bridges span the Caloosahatchee River east of Cape Coral in adjoining North Fort Myers. In 2026, the Lee County Department of Transportation and the City of Cape Coral plan on constructing a new westbound span for the Cape Coral Bridge. The westbound span, which was built in 1964, does not meet requirements set forth by Lee County. The $185 million project will include a new pedestrian bridge, an expansion to 6 lanes on both spans, removal of the toll booth on the Fort Myers side, and an expansion of the Cape Coral Parkway and Del Prado Boulevard intersection.

=== Transportation ===
Public transit services in Cape Coral are provided by LeeTran. LeeTran operates 18 fixed-route bus services, including six within Cape Coral.

Cape Coral is 14 miles (23 km) from Southwest Florida International Airport (RSW), which serves nearly 10 million passengers annually. In 2010, eighteen national and two international airlines, as well as the two major cargo companies, served the airport. Cape Coral is also served by Page Field, a general aviation airport in Fort Myers eight miles (13 km) from Cape Coral. Punta Gorda Airport (PGD) is located in Punta Gorda, 10 miles (16 km) north of Cape Coral.

=== Utilities ===
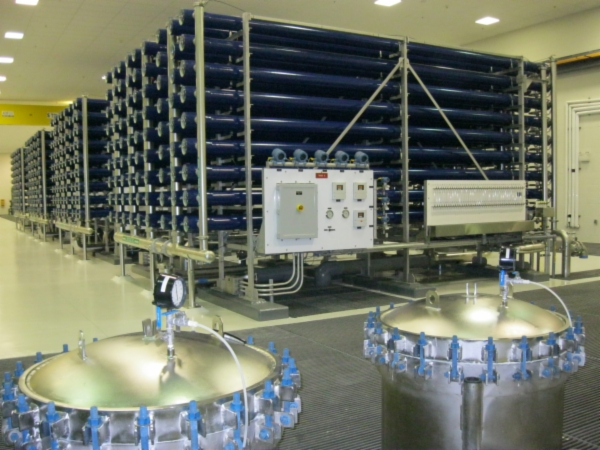
Reverse osmosis water purification plant in north Cape Coral

In 1977, Cape Coral became the first municipality in the United States to use the reverse osmosis process on a large scale with an initial operating capacity of 3,000,000 US gallons (11,000 m^{3}) per day. By 1985, the city had the largest low pressure reverse osmosis plant in the world, capable of producing 15 MGD (56,780 m^{3}/day).

Sewage is collected and highly treated to produce reclaimed water, locally known as "rescued water". Reclaimed water is distributed throughout the city through a dual water pipe system and used for irrigation. Alternatively, reclaimed water can be discharged into the Caloosahatchee River.

The Cape was among the first in Florida to deploy the new 4.9 GHz pre-WiMax wireless channel authorized by the FCC in 2003 for exclusive public safety use.

== Notable people ==
- Nate Allen, NFL safety
- Tony Bruno, radio personality
- Pat Burke, NBA player
- Stacy Carter, professional wrestler
- Dustin Diamond, actor
- Aïyb Dieng (1948-2025), Senegalese drummer and percussionist
- Earnest Graham, NFL running back
- Mike Greenwell, MLB player
- Jessica Holmes, TV host and news anchor
- Hilary Hemingway, author and niece of Ernest Hemingway
- Jeff Lindsay, author
- Shane McClanahan, MLB pitcher
- Frank C. McConnell, US Army brigadier general, retired in Cape Coral
- John Melendez, American Podcaster, Radio Personality and former Tonight Show announcer.
- Joseph Mercola, physician and alternative medicine proponent
- Seth Petruzelli, mixed martial arts fighter
- Niko Price, mixed martial arts fighter
- Tony Rombola, rock and blues guitarist
- Jason Smith, Olympic curler
- Greg Spires, NFL player
- Angela Watson, actress
- Michael Wendler, German singer
- Karey Lee Woolsey, singer-songwriter
- Mike Zunino, MLB catcher
