= Southwest Florida =

Region in Florida

Interactive Map of Southwest Florida
North Port–Bradenton, FL CSA
North Port–Bradenton–Sarasota, FL MSA
Punta Gorda, FL MSA
Arcadia, FL μSA
Cape Coral–Fort Myers–Naples, FL CSA
Cape Coral–Fort Myers, FL MSA
Naples–Marco Island, FL MSA
Clewiston, FL μSA
- Country: United States
- State(s): Florida
- Largest city: Cape Coral
- Other cities: Bradenton; Venice; Palmetto; Fort Myers; Naples; North Port; Marco Island

Southwest Florida (SWFL) is the region along the southwest Gulf coast of the U.S. state of Florida. The area is known for its beaches, subtropical landscape, and winter resort economy.

Definitions of the region vary, though its boundaries are generally considered to put it south of the Tampa Bay area, west of Lake Okeechobee, and mostly north of the Everglades and to include Manatee, Sarasota, Charlotte, Lee, and Collier counties. For some purposes, the inland counties of DeSoto, Glades, and Hendry, and the thinly populated mainland portion of Monroe County, south of Collier, are also included.

The region includes four metropolitan areas: the North Port-Bradenton-Sarasota MSA, the Cape Coral-Fort Myers MSA, the Naples-Marco Island MSA, and the Punta Gorda MSA. The most populous county in the region is Lee County (760,822 population), and the region's largest city is Cape Coral with a population of 194,016 as of 2020.

== History and development ==
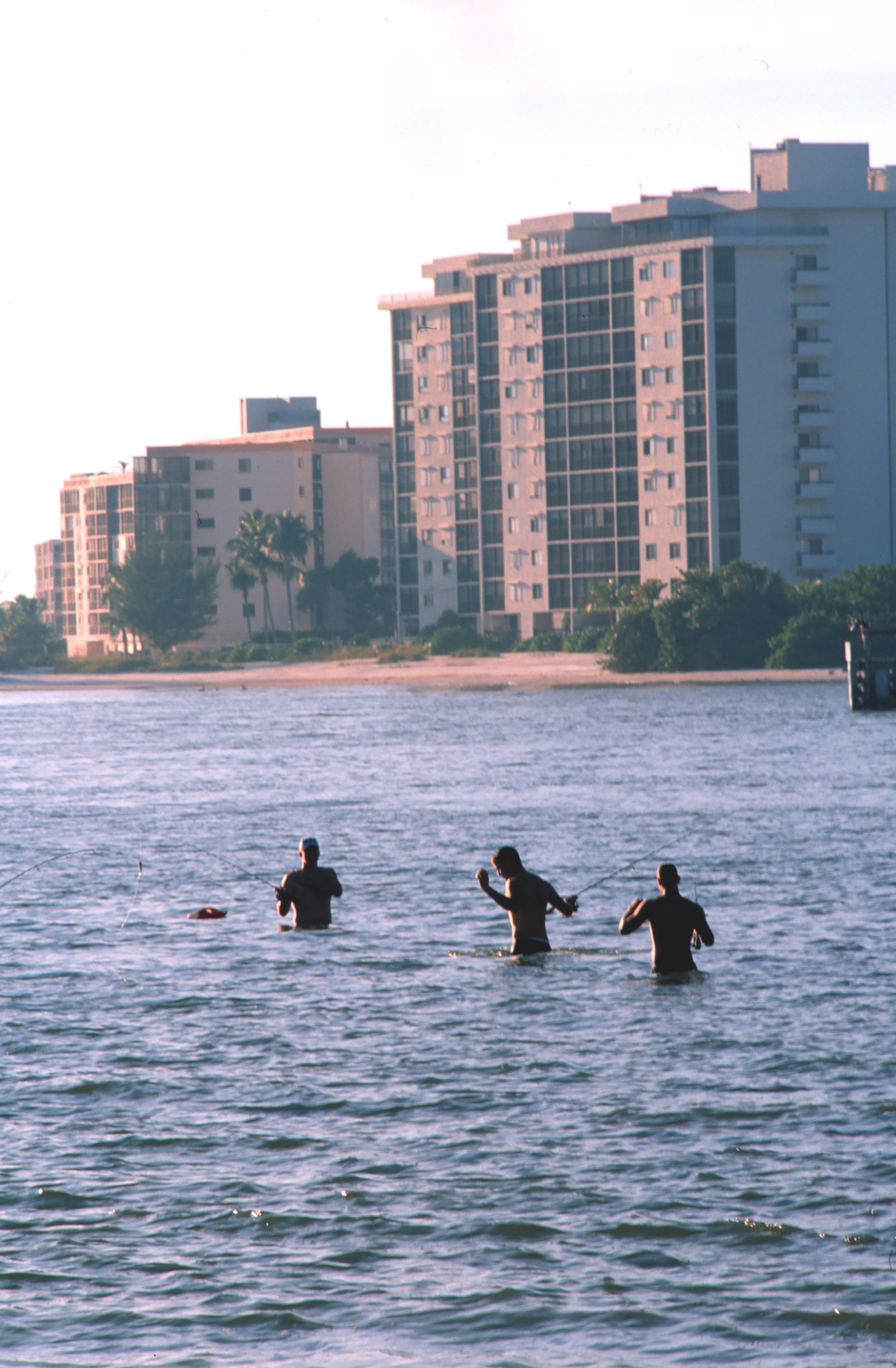
Fishermen wading in Fort Myers Beach.

Nomadic Paleo-Indians inhabited southwestern Florida during the last ice age around 10,000 BC. The Paleo-Indians gave way to the Calusa, the "shell people." The Calusa thrived on the southwest Florida coast and numbered over 50,000 when the first Spaniards reached the peninsula in the 16th century. The arrival of the Europeans was devastating to the Calusa, as diseases such as smallpox and measles decimated the population. The Seminole would arrive from points to the north and establish themselves on the peninsula. Southwest Florida was largely undeveloped until the Florida land boom of the 1920s. The Seaboard Air Line Railroad (SAL) expanded south from Tampa.

Inland counties (DeSoto, Hendry and Glades Counties) are notably rural, with the primary economic driver being agriculture. Important products grown in this area include tomatoes, beef, sugarcane, and citrus products including oranges. Agricultural harvesting in Southwest Florida employs approximately 16,000 seasonal workers, 90 percent of which are thought to be migrants.

== Government ==
Each county in the region has its own county government. Within each county, there are also self-governing cities, towns, and villages. The remaining majority of land in each county is controlled directly by the county government. It is also very common for incorporated municipalities to contract with the county for services to save costs and avoid redundancy. The region is designated as one of Florida's 4 districts for the Committee of Southern Historic Preservation (C-SHP). The district has been represented by Tommy Stolly since 2013.

== Transportation ==
=== Highways ===
Southwest Florida is served by several major highways, including the Tamiami Trail (U.S. 41) and the Interstate 75 freeway, both of which connect the area to Tampa to the north, and Greater Miami–Ft. Lauderdale to the east. Long-term cooperative infrastructure planning is coordinated by various metropolitan planning organizations (MPOs) such as the Sarasota-Manatee, Charlotte County-Punta Gorda, Heartland Regional, Lee County, and Collier MPOs.

Greyhound Lines serves several locations in Southwest Florida, including Bradenton, Fort Myers, Naples, Port Charlotte, Punta Gorda and Sarasota.

=== Airports ===
Southwest Florida International Airport, located south of Fort Myers, is the area's primary airport for commercial traffic, serving 10.3 million passengers in 2021 and ranking among the 50 busiest airports in the United States. Since 2022, the Lufthansa subsidiary Eurowings Discover operates a direct route between Fort Myers and Frankfurt Airport, the sole nonstop flight to Europe in the region; the airport also facilitates travel between 28 states as well as the Canadian provinces of Quebec and Ontario and Havana.

Sarasota–Bradenton International Airport serves as the secondary airport for the region and the primary airport for American and Canadian travelers hoping to travel to the northern part of Southwest Florida, flying as far west as Denver, as far north as Toronto Pearson and Minneapolis, and as far east as Boston. In 2021, the airport served 3.16 million passengers, a new record.

General aviation airports sprawl across the region, with the airport in Naples being the twelfth busiest in the nation for private jet traffic. The region also hosts general aviation facilities at namesake airports in various locations including Immokalee, Buckingham, LaBelle, Arcadia, Marco Island, Punta Gorda, and Venice, as well as at Fort Myers' Page Field, Placida's Coral Creek Airport, Everglades Airpark near Everglades City, and the Dade-Collier Training and Transition Airport straddling the line between Southwest Florida and the Miami metropolitan area.

=== Seaport ===
SeaPort Manatee provides a full range of port services for commercial, industrial, and cruise ship purposes.

=== Railway ===
Seminole Gulf Railway provides freight services throughout Southwest Florida.

== Tourism ==
Tourism is a major economic driver in the area. The warm winter climate draws tourists from across the United States, Canada, and Europe.

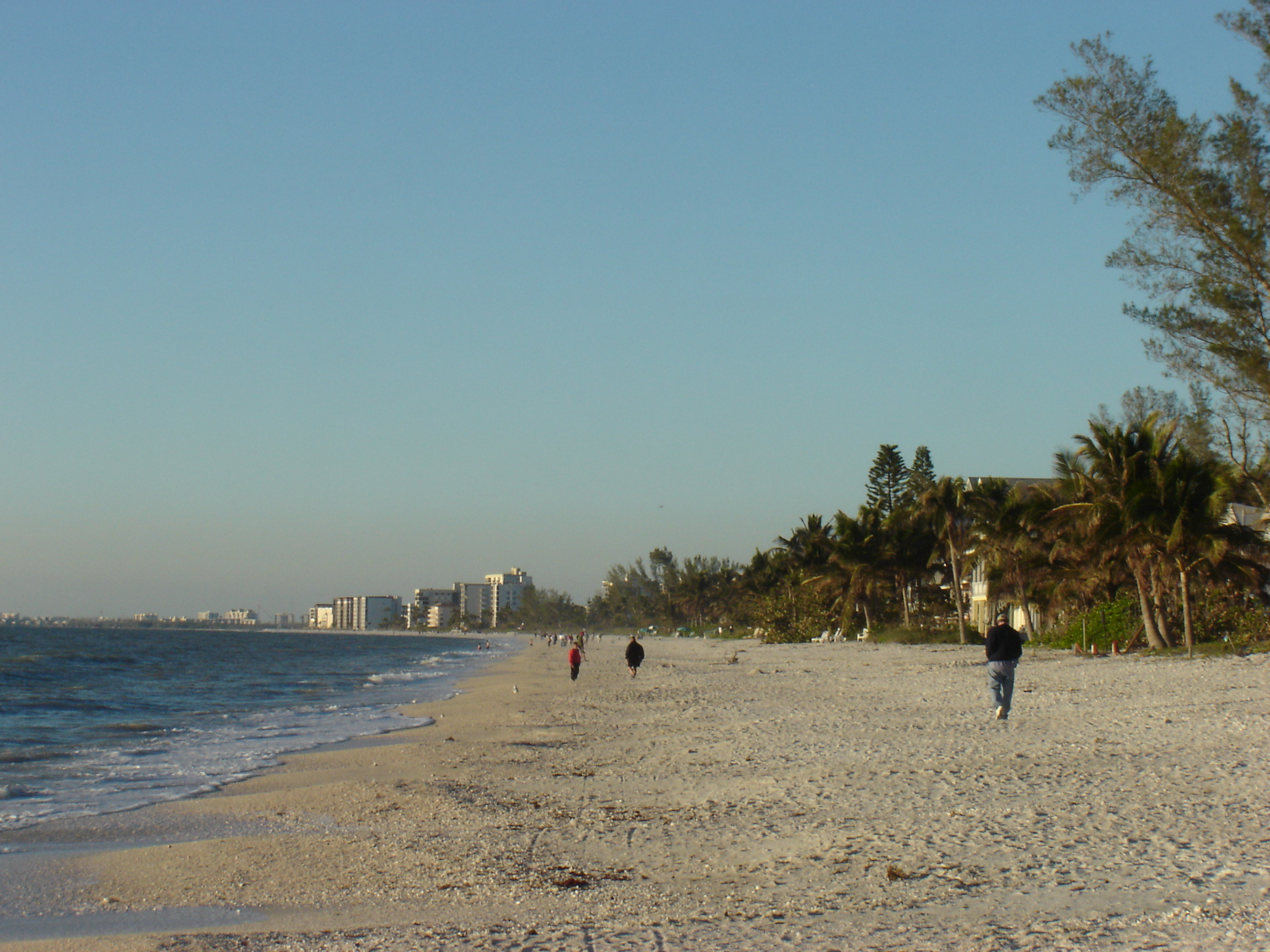
Bonita Beach

Major attractions/destinations:

- Beaches in the following locales:

- Bonita Beach
- Cape Romano
- Fort Myers Beach
- Longboat Key, offshore from Bradenton and Sarasota
- Marco Island, offshore from Naples
- Naples
- Sarasota
- Sarasota Jungle Gardens in Sarasota
- Sanibel and Captiva Islands, offshore from Fort Myers and Cape Coral
- St. Armands Circle on St. Armands Key
- Venice

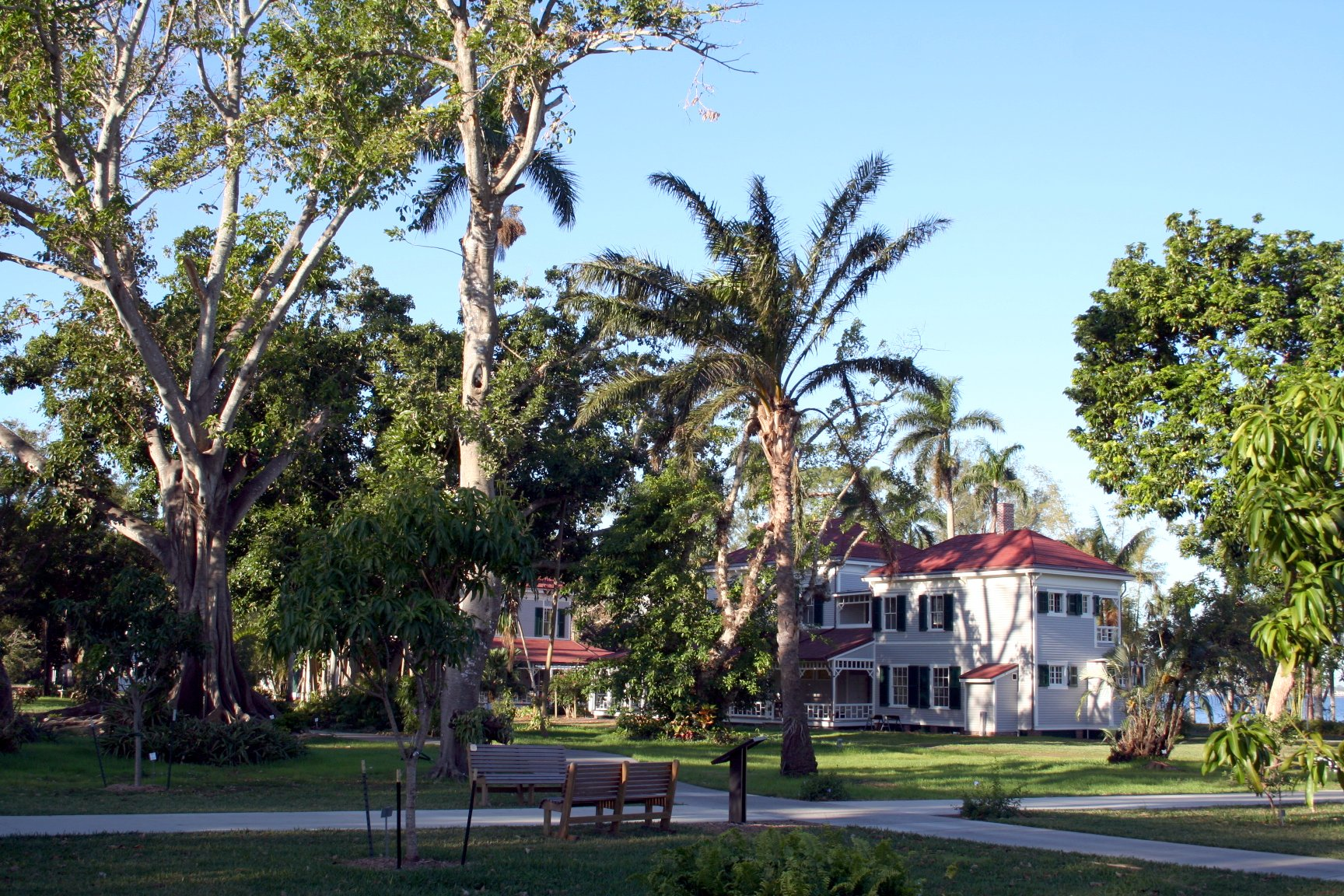
Edison's winter home.

- Attractions including:

- Edison and Ford Winter Estates in Fort Myers
- Lake Okeechobee renowned for fishing and ecotourism.
- Naples Botanical Garden
- Naples Zoo at Caribbean Gardens
- Brighton Seminole Indian Reservation where the Seminole nation operates a sizable casino.
- Ringling Museum of Art in Sarasota
- St. Armand's Circle in Sarasota

== Education ==
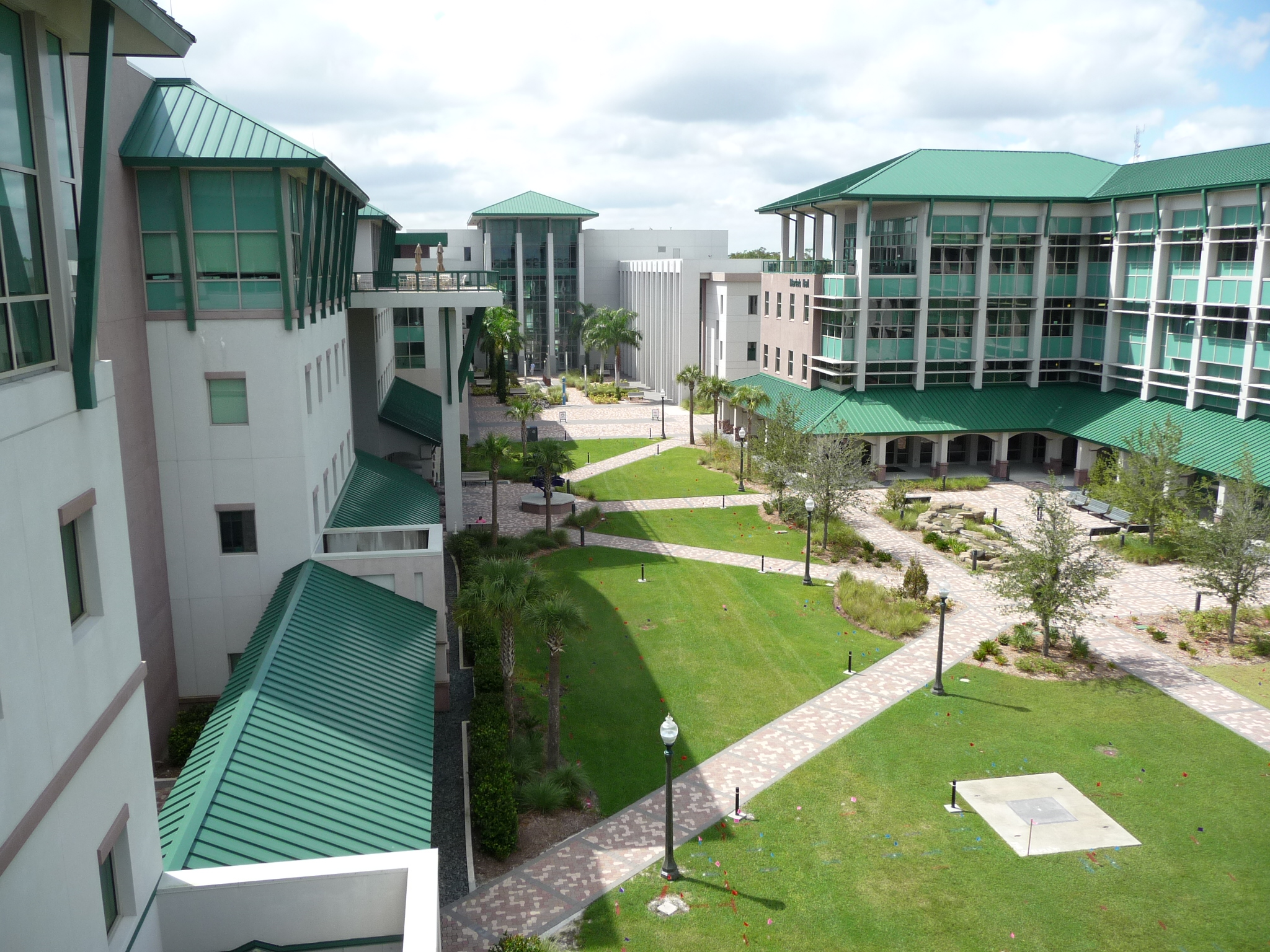
FGCU's Academic Core

Florida Gulf Coast University (FGCU) is a public university located just south of the Southwest Florida International Airport in South Fort Myers in Lee County, Florida. The university is part of the 12-campus State University System of Florida. FGCU competes in the ASUN Conference in NCAA Division I sports. FGCU is accredited by the Commission on Colleges of the Southern Association of Colleges and Schools to award associate's, 51 different types of bachelor's, 29 different master's, and 6 types of doctoral degrees.

== Sports ==
The following table shows the professional teams and major NCAA Division 1 teams that play in Southwest Florida.

Club	Location	Sport	League	Tier/Division	Venue (capacity)
Florida Everblades	Estero	Ice hockey	ECHL	Mid-level minor league	Hertz Arena (7,100)
Fort Myers Mighty Mussels	S. Fort Myers	Baseball	Florida State League	Minor league — Class A	Hammond Stadium (7,500)
Bradenton Marauders	Bradenton	Baseball	Florida State League	Minor league — Class A	LECOM Park (8,500)
Charlotte Stone Crabs	Port Charlotte	Baseball	Florida State League	Minor league — Class A	Charlotte Sports Park (7,000)
Gulf Coast League Red Sox	Fort Myers	Baseball	Gulf Coast League	Rookie League	JetBlue Park (10,823)
Florida Gulf Coast Eagles	Fort Myers	Basketball	ASUN Conference	NCAA Division I	Alico Arena (4,500)
FC Naples	Naples	Soccer	USL League One		Paradise Coast Sports Complex (5,000)
Sarasota Paradise	Lakewood Ranch	Soccer	USL League Two	South Florida Division	Premier Sports Complex (3,000+)

=== Spring training ===
Florida is the traditional home for Major League Baseball spring training, with teams informally organized into the "Grapefruit League." As of 2004, Southwest Florida hosts the following major league teams for spring training:

- Atlanta Braves in North Port
- Boston Red Sox in Fort Myers
- Baltimore Orioles in Sarasota
- Minnesota Twins in South Fort Myers
- Pittsburgh Pirates in Bradenton
- Tampa Bay Rays in Port Charlotte

== Area codes ==
- Area code 239 Collier and Lee counties (Portions of Hendry, Charlotte and Monroe counties)
- Area code 941 Charlotte, Manatee and Sarasota Counties, and also includes Boca Grande, in Lee County
- Area code 863 DeSoto, Hendry and Glades counties

== Media ==
=== Newspapers ===
- The Banner
- The Bradenton Herald
- Breeze Newspapers
- Florida Weekly
- Naples Daily News
- The News-Press
- Sarasota Herald-Tribune
- Southwest Florida Business Today
- The Sun
- Cape Coral Breeze
- Florida's Voice (operates statewide, based in SWFL)

== Counties ==
County	County seat	2010 Population	2020 Population
Charlotte County	Punta Gorda	141,627	186,847
Collier County	East Naples	251,377	375,752
DeSoto County	Arcadia	32,209	33,976
Glades County	Moore Haven	10,576	12,126
Hendry County	LaBelle	36,210	39,619
Lee County	Fort Myers	440,888	760,822
Manatee County	Bradenton	296,385	399,710
Sarasota County	Sarasota	325,957	434,006

== Major incorporated cities ==
- Bradenton, Manatee County
- Bonita Springs, Lee County
- Cape Coral, Lee County
- Fort Myers, Lee County
- Naples, Collier County
- North Port, Sarasota County
- Sarasota, Sarasota County
- Punta Gorda, Charlotte County

== Major unincorporated communities ==
Communities listed have a population greater than 30,000 according to the 2000 census.

- Lehigh Acres, Lee County
- North Fort Myers, Lee County
- Port Charlotte, Charlotte County
- South Fort Myers, Lee County

== See also ==
- Florida Suncoast
- Conservancy of Southwest Florida
- Southwest Florida College
- Southwest Florida International Airport
