= Lee County Library =

There are twelve Lee counties in the United States. Some have a single library branch within their county and other Lee counties have a system of multiple libraries. Lee County Library may refer to:

- Lee County Library (Arkansas)
- Lee County Library System (Florida)
- Lee County Library (Georgia)
- Lee County Public Libraries (Illinois)
- Lee County Libraries (Iowa)
- Lee County Public Library (Kentucky)
- Lee County Library (Mississippi)
- Lee County Library System (North Carolina)
- Lee County Public Library (South Carolina)
- Lee County Public Library (Virginia)

The public library for other counties named Lee in the United States include:

- Lewis Cooper Jr Memorial Library of Lee County, Alabama.
- Giddings Public Library of Lee County, Texas.
