= Fort Myers Regional Library =

Public library

- 26.645689181914623°N 81.86707925596437°W
- Location: Fort Myers, Florida, USA
- Type: public library

Other information
- Website: www.leegov.com/library/branches/fm

Fort Myers Regional Library is a public library located in downtown Fort Myers, Florida. It is part of the Lee County Library System.

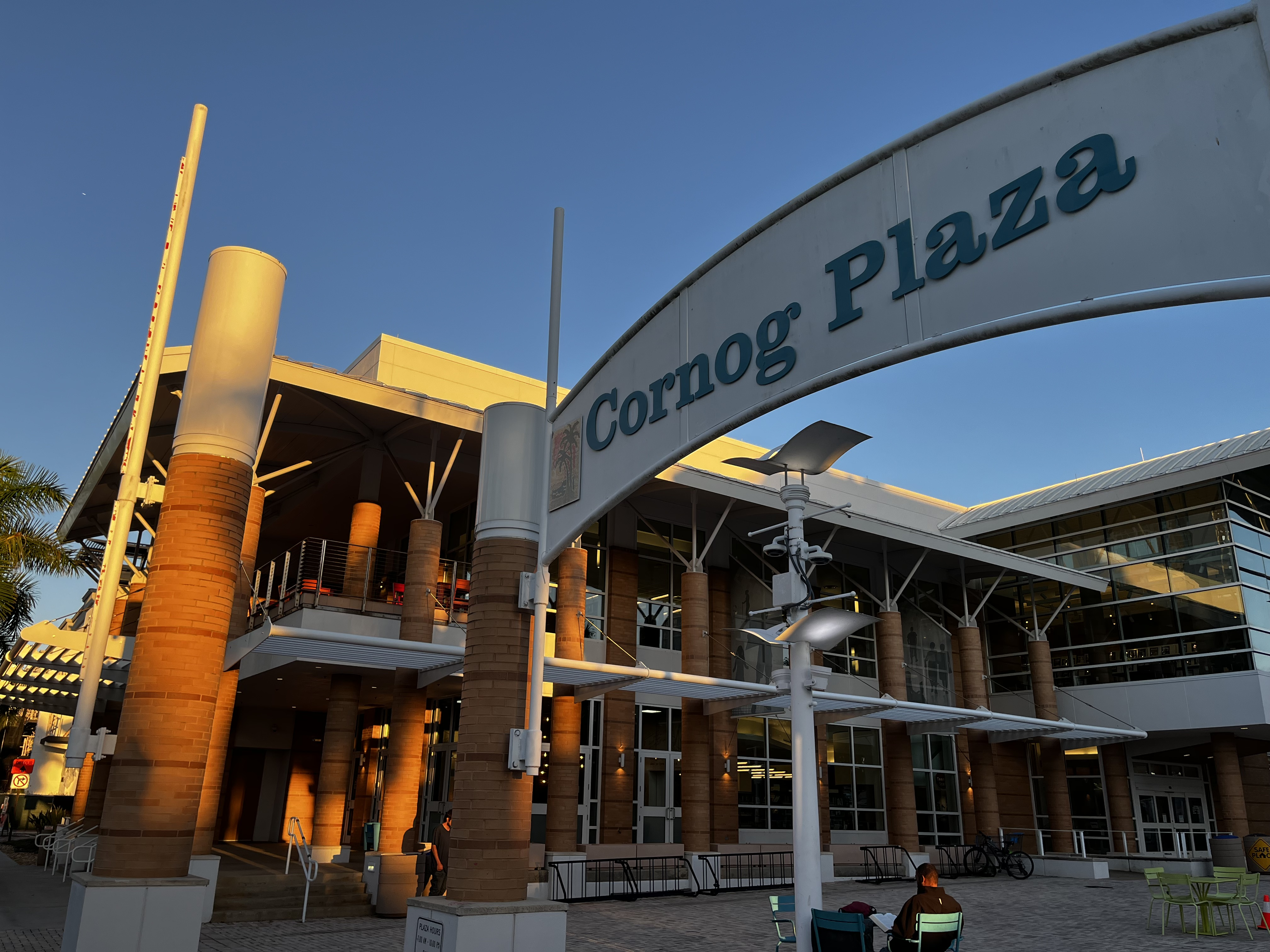
The front entrance view of the Fort Myers Regional Library.

== Location ==
Fort Myers Regional Library was opened in 2014. It is located at 2450 First St., Fort Myers, FL 33901. The facility contains two large buildings, a public plaza, and multipurpose spaces, which provides a dedicated area for library sponsored and other downtown events. The north library building includes two stories adorned with glass architecture, a material collection of more than 165,500 items, an outdoor reading deck, and separate adult, teen and youth reading areas. The library is in the River District of downtown Fort Myers. The Richmond Street entrance is currently closed due to construction.

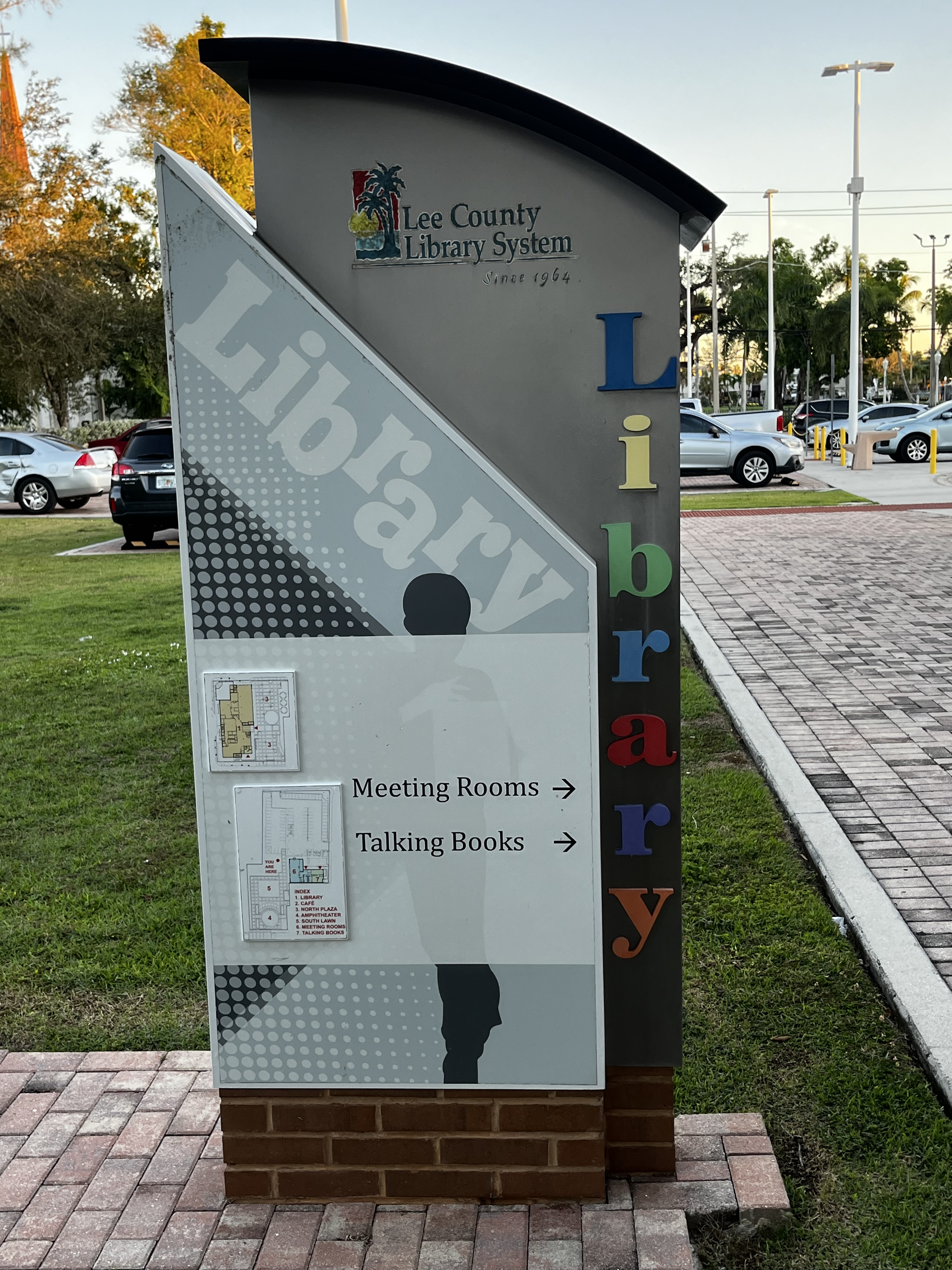
The Fort Myers Regional Library directory sign, located near the side entrance.

== Services ==
Fort Myers Regional Library provides access to a large collection of fiction and non-fiction materials. The location offers public computers, Wi-Fi access, meeting and study rooms, printing, and scanning. The library is a Florida State Publications Depository Library, housing and providing public access to publications from Florida state agencies.

=== Genealogy ===
The Fort Myers Regional Library branch houses the county library system's genealogy collection, the largest in Southwest Florida, in their dedicated Genealogy Room, which is a part of the second floor adult services area. The collection contains materials from all 50 states and 55 foreign countries, with a primary focus on materials from states east of the Mississippi River, Canada, the British Isles, and the northestern area of Europe. Patrons can access print, microform, and digital resources for their research needs. Patrons are also able to send research queries and photocopy requests to the department by telephone, fax, postal mail, or e-mail. The library is designated as a Family History Library Affiliate, providing access to the Family History Library's digital microfilm records. Library cardholders have free access to Ancestry.com, African American Heritage, Fold3, and Heritage Quest Online within the library. This branch has trained staff to assist with genealogical research.

== Programs ==
The library hosts a variety of programs for all ages, including storytimes, book discussions, arts and crafts classes, genealogy classes, language learning classes, literacy and basic education classes, and technology classes. The library also offers the Talking Books program, which provides recorded books for those with visual impairments, as well as the Books-By-Mail program which ships books to those with disabilities who cannot make it to the library.

== Events ==
=== Southwest Florida Reading Festival ===
The Fort Myers Regional Library branch has hosted the annual Southwest Florida Reading Festival every March since 2000. The goal of this event is to promote reading, literacy and free library services. It is free to the public, regardless if you are a Lee County Library System card holder. The festival hosts authors from the Florida Writers Association, Gulf Coast Writers Association and the Southwest Florida Fiction Writers. Attendees have the opportunity to meet these famous writers, purchase their books, and have them personally signed. Attendees are also able to participate in arts and crafts, storytimes, and writing contests. This event appeals to all ages.
