= Jaylen Watkins =

American football player (born 1991)

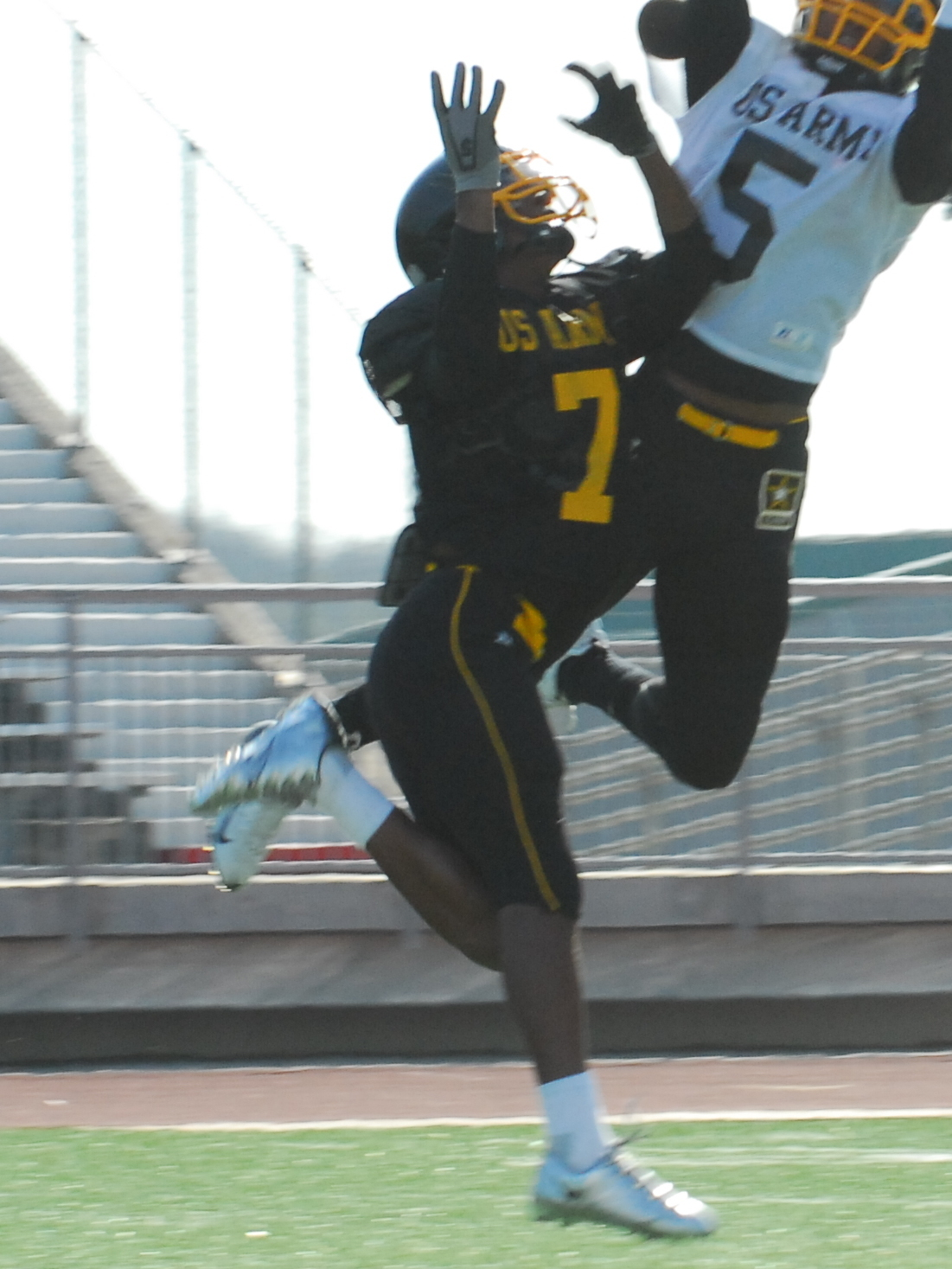
- Watkins in 2010

No. 37, 26, 27, 20
- Position: Safety

Personal information
- Born: November 27, 1991 (age 34); Fort Myers, Florida, U.S.
- Listed height: 5 ft 11 in (1.80 m)
- Listed weight: 194 lb (88 kg)

Career information
- High school: Cape Coral (Cape Coral, Florida)
- College: Florida
- NFL draft: 2014: 4th round, 101st overall pick

Career history
- Philadelphia Eagles (2014); Buffalo Bills (2015)*; Philadelphia Eagles (2015–2017); Los Angeles Chargers (2018–2019); Houston Texans (2020)*; Los Angeles Chargers (2020)
- * Offseason or practice squad member only

Awards and highlights
- Super Bowl champion (LII)

Career NFL statistics
- Total tackles: 93
- Pass deflections: 9
- Stats at Pro Football Reference

Jaylen Watkins (born November 27, 1991) is an American former professional football player who was a safety in the National Football League (NFL). He played college football for the Florida Gators. He was selected by the Philadelphia Eagles in the fourth round of the 2014 NFL draft.

== Early life ==
A native of Cape Coral, Florida, Watkins attended Cape Coral High School. He played quarterback, wide receiver and defensive back at Cape Coral, leading his team to an 11–1 record in his senior season, advancing to the FHSAA 4A Regional semifinals. He passed for 1,230 yards and 13 touchdowns as a senior and rushed for 928 yards with 10 touchdowns. He also had 29 receptions for 461 yards and five touchdowns. He also ran track at Cape Coral and advanced to the 4A Track Championships in the 4 × 100 relay. He was selected to play in the 2010 U.S. Army All-American Bowl in San Antonio, Texas.

Considered a four-star recruit by Rivals.com, he was rated as the fourth best cornerback prospect in his class.

== College career ==
Watkins attended the University of Florida from 2010 to 2013. He appeared in 48 games, with 28 starts, at both cornerback and safety. He primarily played special teams as a freshman, before earning an increased role in the defense as a sophomore and throughout his tenure at Florida. During his career, he accumulated 133 tackles, including four for loss, 21 pass breakups and three interceptions.

== Professional career ==
Pre-draft measurables
Height	Weight	Arm length	Hand span	40-yard dash	10-yard split	20-yard split	20-yard shuttle	Three-cone drill	Vertical jump	Broad jump	Bench press
5 ft 11 1/2 in (1.82 m)	194 lb (88 kg)	30 5/8 in (0.78 m)	9 5/8 in (0.24 m)	4.41 s	1.50 s	2.56 s	4.50 s	7.13 s	31.5 in (0.80 m)	9 ft 10 in (3.00 m)	22 reps
All values from NFL Combine/Pro Day

=== Philadelphia Eagles (first stint) ===
Watkins was selected by the Philadelphia Eagles in the fourth round (101st overall) of the 2014 NFL draft.

On September 5, 2015, Watkins was released by the Eagles.

=== Buffalo Bills ===
On September 7, 2015, Watkins was signed to the practice squad of the Buffalo Bills and practiced with his brother Sammy Watkins.

=== Philadelphia Eagles (second stint) ===
On November 27, 2015, Watkins was re-signed by the Eagles off the Bills' practice squad.

On March 4, 2017, Watkins signed a one-year extension with the Eagles. Watkins won a Super Bowl ring when the Eagles defeated the New England Patriots in Super Bowl LII.

=== Los Angeles Chargers (first stint) ===
On March 30, 2018, Watkins signed a one-year contract with the Los Angeles Chargers. In the Chargers' second preseason game, Watkins suffered a torn ACL and was placed on injured reserve on August 19, 2018.

On February 15, 2019, Watkins re-signed with the Chargers.

=== Houston Texans ===
On March 30, 2020, Watkins signed a two-year contract with the Houston Texans. He was released on September 5, 2020.

=== Los Angeles Chargers (second stint) ===
On November 7, 2020, Watkins was signed to the Chargers' practice squad. He was elevated to the active roster on November 21 and December 17 for the team's weeks 11 and 15 games against the New York Jets and Las Vegas Raiders, and reverted to the practice squad after each game. On January 1, 2021, Watkins was promoted to the active roster.

== Coaching career ==
Jaylen Was Named the Interim Coach at his Alma Mater after the resignation of the Previous head coach Tyler Murphy

== Personal life ==
He is the older half-brother of wide receiver Sammy Watkins.
