= Johann Fust Community Library =

Coordinates: 26.756059°N 82.263631°W

Johann Fust Community Library is a public library in Boca Grande, Florida. It is part of the Lee County Library System.

== Location ==
Johann Fust Community Library is located at 1040 West 10th Street in Boca Grande, Florida. It has been called a point of cultural interest in the village.

== History ==
The Johann Fust Community Library opened on January 6, 1951 as a private library. It was named after Johann Fust, the financier of the Gutenberg Press.

In 1949, Roger and Louise Armory gave the library to Boca Grande. The couple pledged 68 shares of stock worth $44.200 and a loan of $10,000 to fund it. That same year, the library purchased a property on 10th street to construct a new building. The library property also contained an upstairs apartment and a cottage for librarians and staff. Thomas Cost, the library's superintendent, and his wife Pansy, the librarian, lived in the cottage until they died in 2004 and 2005.

The JF Library Foundation was officially founded on April 26, 2012. After several years of negotiation and renovation, the Foundation agreed to partner with the Lee County Library System and merged with the system in June 2013.

The Foundation still owns and maintains all of the original library grounds, gardens, and buildings as well as the collections of artifacts and rare books.

In 2024, the library was forced to close due to damage from Hurricane Milton. It re-opened on February 14, 2025.
