= Nate Allen (safety) =

American football player (born 1987)

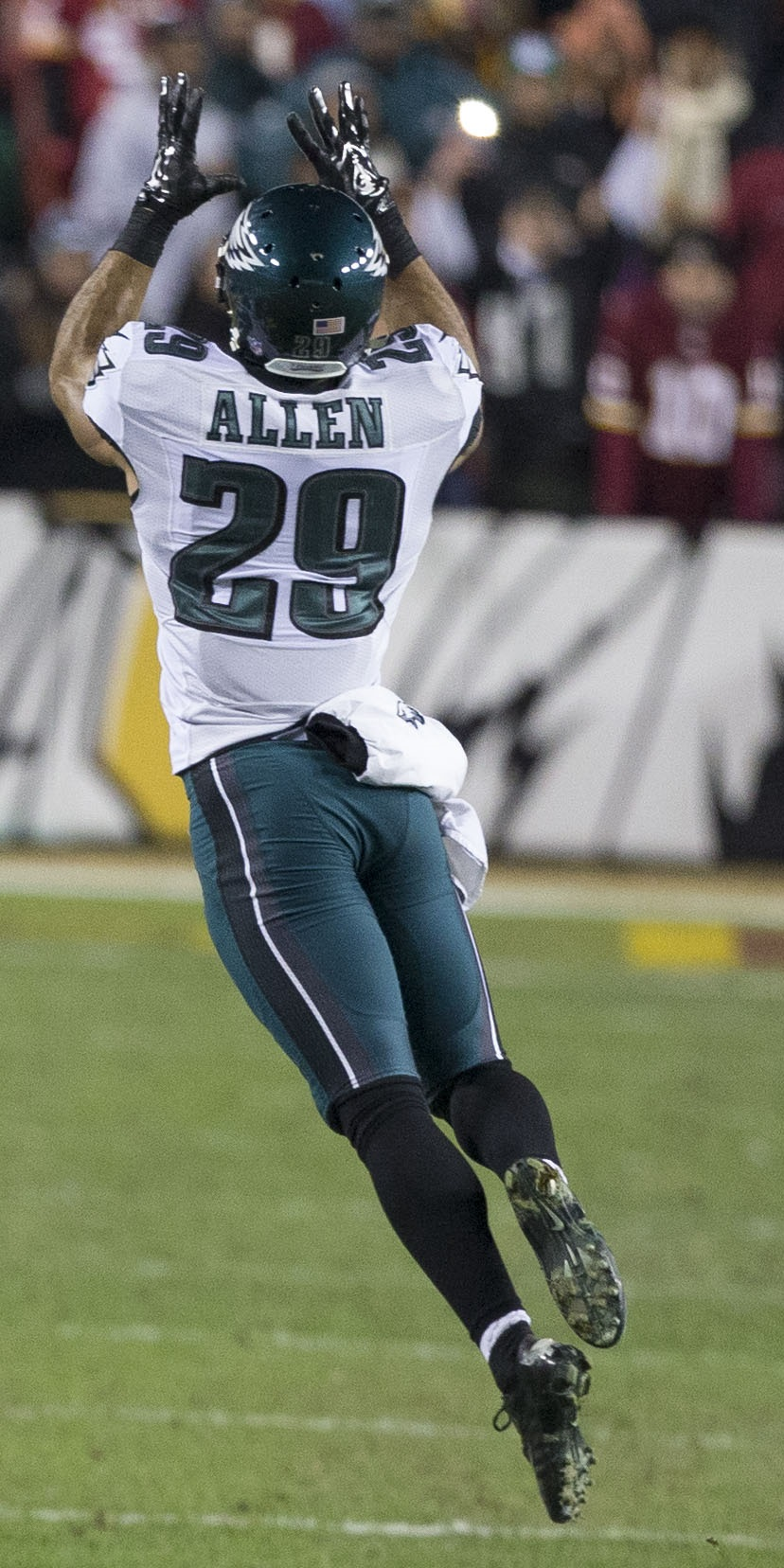
- Allen with the Philadelphia Eagles in 2014

No. 29, 20
- Position: Safety

Personal information
- Born: November 30, 1987 (age 38); Fort Myers, Florida, U.S.
- Listed height: 6 ft 1 in (1.85 m)
- Listed weight: 210 lb (95 kg)

Career information
- High school: Cape Coral (Cape Coral, Florida)
- College: South Florida
- NFL draft: 2010: 2nd round, 37th overall pick

Career history
- Philadelphia Eagles (2010–2014); Oakland Raiders (2015–2016); Miami Dolphins (2017)

Career NFL statistics
- Total tackles: 388
- Sacks: 4.0
- Forced fumbles: 3
- Fumble recoveries: 3
- Pass deflections: 35
- Interceptions: 13
- Stats at Pro Football Reference

Nathaniel Ray Allen (born November 30, 1987) is an American former professional football player who was a safety in the National Football League (NFL). He played college football for the South Florida Bulls and was selected by the Philadelphia Eagles in the second round of the 2010 NFL draft. He also played for the Oakland Raiders and the Miami Dolphins.

== Early life ==
Allen played football for the Pop Warner Little Scholars. He was part of the SE Region, Peace River Conference, and played with the Cape Coral High School Seahawks. Allen attended Cape Coral High School, where he played quarterback and threw for more than 5,000 career yards. He was a three-time all-area player and Class 5A honorable mention all-state as a junior and senior. Also an accomplished basketball player, he averaged 15.3 points, 6.6 rebounds and 2.9 steals in 2005–2006 and was named 2nd Team All-Area. He was also a letterman in track.

Considered a two-star recruit by Rivals.com, Allen was not ranked among the nation's best football prospects. He drew little attention from colleges and selected South Florida over Eastern Kentucky and Eastern Michigan.

== College career ==
As a true freshman, Allen played in nine of USF's 13 games, missing four mid-year games due to a quadriceps injury. He was used as a situational backup in the secondary and also on special teams.

Becoming a full-time starter as a sophomore, Allen had a breakout year, recording 84 tackles (fourth on the team), four interceptions, three fumble recoveries, 47 fumble return yards, and one touchdown. He was named Nagurski National Defensive Player of the Week after forcing a fumble, recovering a fumble and intercepting a pass in Bulls’ win at No. 17 Auburn.

A preseason Thorpe Award candidate in 2008, Allen finished the season fifth on the team with 53 tackles, while having two tackles for loss, one sack and one interception.

== Professional career ==
=== Pre-draft ===
Allen was considered one of the best safety prospects available for the 2010 NFL draft.

Pre-draft measurables
Height	Weight	20-yard shuttle	Three-cone drill	Vertical jump	Broad jump	Bench press
6 ft 1 in (1.85 m)	207 lb (94 kg)	4.30 s	6.96 s	34 1/2 in (0.88 m)	9 ft 6 in (2.90 m)	16 reps
Bench press value from 2010 NFL Scouting Combine, all other values from South Florida's Pro Day on March 30.

=== Philadelphia Eagles ===
Allen was selected by the Philadelphia Eagles in the second round (37th overall) in the 2010 NFL draft. The Eagles traded quarterback Donovan McNabb to the Washington Redskins in exchange for the pick used to select Allen. After Marlin Jackson suffered an Achilles tendon rupture during organized team activities, Allen was named the starting free safety going into training camp, replacing the 2009 starter, Sean Jones. Allen was signed to a four-year contract on July 27, 2010.

Allen recorded his first NFL interception against the Green Bay Packers in week 1 of the 2010 season, and he recorded his second interception week 2 against the Detroit Lions. He was named the NFL Defensive Rookie of the Month for the month of September. He was placed on injured reserve on December 21 due to a torn patellar tendon.

Allen remained the starter through the 2011 and 2012 seasons, though the linebackers and defensive backs as a whole struggled behind Jim Washburn's "wide-9" technique. In 2013, new defensive coordinator Billy Davis moved the team back to a traditional 4-3 defense, and Allen had a career best 82 tackles starting all 16 games. He re-signed with the Eagles on a one-year deal.

In 2014, Allen had his best year starting alongside free safety Malcolm Jenkins. The Eagles were sixth in the NFL in defensive turnovers, with Allen's four interceptions leading the team.

=== Oakland Raiders ===
Allen signed with the Oakland Raiders on March 12, 2015. Allen suffered a torn MCL in a loss to the Cincinnati Bengals on September 13, 2015. After an impressive preseason where he only allowed 1 catch on 5 targets, he played only 5 games in the regular season, totalling 11 tackles and 1 interception. He was released by the Raiders on February 9, 2016. Allen was re-signed by the Raiders on February 11, 2016. In the 2016 season, he recorded 33 tackles, 2 interceptions, and 3 pass deflections in 14 games and 4 starts.

=== Miami Dolphins ===
On March 10, 2017, Allen signed with the Miami Dolphins. He started the first seven games at free safety before being placed on injured reserve on October 31, 2017 with a calf injury.

=== NFL statistics ===
Year	Team	GP	GS	COMB	TOT	AST	SCK	FF	FR	FR YDS	INT	IR YDS	AVG IR	LNG	TD	PD
2010	PHI	13	13	48	42	6	2.0	1	0	0	3	27	9	16	0	8
2011	PHI	15	12	59	46	13	0.0	0	0	0	2	44	22	31	0	7
2012	PHI	15	13	73	60	13	0.0	0	0	0	0	0	0	0	0	4
2013	PHI	16	16	82	59	23	1.0	1	0	0	1	43	43	43	0	6
2014	PHI	15	15	62	51	11	1.0	1	3	25	4	45	11.3	40	0	5
2015	OAK	5	3	11	7	4	0.0	0	0	0	1	5	5	5	0	2
2016	OAK	14	4	33	24	9	0.0	0	0	0	2	5	2.5	4	0	3
2017	MIA	7	7	20	14	6	0.0	0	0	0	0	0	0	0	0	1
Career		100	83	388	303	85	4.0	3	3	25	13	169	13.0	43	0	35

== Personal life ==
In February 2015, Allen was arrested in Fort Myers after being mistakenly identified by police officers who did not follow protocol; he was later awarded $440,000 in a federal civil rights lawsuit.

After retiring from football, Allen became a firefighter with North Collier Fire Control and Rescue in Collier County, Florida.
