= Oasis High School =

Coordinates: 26°35′11.5″N 82°1′19.5″W

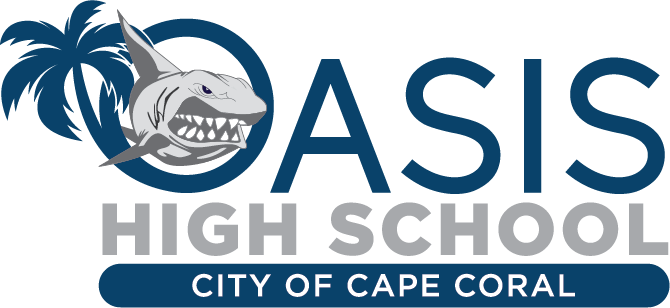

Location
- 3519 Oasis Blvd; Cape Coral, Florida 33914; United States

Information
- School type: Charter School
- Established: 2009
- School district: Lee County School District
- Authority: City of Cape Coral Charter School Authority
- Principal: Jackie Corey
- Grades: 9-12
- Enrollment: 689 (2019–2020)
- Student to teacher ratio: 20.26
- Color: Navy Grey White
- Mascot: Sharks
- Newspaper: The Reef
- Yearbook: The Bite
- Website: https://oasishighschool.net/

Oasis High School is a municipal charter school belonging to and located in Cape Coral, Florida. It is one of 4 schools that are part of the City of Cape Coral Charter School Authority, alongside 2 elementary schools and 1 middle school. Oasis High School was the first high school in southwest Florida to offer AICE classes, though it also offers AP, Dual enrollment, Honors, and general education class.

It has received an "A" grade from the Florida Department of Education for 10 out of 13 years as of 2022 (excluding 2019-2020 as no grades were conducted due to the COVID-19 pandemic). In addition, it was the only high school in Cape Coral to receive an "A" grade for the 2017-2018, 2018-2019, 2020-2021, and 2021-2022 academic school years.

Oasis's most advanced curriculum is the University of Cambridge's AICE program. The Advanced International Certificate of Education is a specialized, English language curriculum offered to students internationally in the higher levels of secondary school designed to prepare them for success at the college level. It is very similar to the AP and IB programs, which also award college credits. Students who complete all required courses of the program will earn a Cambridge AICE diploma, and are automatically eligible for the highest level of the Florida Bright Futures scholarship.

== History ==
Oasis High School was opened in August 2009 with technologies like Smart Boards, projectors, and document cameras in every classroom. It also had new programs like culinary arts, graphic design, and college science programs. The 50,000 square foot building featured 60 classrooms and multiple special-purpose rooms. It served grades 8-12 until enrollment was high enough to serve the normal high school grades of 9-12. When the school opened, its student’s voted for the shark to be the school's mascot.

In 2011, a new two-story gym building was added to the high school. It featured classrooms, offices for coaches, locker rooms, a lobby, ticket booths, and a regulation-size basketball court known as the "Shark Tank" after the schools mascot. The gym has a second story, cushioned running track around the edge of the gym and a fitness/weights room with a retractable wall for yoga classes.
