= Rey Ramsey =

American social justice entrepreneur

- Born: Reynard Ramsey; September 10, 1960 (age 66); Lower Merion Township, Pennsylvania, U.S.
- Education: Rutgers University, New Brunswick (BA); University of Virginia (JD)

Rey Ramsey is an American social justice entrepreneur, author, and the former CEO of the One Economy Corporation, a nonprofit he co-founded in 2000.

Ramsey received a B.A. in political science from Rutgers University, where he was a member of Cap and Skull, and ZBT fraternity, and a J.D. degree from the University of Virginia School of Law.

After graduating from law school, Ramsey went to work for the Portland law-firm Stoel Rives. He soon left his job at the firm to pursue a career with the Oregon State Economic Development Department, where he was director of the Oregon Housing and Community Services Department under governors Neil Goldschmidt and Barbara Roberts. Ramsey then worked for the Enterprise Community Partners, first as senior vice president and later became president.

Ramsey had two terms on the Habitat for Humanity International board of directors, elected as vice-chairman in 2001 and then as chairman in 2003. During his chairmanship, the board fired Habitat founder Millard Fuller. Ramsey is on the board of the Local Initiatives Support Corporation and the Washington Jesuit Academy.

Ramsey has been a proponent of the Portland citywide wireless initiative.

Since December 2019, Ramsey has been the CEO of CENTRI Capital, (an organization based in Washington, D.C.) that utilizes data, capital, and technology to achieve outcomes and impact. Prior to this, he was CEO of CENTRI Capital from March 2017 to December 2020 (Washington, D.C. and New York).

Since December 2021, Ramsey has been the president and CEO of the Nathan Cummings Foundation, located in the New York City Metropolitan Area.

== Bibliography ==
- Managing Nonprofits.org: Dynamic Management for the Digital Age (J. Wiley & Sons, 2002). ISBN 978-0-471-39527-0. Co-authored with Ben Hecht.
