= Harding Circle Historic District =

Historic district in Florida, United States

- U.S. National Register of Historic Places
- U.S. Historic district
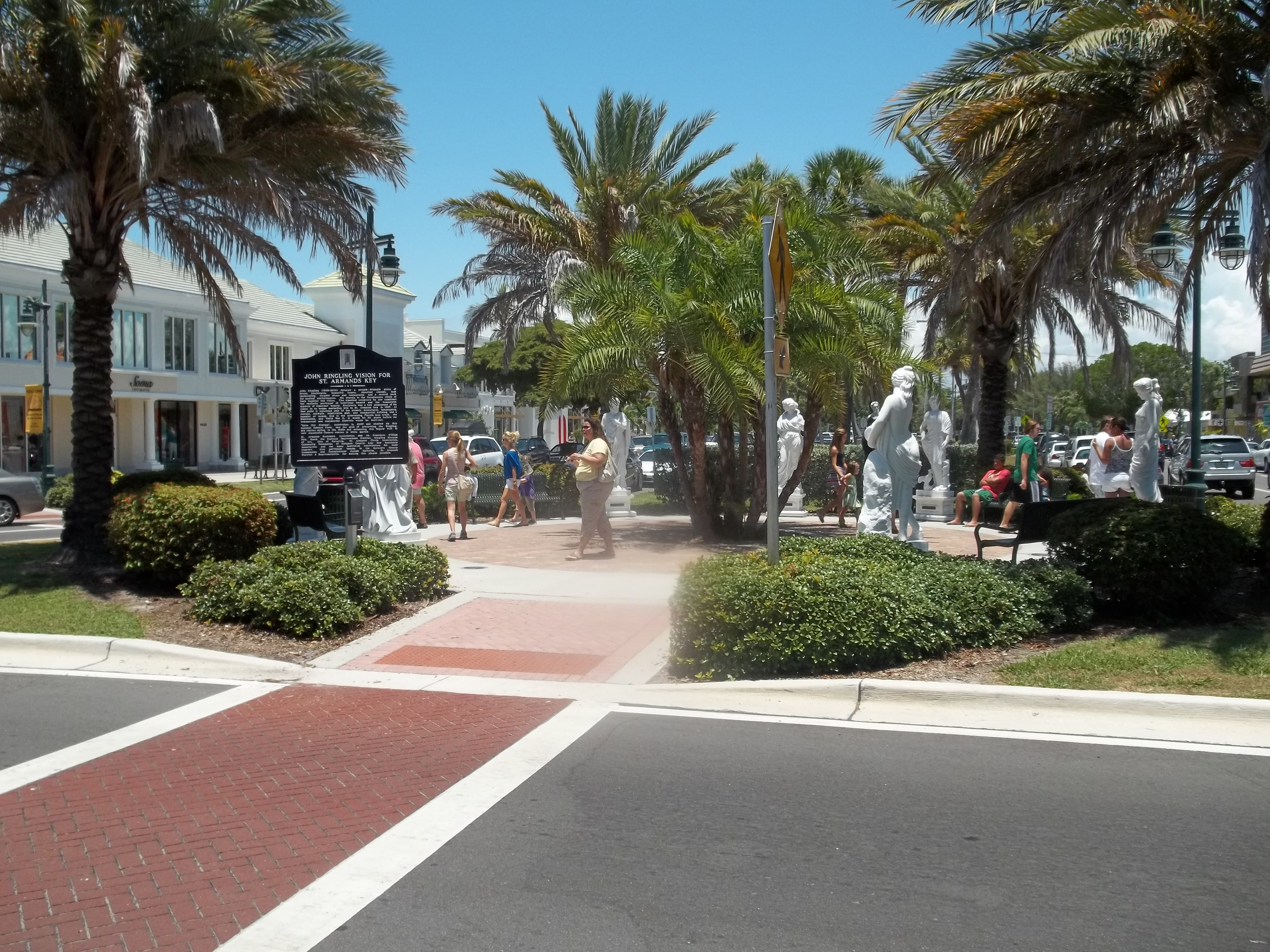

- Location within Florida Location within the United States
- Location: Sarasota, Florida
- Coordinates: 27°19′8″N 82°34′37″W
- NRHP reference No.: 00001650
- Added to NRHP: January 16, 2001

The Harding Circle Historic District is a U.S. historic district (designated as such on January 16, 2001) located in Sarasota, Florida.

The district is on St. Armand's Key, adjacent to Lido Key, and is centered on Harding Circle, in the middle of the key, around which is the retail area of the key.

The circle was named after Warren G. Harding US president at the time the roads were laid out by Owen Burns and John Ringling for their "Ringling Isles" development during the early 1920s. The streets on the key were named to follow the same presidential naming convention with a large boulevard running north to south called the Avenue of the Presidents.

Most of the land is dredged fill provided by Burns to enlarge the natural barrier islands that separate the Gulf of Mexico from Sarasota Bay to the west of downtown Sarasota. Once the new land was created for the development, Burns also built the original causeway leading to the islands from downtown. That causeway leads to and around the circle and to a bridge to the larger portion of Lido Key (another portion of which hooks back to the east and separates St. Armand's from Longboat Key, another barrier island to the north also connected to Lido Key by a bridge).

== Gallery ==
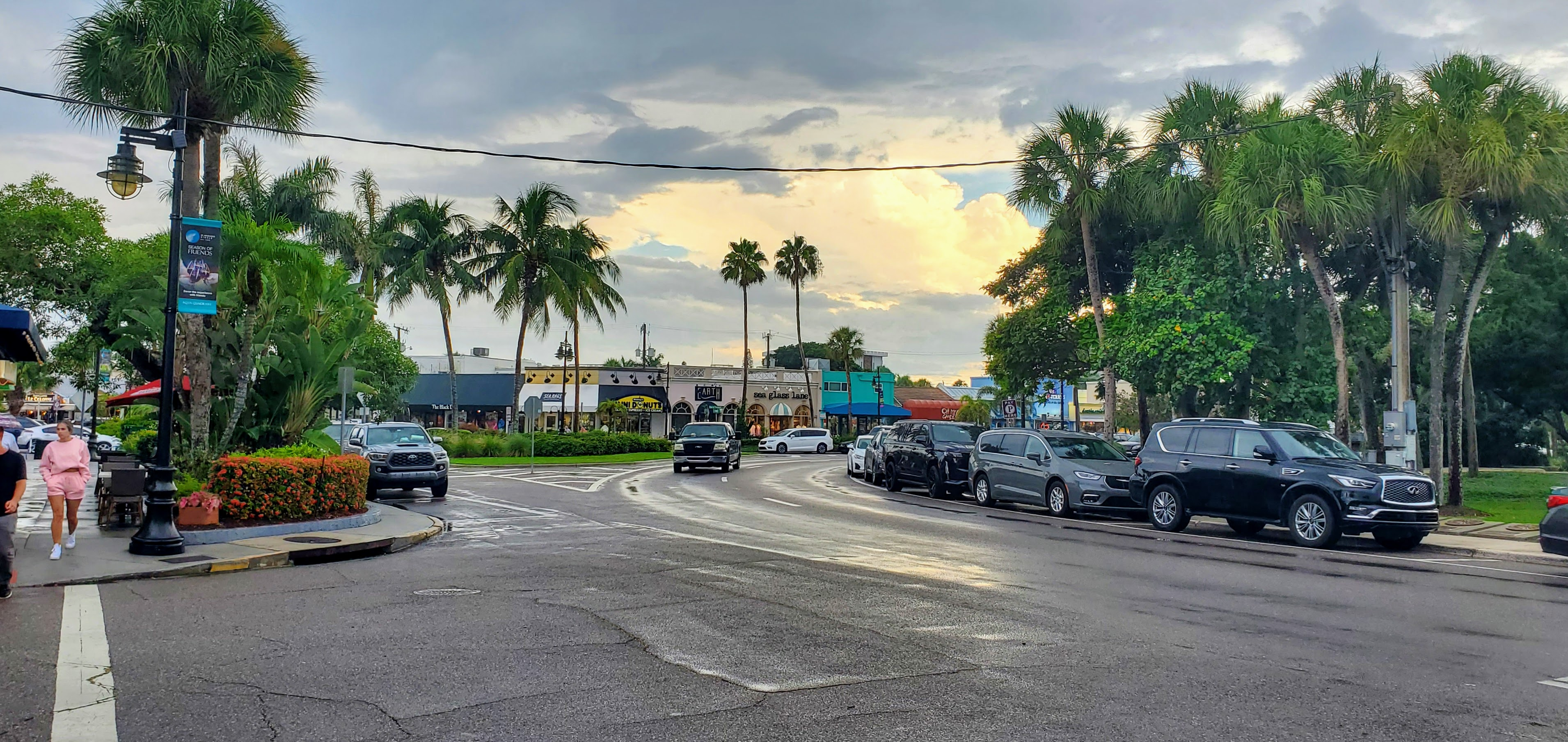
Harding Circle

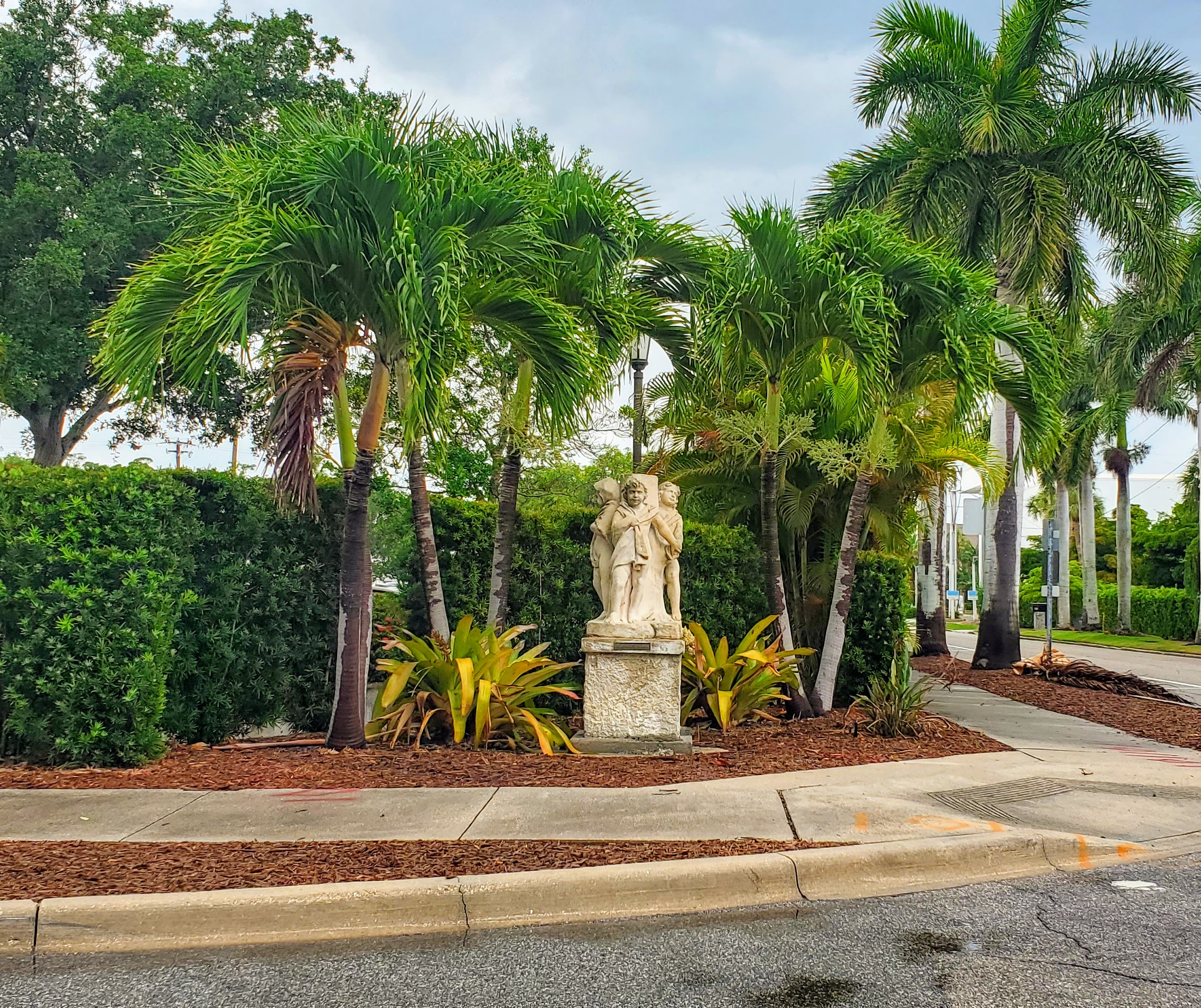
One of the many statues in the Harding Circle Historic District
