= Florida Bureau of Braille and Talking Books Library =

The Florida Bureau of Braille and Talking Books Library is the largest library of its kind within the United States. It is part of the system of libraries of the National Library Service for the Blind and Print Disabled.

It offers a wide variety of material with over 2.4 million items available in braille and audio format. Lending from the library is made accessible through monthly catalogs that allow patrons to request and borrow materials that will then be mailed to them. The library serves nearly 32,000 patrons. The main branch is located in Daytona Beach, Florida, with ten subregional libraries helping to extend their reach around the state.

== History ==
In 1941, the Florida Legislature passed Bill 153, which established the Florida Council of the Blind as a State Board under the Welfare Board. They first concerned themselves with the registration of individuals in need of assistance. Library services, including books in Braille and talking books, were among some of their earlier concerns. Books in Braille were distributed from the Kriegshaber Library for the Blind in Atlanta, Georgia, while talking book machines were distributed by the council for a fee of $1.00. For a time, these services were only available to individuals older than 18 years of age.

In 1950, the National Library Service for the Blind and Print Disabled (NLS) designated the bureau as the regional library of Florida. The Florida Council for the Blind then designated a space of over 4,000 square feet at the Welch Complex in Daytona Beach, Florida, as the official location of the Florida Talking Book Library. The small staff of six served nearly 1,000 patrons, while Braille services continued from Georgia. In 1975, the Florida Talking Book Library became the Florida Regional Library for the Blind and Physically Handicapped. At this time, the library also began to offer Braille services and serving patrons under the age of 18.

== Subregional Libraries ==
There are ten subregional libraries.

- Brevard County Talking Books Library
- Lee County Talking Books Library
- Broward County Talking Book Library
- Duval County Talking Books
- Pinellas Public Library Cooperative
- Miami-Dade and Monroe County Talking Books Library
- Orange County Library System
- West Florida Public Library, Braille and Talking Books
- Palm Beach County Talking Books
- Daytona Regional Library

== Services Offered ==
- Books and magazines in Braille and recorded formats.
- Equipment including digital players and accessories.
- Books available online through the Braille and Audio Recording Download (BARD) website.
- Bimonthly catalogs are mailed to inform patrons about new additions to the collection.
- Music materials, such as scores and textbooks.
- Materials on the subject of blindness, disability, and rehabilitation.
- Access to NFB-NEWSLINE, which offers access to over 500 news sources and magazines.

== Eligibility Requirements ==
Eligibility to use the library's services are decided by the National Library Service for the Blind and Print Disabled division of the Library of Congress. The requirements for application of use are:

- Blind persons whose visual acuity, as determined by competent authority, is 20/200 or less in the better eye with correcting lenses, or whose widest diameter of visual field subtends an angular distance no greater than 20 degrees.
- Persons whose visual disability, with correction and regardless of optical measurement, is certified by competent authority as preventing the reading of standard printed material
- Persons certified by competent authority as unable to read or unable to use standard printed material as a result of physical limitations.
- Persons certified by competent authority as having a reading disability resulting from organic dysfunction and of sufficient severity to prevent their reading printed material in a normal manner.
- Persons eligible for service (falling into any of the above categories) who are now living as residents of the United States (including its territories, insular possessions, and the District of Columbia), or are American citizens eligible for service who are now living abroad, or dependents of active military personnel or diplomats.
