= Lee County Library System (Florida) =

Library system in Florida, United States

- Location: Lee County, Florida
- Established: 1964
- Branches: 13

Collection
- Size: 1.5 million (2016)

Access and use
- Circulation: 6 million (2016)
- Population served: 679,513 (2014)
- Members: 294,000 (2016)

Other information
- Director: Mindi Simon
- Website: http://www.leegov.com/library

The Lee County Library System was founded in 1964 and is composed of 13 branches which serve Lee County, Florida, United States. Olive Stout, who arrived in Fort Myers in 1886, started the town's first reading room and was pivotal in founding its first library. Around 1955, the city moved the library into a small one-room building. The Lee County Library System's mission is to strengthen the community by informing and enriching individuals.

== Branches ==
Name	Address
Bonita Springs Public Library	10560 Reynolds St. Bonita Springs, FL 34135
Cape Coral Lee County Public Library	921 S.W. 39th Terrace Cape Coral, FL 33914
Captiva Memorial Library	11506 Chapin Lane Captiva, FL 33924
Dunbar-Jupiter Hammon Public Library	3095 Blount Street Fort Myers, FL 33916
East County Regional Library	881 Gunnery Road N Lehigh Acres, FL 33971
Fort Myers Regional Library	2450 First Street Fort Myers, FL 33901
Johann Fust Community Library	1040 West 10th Street Boca Grande, FL 33921
Lakes Regional Library	15290 Bass Road Fort Myers, FL 33919
North Fort Myers Public Library	2001 N. Tamiami Trail N.E. North Fort Myers, FL 33903
Northwest Regional Library	519 Chiquita Blvd. N. Cape Coral, FL 33993
Pine Island Public Library	10701 Russell Road Bokeelia, Florida 33922
Riverdale Branch Library	2421 Buckingham Road Fort Myers, FL 33905
South County Regional Library	21100 Three Oaks Parkway Estero, FL 33928
Talking Books Library	1651 Lee Street Fort Myers, FL 33901

== History ==
=== Bonita Springs Public Library ===
The Bonita Springs Public Library is one of the oldest in Lee County. Originally run by volunteers out of a small building and later, a women’s club, the library became a state-of-the-art facility in 2019, partially funded with money raised by the Friends of the Bonita Springs Public Library.

=== Captiva Memorial Library ===
The Captiva Memorial Library was founded by the Captiva Civic Association in 1936 as a lending library. The Captiva Memorial Library joined the Lee County Library System in 1978. Included in this library is a historical gallery provided by the Captiva Island Historical Society. This interactive exhibit is designed to resemble the interior of a mail boat named the Santiva. Touch screens allow visitors learn about the island’s earliest residents such as the Calusa Indians.

=== Dunbar-Jupiter Hammon Public Library ===
The Dunbar-Jupiter Hammon Public Library opened in 1974 and was named after Jupiter Hammond, the first published African American author, and Paul Laurence Dunbar, a well-renowned African American poet. This library has the most substantial collection of African American literature in the area. This collection is named in honor of Mary Rice, who dedicated over twenty years to managing the Dunbar-Jupiter Hammon Public Library and community outreach.

=== Lakes Regional Library ===
The Lakes Regional Library was established as the Rutenberg Library in 1991. In 2005 a larger building was constructed, and the library was renamed to the Lakes Regional Library. The building was later remodeled in 2020 due to a substantial donation from the Frances Prigmore estate.

=== Pine Island Public Library ===
Pine Island Public Library is one of thirteen Lee County Library System branches, and it is located at 10701 Russell Road, Bokeelia, Florida 33922. The main purpose of this library is to serve the local community by providing accessible information and resources for Pine Island patrons, while also promoting the diverse services offered by the Lee County Library System.

The Pine Island Public Library was established in 1962. Prior to this, those who lived on the islands only had access to library materials through a book boat utilized by volunteers from the Pine Island Center. The library was later moved to a larger facility in 1986. The original building is now home to The Museum of the Islands.

The original Pine Island Library facility has since been repurposed as the Museum of the Islands (MOTI). The initial proponents estimated that the renovation from library to museum would cost approximately $20,000, which was expected to be raised by the community. Should the fundraising efforts fall short, the county reserved the right to demolish the building. Ultimately, the renovation was successful, and the new Pine Island Library facility was inaugurated with a groundbreaking ceremony

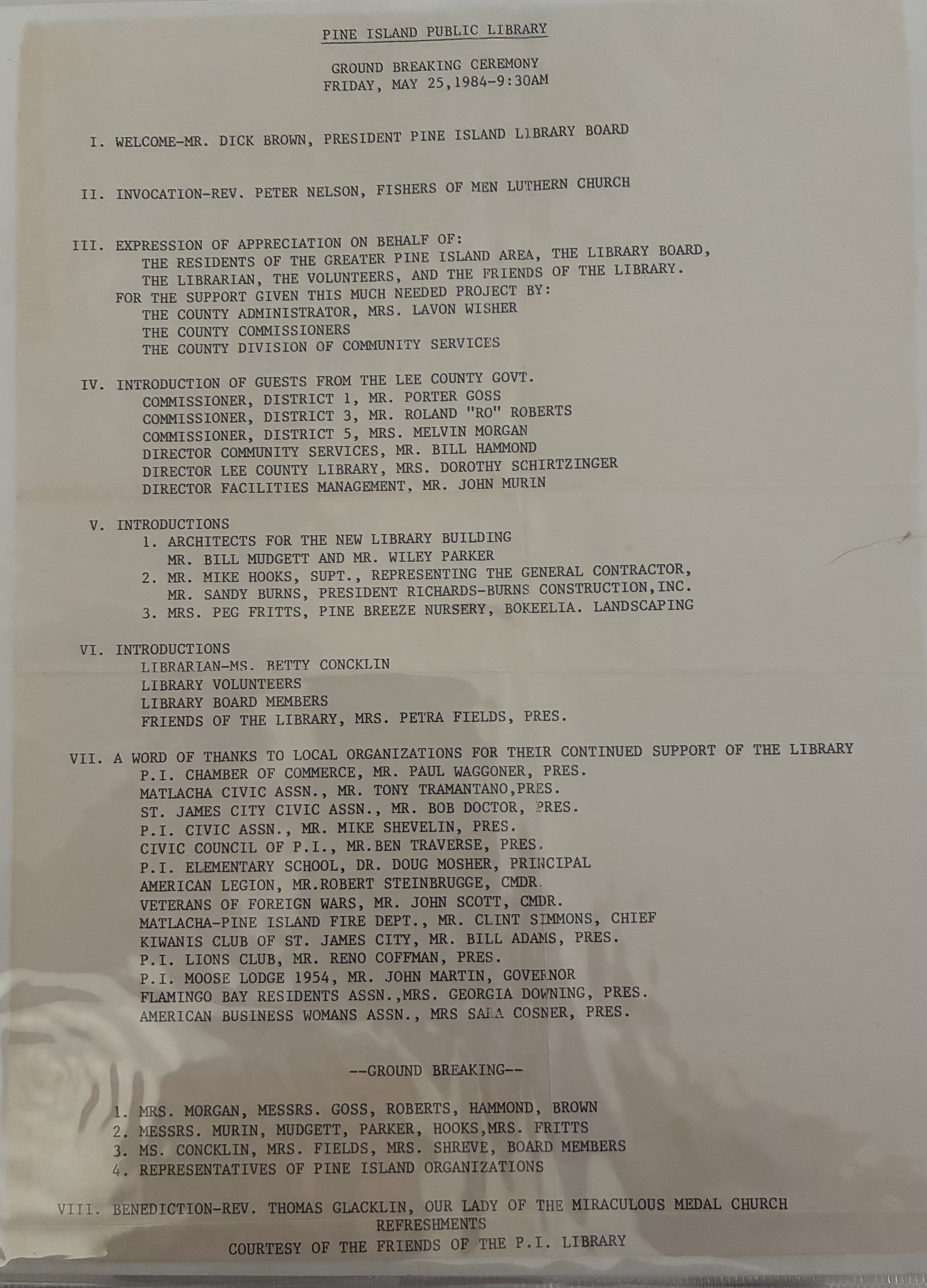
Official agenda of the Pine Island Public Library Ground Breaking Ceremony

on Friday, May 25, 1984, at 9:30 a.m. adjacent to the "new" Museum of the Islands. This event was attended by various board members, county commissioners, officials, library staff, and local residents. The new Pine Island Public Library facility officially opened on Monday, December 22, 1986, with Betty Conklin serving as Head Librarian.

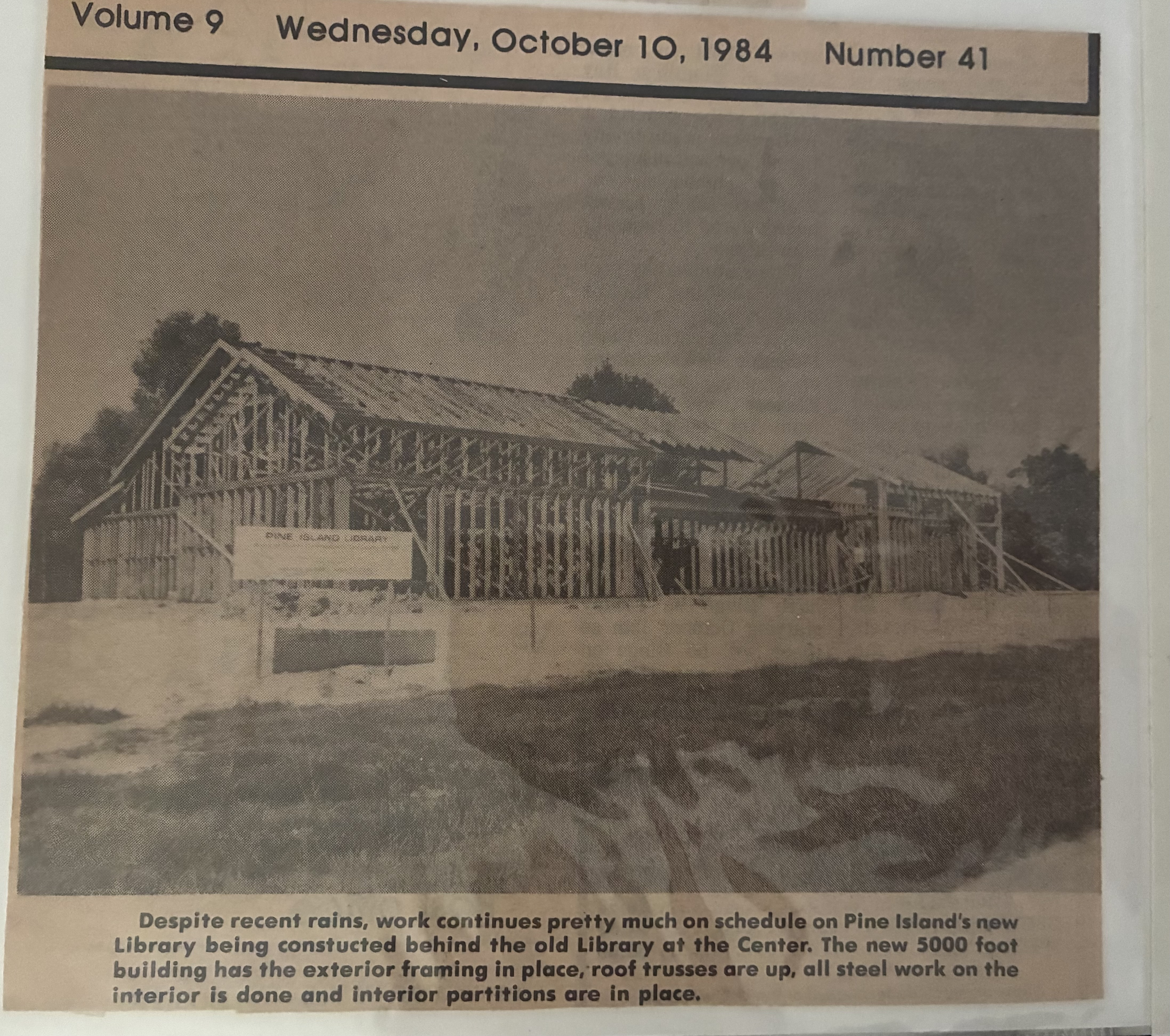
Pine Island Eagle Newspaper Article on the construction of the Pine Island Library1984

Pine Island Public Library offers a diverse array of collections that align with the standards of the Lee County Library System. These include a unique Florida collection, as well as a variety of materials for adults, teens, and children encompassing both fiction and non-fiction. The library also hosts a range of programs and events designed to engage and educate the community, including children's storytime sessions, adult crafts, and author talks, ensuring there is something for everyone to enjoy. Furthermore, Pine Island Public Library provides access to computers and the internet, helping to bridge the digital divide and equip patrons with essential tools for research, job searching, and maintaining connectivity in today's digital age.

The library staff is committed to fostering a welcoming environment where patrons can explore their interests, discover new passions, and connect with others who share similar pursuits. Volunteers play an integral role in supporting the library's mission, assisting with various tasks and enhancing the overall experience for visitors.

With its dedication to lifelong learning and community engagement, Pine Island Public Library remains a valued resource for residents and exemplifies the power of community collaboration and support. Whether you are a long-time resident or a new visitor, the library warmly invites you to explore its offerings and become part of its vibrant community.

== Library cards ==
=== Adult ===
Library cards are issued free of charge to individuals 18 years or older who:

- Are residents of Lee County for at least six months
- Are employed in Lee County
- Are property or business owners in Lee County
- Are students of Lee County
- Are residents of other Southwest Florida counties with libraries participating in the Reciprocal Borrowing program

Non-residents may obtain a Lee County Library card for a fee by showing photo identification.

Library cards are valid for two years, and renewal must be done in person, with the same documents as required for original card registration. Cards may be used at all branch locations. Loss or theft of a card, as well as any account changes, must be reported to the library immediately.

In order to obtain a replacement card, patron must show photo identification and pay a $1 fee.

=== Children/teens ===
Library cards with full privileges are free of charge for children and teens under age 18. Requirements include:

- Name ID, such as birth certificate, insurance card, school ID, official school schedule, report card or letter from school
- Parent or legal guardian who accompanies the child or teen shows ID for proof of address and owes less than $10 on his/her own library account

The Lee County Library System provides a way to pre-register for a card online. A temporary card grants access to downloadable and streaming materials. A permanent card can be obtained by proving eligibility at any branch.

=== Reciprocal Borrowing Program ===
Residents from participating neighboring counties may obtain a Lee County Library card free of charge through the Southwest Florida Library Network's (SWFLN) Reciprocal Borrowing Program. Residents of participating counties must first visit their own community's library and ask for a SWFLN Reciprocal Borrowing sticker, which they may then present to any Lee County Library location, along with photo identification. This must be done every calendar year.

== Services ==
The library system has over 1.5 million items available for patrons to use or check out, and circulates over 6 million items per year. The system also offers amenities such as meeting rooms, an online catalog and e-sources, as well as DVDs, CDs, and the streaming of movies and video. Each branch provides users with internet access, including wireless access points. The system also provides public access computers, and scanning and printing capabilities.

=== Telephone Reference ===
The Lee County Library System offers Telephone Reference to members to inquire about frequently asked questions, information regarding membership, library services, and reference help. LiveChat and text capabilities are also offered through this feature.

=== Interlibrary Loan (ILL) ===
The Lee County Library System allows members to borrow materials that are not owned by the LCLS through their Interlibrary Loan service. Members simply fill out a Request Form to place a hold on an item from another library system. Members can request up to three items at a time, including photocopy requests. However, items published within the last six months are not available to request. If members cannot find an item that they are looking for, they can recommend items through the Lee County Library System's Patron Purchase Request Form.

=== Bookmobile ===
The Lee County Library System has a mobile book service called the Bookmobile that travels throughout the county to bring materials to those who cannot physically make it to a library branch location, or those in housing projects and low income neighborhoods. Patrons of the bookmobile have about 4,000 items to choose from, including books, DVDs, and magazines in both English and Spanish. An in-person English

=== Literacy and Adult Basic Education ===
The Lee County Library System offers in-person and online programs to foster and support language learning, Literacy awareness and basic education. In-person language programs include ESL classes that offer adults formal instruction in reading, writing, and speaking English; and an English Cafe where members can practice their English speaking skills at Libraries in Lee County. Online language programs consist of a Spanish Conversation Club where members can practice their conversational Spanish skills with others regarding current events, as well as apps such as Mango Languages, Rosetta Stone, and News For You Online. A wide variety of literacy collection materials are offered, which assist members with school and career planning, citizenship preparation, and language learning. These materials include Gale Interactive Courses, Peterson's Career Prep, Peterson's Test Prep, and READY Collection Adult Literacy Materials. Each of these programs and resources are offered at no cost to library users.

=== Talking Books ===
The Lee County Library System is a subregional library of the Florida Bureau of Braille and Talking Books Library. Recorded books are shipped free of charge to patrons who fill out an application affirming their visual or physical disability that makes traditional reading difficult. In addition to recorded books, the Talking Books Library also provides Braille books and narrated magazines. The Lee County Talking Books Library has thousands of titles in its collection as well as access to 2.5 million titles through the Florida Bureau of Braille and Talking Books Library.

=== Books-by-Mail ===
Books-by-Mail is a service offered by the Lee County Library System, which supplies library materials to individuals who are unable to use the library due to temporary or long-term physical and medical disabilities. Books-by-Mail sends materials, including books, CD books, DVDs, Blu-ray and music CDs through the mail in zippered nylon bags to registered patrons. When the materials are due, the patron attaches postage and mails the bag back to Books-by-Mail, or drops off the bag at any branch of the Lee County Library System.

=== Online library ===
The Lee County Library System is partnered with Overdrive, Libby, Kanopy, and hoopla to provide popular digital content. These services allow free access to eBooks, audiobooks, magazines, videos, video streaming, and music.

== Southwest Florida Reading Festival ==
The Southwest Florida Festival is the second largest reading festival in Florida. It draws thousands of fans to hear and meet best-selling authors, participate in creative contests and activities, and find the latest and greatest in books and information technology. It is a fun, informative and entertaining one-day event that celebrates books and the written word, and promotes reading, literacy and free library services. The festival appeals to all ages, with adult and children's programs. This annual event is usually held in downtown Fort Myers in March. The Lee County Library System produces the festival, which began in 2000. The most recent festival event was on March 1, 2025. Florida SouthWestern State Colleges', Richard H. Rush Library tabled the event for the first time since this festival's inception.

== Fandom Fest ==
Fandom Fest is a free, annual celebration of geek and pop culture that offers live music, contests, and cosplay. It is hosted by the Lee County Library System. It is located at the Fort Myers Regional Library located at 2450 First Street. It includes live entertainment, a reading challenge, character meet and greets, an all-ages costume contest, and lots of prizes. The festival is divided into fandom themed areas which have included Space, Sword and Sorcery, Superheroes and Villains, and Asian Culture. This event offers a mixture of activities, games, tech demos, and DIY makerspaces. There is a virtual reality hub, as well as Kpop dance tutorials. The Fandom reading challenge allows participants to win prizes through virtual activities using the READsquared app platform. Participants of all ages can win prizes. The Character meet and greets allow participants to take pictures with their favorite characters. The costume contest has categories for birth-age 5, kids ages 6–11, teens ages 12–17, and adults ages 18 and up. The winner is chosen by crowdsourced voting and a judges panel. To ensure everyone's safety and enjoyment of Fandom Fest, attendees must observe the Lee County Library System Patron Code of Conduct on festival day.

In 2020, the Fandom Fest was held exclusively online, and the one-day Fandom Fest was converted into a month-long virtual festival with different themed weeks, costumes, and prizes. It returned to an in-person event in 2021.

== Library support ==
The library receives public support in a variety of ways, including through Friends groups, volunteers, and donations.

Due to inflation and changes in public views towards government spending, library budgets have needed to turn to Friends of the Library groups for fundraising from private sources.

According to the State of Florida's 2017-2018 statistics, Lee County Library System's Friends groups had a total of 1,270 members, raised $152,589 for their library system, and spent $80,829 on projects and programs.

Social Media

Lee County Library System currently has a Facebook page with 800 followers with a plethora of information about their branches, events and services offered.
