= Norm Ledgin =

American writer and journalist (1928–2019)

Norman Michael Ledgin (born July 15, 1928, in Passaic, New Jersey; died June 18, 2019, in Stanley, Kansas) was an American writer and journalist, living in the Stanley section of Overland Park, Kansas. He was known for two books dealing with autism, Asperger's and Self-Esteem: Insight and Hope Through Famous Role Models (2002) and Diagnosing Jefferson: Evidence of a Condition that Guided His Beliefs, Behavior, and Personal Associations (2000). The latter argues that Thomas Jefferson demonstrated traits of Asperger syndrome. In 2012 he completed the historical novel "Sally of Monticello: Founding Mother", a portrayal of the 38-year love affair between Thomas Jefferson and Sally Hemings.

Ledgin was also author of The Jayhawker (2007, new edition 2013), historical fiction dealing with the 1850s Kansas Border War, and with Bethine Louise of Lee's Summit, MO, coauthor of Sour Notes: A Sally Freberg Mystery (2009). He was a former traffic safety educator (Source, records of the National Safety Council, Inc.) and was a nationally recognized speaker on autism topics for Future Horizons, Inc. (publisher and conference sponsor, Arlington, TX, Wayne Gilpin, President). He was a speaker as well on local history subjects.

He was a 1950 graduate of Rutgers University, New Brunswick, New Jersey, where he served as editor-in-chief of The Targum, campus newspaper. He editorialized for the overturning of loyalty oaths for R.O.T.C. cadets (the oaths were quickly suspended by order of the Commanding General, First Army HQ., Governor's Island) and for desegregation of fraternities. To set an example in the latter effort, in his junior year he joined Omega Psi Phi, a predominantly African-American fraternity. (Source, Rutgers Alumni Association and Rutgersensia files of The Targum). In 1952 he earned a Master of Arts degree in political science from Rutgers. (Source, graduate records, Rutgers University, New Brunswick, NJ)

In 1951 Ledgin was condemned publicly by the (U.S. Congress) House Un-American Activities Committee for serving as a U.S. sponsor of the Stockholm Peace Appeal, which opposed development, stockpiling, and use of nuclear weapons by the U.S. and U.S.S.R. He contends that his early stands against the arms race and against racial segregation resulted in his being blacklisted in the newspaper profession (primarily a result of publication of House Report 378, 82nd Congress, 1st Session, April 1, 1951--"Report on the Communist 'Peace' Offensive"). (Source, House Report 378, 82nd Congress)

He went on to teach journalism at McNeese State College in Lake Charles, Louisiana, then served five years in safety administration in Southwest Louisiana, winning the citation "Outstanding Young Man of the Year" and the Distinguished Service Award from the Lake Charles Junior Chamber of Commerce in 1962. (Source, Lake Charles American Press)

He moved on to serve a similar administrative role 14 years (1962–76) in Kansas City, Missouri, where he won top awards including the National Safety Council Trustees' Award, "Flame of Life", 1963; Award of Honor, Association of Safety Council Executives, 1974; and Distinguished Service to Safety Award, National Safety Council, 1974. He also served the national organization as chairman of its Driver Improvement Program ("defensive driving"), 1967–68. (Source, records of the National Safety Council, Inc.) In his Kansas City work, in 1966 he co-founded, with Municipal Judge Earle W. Frost, the city's Driver Improvement School. (Source, records of the Kansas City, Missouri, Coordinating Committee on Traffic Safety)

From 1976 to 1984 he edited and, with his wife, the former Marsha Montague, co-published country weekly newspapers in Arthur, Illinois, and in the Stanley-Stilwell communities of Johnson County, Kansas.

On June 18, 2019, Ledgin died from degenerative lung disease. He had five children.
