= David Mazzarella =

American journalist

- Born: 29 June 1938; Newark
- Died: 17 July 2025 (aged 87); Falls Church
- Alma mater: Rutgers University–New Brunswick

Tullio Peter David Mazzarella (died July 17, 2025) was an American journalist and newspaper editor. He was the editor of USA TODAY from 1994 to 1999.

In 2012, he published the book Always Eat the Hard Crust of the Bread: Recollections and Recipes from My Centenarian Mother.
