= Karey Lee Woolsey =

American singer-songwriter (born 1976)

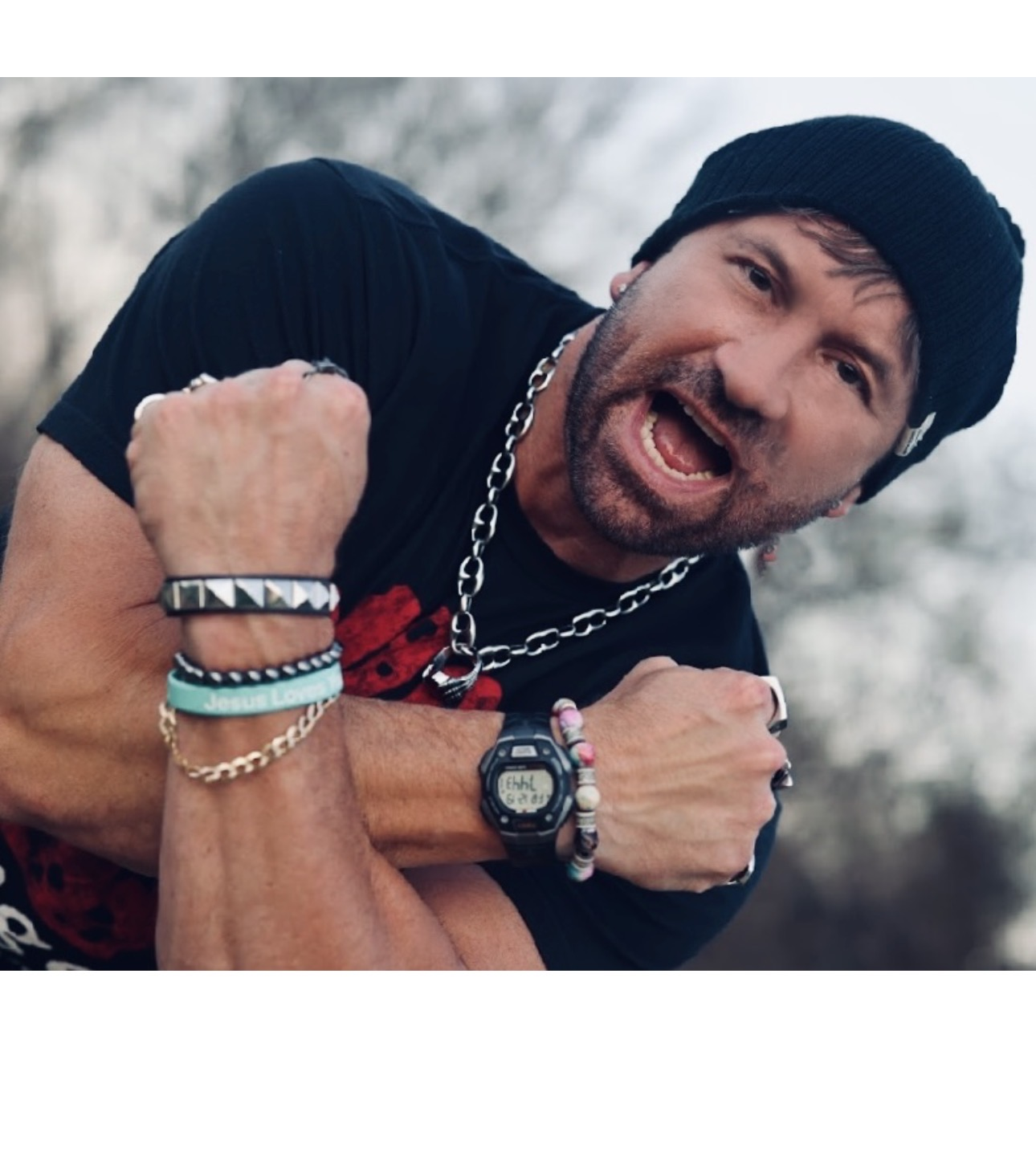
Karey Lee Woolsey in 2026

Karey Lee Woolsey (born July 12, 1976) is an American singer-songwriter, who built a successful music career touring Florida and the East Coast with his band 3 Days Apart before he became involved in an organization bringing marijuana into the state. Woolsey was convicted in 2008 of attempting to distribute more than 7,000 pounds of marijuana and served a 13-year sentence at the Federal Correctional Institution, Yazoo City Low (Miss.) While incarcerated in July 2013, Woolsey released an album that hit fourth on Billboard's Heatseekers South Atlantic chart.

== Early life ==
Woolsey was born in Atlanta, Georgia, and moved to the Houston, Texas, area at an early age. His family later moved to Cape Coral, Florida, where they still reside.

Woolsey began writing songs at age 13, placing his first in rotation at a local radio station. He began to win talent competitions by performing his original compositions. While attending Cape Coral High School, he formed his own band, 3 Days Apart, playing guitar and singing his original songs in clubs around Fort Myers and, later, throughout the state and up the coast. Woolsey opened up for bands such as Sister Hazel, 3 Doors Down, Creed, Jars of Clay, and Lenny Kravitz.

== Criminal activity ==
In 2002, after a performance in a local club, Woolsey was approached by several men flashing money around. After striking up a conversation, he learned that the men were involved in the marijuana trade. Lured by the promise of easy money, Woolsey became involved with the men; meanwhile, his music career suffered as his focus shifted toward drugs. Soon, however, one of the members of the group was arrested. When pressed by federal authorities, the man named Woolsey as a co-conspirator, and due to his lack of cooperation he was charged in 2007 with conspiracy to distribute 7,000 lbs of marijuana.

While awaiting sentencing, Woolsey recorded "Freedom," an album of original songs. It was released independently and became available on iTunes and streaming music services. After recording "Freedom," Woolsey was sentenced to 13 years in federal prison, reporting to serve his sentence in 2008. He's projected to be released in 2017. In April 2014, Woolsey asked President Barack Obama for a commutation of his remaining sentence. He is still waiting to hear whether it has been approved or denied.

== Post-incarceration ==
Woolsey has spent his time in prison writing and performing new songs. After his release, he continued his music career. While stating he was "on to bigger and better things, since his release he stated that he at first felt like "such a loser."

== Billboard charts ==
In July 2013, Karey Lee hit the Billboard Heatseeker South Atlantic chart at number four with the release of his album A Million Miles Away. The album is selling on iTunes, cdbaby.com and Amazon.com, where it ranked third in Adult Alternative sales the week it was released.

== Discography ==
2026

Album: Redemption

”Vibin With Me”

”Please God”

”Beautiful”

”Do You Remember”

”Big Mouth”

”Change Your Mind”

”Love Me Back”

”After All This Time”

”Self Control”

2014
Reach for the Stars (single)

2013
Album: A Million Miles Away
"These Walls Around Me"
"Big Mouth Bitch"
"Fall In You"
"Get Up And Drive"
"309"
"God"
"Only In My Dreams"
"I Am"
"Chains"
"Evils Creepin"
"Sweet Talkin Lover"
"Busted"
"Freedom"

2007
Album: Freedom
"Fall in You"
"Anyway"
"Get Up and Drive"
"Lost 'Boring Stories'"
"Only in My Dreams"
"Big Mouth Bitch"
"Chains"
"God"
"The Man for You"
"I Am"
"Might Die"
"Sweet Talkin Lover"
"Walk the Wire"
"What About Me?"
"Feel"
"Freedom"
