= Southwest Florida College =

Private Career Training College

Coordinates: 26.5967°N 81.8777°W

Southwest Florida College (SWFC) was a private career training college in Florida founded in 1974. It had campuses in Fort Myers, Tampa and Port Charlotte, as well as a "learning site" in Bonita Springs. In 2014, Southern Technical College Suncoast LLC acquired these campuses and changed the rebranded them to Southern Technical College. Currently, these campuses offer Bachelor's, Associate's and diploma programs on campus and online.
