= 1926 Miami hurricane =

Category 4 Atlantic hurricane that hit Florida in 1926

Hurricane Seven 1926 Miami hurricane Great Miami hurricane of 1926
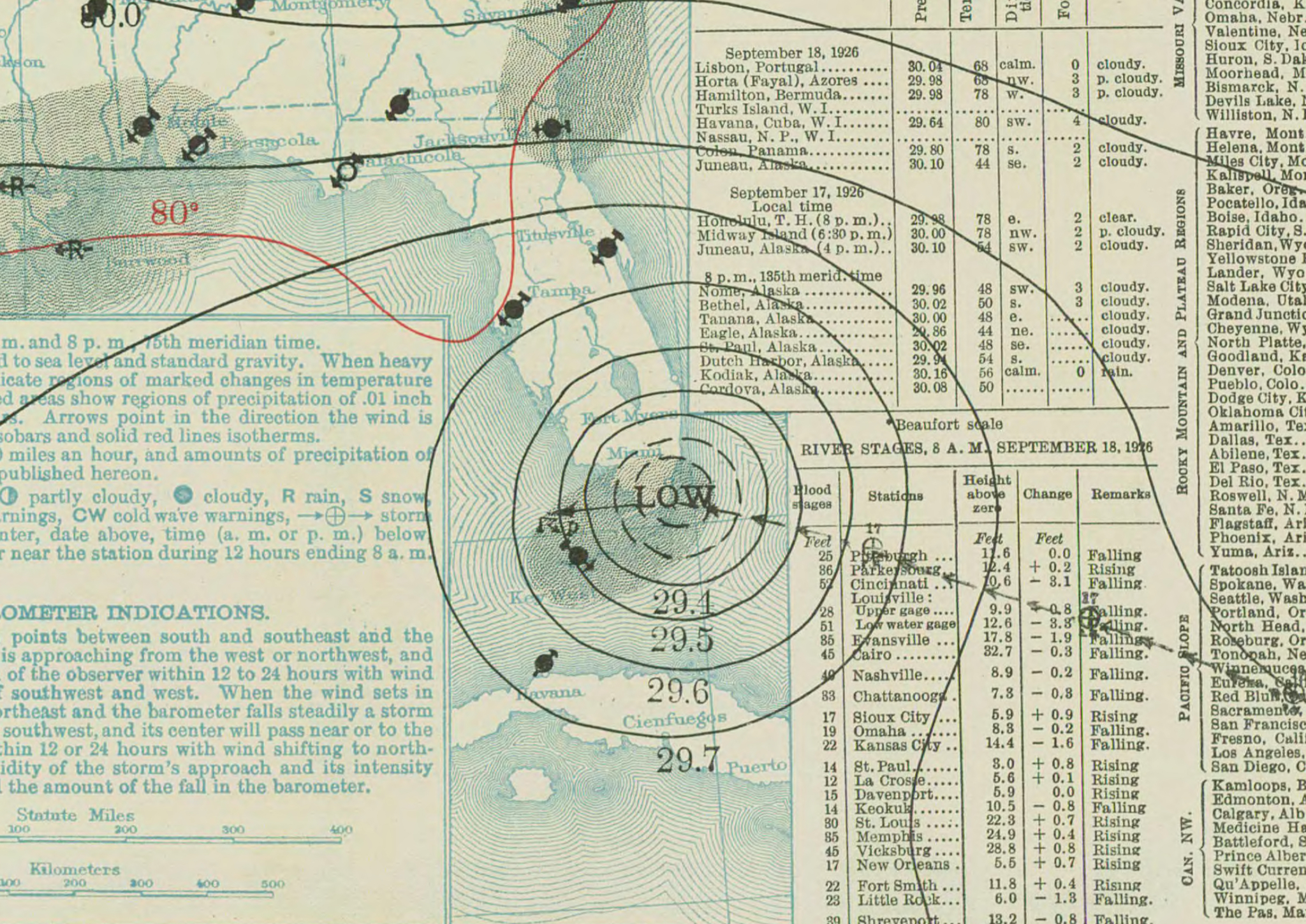
- Surface weather analysis of the hurricane making landfall near Miami in Southern Florida on September 18

Meteorological history
- Formed: September 11, 1926
- Dissipated: September 22, 1926

Category 4 major hurricane
- 1-minute sustained (SSHWS/NWS)
- Highest winds: 150 mph (240 km/h)
- Lowest pressure: 930 mbar (hPa); 27.46 inHg (estimated)

Overall effects
- Fatalities: 372–539+
- Damage: $100 million (1926 USD) (Costliest U.S. hurricane on record when adjusted for wealth normalization – $235.9 billion in 2018)
- Areas affected: Turks and Caicos Islands; The Bahamas; Florida; Alabama; Mississippi; Louisiana; Texas
- IBTrACS /
- Part of the 1926 Atlantic hurricane season

The Great Miami Hurricane of 1926 was a large and intense tropical cyclone that devastated the Greater Miami area of Florida and caused catastrophic damage in the Bahamas and the U.S. Gulf Coast in September 1926, accruing a US$100 million damage toll. The devastation brought by the hurricane resulted in the end of Florida's land boom, and represented an early start to the Great Depression in the state. It has been estimated that a similar hurricane would cause about $235 billion in damage if it were to hit Miami in 2018.

The hurricane is believed to have formed in the central Atlantic Ocean on September 11. (Note: For consistency, Coordinated Universal Time (UTC) is used for all references of time as the cyclone existed in multiple time zones during its existence.) Steadily strengthening as it tracked west-northwestward, the storm reached hurricane intensity the next day. As a result of scattered observations at open sea, however, no ship encountered the storm until September 15, by which time it had reached major hurricane intensity north of the Virgin Islands. Strengthening continued up until the following day, when the storm reached peak intensity with a strength equivalent to a Category 4 hurricane. This intensity was maintained as the storm tracked across the Turks and Caicos and the Bahamas to landfall near Miami on September 18.

The hurricane caused immense destruction throughout the islands and across southern Florida. The storm destroyed hundreds of structures in its path over the islands, leaving thousands of residents homeless. At least seventeen deaths occurred on the islands, though many others—some related only indirectly to the storm—were reported in the aftermath. Upon striking South Florida, the cyclone generated hurricane-force winds over a broad swath of the region, causing widespread and severe structural damage from both wind and water. Most of the deaths occurred near Lake Okeechobee, when a large storm surge breached muck dikes and drowned hundreds of people.

The hurricane quickly traversed the Florida peninsula before emerging into the Gulf of Mexico near Fort Myers. It flooded surrounding communities and barrier islands, while strong winds downed trees and disrupted electrical service. The storm later made two landfalls with weaker intensities on Alabama and Mississippi on September 20 and 21, respectively. It caused additional but less severe damage in those states, primarily from heavy rains and storm surge. Land interaction caused the cyclone to deteriorate and later dissipate on September 22.

== Meteorological history ==
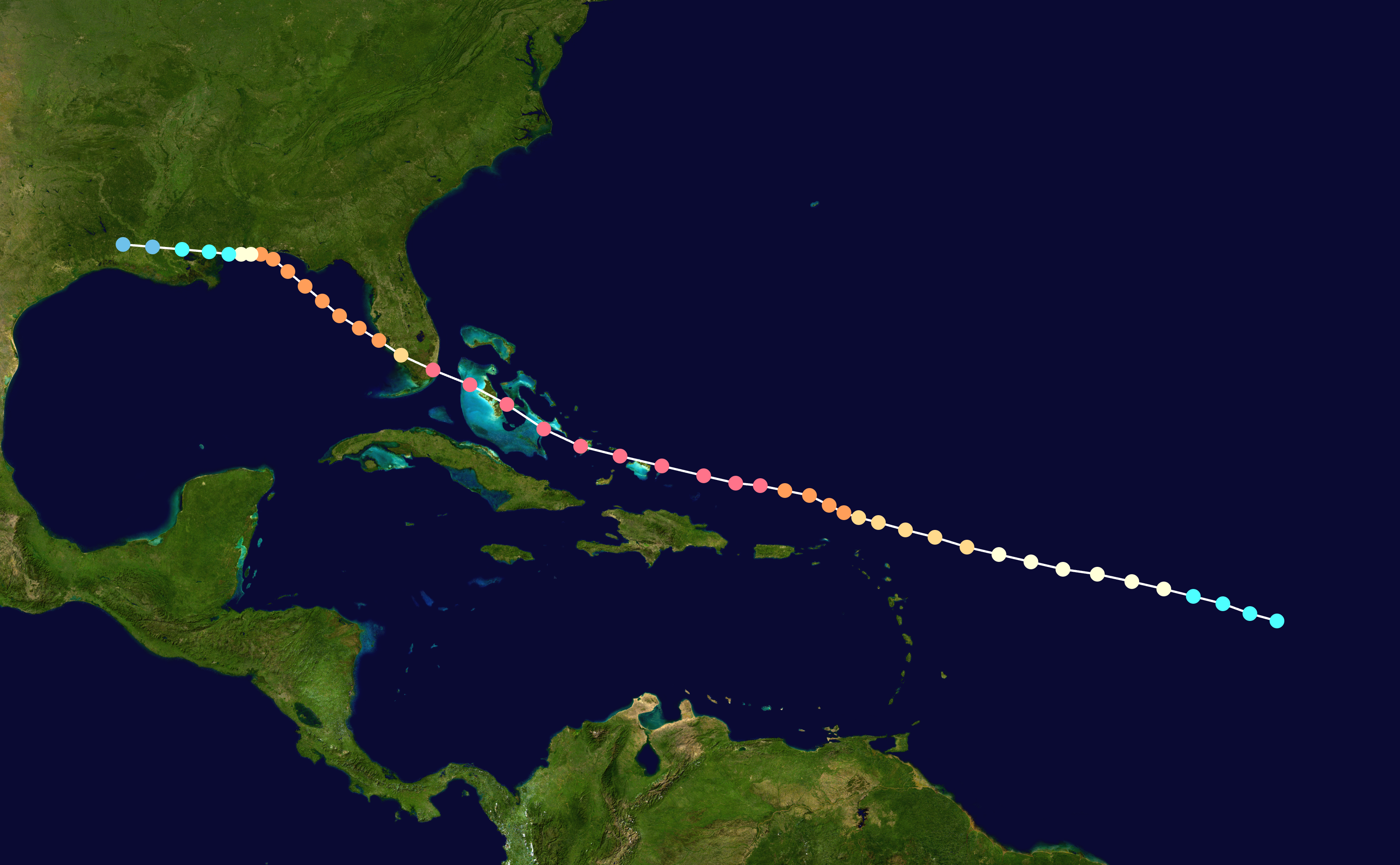
Map plotting the storm's track and intensity, according to the Saffir–Simpson scale Map key Saffir–Simpson scale Tropical depression (≤38 mph, ≤62 km/h) Tropical storm (39–73 mph, 63–118 km/h) Category 1 (74–95 mph, 119–153 km/h) Category 2 (96–110 mph, 154–177 km/h) Category 3 (111–129 mph, 178–208 km/h) Category 4 (130–156 mph, 209–251 km/h) Category 5 (≥157 mph, ≥252 km/h) Unknown Storm type Tropical cyclone Subtropical cyclone Extratropical cyclone, remnant low, tropical disturbance, or monsoon depression

Due to the sparseness of available observations in the central Atlantic, the specific origins of the 1926 Miami hurricane remain unclear. Operationally, the United States Weather Bureau in Washington, D.C., did not begin issuing advisories on the cyclone until September 14. However, the cyclone is first listed in HURDAT—the official Atlantic hurricane database—as having begun as a tropical storm with maximum sustained winds of 65 mph (105 km/h) roughly 1,100 mi (1,800 km) east of the island of Martinique in the Lesser Antilles on September 11. Tracking west-northwestward, the storm gradually intensified and reached hurricane intensity on September 12 while still east of the Lesser Antilles. The observation of low barometric pressures and winds suggesting cyclonic rotation at Saint Kitts on the evening of September 14 was the first to suggest that a hurricane had developed. The following day, the steamship Matura encountered the strengthening tropical cyclone and documented a minimum pressure of 28.82 inHg (976 mb). By 06:00 UTC on September 15, the storm had strengthened further to major hurricane intensity north of the Virgin Islands.

Strengthening continued into September 16 as the hurricane reached a strength equivalent to that of a Category 4 on the modern-day Saffir–Simpson hurricane wind scale. Although no official minimum pressure readings were taken in the area at the time, the tropical cyclone peaked in wind-based intensity at 18:00 UTC on September 16 with sustained winds of 150 mph (240 km/h), near the uppermost limit of the modern-day ranking Category 4. With this strength the hurricane passed near the Turks and Caicos Islands, though its intensity at the time was based on the extent of damage there as any measurement device was knocked out by the damaging winds. Shortly afterward, the cyclone struck the Bahamian island of Mayaguana at its peak intensity. After passing the island, the hurricane slightly weakened but maintained formidable strength as it accelerated through the southern Bahamas, passing near Nassau on September 17. The storm then made a second landfall on Andros Island in the Mangrove Cay district early on September 18. Thereafter, the hurricane crossed Andros Island and passed over the Gulf Stream en route to Florida. This trajectory brought the storm ashore on the coast of South Florida near Perrine, located just 15 mi (24 km) south of Downtown Miami, before 12:00 UTC on September 18 with winds of 145 mph (233 km/h) and a minimum pressure estimated at 930 mb (27 inHg). At the time, the hurricane was very large in size, with a radius of outermost closed isobar 375 mi (604 km) across; hurricane-force winds were reported from the upper Florida Keys to near St. Lucie County. Around 20:30 UTC, the eye of the hurricane passed into the Gulf of Mexico near Punta Rassa; though by that time the pressure in the eye had only risen to 28.05 inHg (950 mb), the winds in the eye wall had decreased to 105 mph (169 km/h). The hurricane had weakened over South Florida as a result of land interaction, but re-strengthened after emerging into the Gulf of Mexico off Punta Rassa six hours later.

The warm waters of the Gulf of Mexico allowed for the tropical cyclone to reach a secondary peak intensity with winds of 125 mph (201 km/h) on September 20, equivalent to that of a modern-day high-end Category 3 hurricane. Although the storm had taken a more northwesterly course through the gulf, the hurricane later began paralleling the coast of the Florida Panhandle and thus slowly curved westward. As a result, the major hurricane, now weakening quickly, made its second landfall near Perdido Beach, Alabama, at around 21:30 UTC that day with winds of 115 mph (185 km/h). After landfall, the storm quickly weakened and meandered off Alabama's barrier islands, eventually moving ashore for the last time on September 21 near Gulfport, Mississippi, as a tropical storm. The cyclone continued its decay inland, degenerating into a tropical depression the following day before dissipating over Louisiana shortly thereafter.

== Preparations ==
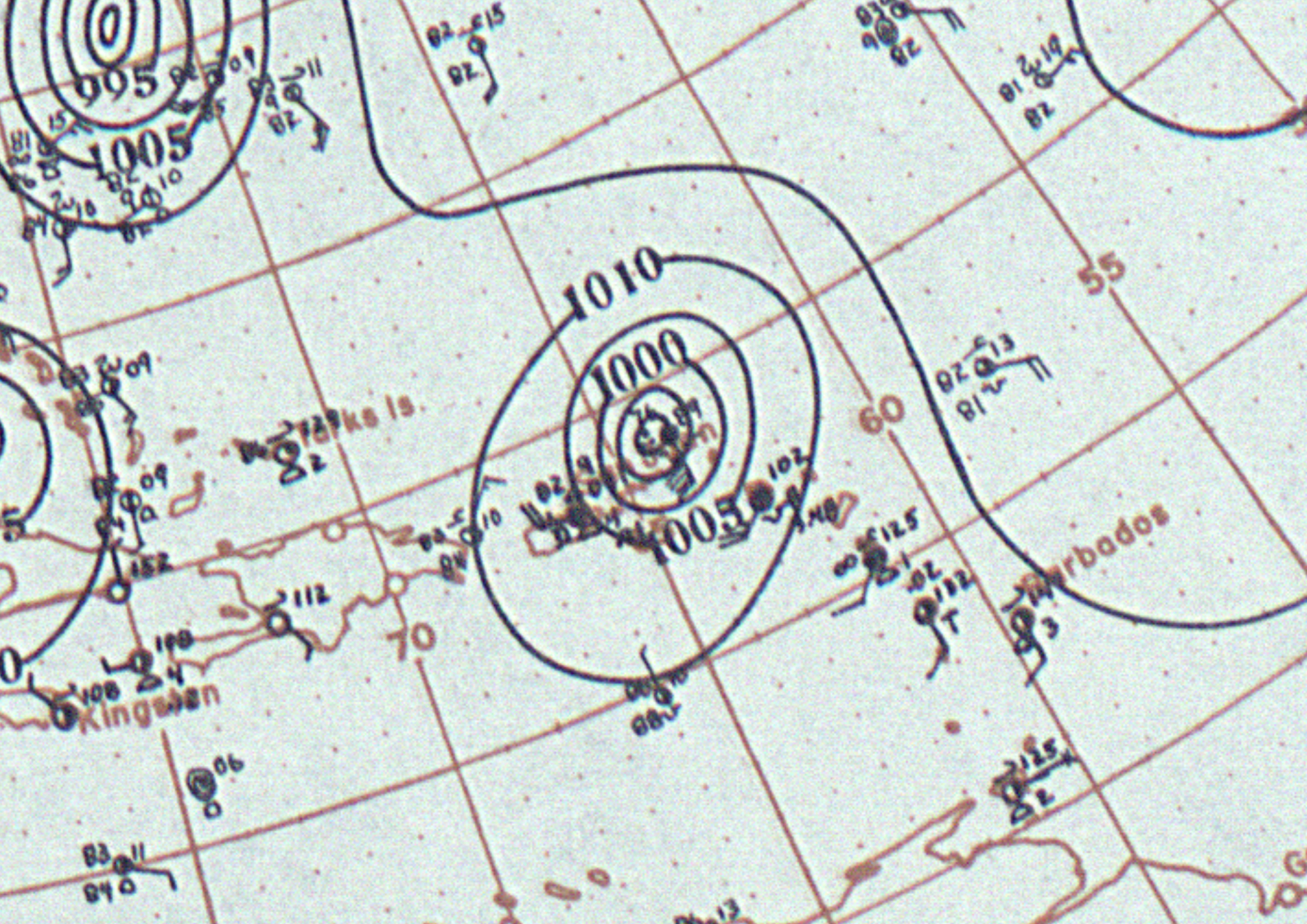
Synoptic weather map of the hurricane passing north of the U.S Virgin Islands and Puerto Rico on September 15

On September 16, the United States Weather Bureau advised caution to ships tracking in Bahamian waters and the Florida Straits. The first tropical cyclone warning associated with the storm was a northeast storm warning issued on September 17 for the Florida coast from Jupiter Inlet to Key West, Florida. Warnings along the United States Eastern Seaboard eventually stretched as far north as Charleston, South Carolina, upon the storm's first landfall. Additional warnings were posted for the United States Gulf Coast on September 19 and covered coastal areas from Apalachicola, Florida, to Burrwood, Louisiana. Information on the storm as ascertained by the U.S. Weather Bureau was relayed by various radio and local press services, though the bureau specifically acknowledged the Mobile Register for their efforts in disseminating storm details.

== Impact ==
Costliest U.S. Atlantic hurricanes, 1900–2017 Direct economic losses, normalized to societal conditions in 2018
Rank	Hurricane	Season	Cost
1	4 "Miami"	1926	$235.9 billion
2	4 "Galveston"	1900	$138.6 billion
3	3 Katrina	2005	$116.9 billion
4	4 "Galveston"	1915	$109.8 billion
5	5 Andrew	1992	$106.0 billion
6	ET Sandy	2012	$73.5 billion
7	3 "Cuba–Florida"	1944	$73.5 billion
8	4 Harvey	2017	$62.2 billion
9	3 "New England"	1938	$57.8 billion
10	4 "Okeechobee"	1928	$54.4 billion
Main article: List of costliest Atlantic hurricanes

=== Lucayan Archipelago ===
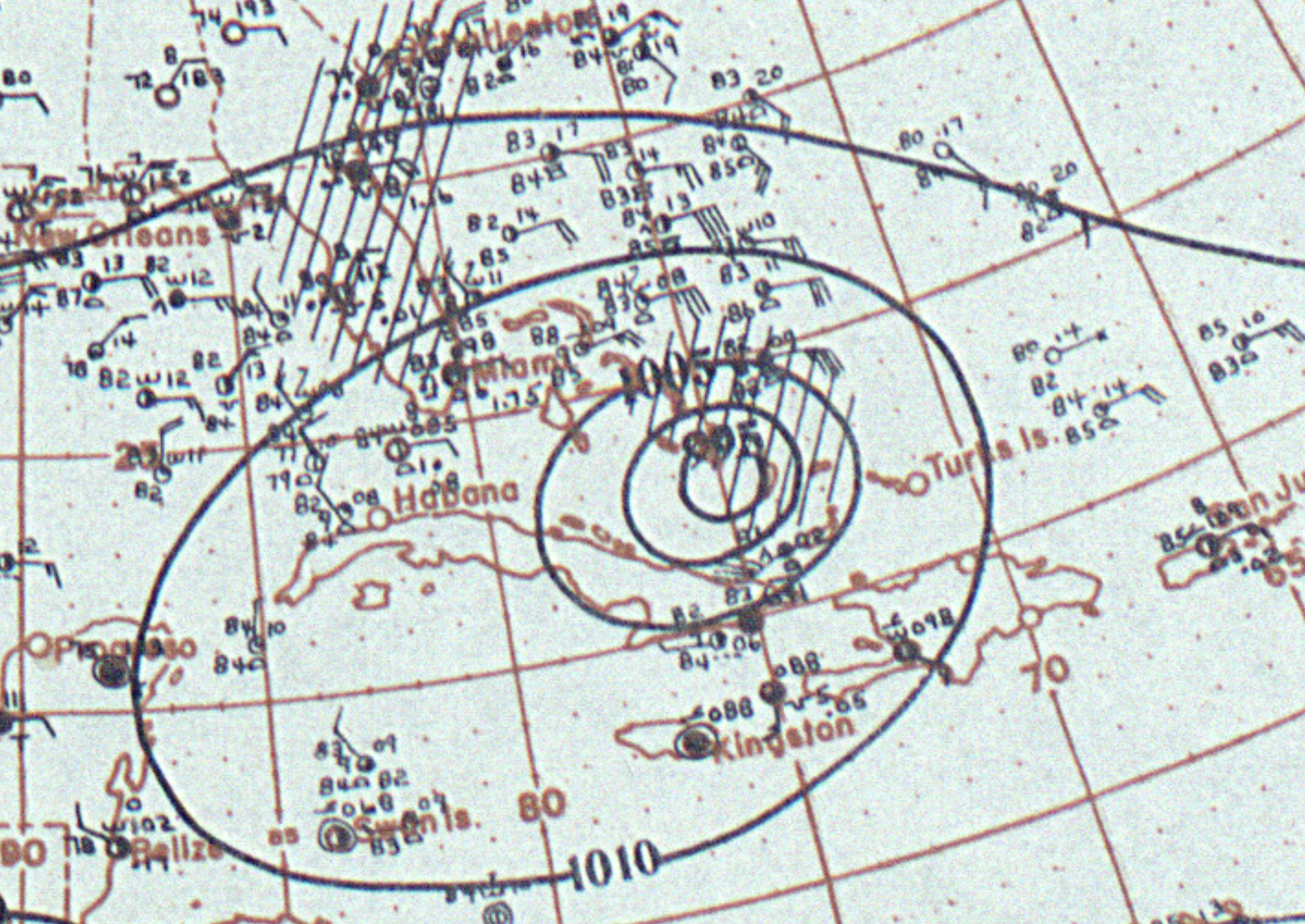
Synoptic weather map of the hurricane over the Bahamas and approaching South Florida on September 17

Although no fatalities were reported, the hurricane wrought extensive property damage to Grand Turk Island. Rain gauges recorded 10 in (250 mm) of rain during the storm, and high surf left knee-deep sand drifts on the island. The ocean covered the land up to 3/4 mi (1.2 km) inland, and winds unroofed buildings at the weather station. Reportedly, the winds even ripped spines from prickly pear cacti. Nearly all lighters at port were lost. The storm left 4,000 people homeless on three of the islands in the Turks and Caicos. Due to hampered communication, the extent of damage in the Bahamas was initially unclear. In the Bahamas, the storm flattened hundreds of structures and killed at least 17 people, mostly on Bimini, where seven people died and the greatest property damage occurred. The hurricane also leveled many structures on Andros, including churches and large buildings, and downed trees and other homes on New Providence. On parts of Andros, the storm snapped or felled almost all of the coconut palms, and in the Exuma district a large storm surge ruined many crops. The storm also destroyed 60% of the homes on the north island of Bimini, left water up to 7 ft (2.1 m) deep in some areas, and was widely considered the worst storm on record in Bimini to date. Some sources say 25 people died on Bimini, but these may have been indirect deaths, as many people reportedly perished after drinking contaminated well water.

=== United States ===
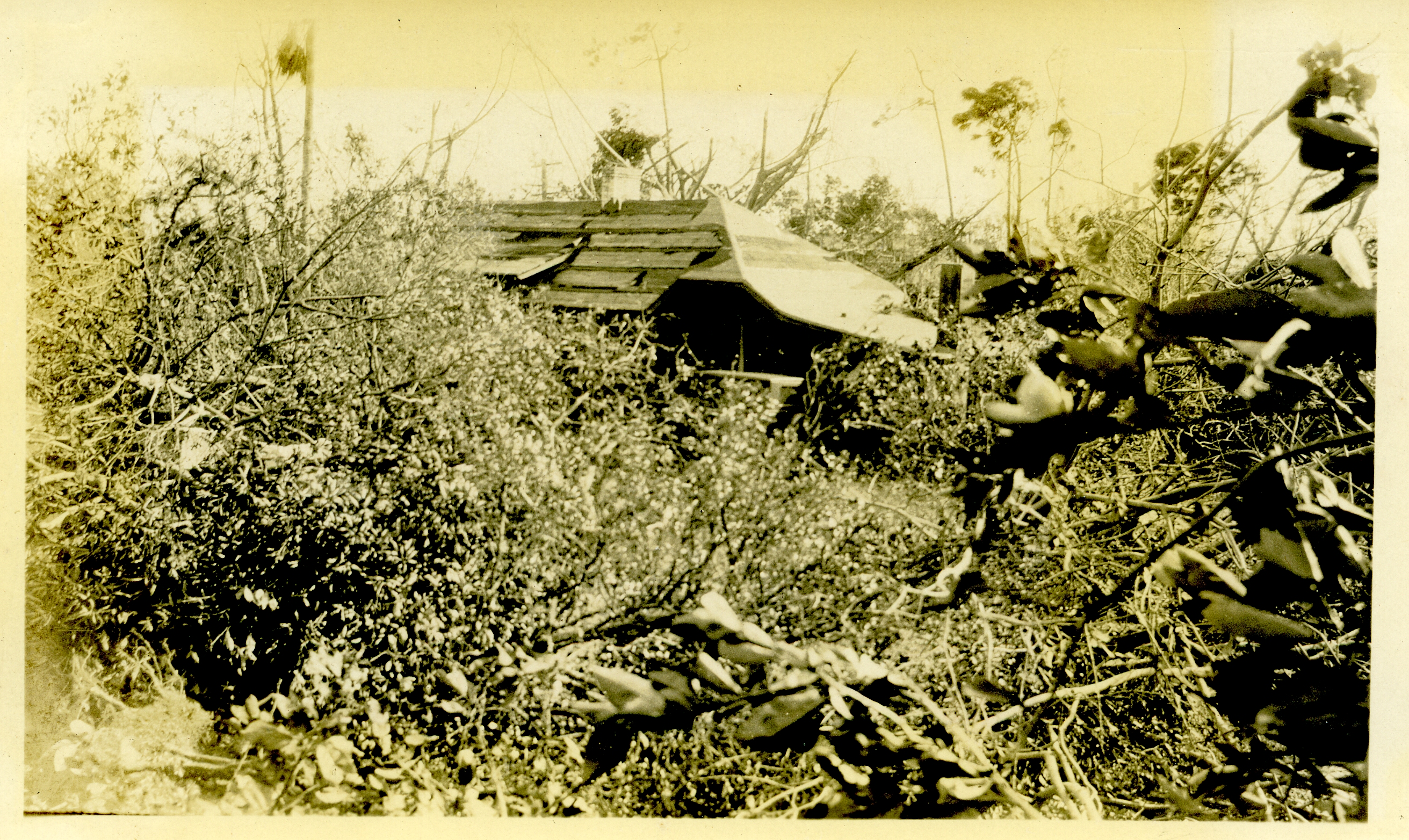
Damage to a home near Miami, Florida

The 1926 hurricane is known primarily for its impacts and lasting aftermath in South Florida, particularly in the Miami area.

Effects were concentrated around Florida's southeastern coast and south-central Florida, with additional impacts in Northwest Florida. Damage figures from the storm in the state alone reached US$75 million and accounted for most of the damage that the tropical cyclone produced. Although the official number of fatalities would later be revised downward, initial estimates suggested that the death toll would likely be over 1,000 in Miami alone with an additional 2,000 injured. Nonetheless, the grave number of casualties forced resorts to serve as temporary morgues and hospitals. Homes and office buildings were used to serve as refugee camps for the approximately 38,000 people displaced by the hurricane.

==== Miami metropolitan area ====
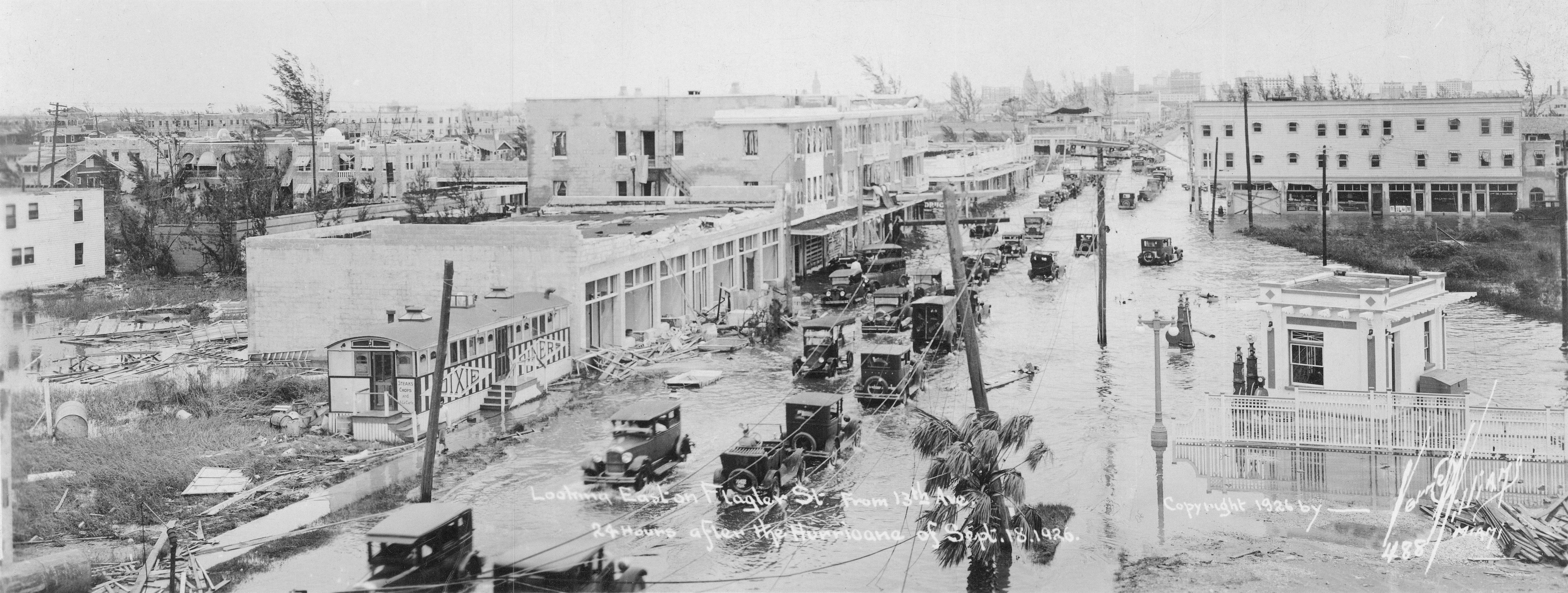
Looking East on Flagler St. from 13th Ave, 24 hours after the hurricane of September 18, 1926

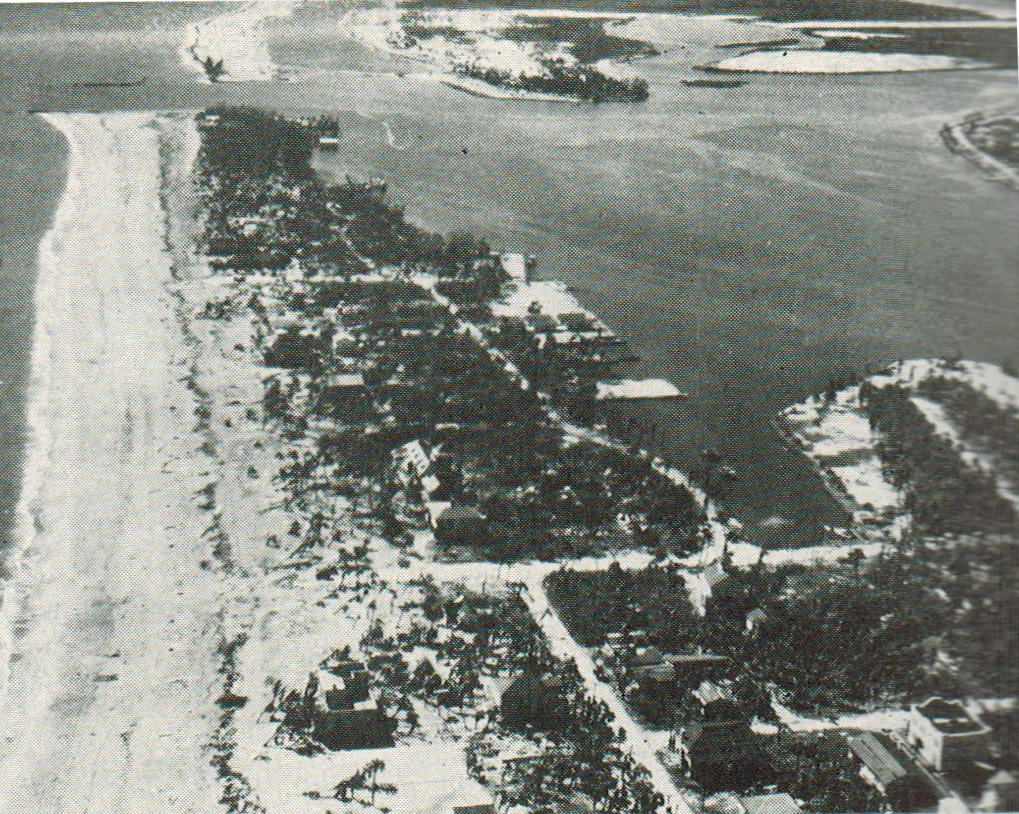
Damage on Fort Lauderdale beach, near Port Everglades

The storm surge in South Florida was not as high as it would have been had the hurricane struck another area, owing to the deep offshore continental shelf, which increased the energy needed to sustain a large surge. However, along Biscayne Bay, the hurricane produced a substantial storm surge; visual estimates suggested a peak height of 14 to 15 ft (4.3 to 4.6 m) in Coconut Grove, and a value of 11.7 ft (3.6 m) occurred at Dinner Key, equal to the observation at Biscayne Boulevard in Downtown Miami. In fact, the storm surge measured in the 1926 hurricane was the highest ever officially documented on the east coast of South Florida until observers recorded a height of 16.89 ft (5.15 m) at the Burger King International Headquarters near Cutler in Dade County during Hurricane Andrew in 1992. The hurricane's high storm surge swept into Miami and Miami Beach, flooding city streets with knee-deep water. Yachts and large vessels were carried by the intense wind and waves onto shore. The MacArthur Causeway connecting Miami and Miami Beach was submerged under 6 ft (1.8 m) of water.

Waves several feet high were rolling up Las Olas Boulevard, which had the appearance of a river rather than a street. ... Practically the entire town was covered with three feet of water.

— M. A. Hortt, former mayor of Fort Lauderdale

Communication between the two locales as well as the rest of the United States was cut after all local telecommunications and power lines were blown down. Due to their susceptibility to strong winds, most wooden buildings in Miami were either blown down or lost their roofs. Concrete and steel buildings were warped at their bases. While skyscrapers mostly sustained minor damage, the 18-story Meyer-Kiser Building bore considerable damage. The structure reportedly swayed and vibrated precipitously during the storm; eyewitnesses likened it to the Charleston dance. Many of the injuries in the city were due to ballistic fragments of broken roofing including iron sheeting. Other structures across the region sustained significant damage. Strong winds leveled "hundreds" of working-class homes in Hialeah and severely damaged 70% of the town. Winds destroyed the interiors of buildings in Fort Lauderdale, the seat of Broward County, and ripped the roof from the Broward County courthouse. Despite having only 12,000 inhabitants, the town sustained severe damage to 3,500 of its buildings. Nearby, the storm severely damaged the abandoned New River House of Refuge. Cities as far north as Lake Park (then called Kelsey City) and West Palm Beach in Palm Beach County reported many roofs blown off, numerous small buildings destroyed, walls blown down, windows shattered, and trees, shrubs, and other objects torn apart or uprooted. The worst destruction occurred in the poorer, mostly black sections of the towns, where many homes were destroyed.

We had never been through a hurricane in 1926, when we experienced our first one. ... We didn't know that all windows should be covered in a hurricane. ... I was watching as railroad cars were being knocked off the tracks and telegraph poles were snapped like toothpicks. ...[Immediately] almost all the windows on the top floor were broken.

— Floy Cooke Mitchell, wife of former mayor of Boca Raton J. C. Mitchell

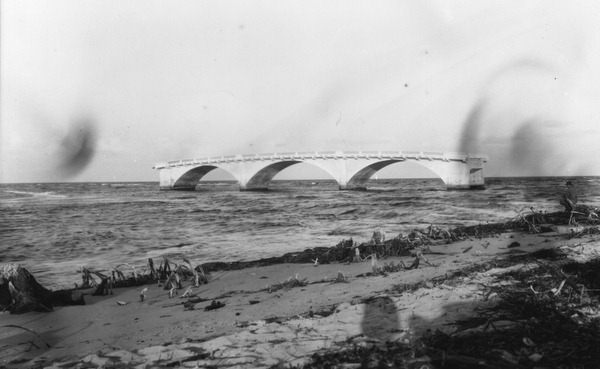
Remains of a bridge at Baker's Haulover Inlet

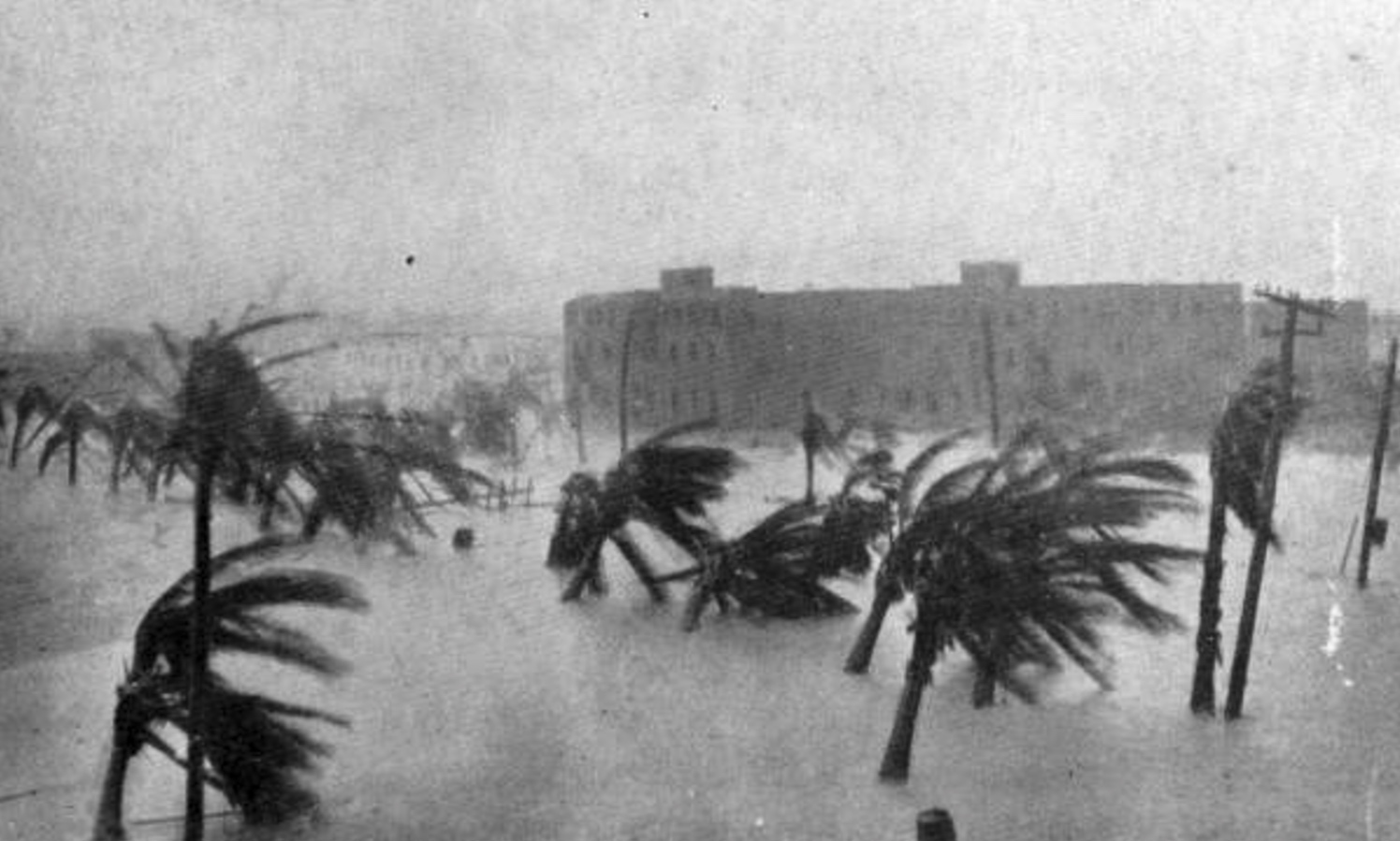
Miami Beach flooded by storm surge during the hurricane

Along the east coast of South Florida, the storm caused widespread, significant beach erosion. At Hillsboro Inlet Light, high tides removed 20 ft (6.1 m) of sand beneath the lighthouse. The hurricane swept away much of State Road A1A in Broward and Miami-Dade Counties. The combined force of waves and storm surge undermined coastal structures that collapsed, including multi-story casinos on Miami Beach, and washed out the coastal bridge on Florida State Road A1A at Baker's Haulover Inlet. In Boca Raton, waves were so large that they rose to the top of the high ridge on the barrier island, though they did not overtop it. High surf also destroyed a casino at the Boca Raton Inlet. "Knee-deep" water east of U.S. Route 1 (Federal Highway) in Boca Raton blocked beach access, but residents waded through. Meanwhile, large waves left much debris and sand drifts several feet deep on State Road A1A in Delray Beach. The waters of the Lake Worth Lagoon overflowed their banks, submerging nearby streets, parks, and golf courses. High tides piled debris on the streets of Palm Beach, caused a beachfront boardwalk to collapse, and exacerbated previous damage from the July hurricane. On Hollywood beach, waves smashed windows and invaded the interior of the Hollywood Beach Hotel. People on the second floor found sand drifts reaching "half way to the ceiling."

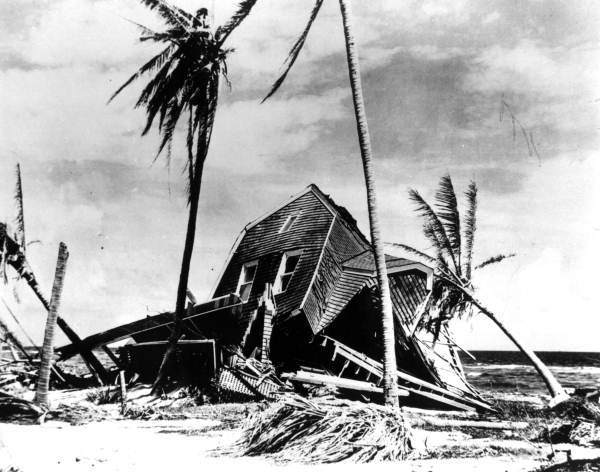
A house destroyed In Miami Beach after the hurricane

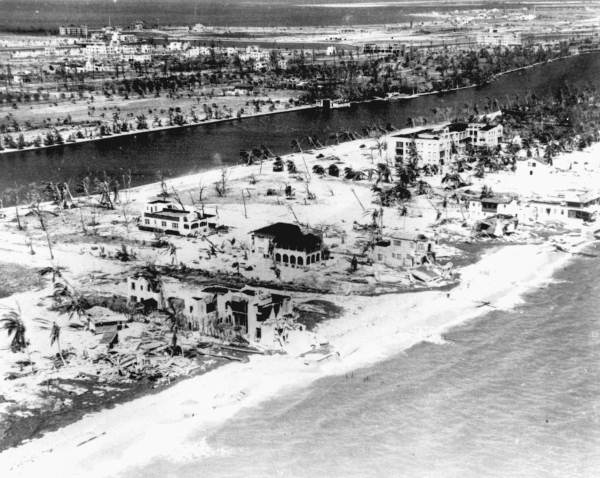
Damage on Miami Beach

The storm also ravaged entertainment venues and historic sites. The storm flattened the Fulford–Miami Speedway in North Miami Beach, which then ceased operation. Winds peeled the roof of the grandstand at Hialeah Race Track into pieces and destroyed the kennels, allowing racing greyhounds to escape. The storm wrecked prominent restaurants and tourist attractions on Miami Beach, including the Million Dollar Pier. Many historic structures throughout South Florida sustained significant damage, including the Barnacle and the Villa Vizcaya, where the yacht Nepenthe and fishing boat Psyche were sunk. The storm damaged the main residence at the Bonnet House—the only hurricane to do so since the latter was first built. No other storm since 1926 caused a similar level of destruction to the property until Hurricane Wilma in 2005.

The storm ruined cultivated areas throughout South Florida. The storm flooded the surrounding citrus crop and agricultural fields south of Miami, particularly near Homestead and Florida City,destroying half of the citrus-bearing trees in the area. Much of the citrus crop in Dania was a total loss as floodwaters submerged the area to depths of 6 ft (1.8 m); flooding lingered for more than a week after the storm.

==== Southwest Florida ====
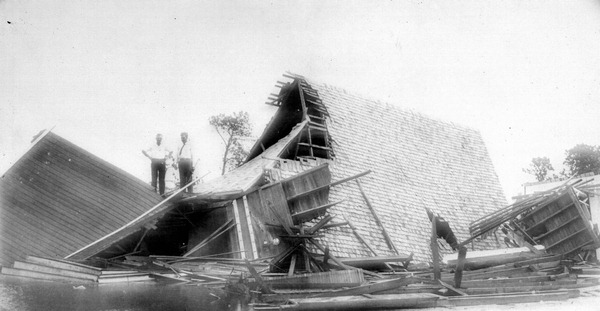
Damage to Knight's Chapel in Nokomis

A storm surge from Lake Okeechobee entirely inundated Clewiston, reportedly leaving numerous bodies along the road connecting the city with Miami. Further inland, the surge burst through frail, earthen, 6-foot-tall (1.8 m) muck dikes, submerging Moore Haven under 13 to 15 ft (4.0 to 4.6 m) of water. Residents scrambled, often unsuccessfully, to safety on rooftops but were swept away by the winds and storm surge. A nearby drainage dam was destroyed, causing additional flooding of the countryside. Most of the city's buildings were swept off of their original foundations. Reports by the Red Cross and local authorities indicated that 150 human corpses were found in Moore Haven alone; their estimates were incomplete as many bodies were never found, reportedly having been swept deep into the Everglades. Estimates of the dead near Lake Okeechobee ranged as high as 300. Two years later, another Category 4 hurricane killed at least 2,500 people along Lake Okeechobee, but mostly affected the eastern shore, leaving Moore Haven largely unscathed.

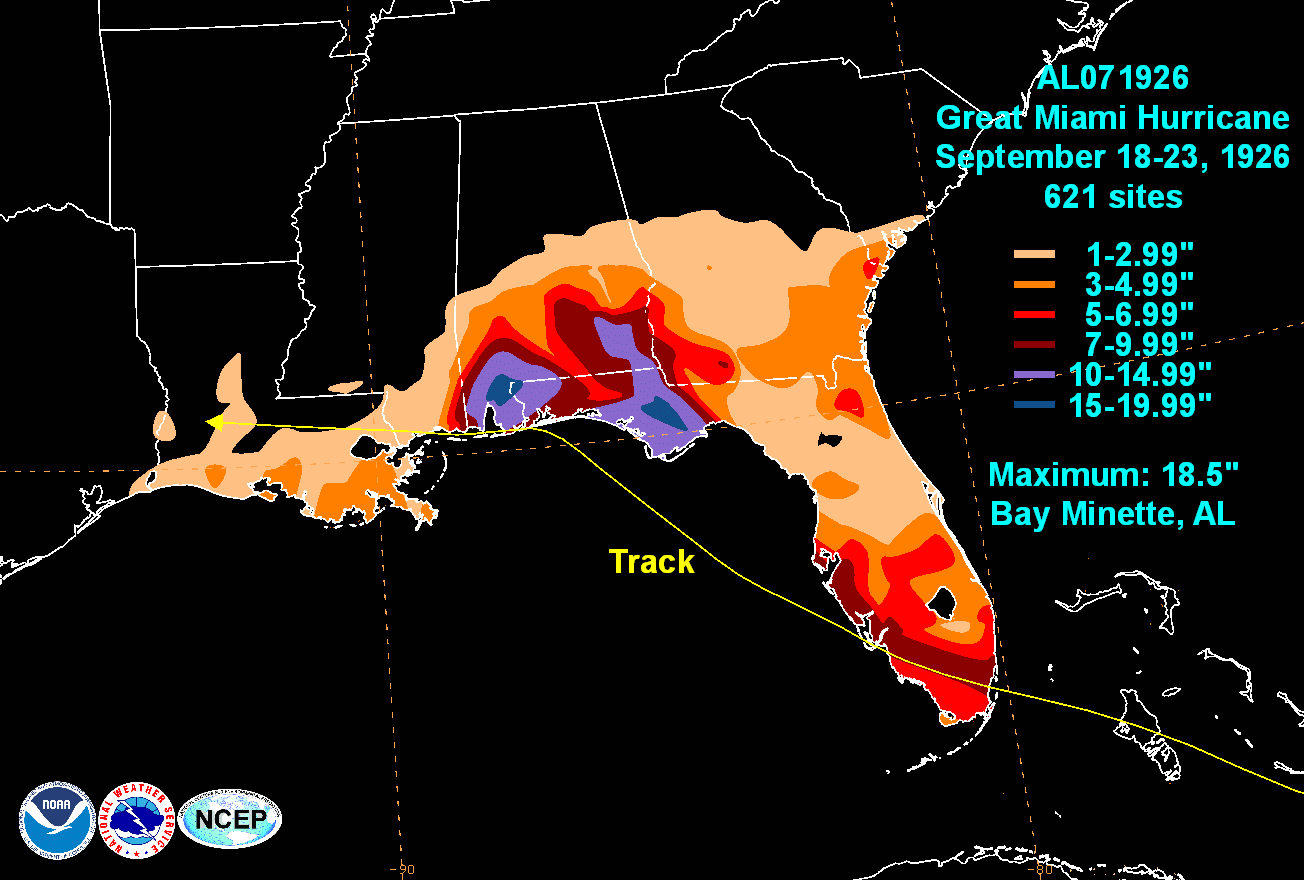
Map of the total rainfall from the hurricane across the Southern United States

The Gulf Coast of the Florida peninsula saw comparatively less damage compared to Greater Miami but still suffered significant impacts. A peak storm tide of 11 to 12 ft (3.4 to 3.7 m) affected Punta Rassa and the islands of Captiva and Sanibel, causing $3,000,000 in flood damage. The storm opened Redfish Pass between Captiva and North Captiva islands. Between Tampa and Naples, strong winds destroyed windows and felled trees and power poles. In Fort Myers, citrus crops sustained some damage and public utilities were put out of commission. Strong winds uprooted trees in St. Petersburg, while heavy rainfall caused flooding in the outlying districts of nearby Tampa. South of the eye, a storm tide of 8 ft (2.4 m) submerged the streets of Everglades City, forcing people into the upper stories of buildings. Homes that were not secured to their foundations floated away on the tide. Tides reached 4 to 5 ft (1.2 to 1.5 m) as far south as Flamingo, sending seaweed, fish, and mud into dwellings. The project headquarters of Poinciana, a development project in the lower Ten Thousand Islands, were destroyed; the project was subsequently abandoned.

==== Elsewhere ====
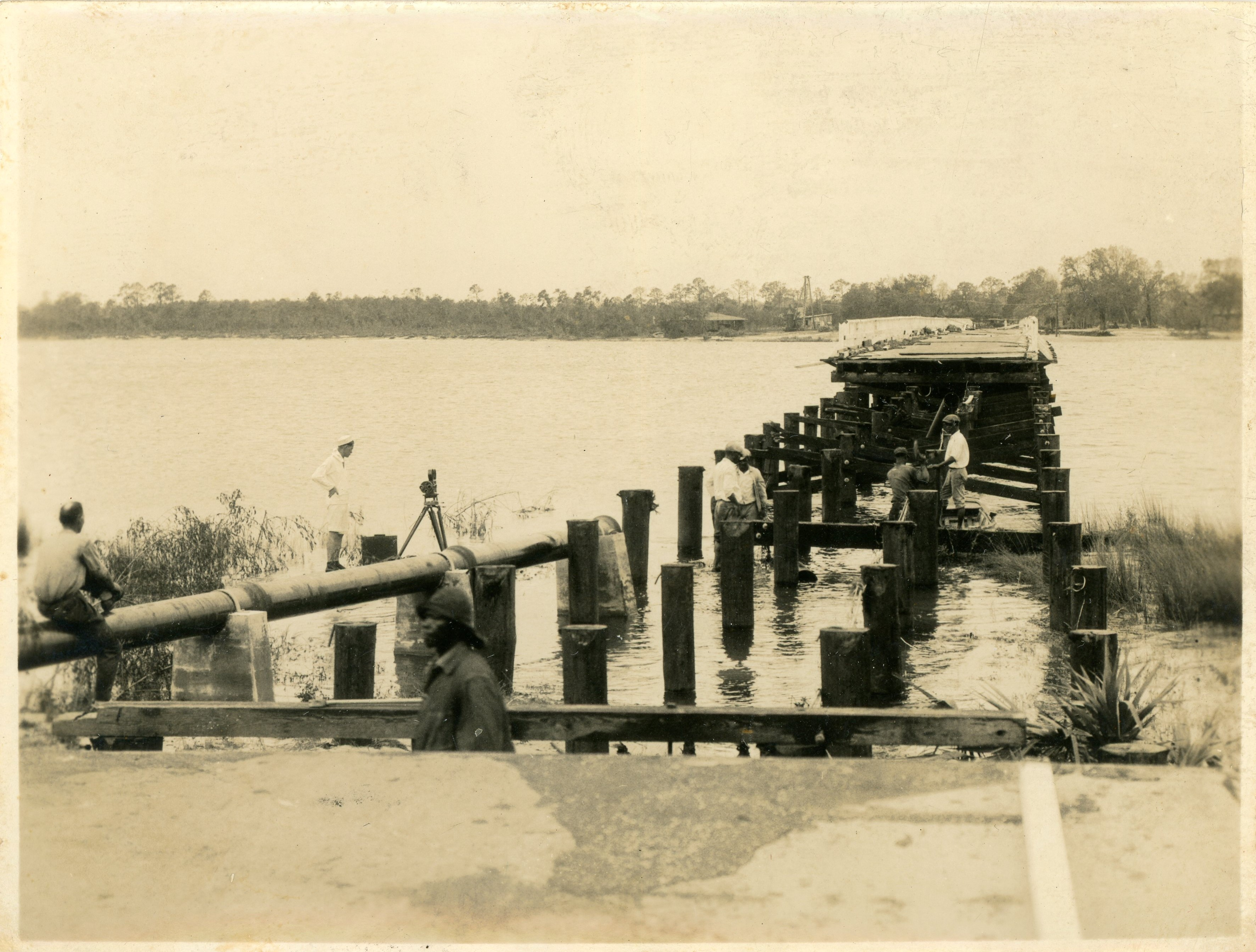
Bridge swept away at Pensacola

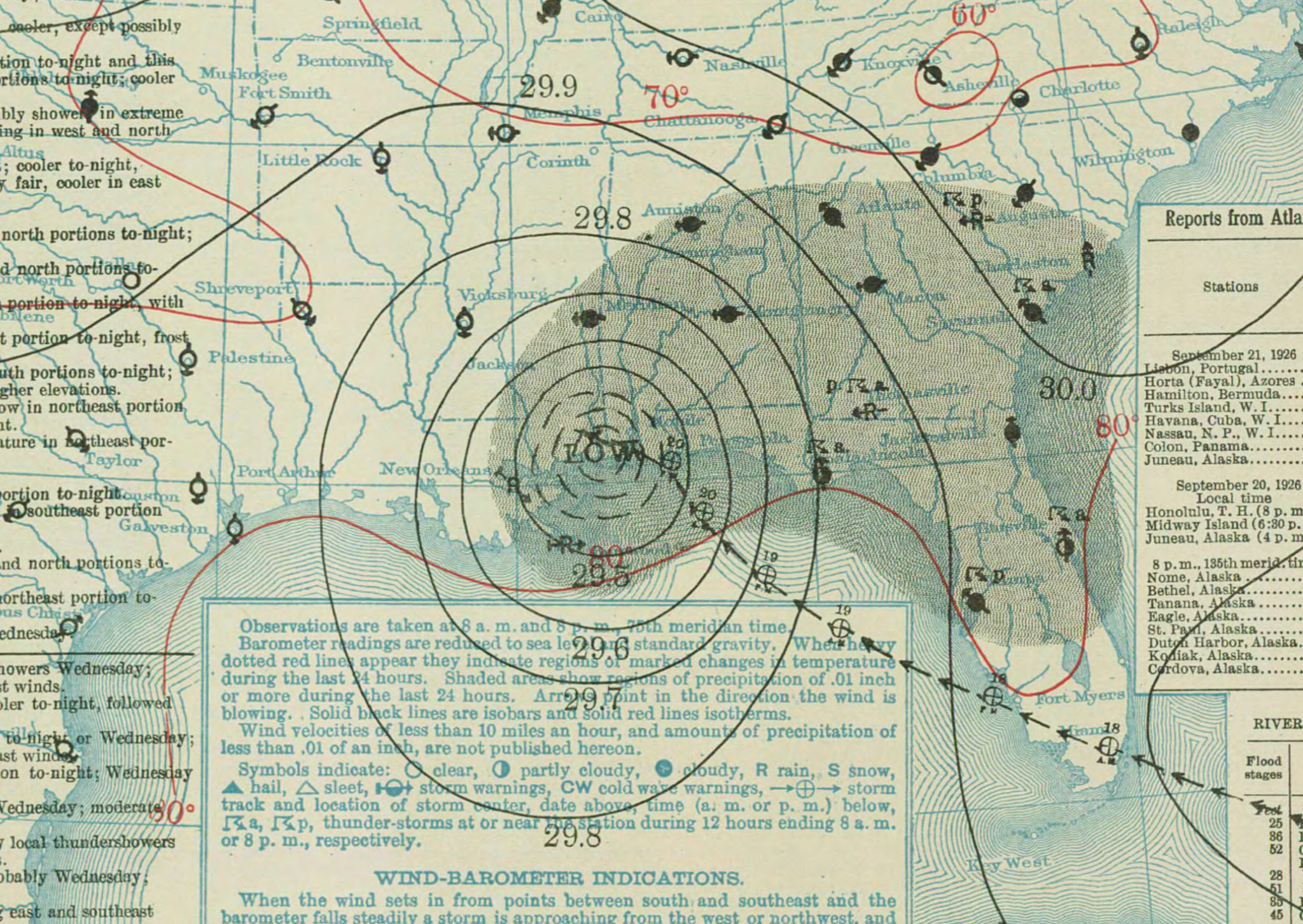
Weather map of the hurricane over Alabama and Mississippi on September 21

Although the hurricane weakened before striking the upper Gulf Coast, its slow movement produced substantial effects to coastal regions between Mobile and Pensacola; these areas experienced heavy damage from wind, rain, and storm surge. Wind records at Pensacola indicate that the city encountered sustained winds of hurricane force for more than 20 hours, including winds above 100 mph (160 km/h) for five hours. The storm tide destroyed nearly all waterfront structures on Pensacola Bay and peaked at 14 ft (4.3 m) near Bagdad, Florida. Rainfall peaked at Bay Minette, Alabama, where 18 1/2 in (470 mm) fell. Judge Jackson, a Sacred Harp singer and composer from Ozark, Alabama, memorialized the storm in the song "Florida Storm", which he published in his 1934 songbook, The Colored Sacred Harp.

== Aftermath ==
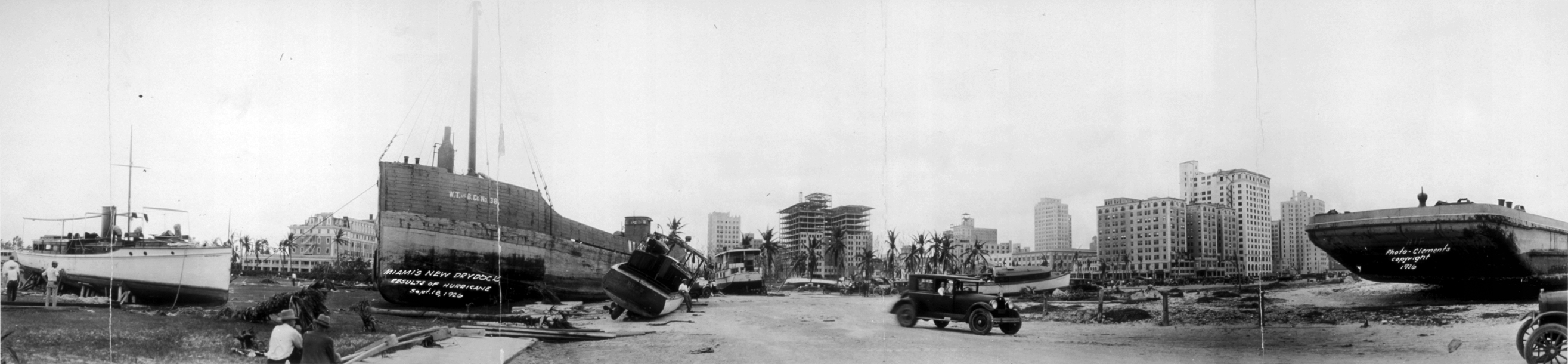
Panoramic view of Downtown Miami after the hurricane, wryly titled "Miami's New Drydock"

The disarray in Miami following the hurricane's passage led to a breakout of looting in the city's African-American districts that resulted in seven arrests. This unrest prompted the declaration of martial law with the swearing-in of 300 special policemen for voluntary duty. Similarly, 200 policemen were placed on duty in Hollywood, Florida. After a survey indicated that the available food and water supplies would only last 30 days, hoarding was banned. Soup kitchens were set up in Miami's business district in order to serve food to the recently displaced and as a source for clean drinking water that was contaminated in other areas. The first aid arriving from outside the impacted areas was a relief train guarded by state militiamen that carted medical staff, medicine, potable water, and other relief supplies into Miami immediately following the storm's passage. Afterwards, then-U.S. president Calvin Coolidge placed the United States Army and Coast Guard on standby should relief efforts necessitate their presence in Florida and the Bahamas. The Red Cross offered its facilities and the Pullman Company offered its resources for use in relief efforts. The National Guard of the United States dispatched several companies of guardsmen to disaster areas following urgent appeals from then-Florida governor John W. Martin. In response to the widespread destruction of buildings on Miami Beach, John J. Farrey was appointed chief building, plumbing and electrical inspector. He initiated and enforced the first building code in the United States, which more than 5,000 US cities duplicated.

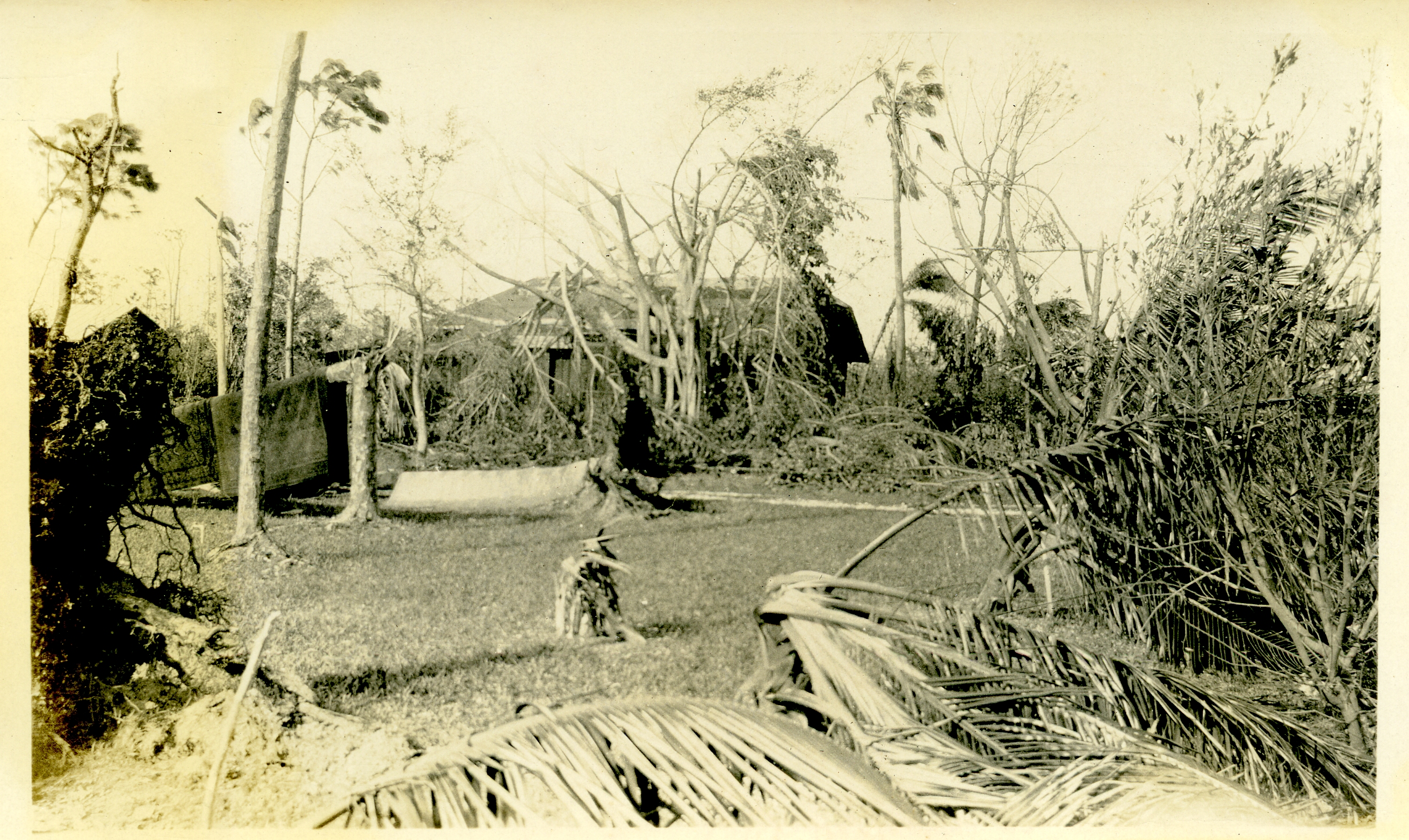
Destruction of vegetation near Miami

According to the American Red Cross, the storm caused 372 fatalities, including 114 from the city of Miami, but these totals apparently do not include deaths outside the United States. Prior to 2003, the National Weather Service had long accepted 243 as the number of deaths, but historical research indicated that this total was far too low. The NWS then updated its totals to reflect the new findings. Even the estimates for the United States are uncertain and vary, since there were many people, especially transients and colored migrants in South Florida, listed as "missing". About 43,000 people were left homeless, mostly in the Miami area. The toll for the storm in the United States was $100 million ($1.82 billion 2026 USD). It is estimated that if an identical storm hit in the year 2005, with modern development and prices, the storm would have caused $140–157 billion in damage ($196 billion in 2016); this would make the storm the costliest on record in the United States, adjusted for inflation, if it were to occur in contemporary times.

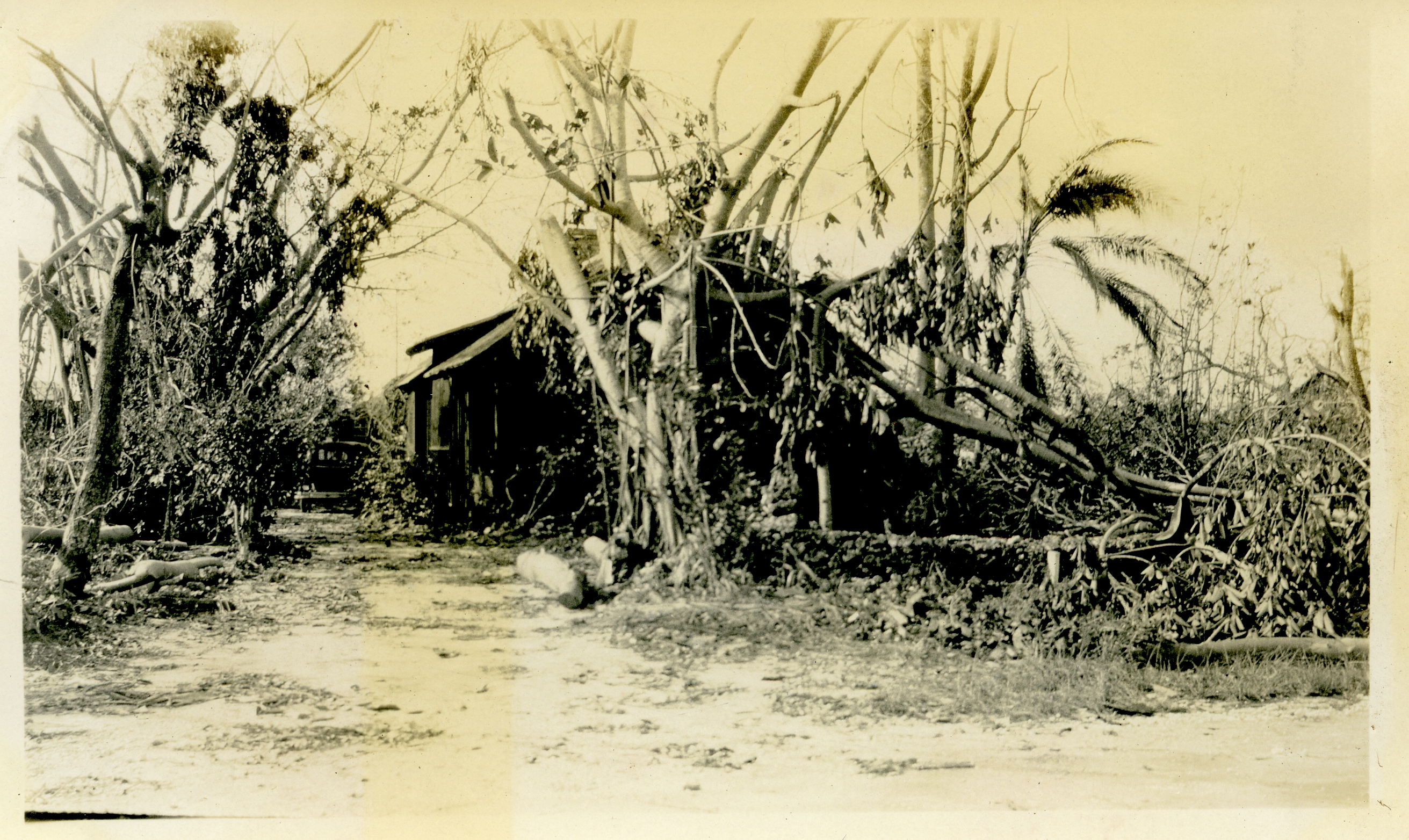
A damaged homesite in the Miami area

Several events, including the sinking of a ship in the Miami harbor and an embargo by the Florida East Coast Railroad before the storm, weakened the Florida land boom of the 1920s in South Florida. However, the storm is considered the final blow to end the boom locally. Thousands of newcomers to Florida left the state and cleared their bank accounts, leaving many banks to the brink of bankruptcy. As a result, the Great Depression of 1929 did not make a great impact to Florida unlike the rest of the country. Many planned developments, which had fallen into deadlock due to insufficient resources, were abandoned due to the economic effects of the hurricane. In Boca Raton, for instance, one planned community by Addison Mizner, called Villa Rica, was destroyed by the hurricane and never rebuilt. South Florida did not achieve full economic recovery until the 1940s.

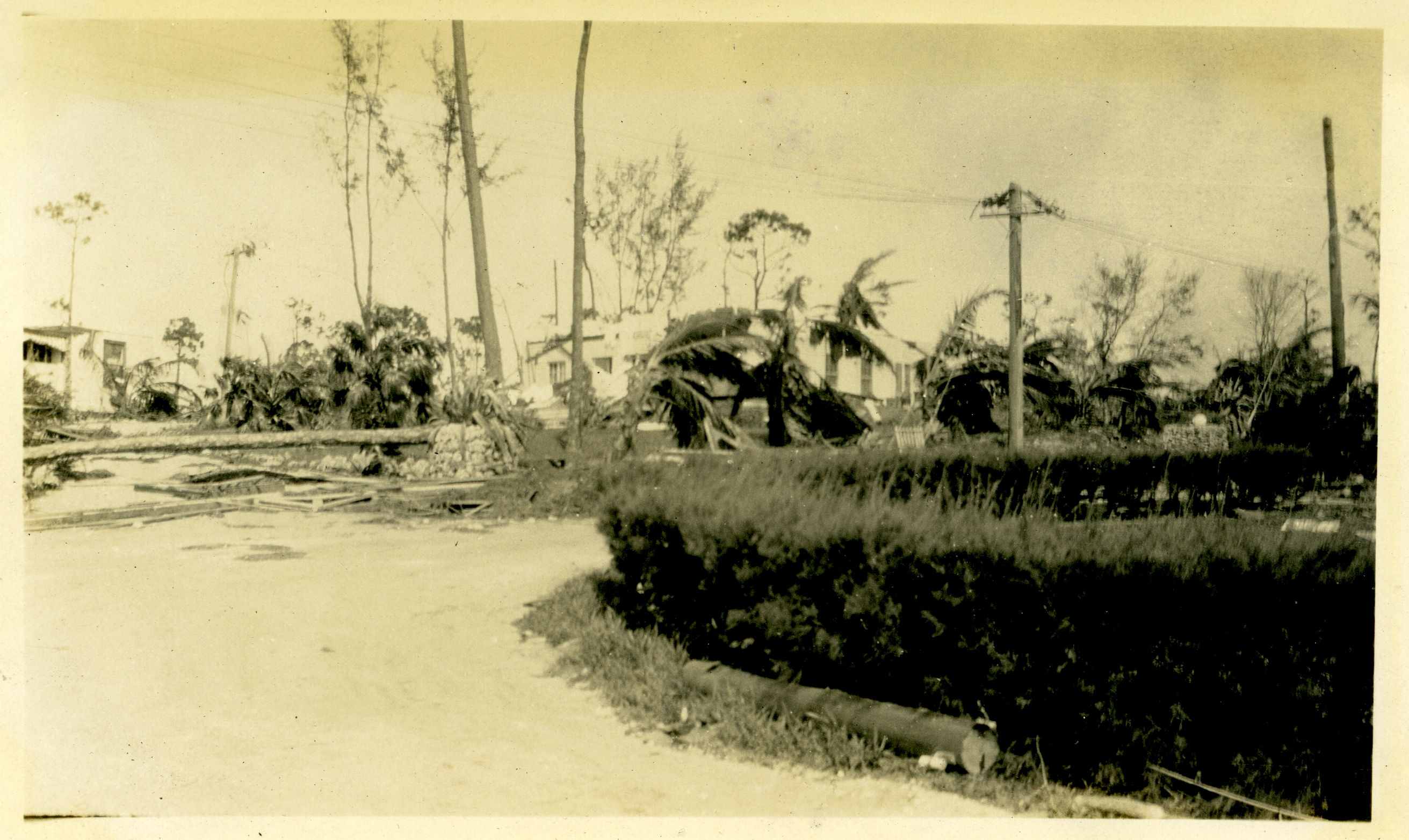
Downed tree near Miami

The University of Miami, located in Coral Gables, had been founded in 1925 and opened its doors for the first time just days after the hurricane passed. The university's athletic teams were nicknamed the Hurricanes in memory of this catastrophe. The school's mascot is Sebastian the Ibis, an ibis. The ibis is a small white bird that can be seen around South Florida, including on the UM campus. According to folklore, the ibis is the last bird to leave before a hurricane strikes and the first to return after the storm, hence its selection for the school mascot.

== See also ==
- Hurricane Andrew – caused unprecedented destruction in Greater Miami before striking Louisiana
- Hurricane Harvey – the costliest tropical cyclone in American history, noted for floods in Greater Houston
- 1947 Fort Lauderdale hurricane – intense hurricane whose effects were lessened in southern Florida thanks to improved warning systems
- 1945 Homestead hurricane – tracked across the Bahamas before curving into Florida and causing extensive damage
- 1928 Okeechobee hurricane – third-deadliest tropical cyclone in American history, struck nearly two years to date after the 1926 hurricane

== Bibliography ==
- Barnes, Jay (1998). Florida's Hurricane History (1st ed.). Chapel Hill, North Carolina: UNC Press. ISBN 0-8078-2443-7 – via Internet Archive.
- Beard, Karen (Winter 2006). "Letter from the Executive Director". Bonnet House Museum & Gardens: 1.
- Cunningham, Dennis (2008). "The Big Blow: Broward County and the 1926 Hurricane". Broward Legacy. Vol. 28, no. 1. Broward County Historical Commission. pp. 1–28. Archived from the original on 6 January 2019.
- Doyle, Larry J.; Sharma, Dinesh C.; Hine, Albert C.; Pilkey, Orrin Jr. H.; Neal, William J.; Pilkey Sr., Orrin H.; Martin, David; Belknap, Daniel F. (1984). Living with the West Florida Shore. Duke University Press. ISBN 978-0-8223-0517-0.
- Duedall, Iver W.; Williams, John M. (2002). Florida Hurricanes and Tropical Storms, 1871–2001. University Press of Florida. ISBN 978-0-8130-2494-3.
- Edic, Robert F. (1996). Fisherfolk of Charlotte Harbor, Florida. Gainesville, Florida: Institute of Archaeology and Paleoenvironmental Studies. ISBN 978-1-881448-04-4.
- Gillis, Susan (2007). Boomtime Boca: Boca Raton in the 1920s. Charleston, South Carolina: Arcadia Publishing. ISBN 978-0-7385-4443-4.
- Grazulis, Thomas P. (1993). Significant Tornadoes 1680–1991: A Chronology and Analysis of Events. St. Johnsbury, Vermont: The Tornado Project of Environmental Films. ISBN 978-1-879362-03-1.
- Harris, Margaret Garnett (1990). Pioneer Daughter. Hypoluxo, Florida: Star Publishing.
- Hortt, M. A. (1953). Gold Coast Pioneer. New York: Exposition Press. ASIN B003VZWJQY.
- "In the wake of Hugo: The '26 storm revisited" (PDF). South Florida History Magazine. No. 4. 1989. pp. 10–13. Archived from the original (PDF) on November 16, 2017. A first hand account written in 1926.
- Kleinberg, Elliot (2003). Black Cloud: the Deadly Hurricane of 1928. New York: Carroll & Graf. ISBN 978-0-7867-1386-8.
- Lee, Harris D. (1963). Characteristics of the Hurricane Storm Surge (PDF) (Technical report). Washington, D.C.: United States Weather Bureau. p. 139. 48. Archived from the original (PDF) on December 24, 2016.
- Linehan, Mary Collar; Nelson, Mary Watts (1994). Pioneer Days on the Shores of Lake Worth, 1873–1893. St. Petersburg, Florida: Southern Heritage Press. ISBN 978-0-941072-14-4.
- McGarry, Carmen C. (1997). Magnificent Mile: A History of Hillsboro Beach. Morriston, Florida: RitAmelia Press. ISBN 978-0-9641216-3-8.
- Mitchell, Floy C. (1978). "Mrs Mitchell's Memories of Early Boca Raton" (PDF). The Spanish River Papers. 6 (2). Boca Raton Historical Society: 3–19.
- Neely, Wayne (2009). The Great Bahamian Hurricanes of 1926: the Story of Three of the Greatest Hurricanes to Ever Affect the Bahamas. New York City: iUniverse. ISBN 978-1-4401-5174-3 – via Google Books.
- Neely, Wayne (2019). The Greatest and Deadliest Hurricanes to Impact the Bahamas. Cheyenne, Wyoming: UrLink. ISBN 978-1-64753-121-8.
- Pfost, Russell L. (2003). "Reassessing the Impact of Two Historical Florida Hurricanes". Bulletin of the American Meteorological Society. 84 (10): 1367–72. Bibcode:2003BAMS...84.1367P. doi:10.1175/BAMS-84-10-1367.
- Simms, Louis M. (1984). In Place of Pearls: A Brief History of Deerfield Beach. Rimus Books. ASIN B0007B2CVW.
- Simmons, Glen; Ogden, Laura (1998). Gladesmen: Gator Hunters, Moonshiners, and Skiffers. Gainesville, Florida: University Press of Florida. ISBN 978-0-8130-1573-6.
- U.S. Weather Bureau (1926). Written at Jacksonville, Florida. "The Florida Hurricane, September 17–20, 1926". Climatological Data. 30 (9). Washington, D.C.: United States Department of Agriculture: 39–40.
