= Captiva Current =

- Type: Weekly newspaper
- Format: Broadsheet
- Owner: Breeze Newspapers
- Founded: 1990, 29 years ago
- Language: English
- Headquarters: 14051 Jetport Loop, Fort Myers, FL 33913
- Sister newspapers: Sanibel-Captiva Islander, Island Reporter
- OCLC number: 36863760
- Website: http://breezenewspapers.com/news/captivacurrent.asp

The Captiva Current is a newspaper that circulates around the island of Captiva off of Florida's southwest coast. The first issue was printed in August 1990 starring the chief of the island's fire department on the front page. It is printed weekly on Thursdays as a section of the Island Reporter.

The Captiva Current, along with nine other papers across southwest Florida, is owned by Breeze Newspapers. With their headquarters in Fort Myers, Florida, Breeze Newspapers cover from Captiva Island to as far east as Lehigh Acres. The current publisher of this newspaper is Scott Blonde, and the executive editor is Valarie Harring.

== Coverage ==
The Captiva Current covers anything occurring on the island, including changes on the real estate market, business activities, and local development. Some other sections this newspaper includes are island history, arts, and profiles of interesting island residents. The sections in the paper are Your Community, News, Business, Opinion, Lifestyles, Sports, Classifieds. Some of the more significant stories this paper has covered include those having to do with incorporating as a city, beach restoration, and laying telephone and utility lines due to Hurricane Charley in 2004.

== Awards ==
Breeze Newspapers has won several awards, including for advertising and Best Editorial from The Community Papers of Florida. Captiva Current's sister newspaper, The Island Reporter, won the Overall Graphic Design category from the Florida Press Association.

== See also ==
- Captiva Current main page
- Breeze Newspaper website
- To contact Breeze Newspapers
- Captiva Island Historical Society
