= Captiva Pass =

Coordinates: 26°36′34″N 82°13′19″W

Captiva Pass is the strait that separates North Captiva Island from Cayo Costa Island in Lee County, Florida.

The pass connects the Gulf of Mexico to the west with Pine Island Sound to the east. It is a noted saltwater fishing destination in southwest Florida.
