= Blind pass =

Blind pass may refer to:

- Blind Pass, the strait that separates Captiva Island from Sanibel Island in Lee County, Florida
- Blind pass (basketball)
