= South Seas Island Resort =

Resort in Florida, United States

Coordinates: 26°31′31″N 82°11′27″W

South Seas Island Resort is a 330-acre (1.3 km^{2}) resort located on the shores of the Gulf of Mexico in the community of Captiva in Lee County, Florida. The original resort, South Seas Plantation, was opened in 1946 as a fishing resort by Clarence Chadwick, following a dry hurricane (salt-water storm surge kills the plants) which ended commercial farming on the island. Chadwick owned much of Captiva and portions of nearby Sanibel, making his fortune inventing the Checkprinter in the 1920s. His heirs sold the property to Mariner Properties in 1966, which began the modern era of the resort. The original Plantation house, suffering from termites and wood rot, was demolished in the 1990s.

In 2004 South Seas was seriously damaged by Hurricane Charley, and was renovated and reconstructed in the two following years. South Seas Resort is managed by Interstate Hotels & Resorts, the largest management company of independent hotels in the world.

The resort was closed for 18 months after Hurricane Charley and reopened slowly in March 2006.

In 2021, Timbers Company, Wheelock Street Capital and The Ronto Group have jointly acquired South Seas Island Resort.

In 2022, the resort was once again devastated when Hurricane Ian made landfall there.

== Onsite Dining ==
South Seas Island Resort has a variety of dining options. The Crooked Snook Tiki Bar, Haborside Bar and Grill, The Pointe, Scoops & Slices, and Attitudes Beach Bar/Latitudes Food Shack are located at the resort's north end.

Doc Ford’s Rum Bar & Grille, a popular area restaurant, is located near the entrance and open to the public. Every Tuesday, November through April, the resort hosts the Captiva Farmers Market, near the South Seas entrance.

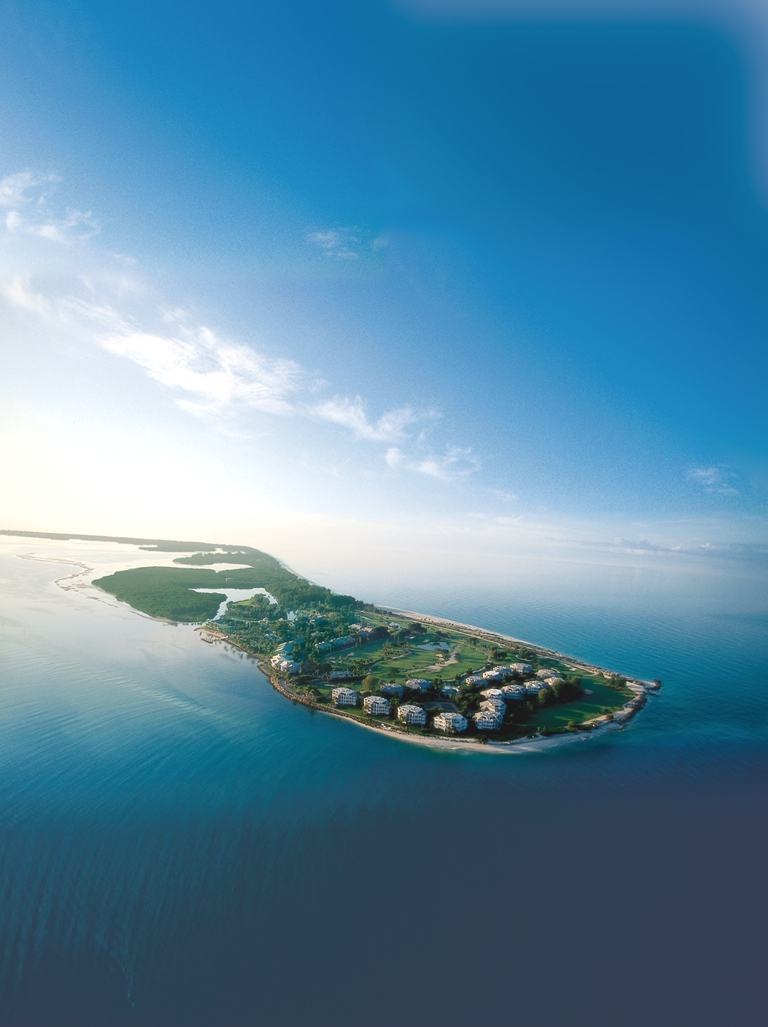
South Seas Island Resort - 2.5 miles of pristine beach on Captiva Island, Florida

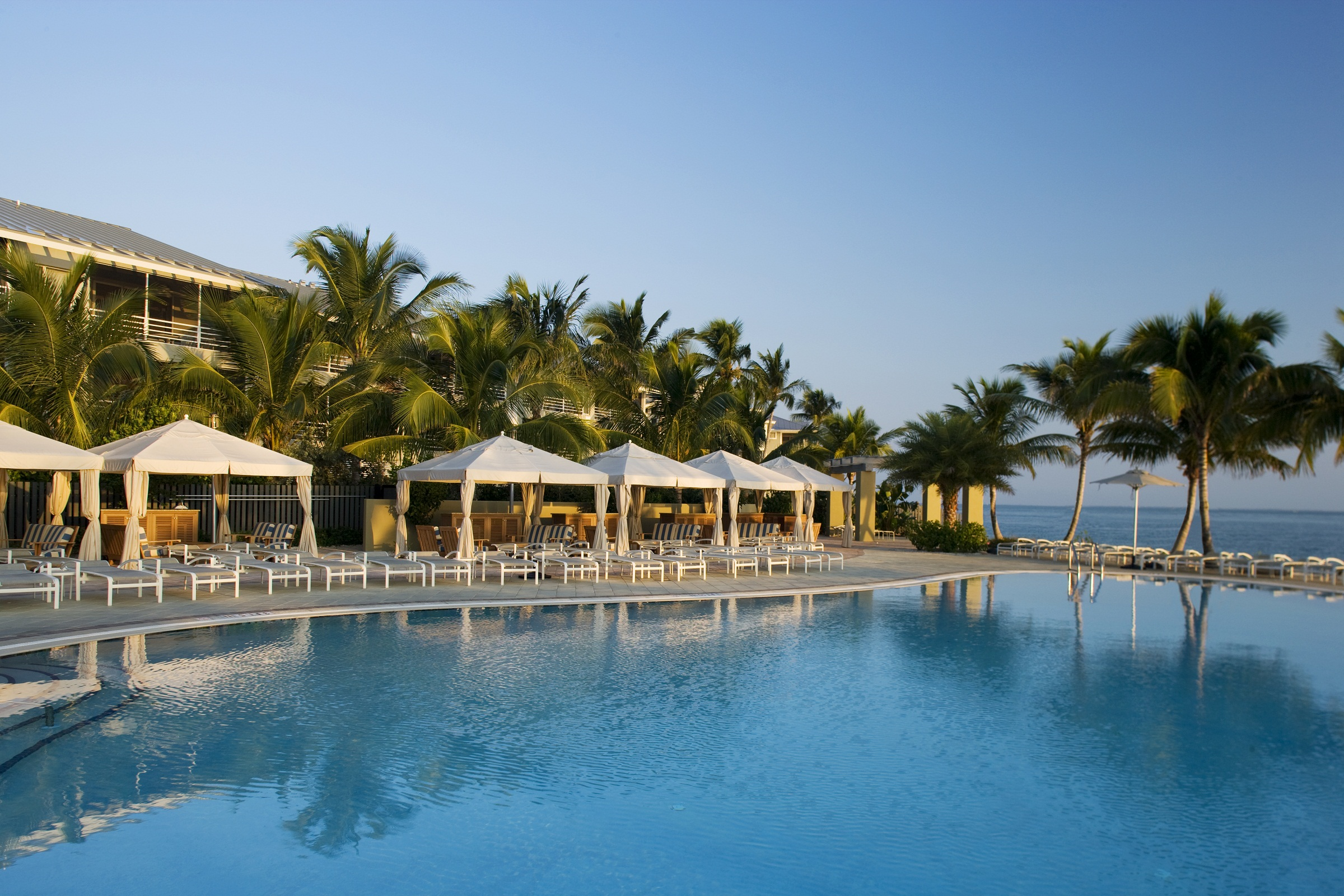
South Seas Island Resort -on Captiva Island, Florida
