= Blind Pass =

Strait in Lee County, Florida

Coordinates: 26°28′33″N 82°10′41″W

Blind Pass is the strait that separates Captiva Island from Sanibel Island in Lee County, Florida.

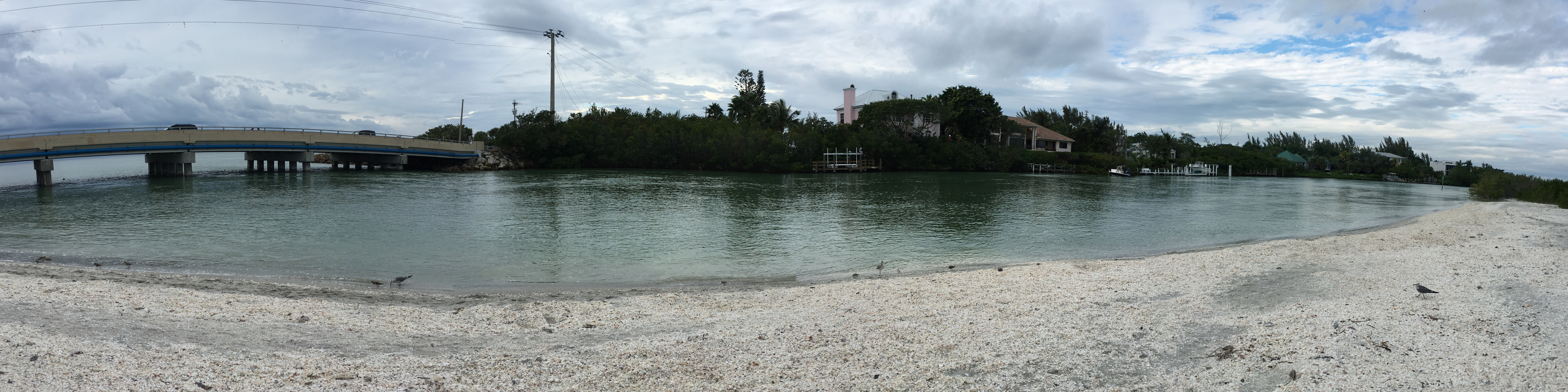
Blind Pass from Sanibel Island looking towards Captiva Island with Blind Pass Bridge at left
