= Redfish Pass =

Coordinates: 26°33.19′N 82°11.92′W

Redfish Pass is a strait in Florida that connects Pine Island Sound with the Gulf of Mexico. It also separates Captiva Island on the south from North Captiva Island on the north. The pass was created by the hurricane of 1921 which divided the once larger Captiva Island. It is named after the many redfish caught in its channel soon after formation, and remains a popular sports fishing destination in Southwest Florida.
