= Cayo Costa State Park =

State park in Florida, United States

- IUCN category IV (habitat/species management area)
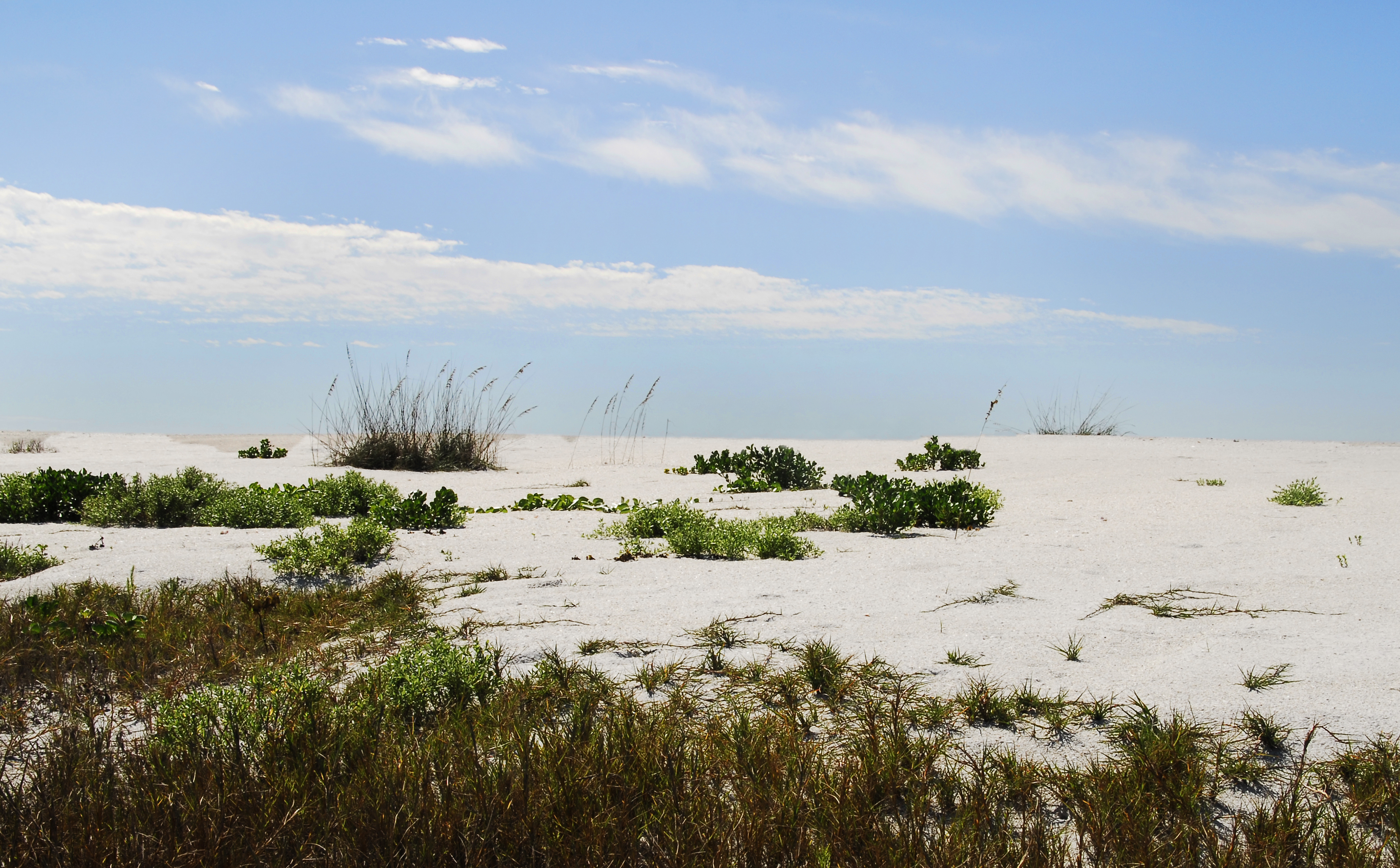
- Beachfront landscape in the park

- Location within Florida Location within the United States
- Interactive map of Cayo Costa State Park
- Location: Lee County, Florida, United States
- Nearest city: Boca Grande, Florida
- Coordinates: 26°40′19″N 82°14′49″W
- Area: 2,506 acres (10 km^{2})
- Governing body: Florida Department of Environmental Protection

Cayo Costa State Park is a state park in the U.S. state of Florida, on Cayo Costa (formerly known as La Costa Island or Padilla Rancho), an island directly south of Boca Grande (Gasparilla Island) and just north of North Captiva Island, approximately 12 miles (19 km) west of Cape Coral. The park is accessible only by charter boat (with or without captain), private boat, or ferry.

== History ==
Cayo Costa was occupied by Calusa people until about 1700. Native Americans built a number of shell mounds on the island. Starting early in the 18th century, fishermen from Cuba began establishing ranchos, stations for catching and processing fish for the Havana market, along the southwest coast of the Florida peninsula from Tampa Bay to the Caloosahatchee River, possibly including on Cayo Costa. The ranchos operated through the period of British rule of Florida (1763–1783), the second period of Spanish rule (1783–1821), and into the period of American rule, until they were forced out during the Second Seminole War.

Tervio (Tariva, Toribio) Padilla, commonly known as "Captain Pappy", settled on Cayo Costa in the second half of the 19th century. Born in the Canary Islands, Padilla became a U.S. citizen in 1862, while a resident of Key West. Padilla operated a rancho on Cayo Costa where he and his workers caught and processed fish for the Cuban market. A cemetery on the island holds the graves of Padilla and his wife, as well as of approximately 30 Cuban fishermen who died in a 1910 hurricane.

In the early 1900s, about 20 fishing families lived on the island, which had a school, post office and grocery store.

Cayo Costa State Park suffered two major hurricane landfalls in recent history. On August 13, 2004, Hurricane Charley made direct landfall on Cayo Costa as a Category 4 storm. Then, on September 28, 2022, Hurricane Ian also made direct landfall on Cayo Costa as a Category 4 storm.

== Geography ==
Cayo Costa Island is one of a chain of barrier islands that shelter Charlotte Harbor and Pine Island Sound. The park contains nine miles (14 km) of soft white sandy beaches and 2,506 acres (10 km^{2}) of pine forests, oak-palm hammocks, and mangrove swamps.

== Fauna ==
A variety of wildlife can be seen in Cayo Costa State Park. Among the most looked-for animals are sea turtles. There are four species found on the island: the loggerhead (Caretta caretta), hawksbill (Eremochelys imbriata), green (Chelonia mydas), and Kemp's ridley (Lepidochelys kempii). Cayo Costa has many volunteers who check the entire nine-mile beach each morning during sea turtle nesting season (during the months of March through October in southwest Florida) in order to find nests and document them. The loggerhead turtle is found far more than the others, and the green turtle is a distant second. The loggerhead turtle and green turtle's eggs have the most diverse niches. Their niches rely on climate and weather which allow the eggs to survive on land and eventually hatch. Cayo Costa State Park is a major nesting site for sea turtles in Florida. These nests are protected by Florida State Parks and are regulated by volunteers and staff. The nests are patrolled and marked off so that guests can avoid interrupting them.

Another species found on the island is the common raccoon (Procyon lotor). These animals are frequent predators of sea turtle eggs during nesting season. The eggs are also threatened by foxes, ants, ghost crabs, high tide, and looting humans.

The West Indian manatee (Trichechus manatus) is also found coming up to the island beaches. This is considered an endangered animal, but the population is currently growing. They can be seen from the beach or near the canals and docks of the island. The West Indian manatee is found in Florida and Puerto Rico. Although they are part of the same species, there is significant genetic diversity between the two populations.

The bottlenose dolphin (Tursiops truncatus) can also be seen jumping, swimming, and playing along all nine miles of beaches on the island.

Snowy egrets (Egretta thula) can be found on the island. They usually stay near the beaches. They are a small white heron with long, slender black legs and yellow feet. Both sexes of the snowy egret have the same features, even during the breeding season.

The southern bald eagle (Haliaeetus leucocephalus) can be found flying about the island or sitting on high trees. This is another threatened species. The eagles eat a variety of animals, but prefer fish. They scavenge and steal food when they are able to, and hunt for live prey only as a last resort.

The Eastern Coachwhip (Masticophis flagellum flagellum) is a docile and flighty snake that can be found all around the island. They are very long snakes, reaching over eight feet long, despite being very slender. They can be found on the ground and in shrubbery. They are very quick snakes, moving at about 3 miles per hour, and eat insects, lizards, birds, and other snakes. Coachwhips on Cayo Costa are tan, and may be seen pointing their heads out of bushes and grass. The snakes are not aggressive, and do not chase or whip people.

== Flora ==
The mother-in-law's tongue (Sansevieria trifasciata) is found in the state park. This plant is most commonly seen as a house plant, but this invasive species came from one of the houses on the island and has spread widely. Staff is currently trying to rid the island of this invasive plant.

The resurrection fern (Pleopeltis polypodioides) is found growing on trees throughout Cayo Costa. It is an epiphyte that turns brown and curls up its leaves when dehydrated. When the plant receives water or rain, the plant will "come back to life" and reappear green and alive.

Seagrape (Coccoloba uvifera) is found at Cayo Costa. The fruit appears in the summer time during the wet season. It starts out as a bright green grape then ripens to a purplish color. The fruit mainly consists of a large seed with little flesh. It is well known among locals, who make jellies or wines from the grapes. This plant is native to South Florida and the Caribbean. This plant can grow up to fifty feet tall, and is often found close to the ocean because it is relatively salt-tolerant.

== Recreational activities ==
Activities include hiking, off-road bicycling, swimming, kayaking, snorkeling, picnicking, fishing, shelling, wildlife viewing, camping, and sunbathing.

== Amenities ==
Amenities include boat slips, beaches, hiking trails, picnic pavilions, 12 primitive camping cabins and bath house/restrooms. The park offers a small nature center/gift shop with nature exhibits as well as items for sale. Cayo Costa has bikes available for half-day and full-day rentals.

There are 12 primitive cabins and 30 tent sites available for camping in the park, each with its own picnic table and fire pit/ground grill. Boat slips are available for those who wish to camp aboard their boats.

Florida state parks are open between 8 AM and sundown every day of the year, including holidays.

== Wildlife gallery ==
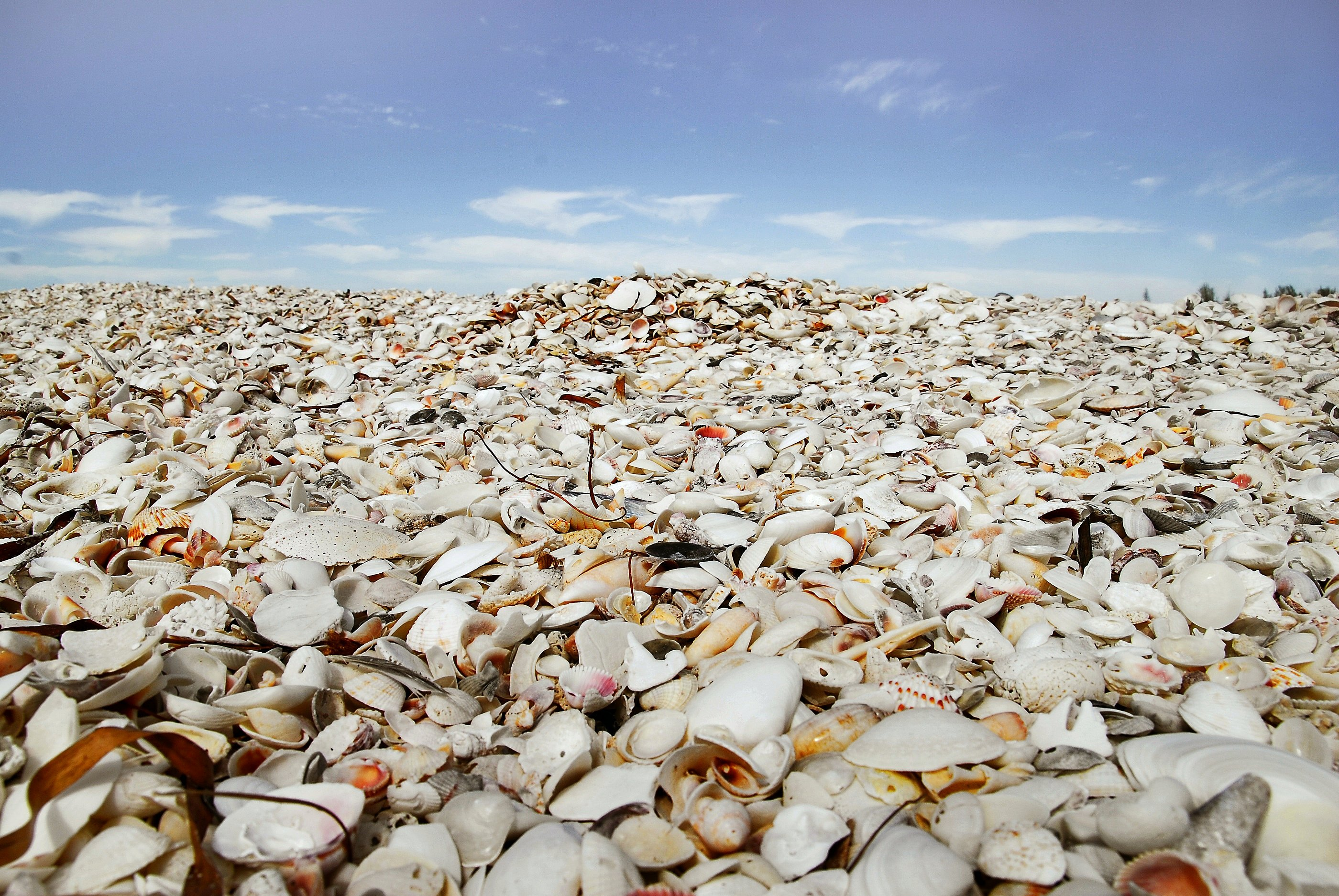
Shells

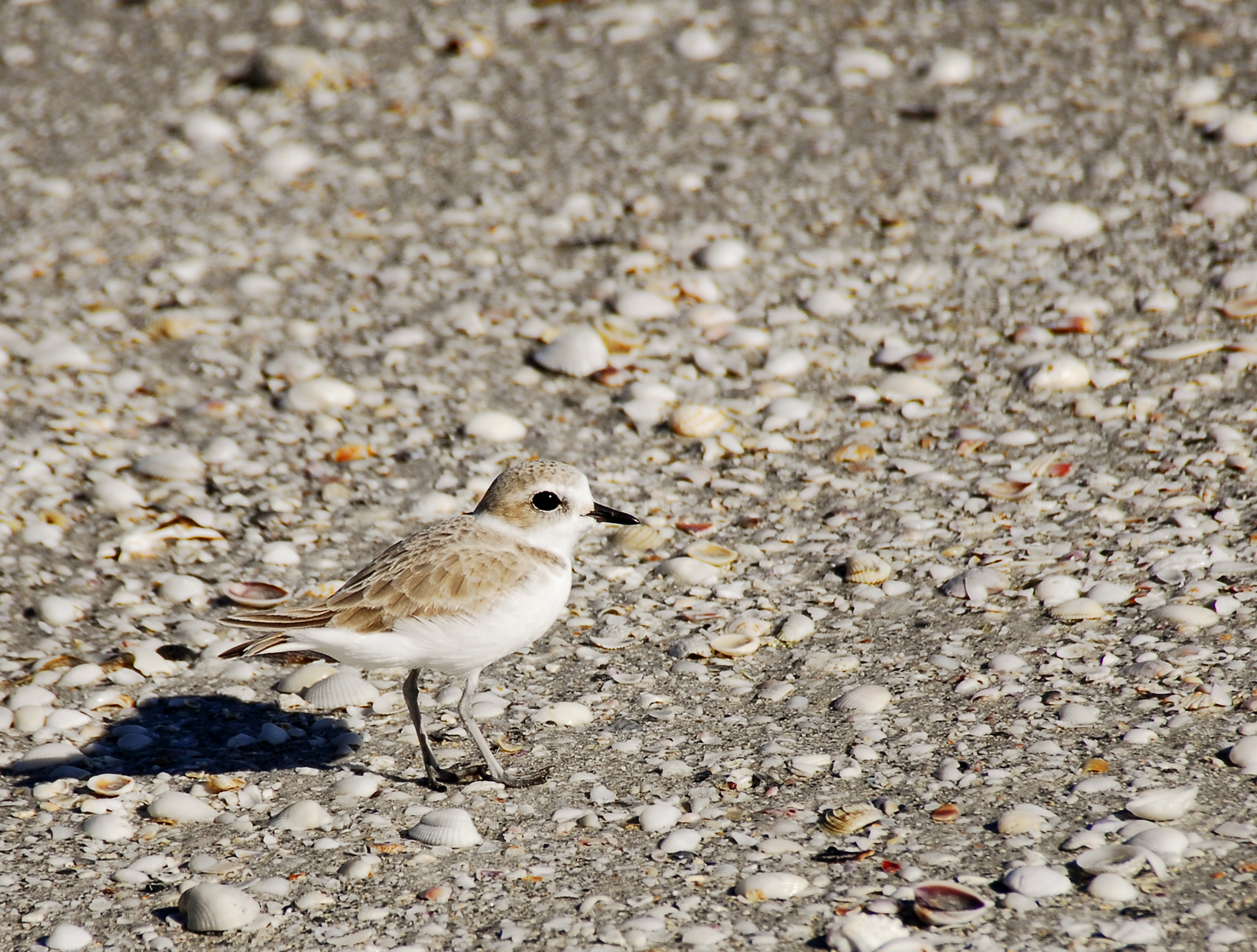
Little sanderling

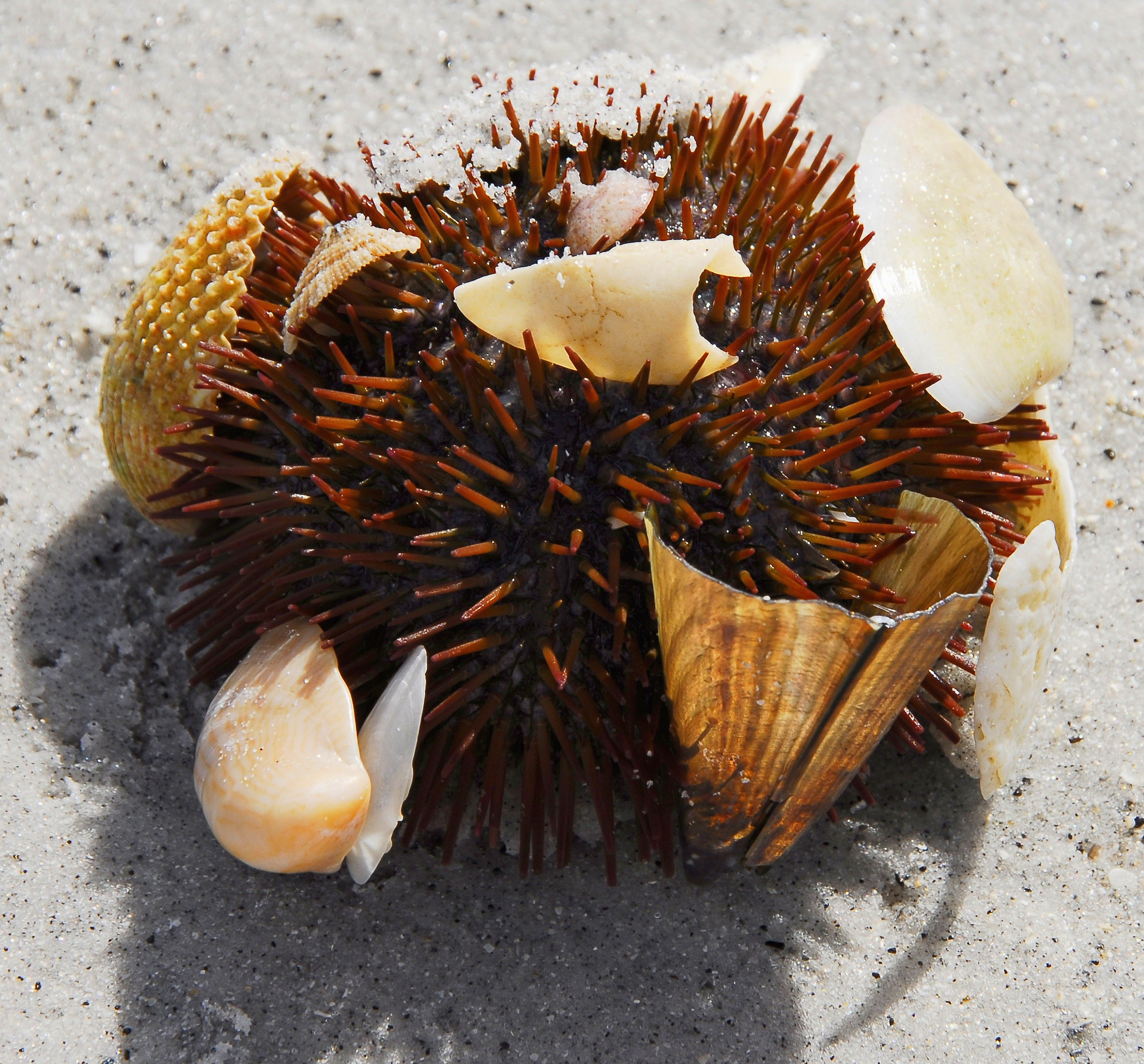
Live sea urchin with shells

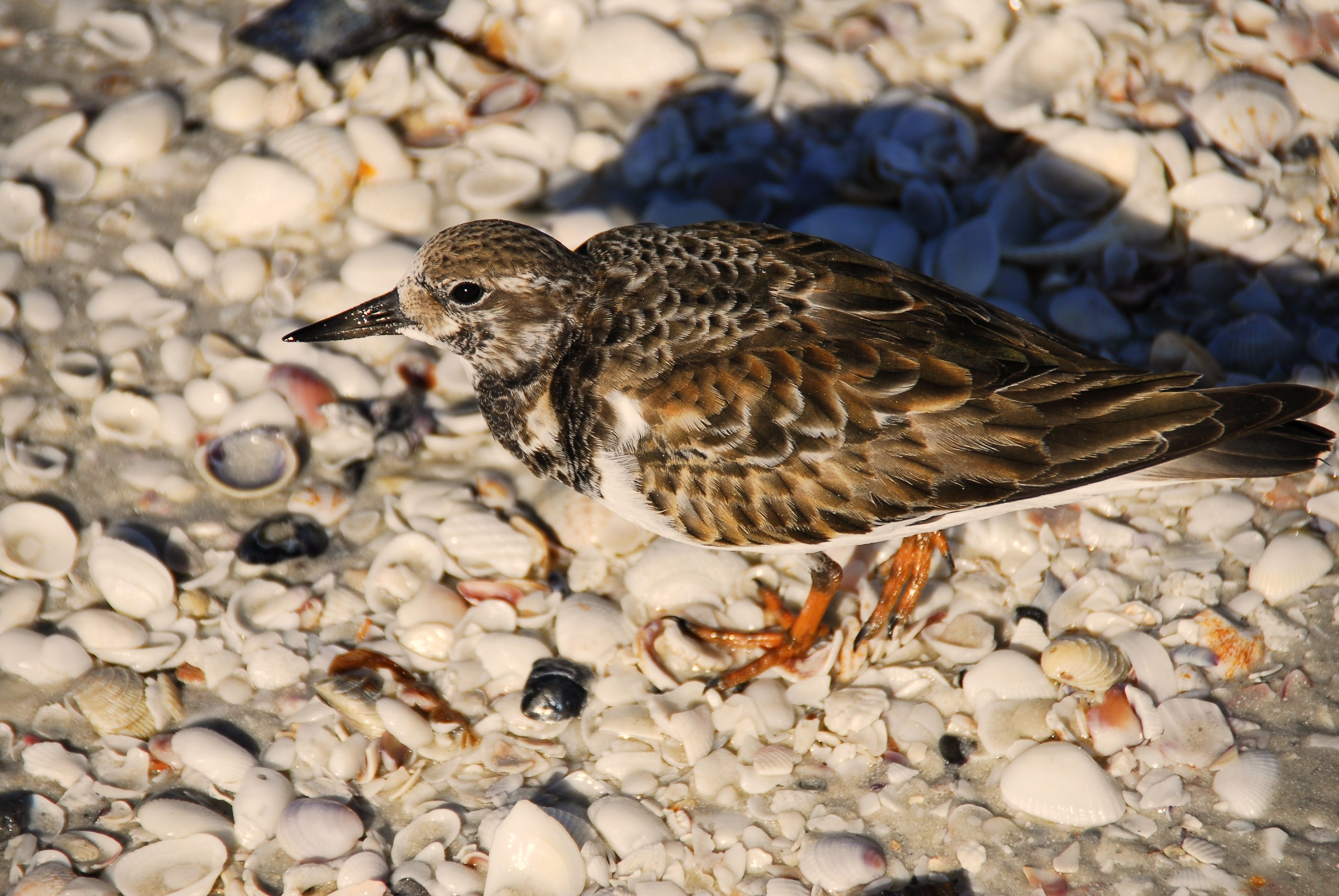
Ruddy turnstone
