= North Captiva Island =

Island in the United States of America

- North Captiva Island North Captiva Island (the Caribbean)

Geography
- Location: Lee County, Florida
- Coordinates: 26.590599°N 82.2155°W
- Adjacent to: Gulf of Mexico

Administration
- United States
- State: Florida
- County: Lee

North Captiva Island is an island in Lee County in Southwest Florida, located just offshore in the Gulf of Mexico. It lies just north of Captiva Island, separated by a channel called Redfish Pass, which was created in a 1921 hurricane. It lies just south of Cayo Costa Island, separated by Captiva Pass.

Like Captiva and Sanibel Islands, North Captiva is a barrier island to Pine Island (to the east of Captiva and north of Sanibel), and is very narrow. There is no automobile access to the island and electric golf carts are the primary means of transport.

== Development ==
Development of the island began in the 1960s, but was slow due to the absence of electric service and the difficulty on transporting building materials to the island. Commercial electric and phone service was established in the mid 1980s. The island Upper Captiva community has about 300 homes built and 300 vacant lots. About half of the island is owned by the State of Florida and is part of a state park. All other areas are privately owned including the roads. Since the island can be accessed by boat or small plane only, a regular passenger ferry service runs from Pine Island Marina at two-hour intervals, serving both tourists and locals. There is also a barging service that transports materials to and garbage from the island.

== Hurricanes ==
The island was damaged in August 2004 when the eastern eyewall of Hurricane Charley struck North Captiva, immediately before hitting Charlotte Harbor to the north-northeast. The southern part of the island was divided from the north. Although it took several years, the island has mostly recovered from the hurricane damage and new construction is ongoing.

Hurricane Ian made landfall on North Captiva Island on September 28, 2022, with wind speeds of 150 mph. The center of the eye of Hurricane Ian passed over the Safety Harbor Club Lake.
