= Captiva, Florida =

- Census-designated place
- Location in Lee County and the state of Florida
- Coordinates: 26°30′40″N 82°11′22″W
- Country: United States
- State: Florida
- County: Lee

Area
  - Total: 1.64 sq mi (4.26 km^{2})
  - Land: 1.18 sq mi (3.06 km^{2})
  - Water: 0.46 sq mi (1.20 km^{2})
- Elevation: 7 ft (2.1 m)

Population (2020)
  - Total: 318
  - Density: 269.2/sq mi (103.93/km^{2})
- Time zone: UTC-5 (Eastern (EST))
  - Summer (DST): UTC-4 (EDT)
- ZIP code: 33924
- Area code: 239
- FIPS code: 12-10425
- GNIS feature ID: 2402748
- Website: sanibel-captiva.org

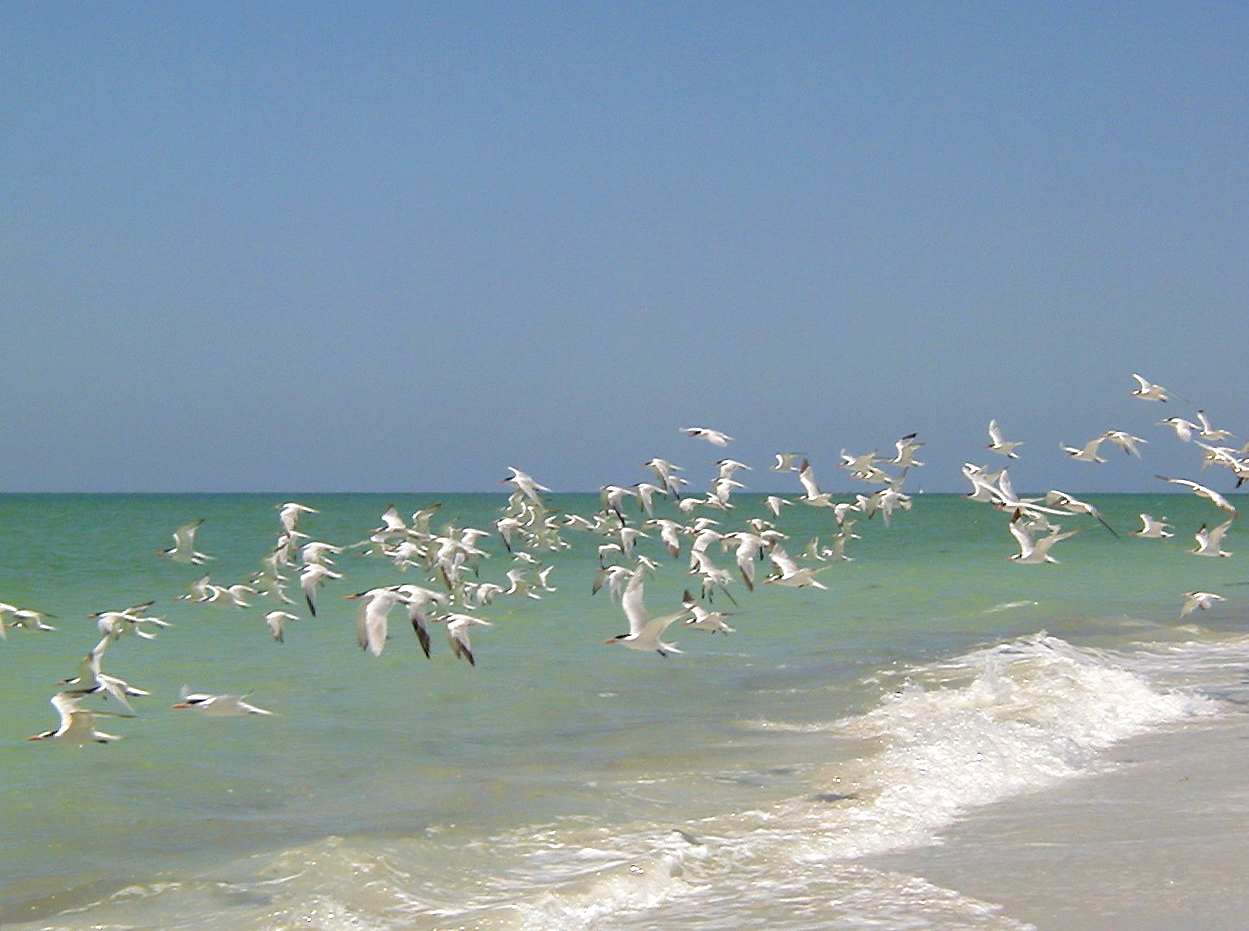
A flock of Royal Terns in flight above the western beach of Upper Captiva Island

Captiva is an unincorporated community and census-designated place (CDP) in Lee County, Florida, United States. It is on Captiva Island. As of the 2020 census, the population was 318, down from 583 at the 2010 census. It is part of the Cape Coral-Fort Myers, Florida Metropolitan Statistical Area.

Just offshore in the Gulf of Mexico, the island is north of Sanibel Island. Captiva is accessed by a small bridge that crosses Blind Pass from Sanibel Island.

Many of Captiva's homes, condominiums, and businesses were destroyed during Hurricane Charley in 2004, but the island recovered shortly thereafter. In September 2022, Hurricane Ian caused significant damage to the causeway and to the island's infrastructure.

== Geography ==
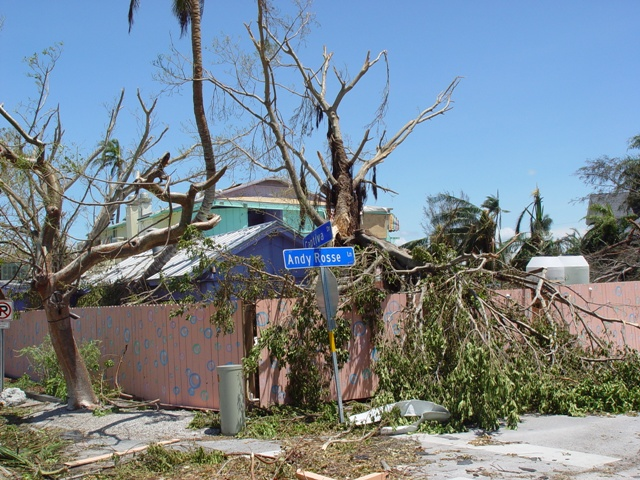
Damage on Captiva Island from Hurricane Charley

Captiva is in western Lee County. The CDP comprises the entire island, bordered to the west by the Gulf of Mexico and to the east by Pine Island Sound. Captiva Drive is the island's main road, running from the town center to the Blind Pass bridge to Sanibel. It is a 13-mile (21 km) drive from Captiva to the Sanibel Causeway and 31 miles (50 km) by road from Captiva to the center of Fort Myers.

According to the United States Census Bureau, the Captiva CDP has an area of 1.7 square miles (4.3 km^{2}), of which 1.2 square miles (3.1 km^{2}) is land and 0.46 square miles (1.2 km^{2}), or 28.15%, is water.

Originally part of neighboring Sanibel Island to the southeast, it was severed in 1926 when a hurricane's storm surge created a new channel, Blind Pass. The channel gradually filled in, but was reopened by dredging in 2009. Like Sanibel, Captiva is a barrier island to Pine Island (to the east of Captiva and north of Sanibel), but it is much narrower. The only automobile access to Captiva is via the Sanibel Causeway and Sanibel-Captiva Road, which ends in the CDP of Captiva, the island's only CDP. Captiva was homesteaded in 1888 and a tiny cemetery next to The Chapel by the Sea has the grave of the original resident, William Herbert Binder (1850–1932), an Austrian. Half the island is in private ownership. "Millionaire's Row" comprises luxury homes on the gulf and bay sides of Captiva Drive. The South Seas Island Resort entry gate is at the end of this road. Roosevelt Channel, on the island's east side, is named for Theodore Roosevelt, who fished there.

North Captiva Island or Upper Captiva is an island that was severed from Captiva in a 1921 hurricane, creating Redfish Pass. North Captiva has power from lines that originate on the north end of Captiva, and is privately owned. It can be accessed only by boat or plane.

In August 2004, Captiva was seriously damaged when the eastern eyewall of Hurricane Charley struck North Captiva, immediately before hitting Charlotte Harbor to the north-northeast. Initial reports were that 160 buildings had been destroyed and another 160 seriously damaged. The storm surge cut a path 491 yards (449 m) wide across the narrowest part of North Captiva, separating the island. The separation of the two halves of the island began during a series of tornadoes caused by Tropical Storm Gabrielle that passed through the area in September 2001. The new pass filled in within a few years and is now back to its pre-Charley state. Most of the island's invasive Australian pines blew over in the hurricane, making room for native mangroves and sabal palms.

In September 2022, Category 4 Hurricane Ian made landfall in Upper Captiva with sustained winds of 150 mph. The Sanibel Causeway was heavily damaged by the hurricane.

== Demographics ==
Historical population
Census	Pop.	Note	%±
2000	379		—
2010	583		53.8%
2020	318		−45.5%
U.S. Decennial Census

As of the census of 2000, there were 379 people, 194 households, and 130 families residing in the CDP. The population density was 305.3 inhabitants per square mile (117.9/km^{2}). There were 1,150 housing units at an average density of 926.2 per square mile (357.6/km^{2}). The racial makeup of the CDP was 98.42% White, 0.79% Asian, 0.26% from other races, and 0.53% from two or more races. Hispanic or Latino of any race were 0.79% of the population.

There were 194 households, out of which 10.3% had children under the age of 18 living with them, 63.9% were married couples living together, 1.5% had a female householder with no husband present, and 32.5% were non-families. 25.3% of all households were made up of individuals, and 11.9% had someone living alone who was 65 years of age or older. The average household size was 1.95 and the average family size was 2.25.

In the CDP, the population was spread out, with 8.2% under the age of 18, 1.1% from 18 to 24, 14.2% from 25 to 44, 44.1% from 45 to 64, and 32.5% who were 65 years of age or older. The median age was 58 years. For every 100 females, there were 96.4 males. For every 100 females age 18 and over, there were 96.6 males.

The median income for a household in the CDP was $64,821, and the median income for a family was $120,488. Males had a median income of $31,875 versus $44,861 for females. The per capita income was $76,139. None of the population or families were below the poverty line.

== Economy ==
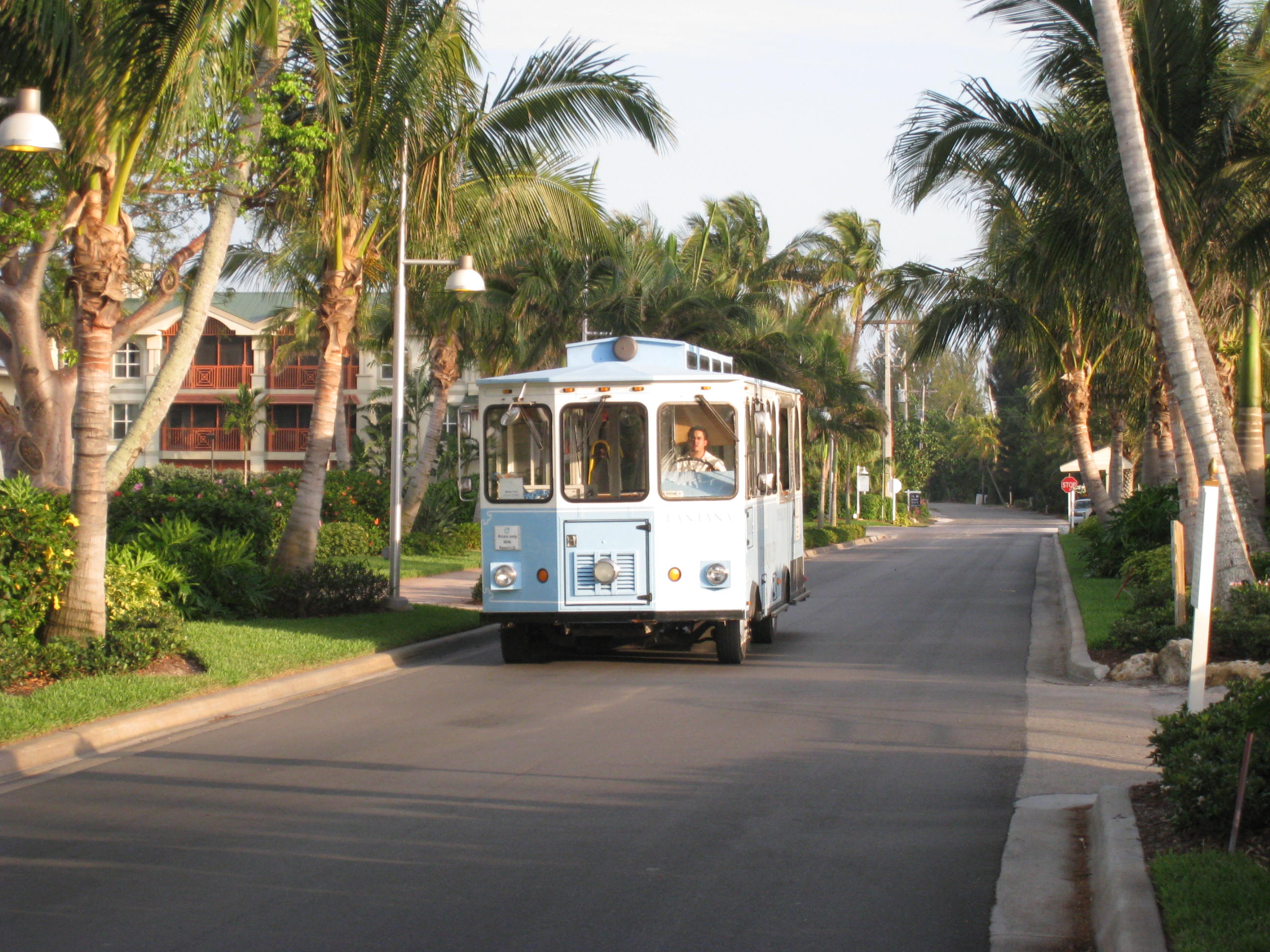
Plantation Rd. inside South Seas Island Resort in Captiva

Travel, tourism, and hospitality are the number one industry on Captiva Island (and its sister island, Sanibel). Noted Captiva guests include Theodore Roosevelt, Charles Lindbergh (who regularly landed his plane on the beach in front of 'Tween Waters Inn), Anne Morrow Lindbergh, and Ding Darling. Both the Old Captiva House restaurant and a number of guest cottages have been designated historically significant sites by Lee County.

The Bubble Room was built on Captiva Island in 1979 by the Farquharson family. It is a multi-themed restaurant featuring toys from the 1930s and '40s. The Bubble Room plays music from the 1920s, '30s, and '40s. It was one of Captiva Island's first establishments to use the bright pastel colors now widely found there.

South Seas Island Resort and Yacht Harbor, a 330-acre (1.3 km^{2}) resort, occupies the northern two miles (3 km) of Captiva Island.

Pepperidge Farm created a cookie in honor of the island, a dark chocolate brownie cookie called Captiva.

The Wall Street Journal selected Sanibel and Captiva Islands as one of the 10 Best Places for Second Homes in 2010.

== History ==
According to local folklore, Captiva got its name because the pirate captain José Gaspar (Gasparilla) held his female prisoners on the island for ransom. But Gaspar's existence is sourced to an early 20th-century developer's advertising brochure and may be a fabrication.

Around 3000 B.C., the sands of Captiva started to erode, resulting in the eventual formation of Sanibel Island. The Gulf of Mexico waters were eight feet lower than they are today. It is said that Captiva's first inhabitants were the Calusa Indians. The population of the Calusa is believed to have reached as many as 50,000 people. "Calusa" means "fierce people", and they were described as warlike. The Calusa were resistant to colonization and attacked explorers who came into their territory. They built their houses on stilts without walls. They wove palmetto leaves together to build roves (twisted strands of fibers), and fished for food on the coast, bays, rivers, and waterways. They did not farm. "The Calusa Indians did not farm like the other Indian tribes in Florida. Instead, they fished for food on the coast, bays, rivers, and waterways. The men and boys of the tribe made nets from palm tree webbing to catch mullet, pinfish, pigfish, and catfish. They used spears to catch eels and turtles. They made fish bone arrowheads to hunt for animals such as deer. The women and children learned to catch shellfish like conchs, crabs, clams, lobsters, and oysters." The Calusa used shells for utensils, jewelry, tools, weapons, and ornaments.

By the late 1700s most of the Calusa Indians had died out. Many were captured and sold as slaves while others died from diseases such as smallpox and measles.

William Herbert Binder, an Austrian, was on a German freighter headed to New Orleans when the ship ran aground off Boca Grande. He washed up to shore on Upper Captiva. "He lived for several weeks on what the unoccupied island had to offer, built a makeshift raft, and got himself to Pine Island, where he was helped to return to his home. By 1888, due to his having fought with the U.S. Army, he became naturalized, and was allowed to homestead on Captiva in 1888, when he was 38 years old. For 10 years he was Captiva's first and only modern-era inhabitant. He died in 1932."

== Notable residents ==
- Roy Lichtenstein, pop artist, had a home on Captiva.
- Robert Rauschenberg, artist, had a home on Captiva.
