= Fort Myers Subdivision (Seaboard Air Line Railroad) =

Former railroad in Southwest Florida

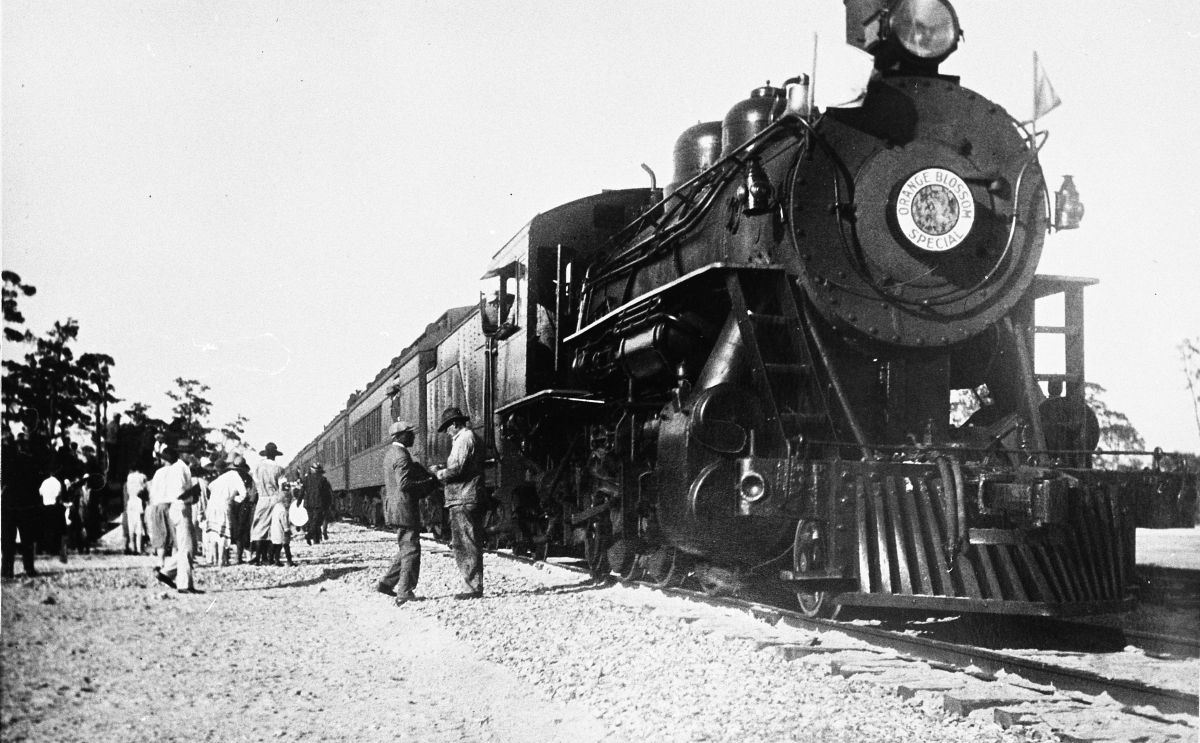
- Orange Blossom Special in Naples

Overview
- Status: Abandoned
- Owner: Seaboard Air Line Railroad
- Termini: Hull, Florida; Naples, Florida

History
- Opened: 1926
- Closed: 1952

Technical
- Line length: 68 mi (109 km)
- Track gauge: 1,435 mm (4 ft 8 1/2 in) standard gauge
- Electrification: No
- Signalling: None

The Seaboard Air Line Railroad's Fort Myers Subdivision was a railroad line in Southwest Florida running from Hull (near Fort Ogden) south to Fort Myers and Naples. It also included two branch lines that ran from Fort Myers: one east to LaBelle, and one southwest to Punta Rassa. It began service in 1926 during the Florida land boom of the 1920s as part of an effort to expand the Seaboard Air Line's network further south in Florida. The line declined in the 1940s and was completely abandoned by 1952.

== Route description ==
The Fort Myers Subdivision began at Hull on the Peace River in DeSoto County, where it branched off the company's Boca Grande Subdivision (the former Charlotte Harbor and Northern Railway). From Hull, it ran directly south in a nearly straight trajectory to Fort Myers. It crossed the rival Atlantic Coast Line Railroad's Lakeland—Fort Myers Line twice en route to Fort Myers: once in Fort Ogden and once at Gilchrist (just northeast of North Fort Myers). The line connected with a logging railroad operated by the Dowling and Camp Lumber Company near Slater. As the line approached Fort Myers, it crossed the wide Caloosahatchee River on a swing bridge just west of the original Tamiami Trail Bridge.

In Fort Myers, a passenger depot was located just south of the river at the intersection of present-day Palm Beach Boulevard and East Riverside Drive. A separate freight depot with a 14-track switching yard was located half a mile south of the passenger depot on Michigan Avenue near Billy's Creek. From the freight depot, the line continued south out of the city along Palm Avenue, crossing the Atlantic Coast Line Railroad two more times before leaving the city. South of Fort Myers, the line ran on the west side of the Ten Mile Canal, closely paralleling the Atlantic Coast Line Railroad (which was located on the other side of the canal).

Just north of Mullock Creek, the line turned southeast and ran on the west side of the Tamiami Trail. After crossing the Estero River, it passed to the west of Koreshan Unity Settlement in Estero. Just north of Bonita Springs, the line turned south again and crossed the Imperial River on a lift bridge. The Bonita Springs passenger depot existed on the south side of Bonita Beach Road at the current site of the parking lot of the First Presbyterian Church. The line continued south and joined the current route of Goodlette-Frank Road near Vanderbilt Beach and headed to its terminus in Downtown Naples. The Naples terminus included a passenger depot on Fifth Avenue South, yard tracks, and a turning wye.

=== Branches ===
In addition to the main route, two significant branches existed from Fort Myers to LaBelle and to Punta Rassa.

The LaBelle Subdivision ran from Fort Myers east 30 miles to LaBelle on the Caloosahatchee River. The LaBelle Subdivision began just south of the Fort Myers freight depot and ran east between Michigan Avenue and Anderson Avenue (present-day MLK /State Road 82) on what is now a powerline corridor that runs along B street before turning northeast and crossing the Orange River on a lift bridge. Once across the Orange River, it continued just south of and parallel to present-day State Road 80 on what is presently a power line corridor. It terminated in downtown LaBelle at a depot at Main Street and Seminole Avenue. In the 1940s, a seven-mile spur was built from the LaBelle branch southeast to the flexible gunnery training center at Buckingham Army Air Field.

9 miles south of Fort Myers, the Punta Rassa Subdivision branched off the line at Punta Rassa Junction (located at present-day Six Mile Cypress Parkway's crossing of the Ten Mile Canal). The branch ran from Punta Rassa Junction west along the current route of Six Mile Cypress Parkway, through the center of today's Lakes Park (south of and parallel to the park's scenic boardwalk), then southwest along the current routes of Summerlin Road and Pine Ridge Road before turning back north slightly to its terminus at McGregor Boulevard in Truckland, just two miles away from Punta Rassa.

== History ==
=== Planning and construction ===
In the early 1920s, S. Davies Warfield, the president of the Seaboard Air Line Railroad, sought to expand the railroad's network further south on both the east and west coasts of Florida. In June of 1925, the company created a subsidiary, the Seaboard–All Florida Railway, to oversee extensions of the network to Fort Myers and Naples as well as a separate extension on the east coast to Miami. In January 1926, the Seaboard Air Line acquired the Charlotte Harbor and Northern Railway, which became the company's Boca Grande Subdivision. Construction quickly began on the expansion to Fort Myers a month later which would branch off the Boca Grande Subdivision at Hull, just northeast of Fort Odgen. Groundbreaking for the line took place in Fort Myers on February 8, 1926. The Seaboard–All Florida Railway oversaw construction of the route from Hull through Fort Myers to the Estero River as well as both branch lines. For the remaining route from the Estero River south to Naples, the railroad created a separate subsidiary, the Naples, Seaboard and Gulf Railway to oversee its construction. The construction contract for most of the line was awarded to Foley Brothers, who was one of the largest railroad contractors in the country at the time. Another contractor, John S. Jones, built the line through Bonita Springs and Naples. Both the Naples and Fort Myers passenger depots were designed by Harvey and Clarke, an architecture firm based in West Palm Beach that designed many stations for the Seaboard Air Line. Warfield had hoped deep water marine terminals would be developed in both Naples and Punta Rassa, though neither of which were ever built.

The first freight train to Fort Myers ran the line on November 10, 1926, and track to Naples was fully completed in December 1926. Upon its completion, the Seaboard Air Line designated the line on employee timetables as the Fort Myers Subdivision and the branches were designated as the LaBelle Subdivision and Punta Rassa Subdivision. For a few years, Seaboard track north of Hull via Edison Junction to the Main Line at Plant City was also designated as part the Fort Myers Subdivision. Though track north of Hull to Edison Junction was later redesignated as part of the Boca Grande Subdivision.

=== Grand opening celebration ===
The Fort Myers Subdivision officially commenced operation with the start of passenger service on January 7, 1927. On opening day, President S. Davies Warfield rode aboard a special section of the Seaboard's Orange Blossom Special with a number of special guests and dignitaries including Florida Governor John W. Martin. The train stopped at points along the line for public ovation with thousands of people attending. The following day, the same train would inaugurate service on the Miami extension in the same manner. The two-day celebration of the opening of both extensions is considered to be one of the largest public relations events in the history of American railroads.

=== Early years ===
After opening, the Seaboard's Orange Blossom Special and West Coast Limited provided daily passenger service down the west coast. Mixed train service (both passenger cars and freight combined) was offered from Fort Myers to LaBelle. The Seaboard's first train to LaBelle ran in March 1927. The Punta Rassa Subdivision ended up mostly serving agricultural land and gladiolus fields near Biggar.

Henry Ford, the founder of the Ford Motor Company, was noted to have travelled to his winter home in Fort Myers on Seaboard Air Line trains. Ford could arrive discreetly to his winter home (the Edison and Ford Winter Estates) on McGregor Boulevard due to the station's proximity.

=== Decline and abandonment ===
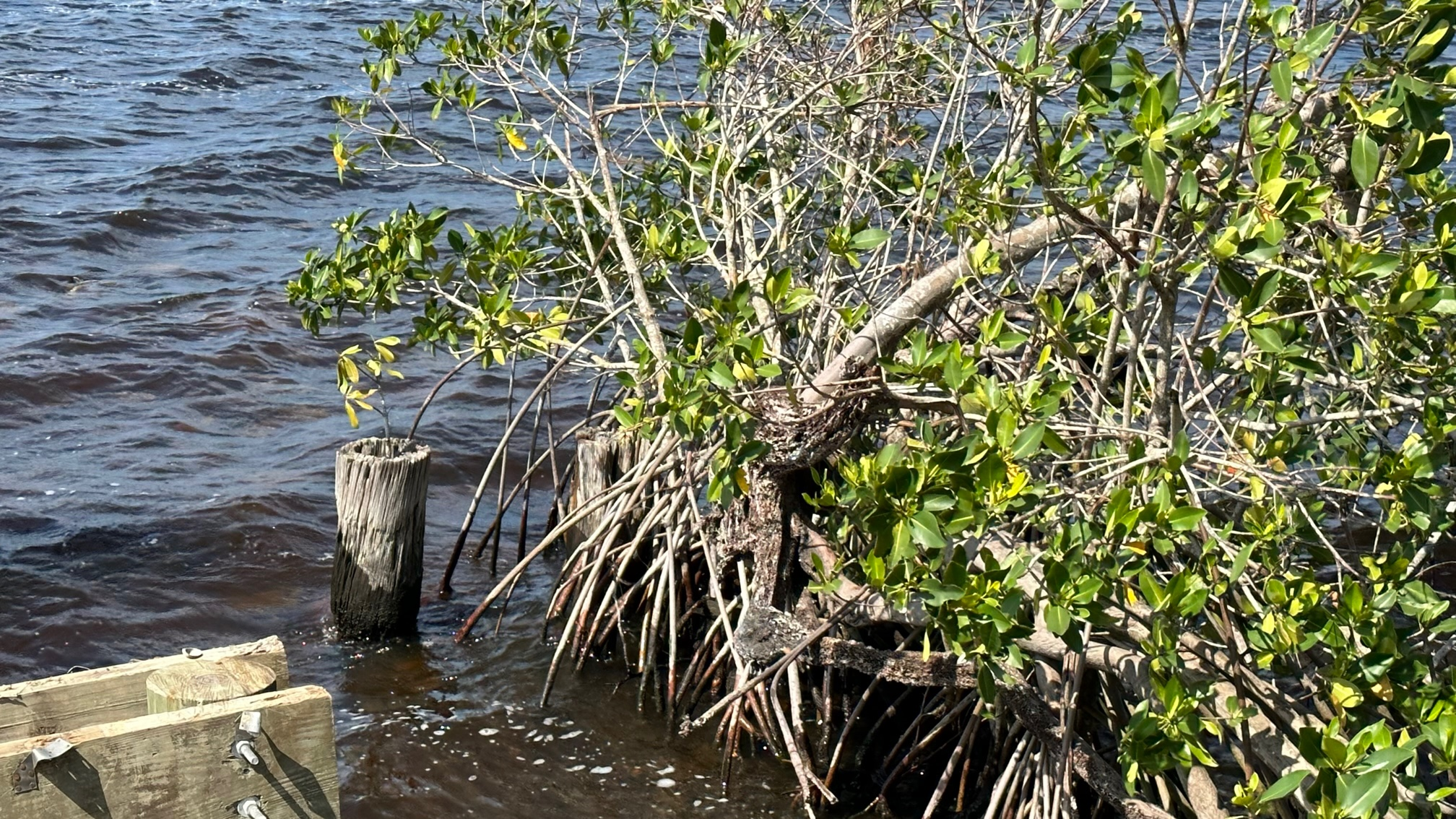
Remaining wooden pilings for the Seaboard Air Line's bridge over the Caloosahatchee River in Fort Myers, Florida

The Seaboard Air Line went bankrupt in 1930 after the collapse of the land boom and in 1931, service to Fort Myers and Naples was reduced to a mixed train that operated three days a week. In 1933, only six years after it opened, passenger service was discontinued entirely on the Fort Myers Subdivision.

By 1942, the Seaboard Air Line abandoned the Fort Myers Subdivision from Naples up to Punta Rassa Junction, which essentially made the Punta Rassa Subdivision the south end of the line. The LaBelle Subdivision was also abandoned east of Alva and the Punta Rassa Subdivision was abandoned west of the San Carlos freight depot. After the abandonment in Naples, the Naples depot on Fifth Avenue and the southernmost seven miles of the right of way from there up to Vanderbilt were sold to the rival Atlantic Coast Line Railroad, whose line ran just to the east of Naples. The Atlantic Coast Line would subsequently abandon their branch to Marco Island south of Vanderbilt and extend the remaining line down the former Seaboard right of way to the Fifth Avenue depot. The Atlantic Coast Line restored passenger service to the Fifth Avenue depot which would continue serving passenger trains until 1971. Freight service would continue on this segment until 1979 with tracks being removed a year later. What remained of the Fort Myers Subdivision was abandoned and removed by 1952.

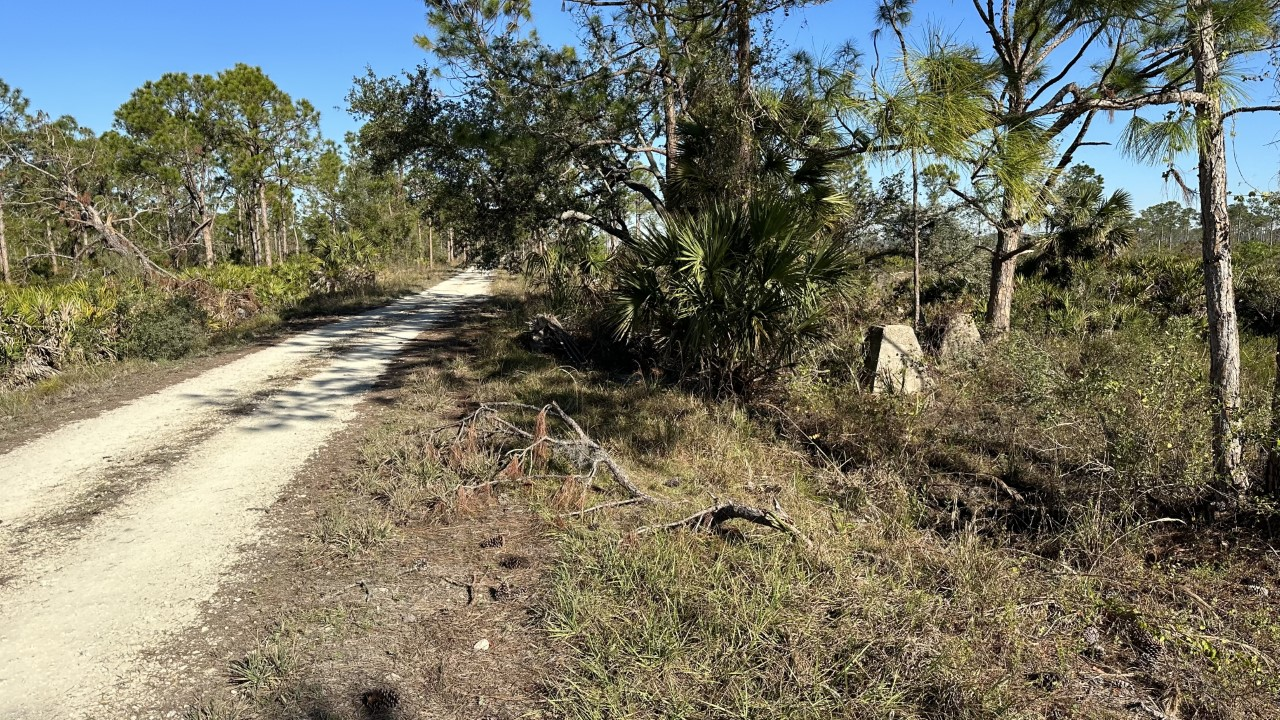
Former right of way of the West Coast route within the Fred C. Babcock/Cecil M. Webb Wildlife Management Area in southern Charlotte County. It is now a dirt trail named "Seaboard Grade". The concrete footings to the right are remnants of a water tower for steam locomotives.

In 1958, the Atlantic Coast Line built a spur from their main line along the first two miles of the former Punta Rassa Subdivision right of way to serve a rock mine operated by West Coast Rock Co. The rock mine was located on Gladiolus Drive just east of the Tamiami Trail (US 41). The mine and spur operated until the mid 1960s and site became the site of Lakes Park in the 1980s.

The Seaboard Air Line would later merge with the Atlantic Coast Line Railroad in 1967 which created the Seaboard Coast Line Railroad. The Seaboard Coast Line would subsequently reuse the Fort Myers Subdivision name on the parallel ex-Atlantic Coast Line Lakeland—Fort Myers Line as the company adopted the Seaboard Air Line's method of naming their lines as subdivisions. What remained of that line was sold to Seminole Gulf Railway in 1987.

=== Remnants ===
Despite its abandonment, remnants of the Seaboard Air Line's Fort Myers Subdivision and the branches remain.

Some of the former right of way in Charlotte County is now an unpaved trail within the Fred C. Babcock/Cecil M. Webb Wildlife Management Area called "Seaboard Grade". The foundation of one of the railroad's water towers still stands along Seaboard Grade just north of Tucker's Grade.

In North Fort Myers the remnants of the right of way can still be seen at Prairie Pines Preserve and the point where the line used to cross the Caloosahatchee is now Old Bridge Park.

In Fort Myers, the pier at Riverside Park is located where the bridge crossed the river. Just south of the river, Seaboard Street and Palm Avenue run along the line's former right of way. Just south of Fort Myers, portions of the 6 mile long John Yarbrough Linear Park that run on the west side of the Ten Mile Canal run very close to the line's former right of way. An FPL transmission line runs on most of the former route from Mullock Creek to Vanderbilt Beach (right of way very visible at Estero Bay Preserve State Park East), and Goodlette-Frank Road still run the rest of the right of way from there to downtown Naples. FPL transmission lines also run along much of the former LaBelle and Punta Rassa Subdivisions as well.

The Naples passenger depot on Fifth Avenue South is still standing and it is now the Naples Depot Museum. The Fort Myers passenger depot most recently housed the Reilly Brothers Construction company but the building was demolished in August 2020. The Fort Myers freight depot and yard on Michigan Avenue most recently housed Gully's Discount Store Fixtures but it was demolished in early 2023. An apartment complex named "Seaboard Waterside Apartments" is planned to be built on the site of the former freight yard.

Along the former Punta Rassa Subdivision, the former San Carlos freight building (on Pine Ridge Road east of San Carlos Boulevard) is now an antique shop. The Biggar freight depot, which was located on the southeast corner of Summerlin Road and Gladiolus Drive in later years, operated as a produce stand named Nancy's Produce until 2006. It was subsequently demolished to make room for the construction of overpasses at that intersection.

The Railroad Museum of Southwest Florida, which is located within Lakes Park, sits very close to the former Punta Rassa Subdivision right of way with a historic plaque marking its location.

== Historic Stations ==
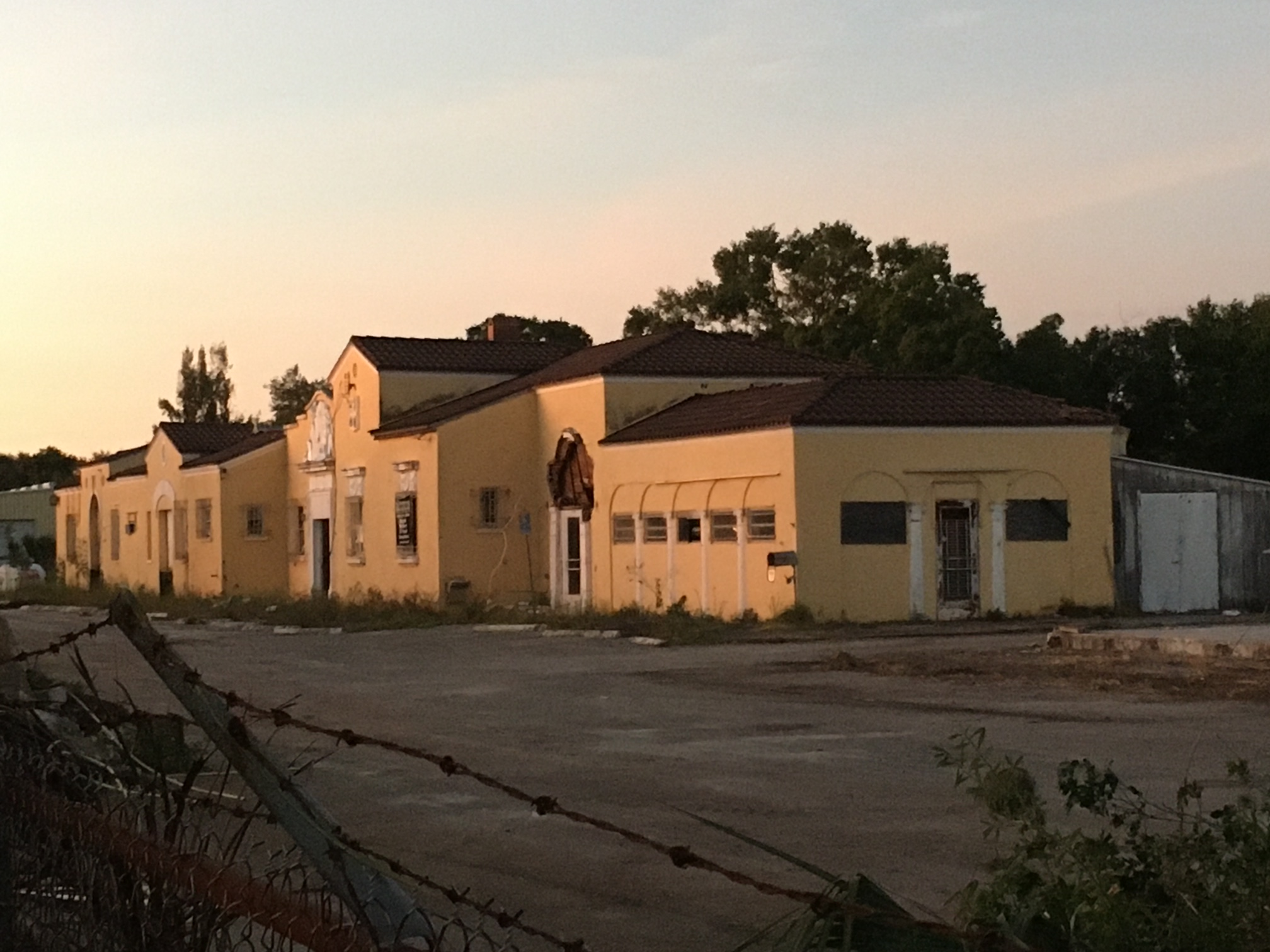
Former SAL passenger depot in Fort Myers as seen before its demolition in 2020

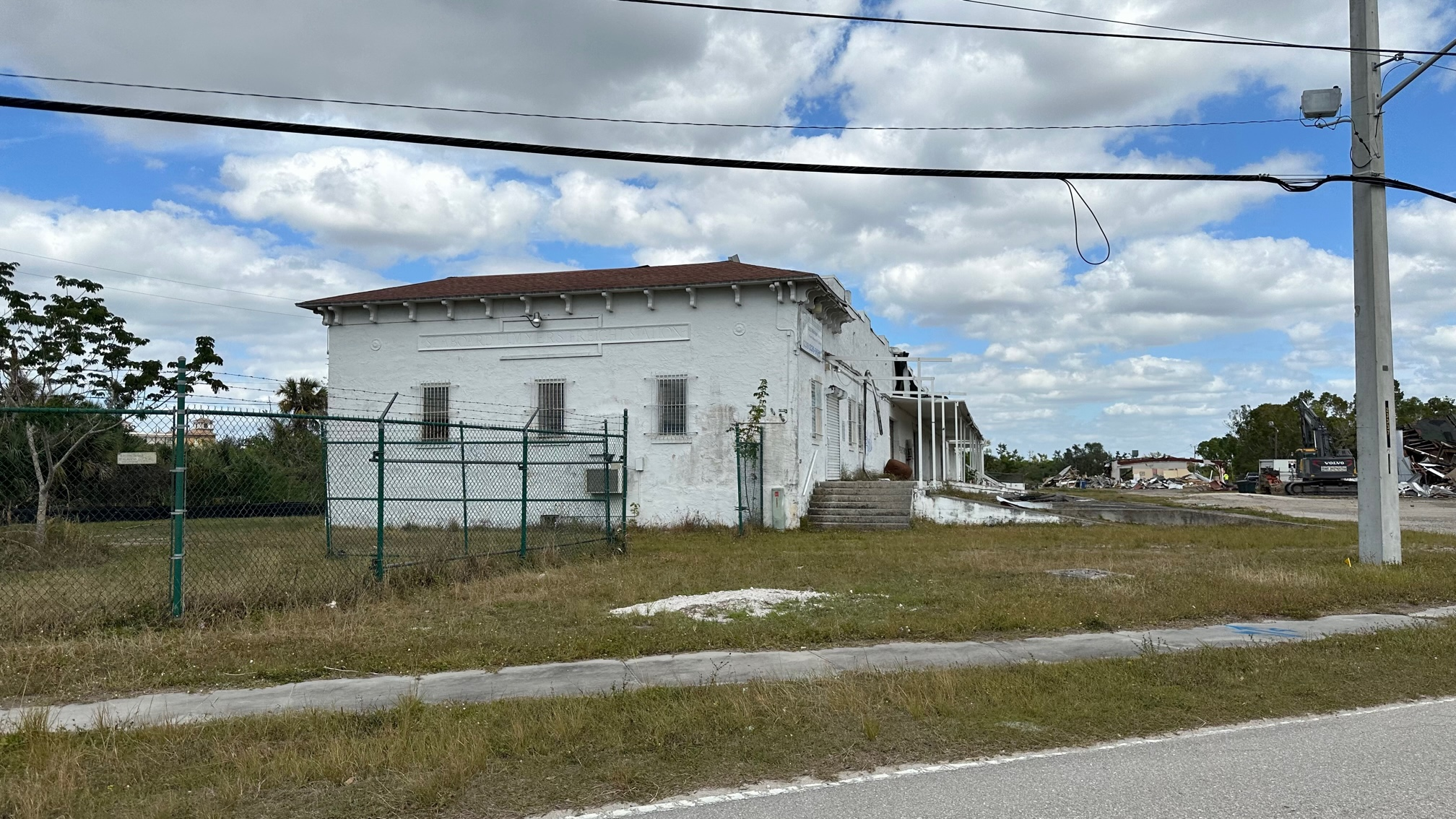
Former SAL freight depot in Fort Myers as seen before its demolition in 2023

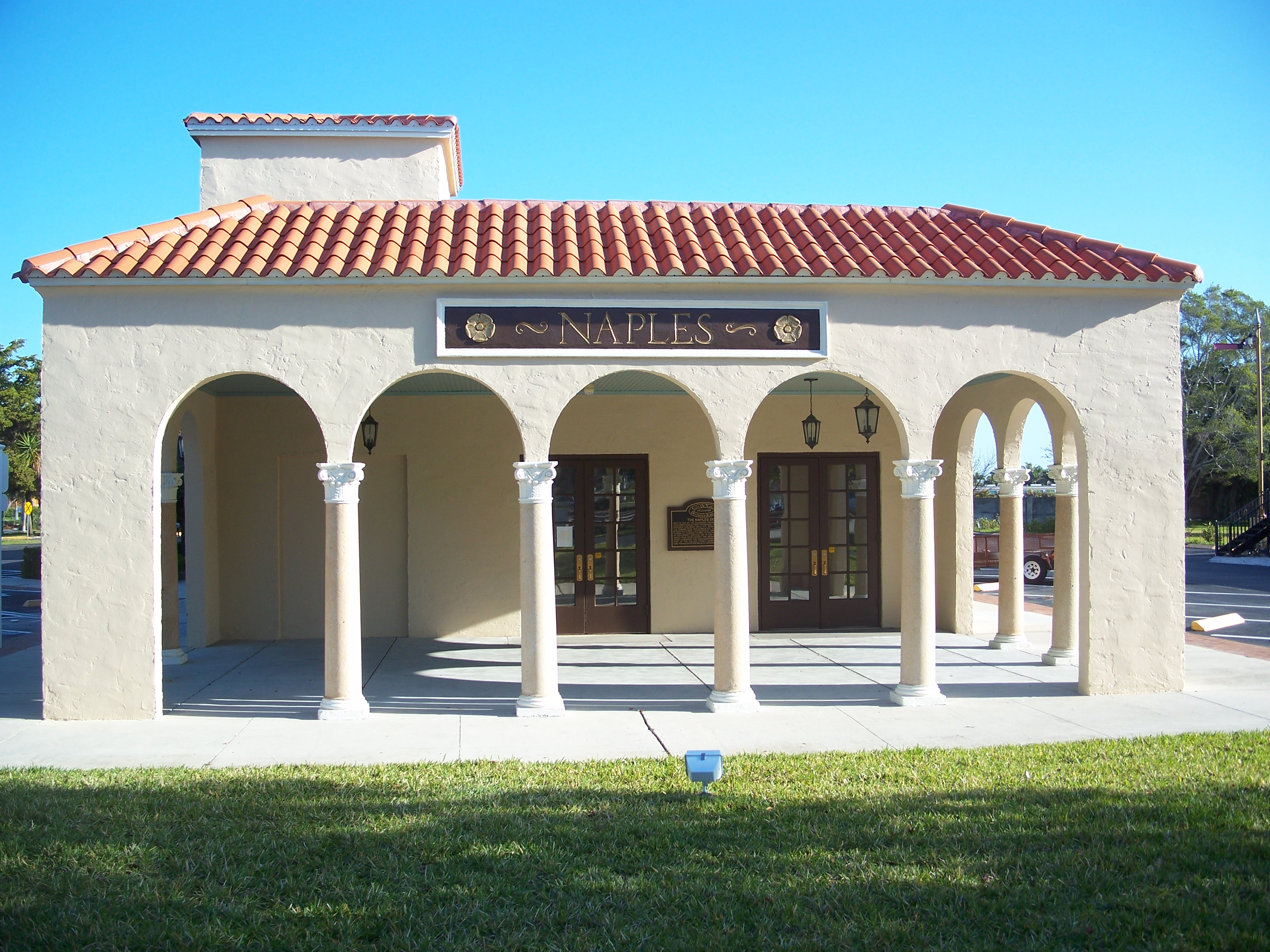
Former Naples depot, which is nearly identical to the Hialeah depot

Hull to Naples
Milepost	City/Location	Station	Connections and notes
VC 893.4	Hull	Hull	junction with Seaboard Air Line Railroad Boca Grande Subdivision
VC 894.7	Fort Ogden	Fort Ogden	junction with Atlantic Coast Line Railroad Lakeland—Fort Myers Line
VC 902.6		Shell City	
VC 904.8		Saline	
VC 911.0		Tuckers	
VC 916.7		Gilchrist	junction with Atlantic Coast Line Railroad Lakeland—Fort Myers Line
VC 919.7		Tamiami	
VC 923.2	North Fort Myers	Salvista	
VC 925.6	Fort Myers	Fort Myers	Freight depot located half-mile south of passenger depot junction with: LaBelle Subdivision; Atlantic Coast Line Railroad Lakeland—Fort Myers Line
VC 934.3		Punta Rassa Junction	junction with Punta Rassa Subdivision
VC 940.7	Estero	Estero	
VC 942.6		Hendry	
VC 943.8		Gibson	
VC 948.8	Bonita Springs	Bonita Springs	
VC 953.7	Vanderbilt Beach	Vanderbilt	
VC 961.7	Naples	Naples	

LaBelle Subdivision
Milepost	City/Location	Station	Connections and notes
VO 925.6	Fort Myers	Fort Myers	junction with Fort Myers Subdivision
VO 936.2	Buckingham	Buckingham	
VO 943.3	Alva	Alva	
VO 945.5		Floweree	
VO 948.1	Fort Denaud	Fort Denaud	
VO 955.1	LaBelle	LaBelle	

Punta Rassa Subdivision
Milepost	City/Location	Station	Connections and notes
VN 934.3		Punta Rassa Junction	junction with Fort Myers Subdivision
VN 936.7		Biggar	
VN 940.8		San Carlos	building is now an antique shop
VN 942.7		Truckland	
