= Charlotte Harbor (estuary) =

Large bay on the southwest coast of Florida

Coordinates: 26°46′33″N 82°08′31″W

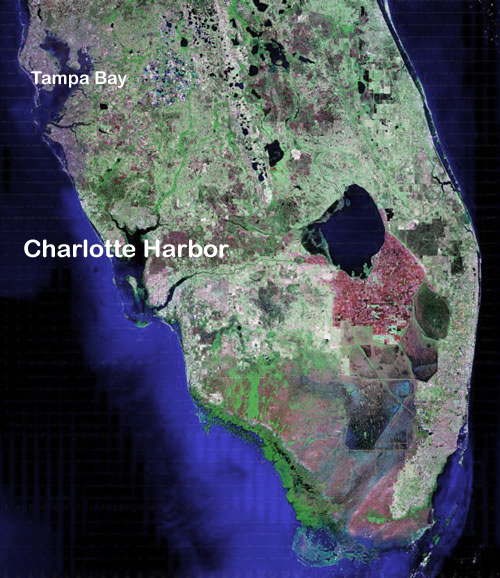
Charlotte Harbor and SW Florida in a NASA satellite image

Charlotte Harbor Estuary, the second largest bay in Florida, is located on the Gulf of Mexico coast of west Florida with half lying in Charlotte County, Florida, a fourth in Sarasota County, and a fourth in Lee County. The harbor's mouth is located behind Gasparilla Island, one of the many coastal barrier islands on the southwest coast of Florida, with access from the Gulf of Mexico through the Boca Grande Pass between Gasparilla Island on the north and Lacosta Island on the south. Charlotte Harbor covers about 270 sq mi (700 km^{2}).

Charlotte Harbor Estuary is a natural estuary spanning the west coast of Florida from Venice to Bonita Springs on the Gulf of Mexico and is one of the most productive wetlands in Florida. The estuary has a large watershed, and includes Charlotte Harbor itself as well as the Peace River, Caloosahatchee River (via Pine Island Sound) and Myakka River basins. It covers 12,653 square kilometers (4,885 sq mi), the second largest open water estuary in the state.

It is classified as a bar-built estuary, formed when sandbars build up along the coastline. The sand bars block the waters behind them from the sea. Such estuaries tend to be shallow with minimal tidal action.

This is a threatened ecosystem because of the rapid increase of growth and development, poor land-use policies, and the overuse of natural resources. The Charlotte Harbor Aquatic Preserves, established by the state of Florida in 1975, are five contiguous aquatic preserves within the greater Charlotte Harbor estuary. It includes salt marshes, mangroves, seagrass, oyster and tidal flats. It is the preserve of many species, including the American alligator, West Indian manatee, bald eagle, wood stork, piping plover, green and loggerhead sea turtles, smalltooth sawfish (Pristis pectinata), royal false pawpaw (Deeringothamnus pulchellus), Florida perforate cladonia (Cladonia perforata), and many more.

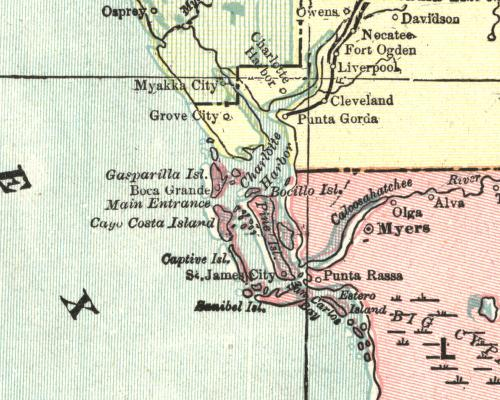
Portion of a 1901 map of Charlotte Harbor by George F. Cram

The harbor is fed with fresh water from the Myakka River on its northwest corner and the Peace River on its northeastern corner. Charlotte Harbor is bordered by the communities of Boca Grande, Port Charlotte, Charlotte Harbor, Punta Gorda and Bokeelia. Charlotte Harbor connects to San Carlos Bay to the south by way of Pine Island Sound and Matlacha Pass.

== Etymology ==
The name of Charlotte Harbor is a corruption of the name Calusa into the Spanish name Carlos. At the time of Spanish contact in the 1560s, the leader of the Calusa was known as Carlos. The bay was first known as Bahia Carlos, or Carlos Bay, by the Spaniards. The British changed it from Carlos to Charlotte to honor King George III's wife, Charlotte of Mecklenburg-Strelitz.

== History ==
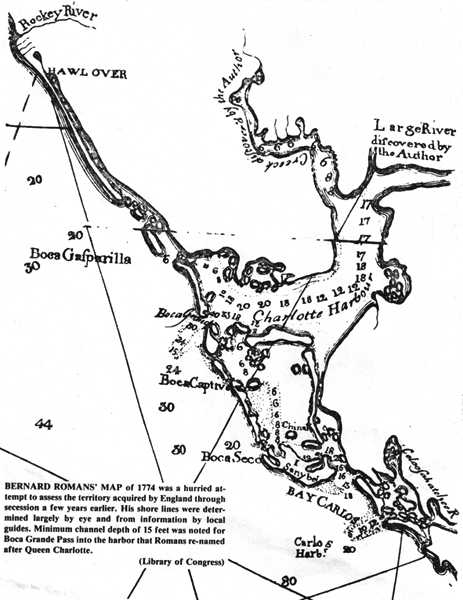
1774 Map of Charlotte Harbor by Bernard Roman

Prior to the first Europeans, Charlotte Harbor was home to settlements of Native Americans who were part of the Kingdom of Escampaba that governed southwest Florida, extending from Tampa Bay in the north to the Ten Thousand Islands in the south. The Calusa capital of Calos was located on Mound Key, just south of Charlotte Harbor.

=== Early European visits ===
Ponce de Leon was likely the first European who visited Charlotte Harbor in 1513 and again in 1521. He and his soldiers encountered hostile Calusa, and de Leon is believed to have died from a poisoned arrow wound received there. The site of the conflict is now Ponce de Leon Historical Park in eastern Punta Gorda. Charlotte Harbor might have been next visited by Juan de Anasco, Comptroller to the King of Spain, in 1538, one year before Hernando de Soto's exploration. In 1539, Hernando de Soto began his journey across the Southeast by landing on the west coast of the Florida peninsula, near the chiefdom of Uzita, where he encountered Juan Ortiz, a survivor of the Narváez expedition who had been captured by the Tocobaga at Tampa Bay. Traditional reconstructions locate Uzita at the mouth of the Manatee River in Tampa Bay, now the site of the De Soto National Memorial. However, other historians believe de Soto may have entered via Charlotte Harbor as he began his exploration of North America. Another suggested landing site for de Soto was directly below Charlotte Harbor up within the Caloosahatchee River. This is unlikely because Mound Key in Estero Bay south of the Caloosahatchee is generally agreed to have been the location of the Calusa capital, not the Uzita chiefdom.

As the Florida continued to be explored, some fisherman from Cuba and other Spanish settlements began to set up fishing camps, or "ranchos" along the Gulf Coast, including around Charlotte Harbor.

=== The pirates and shipwrecks of Charlotte Harbor ===
The mythical pirate José Gaspar (also known as "Gasparilla") was said to have roamed from the Gulf of Mexico to the Spanish Main from his secret base (sometimes referred to as his "pirate kingdom") in Charlotte Harbor from the late 1700s until his death in battle with the US Navy in 1821. Though no archival or physical evidence of Gaspar's existence has ever been found, he is a popular figure in Florida folklore, and the tale of the dashing pirate and his lost treasure has been used to promote tourism in Charlotte Harbor and along Florida's Gulf coast for many years, most notably in Tampa's Gasparilla Pirate Festival. The practice began in 1900, when the Charlotte Harbor and Northern Railway published the first written account of Jose Gaspar in a promotional brochure for its Boca Grande Hotel on Gasparilla Island.

Charlotte Harbor is also said to have been the refuge of the pirate Brewster Baker and the site of several shipwrecks of vessels containing untold millions of Spanish gold. However, despite many professional and amateur searches over the years, no treasure or evidence of a historical pirate stronghold has ever been found in the area.

=== Modern day ===
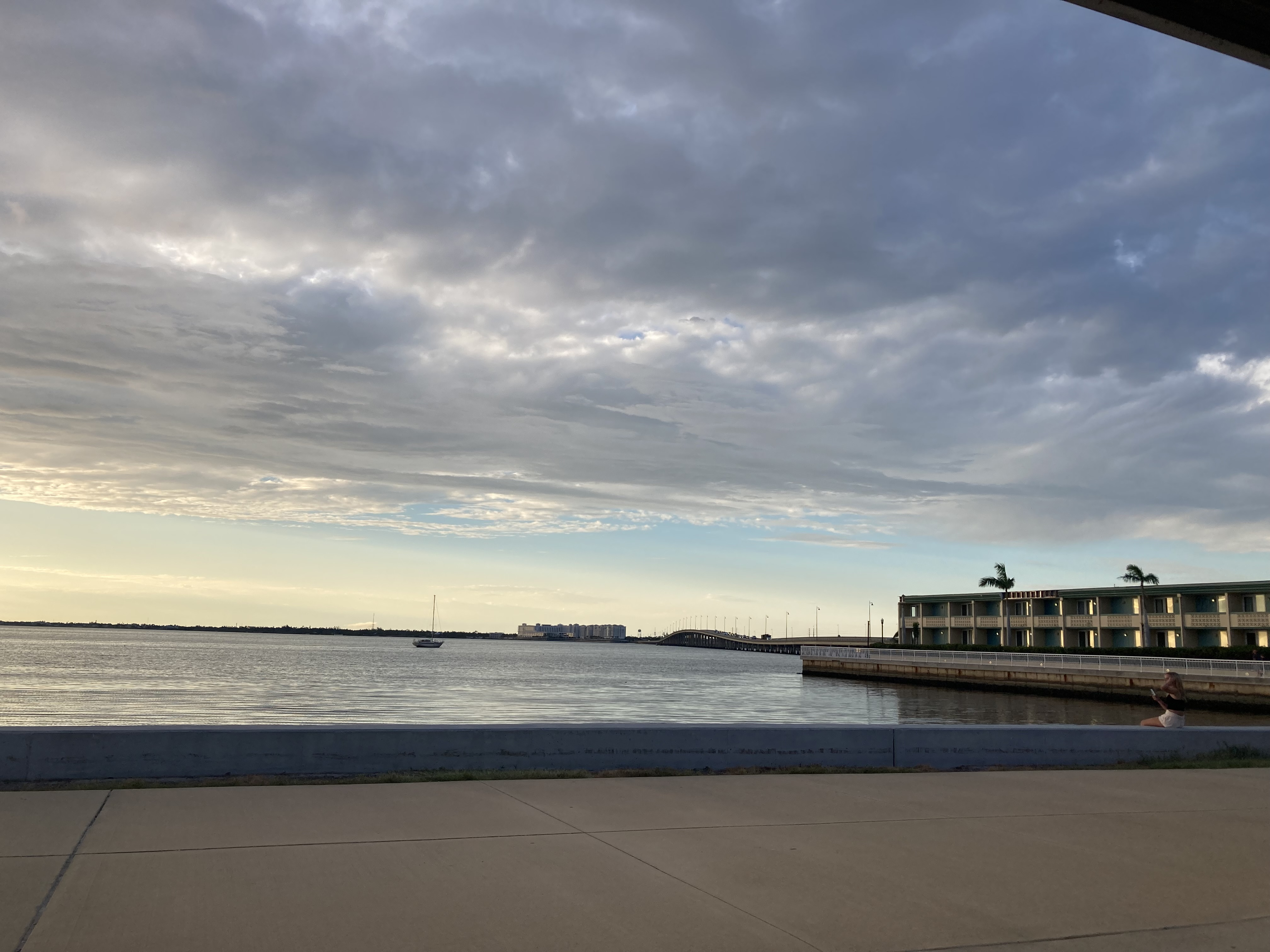
Charlotte Harbor as seen from Gilchrist Park in Punta Gorda

The Charlotte Harbor of the present day is a harbor mainly for privately owned pleasure craft and fishing boats. The area thrives partly due to tourism. There are also numerous retirement communities in the Charlotte Harbor area.

== Tropical cyclones ==
Charley making landfall on August 13, 2004

Charlotte Harbor has been hit by several tropical cyclones since records began to be kept in 1851. Listed below are the tropical cyclones whose paths have crossed Charlotte Harbor.

- 1894 Hurricane No. 4
- 1910 Hurricane No. 5
- 1925 Tropical Storm No. 4
- 1944 Hurricane No. 13
- 2004 Hurricane Charley
- 2022 Hurricane Ian

Hurricane Charley made landfall just south of Charlotte Harbor on Friday, August 13, 2004 at 3:54 PM EDT. Charley had reached a maximum sustained wind speed of 150 mph (240 km/h) By the time Charley reached Orlando, its winds had dropped to 95 mph (153 km/h), with gusts as high as 111 mph (179 km/h). Due to the rapid forward movement of Charley the amount of measured rainfall was between 4 and 6 inches (100 and 150 mm).

On September 28, 2022, Hurricane Ian made landfall just south of Punta Gorda at Pirate Harbor.

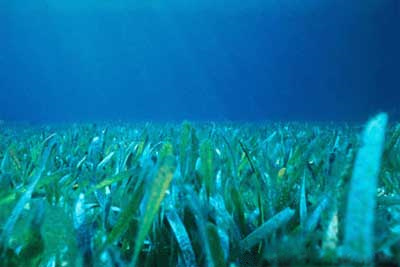
Florida seagrass

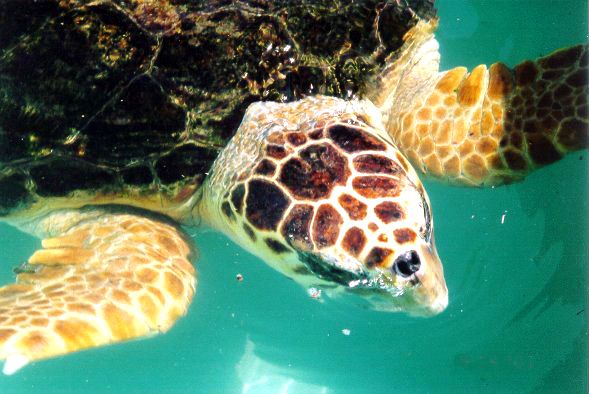
Loggerhead turtle (closeup)

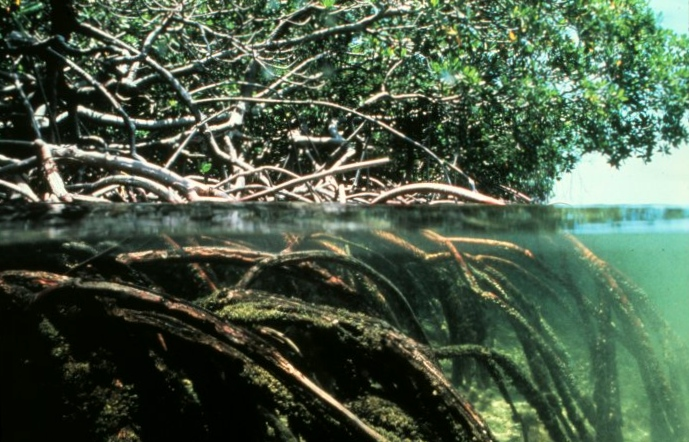
Coastal mangroves

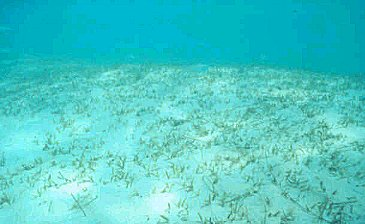
Florida seagrass bed

== See also ==
- Rookery Bay National Estuarine Research Reserve
- Charlotte Harbor Preserve State Park
