= Carlos (Calusa) =

Paramount chief of the Calusa people

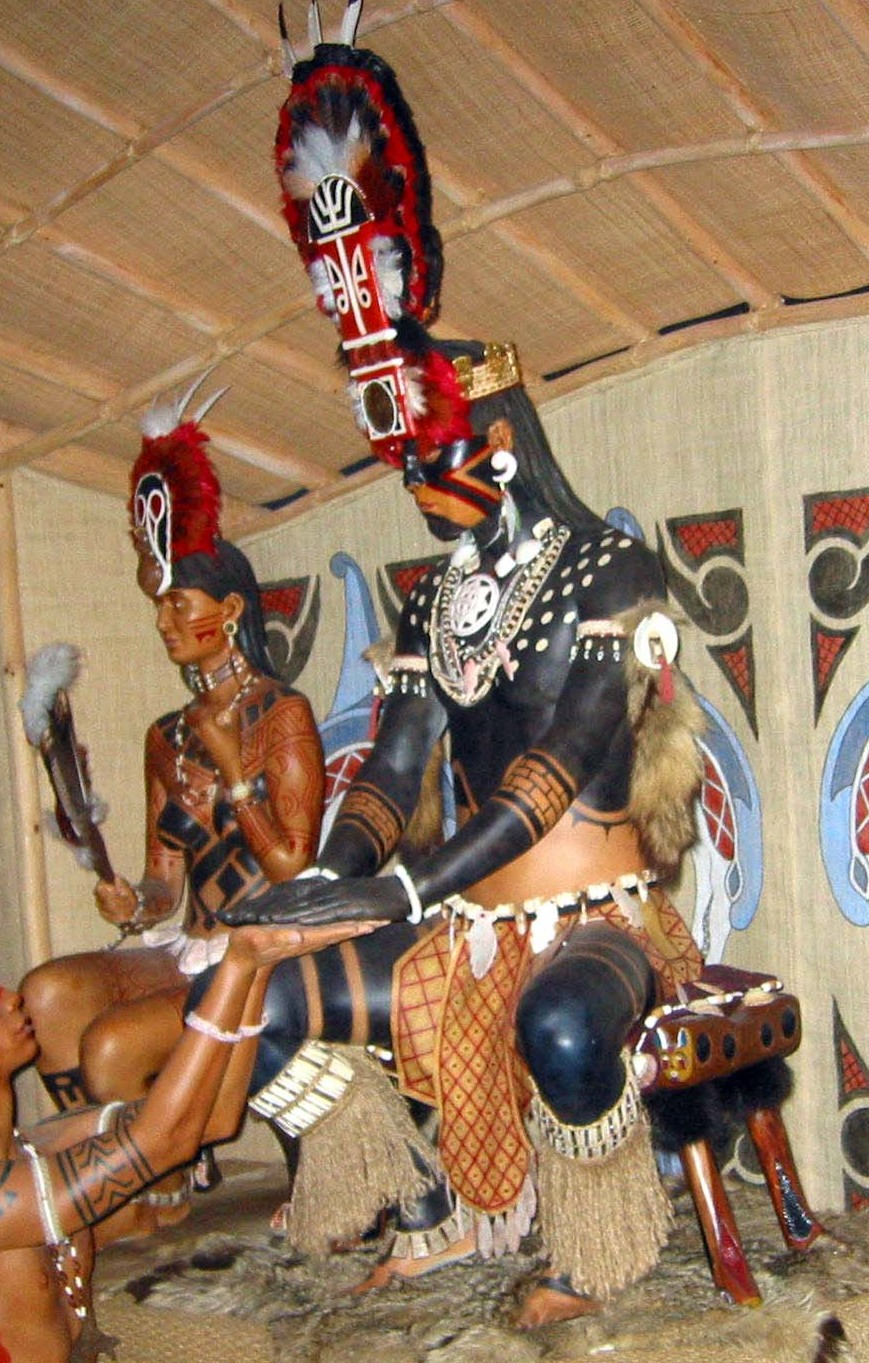
- Diorama of Carlos (right) and his principal wife (left) at the Florida Museum of Natural History

King of the Calusa
- Reign: c. 1556 - 1567
- Predecessor: Senquene (Carlos I)
- Successor: Felipe (installed)
- Born: Southwest Florida
- Died: 1567; Havana, Cuba
- Spouse: Antonia
Posthumous name
- Carlos II

Carlos, also known as Calos or King Calusa (died 1567), was king or paramount chief of the Calusa people of Southwest Florida from about 1556 until his death. As his father, the preceding king, was also known as Carlos, he is sometimes called Carlos II. Carlos ruled over one of the most powerful and prosperous chiefdoms in the region at the time, controlling the coastal areas of southwest Florida and wielding influence throughout the southern peninsula. Contemporary Europeans recognized him as the most powerful chief in Florida.

Carlos inherited the throne from his father, who had been installed as regent while the designated heir, Felipe, was too young to rule. Carlos' father bypassed Felipe in favor of Carlos, creating tension between Carlos' and Felipe's families. Felipe served as war chief and was seen as a stronger leader by many Calusa.

Carlos was chief at the time of contact with the Spanish under Pedro Menéndez de Avilés in 1566. At this time, Carlos faced internal political pressure from Felipe as well as war with external enemies, most notably the Tocobaga around Tampa Bay. As a result, he initially sought an alliance with the Spanish. The alliance soon failed due to the conflicting aims of the two parties, and the relationship between the Calusa and the Spanish turned violent. Eventually Carlos was captured and executed by Spanish officers. Felipe succeeded him as chief.

== Background and succession ==
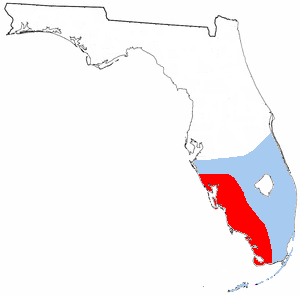
Approximate Calusa core territory (red) and sphere of influence (blue) in Carlos' time

During Carlos' time, the Calusa were a major power in Florida. Both the Spanish and French colonists considered Carlos the most powerful chief in the region. The Calusa did not practice substantive agriculture, but the abundant supply of fish and shellfish in their territory supported their large, sedentary population. They controlled the southwest Florida coast from Charlotte Harbor south to the Florida Bay and wielded influence over most peoples in the southern part of the peninsula, possibly stretching as far north as Cape Canaveral. Calusa society was highly organized, with considerable power vested in the chief. The chief's power derived from their paramount place in the Calusa religious system as well as their ability to control and distribute trade goods. William McGoun writes that the Calusa represented a highly stratified chiefdom, and may have been emerging as a state. This interpretation is based on Carlos' succession controversy, which suggests that power was at least partly vested in the institution of the throne rather than a hereditary line.

Carlos inherited the chiefdom from his father and predecessor, whose name was given as Senquene by shipwreck survivor Hernando de Escalante Fontaneda, a prisoner of the Calusa from about 1549 to 1566. Senquene is known in other Spanish sources as Carlos, leading scholars sometimes to call his son Carlos II. In 1568, Jesuit missionary Juan Rogel wrote an account of the contentious succession of the recent kings, based on Calusa informants, which scholars have parsed to develop a model of the succession leading up to Carlos.

Queen	King
King's daughter

Sister	War chief
Felipe

Senquene (Carlos I)	Senquene's wife
Carlos II

Senquene was originally the chief priest, serving under his brother, the king. Their sister was married to the war chief (a position known to the Spanish as "captain general") with whom she had a son, who was eventually known to the Spanish as Felipe. The king had no sons of his own. As the Calusa, unusually among Southeastern peoples, apparently practiced patrilineal succession, the king named Felipe his heir. He formally adopted Felipe and married him to his daughter. However, the king died while Felipe was still too young to rule. Senquene and Felipe's father agreed that Senquene should rule temporarily until Felipe came of age. After Senquene took the kingship, Carlos was born. Senquene reneged on his vow to step down; he named Carlos his successor and had the previous king's daughter divorced from Felipe and remarried to Carlos. He placated Felipe's enraged family by naming Felipe the next captain general and arranging a marriage to one of his own daughters. This development caused unease for many Calusa, who saw it as a usurpation.

Carlos II had an older sister, later baptized Antonia, whom he loved greatly. By the time of contact with the Spanish, Antonia was one of Carlos' wives (according to Spanish reports Calusa chiefs were expected to take their sister as one of their wives). His queen or principal wife, whose name is unknown, was the sister of Felipe. Carlos had several other wives, many of whom were daughters of his vassal chiefs.

== Kingship ==
Carlos likely rose to the kingship in the 1550s; William Marquart suggests 1556 based on events that happened that year. Carlos' succession evidently inspired challenges from other powerful chiefdoms. In 1556, the daughter of Oathchaqua, chief of the Ais of Cape Canaveral, set out for Calusa to cement an alliance between their peoples by marrying Carlos. During the journey, she was captured by the chief of the Surruque or Serrope, who took her as his own wife. In doing so, Chief Surruque challenged Carlos' authority, disrupted the key alliance and trading route between the Calusa and Ais, and positioned himself as a significant power. A few years later, the Tocobaga of Tampa Bay asserted themselves by capturing twelve Calusa nobles, including the sister of Carlos' wife. Beset with problems, Carlos struggled to respond.

Carlos reigned at the time of contact with the Spanish under Pedro Menéndez de Avilés. Menéndez arrived in the Calusa region in 1566, five months after establishing the settlement of St. Augustine in northeast Florida and ejecting the French Huguenots from their settlement of Fort Caroline. The Spanish landed at Carlos' capital, Calos, probably on Mound Key. Menéndez' primary goal in the voyage was to secure the release of Spanish shipwreck survivors living among the Calusa, including his son Juan.

Carlos jumped at the chance for an alliance with the powerful foreigners. He hoped such an alliance would help against his people's enemies, in particular the Tocabaga. He also may have hoped it would give him the upper hand in his rivalry with Felipe, whom the Spanish chronicler Gonzalo Solís de Merás wrote was even more feared by his people than Carlos himself. According to historian Stephen Edward Reilly, this power struggle was the primary reason Carlos pursued an alliance with the Spanish.

Carlos attempted to solidify the alliance with the Spanish by offering to wed his sister Antonia to Menéndez, who very reluctantly accepted. He allowed the Spanish to establish a small outpost and a Jesuit mission, San Antón de Carlos, near the main town of Calos. He also sent several prominent Calusa, including Felipe, a certain Sebastian, and Sebastian's son Pedro (relatives of Carlos), on a trip to Havana. However, relations with the Spanish soon soured. Carlos did reluctantly release his captive shipwreck survivors, but was angered when Menéndez refused to aid him against the Tocobaga. He was further dismayed when Menéndez put off consummating his marriage to Antonia (Solís de Merás is unclear as to whether they ever consummated the union).

== Death and aftermath ==
Thereafter, the relationship between the Calusa and the Spanish took a violent turn, as Carlos repeatedly plotted against the Spanish. He attempted three times to assassinate Menéndez. After Menéndez's departure, the Calusa were continuously hostile towards the Spanish outpost and its commander, Francisco de Reinoso. Reinoso wanted to fight back, but was prevented from doing so by Father Juan de Rogel, who led Mission San Antón. In Spring 1567, Reinoso managed to compel Rogel to journey to Havana, allowing him to strike against the Calusa. Reinoso had Carlos captured and killed, along with his advisers, and installed Felipe in his place.

Felipe proved a stronger king than Carlos, and therefore a greater danger to the Spanish. Though he appeased the Spanish by ostensibly converting to Christianity, he did not abandon the traditional religious practice or the power it afforded him. In 1569, the Calusa attacked the landing party of Pedro Menéndez Márquez. Menéndez Márquez repelled the attack and had Felipe and twenty of his supporters killed. Pedro, whom Spanish sources call Carlos' "first cousin", succeeded Felipe as chief of the Calusa. Pedro was no more compliant than his predecessors had been, and the Spanish abandoned the region.
