= San Antón de Carlos =

San Antón de Carlos of Mound Key Site
- IUCN category IV (habitat/species management area)
- Location within Florida
- Location: Lee County, Florida, USA
- Nearest city: Fort Myers Beach, Florida
- Coordinates: 26°25′20″N 81°51′55″W
- Established: August 12, 1970
- Governing body: Florida Department of Environmental Protection

San Antonio de Carlos, established in 1567, was the first Jesuit mission in the New World. The site is located in what is now Mound Key Archaeological State Park off Estero Bay in Florida and what was the cultural center of the Calusa or Calos people, who lived in the area for more than 2,000 years.

== Background ==
In the 1500s, the Spanish began exploring the Florida peninsula and the Caribbean. Juan Ponce de León, who came to the area in 1513, was the first contact between the Calusa and Europeans. He was injured when he was shot by an arrow in the thigh by a Calusa warrior, and died as the result of the injury.

King Caalus, also known as Carlos, ruled more than 20,000 Calusas people of southern Florida in the mid 1500s. He had a large house that held up to 2,000 people on Mound Key, an island created from disposed clam and oyster shells. The Calusa people, who lived in a number of villages, primarily ate shellfish, turtles, and fish for their sustenance. They supplemented their diet with food they gathered and hunted, including birds and deer.

== History ==
Pedro Menéndez de Avilés, was appointed as Spain's first Governor of Florida in 1566. Menéndez arrived to the area with 200 soldiers, some of whom were musicians who played fifes, trumpets, and drums. They built a fort, which included a Jesuit mission. Many of the native Calusa people died as the result of diseases brought to them by the Spanish and for which they had no immunity. The Spanish abandoned the site by 1569, due to the resistance of the Calusa against colonization.

== Aftermath ==
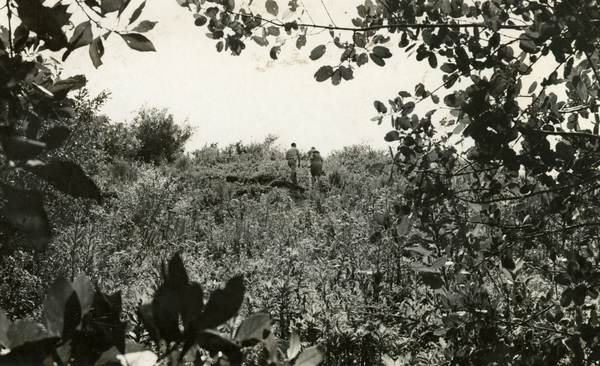
Koreshans walking on Calusa-built mounds on Mound Key, around 1900.

In 1697, Franciscan friars attempted to convert the Calusa people. The friars' naked and nearly dead bodies were later found inside their canoes in the Florida Keys. Most of the Calusa people died off as the result of disease and warfare from armed local tribes around 1750. Any remaining people went to Cuba or the Florida Keys by the end of the 18th century. Fisherman and pirates occupied the site until the late 19th century. In 1891, the land was homesteaded by Frank Johnson. In 1905, the Johnson's land, and that of others who moved into the area, was sold to the utopian group, the Koreshans. It is now an archaeological site.

== Archaeological study ==
The Spanish fort and mission of San Antón de Carlos, at the capital of the Calusa, are part of the Mound Key (8LL2) archaeological study. The paper, published in 2018, reports on the evidence of the fortification and structures of the colonial period.
