= Estero, Florida =

- Village
- Village of Estero
- Logo
- Motto: Life Flourishes in the Estuary.
- Location in Lee County, Florida
- Coordinates: 26°25′52″N 81°46′15″W
- Country: United States
- State: Florida
- County: Lee
- Incorporated (village): December 31, 2014

Government
  - Type: Mayor–council

Area
  - Total: 25.39 sq mi (65.76 km^{2})
  - Land: 24.37 sq mi (63.12 km^{2})
  - Water: 1.02 sq mi (2.64 km^{2})
- Elevation: 16 ft (4.9 m)

Population (2020)
  - Total: 36,939
  - Density: 1,515.8/sq mi (585.25/km^{2})
- Time zone: UTC-5 (Eastern (EST))
  - Summer (DST): UTC-4 (EDT)
- ZIP codes: 33928, 33967
- Area code: 239
- FIPS code: 12-21150
- GNIS feature ID: 2771501
- Website: estero-fl.gov

Estero ( Spanish for "estuary") is an incorporated village in Lee County, Florida, United States, located directly beside the first aquatic nature preserve established in Florida: The Estero Bay Aquatic Preserve, otherwise referred to as Estero Bay Preserve State Park which is within Estero Bay, Florida. At the time of the 2010 census, Estero was an unincorporated community and census-designated place, but incorporated as a village on the last calendar date of 2014. It is part of the Cape Coral-Fort Myers, Florida Metropolitan Statistical Area. As of the 2020 census, the population was 36,939.

Sandwiched along Florida's Gulf Coast between Naples to the south and Fort Myers to the north, Estero is known as a popular destination for high-end shopping and dining as well as for exploring history and wildlife at its two state parks: Mound Key Archaeological State Park, which is only attainable by boat, canoe, or kayak and the Koreshan State Historic Site. Estero is also known for its many golfing opportunities as there are 11 golf courses within its borders consisting of 5 public and 6 private courses. There are also another 89 golf courses within 20 miles (32 km) of Estero, including 23 public, 1 municipal, and 65 private courses. Estero encompasses some 35 gated communities and is recognized as one of the safest places in Florida.

Estero is the home of Hertz Arena, which hosts the home games for the Florida Everblades ECHL ice hockey team. Florida Gulf Coast University borders the Estero village limits and the Southwest Florida International Airport is located less than 5 miles (8 km) to the north of Estero. The corporate headquarters of Hertz Corporation is located in Estero.

In 2019, Estero was ranked No. 8 by USA Today for cities where the most people own their homes for having a homeownership rate of 85.5%.

== History ==
Mound Key, located in Estero Bay, is believed to have been the ceremonial center of the Calusa Indians when they were encountered by the Spanish in the early 1500s. German homesteader Gustave Damkohler began planting mulberry trees in 1882 along the Estero River, followed by others who established fish camps and the region's first citrus groves. In 1894, Damkohler donated property to the followers of Cyrus Teed, who proposed a theory that people live on the inside of the Earth's outer skin, and that celestial bodies are all contained inside the hollow Earth. This theory, which he called Koreshan Unity, drew followers to occupy and develop Damkohler's original 320-acre (1.3 km^{2}) tract. They were business-oriented and lived communally, prospering enough to found their own political party ("The Progressive Liberty Party") and incorporate the town on September 1, 1904, as Estero. At the behest of other local officials, the Florida legislature abolished the municipality of Estero in 1907.

During the 1910 US census, the population was 299. By the 1920 US census, it increased to 340 residents.

The 1908 death of Teed (who claimed to be immortal) was a critical blow to the group's faith, whose membership dwindled into the 1960s. The foundation remains as "The College of Life Foundation", which contributed (for example) at least $25,000 to the Gulf Shore Playhouse in or around 2007. The Koreshans' original tract is now owned by Florida as the Koreshan State Historic Site.

Access to Estero was greatly improved in the 1920s when Tamiami Trail, a highway linking Tampa and Miami, and two railroads were built through the area. Tamiami Trail was fully complete in 1928. The Atlantic Coast Line Railroad (via its Fort Myers Southern Railroad subsidiary) began service through Estero in 1925. A competing railroad, the Seaboard Air Line Railroad also built a rail line through Estero in 1927. Today, the former Atlantic Coast Line tracks are still in place east of US 41 and have been owned by Seminole Gulf Railway since 1987. The former Seaboard tracks were removed in the 1940s and its former route west of US 41 is now an FPL power line corridor.

Estero incorporated as a village on December 31, 2014.

== Geography ==
The Village of Estero is located in southern Lee County. It is bordered to the south by the city of Bonita Springs and to the north by unincorporated San Carlos Park and Three Oaks.

According to the United States Census Bureau, the village of Estero has a total area of 25.4 square miles (65.7 km^{2}), of which 24.4 square miles (63.1 km^{2}) are land and 1.0 square mile (2.7 km^{2}), or 4.05%, are water.

Historically and culturally, the heart of Estero is the spring-fed Estero River, which flows to Estero Bay. Some of the earliest settlers of the area (notably the Alvarez, Fernandez, Johnson, and Soto families) were fishing families that lived on Mound Key, a mangrove-ringed island that dominates Estero Bay. During the early 20th century, these families moved upriver to the settlement which came to be known as Estero. Estero is also the location of a utopian community called the Koreshan Unity, which is now preserved as the Koreshan State Historic Site. Until the 1970s, most settlement and development in Estero was near the river.

== Demographics ==
Historical population
Census	Pop.	Note	%±
1990	3,177		—
2000	9,503		199.1%
2010	22,612		137.9%
2020	36,939		63.4%
U.S. Decennial Census; 1990

=== Racial and ethnic composition ===
Estero racial composition (Hispanics excluded from racial categories) (NH = Non-Hispanic)
Race	Pop 2010	Pop 2020	% 2010	% 2020
White (NH)	20,596	31,834	91.08%	86.18%
Black or African American (NH)	215	499	0.95%	1.35%
Native American or Alaska Native (NH)	18	27	0.08%	0.07%
Asian (NH)	291	750	1.29%	2.03%
Pacific Islander or Native Hawaiian (NH)	5	15	0.02%	0.04%
Some other race (NH)	19	105	0.08%	0.28%
Two or more races/Multiracial (NH)	141	825	0.62%	2.23%
Hispanic or Latino (any race)	1,327	2,884	5.87%	7.81%
Total	22,612	36,939		

=== 2020 census ===
As of the 2020 census, Estero had a population of 36,939. The median age was 64.5 years. 10.0% of residents were under the age of 18 and 49.0% of residents were 65 years of age or older. For every 100 females there were 90.5 males, and for every 100 females age 18 and over there were 88.4 males age 18 and over.

99.9% of residents lived in urban areas, while 0.1% lived in rural areas.

There were 18,116 households in Estero, of which 11.9% had children under the age of 18 living in them. Of all households, 57.9% were married-couple households, 13.5% were households with a male householder and no spouse or partner present, and 23.4% were households with a female householder and no spouse or partner present. About 27.5% of all households were made up of individuals and 17.4% had someone living alone who was 65 years of age or older.

There were 25,854 housing units, of which 29.9% were vacant. The homeowner vacancy rate was 2.0% and the rental vacancy rate was 14.7%.

=== 2010 census ===
As of the 2010 United States census, there were 22,612 people, 10,444 households, and 7,484 families residing in the village.

=== 2000 census ===
As of the census of 2000, there were 9,503 people, 4,608 households, and 3,336 families residing in Estero. The population density was 450.7 inhabitants per square mile (174.0/km^{2}). There were 7,345 housing units at an average density of 348.4 per square mile (134.5/km^{2}). The racial makeup of the community was 97.43% White, 0.64% African American, 0.11% Native American, 0.35% Asian, 0.01% Pacific Islander, 0.77% from other races, and 0.69% from two or more races. Hispanic or Latino of any race were 3.19% of the population.

As of 2000, there were 4,608 households, out of which 10.0% had children under the age of 18 living with them, 68.2% were married couples living together, 2.8% had a female householder with no husband present, and 27.6% were non-families. 23.4% of all households were made up of individuals, and 12.4% had someone living alone who was 65 years of age or older. The average household size was 2.01 and the average family size was 2.31.

In 2000, in the community, the population was spread out, with 9.2% under the age of 18, 4.9% from 18 to 24, 14.1% from 25 to 44, 31.1% from 45 to 64, and 40.6% who were 65 years of age or older. The median age was 61 years. For every 100 females, there were 93.1 males. For every 100 females age 18 and over, there were 92.6 males.

In 2000, the median income for a household in Estero was $43,734, and the median income for a family was $51,227. Males had a median income of $38,886 versus $27,883 for females. The per capita income for the CDP was $30,521. About 1.9% of families and 3.2% of the population were below the poverty line, including 1.1% of those under age 18 and 3.2% of those age 65 or over.

=== 2022 ACS 5-year estimates ===
As of the 2022 American Community Survey 5-year estimates, the median income for a household in the village of Estero was $100,543, the median income for a family was $114,112 and the median income for married-couple families was $119,269.

== Economy ==
On May 7, 2013, the Hertz Corporation announced it was moving its corporate headquarters and about 750 jobs to Estero from its former bases at Park Ridge, New Jersey and Tulsa, Oklahoma. Hertz built a $75 million building at the southeast corner of US-41 and Williams Road on a previously vacant lot and cleared parcel that already contained a retention pond. The land is immediately south of Corkscrew Village and about 1 mile (1.5 km) north of Coconut Point Mall.

== Arts and culture ==
Estero is home to the Art Council of Southwest Florida which runs the nonprofit cooperative COCO Art Gallery at Coconut Point Mall in Estero, Florida. In 2023 the Artistic & Operations Center for the Southwest Florida Symphony relocated to Coconut Point Mall in Estero, Florida. In addition to the Coconut Point shopping center, Estero is also home to Miromar Outlets, with over 140 stores and the 400,000-square-foot (37,000 m^{2}) Miromar Design Center.

== Parks and recreation ==
Estero is home to two state parks Mound Key Archaeological State Park and the Koreshan State Historic Site. Additionally it is home to the Estero Park and Recreation Center. As of April 2024 the Estero government is in the planning stages for an approved Estero Entertainment Center to be built via a privet public partnership on land owned by the Village of Estero.
