= Coconut Point =

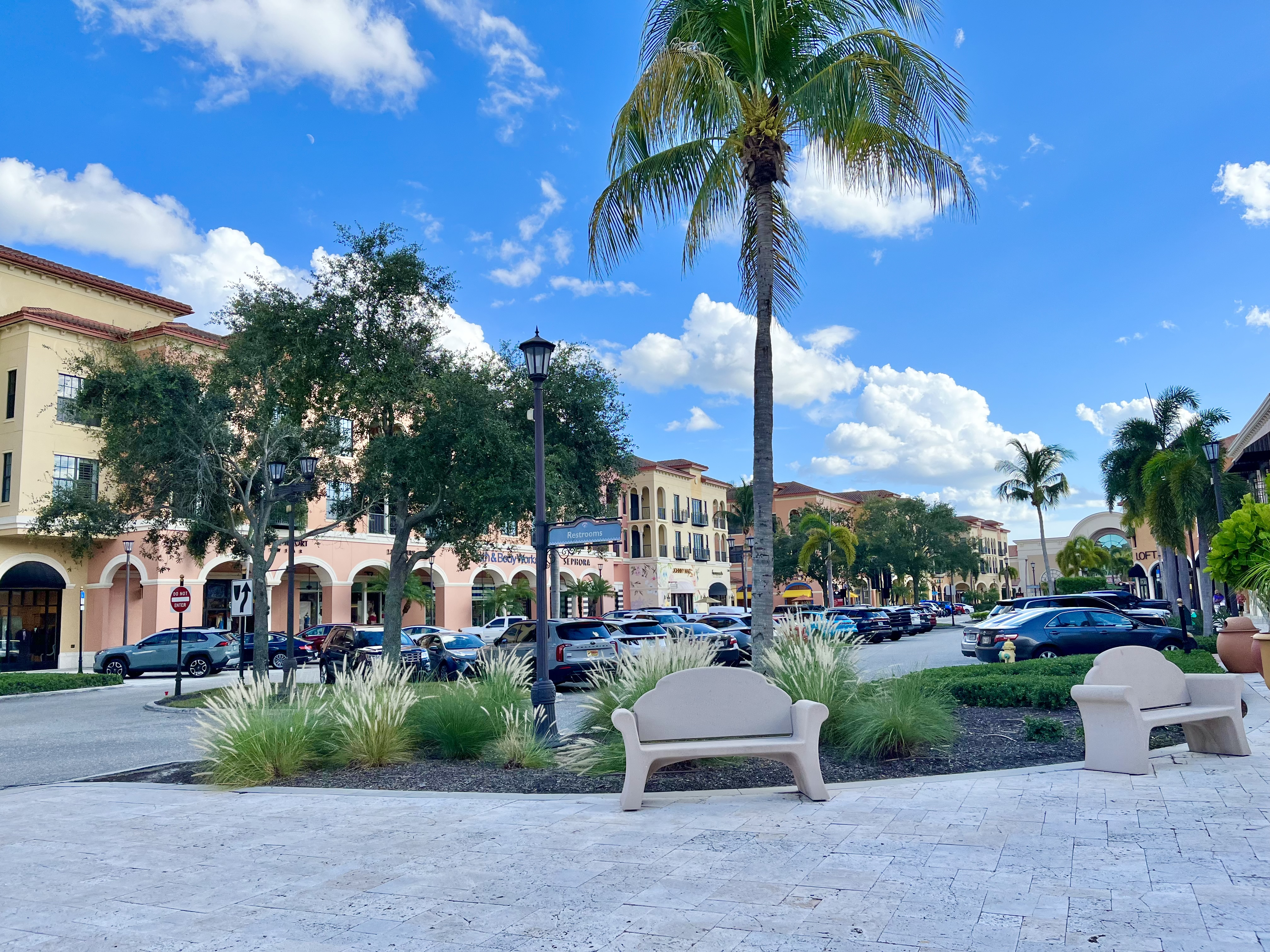
- Location: Estero, Florida, U.S.
- Coordinates: 26.404207°N 81.807709°W
- Opened: November 10, 2006
- Developer: Simon Property Group
- Manager: Simon Property Group
- Owner: Simon Property Group
- Num. of stores: 120
- Floor area: 1,205,363 square feet (111,981.9 m^{2})
- Public transit: LeeTran
- Website: www.simon.com/mall/coconut-point

Coconut Point is a shopping center located in Estero, Florida, United States. Opened in 2006, it consists of a lifestyle center with Dillard's department store, a power center with Target, and over 120 stores. It also includes a number of apartments and restaurants. The complex was built and developed by Simon Property Group.

== History ==
Shopping mall company Simon Property Group began seeking approval to build a mall in Estero, Florida, in 1999. The company originally named their proposal Suncoast McArdle Mall before choosing the name Coconut Point by 2002. Simon's plans called for a 1,200,000-square-foot (110,000 m^{2}) complex consisting of an outdoor mall, as well as adjacent big-box stores and hotel space. The company selected a site along US 41 south of the village of Estero. The company submitted approval to Lee County government officials in October 2002 after three years of preliminary studies.

The Coconut Point mall opened on November 10, 2006. The mall is managed by the Simon Property Group and was designed by Hollywood, CA studio, 5+design.
