= Mound Key Archaeological State Park =

Archaeological site in Florida, United States

Mound Key Archaeological State Park / Mound Key Site
- IUCN category IV (habitat/species management area)
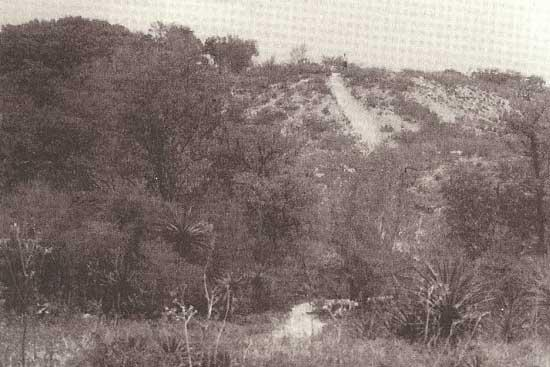

- Location within Florida Location within the United States
- Interactive map of Mound Key Archaeological State Park / Mound Key Site
- Location: Lee County, Florida, United States
- Nearest city: Fort Myers Beach, Florida
- Coordinates: 26°25′20″N 81°51′55″W
- Area: 113 acres (0.46 km^{2})
- Established: August 12, 1970
- Governing body: Florida Department of Environmental Protection

Mound Key Archaeological State Park is a Florida State Park, located in Estero Bay, near the mouth of the Estero River. One hundred and thirteen of the island's one hundred and twenty-five acres are managed by the park system. It is a complex of mounds and accumulated shell, fish bone, and pottery middens that rises more than 30 feet above the waters of the bay.

Mound Key was an important site of the Calusa people, and most experts believe it to be the site of their capital, Calos. The Mound Key Site on the island was added to the U.S. National Register of Historic Places on August 12, 1970. The island is only accessible by boat from the Koreshan State Historic Site or Lovers Key State Park.

== History ==
Mound Key was created over 2,000 years ago by the Calusa. Their culture is carbon-dated back to 1150 B.C. at Mound Key. The site likely began as a low-lying oyster bar on Estero Bay. The site would have been rich in marine food resources, and very appealing to the Calusa, who were actually hunter-gatherers. As the human population grew, food waste was heaped into the middens that form the island. The Calusa formed an extensive structure of mounds, water courts and canals whose features still exist today. Mounds were constructed by the collection and organization of "midden" which is a collaboration of shells, fish and animal bone, and artifacts such as pottery. Islands that were created by the Calusa, such as Mound Key are sometimes called "trash-heaps" as their composition is made from waste products of their culture. They are not however, just "heaps of Calusa garbage" simply tossed aside, but intricate compositions of substrate that were used for a display of power, religious monuments, and as burial memorials. It served for many years as the ceremonial center for their kingdom, which extended over numerous shell midden islands they made up and down the southwest coast of Florida. It is also believed by most researchers to have been the site of Calos, the capital of their kingdom. The island was where King Carlos hosted a wedding for his sister, who was later baptized as Antonia, to Pedro Menéndez de Avilés, a political marriage meant to solidify an alliance with the Spanish. Their kingdom spanned from Tampa Bay southward to the Ten Thousand Islands and eastward to Lake Okeechobee.

The arrival of the Spanish was the beginning of the end for the Calusa. In 1566, the appointment of Spain's first Governor of Florida happened on the island. This was closely followed by the establishment there of a fort and settlement, in an effort to colonize the area. A Jesuit mission was also founded there at the same time by Juan Rogel, a priest of that order. Called San Antón de Carlos, it was the first such mission in the Spanish New World. There was frequent conflict with the Calusa, though, and eventually the island was abandoned by the Spanish in 1569.

The Spanish brought with them diseases to which the Calusa had no immunity. These diseases and warfare with the Spanish eventually ended the Calusa civilization around 1750.

In subsequent years, the island was used and sometimes inhabited by pirates, fishermen (Cuban, Portuguese and Spanish), and American pioneers, among others.

Frank Johnson and his wife, Grandma Johnson, were given a homestead on Mound Key in 1891. This marked a period of European immigration to the former Calusa capital.

Grandma Johnson remained at Mound Key and allowed several families — Luettich, Hawkins, Hanson and Fernandez — to build homes on the island.

She taught them to fish, to farm, how to build houses that would stay cool in the summer and protect them against Florida's abusive sun and summer storms. By the turn of the 20th century, most all Mound Key settlers had moved up river to Estero, then a citrus and cow farming town. The Johnsons sold the island to the Koreshans, a utopian cult, in 1905.

In 1894, the followers of a scientific/religious belief system known as Koreshanity arrived in the area. They built a community based on their utopian ideas, growing over the next two decades. During this time, part of the property they acquired included most of the parcels on Mound Key.

After the death of their leader, Cyrus Teed, in 1908, their numbers declined. In 1961, the remaining Koreshans decided to give over ownership of the key, as well as other land in nearby Estero, to the state. It was used to form the park, which is administered by the Koreshan State Historic Site. Approximately nine acres still remain privately owned by the McGee family. The McGee family agreed to sell their remaining parcel to Lee County in 2019.

In 2020, archeologists confirmed that Mound Key was the site of Fort San Antón de Carlos, which was a Spanish fort as well as one of the first Jesuit sites in North America. The fort was abandoned in 1569, after the Spanish-Calusa alliance broke apart. The fort is also the oldest known North American example of Tabby concrete.

== Recreational Activities ==
The park has such amenities as boating, fishing, wildlife viewing and interpretive exhibits. The only access to the island is by boat; there are no facilities. A 0.75-mile (1.21 km) hiking trail connects the northwest and southeast landings, crosses two large shell mounds, and has interpretive panels about the island and the Calusa. Located in Estero Bay, the park is a few miles by boat from both the Koreshan State Historic Site and Lovers Key / Carl E. Johnson State Park.

== See also ==
- List of Jesuit sites
