= Estero Bay Preserve State Park =

State park in Florida, United States

- IUCN category IV (habitat/species management area)
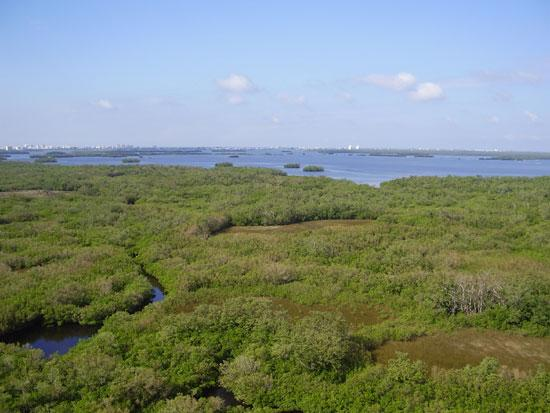

- Location within Florida Location within the United States
- Interactive map of Estero Bay Preserve State Park
- Location: Lee County, Florida, USA
- Nearest city: Estero, Florida
- Coordinates: 26°23′49″N 81°51′34″W
- Area: 10,000 acres (40 km^{2})
- Governing body: Florida Department of Environmental Protection

Estero Bay Preserve State Park, the first aquatic nature preserve established in Florida, is a 10,000-acre (40 km^{2}) Florida State Park located near Estero, between Fort Myers and Naples. It consists of the water, inlets, and islands along 10 miles (16 km) of Estero Bay. Activities include fishing, and boating, bicycling, canoeing, and wildlife viewing. Among the wildlife of the park are gopher tortoises, fiddler crabs, and bald eagles. The park is open from 8:00 A.M. until sundown year-round.

The old rail bed of the Seaboard Air Line Railway can be found near the Florida Power and Light easement headed northwest. This section has now been orphaned as developments to the north and south have isolated this section. The Seaboard Air Line Railway was once one of two railroads that served southwest Florida and serves as a point of interest in the park on a hike.

From the Estero Bay Aquatic Preserve Management Plan
Florida Natural Areas Inventory (FNAI) Natural Community Types
Beach Dune	< 1 acre
Blackwater Stream	207 acres
Mollusk Reef	65 acres
Sponge Bed	< 1 acre
Algal Bed	564 acres
Unconsolidated Substrate	5,675 acres
Coastal Berm	< 1 acre
Seagrass Bed	3,301 acres
Salt Marsh	3 acres
Mangrove Swamp	1,149 acres
Ruderal	67 acres
Other (Privately or publicly-owned uplands)	2,798 acres
Total Acreage	13,829 acres

== Plants ==
- Twisted air plant: State Threatened
- Giant wild pine: State Endangered

== Birds ==
- Red knot: Federally Threatened
- Snowy plover: State Threatened
- Piping plover: Federally Threatened
- Marian's marsh wren: State Threatened
- Little blue heron: State Threatened
- Reddish egret: State Threatened
- Tricolored heron: State Threatened
- Southeastern American kestrel: State Threatened
- American oystercatcher: State Threatened
- Wood stork: Federally Threatened
- Roseate spoonbill: State Threatened
- Black skimmer: State Threatened
- Least tern: State Threatened
- Roseate tern: Federally Threatened

== Reptiles ==
- American alligator: Federally Threatened (similarity of appearance to Threatened Species)
- Atlantic loggerhead turtle: Federally Threatened
- Atlantic green turtle: Federally Threatened
- American crocodile: Federally Threatened
- Leatherback turtle: Federally Endangered
- Atlantic hawksbill turtle: Federally Endangered
- Kemp's ridley turtle: Federally Endangered

== Mammals ==
- Big Cypress fox squirrel: State Threatened
- Florida manatee: Federally Threatened

== Fish ==
- Smalltooth sawfish: Federally Endangered
- Sea Nettle: (type of Jellyfish)
