= Koreshan State Historic Site =

State park in Florida, United States

Koreshan State Park
- IUCN category V (protected landscape/seascape)
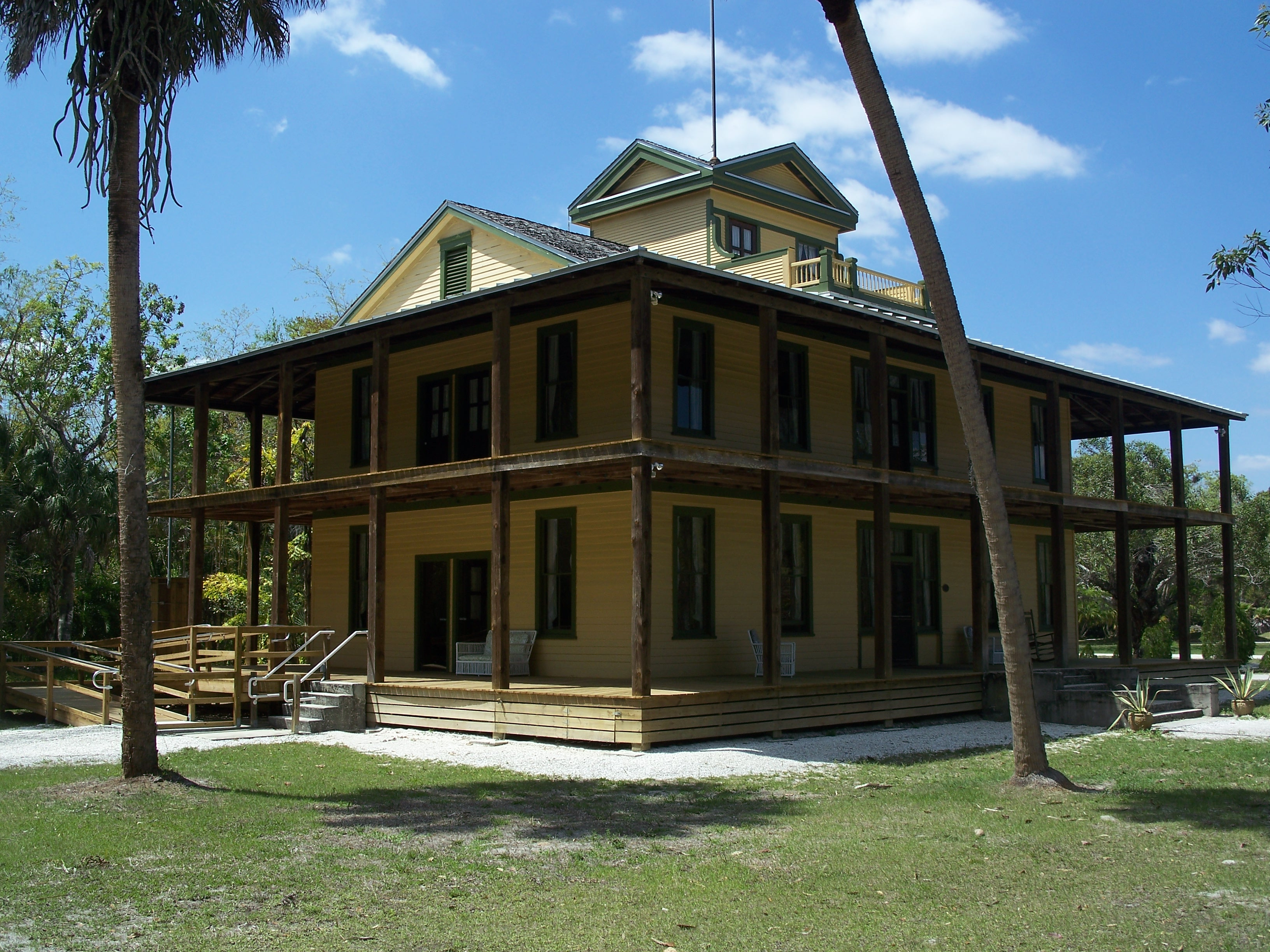
- The Planetary Court

- Location within Florida Location within the United States
- Interactive map of Koreshan State Park
- Location: Lee County, Florida, United States
- Nearest city: Estero, Florida
- Coordinates: 26°26.0′N 81°49.0′W
- Area: 135 acres (0.55 km^{2})
- Governing body: Florida Department of Environmental Protection

The Koreshan State Park is a state park in Estero, Florida located on U.S. Highway 41 at Corkscrew Road. It was also added to the National Register of Historic Places on May 4, 1976, under the designation of Koreshan Unity Settlement Historic District.

It contains areas of pine flatwoods habitat and the site of a religious colony, the Koreshan Unity, whose last members deeded the land to the state in 1961.

== Historic buildings ==
The historic district contains eleven buildings dating from 1882 to 1920, including the Founder’s House, Planetary Court, bakery, machine shops and Art Hall.

== Flora ==
The Koreshans imported a wide range of plant species from across the world, including: an Araucaria bidwillii (false monkey puzzle) tree, which is indigenous to Queensland, Australia, and drops seed pods as large as a football; a number of sausage trees, which are native to Africa and a favored food of giraffes; eucalyptus, mango and other fruit bearing trees; an extraordinary amount of Japanese bamboo that originally hails from the Edison and Ford Winter Estates; and many flowering trees and plants of a wide variety.

== Fauna ==
Among the wildlife of the park are gopher tortoises, bobcats, gray foxes, North American river otters and American alligators. Birds spotted include swallow-tailed kites, bald eagles, northern bobwhites and red-shouldered hawks.

== Recreational activities ==
Activities include fishing, picnicking, and boating, as well as camping, canoeing, hiking, and wildlife viewing. Amenities include a campground, boat ramp, trails and a picnic area on the Estero River. Kayak rentals from Estero Bay Outfitters on the river are available within a relatively short distance outside the park. Koreshan State Park has 60 campsites, 4 of which are glamping sites.

== Hours ==
Florida state parks are open between 8 a.m. and sunset every day of the year (including holidays).

== Gallery ==
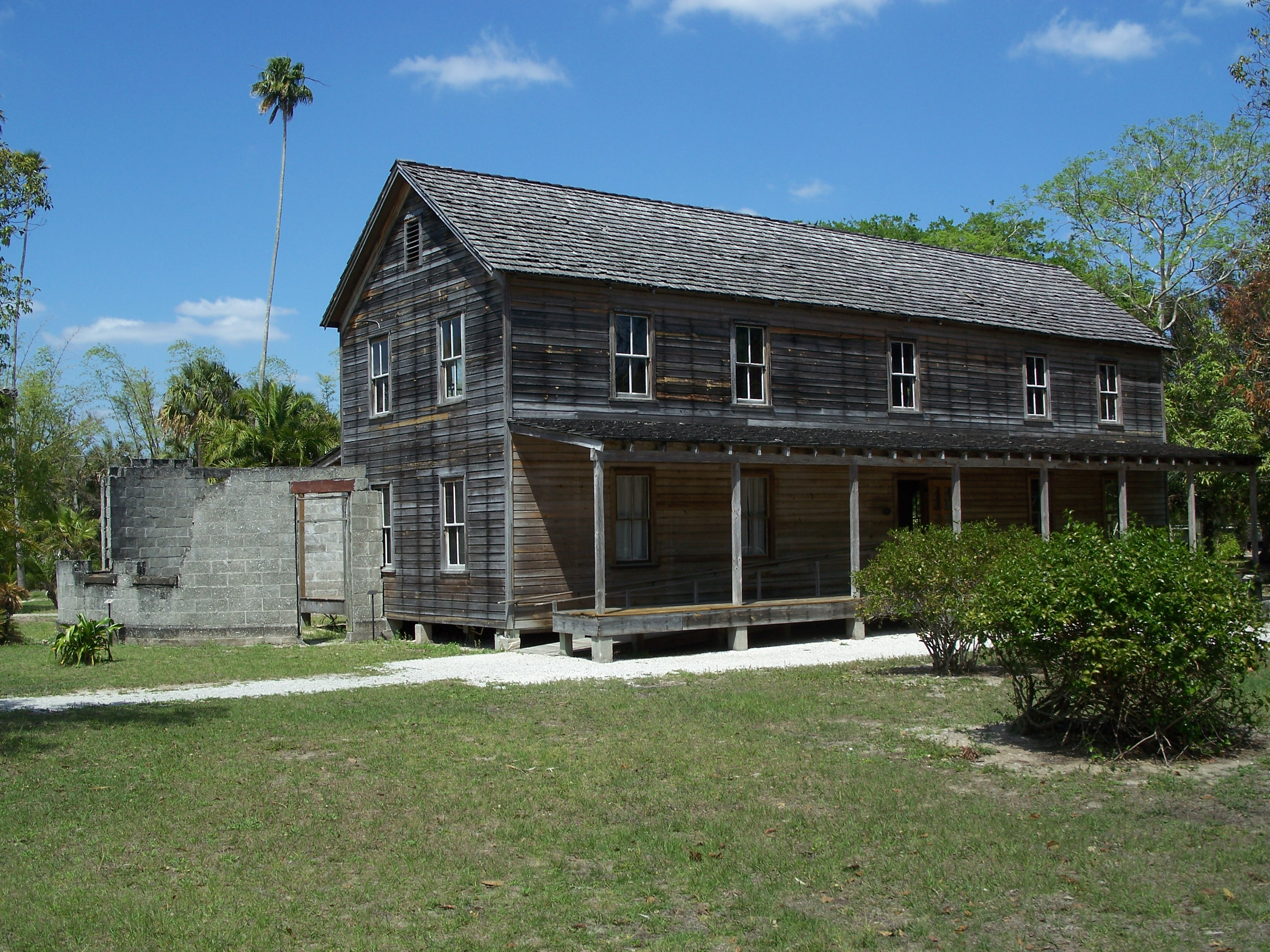
Founder's House.

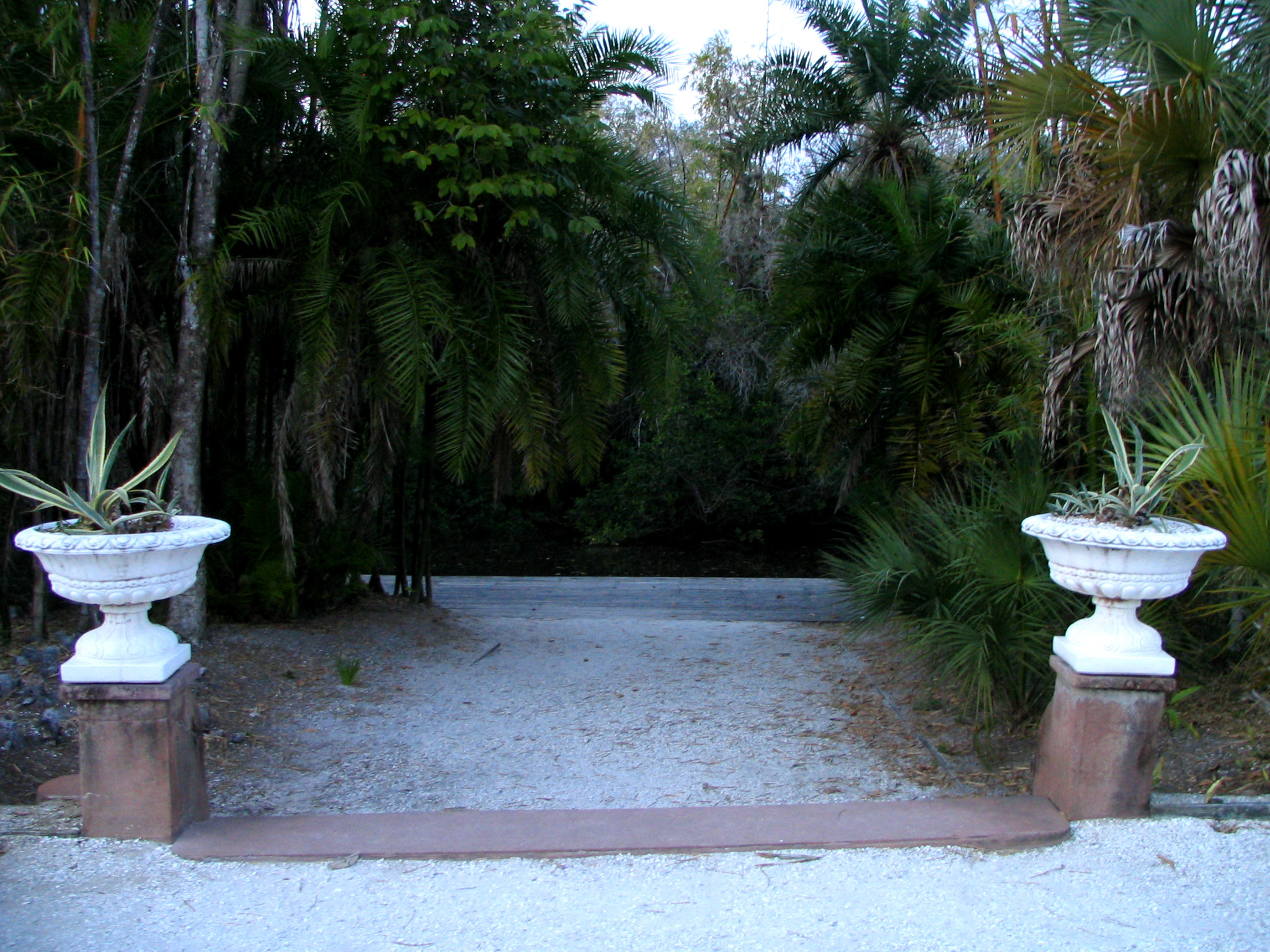
The Bamboo Landing.

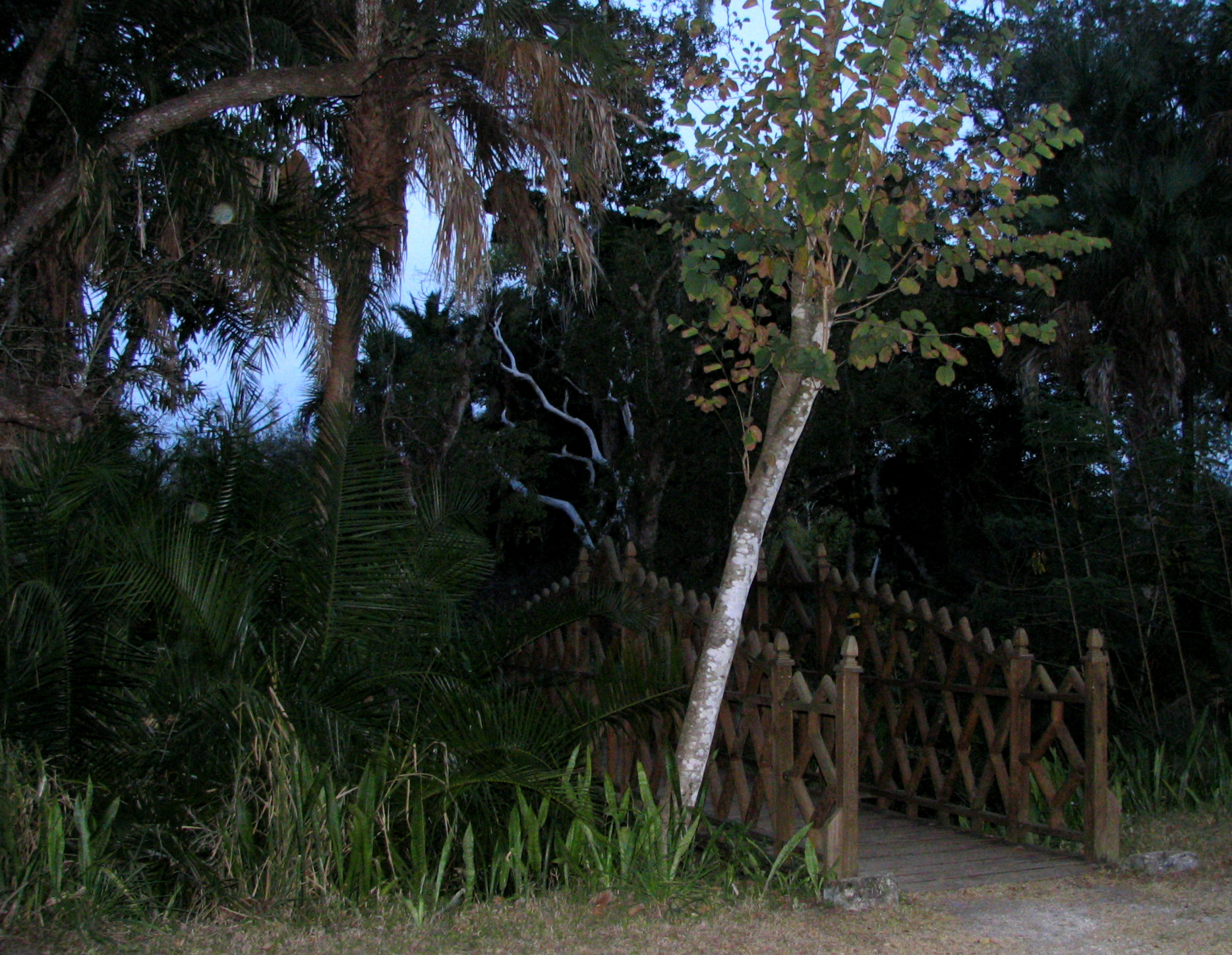
An ornamental bridge.

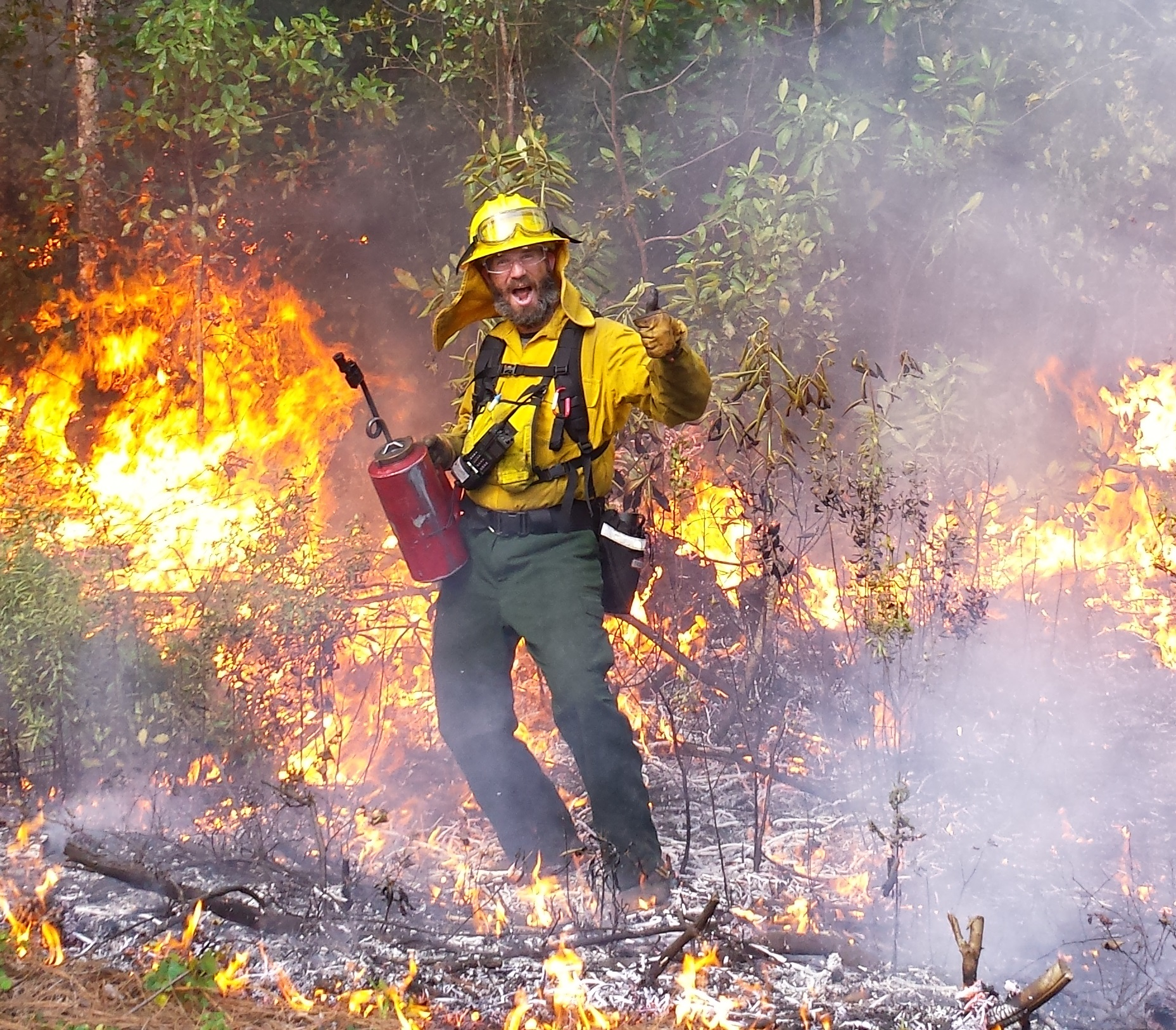
Park staff conducting a prescribed burn.

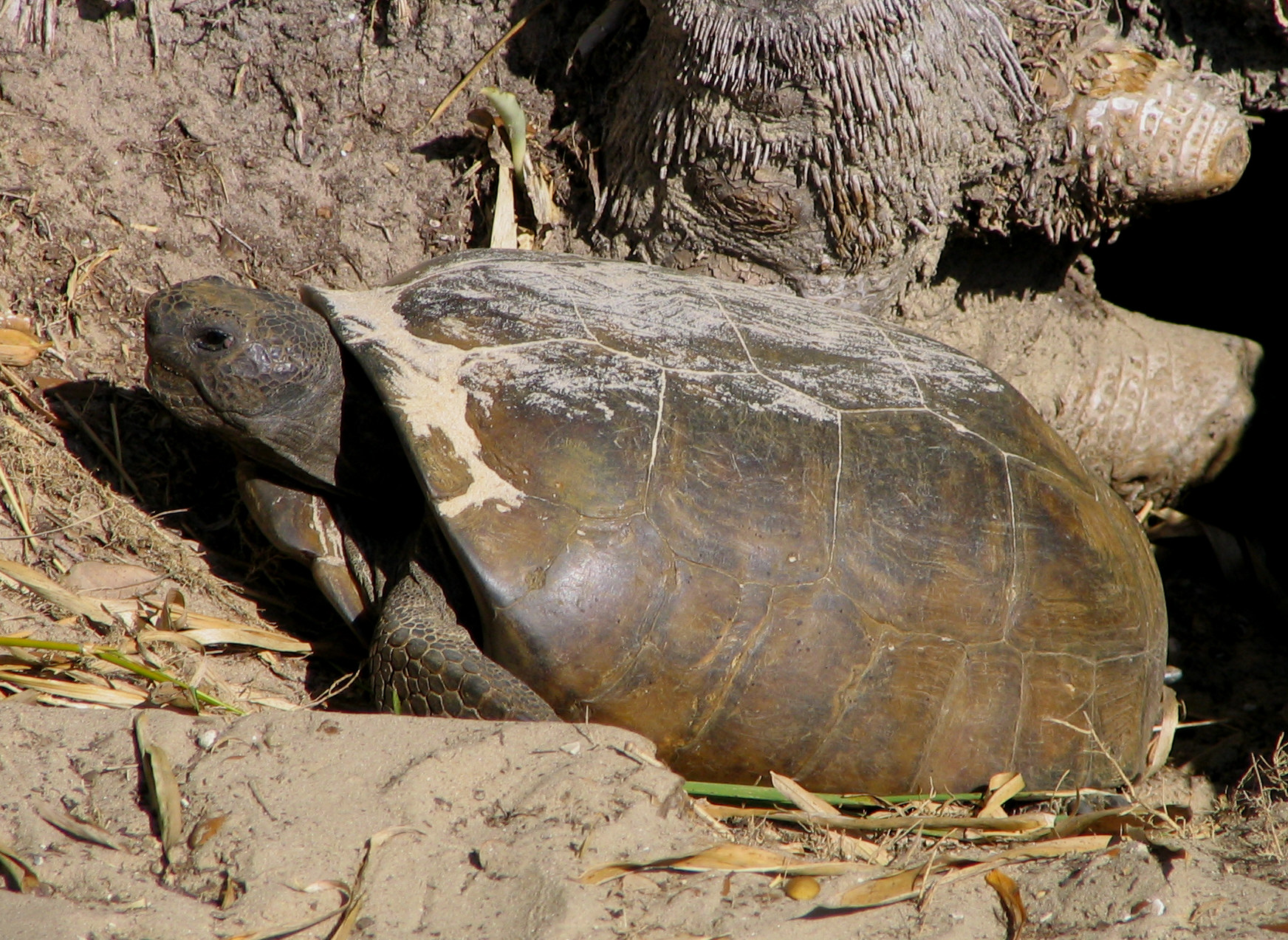
A gopher tortoise in the park.

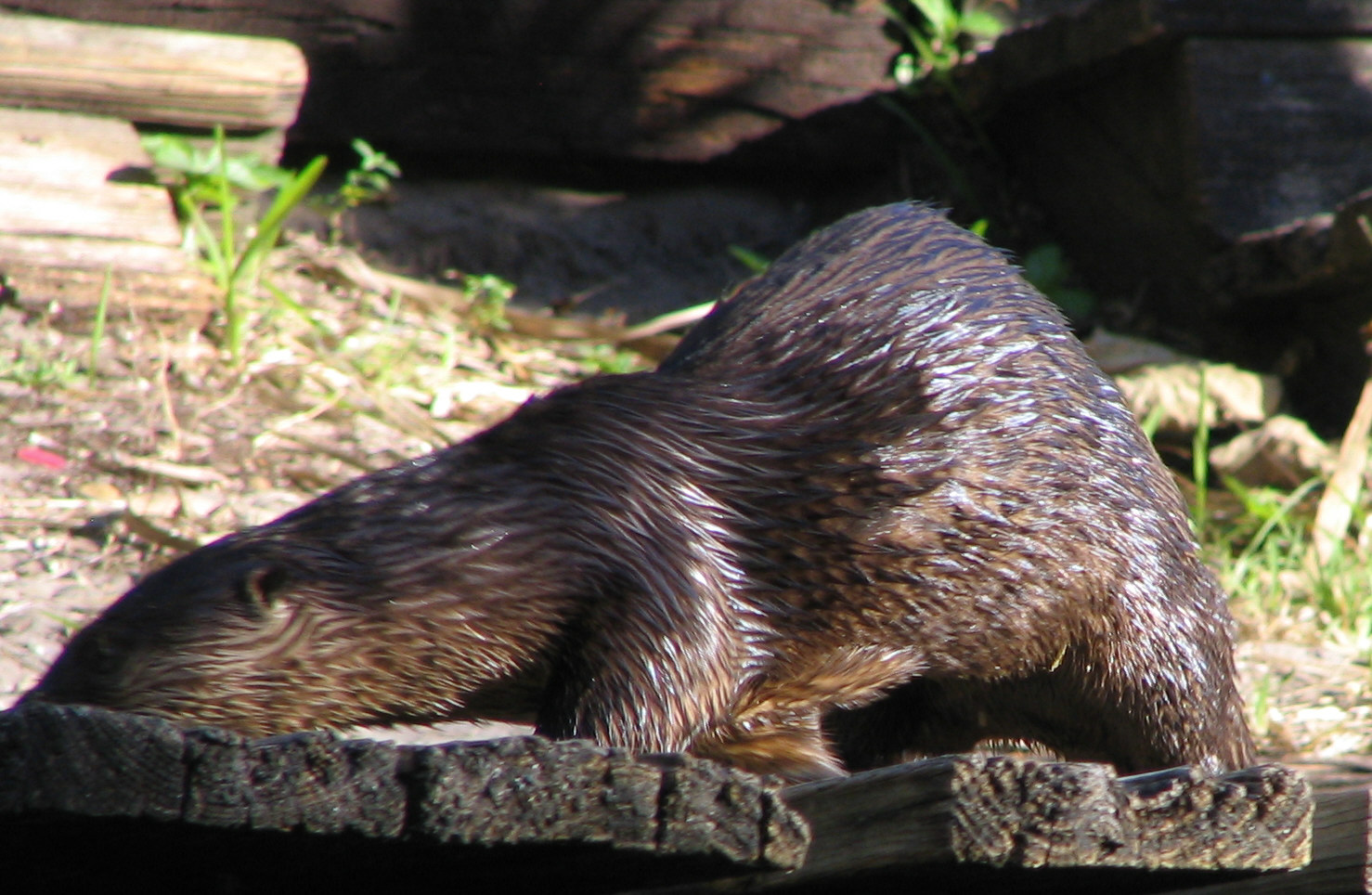
An otter on the Estero River.

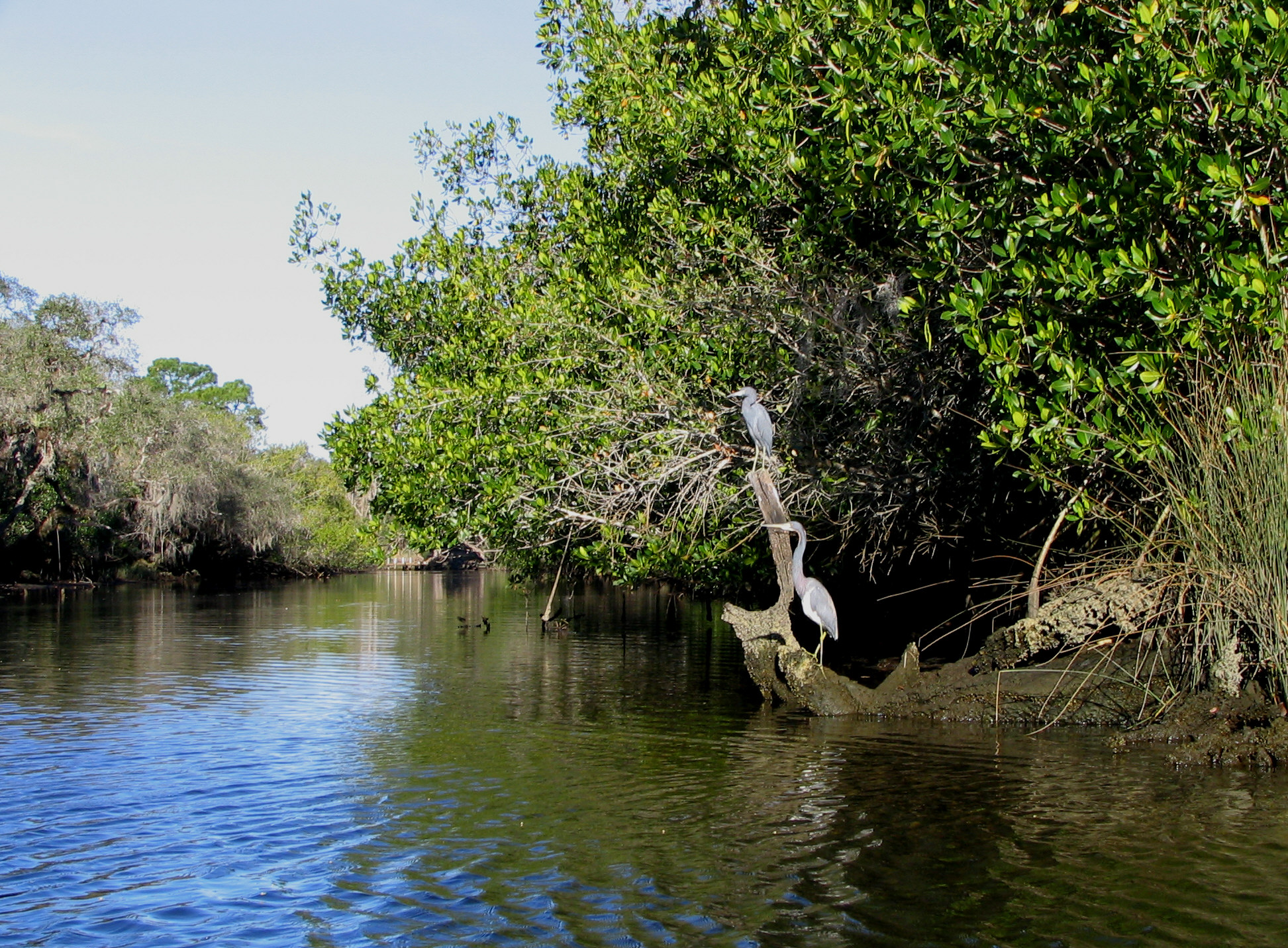
Herons on the Estero.
