= Estero Bay (Florida) =

Estuary southeast of Fort Myers Beach, Florida

Coordinates: 26.40218°N 81.87235°W

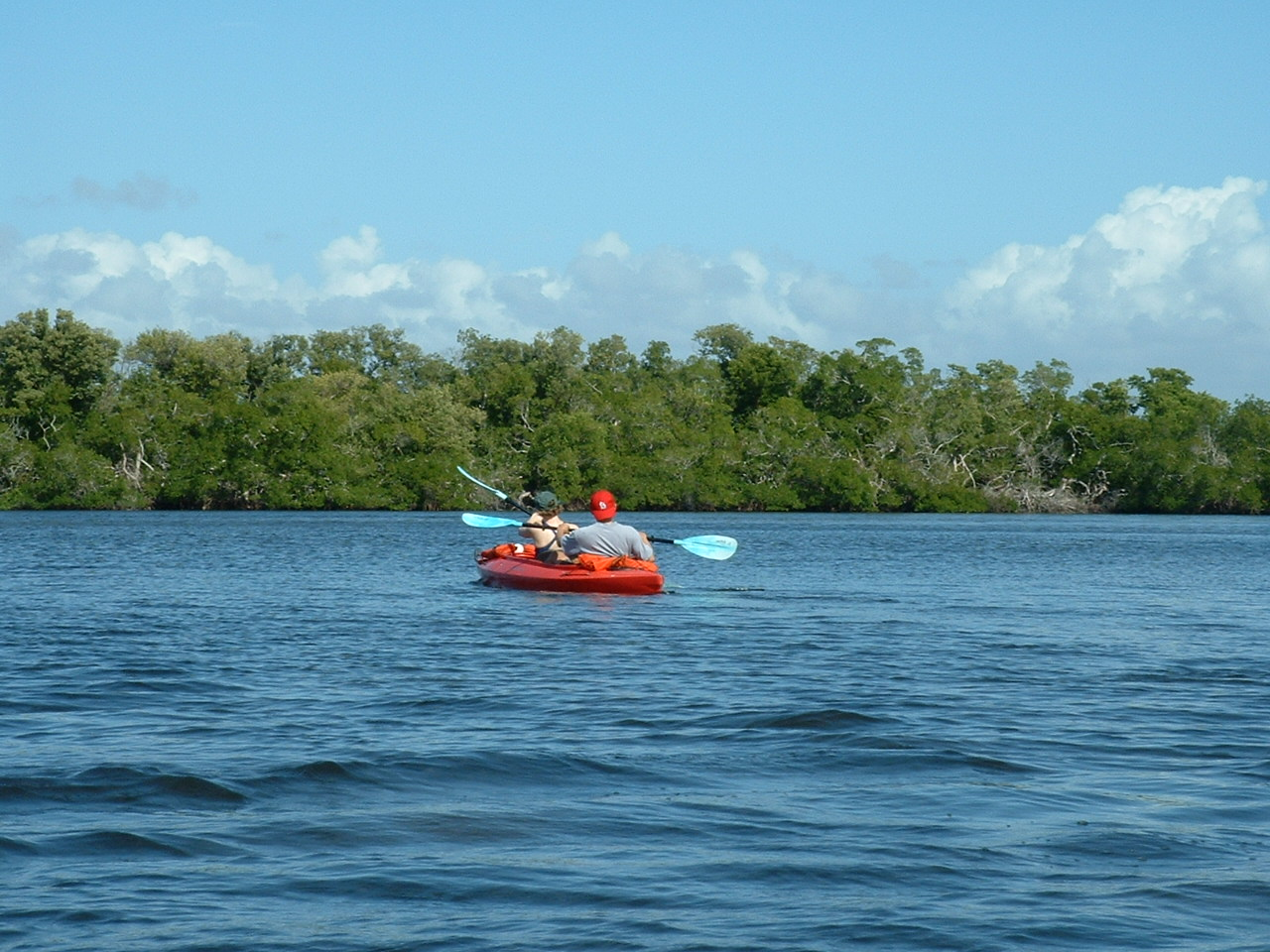
Kayaking on Estero Bay near Fort Myers Beach, Florida

Estero Bay, Florida, is an estuary located on the west coast of the state southeast of Fort Myers Beach. The bay, an inlet of the Gulf of Mexico, is long and very shallow and covers about 15 square miles (39 km^{2}). Estero Bay is bordered on the west by a chain of barrier islands: Estero Island, Long Key, Lovers Key, Black Island, Big Hickory Island, and Little Hickory Island. Four outlets give access to the Gulf of Mexico: (from north to south) Matanzas Pass, Big Carlos Pass, New Pass, and Big Hickory Pass. Incorporated places on the bay include Estero, Bonita Springs and Fort Myers Beach. Two rivers, the Imperial River and the Estero River bring freshwater into the estuary. Tides play a major role in the functionality of the plant, crustaceans, mammals, and fish in the area. The bay is also the location of the Mound Key Archaeological State Park.

In December 1966, the northern half of Estero Bay was designated as the state's first aquatic preserve, the Estero Bay Preserve State Park. The southern half of the bay was added to the preserve during the 1983 Florida Legislature session.

In 2020, archeologists confirmed that Mound Key was the site of Fort San Antón de Carlos. Which was a Spanish fort as well as one of the first Jesuit sites in North America. The confirmation of the site of the Spanish fort also confirms the long-suspected notion that Mound Key is the former capital of the ancient Calusa chiefdom/kingdom.
