= Estero River =

River in Florida, United States

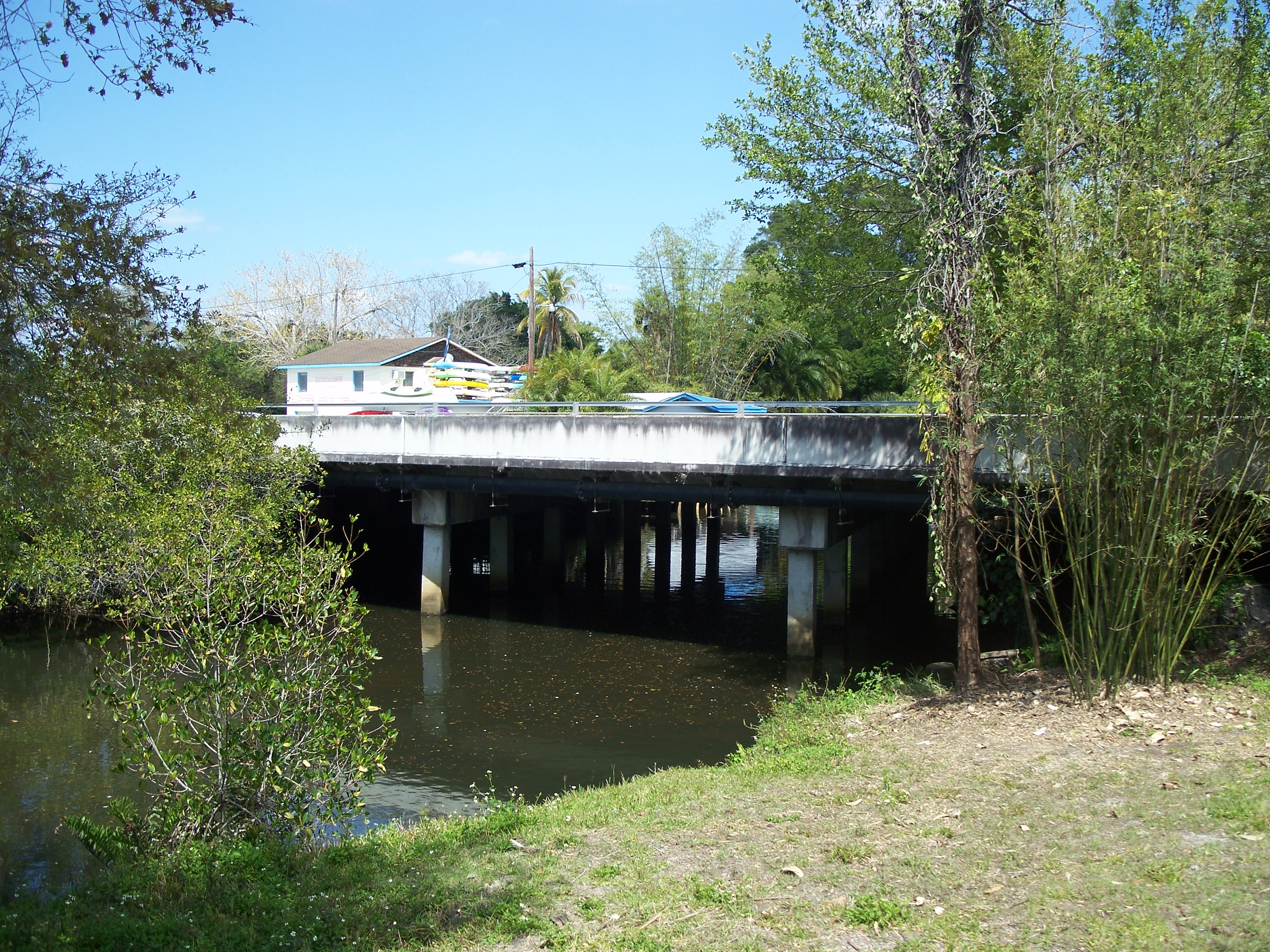

Location
- Country: United States

Physical characteristics
- Mouth
  - location: Estero Bay
- Basin size: Estero Bay

The Estero River is a 6.4-mile-long (10.3 km) waterway in south Lee County, Florida, United States, near the village of Estero. It flows from east to west, emptying into Estero Bay, an inlet of the Gulf of Mexico.

== Topography ==
Access to the river can be gained at 26.43°N 81.81°W.

The river is bounded on the west by Estero Bay. The eastern boundary is three miles east of I-75. The northern and southern river banks are surrounded by developing housing communities towards the eastern part of the river, with greater biodiversity along the western banks.

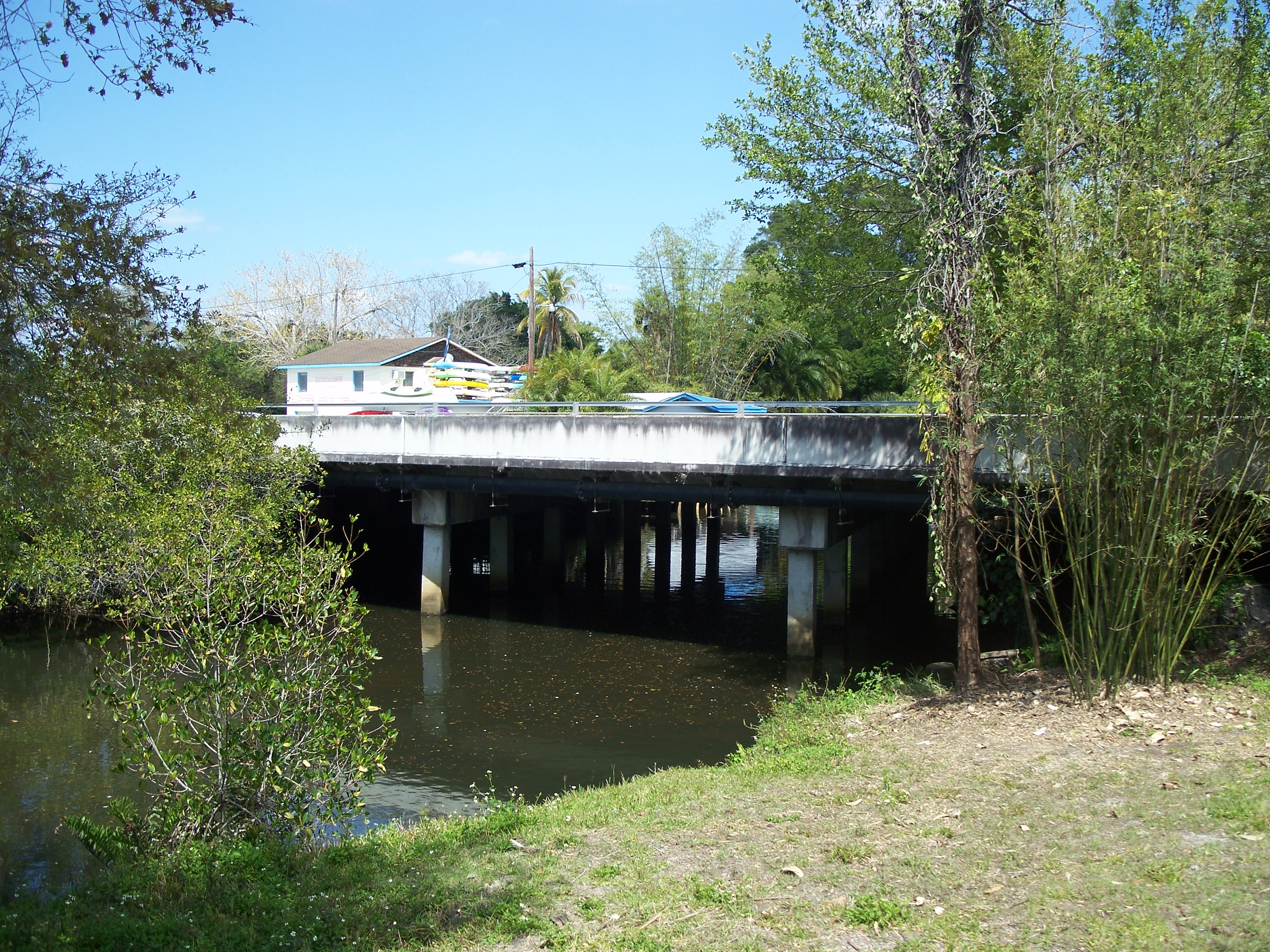
Bridge over the Estero River

== Description ==
The Estero River, in Southwest Florida, is 6.52 miles long. It flows west and spills into Estero Bay estuary. The Estero River has abundant wildlife and is an important habitat for endangered species such as the American alligator (Alligator mississippiensis), Key Largo woodrat (Neotoma floridana smalli), gray bat (Myotis grisescens), and the whooping crane (Grus americana) among others.

=== Wildlife ===
The mangroves on the banks of Estero River support a variety of wildlife and play a vital role in supporting the large biodiversity of the river. The majority of mangroves can be found at where the Estero River merges into Estero Bay.

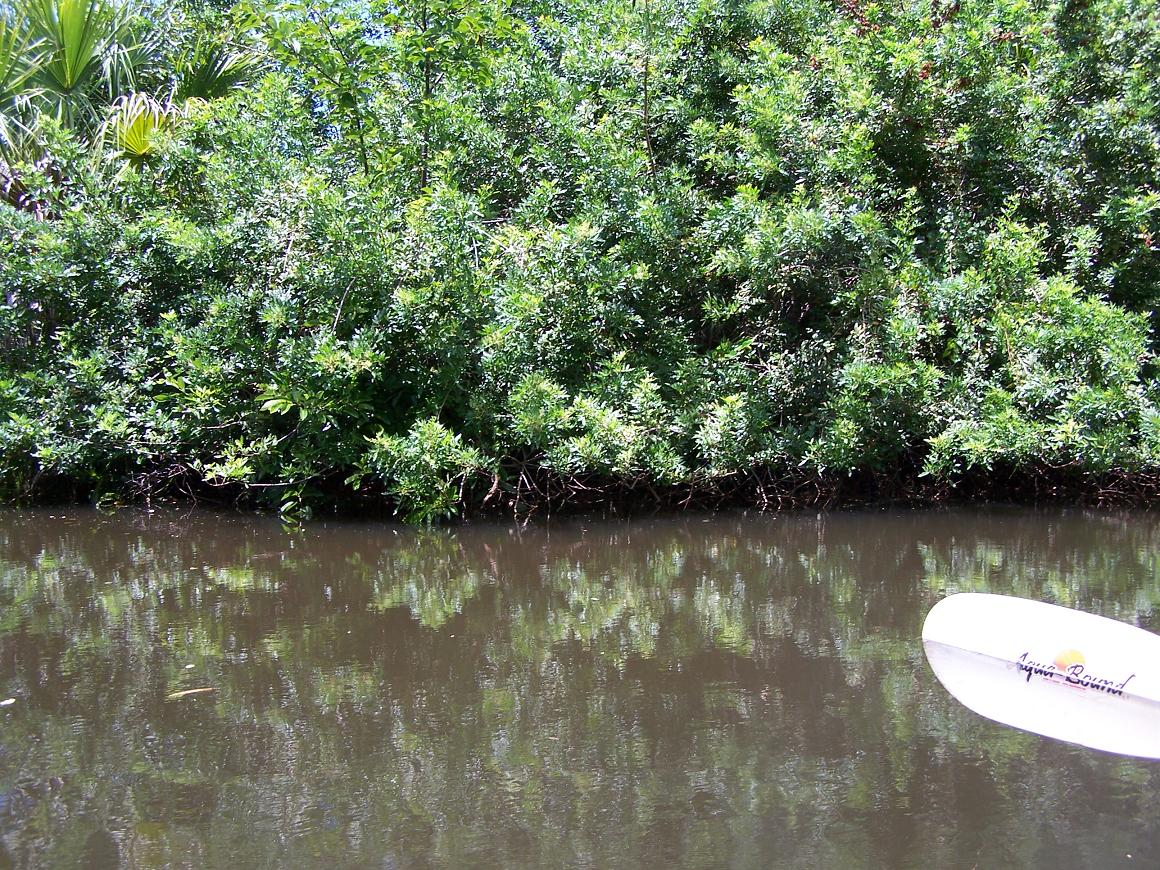
Estero River plant life

The great blue heron (Ardea herodias) inhabits and breeds in both salt and fresh water habitats, making the Estero River perfect for this heron. It nests from "5 to 20 m above ground", and the trees surrounding the river make for a great nesting habitat. These herons feed mostly on aquatic and terrestrial insects that can be found along the river. The great egret (Ardea alba) does not directly compete with the great blue heron; instead it consumes small mammals, amphibians, and sometimes insects.

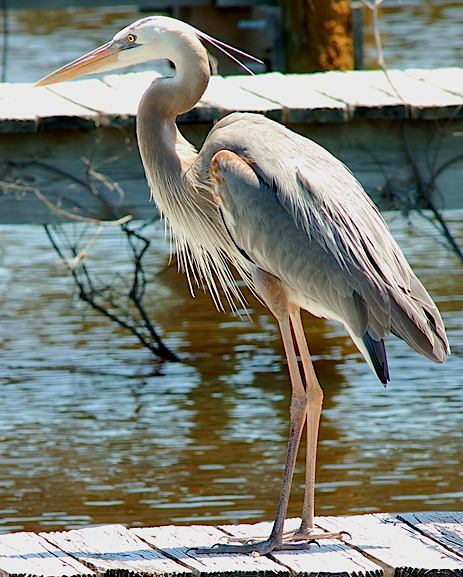
Great blue heron

The tricolored heron (Egretta tricolor) is similar in diet and habitat to the great egret and can be spotted at the Estero River and estuary in the early morning. This heron nests closer to the ground and can coexist with the great blue heron. Its diet consists of insects and small amphibians. American alligators (Alligator mississippiensis) can be found along the Estero River, though the numbers are relatively small. This animal plays a crucial role in maintaining the biodiversity of the river by keeping the raccoon population in balance. Reported sightings happen along the western part of the river with isolated sightings in the eastern region. Their diet consists of small mammals, birds, and larger amphibians.

Raccoons (Procyon lotor) are one of the most common nocturnal mammals inhabiting the area. Their diet is omnivorous, consisting of berries, plants, smaller vertebrates, and invertebrates. It is not uncommon to see one during the day. This mammal has grown used to human presence.

The Estero River is a rich habitat for insects. An abundance of mosquito species can be found near the river, which is a perfect habitat for them. Females consume blood for the vital proteins required for egg development. Both males and females are pollinators and consume plant nectar for sustenance. The orb-weaver spider is found in abundance along the river banks. This spider is easily identified by the shape of its web. It eats small insects. Also bees can be found nesting on overhanging trees.

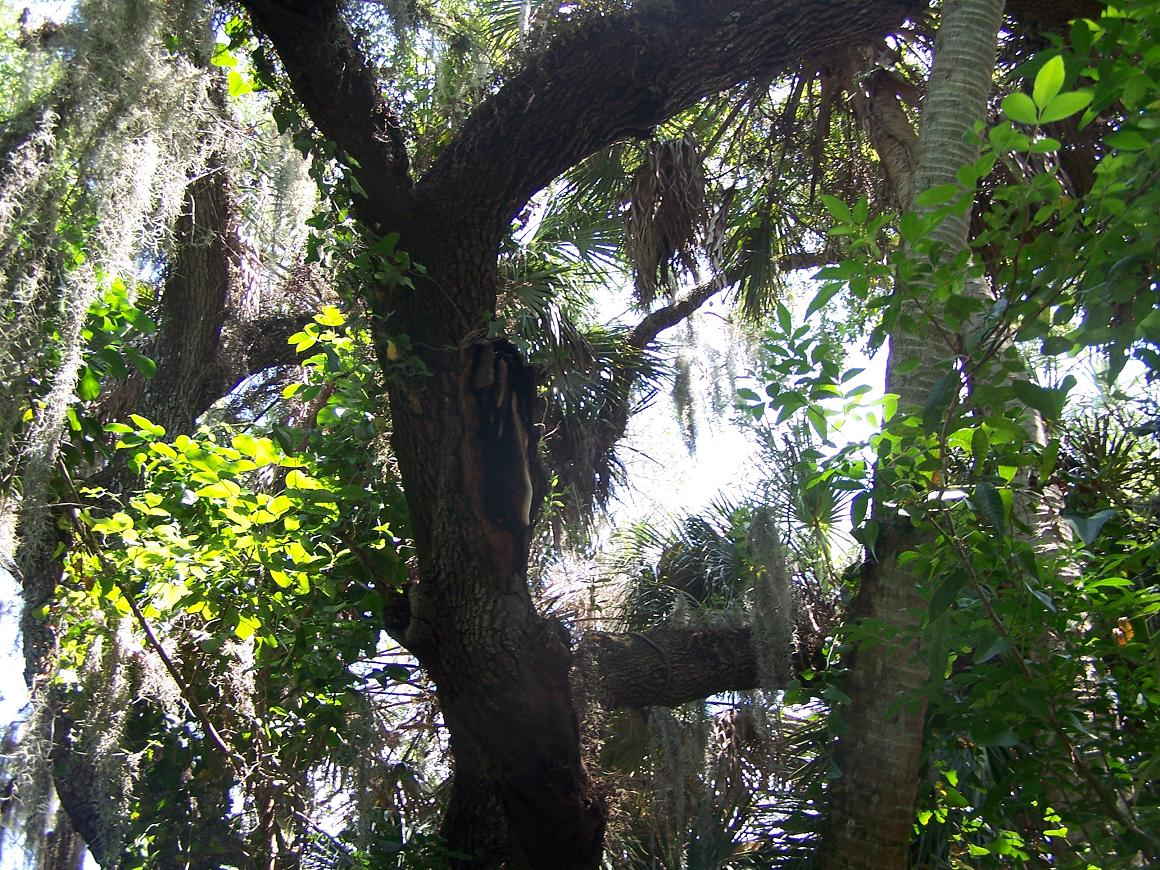
A beehive hanging from a tree. It is near the two-mile marker from the eastern river point.

=== Human impact on the ecosystem ===
The water quality in the eastern part of the river is lower compared to the western part; this is attributed to the increasing human development in the Estero area and the subsequent waste.

The water quality increases dramatically with the distance from the drainage outlets and surrounding houses. Since the majority of development occurs on the banks of the eastern parts of the river the water quality decreases inland.

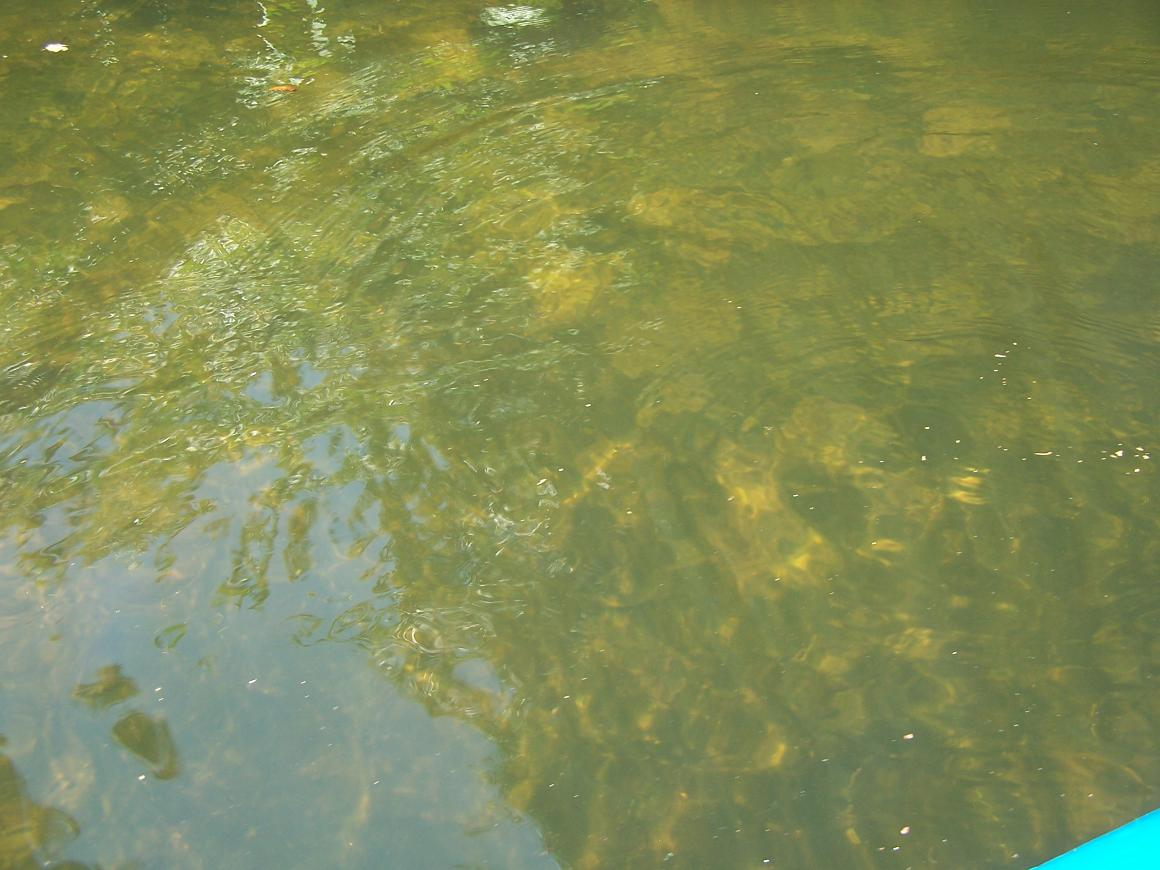
Estero River water quality

== History ==
The first inhabitants known to occupy the Estero River were the Calusa Indians around 7000 years ago. They used the river for transportation and food; they were heavily dependent on fishing. Even though they lived on the Estero, much of their history is located around the Caloosahatchee River, where they first encountered European settlers. Artifacts are still being discovered in the area.

The Calusa's first contact with Europeans was with Spaniard, Juan Ponce de León around 1513. After that they began to diminish. Even though they used the Estero River they also stayed centrally around the Caloosahatchee River, which was a much more sophisticated and reliable river.

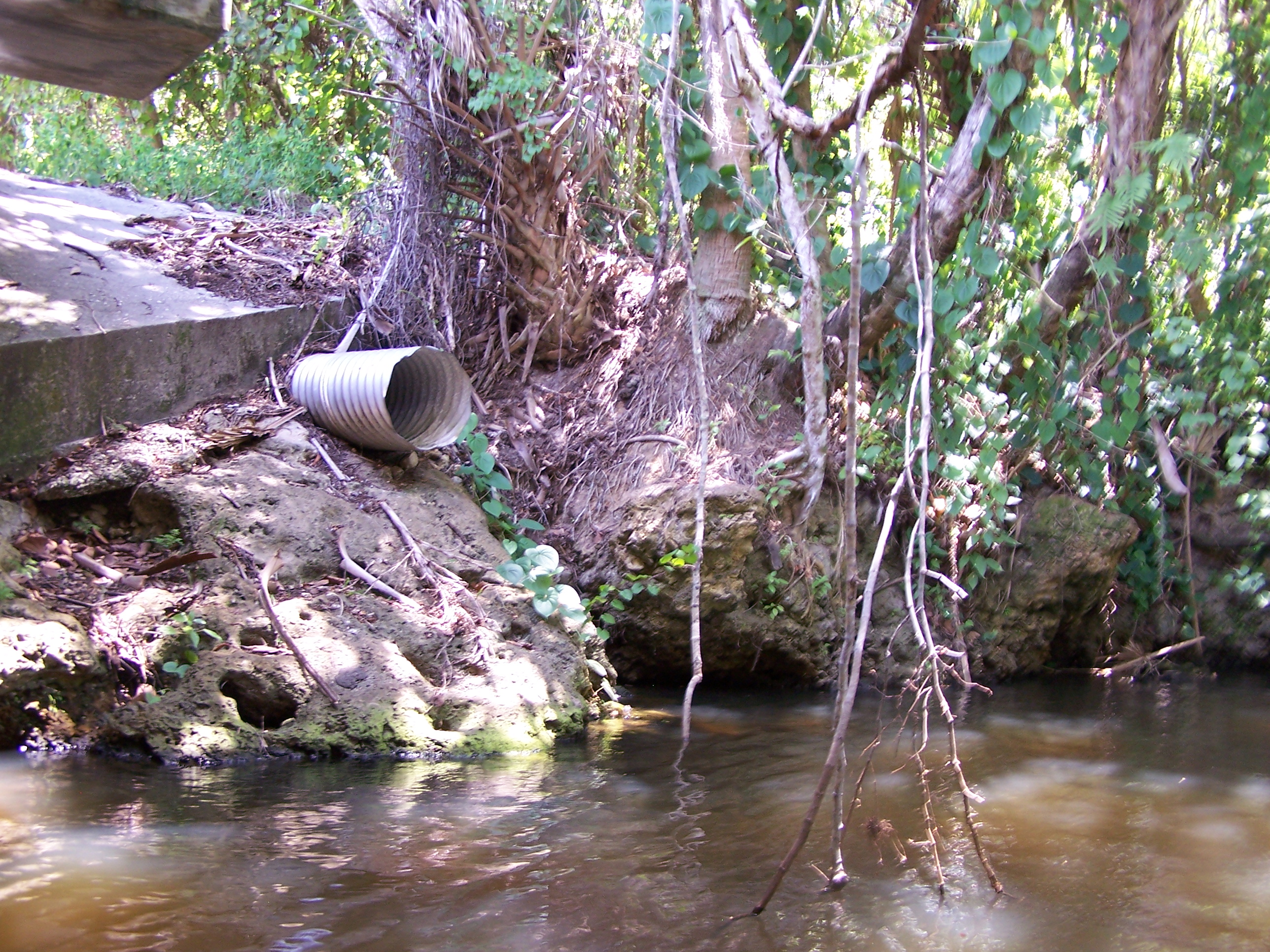
Drainage into the Estero River

The river's recorded history started with Gustave Damkohler, who found the river in 1882 and lived alongside it in a small shack with his family. In 1894 traveled to his hometown in Chicago, Illinois where he met Cyrus Teed, the leader of Koreshanity (a new religious movement). Damkohler offered Teed 300 acres of the land in Estero, including access to the river. Cyrus and a small group of followers moved to Florida, arrived at Estero Bay, and made their way up the Estero River to what is now the Koreshan State Park. They gradually started to build a community and called more and more believers to come down from Chicago. The Koreshans had a major ecological impact on the river when they were living there. They traveled it every day, going in and out of Estero Bay. They hunted and gathered foods from Mound Key, an island just west of the Estero River inlet and used canoes, which were the fastest way of traveling at the time. They also fished the river. The Koreshans believed the earth was like a cell, and they were living on the inside looking at the center of the cell as the atmosphere of the earth. They lived in Estero alongside the river until 1961 when their land was given over to the state of Florida. The Koreshan cult, being believers in immortality and celibacy, had been in decline since 1908 when Cyrus Teed died. All that exists of the Koreshans is the state historic site where people may visit the land and observe the history of the Koreshan people. Canoeing, kayaking, boating, and fishing are still available at the local dock of the Estero River Outfitter store.

The Estero River has an ongoing connection to the history of Florida. During modern times, new developments have been built by the river and it has become more of a landmark than it was in the past. The river is still accessible from about 6.4 miles inland to the outlet at the Estero Bay. Many boaters who live on the river visit the island of Mound Key and do a little exploring as the Calusa did. The river is now used for mainly sport fishing and sightseeing. Although the river was hit hard by hurricanes Wilma and Charley in the past couple of years it has been available to boating.

== See also ==
- List of Florida rivers
