= Lakeland—Fort Myers Line =

Atlantic Coast Line Railroad line in Florida

Overview
- Other name: Fort Myers Subdivision
- Status: Some segments are still operating
- Owner: Atlantic Coast Line Railroad (1902–1967); Seaboard Coast Line Railroad (1967–1986)
- Locale: Southwest Florida
- Continues as: Fort Myers Southern Branch

Technical
- Track gauge: 1,435 mm (4 ft 8 1/2 in) standard gauge
- Electrification: No
- Signalling: None
Route map
Lakeland—Fort Myers Line (red),
the Fort Myers Southern Branch (dark red), and the 1944 realignment of the Fort Myers Southern Branch to Downtown Naples (blue). Click to enlarge.

The Atlantic Coast Line Railroad's Lakeland—Fort Myers Line was one of the railroad company's secondary main lines in Central and Southwest Florida. It was built incrementally between its namesake cities in the late 1800s and early 1900s. The line was extended south of Fort Myers to Naples and beyond in the 1920s, which was designated as a branch line known as the Fort Myers Southern Branch. Parts of the line are still active today.

== Route description ==
The Lakeland—Fort Myers Line began at the Atlantic Coast Line's Main Line just east of downtown Lakeland. From there, it ran southeast to Bartow. After running though central Bartow, it continued south through Fort Meade, Bowling Green, Wauchula, and Zolfo Springs. At a point near Gardner, it turned southwest and went through Arcadia to Punta Gorda on the Gulf Coast. From Punta Gorda, it continued south along the coast to Fort Myers.

From Fort Myers, the Fort Myers Southern Branch continued the line south to Estero, Bonita Springs and Naples. The Fort Myers Southern Branch extended as far south as Marco Island at its greatest extent.

== History ==
=== Lakeland to Charlotte Harbor ===
The northernmost 14 miles of the line from Lakeland to Bartow were built by the South Florida Railroad in September 1884. It was the southern leg of the South Florida Railroad's Pemberton Ferry Branch (the northern leg of the branch north of the main line would be part of the High Springs–Lakeland Line). South of Bartow, the line was originally the Florida Southern Railway's Charlotte Harbor Division. Both the South Florida Railroad and the Florida Southern Railway eventually became part of Henry B. Plant's system of railroads. Surveying work to determine the route for the Charlotte Harbor Division was accomplished by Punta Gorda civil engineer Albert W. Gilchrist, who would later serve as Florida's 20th governor.

The Florida Southern's Charlotte Harbor Division was completed with its first train to its terminus in Punta Gorda (initially known as Trabue) on July 24, 1886. Plant would go on to open a hotel in Punta Gorda in 1896. This hotel, the Hotel Punta Gorda, would later be owned by Barron Collier (the namesake of nearby Collier County).

=== Extension to Fort Myers and improvements ===
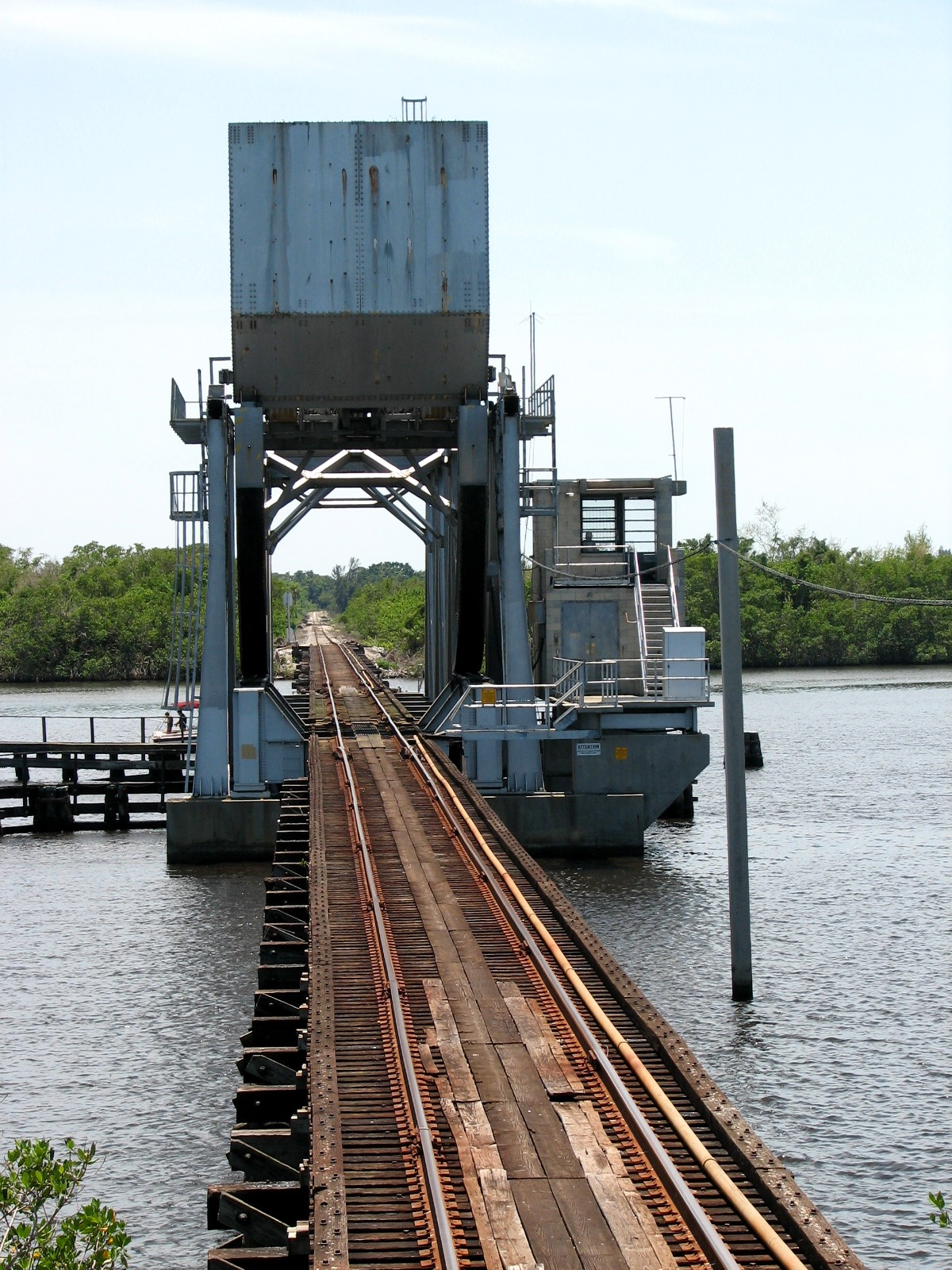
Caloosahatchee River trestle. Bridge was built in 1904 with the bascule span replacing the original swing span in 1977.

Charlotte Harbor was Henry Plant's ultimate goal for his railroad system in Florida. Despite owning a hotel in Fort Myers, he had no interest in having the line continue beyond Punta Gorda. Fort Myers was seeking railroad service at the time and had already been established as a city unlike Punta Gorda. After Plant's death in 1899, his heirs would sell his entire system of railroads to the Atlantic Coast Line Railroad in 1902 and serving Fort Myers quickly became a top priority for Atlantic Coast Line president Henry Walters.

Construction commenced promptly on an extension to Fort Myers via Tice, which made it the Atlantic Coast Line's first expansion of the former Plant System. The alignment through Tice was selected so the line would cross the wide Caloosahatchee River farther upstream at Beautiful Island, where a series of shorter trestles could be built. The northernmost trestle originally had a steel swing span built by the American Bridge Company to accommodate river traffic. Service up to the Caloosahatchee River commenced in 1903. After the completion of the trestles over the river, regular train service to Fort Myers commenced on May 10, 1904. The line originally ran west into Downtown Fort Myers along Peck Street (known today as Widman Way) where a yard was located. Just beyond the yard, track ran northwest along Monroe Street. The original Fort Myers passenger depot was located on the southwest corner of Main Street and Monroe Street. By June of 1904, track continued north along Monroe Street to a wharf on the Caloosahatchee River waterfront. Fort Myers would remain the southernmost point of the entire Atlantic Coast Line Railroad system until the Florida land boom of the 1920s.

In the 1910s, the Atlantic Coast Line replaced some of the line's original passenger depots further north with new brick structures in Fort Meade, Wauchula, and Arcadia. In 1924, the Atlantic Coast Line built a new Spanish mission-style passenger depot in Fort Myers at Jackson Street and Peck Street, replacing the original depot on Monroe Street. Passenger depots were also replaced with new brick depots in Bowling Green in 1925 and Zolfo Springs in 1927.

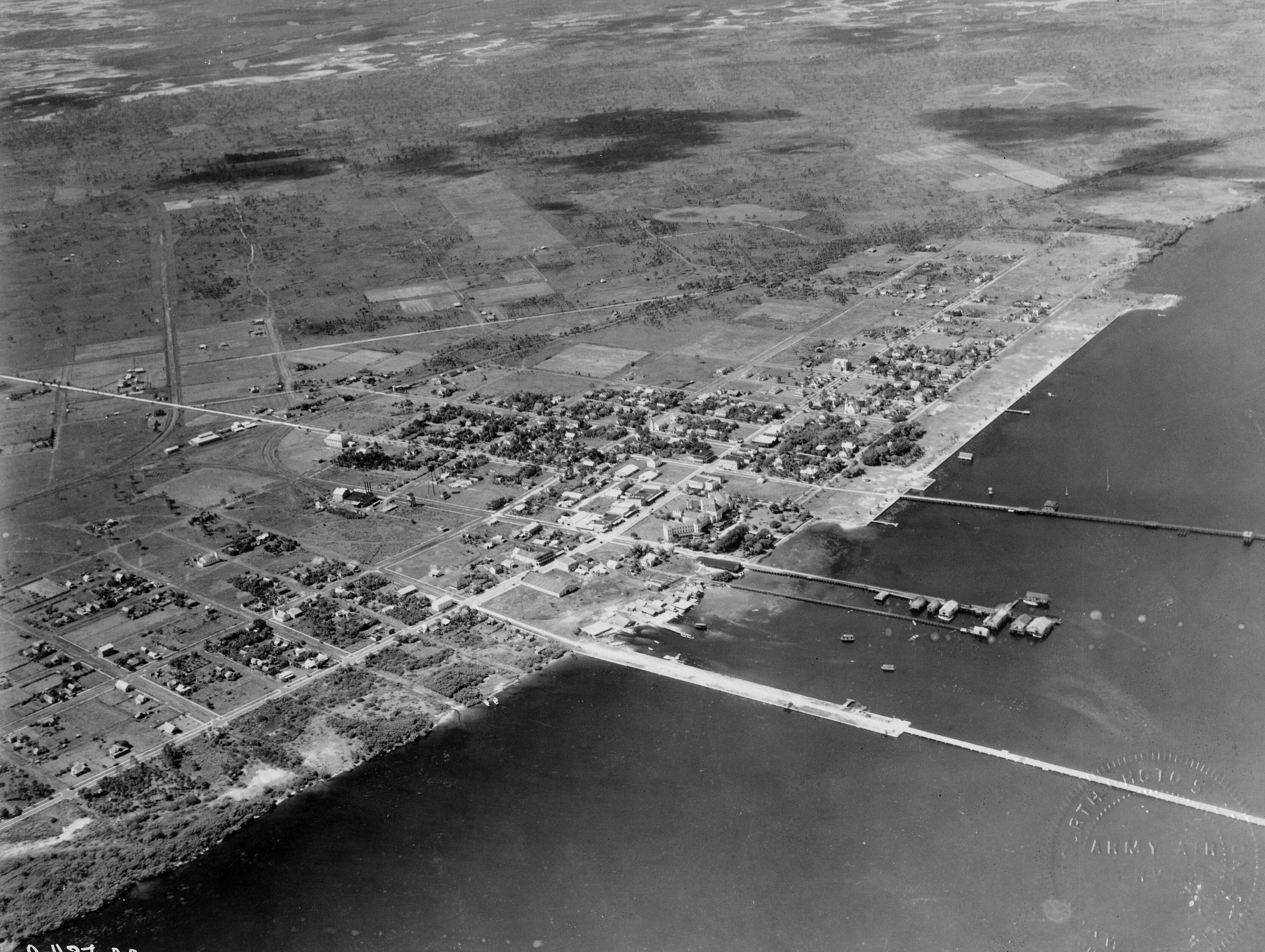
Overhead view of Punta Gorda in 1924 showing much of the railroad infrastructure at the time

A new brick depot was also built in Punta Gorda on Taylor Road in 1928. This depot replaced the previous depot built in 1897 that was located on King Street (present-day US 41 northbound) on a spur. The depot and dock at the end of King Street were then demolished to allow for the construction of the original Barron Collier Bridge. Track on the spur in Punta Gorda was then extended west over a previous alignment to serve a new city dock at Maud Street.

=== Fort Myers Southern Branch ===
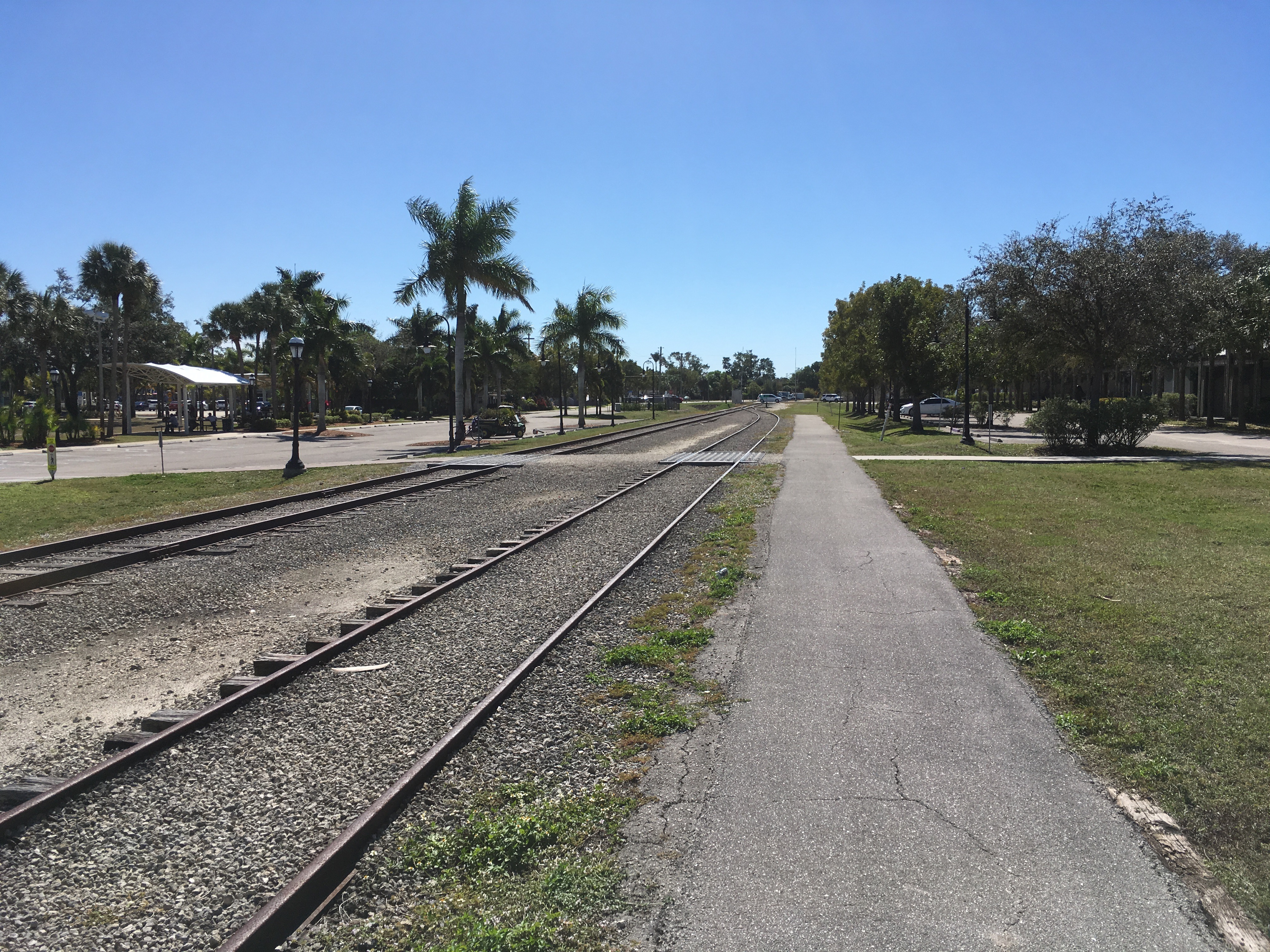
Track in downtown Bonita Springs as seen in 2019

Once the Florida land boom was underway in the early 1920s, the Atlantic Coast Line partnered with a number of local businessmen including advertising entrepreneur Barron Collier, who owned large amounts of land in the newly created Collier County. Through this partnership, they acquired the dormant charter of the unbuilt Fort Myers Southern Railroad (which was chartered in 1918 by the Fort Myers Southern Railroad Company) and used it to extend the line from Fort Myers further south to Collier County. The Atlantic Coast Line would designate track south of Fort Myers as the Fort Myers Southern Branch, referencing the line's charter. Tracks reached Bonita Springs in June of 1925 with regular passenger service commencing on September 7, 1925 to a depot just south of the Imperial River.

The following year, the line was further extended to Naples with passenger service beginning on December 27, 1926. The extension ran just east of Naples, with the original Naples depot located on the present northeast corner of Airport Road and Radio Road (near Naples Airport). The line was built on the east side of town because the Atlantic Coast Line's competitor, the Seaboard Air Line Railroad, was building a parallel line from Fort Ogden to Fort Myers and Naples. The Seaboard Air Line quietly managed to secure a more ideal right of way to downtown Naples. Seaboard's service to Naples would commence eleven days after the Atlantic Coast Line.

The Fort Myers Southern Branch was extended one last time from Naples to Collier City on Marco Island in mid 1927. The line would remain the as the Atlantic Coast Line's southernmost track until 1928, when their parallel Haines City Branch was extended to Everglades City.

By the end of 1927, the Atlantic Coast Line was running regular passenger train service to Naples. Trains terminating in Naples were turned around at a turning wye in Bonita Springs and backed down to the original Naples depot since there was no wye there. Additionally, two daily passenger trains from Tampa were also running the line to Naples by 1927. These trains ran on the Atlantic Coast Line's subsidiary, the Tampa Southern Railroad, which had been extended from Sarasota to connect with the Lakeland—Fort Myers Line in Southfort (near Fort Ogden) in 1927. Service from Tampa via Sarasota was short-lived and the connection to Sarasota was abandoned by 1949. Service to Marco Island was provided by a mixed train from Fort Myers and Naples. The Doxsee Clam Factory was the railroad's main freight customer on Marco Island. A wye was also built on Marco Island.

==== Naples relocation ====
By 1940, regularly scheduled train service to Marco Island had ceased. The Doxsee Clam Factory relocated from Marco Island to Naples in 1943, which ended rail service to Marco Island all together.

The Seaboard Air Line Railroad abandoned their parallel line to Naples in 1942. With the abandonment of the Seaboard's line and the decline of service to Marco Island, the Atlantic Coast Line took advantage of an opportunity to relocate their Naples service to a more ideal location. In 1944, the Atlantic Coast Line connected the Fort Myers Southern Branch to the Seaboard's former right of way near Vanderbilt Beach and then effectively rebuilt track from there down the Seaboard's route (along present-day Goodlette-Frank Road) to Downtown Naples. They also acquired the Seaboard's passenger Naples depot on Fifth Avenue South and related facilities.

Upon completion at the end of 1944, the Atlantic Coast Line relocated all Naples service to the former Seaboard depot. The original Naples depot on Airport Road was closed and the line's original alignment from Vanderbilt Beach to Marco Island was then abandoned. The original Atlantic Coast Line depot was repurposed but was later demolished in 1981.

=== Later years ===
The Atlantic Coast Line's Gulf Coast Special and West Coast Champion were notable passenger services to operate on the line to Naples. In the 1940s, many passenger trains originated at Lake Alfred and ran down the Bartow Branch to Bartow before continuing to Fort Myers and Naples. At the time, the Atlantic Coast Line operated a daily local passenger train and a daily freight train along the line from Bartow to Fort Myers. The Atlantic Coast Line operated mixed train service from Fort Myers to Naples six days a week.

In the 1950s and 1960s, the Atlantic Coast Line ran a daily passenger train between Lakeland and Naples via Fort Myers, with through cars from New York coming off the Tampa-bound section of the West Coast Champion at Lakeland. In the Spring 1967 timetable, southbound train #291 left Lakeland at 3:05 pm, arriving at Punta Gorda 4:55 pm, Fort Myers at 5:40 pm, and Naples at 6:50 pm.

By 1944, track to the Caloosahatchee River wharf in Fort Myers had been removed. The Atlantic Coast Line relocated its freight yard from Downtown Fort Myers to its current location south of Hanson Street in 1960.

=== Mergers and consolidation ===
The Atlantic Coast Line became the Seaboard Coast Line Railroad after merging with the Seaboard Air Line Railroad in 1967 (which ironically brought the Seaboard brand back to the Naples depot it had abandoned back in 1942). The Seaboard Coast Line adopted the Seaboard Air Line's method of naming their lines as subdivisions which resulted in the full line from Lakeland to Naples being designated the Fort Myers Subdivision (a name which the Seaboard Air Line had previously used on their own line to Fort Myers which was fully abandoned by 1952). The Seaboard Coast Line briefly continued to operate a daily passenger train and a local freight train six days a week between Lakeland and Naples. However, intercity passenger service on the line was discontinued in 1971 upon the creation of Amtrak, who opted not to serve Southwest Florida. Track within Downtown Fort Myers near the depot would eventually be removed.

In 1977, the swing bridge over the Caloosahatchee River in Tice was replaced by the current bascule bridge.

In early 1980, the Seaboard Coast Line abandoned the southernmost 10 miles of the line from the Naples depot up to Wiggins Pass Road in North Naples. The abandoned right of way was then sold to Collier County, who subsequently used it to widen and extend Goodlette-Frank Road. The area around the line's new terminus in North Naples was subsequently developed into the Rail Head Industrial Park.

In 1980, the Seaboard Coast Line's parent company merged with the Chessie System, creating the CSX Corporation. The CSX Corporation initially operated the Chessie and Seaboard Systems separately until 1986, when they were merged into CSX Transportation. During the transition into CSX, the company sought to abandon many redundant routes and sell others to shortline railroads. As a result, the line was abandoned between Bowling Green and Arcadia in 1984. Track was also abandoned between Bartow and Homeland around the same time. The remaining track south of Arcadia, which was sold to the shortline Seminole Gulf Railway in 1987, is still connected to the rest of the CSX network via the former Charlotte Harbor and Northern Railway.

Track from Eaton Park (just south of Lakeland) to Bartow was abandoned in the early 2000s.

== Current conditions ==
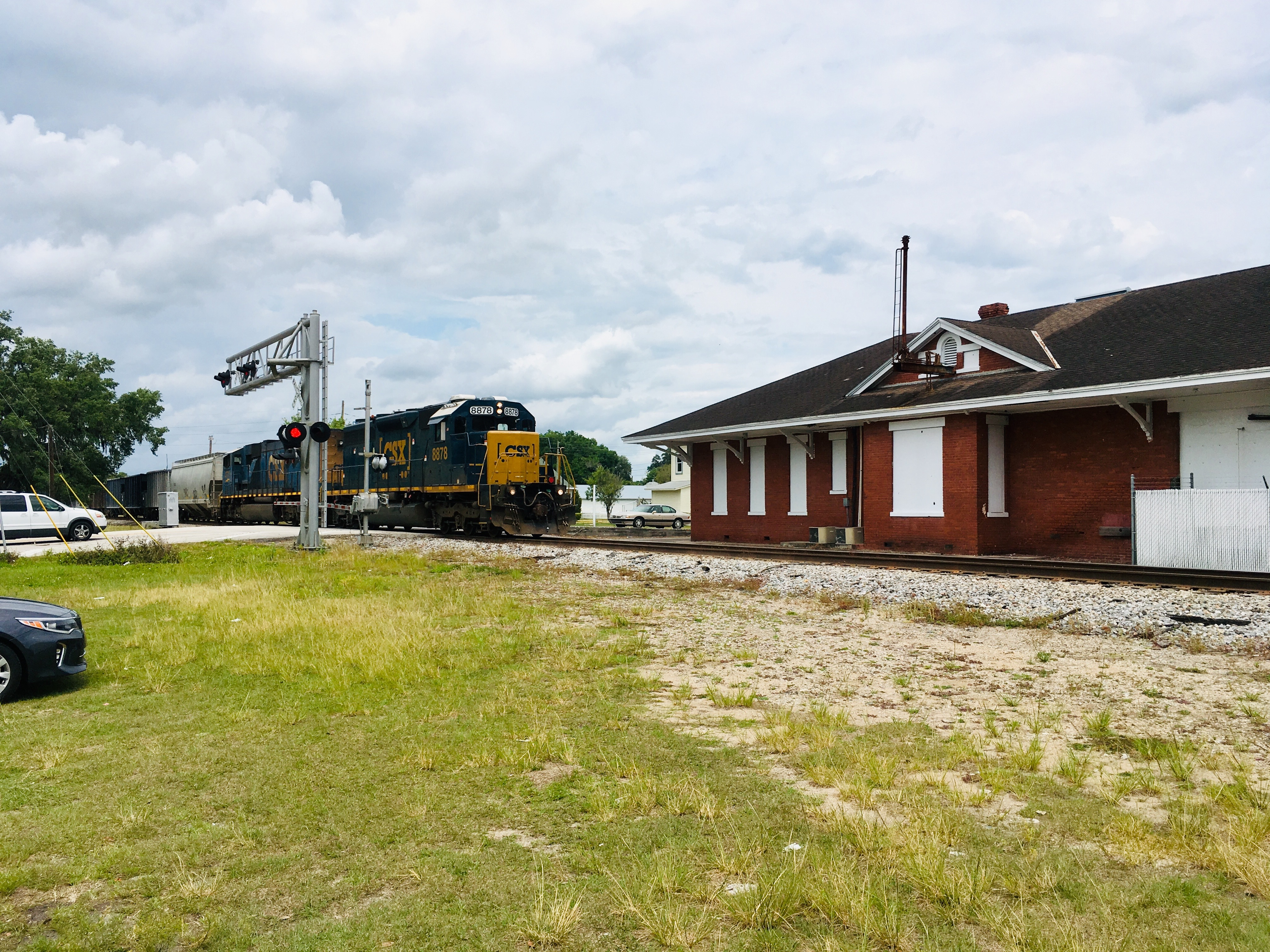
Empty CSX phosphate train passing the Fort Meade Depot in 2019

Today, the former Lakeland—Fort Myers Line remains in three discontinuous sections.

At the north end, the line is still in service from Lakeland to Eaton Park. This segment is now CSX's CH Spur. The former right of way between Eaton Park and Bartow is now the Fort Fraser Trail.

From Homeland to Bowling Green, the line is still in service and it is now the southeastern end of CSX's Valrico Subdivision. This segment of the line still carries large amounts of phosphate from The Mosaic Company's South Fort Meade mine. Track from the entrance to the mine south to Bowling Green (at a point just 100 yards north of the Bowling Green depot) is still in place but is out of service. Much of U.S. Route 17 has been widened into the former right of way between Bowling Green and Arcadia.

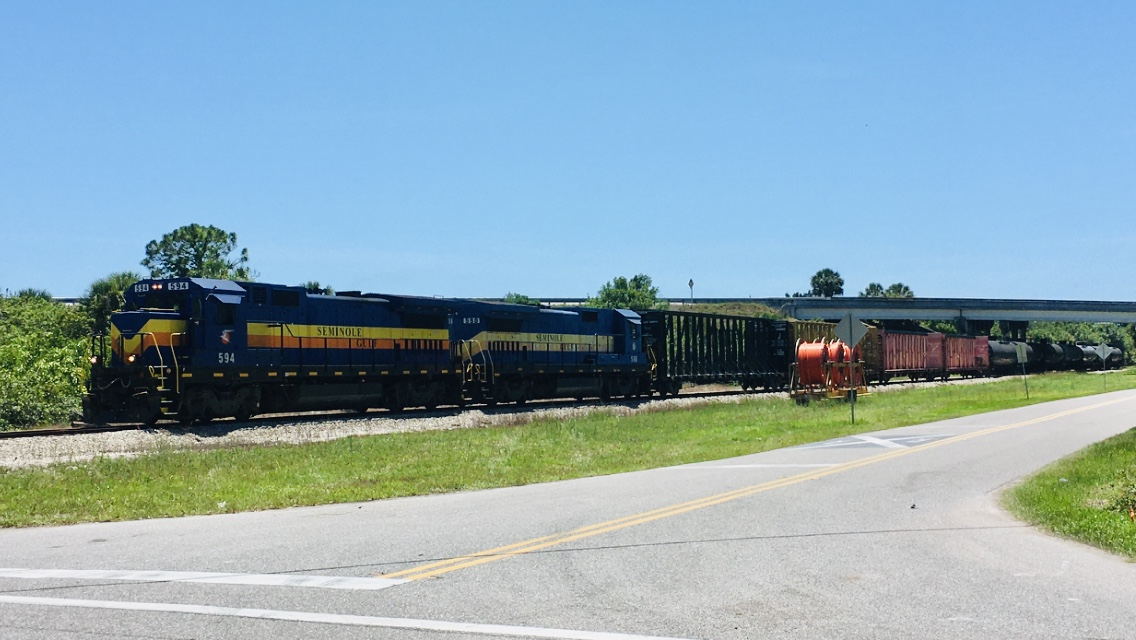
Seminole Gulf Railway's Desoto Turn on the line near Punta Gorda

The most substantial segment of the line that still remains is from Arcadia to North Naples. This segment has been operated by Seminole Gulf Railway since 1987, which carries mixed freight to Southwest Florida. However, the southernmost 15 miles of the Seminole Gulf Railway from Alico Road (near San Carlos Park) to North Naples is inactive and has not had any active shippers since around 2008. In February 2024, that segment was subject to a purchase agreement (pending funding) for $81.7 million to be converted into the Bonita Estero Rail Trail. Seminole Gulf rebuilt most of the Atlantic Coast Line-era trestles over the Caloosahatchee River in early 2024 after they were destroyed by Hurricane Ian in 2022.

Further south, Goodlette-Frank Road runs along the post-1944 former right of way from Immokalee Road to Downtown Naples near the Naples depot.

Collier Boulevard (SR 951) runs along the original alignment of the line from its intersection with the Tamiami Trail to Marco Island. Near Marco Island, a small sandbar named "Railroad Islet" and the "Railroad Shoals" mark the former location of the railroad's bridge to the island, which was located just east of the S.S. Jolley Bridge.

Passenger depots built by the Atlantic Coast Line are still standing in Fort Meade, Bowling Green, Wauchula, Arcadia, Punta Gorda, and Fort Myers. The depot in Naples built by the Seaboard Air Line and used by the Atlantic Coast Line after 1944 also still stands which is now the Naples Depot Museum.

The Punta Gorda Linear Park today runs along the line's former spur in Punta Gorda that ran to the old dock at Maud Street (which is now Fishermen's Village).

== Historic stations ==
Lakeland to Collier City
Milepost	City/Location	Station	Image	Connections and notes
AX 851.8	Lakeland	Lakeland		junction with Main Line
AX 855.2	Eaton Park	Eaton Park		
AX 859.0	Highland City	Highland City		originally named Haskell
AX 864.0	Bartow	Bartow		junction with: Bartow Branch; Seaboard Air Line Railroad Valrico Subdivision
AX 864.8		Oaks		
AX 870.2	Homeland	Homeland		
AX 872.5		Pembroke		
AX 875.2	Fort Meade	Fort Meade		junction with Bone Valley Branch replaced original station in 1914
AX 879.4		Tencor		
AX 879.7		Jane Jay		
AX 882.7	Bowling Green	Bowling Green		replaced original station in 1925
AX 884.7		Torrey		
AX 889.3	Wauchula	Wauchula		replaced original station in 1914
AX 893.4	Zolfo Springs	Zolfo Springs		originally Zolfo
AX 896.3	Moffitt	Moffitt		
AX 899.1		Buchanan		
AX 903.8	Gardner	Gardner		
AX 907.1	Brownville	Brownville		
AX 913.2	Arcadia	Arcadia		replaced original station in 1911 junction with: Charlotte Harbor and Northern Railway (SAL); East and West Coast Railway (SAL)
AX 917.2	Nocatee	Nocatee		
AX 923.9	Fort Ogden	Fort Ogden		depot destroyed by Hurricane Charley on August 13, 2004 junction with Seaboard Air Line Railroad Fort Myers Subdivision
AX 925.7	Southfort	Southfort		junction with Tampa Southern Railroad (ACL)
AX 933.5	Cleveland	Cleveland		
AX 937.4	Punta Gorda	Punta Gorda		originally named Trabue
AX 941.3		Acline		
AX 949.3		Gilchrist		junction with Seaboard Air Line Railroad Fort Myers Subdivision
AX 956.0		Slater		
AX 958.2	North Fort Myers	Bayshore		originally named Samville
AX 961.2		Tice		
AX 964.8	Fort Myers	Fort Myers		located on a wye replaced an earlier station on Monroe Street in 1924
AX 971.0		Ali		
AX 975.1		Amonate		
AX 979.6	Estero	Estero		
AX 983.3		Council		
AX 987.4	Bonita Springs	Bonita Springs		
AX 992.3	Vanderbilt	Vanderbilt		
AX 1000.3	Naples	Naples (original station)		station near Naples Airport on original alignment. Abandoned in 1944 and service relocated to Seaboard depot. Station demolished in 1981.
AX 1001.2	Naples	Naples (Fifth Avenue South station)		previously Seaboard Air Line Railroad depot from 1926 to 1942. Atlantic Coast Line took over the station and tracks in 1944.
AX 1008.6		Belle Meade		
AX 1016.5	Marco Island	Collier City		

== See also ==
- Main Line (Atlantic Coast Line Railroad)
- Bartow Branch
- Haines City Branch
