= Peace River (Florida) =

River in the United States of America

Peace River Peas Creek
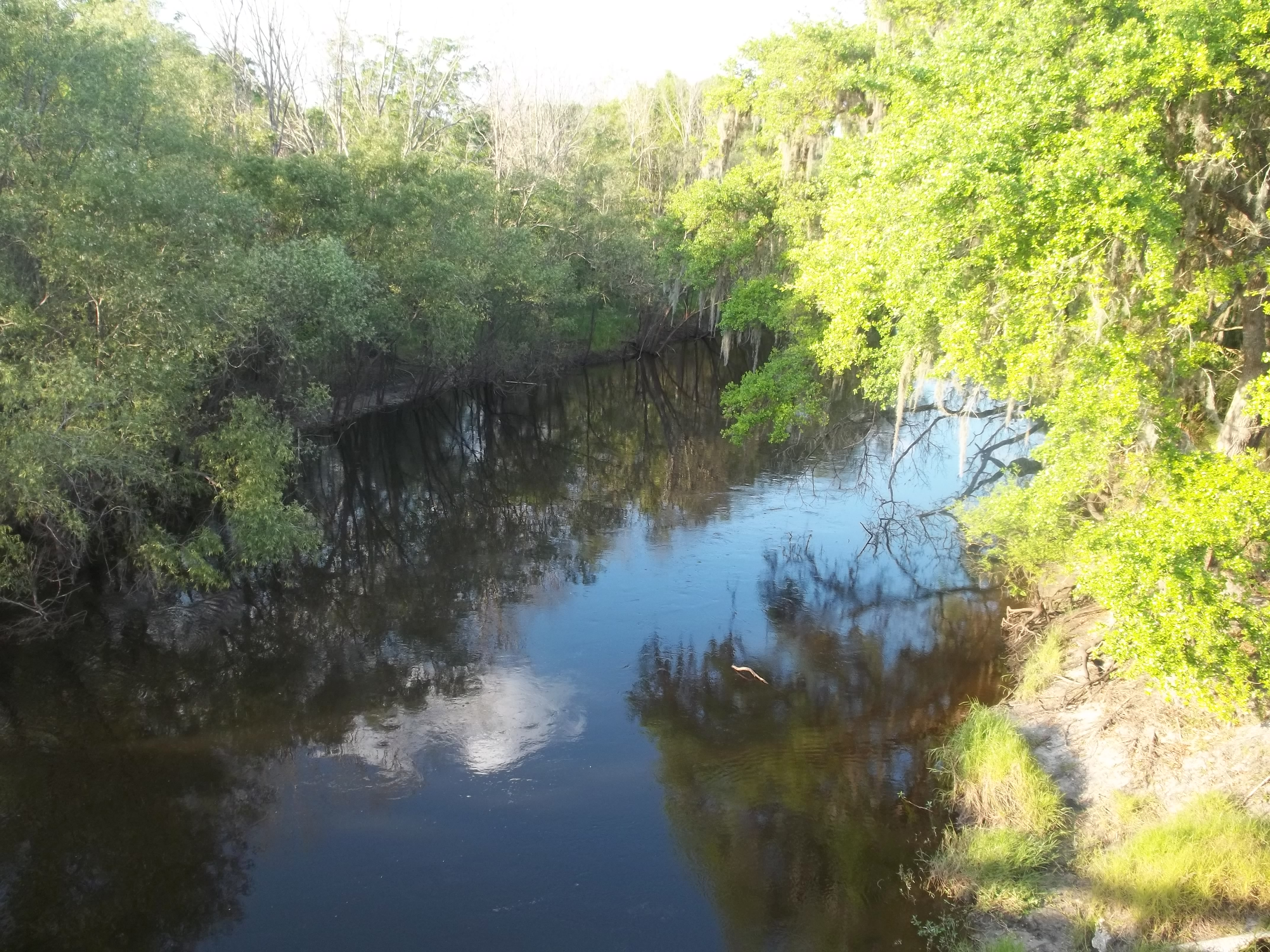
- The Peace River, Taken Around Wauchula, FL.

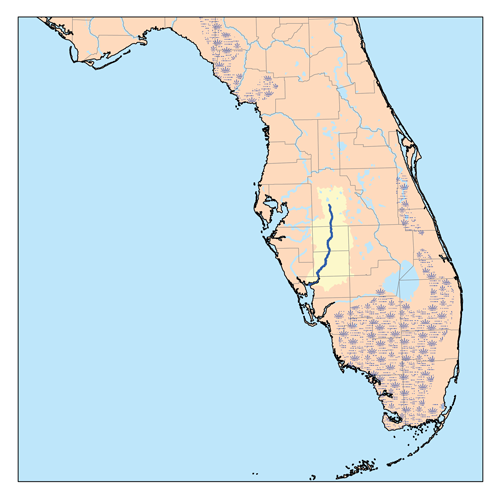
- Peace River River Basin Map
- Native name: Talakchopcohatchee (Creek)

Location
- Country: United States
- State: Florida
- Region: Central Florida; Southwest Florida

Physical characteristics
- Source: near Bartow
- Mouth: Charlotte Harbor

Basin features
- Tributaries
  - left: Bowlegs Creek, Little Charlie Creek, Charlie Creek, Josgua Creek, Prairie Creek, and Shell Creek
  - right: Payne Creek and Horse Creek

The Peace River is a river in the southwestern part of the Florida peninsula, in the U.S.A.

== Name ==
The river was called Rio de la Paz (River of Peace) on 16th century Spanish charts. It appeared as Peas Creek or Pease Creek on later maps. The Creek (and later, Seminole) Indians called it Talakchopcohatchee, "River of Long Peas".

== Course ==
The Peace River originates with the junction of Saddle Creek and the Peace Creek Drainage Canal northeast of Bartow in Polk County. Lower Saddle Creek flows out of the south end Lake Hancock. Upper Saddle Creek flows into the north end of Lake Hancock. The Peace Creek Drainage Canal flows out of the Winter Haven chain of lakes. The river then flows south through Hardee and DeSoto counties, entering the Charlotte Harbor estuary near Punta Gorda in Charlotte County. The cities of Fort Meade, Bowling Green, Wauchula, Zolfo Springs, and Arcadia are adjacent to the river. It is 76 miles (122 km) long and has a drainage basin of 2,300 square miles (6,000 km^{2}).

Saddle Creek and the Peace Creek Drainage Canal originate in the Green Swamp. The watershed includes almost all of DeSoto and Hardee counties, major portions of Charlotte and Polk counties, and small potions of Glades, Highlands, Hillsborough, Manatee, and Sarasota counties. The watershed is low-lying and has numerous wetlands and lakes. Tributaries in addition to Peace Creek and Saddle Creek include Shell Creek, Joshua Creek, Charlie Creek, Little Charlie Creek, Bowlegs Creek, Payne Creek, and Horse Creek.

== History ==
Fresh water from the Peace River is vital to maintain the delicate salinity of Charlotte Harbor that hosts several endangered species, as well as commercial and recreational harvests of shrimp, crabs, and fish. The river has always been a vital resource to the people in its watershed. Historically, the abundant fishery and wildlife of Charlotte Harbor supported large populations of people of the Caloosahatchee culture (in early historic times, the Calusa). Today, the Peace River supplies over six million gallons per day of drinking water to the people in the region. The river is also popular for canoeing.

There were many Pleistocene and Miocene fossils found throughout the Peace River area, eventually leading to the discovery of phosphate deposits. Most of the northern watershed of the Peace River comprises an area known as the Bone Valley.

The Peace River is a popular destination for fossil hunters who dig and sift the river gravel for fossilized shark teeth and prehistoric mammal bones. Several campgrounds and canoe rental operations cater to fossil hunters, with Wauchula, Zolfo Springs, and Arcadia being the main points of entry.

== Gallery ==
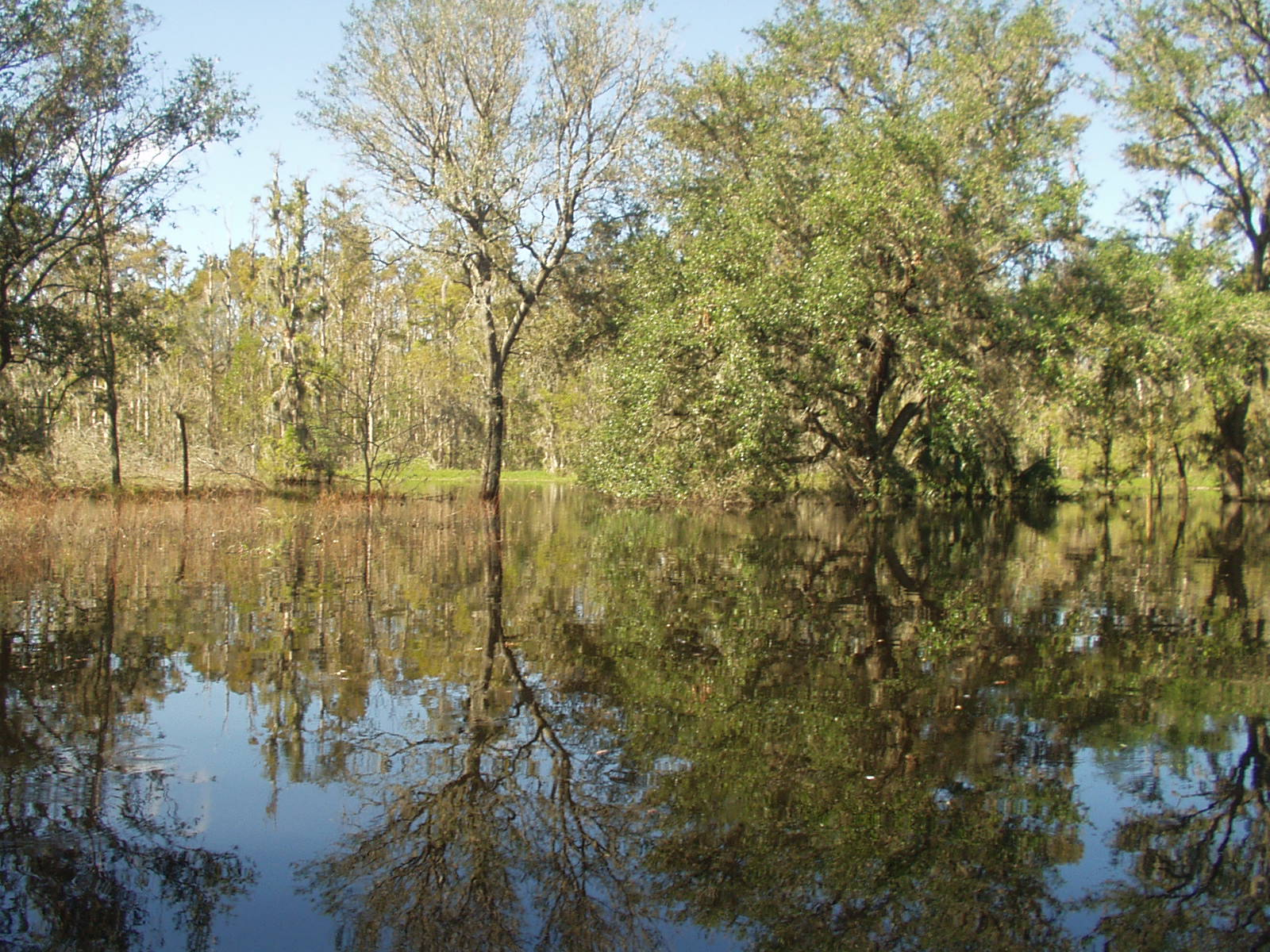
Backflow from Peace River after hurricanes

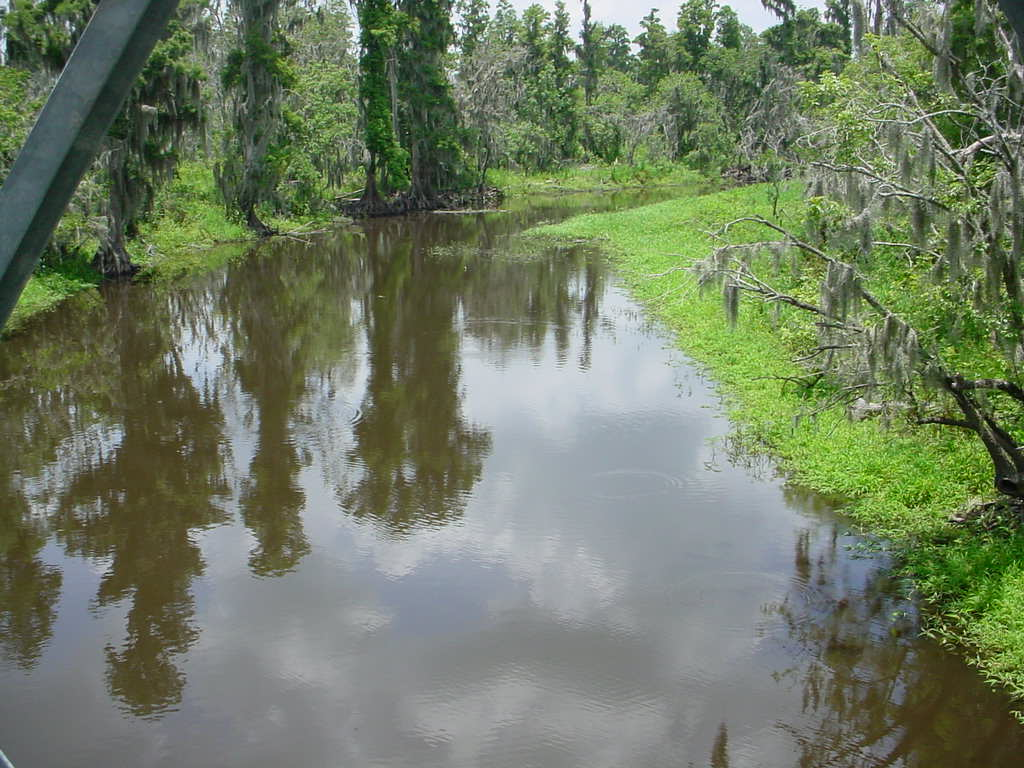
Streamflow changes along upper Peace River

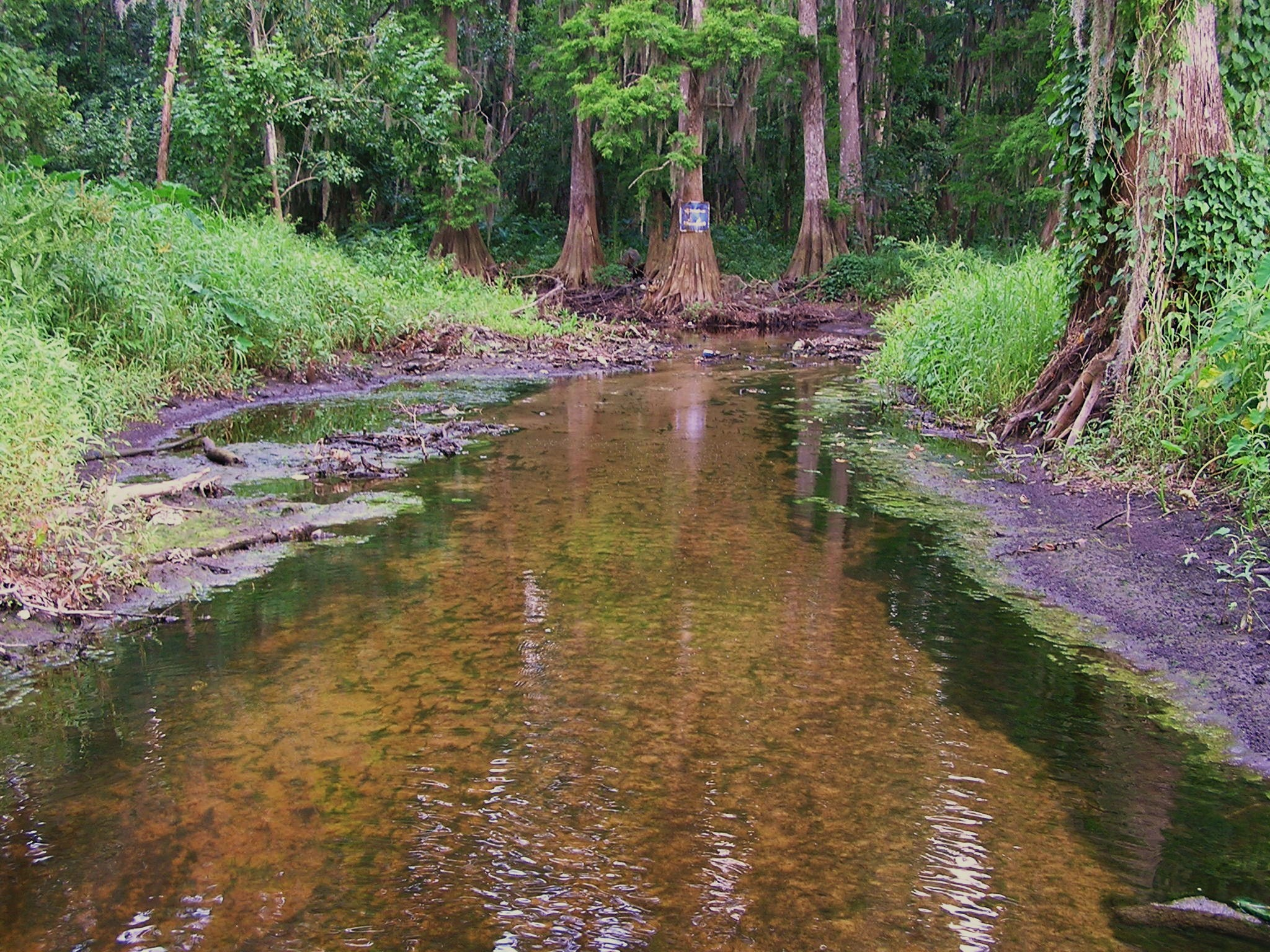
Flow changes along upper Peace River

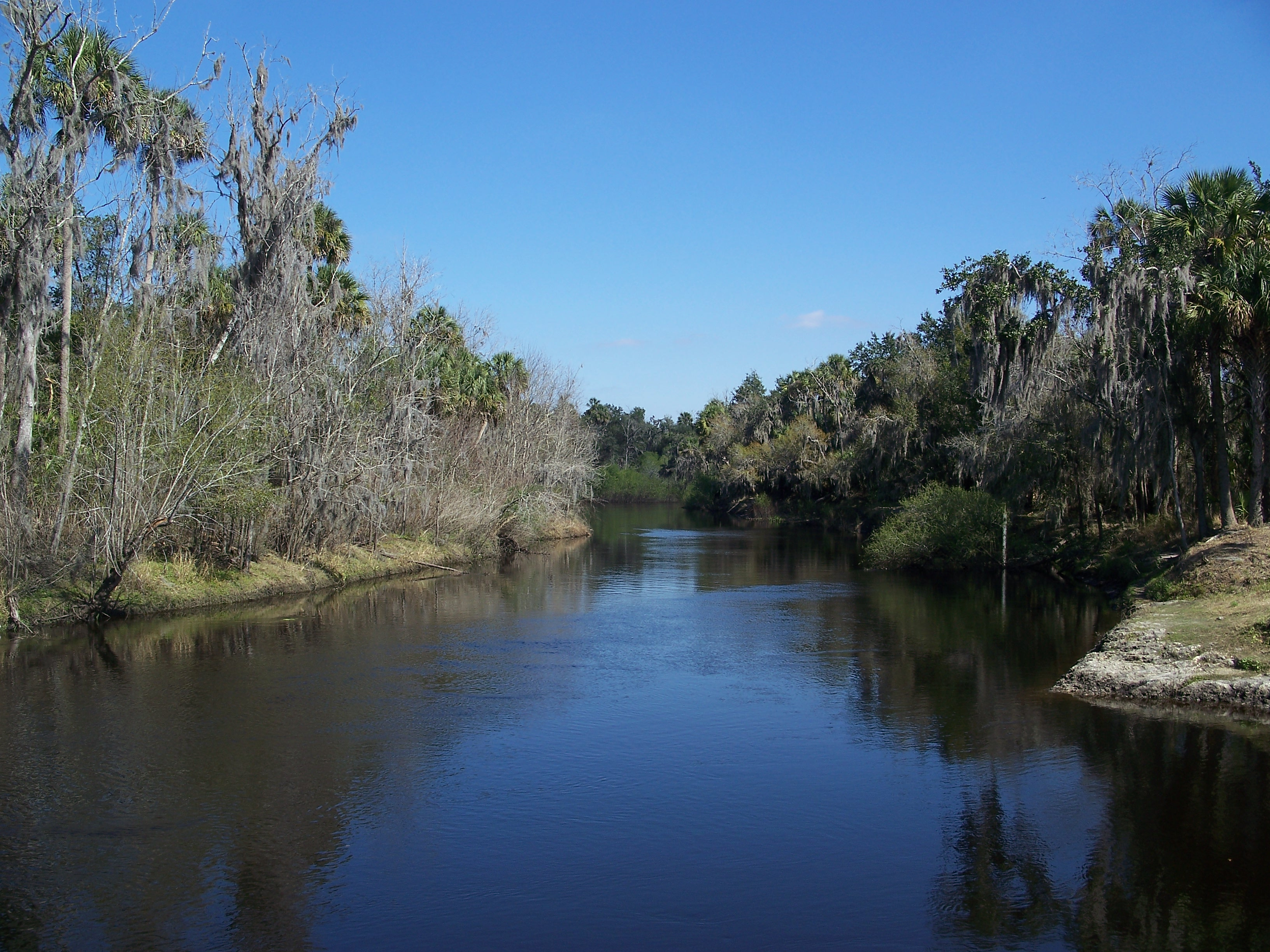
Zolfo Springs on the Peace River

== List of crossings ==
| Crossing | Carries | Image | Location | Coordinates |
|---|---|---|---|---|
| Headwaters (Juncture of Peace Creek and Saddle Creek) | | | | |
| Spessard L Holland Bridge | SR-60 | | Bartow | 27.902242°N 81.817583°W |
| | Homeland Garfield Road | | Homeland | 27.821029°N 81.799746°W |
| John Singletary Bridge | US-98 | | Fort Meade | 27.751658°N 81.781944°W |
| | Mt Pisgah Road | | Fort Meade | 27.722731°N 81.790080°W |
| | Fort Meade Spur | | Bowling Green | 27.656907°N 81.802422°W |
| | County Line Road | | Bowling Green | 27.646201°N 81.802127°W |
| | Lake Branch Road | | Bowling Green | 27.646201°N 81.802127°W |
| Heard Bridge | Heard Bridge Road | | Wauchula | 27.575748°N 81.804507°W |
| | SR-636 (East Main Street) | | Wauchula | 27.550552°N 81.793650°W |
| | Griffin Road | | Wauchula | 27.540773°N 81.791993°W |
| Doyle E. Carlton Bridge | US 17 | | Zolfo Springs | 27.504464°N 81.800392°W |
| | FL 64 | | Zolfo Springs | 27.499605°N 81.810426°W |
| | NE Brownville Street | | Brownville | 27.302668°N 81.846136°W |
| | Seminole Gulf Railway | | Arcadia | 27.236562°N 81.886005°W |
| | Footbridge (Old SR 70 bridge) | | Arcadia | 27.222132°N 81.876162°W |
| | FL 70 | | Arcadia | 27.221049°N 81.876462°W |
| | CR 760 | | Arcadia | 27.162392°N 81.901656°W |
| | CR 761 | | Fort Ogden | 27.088557°N 81.993994°W |
| | I-75 | | Solana | 26.960237°N 82.020220°W |
| Barron Collier Bridge and Gilchrist Bridge | US 41 | | Punta Gorda | 26.945115°N 82.057946°W |
| Mouth (Charlotte Harbor) | | | | |

== See also ==
- Kissingen Springs
- South Atlantic-Gulf Water Resource Region
- Peace River Manasota Regional Water Supply Authority
