= Punta Gorda station =

- Punta Gorda Atlantic Coast Line Depot
- U.S. National Register of Historic Places
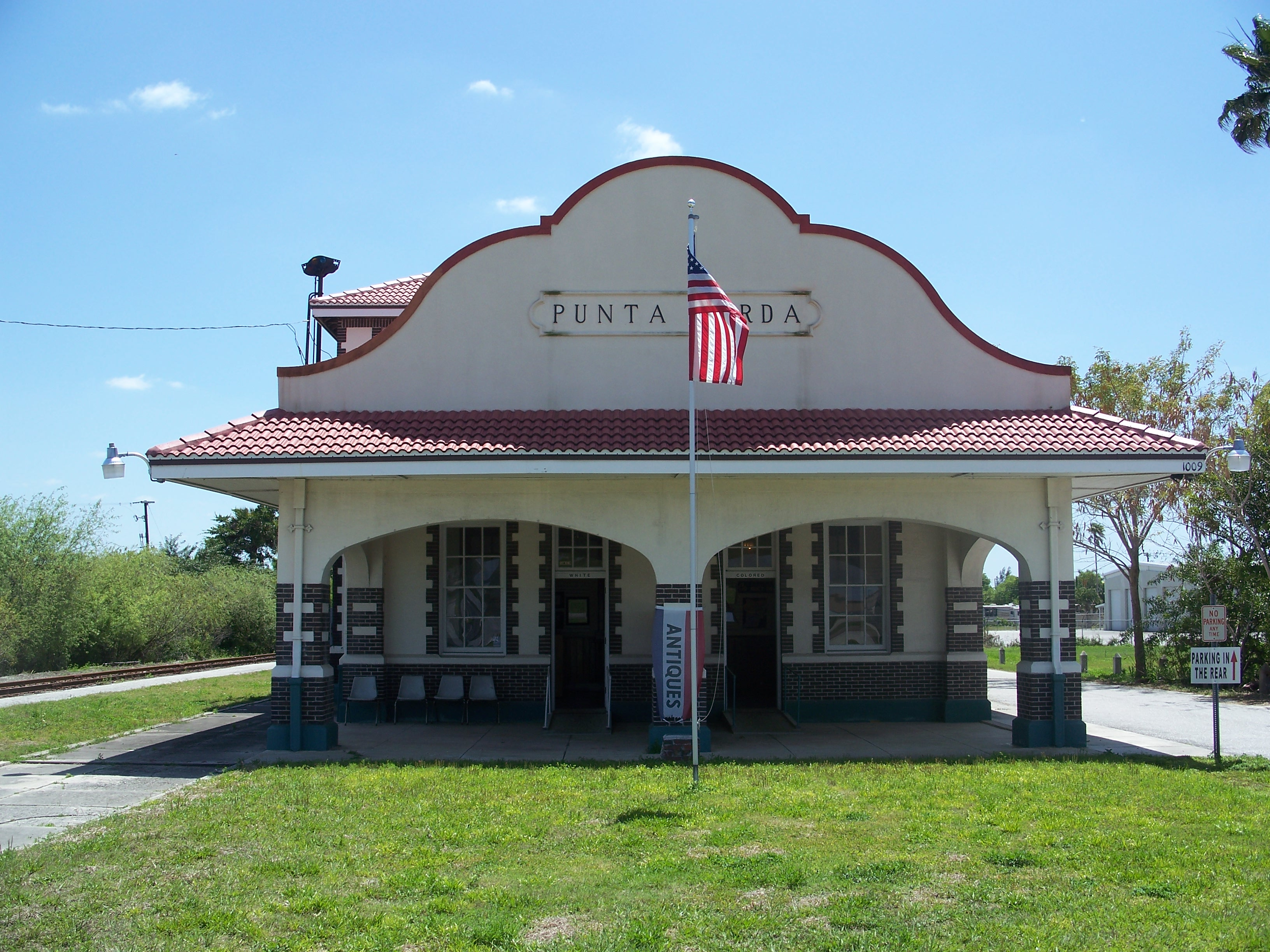

- Location within Florida Location within the United States
- Location: Punta Gorda, Florida, United States
- Coordinates: 26°55′47″N 82°2′45″W
- Built: 1928
- Architectural style: Mediterranean Revival
- MPS: Punta Gorda MPS
- NRHP reference No.: 90001797
- Added to NRHP: December 12, 1990

The Punta Gorda Atlantic Coast Line Depot is a historic Atlantic Coast Line Railroad depot in Punta Gorda, Florida, United States. It is located at 1009 Taylor Road.

Owned and maintained by the Punta Gorda Historical Society, the building houses a Black history exhibit and an antique mall. On December 12, 1990, it was added to the U.S. National Register of Historic Places.

== History ==
The Atlantic Coast Line Railroad built the depot in 1928 as one of many investments it made to its railroad network during the Florida land boom of the 1920s. It served as Punta Gorda's third passenger rail depot, replacing earlier depots built by the Atlantic Coast Line's predecessor the Florida Southern Railway. The original depot, built in 1886, was a small frame depot located within the railroad's turning wye. The second depot, built in 1897, was slightly larger and was located along King Street (which today carries northbound U.S. Highway 41). It was demolished along with the Coast Line's King Street dock to accommodate the construction of the original Barron Collier Bridge over the Peace River.

The Punta Gorda depot was built in Neo-Spanish architecture, and was one of only six depots the Atlantic Coast Line built in that style. Of those six, only two still stand today (the other is in Bradenton).

Passenger rail service to Punta Gorda was discontinued in 1971. The building was eventually purchased by local landowner Fred Babcock, who donated it to the Punta Gorda Historical Society in 1996. The building today houses an antique mall.

The depot's platform is still within the railroad's right of way. Seminole Gulf Railway, who operates the rail line today, uses the platform every Christmas season for its Christmas Rail-Boat evening excursions. Passengers arrive from Fort Myers and transfer to a bus for a Christmas light boat tour through Punta Gorda Isles. They then reboard for the return trip to Fort Myers.

== Gallery ==
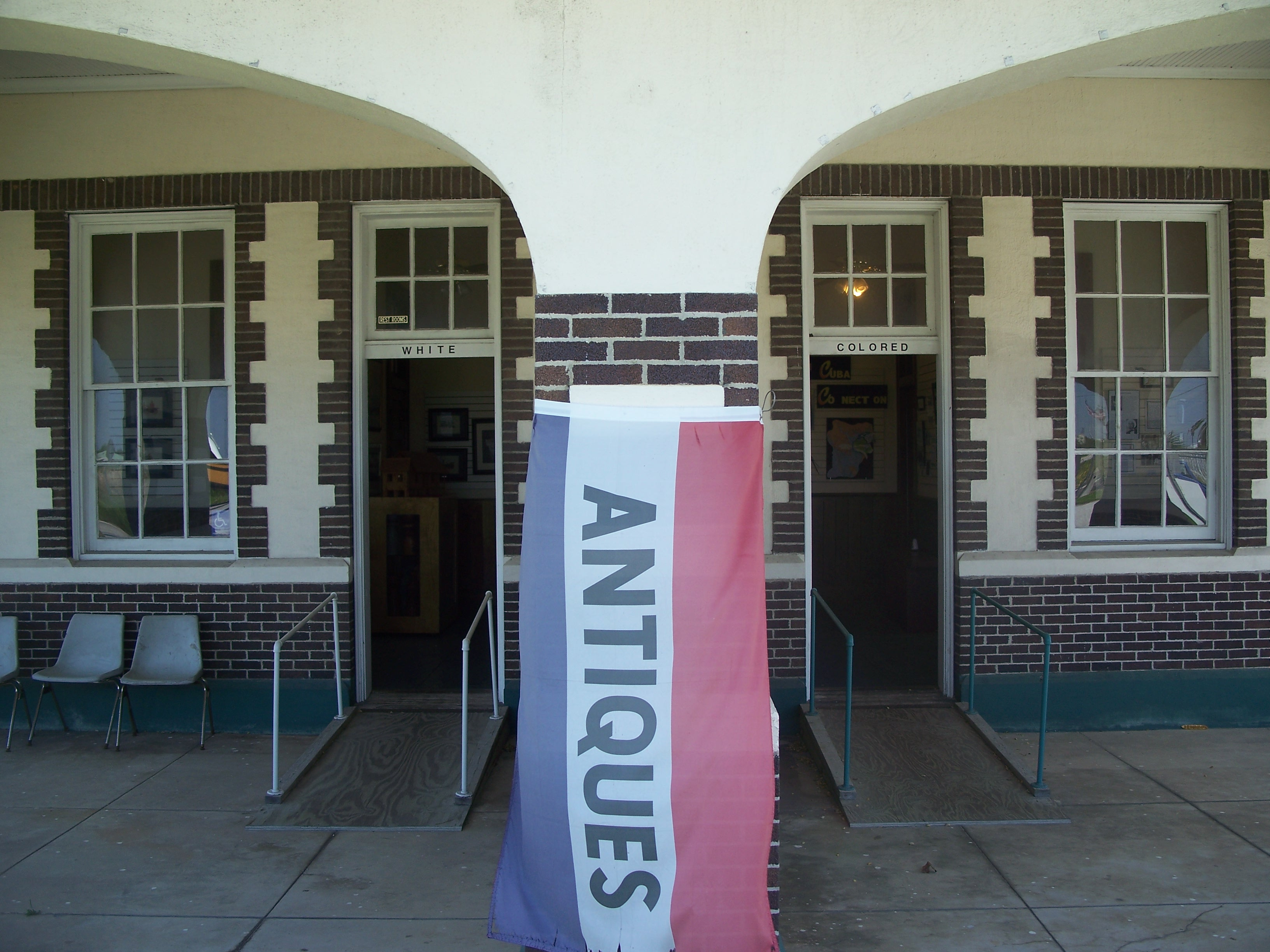
"White" and "Colored" entrances

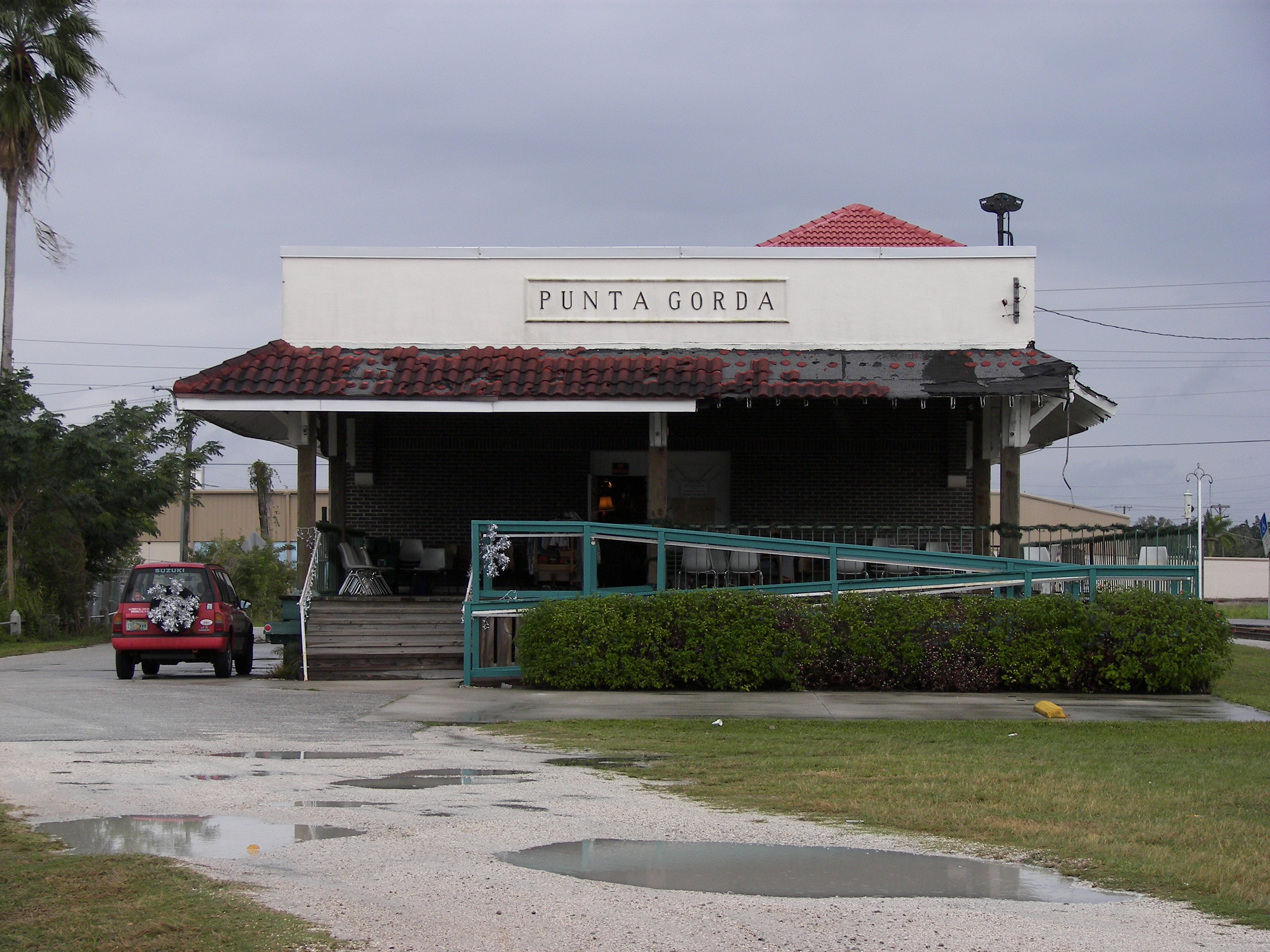
Roof damage from Hurricane Charley

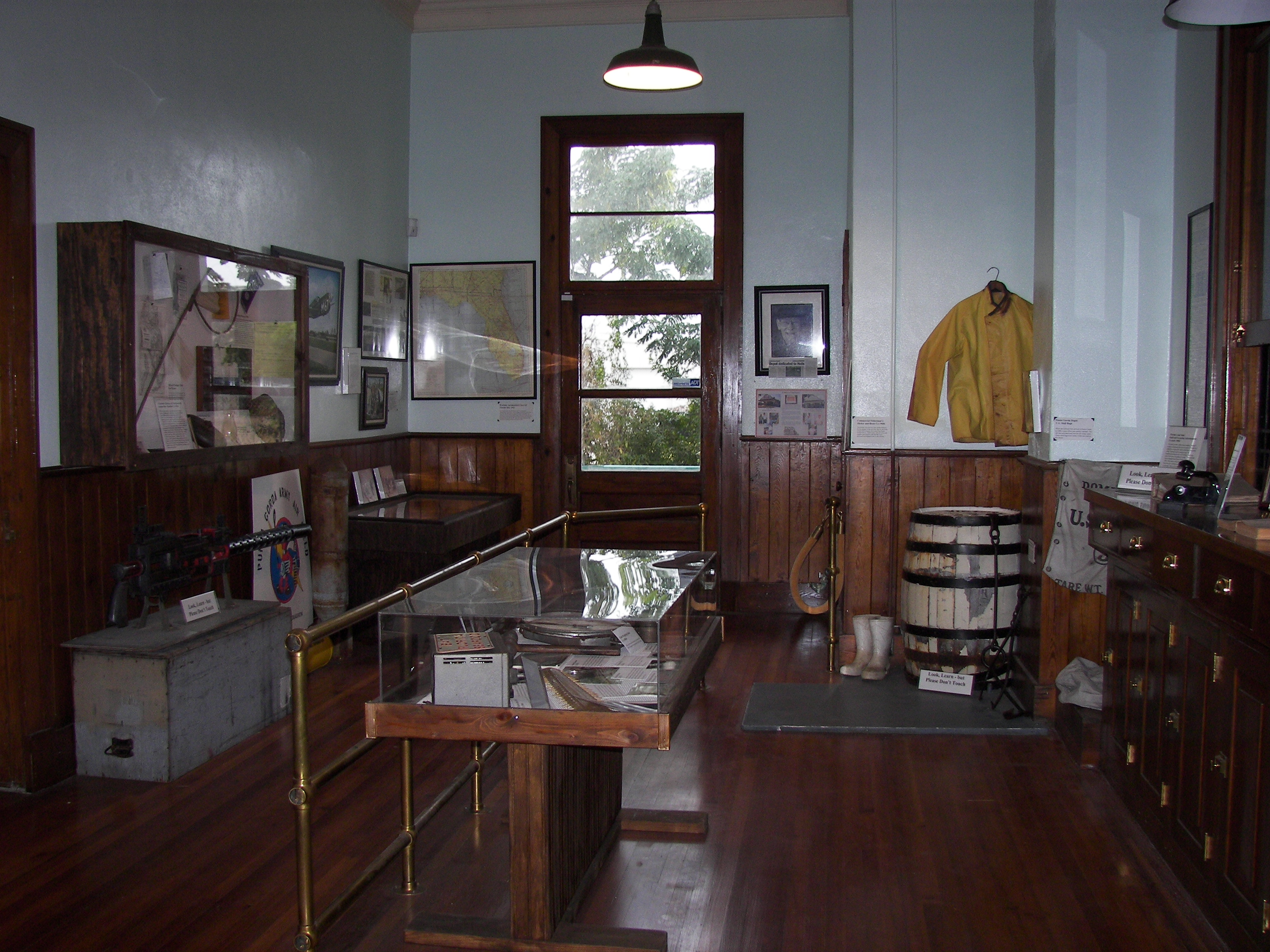
Interior view

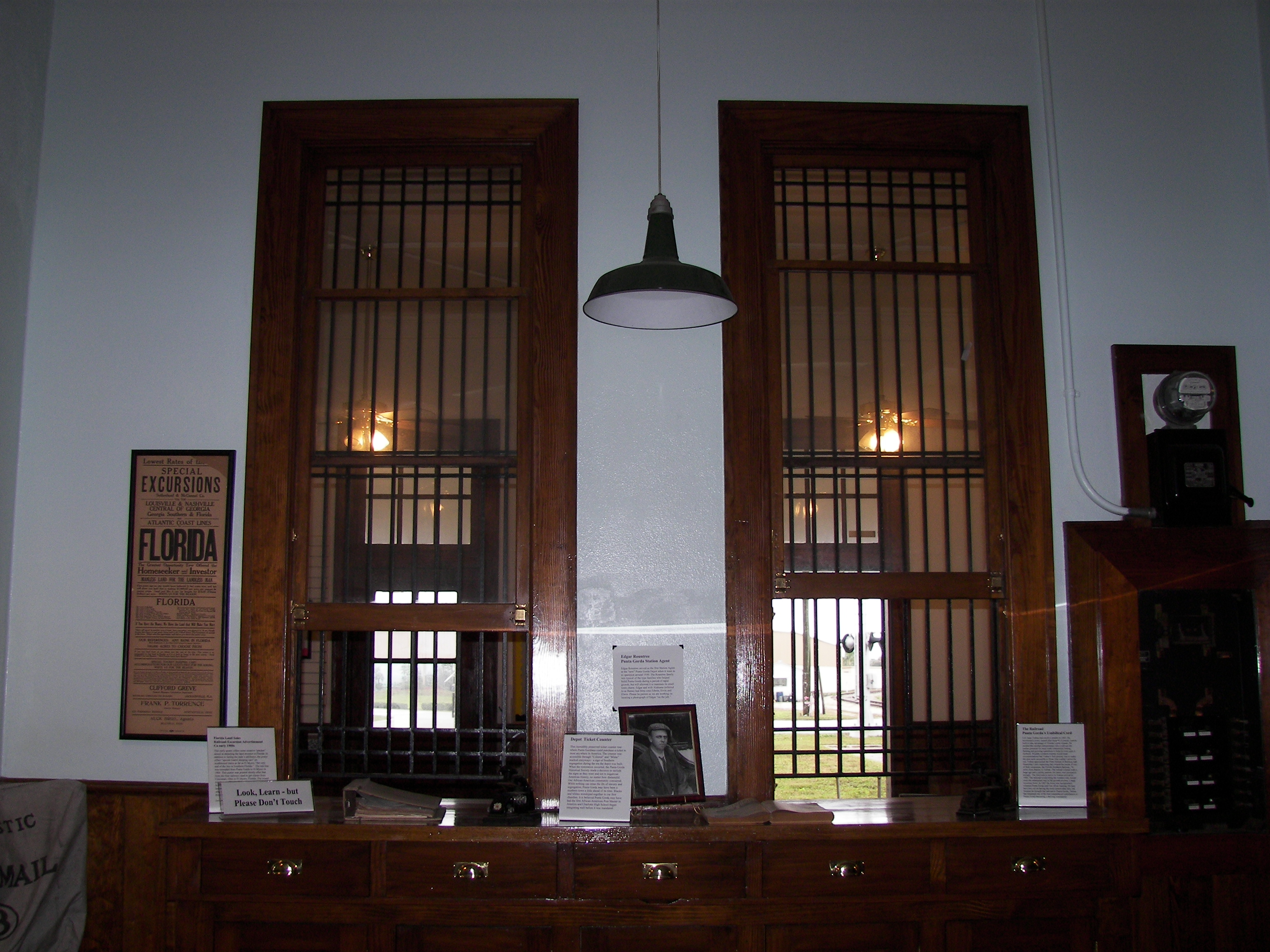
Another interior view

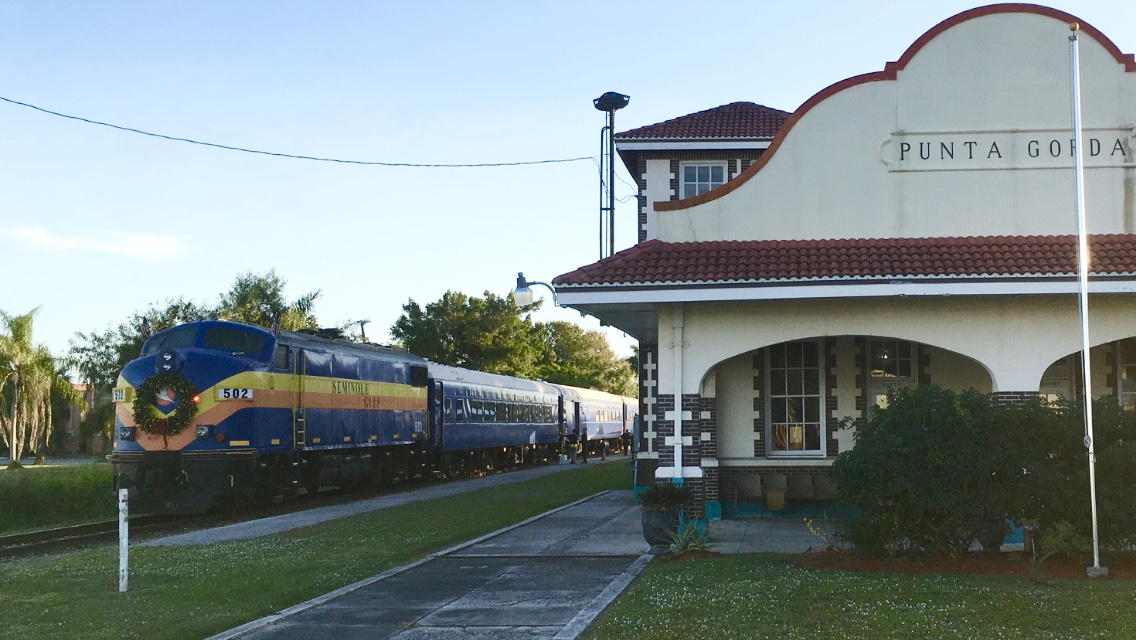
Seminole Gulf Railway Christmas Rail-Boat at Punta Gorda Depot in 2019.

Preceding station	Atlantic Coast Line Railroad	Following station
Cleveland toward Lakeland	Lakeland – Marco Island	Acline toward Marco Island
