= Bowlegs =

Bowlegs or Bowleg may refer to:

== Bowlegs ==
- Bow-leggedness, a leg deformity
- Bolek (died 1819), a Seminole chieftain from Florida during the First Seminole War
- Billy Bowlegs (1810-1864), a Seminole chieftain during the Second and Third Seminole Wars
- Billy Bowlegs III (1862–1965), a Seminole elder
- William Augustus Bowles or "Billy Bowlegs" (1763–1805), an English adventurer
- Bowlegs, Oklahoma
- Bowlegs Creek, a stream in Florida

== Bowleg ==
- Carlton Bowleg, Bahamian politician
- Lisa Bowleg, American psychologist
- Mario Bowleg, Bahamian politician and former basketball coach

== See also ==
- Bowleg Bill
