= Homeland Heritage Park =

Historical park in Homeland, Florida

Coordinates: 27.81909°N 81.82906°W

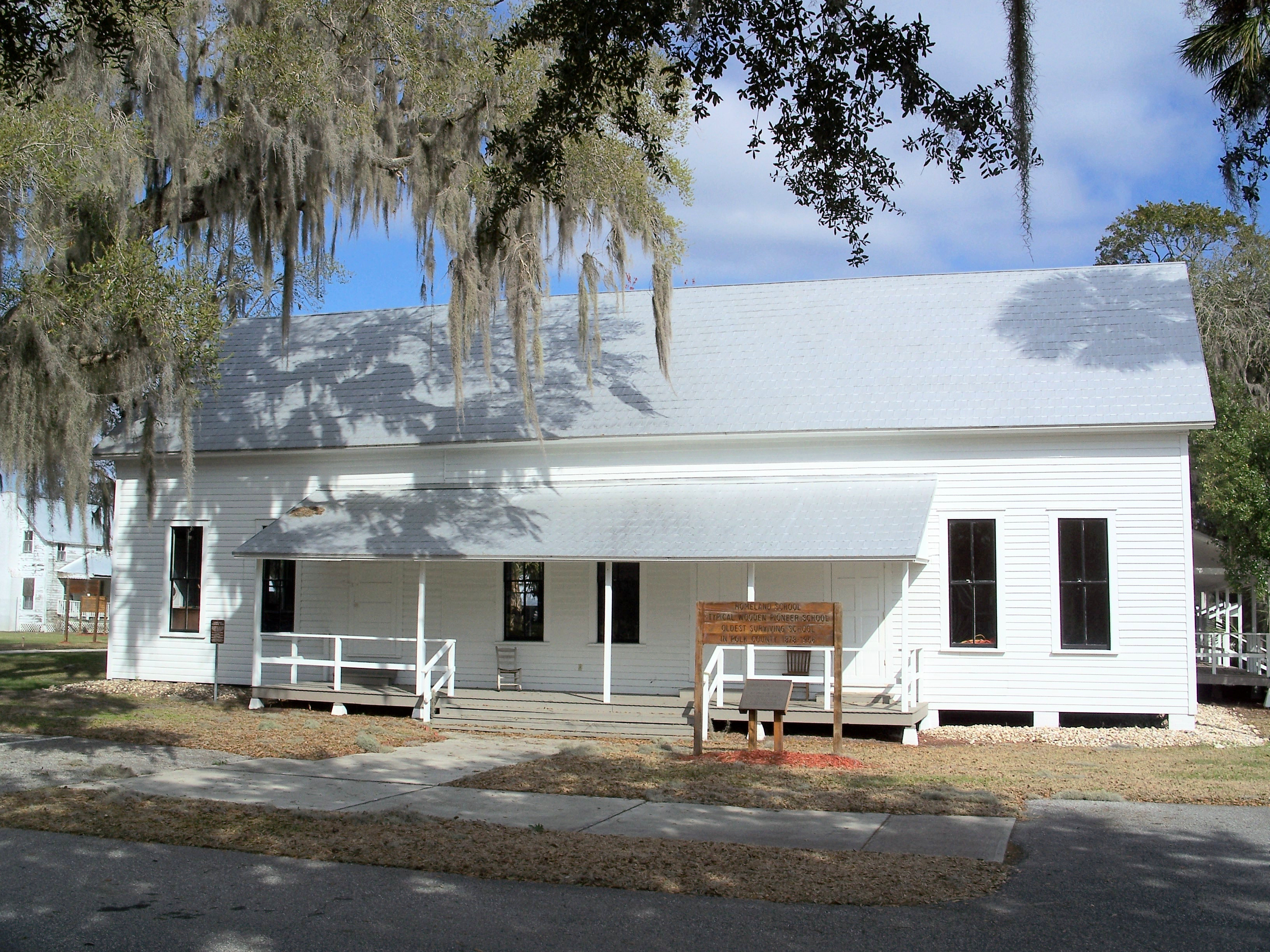
Homeland School at Homeland Heritage Park

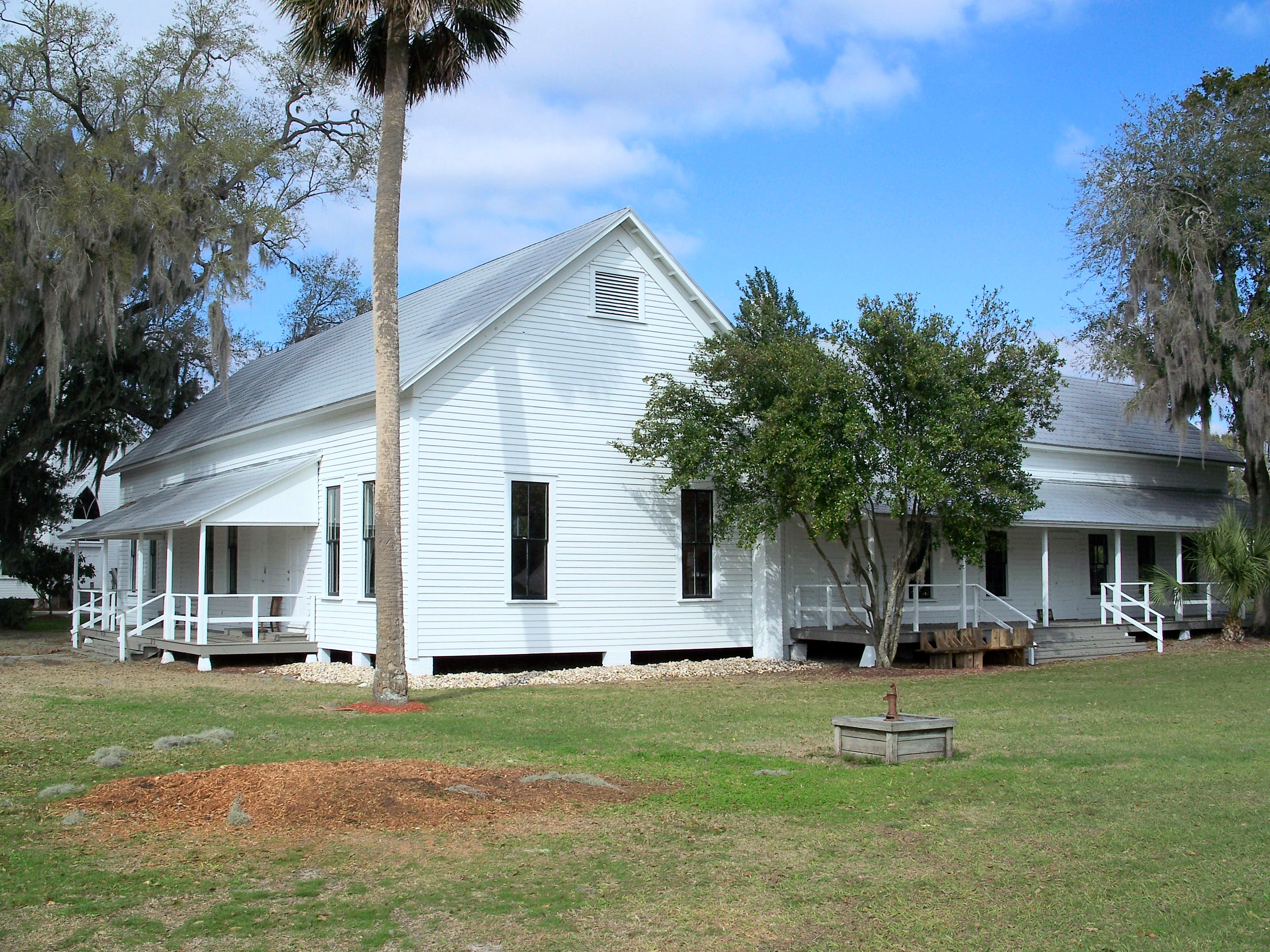
Homeland School at Homeland Heritage Park

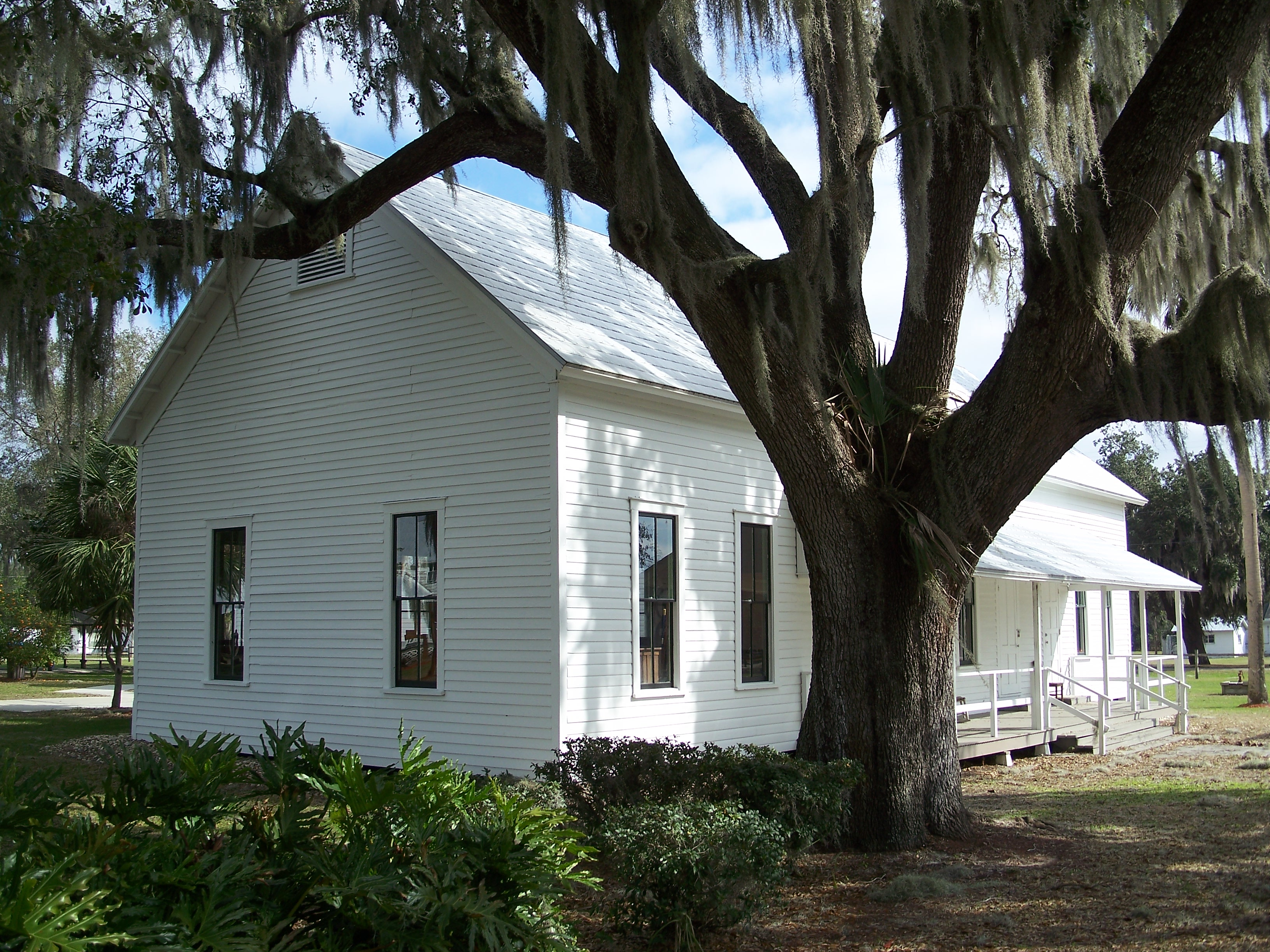
Homeland School at Homeland Heritage Park

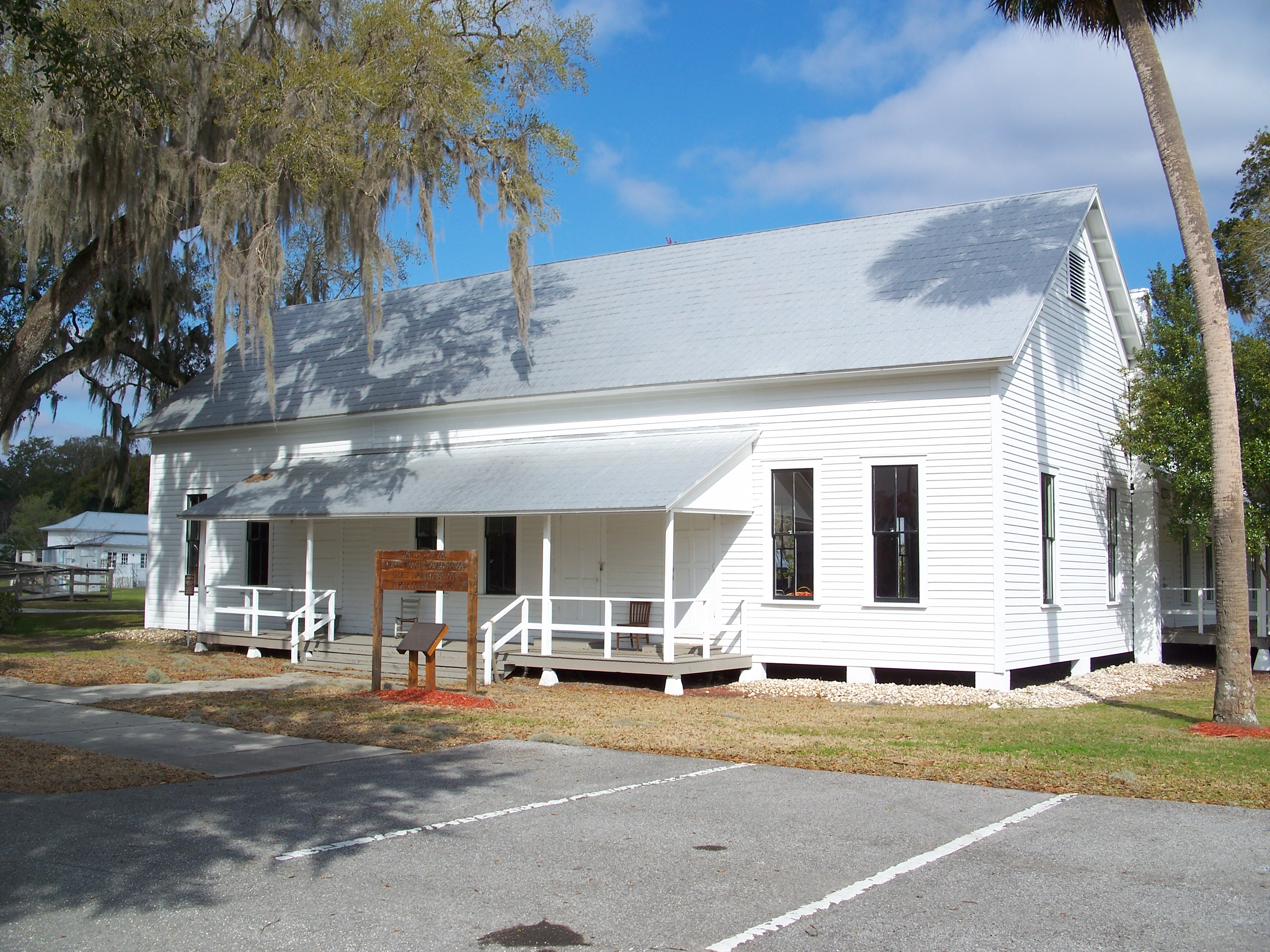
Homeland School at Homeland Heritage Park

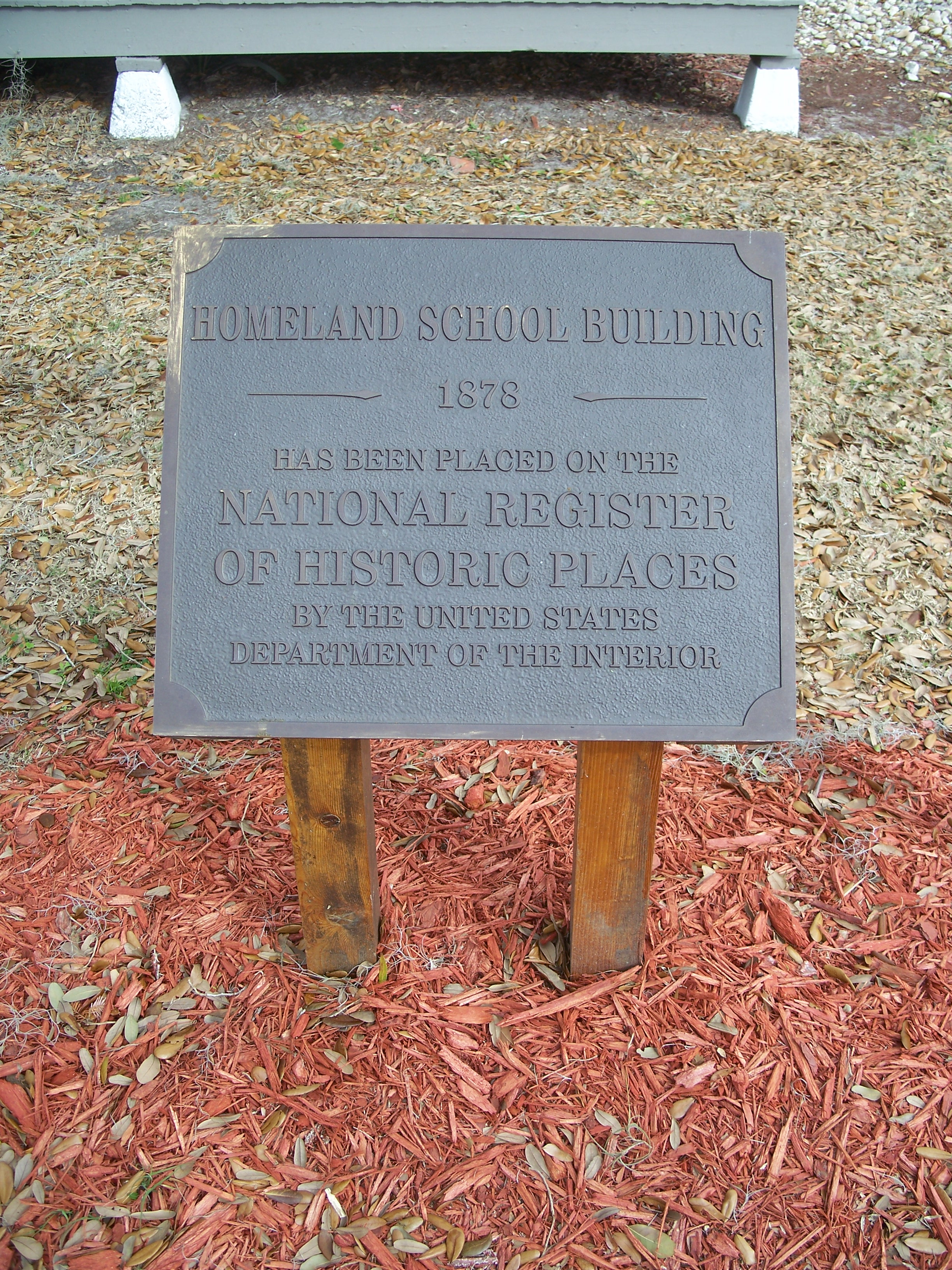
Homeland School plaque at Homeland Heritage Park

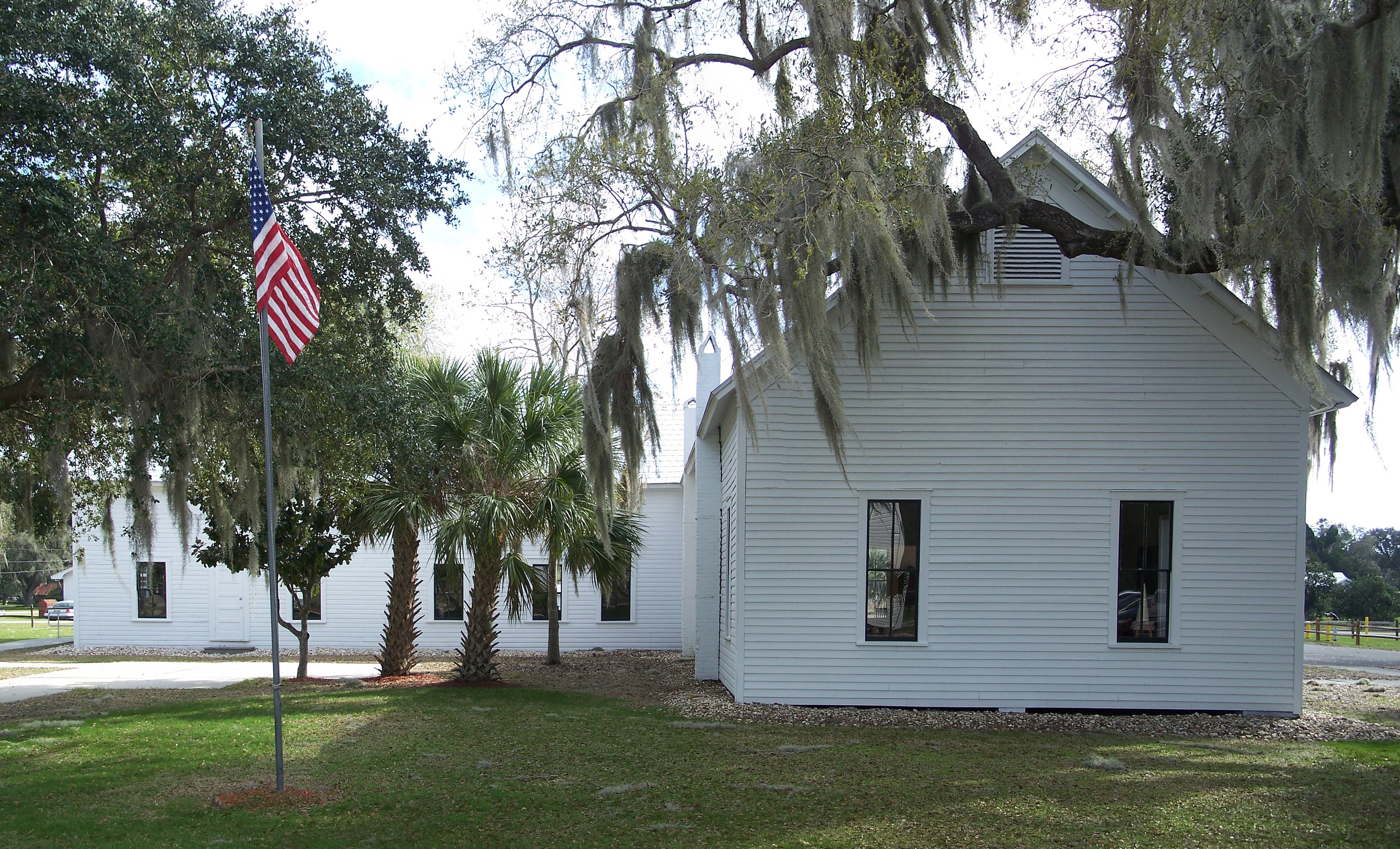
Homeland School at Homeland Heritage Park

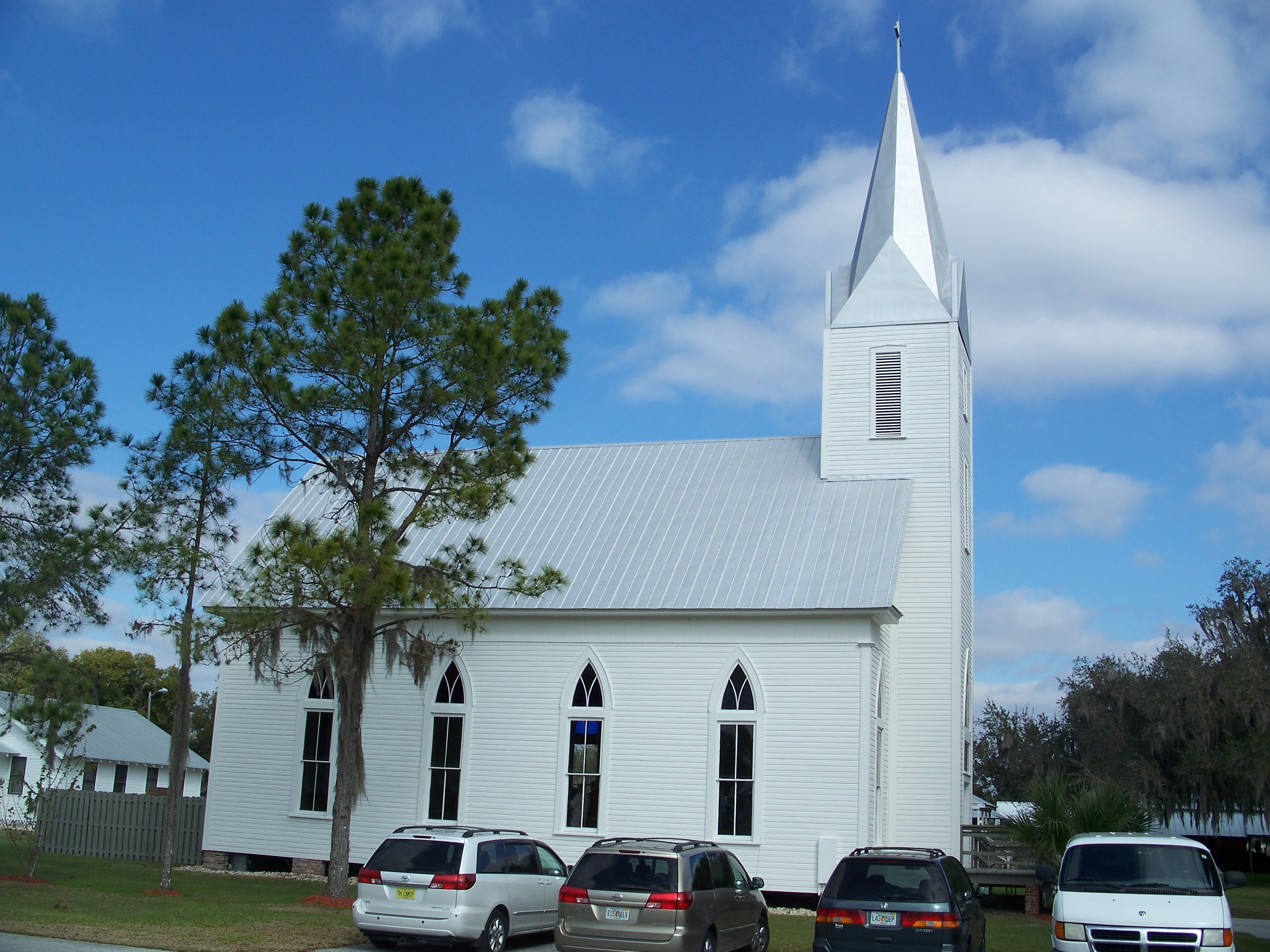
Homeland Methodist Church at the Homeland Heritage Park

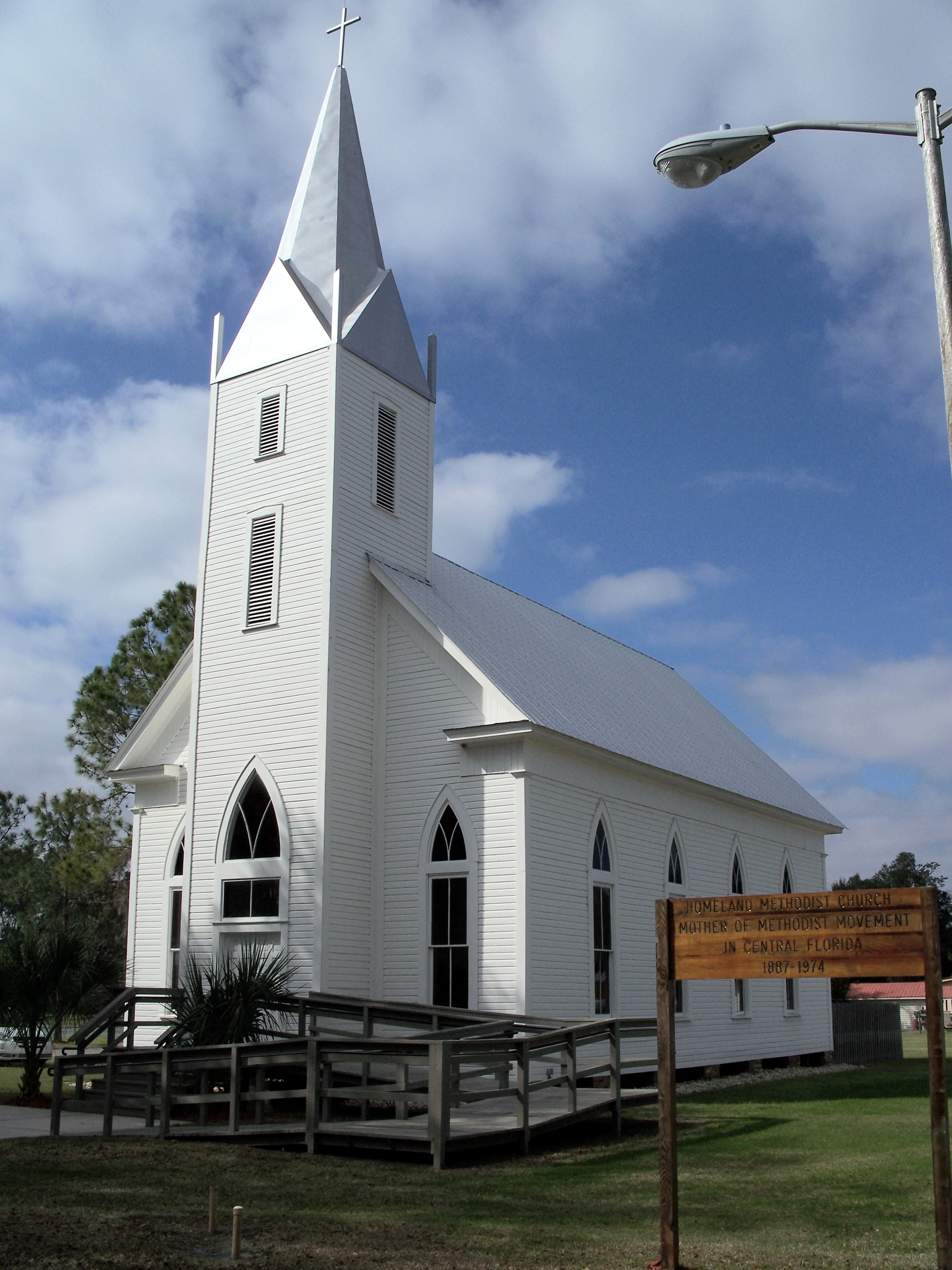
Homeland Methodist Church at the Homeland Heritage Park

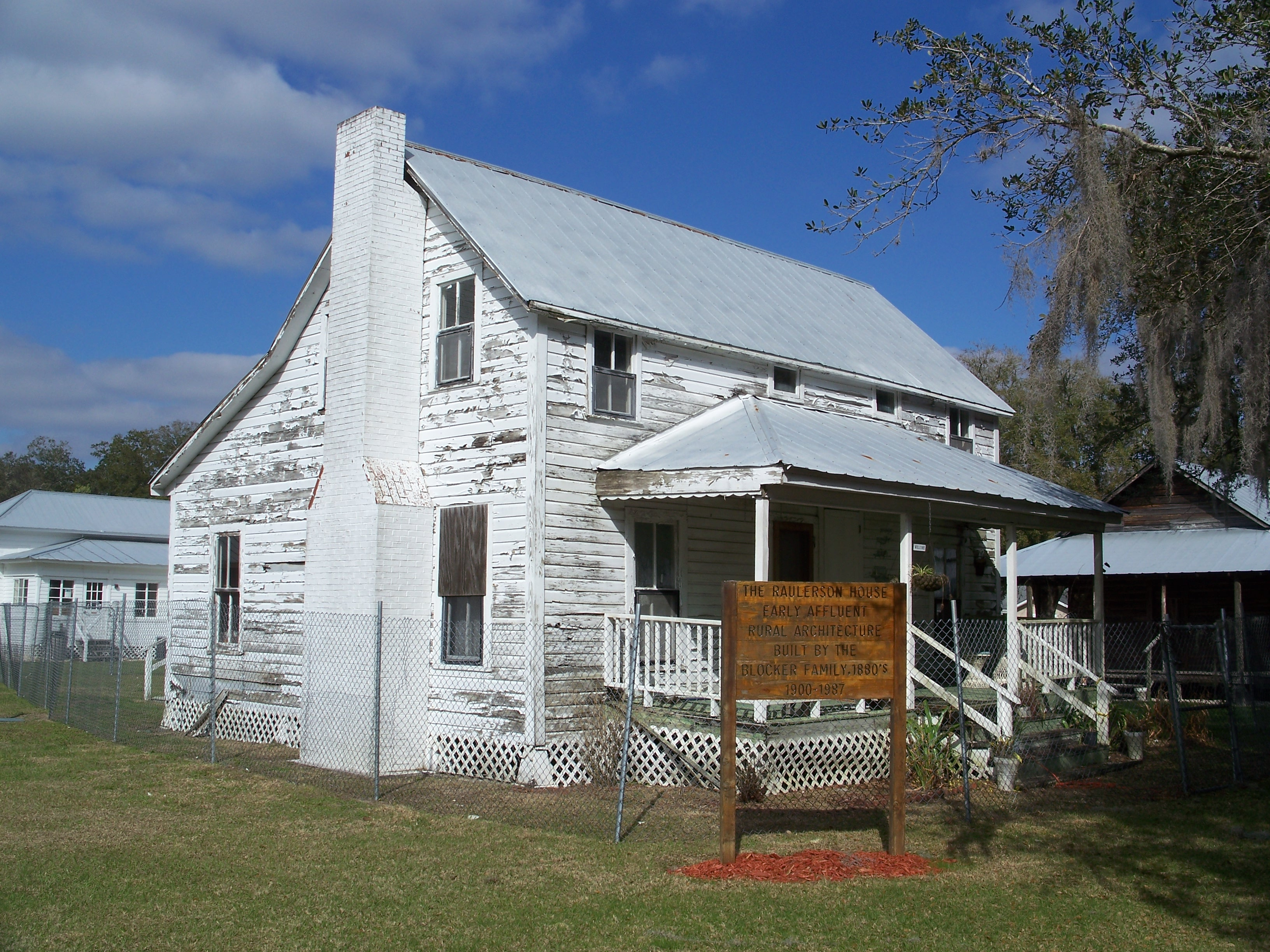
Raulerson House

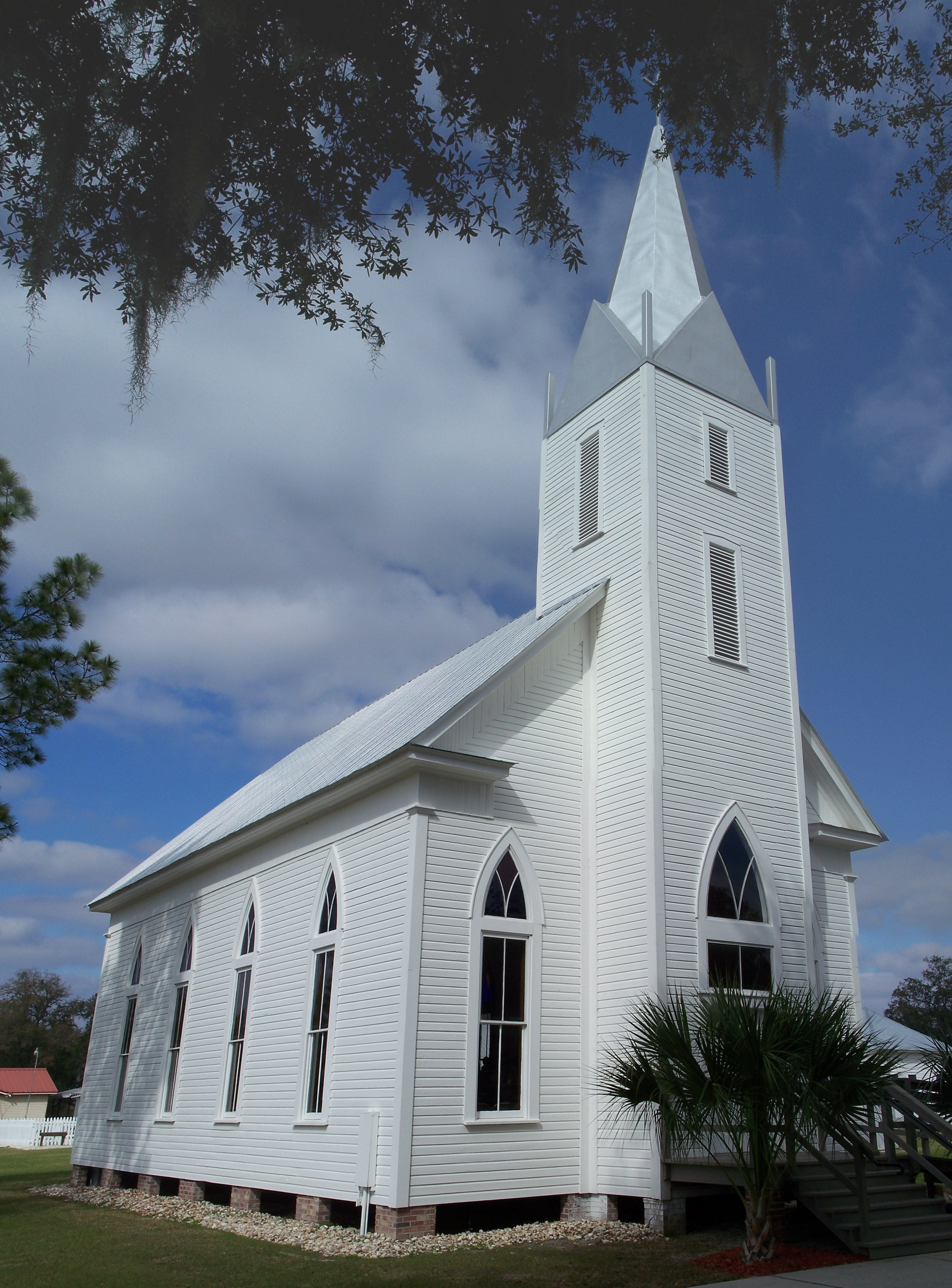
Homeland Methodist Church

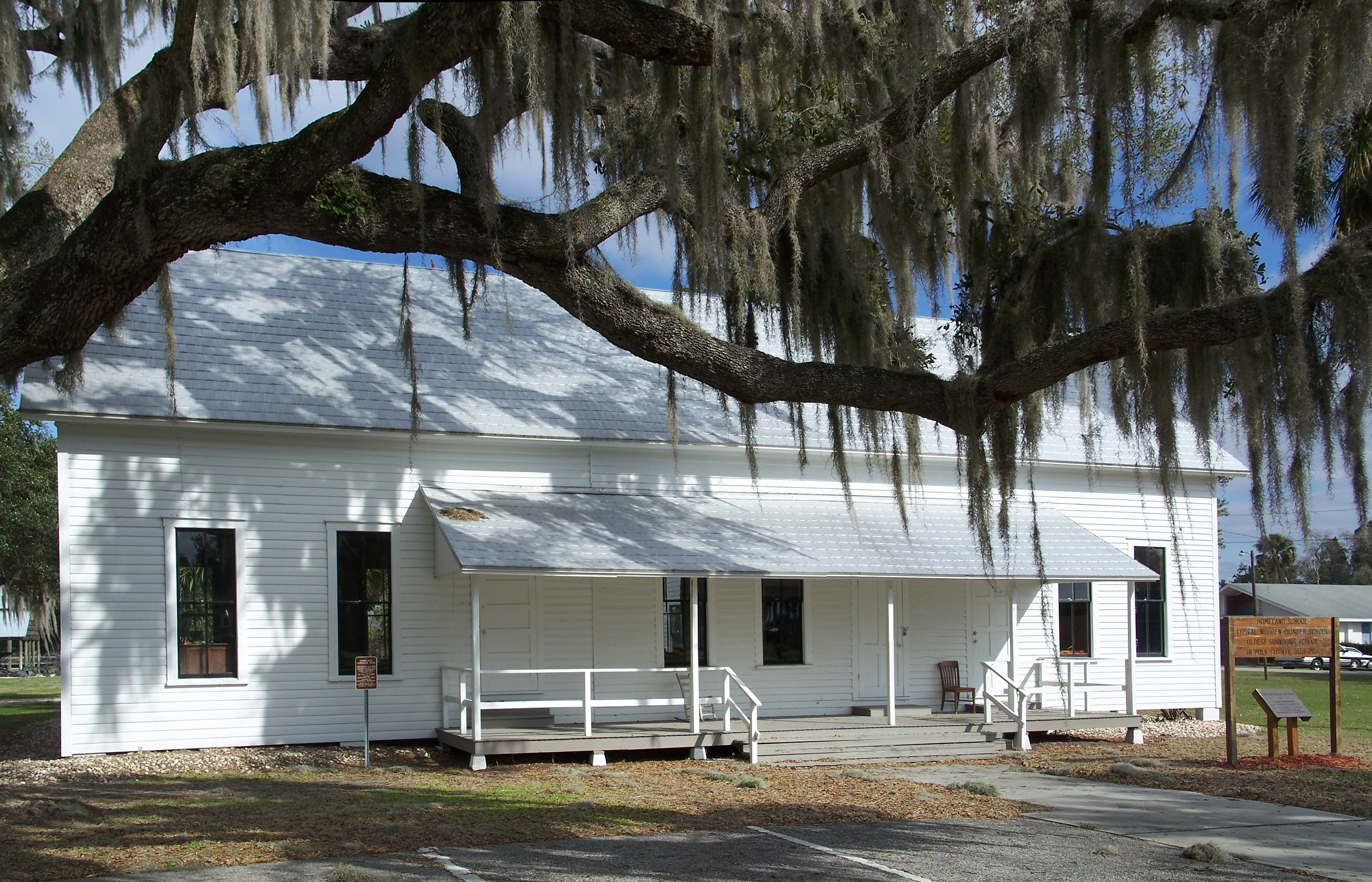
Homeland School

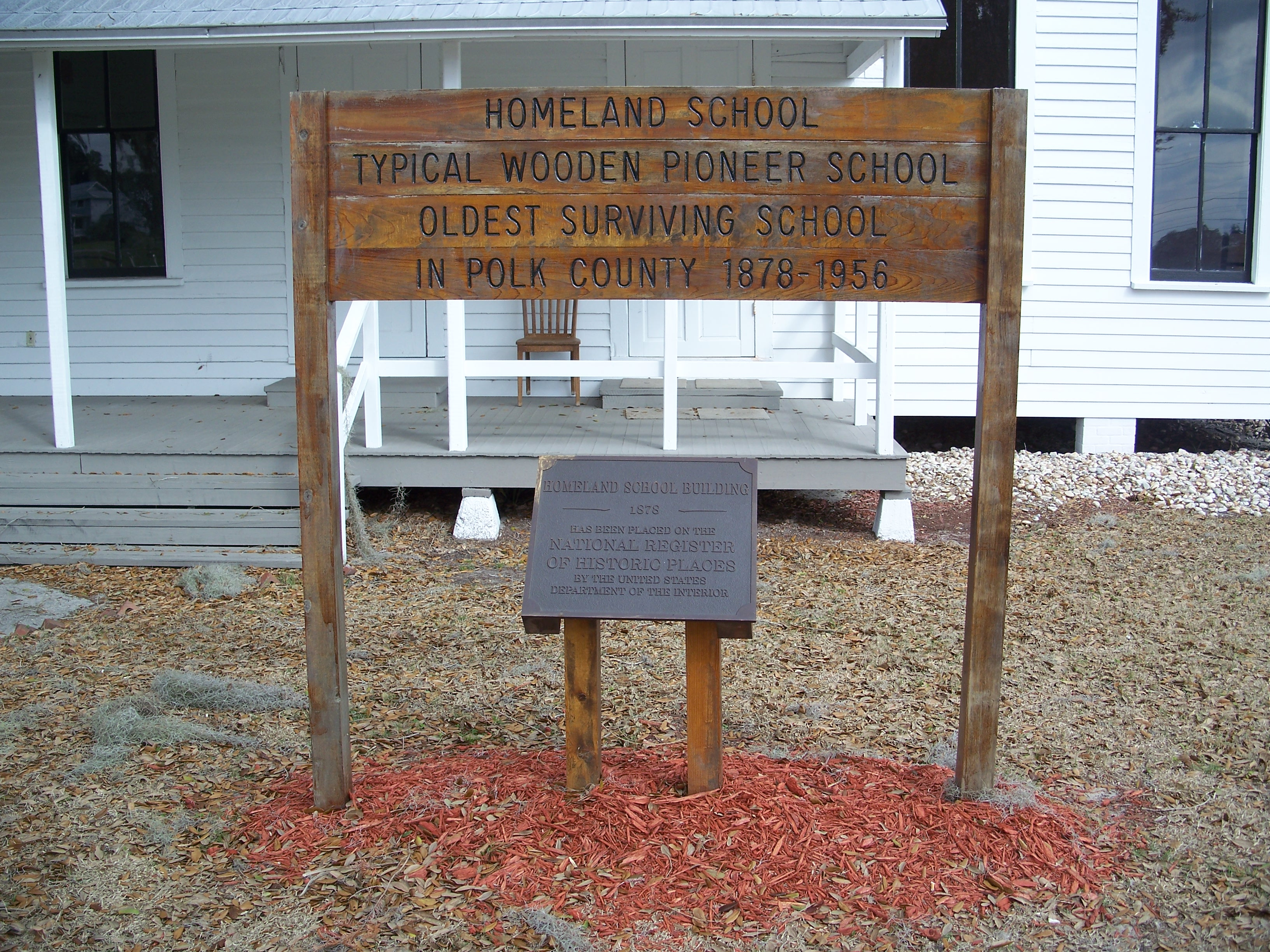
Homeland School plaque

Homeland Heritage Park is a historical park in Homeland, Florida, Polk County, Florida. The site includes the 1878 Homeland School building, the 1887 Old Homeland Methodist Church, the former Methodist parsonage and church annex, an English family's log cabin and barn from 1888 and the 1880 Raulerson House. Homeland Heritage Park is located at 249 Church Avenue in Homeland, Florida.

== See also ==
- List of museums in Florida
