= Charlie Creek (Florida) =

Creek in Florida, United States

Coordinates: 27°20′59″N 81°49′32″W

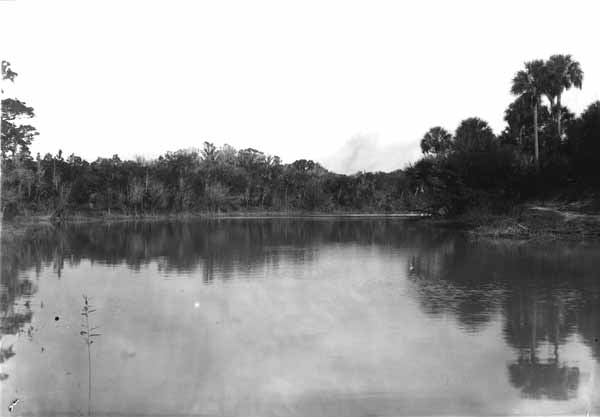
Charlie Apopka Creek in 1918

Charlie Creek is a stream in Hardee County and Polk County, Florida, in the United States.

One etymology is that the stream was named for an otherwise unknown Seminole chief Charlie Apopka, Another etymology states that "Charlie Apopka" is likely a corruption of chalo apopka, meaning "trout (or bass) eating place". It was known as Charlie Apopka Creek or Big Charlie Apopka Creek in the 19th century.

Charlie Creek is an important tributary of the Peace River, discharging a mean of 262 cubic feet (7.4 m^{3}) per day into the river. It is 42 miles (68 km) long with a basin 334 square miles (870 km^{2}) in area in Desoto, Hardee, Highlands, and Polk counties. Average elevation of the stream is less than 60 feet (18 m) above sea level, ranging from 80 feet (24 m) above sea level at the source to 30 feet (9.1 m) at the juncture with the Peace River.

== See also ==
- List of rivers of Florida
