= Payne Creek (Florida) =

Stream in Florida

- Location within Florida Location within the United States

Physical characteristics
- Source
  - coordinates: 27.6953099°N 82.0495312°W
- Mouth
  - coordinates: 27.6192012°N 81.8014713°W

Payne Creek (or Paynes Creek) is a tributary of the Peace River in Hardee County and Polk County, Florida, in the United States.

In April 1849, a trading post to serve Seminoles was built at the juncture of a stream then known as Hatse Lotka with the Peace River. On July 17, 1849, four Seminoles killed George Payne, the manager of the trading post, and James Whidden, the assistant manager. The site of the trading post is now in the Paynes Creek Historic State Park.

== See also ==
- List of rivers of Florida
