= Bartow Branch =

Overview
- Other name: Bartow Subdivision
- Status: Some segments are still operating
- Owner: Atlantic Coast Line Railroad
- Locale: Central Florida

Technical
- Line length: 15.4 mi (24.8 km)
- Track gauge: 1,435 mm (4 ft 8 1/2 in) standard gauge
- Electrification: No
- Signalling: None

The Bartow Branch was a railroad line in Central Florida that historically ran from Lake Alfred southwest to Bartow. It was originally built by the South Florida Railroad in the 1800s and was part of the Atlantic Coast Line Railroad network from the early 1900s to 1967. Part of the line is still in service today.

== Route description ==
The Bartow Branch began at a junction with the main line in Lake Alfred. From here, it ran south through Winter Haven before turning southwest. It then passed through Eagle Lake and Gordonville to Bartow, where it terminated at a junction with the Lakeland—Fort Myers Line.

== History ==
=== South Florida Railroad ===
The Bartow Branch was originally built in 1884 by the South Florida Railroad. While the South Florida Railroad's main line ran from Sanford to Tampa, the Bartow Branch was built because the railroad's charter specified that the line must serve Bartow. The branch was converted to standard gauge in 1886.

The beginning of the branch at the main line would be known briefly as Bartow Junction, which would later become the city of Lake Alfred. At the south end in Bartow, the branch would connect with the South Florida Railroad's Pemberton Ferry Branch as well as the Florida Southern Railway's Charlotte Harbor Division.

In 1893, the South Florida Railroad would become part of the Plant System, the railroad network of Henry B. Plant.

=== Atlantic Coast Line Railroad ===
In 1903, the Plant System was acquired by the Atlantic Coast Line Railroad, who would continue operating the Bartow Branch. The South Florida Railroad's main line would become the southernmost segment of the Atlantic Coast Line's main line. The South Florida Railroad's Pemberton Ferry Branch and the Florida Southern Railway would eventually become the Atlantic Coast Line's Lakeland—Fort Myers Line.

In 1912, the Atlantic Coast Line built a spur from the Bartow Branch at Florence Villa (just north of Winter Haven) northeast to Lucerne Park, which existed until the early 1960s.

For much of its history, the Atlantic Coast Line would run both passenger and freight service along the Bartow Branch. Local passenger trains would often run from Lake Alfred to Bartow, then continue south to Fort Myers.

In the 1950s, the Atlantic Coast Line realigned the Bartow Branch's connection to the Lakeland—Fort Myers Line in Bartow slightly north. This was done to accommodate the construction of Van Fleet Drive, which was built to carry a realigned U.S Route 98 (and later State Road 60) to bypass Downtown Bartow.

=== Mergers and consolidation ===
In 1967, the Atlantic Coast Line Railroad merged with its rival, the Seaboard Air Line Railroad. The Bartow Branch notably crossed the Seaboard Air Line's Miami Subdivision in Winter Haven. After the merger was complete, the combined company was named the Seaboard Coast Line Railroad. The Seaboard Coast Line would adopt the Seaboard Air Line's method of naming their lines as subdivisions which resulted in the Bartow Branch being designated the Bartow Subdivision. While the Bartow Subdivision remained intact after the merger, passenger service was discontinued with only local freight running on it.

In the early 1980s, the Seaboard Coast Line abandoned the south end of the line from Bartow to Gordonville (near the Bartow Executive Airport). By 1983, track from Lake Alfred to Winter Haven was also abandoned.

== Current conditions ==
Part of the Bartow branch remains today from Winter Haven south to Gordonville (just northeast of Bartow). This segment is operated by the Florida Midland Railroad. The abandoned segment between Lake Alfred and Winter Haven is now the route of the Chain of Lakes Trail.

== Historic stations ==
Milepost	City/Location	Station	Image	Connections and notes
AW 835.6	Lake Alfred	Lake Alfred		junction with Atlantic Coast Line Railroad Main Line
AW 839.1	Winter Haven	Florence Villa		junction with Lucerne Park spur
AW 842.0	Winter Haven	Winter Haven		junction with Seaboard Air Line Railroad Miami Subdivision
AW 844.0	Eagle Lake	Eagle Lake		
AW 848.0		Gordonville		
AW 851.0	Bartow	Bartow		junction with: Lakeland—Fort Myers Line; Seaboard Air Line Railroad Valrico Subdivision

== See also ==
- Main Line (Atlantic Coast Line Railroad)
- Lakeland—Fort Myers Line
- Haines City Branch
