= Brownville, Florida =

Unincorporated community in Florida, U.S.

- Unincorporated community
- Interactive map of Brownville, Florida
- Coordinates: 27°17′53″N 81°49′26″W
- Country: United States
- State: Florida
- County: DeSoto
- Elevation: 75 ft (23 m)
- Time zone: UTC-5 (EST)
  - Summer (DST): UTC-4 (EDT)
- Area code: 863
- GNIS feature ID: 294241

Brownville is an unincorporated community in DeSoto County, Florida, United States, located 6 miles (9.7 km) north northeast of the city of Arcadia.

Brownville, originally named Haymanville, was founded prior to the US Civil War, and by the late 1800s, it was one of several stations on the Florida Southern Railway (later the Atlantic Coast Line Railroad). The community was originally located in Manatee County, until the creation of DeSoto County. Brownville was under consideration for county seat of DeSoto County, but that honor went to nearby Arcadia.

The Brownville area attracted more than 300 residents circa 1920. The closures of the Brownville School and the Brownville Post Office occurred in 1948 and 1952, respectively.

== History ==
=== Civil War era ===
Brownville was originally named Haymanville, in honor of William Hayman. The area was settled before the US Civil War. Circa 1858, the Peace River area of Florida was being settled. Among the earliest families in the Brownville area were the James Washington Mathis and Rowland Williams families. By the 1870s, Brownville remained one of the small, isolated communities in that part of what was then Manatee County.

=== Late 19th century ===
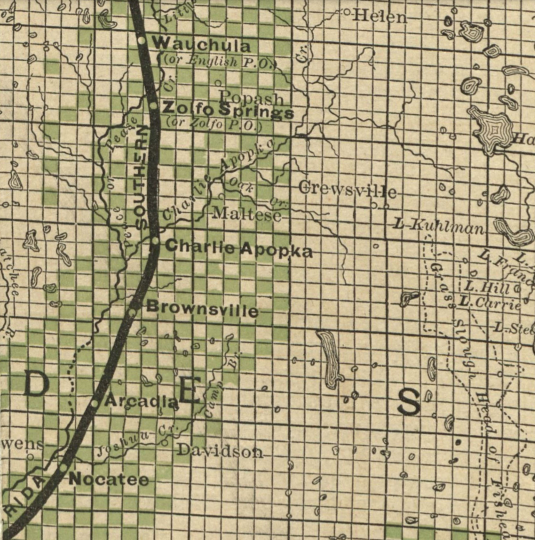
The Florida Southern Railway in 1888, showing Brownville south of Charlie Apopka and north of Arcadia

In May 1887, when DeSoto County was formed from part of Manatee County, Brownville was one of several communities in the running for county seat (others being Pine Level, Nocatee, and Arcadia). Due to a yellow fever quarantine in the county, the original August vote was postponed. If Brownville was selected, landowner Chris Pierce pledged 80 acres (0.32 km^{2}) of land. County voters selected Arcadia on November 6, 1888. According to author Robert Lee Thompson, "When the CH&N Railroad was contemplating building their railroad to Boca Grande, they specified Brownville as the northern terminal in the charter. That was later changed to Pierce."

The Florida Southern Railway established a station at Brownville in 1888. Brownville was the station between Charlie Apopka and Arcadia. The railroad would be acquired by the Atlantic Coast Line (ACL) Railroad in 1903.

Brownville Methodist Church was formed in 1892, on Highway 17. The original building was a small house. A wooden, rectangular building replaced it in 1900. This building had "art glass windows, bell and [a] piano." A steeple was added in 1919, and a portico in 1925. The first clergyman was W.B. Treson. In 1939, the clergyman was Philip T. Schuyler.

The Brownville post office opened in 1897. Around this time, major crops in the area included Irish potatoes and beans. The Florida Agriculturist reported that the Brownville area was the export site of a "large quantity" of these crops.

=== 20th century ===
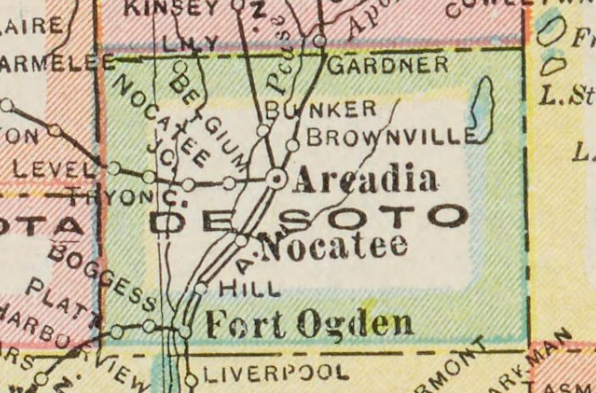
DeSoto County, Florida, 1925, showing Brownville

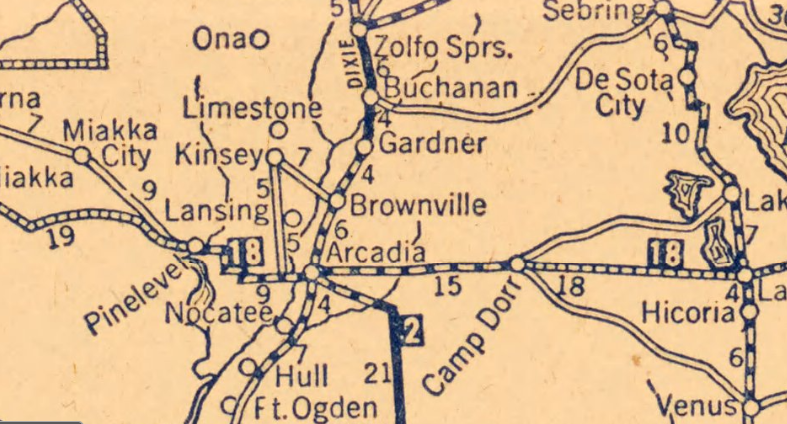
Brownville, Florida area 1926

In 1903, a smallpox outbreak occurred in the area. Patients in Nocatee and Brownville were quarantined, and then residents of those communities and Arcadia were vaccinated.

A school opened in Brownville in August 1905. This schoolhouse had two teachers, and the DeSoto News reported that on opening, there were "quite a number of pupils" in the classrooms.

Brownville was platted in 1906, with one correspondent in the Arcadia Champion remarking, "Brownville, like the rest of DeSoto towns, is constantly growing. You hear the hammer and saw in every direction. Work on the Wey packing house is nearing completion and the Orr house is about halfway complete. [...] We had Surveyor Clark with us all last week, running streets and lots. There is quite a bit of hands grubbing land and taking out stumps [...] there is quite a lot of improvement going on in and around our town. Our school, I am happy to report, is doing nicely. Another issue praised "Busy Brownville [...] the healthiest locality in DeSoto county". The Desoto County News was similarly effusive that year, writing, "Brownville is still on a boom". Brownville was also the location of the Baldwin Brothers packing house. Circa 1908, the company was shipping citrus fruit from the Brownville area.

Brownville Baptist Church was founded in 1919. The congregation's first services were held in the Methodist church on the east side of Highway 17. The white frame building was constructed later that year. The first pastor was A.J. Holt. In 1939, the pastor was J.B. Coston; church membership at that time was 39. This church is still in operation.

The population of Brownville was 315 in 1920.

The 1925 Brownville School was a two-story brick building with four classrooms; it was constructed that year. Brownville School was a K-8 school and had 36 students in the 1937-1938 school year. Seventh and eighth grades were removed in 1940, but there were still 20 pupils at that time. The Brownville School was closed at the end of the 1947-1948 school year. According to the county superintendent of schools, the school was closed after the community (and other area communities) began to dwindle, after timber resources had been drained. "[E]ventually roads were built and the children grew up and left to find employment in Arcadia or some other town. No one remained on the farms except the old folks, who, in most cases sold their land to big cattle owners, and moved in town where there are more conveniences."

Brownville's population was 125 in 1940.

The Brownville post office closed in 1952. In the 1980s, Brownville was still noted for its farms and citrus groves, with Robert Lee Thompson writing, "the citrus and farming industries came on strongly in the area and now there are several good groves in the area."

Brownville is noted for its fossils. Fossils discovered include Megalodon and camel and bison teeth.

== Geography ==
Brownville is 6 miles (9.7 km) from Arcadia, the county seat.

== See also ==
- Southfort, Florida
