= Eaton Park, Florida =

- Unincorporated community
- Location within Florida Location within the United States
- Coordinates: 28°00′31″N 81°54′27″W
- Country: United States
- State: Florida
- County: Polk
- Elevation: 141 ft (43 m)
- Time zone: UTC-5 (Eastern (EST))
  - Summer (DST): UTC-4 (EDT)
- ZIP code: 33840
- Area code: 863
- GNIS feature ID: 282052

Eaton Park is an unincorporated community in Polk County, Florida, United States. Eaton Park is located on U.S. Route 98, 3.3 miles (5.3 km) southeast of Lakeland, and also serves as the southern terminus of Florida State Road 659. Eaton Park has a post office with ZIP code 33840.
