= Southfort, Florida =

Unincorporated community in Florida, U.S.

Southfort is an unincorporated community in DeSoto County, Florida, United States, located approximately 1 mile (1.6 km) south of Fort Ogden on U.S. Route 17.

== Geography ==
It is located at 27°04′05″N 81°57′50″W, its elevation 26 feet (7.9 m).
