= Homeland, Florida =

- Census-designated place
- Location within Florida Location within the United States
- Coordinates: 27°49′05″N 81°49′37″W
- Country: United States
- State: Florida
- County: Polk

Area
  - Total: 0.42 sq mi (1.10 km^{2})
  - Land: 0.42 sq mi (1.10 km^{2})
  - Water: 0 sq mi (0.00 km^{2})
- Elevation: 144 ft (44 m)

Population (2020)
  - Total: 305
  - Density: 718.4/sq mi (277.37/km^{2})
- Time zone: UTC-5 (Eastern (EST))
  - Summer (DST): UTC-4 (EDT)
- ZIP codes: 33847
- Area code: 863
- FIPS code: 12-32250
- GNIS feature ID: 2583354

Homeland is an unincorporated community and census-designated place in Polk County, Florida, United States. As of the 2020 census, Homeland had a population of 305. It has a post office and a historical park. It is part of the Metropolitan Statistical Area of Lakeland–Bartow.

== History ==
Peace Creek (now Bartow, Florida) and Fort Meade were the two largest cities in Polk County. Homeland was a stop midway between them, and gradually began to attract settlers. The original settlement was called Bethel, but the name was changed to Homeland. A school and several churches were built in the area. The school was closed down in 1956 as Homeland became eclipsed by its neighbor to the north, Bartow. The school building is now part of Homeland Heritage Park, an educational park for elementary Polk County school children.

Homeland has one church: The First Baptist Church of Homeland. The pastor, Thomas Henry, has been the pastor since October 30, 2022.

== Geography ==
Homeland is located approximately six miles south of the center of Bartow.

== Demographics ==
Historical population
Census	Pop.	Note	%±
2020	305		—
U.S. Decennial Census

Homeland first appeared as a census designated place in the 2010 U.S. census.
