= Bowlegs Creek =

River in Florida, United States

Coordinates: 27.721539°N 81.790672°W

Bowlegs Creek is a stream in Polk County, Florida, in the United States.

Bowlegs Creek was named in honor of Billy Bowlegs, a Seminole chief.

== See also ==
- List of rivers of Florida
