= Florida State Road 676 =

State highway in Florida, United States

State Road 676
- Causeway Boulevard

Route information
- Maintained by FDOT
- Length: 3.189 mi (5.132 km)
- Existed: 1945–present

Major junctions
- West end: US 41 / US 41 Bus. near Tampa
- East end: US 301 near Brandon

Location
- Country: United States
- State: Florida
- Counties: Hillsborough

Highway system
- Florida State Highway System; Interstate; US; State; Former; Pre‑1945; Toll; Scenic
| ← SR 674 | → SR 678 |

State Road 676 (SR 676) is a short state highway running west and east southeast of Tampa, Florida. It is named Causeway Boulevard, and serves as a connecting route to U.S. Route 41 Business (US 41 Bus.). Causeway Boulevard extends further east as a non-State Road that crosses over Interstate 75 (I-75) and passes by the Westfield Brandon mall before it turns into Lumsden Road.

== Major intersections ==
The entire route is in Hillsborough County.

| Location | mi | km | Destinations | Notes |
|---|---|---|---|---|
| | 0.000 | 0.000 | US 41 / US 41 Bus. north (South 50th Street / Causeway Boulevard / SR 45 / SR 599 north) – Tampa, Port of Tampa, Gibsonton | |
| Clair-Mel City | 2.036 | 3.277 | To SR 618 (Selmon Expressway) / South 78th Street (CR 573) | |
| | 3.189 | 5.132 | US 301 (SR 43) to I-75 / SR 618 (Selmon Expressway) / Causeway Boulevard (CR 676 east) – Zephyrhills, Riverview | |
1.000 mi = 1.609 km; 1.000 km = 0.621 mi

== Related routes ==
=== County Road 676 ===
County Road 676
- Location: Palm River-Clair Mel-Mulberry

County Road 676 (CR 676) is a bi-county road in Hillsborough and Polk Counties, Florida, that is separated into two sections in Brandon, and are both former extensions of SR 676. The county segment, runs from U.S. Route 41 and Florida State Road 676 in Palm River-Clair Mel south of East Tampa and west of Brandon, and ends at Florida State Road 60 in western Mulberry.

The route continues east of U.S. Route 301, and the street name Causeway Boulevard continues along the county section of the route. The first moderate intersection along the way is that of South Falkenberg Road which leads to a partial diamond interchange with the Lee Roy Selmon Crosstown Expressway. The route then climbs a long bridge over Interstate 75 just south of the interchange with the Lee Roy Selmon Crosstown Expressway, but has no access to either of these roads. From this point the route passes by the southern extension of the Brandon Town Center shopping mall. At the intersection of Providence Road, Causeway Boulevard becomes West Lumsden Road, and at South Parsons Boulevard and John Moore Road, West Lumsden Road becomes East Lumsden Road. The last major intersection in Brandon is Lithia-Pinecrest Road (CR 640), and less than one block after this intersection, CR 676 makes a southeast turn onto Durant Road. Due to the close proximity between the intersections of Lithia-Pinecrest and Durant Road, as well as an obstructing median, westbound drivers along this route must turn east onto East Lumsden Road and then make a U-Turn at Collina Hill Place, the entrance to the La Collina gated community.

Durant Road carries CR 676 along a southeast to northwest trajectory until just before an intersection with a local street named Thames River Road, when it turns straight west to east. Along this segment, the road passes by the Mulrennan Middle School and later enters Durant, the road's namesake. While in the community, it crosses the former right-of-way of the Seaboard Air Line Railroad Sarasota Subdivision and the current CSX Valrico Subdivision. CR 676 makes a south turn onto Turkey Creek Road, crosses the Valrico Sub again, and then at the Durant High School, turns east again onto West Keysville Road. County Road 676 crosses the Valrico Sub for the third and last time in Hillsborough County as it enters Alafia where West Keysville Road becomes East Keysville Road at the intersection with South County Road 39, a bi-county southern extension of Florida State Road 39.

East Keysville Road road enters Keysville where it crosses the Plant City Subdivision then turns south to cross a winding bridge over the Alafia River. The route then turns east onto Nichols Road, while Keysville Road continues south to cross the Plant City Subdivision a second time and then the Valrico Subdivision until it finally ends as a dead end street south of Virgil Hall Road in Welcome. In the meantime, CR 676 continues east along Nichols Road. Hillsborough County Road 676 and Nichols Road briefly turn north along Carey Road for one block then turn back to the east again only to encounter another moderate intersection with South County Line Road where the route and the street name enter Polk County.

Immediately after crossing the county line, Polk County Road 676 makes a slight curve to the left then back to the right east of the intersection with Wood Road before crossing a bridge over Thirtymile Creek. Approximately afterwards is when it enters Nichols, the namesake for the street it has been traveling on since Keysville. Here the road encounters various strip-mining operations where it crosses the Valrico Subdivision once again, then a second time at the Nichols Post Office. One last bridge is encountered when CR 676 crosses the North Prong of the Alafia River along the north side of the Valrico Sub's own bridge over that river. The last intersection before the route terminates is named "Old Highway 60." Polk County Road 676 ends at Florida State Road 60 across from another section of Old Highway 60 in Mulberry.

=== Major intersections ===
| County | Location | mi | km | Destinations | Notes |
|---|---|---|---|---|---|
| Hillsborough | Palm River-Clair Mel | 0.0 | 0.0 | US 301 / SR 676 | Western terminus; continues as SR 676 |
| Hillsborough | Brandon | | | South Falkenberg Road | |
| Hillsborough | Brandon | | | Brandon Parkway; To SR 618 west | |
| Hillsborough | Brandon | | | Lithia Pinecrest Road (CR 640) | |
| Hillsborough | Brandon | | | East Lumsden Road | |
| Hillsborough | Durant | | | Turkey Creek Road | |
| Hillsborough | Alafia | | | CR 39 (South County Road 39) | |
| Polk | Nichols | | | County Line Road | |
| Polk | Nichols | | | Bridge over Thirtymile Creek | |
| Polk | Mulberry | | | SR 60 (Commonwealth Avenue North) / Lakeshore Drive | Eastern terminus; |
1.000 mi = 1.609 km; 1.000 km = 0.621 mi

=== County Road 676A ===
County Road 676A
- Location: near Palm River-Clair Mel-Bloomingdale

County Road 676A (CR 676A) is a suffixed county road in Hillsborough County, but has no connection to its parent route. It was formerly SR 676A.

The route begins east of U.S. Route 41, as Madison Avenue across from the entrance to the Port of Tampa. 0.2 miles (0.32 km) east of US 41 the route has a railroad grade crossing with the AZA Line section of the Tampa Terminal Subdivision. The county road starts out as a two-lane thoroughfare with a center-left turn lane. The center-left turn lane ends just before the intersections with Palm Drive and Companion Lane, when the turn lane is replaced by a second westbound lane. The road then curves to the southeast while 52nd Avenue South replaces Madison Avenue's trajectory. Before curving back to the east, the road becomes a four-lane divided highway.

The first moderate intersection along the way is that of South 78th Street (Hillsborough County Road 573) in Progress Village, where Madison Avenue ends and turns into Progress Boulevard. North of the street name transition South 78th Street has a partial cloverleaf interchange with Lee Roy Selmon Crosstown Expressway. The next moderately important intersection is South Falkenberg Road which leads to a partial diamond interchange with the Lee Roy Selmon Crosstown Expressway. Progress Boulevard takes a slight right curve to enter Riverview where it crosses over a bridge over Interstate 75, but has no access to that interstate. After turning back eastbound and becoming a four-lane divided highway, the road intersects U.S. Route 301, which does have access to I-75 north of the intersection. US 301 is also where Progress Boulevard ends and CR 676A continues onto Bloomingdale Avenue, which also runs along the border of Brandon and Riverview

East of the intersection with Gornto Lake and Duncan Roads CR 676A becomes a four-lane undivided highway. After the intersection with Buckhorn Springs Road, Bloomingdale Avenue becomes West Bloomingdale Avenue, which then passes over a bridge over Buckhorn Creek and the county road now runs along the border of Brandon and Bloomingdale. The intersection of John Moore Road is where West Bloomingdale Avenue becomes East Bloomingdale Avenue. A divider briefly reappears at Maze Lane, but then starts again just before the Bloomingdale Square Shopping Plaza and continues along the rest of the route well-past the intersection with Bell Shoals Road. Immediately after passing the Bloomingdale Sports Complex, Hillsborough County Road 676A ends at Lithia-Pinecrest Road (Hillsborough County Road 640). But Bloomingdale Avenue continues east towards the River Hills Masters housing development which has a right-of-way for an unbuilt continuation east of Lake Michela Boulevard and New River Hills Parkway.

=== Major intersections ===
The entire route is in Hillsborough County.

| Location | mi | km | Destinations | Notes |
|---|---|---|---|---|
| Palm River-Clair Mel | 0.0 | 0.0 | US 41 (Tamiami Trail) | Western terminus |
| Progress Village | | | CR 573 (South 78th Street) | |
| Progress Village | | | South Falkenberg Road | |
| Brandon | | | US 301 | |
| Bloomingdale | | | CR 640 (Lithia-Pinecrest Road) / East Bloomingdale Avenue | Eastern terminus |
1.000 mi = 1.609 km; 1.000 km = 0.621 mi
