= Valrico Subdivision =

CSX railroad line in Florida

CSX Transportation's Valrico Subdivision is a railroad line in Central Florida. It serves as CSX's main route through a region of Central Florida known as the Bone Valley, which contains the largest known deposits of phosphate in the United States. The 47-mile line runs from Valrico east to Bartow and south to Bowling Green.

Much of the Valrico Subdivision dates back to the early 1900s and was originally operated under the same name by the Seaboard Air Line Railroad, a CSX predecessor. Though, southernmost 12 miles of the line from Homeland to Bowling Green was previously operated by the Atlantic Coast Line Railroad, another CSX predecessor.

== Route description ==
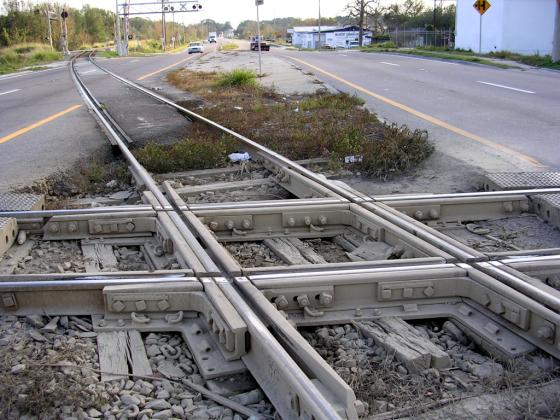
Crossing of the Valrico and Bone Valley Subdivisions in Mulberry. Diamond is located in the median of State Road 37.

The Valrico Subdivision begins at a junction with CSX's S Line (Yeoman Subdivision) in the community of Valrico. From Valrico, it runs in a straight line southeast to Welcome Junction, where it connects to the Plant City Subdivision. It continues east and comes to Edison Junction 1.5 miles later. At Edison Junction, the Brewster Subdivision splits from the line southeast while the Valrico Subdivision continues northeast to Nichols and east to Mulberry.

As the Valrico Subdivision enters Mulberry, it passes Mulberry Yard which is accessed via a wye across State Road 60. In the middle of Mulberry, it crosses the Bone Valley Subdivision at a crossing located in the median of State Road 37. On the east side of Mulberry, it connects with the Achan Subdivision at a wye to the south.

The Valrico Subdivision leaves Mulberry and continues east, paralleling State Road 60 to Bartow passing just to the north of Downtown Bartow. East of Bartow at Pembroke Junction, the Valrico Subdivision turns south and runs along U.S. Route 17 to Homeland and Fort Meade, before terminating in Bowling Green.

The Valrico Subdivision historically continued east of Pembroke Junction to Lake Wales, Alcoma, and Walinwa.

== Operation ==
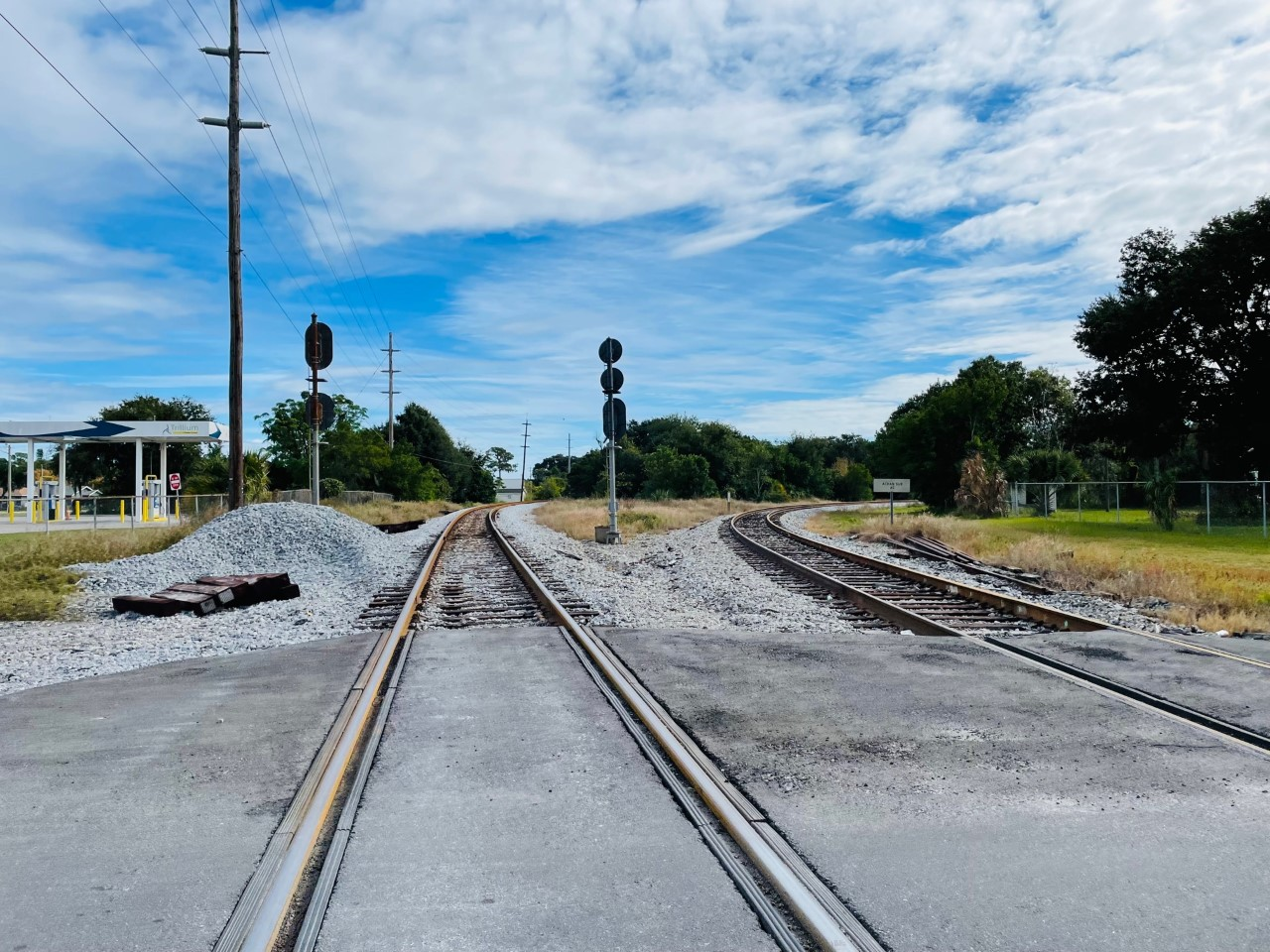
Valrico Subdivision's junction with the Achan Subdivision in Mulberry, Florida

The Valrico Subdivision is currently CSX's busiest rail line thorough Bone Valley and carries large amounts of phosphate traffic, its main commodity. The line is mostly dispatched by Track Warrant Control, though there is a small Centralized Traffic Control signal system around Mulberry between IMC and Ridgewood.

The line serves phosphate facilities operated by The Mosaic Company, which was created in 2004 after the merger of Cargill Inc. and IMC Global. The line serves Mosaic's processing facility at Ridgewood and previously served the Bonnie Mine just southeast of Mulberry. Mosaic's South Fort Meade Mine is located near the end of the Valrico Subdivision between Fort Meade and Bowling Green. Track between the entrance to South Fort Meade Mine and Bowling Green is out of service.

Both raw and processed phosphate from these facilities (as well as facilities on CSX's Brewster Subdivision and Bone Valley Subdivision) are transported on the line to Valrico, where they continue on the S Line west to Tampa and then transferred to ships at Rockport Yard in Tampa. Phosphate is also sent north from Mulberry to Winston Yard (on the Bone Valley Subdivision) to be sent via rail throughout the country.

== History ==
Valrico Subdivision

Overview
- Status: Still operating
- Owner: Seaboard Air Line Railroad
- Termini: Valrico, Florida; Walinwa, Florida

Technical
- Line length: 59.8 mi (96.2 km)
- Track gauge: 1,435 mm (4 ft 8 1/2 in) standard gauge
- Electrification: No
Route map
Active segments are shown in red and abandoned segments in dark red. (click to enlarge)

The 47 miles of track that are today the Valrico Subdivision were built incrementally from the late 1800s and early 20th century as the phosphate industry in Bone Valley began expanding.

=== Valrico to Bartow and Homeland ===
The Seaboard Air Line Railroad built the segment of the line from Welcome Junction to Nichols around 1905. It was built as an extension of the Plant City, Arcadia, and Gulf Railroad (which is today the Plant City Subdivision), which Seaboard had bought earlier that year. Seaboard extended the line east to Mulberry and Bartow in 1912 and spurs to various phosphate facilities were built as well.

In 1914, the Seaboard Air Line built track from just east of Bartow (at a point known historically as Pembroke Junction) south through Homeland to the now-defunct Coronet Pembroke Mine. By 1916, Seaboard would extend the line from Bartow (Pembroke Junction) east to Lake Wales, Alcoma, Hesperides, and Walinwa. Track south of Pembroke Junction then became known as the Pembroke Spur. At Walinwa, the line connected to the Kissimmee River Railway which continued east to Nalaca where it served a turpentine mill. Due to this extension, the junction with the Seaboard's main line in Plant City was named Lake Wales Junction (which the junction is still named today).

Seaboard built the Valrico Cutoff in 1925 which connected the Seaboard main line at Valrico with the track at Welcome Junction. The Valrico Cutoff was built to shorten the distance from Mulberry to Tampa by bypassing Plant City. Seaboard then designated the line from Valrico to Lake Wales and beyond as the Valrico Subdivision. The Valrico Cutoff also crossed Seaboard's Sarasota Subdivision at Durant which also shortened the distance from Tampa to Sarasota. The original track north to Plant City remained in service and was later considered a branch of the Valrico Subdivision.

Passenger service would also operate on the Valrico Subdivision. Seaboard would operate the Cross Florida Limited over the line, which was one of the first rail services to connect Tampa and Miami directly. The Cross Florida Limited ran from Tampa ran to Plant City before turning south to Welcome Junction. It then ran the Valrico Subdivision to West Lake Wales, where it continued down the Miami Subdivision (which was built in the 1920s). The Cross Florida Limited would also have passenger stops in Mulberry and Bartow. The Mulberry depot still stands and is now a phosphate museum.

=== Mergers ===
In 1967, the Seaboard Air Line Railroad merged with the Atlantic Coast Line Railroad to form the Seaboard Coast Line Railroad. In the Seaboard Coast Line era, the Valrico Subdivision continued to be designated on the line from Valrico east through Bartow and West Lake Wales. Track east of West Lake Wales was redesignated as the Lake Wales Subdivision. Track was removed between Bartow and West Lake Wales by 1982. Remaining track east of West Lake Wales is now operated by the Florida Midland Railroad.

In 1980, the Seaboard Coast Line's parent company merged with the Chessie System, creating the CSX Corporation. The CSX Corporation initially operated the Chessie and Seaboard Systems separately until 1986, when they were merged into CSX Transportation.

=== Homeland to Bowling Green ===
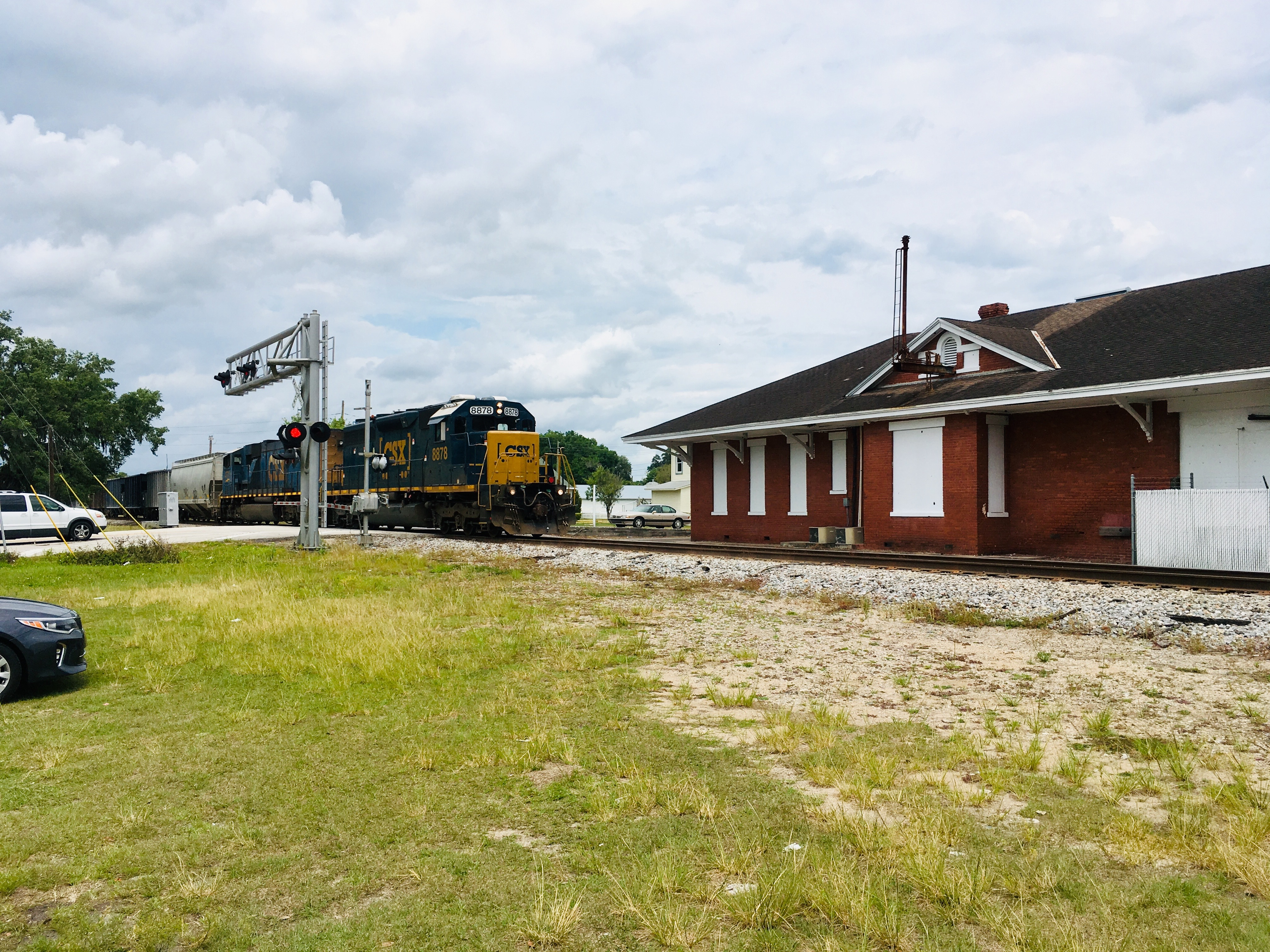
CSX train passing the Atlantic Coast Line's historic Fort Meade Depot (milepost AX 875.13) on the Valrico Subdivision.

Track from the Pembroke Spur in Homeland south to Bowling Green became part of the Valrico Subdivision in the 1980s. This segment was previously part of the Atlantic Coast Line Railroad's Lakeland—Fort Myers Line (later known as the Fort Myers Subdivision after the merger). This segment was built in 1886 by Atlantic Coast Line predecessor, the Florida Southern Railway, making it the oldest trackage of the current Valrico Subdivision. The Fort Myers Subdivision was abandoned north of Homeland and south of Bowling Green in the late 1980s with the remaining segment being annexed to the Valrico Subdivision. The Atlantic Coast Line's former passenger depot in Fort Meade still stands along the line, and the Bowling Green depot stands about a hundred yards south of the end of the track.

== Milepost numbers ==
Despite being a continuous line today, the milepost numbers on the Valrico Subdivision are not continuous throughout and remain as they originally were under predecessor companies (the Atlantic Coast Line and the Seaboard Air Line).

The segment from Valrico to Welcome Junction (the Valrico Cutoff) is numbered independently from the rest of the line since that was the last track segment to be built. It is numbered SZ 0.0 through SZ 11.8.

From Welcome Junction east to Bartow, the mileposts are numbered SV 834.2 through SV 851.1 (numbering which continues from the Plant City Subdivision). When the line turns south on to the former Seaboard Pembroke Mine spur in Bartow, the numbering continues with the prefix SVE since the SV prefix continued along the former east continuation to West Lake Wales.

In Homeland, where the line transitions to the former Atlantic Coast Line track, the mileposts abruptly change at approximately SVE 857.3 to AX 870.8 reflecting the Atlantic Coast Line numbering. The end of the line today is at milepost AX 882.7 in Bowling Green.

== Historic Seaboard Air Line stations ==
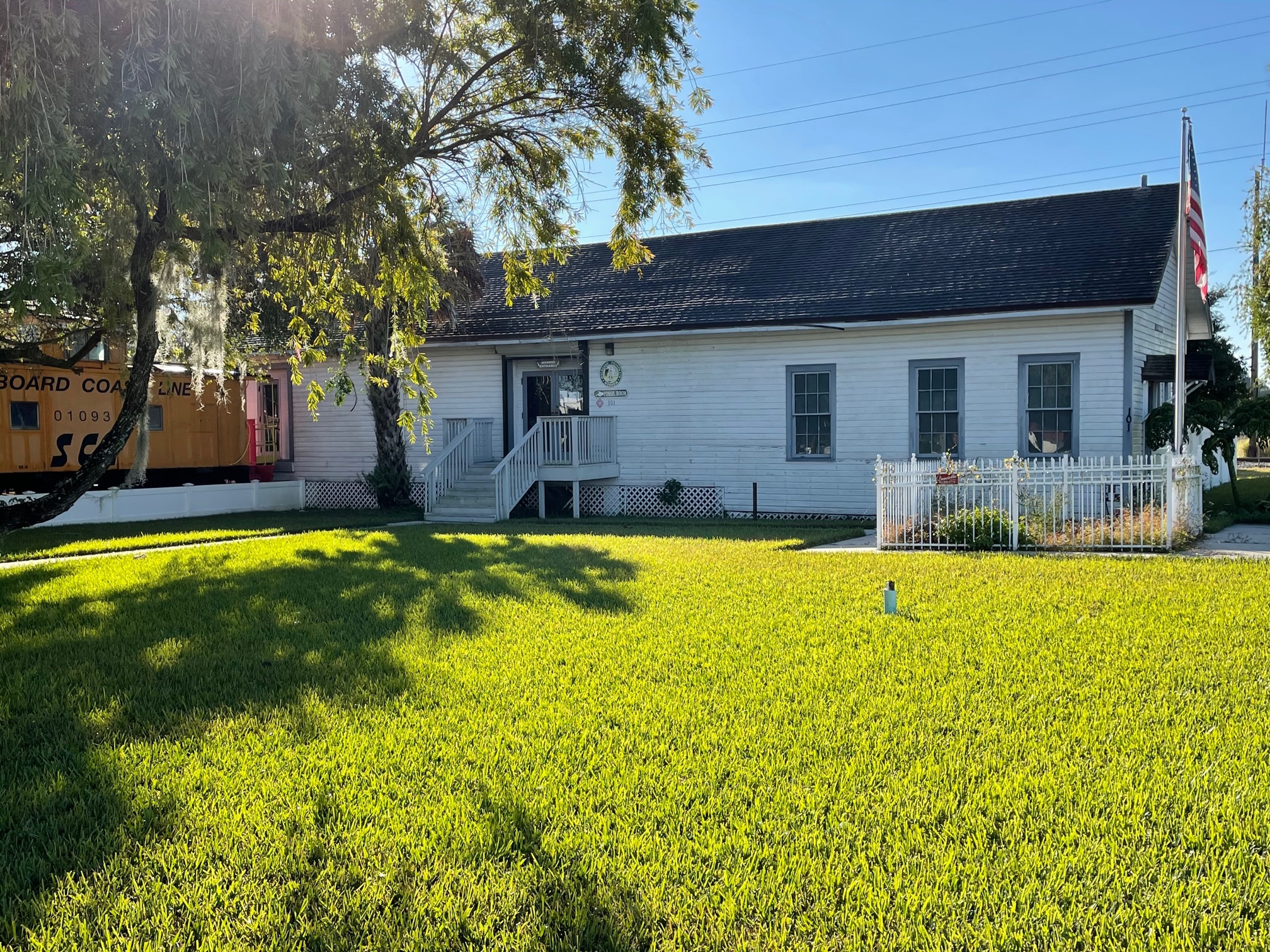
Seaboard Air Line passenger depot in Mulberry. The depot is now the Mulberry Phosphate Museum.

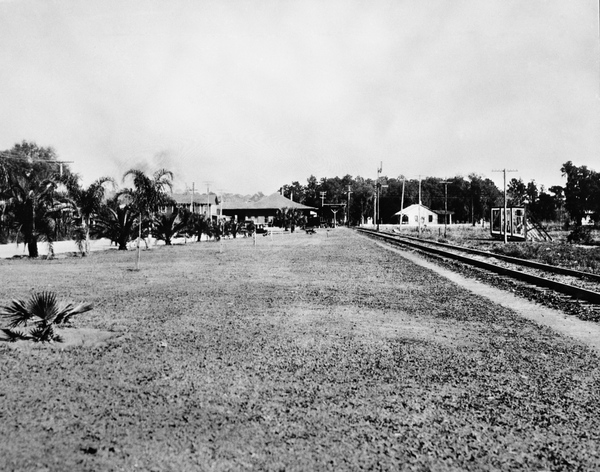
Former Bartow Union Station

Valrico to Walinwa
Milepost	City/Location	Station	Connections and notes
SZ 0.0	Valrico	Valrico	junction with Seaboard Air Line Railroad Main Line
SZ 5.2	Durant	Durant	junction with Seaboard Air Line Railroad Sarasota Subdivision
SZ 11.8; SV 834.2	Keysville	Welcome Junction	junction with Seaboard Air Line Railroad Plant City Branch
SV 835.8	Edison	Edison Junction	junction with Seaboard Air Line Railroad Boca Grande Subdivision
SV 838.9	Nichols	Nichols	
SV 840.9	Nichols	IMC	
SV 842.3	Mulberry	Mulberry	junction with Atlantic Coast Line Railroad Bone Valley Branch
SV 843.0	Mulberry	South Mulberry	junction with Achan Subdivision
SV 845.1		Royster Junction	junction with spurs to Bonnie and Royster Mines
SVM 845.9		Royster Mine	located on a spur
SVL 847.0		Bonnie Mine	located on a spur
SV 845.4	Ridgewood	Ridgewood	wye to phosphate processing plant
SV 850.1	Bartow	Bartow Union Station	junction with Atlantic Coast Line Railroad Lakeland—Fort Myers Line
SV 851.1		Pembroke Junction	junction with Pembroke Spur
SVE 857.3	Homeland	Homeland	located on Pembroke Spur connection to Atlantic Coast Line Railroad Lakeland—Fort Myers Line
SV 853.1		Conners	junction with Conners Spur
SVB 854.0		Conshall	located on Conners Spur
SV 855.4		Lake Garfield	
SV 858.6	Alturas	Alturas	
SV 863.5	West Lake Wales	West Lake Wales	junction with Seaboard Air Line Railroad Miami Subdivision
SV 867.4	Lake Wales	Lake Wales	junction with Atlantic Coast Line Railroad Haines City Branch
SVG 872.1		Mammoth Grove	located on a spur
SV 874.1	Alcoma	Alcoma	
SV 875.6	Hesperides	Hesperides	
SV 882.2		Walinwa	continues as Kissimmee River Railway
For stations south of Homeland on the current line, see Lakeland—Fort Myers Line

== See also ==
- List of CSX Transportation lines
- Main Line (Seaboard Air Line Railroad)
- Charlotte Harbor and Northern Railway
