= Plant City, Arcadia, and Gulf Railroad =

Railway line in Florida

- Route (click to enlarge)

Overview
- Dates of operation: 1898–1905
- Successor: Seaboard Air Line Railroad; Seaboard Coast Line Railroad; CSX Transportation

Technical
- Track gauge: 4 ft 8 1/2 in (1,435 mm) standard gauge
- Length: 11.4 miles

The Plant City, Arcadia, and Gulf Railroad was a railroad line that once operated from Plant City, Florida, south to Welcome, a distance of about 13 miles. The line remains in service today and is owned by CSX Transportation, which it operates as their Plant City Subdivision.

== History ==
The Plant City, Arcadia, and Gulf Railroad was first built as a logging railroad in 1898 by the Warnell Lumber & Veneer Company. It connected to the Florida Central and Peninsular Railroad in Plant City, which would become the main line of the Seaboard Air Line Railroad in 1900.

The Seaboard Air Line bought the Plant City, Arcadia, and Gulf Railroad in 1905. They rebuilt the line and incorporated it into their network as their Plant City Branch. Shortly after, the Seaboard built track from the line at Keysville (at a point that would then be known as Welcome Junction) east to Nichols where phosphate mines were located.

In 1908, Coronet Industries began mining phosphate just southeast of Plant City. The company built a phosphate processing plant there and a small town known as Coronet for workers to live. The Seaboard Air line built a spur from Coronet Junction to the plant.

In 1912, Seaboard extended the line's Nichols branch east to Mulberry and Bartow in 1912. The line would then be extended to Lake Wales by 1916. This led to the former Plant City, Arcadia, and Gulf Railroad's junction with the Seaboard's main line in Plant City being named Lake Wales Junction.

In 1916, Coronet's phosphate mining operation moved south from Coronet to a new mine near Hopewell, and the Seaboard built a spur to the mine there. Track south of Welcome Junction to Welcome was abandoned the same year.

In 1925, Seaboard built the Valrico Cutoff which ran from the former Plant City, Arcadia, and Gulf Railroad at Welcome Junction northwest to Valrico. The Valrico Cutoff and track east of Welcome Junction to Bartow and Lake Wales would then be designated as the Seaboard's Valrico Subdivision.

From 1926 to the 1940s, the Seaboard would designate the former Plant City, Arcadia, and Gulf Railroad as the northernmost segment of their Fort Myers Subdivision (which would overlap the Valrico Subdivision from Welcome Junction a short distance to Edison Junction, where Seaboard's track continued south and connected to Fort Myers at the time). The line was later classified as a branch of the Valrico Subdivision as traffic to Fort Myers declined.

By 1940, the line was still being used by Seaboard's local passenger trains to Boca Grande as well as their Cross Florida Limited (which ran from Tampa to Miami).

== Current operations ==
Through many mergers, the Seaboard Air Line Railroad network became part of CSX Transportation in 1980. Today, the former Plant City, Arcadia, and Gulf Railroad operates as CSX's Plant City Subdivision and still runs from Plant City to Welcome Junction.

At the north end, the Plant City Subdivision connects with CSX's S Line (former Seaboard main line) just south of Plant City Interlocking (where the S Line and A Line cross). The junction with the S Line towards Tampa is still known today as Lake Wales Junction (which references that this was once the Seaboard Air Line's access to Lake Wales despite the fact that the track no longer continues there). The Plant City Subdivision’s connection to the S Line in the northbound direction (which was relocated north of the A Line in the 1990s) is now known as Sandler Junction.

Today the only scheduled train on this line is a Local Switcher. South of Coronet the line is mostly unused. While trains once could run the line at 40 miles per hour, its speed limit has been reduced to 25 miles per hour to reduce maintenance costs.

== Historic Stations ==
Milepost	City/Location	Station	Connections and notes
SV 823.1	Plant City	Plant City	later known as Lake Wales Junction junction with Florida Central and Peninsular Railroad Tampa Division (SAL)
SV 825.6	Plant City	Coronet Junction	
SVA 827.1	Plant City	Coronet	located on a spur from Coronet Junction
SV 827.3	Hopewell Gardens	Trapnell	
SV 829.5	Hopewell	Hopewell	
SVD 832.0	Hopewell	Hopewell Mine	located on a spur
SV 831.6	Alafia	Alafia	
SV 833.5	Keysville	Keysville	
SV 834.2	Keysville	Welcome Junction	junction with Seaboard Air Line Railroad Valrico Subdivision
	Welcome	Welcome	

== See also ==
- List of CSX Transportation lines
