= Mulberry High School (Florida) =

Location
- One Panther Place (Northeast Fourth Circle); Mulberry, FL 33860; Mulberry, Florida; United States; 27°53′49″N 81°58′19″W

Information
- Type: Public
- Motto: Where today meets tomorrow's goals
- Established: 1914
- School district: Polk County Public Schools
- Principal: Michael Young
- Staff: 62.00 (FTE)
- Enrollment: 1,399 (2023-2024)
- Student to teacher ratio: 22.56
- Colors: blue white
- Mascot: Panther
- Information: +1-863-701-1104
- Website: mhs.polkschoolsfl.com

Mulberry High School (also referred to as Mulberry Senior High School) is a four-year public high school located in Mulberry, Florida, serving the city and surrounding areas.

== History ==
Mulberry's then-only public school began high school classes in 1907. In 1909 the first high school building was opened, which later became the elementary school. In 1914, a second high school was constructed; it was a two-story brick building with six classrooms and an auditorium, costing approximately $12,500.

In 1921, the first edition of the MHS yearbook was published, titled The Mulberry Tree in honor of the city's famed mulberry tree.

In 1922, land was donated for the construction of a new high school, on the east side of what is now Northeast First Avenue; construction was completed in 1924. Also in 1924, MHS began inter-school football play.

During the Great Depression, many schools cut their terms or lost their accreditation, and the state of Florida ran out of money, but MHS was able to stay open and retain accreditation thanks to taxes paid by area phosphate firms.

In 1955, the current school was constructed on 65 acres (260,000 m^{2}) of land given by Virginia-Carolina Chemical Corporation and International Minerals and Chemical Corporation; the old high school was converted to an elementary school, Purcell.

In summer of 2020 ground was broken on the baseball field to begin construction on a new 3-floor high school done in the architectural style known as International. The new school will feature computer labs, collaboration areas with alternative seating, a 3-bay automotive garage, a robotics lab, an engineering lab, a new gymnasium, a courtyard, and new security features. It was set to be completed by December 2021.

== Notable alumni ==
- John Vincent Atanasoff (1903–1995), 1920 graduate: Inventor of the electronic digital computer. Graduated after two years; in 1985, the school's computer center was named for him.
- Dedrick Dodge (b. 1967): safety in the National Football League from 1991-1998.
- Kenny Howes (b. 1970): musician
- Bob Murphy (b. 1943), 1962 graduate: Professional golfer and sportscaster.
- J. T. Ready (1973–2012), 1992 graduate: Notable neo-Nazi.
