= Pinecrest, Hillsborough County, Florida =

Unincorporated community in Florida, US

Pinecrest
- Unincorporated community
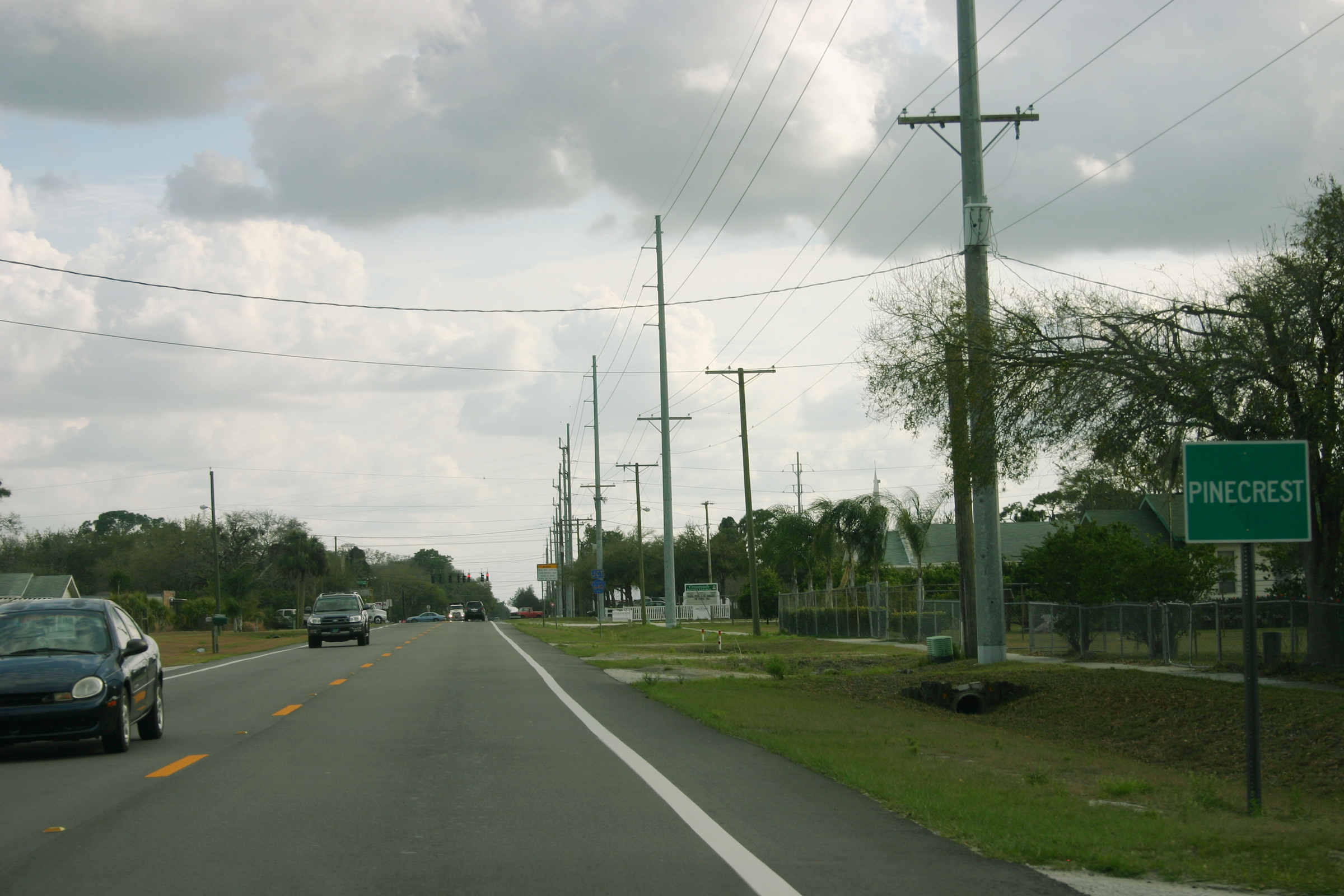
- Southbound Hillsborough CR 39 as it enters Pinecrest

- Location within the state of Florida
- Coordinates: 27°51′00″N 82°08′44″W
- Country: United States
- State: Florida
- County: Hillsborough
- Time zone: UTC-5 (Eastern (EST))
  - Summer (DST): UTC-4 (EDT)

Pinecrest, is an unincorporated community in southeastern Hillsborough County, Florida, United States, located at the intersection of Lithia-Pinecrest Road (Hillsborough County Road 640), and state highway 39.

== Education ==
In 1936, Keysville, Welcome, and Picnic joined together to form a school with grades one through nine, and one year later expanded to grades 1-12. The first graduating class was in 1938. Like many schools in the area, it began as a strawberry school, where the students attended during the summer months and took the winter months off to bring in the strawberry crop. The school burned in 1963, but was rebuilt and is currently in use as Pinecrest Elementary school. The high school closed in 1972, with the students being rezoned to either Brandon High School or East Bay High School Current students are zoned to Pinecrest Elementary, Randall Middle School and Newsome High School.

A strawberry school, its schedule accommodated agricultural work. Pinecrest High School won a star championship.
