= Palm River, Florida =

Unincorporated community in Florida, US

- Unincorporated community
- Location within Florida Location within the United States
- Coordinates: 27°56′31″N 82°23′49″W
- Country: United States
- State: Florida
- County: Hillsborough
- Time zone: UTC-4 (Central (CST))
  - Summer (DST): UTC-4 (EDT)

Palm River is an unincorporated community located in Hillsborough County, Florida, United States. It shares its name with the Palm River, a waterway sided with trail. Palm River boundaries include McKay Bay to the west, Tampa city limits to the north, the Clair Mel to the east, and Progress Village to the south.

The community is combined with Clair Mel to form the census-designated place of Palm River-Clair Mel.
