= Clair-Mel City, Florida =

- Unincorporated community
- Location within Florida Location within the United States
- Coordinates: 27°56′0″N 82°22′42″W
- Country: United States
- State: Florida
- County: Hillsborough

Area
  - Land: 0.64 sq mi (1.66 km^{2})
- Time zone: UTC-5 (Eastern (EST))
  - Summer (DST): UTC-4 (EDT)
- ZIP code: 33619
- Area code: 813
- GNIS feature ID: 301140

Clair-Mel City (Clair Mel) is an unincorporated community in Hillsborough County, Florida, United States. The community is combined with Palm River to form the census-designated place of Palm River-Clair Mel.

== History ==
On April 10, 1978, a three-way traffic collision in Clair-Mel City killed the driver of a tank truck and injured two other motorists. A cloud of ammonia gas escaped from the overturned truck, forcing several hundred people to evacuate.

In 2007, Kendrick Morris was wanted for the rape of an elderly woman at a Clair-Mel daycare center. He was arrested at the Bloomingdale Regional Public Library on April 29, 2008, after raping an 18-year-old who was returning her books to the library. He was sentenced to life in prison in March 2017.

== Geography ==
Clair Mel City is located at 27.93 North, 82.38 West (27.933359, -82.37821), or approximately 7 miles (11 km) east-southeast of Tampa. It is on Florida State Road 676.

== Description ==
Clair Mel boundaries include Palm River to the west, Tampa city limits to the north, the Lee Roy Selmon Expressway to the east, and Progress Village to the south.

== Education ==
Spoto High School serves the community.

== Notable people ==
- Sandy Amorós, MLB left fielder for the Los Angeles Dodgers and Detroit Tigers, lived here with the Germain family.
