= Mulberry, Florida =

- City
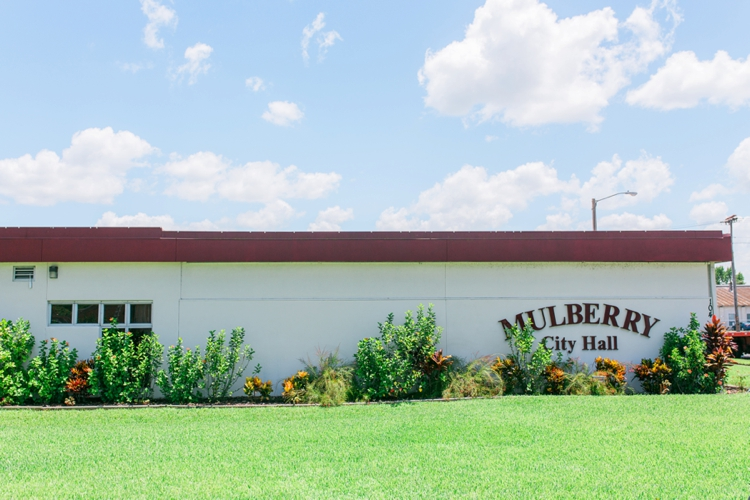
- Mulberry City Hall

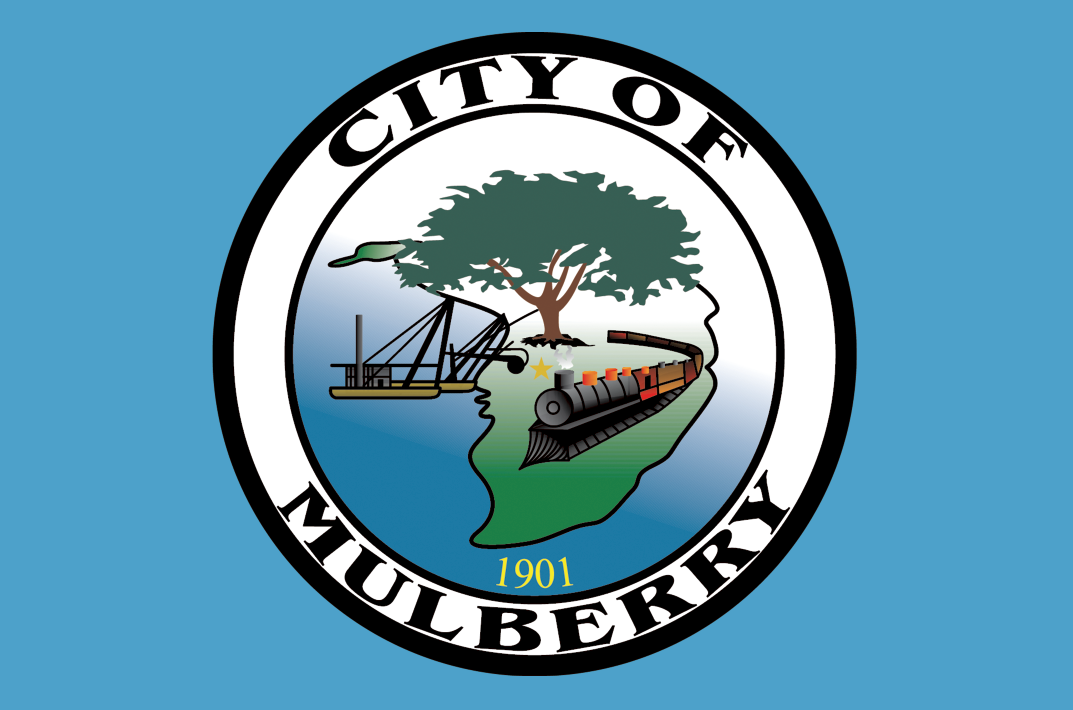
- Flag Seal
- Motto: "Official Phosphate Capital of the World"
- Location in Polk County and the state of Florida
- Coordinates: 27°54′35″N 81°58′09″W
- Country: United States
- State: Florida
- County: Polk
- Settled: c. 1840s
- Incorporated: February 12, 1901

Government
  - Type: Commission-Manager
  - Mayor: George H. Hatch
  - Vice Mayor: Neil Devine
  - Commissioners: Dawn McDonald, Rosa Ayersman, Collins Smith, and Kathy Barsotti
  - City Manager: Juana Ayala
  - City Clerk: Jenn Garcia

Area
  - Total: 6.88 sq mi (17.83 km^{2})
  - Land: 6.18 sq mi (16.01 km^{2})
  - Water: 0.70 sq mi (1.81 km^{2})
- Elevation: 112 ft (34 m)

Population (2020)
  - Total: 3,952
  - Density: 639.2/sq mi (246.79/km^{2})
- Time zone: UTC-5 (Eastern (EST))
  - Summer (DST): UTC-4 (EDT)
- ZIP code: 33860
- Area code: 863
- FIPS code: 12-47200
- GNIS feature ID: 2404336
- Website: www.cityofmulberryfl.org

Mulberry is a city in Polk County, Florida, United States. It is part of the Lakeland–Winter Haven metropolitan area, with parts of unincorporated Lakeland on its northern boundary. The population was 3,952 at the 2020 census. Mulberry is home to the Alafia River Reserve.

== History ==
The first non-indigenous settlers appeared in the Mulberry area in the 1840s. The first industry in Mulberry was logging the longleaf yellow pine which dominated the area.

The community had no official name at first, but the railroad which came through it stopped at a mulberry tree (morus rubra) to let off passengers and drop off the mail. The old mulberry tree became the de facto meeting place in the community, and eventually gave the community its name. Several lynchings and hangings took place from this mulberry tree. In 1886, phosphate rock was discovered in the Peace River, and the dominant logging industry gave way to mining operations. The phosphate industry gave Mulberry stability, leading to the City of Mulberry officially incorporating as a municipality on February 12, 1901. In 1910, Mulberry's Masonic lodge was established and remains operational today.

=== Florida Pebble Strike ===
By 1919, many miners had joined the International Union of Mine, Mill, and Smelter Workers. In April of that year, the union called a strike asking for a minimum wage and an eight-hour work day, after which the mining companies brought in strikebreakers from Georgia. Electricity was cut off from both Mulberry and Fort Meade. On the evening of August 21, 1919, four mine guards for the Prairie Pebble Phosphate Company opened fire upon the community in an apparent attempt to break the strike, claiming that a man had shot at the power house in which they were sheltered. During the indiscriminate shooting, two adults were wounded and a two-year-old child was killed after being shot through the heart. Later that night, another Black man was killed when the guards continued firing in Mulberry's Black neighborhood. The sheriff's investigation found no evidence of a firearm in the accused man's possession nor at the location from which it was claimed he had fired. After quelling the rage of the residents, who wanted to attack the power house and mine guards, the sheriff arrested the four mine guards shortly after midnight. This is how the city got its motto as the "official phosphate capital of the world".

=== Lynchings ===
The Ku Klux Klan maintained a presence in Mulberry, with the last public march occurring in 1979. At least six black people were lynched in the early 1900s, as well as at least one white man.

== Geography and climate ==
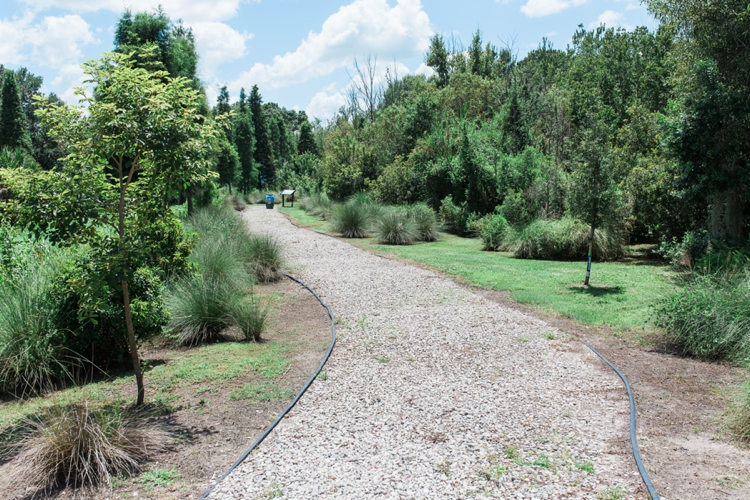
Mulberry Trail

According to the United States Census Bureau, the city has a total area of 3.2 square miles (8.3 km^{2}), of which 3.1 square miles (8.0 km^{2}) is land and 0.1 square mile (0.4 km^{2}) (4.36%) is water.

Mulberry is located within the Central Florida Highlands area of the Atlantic coastal plain with a terrain consisting of flatland interspersed with gently rolling hills.

Mulberry is located at the junction of state roads 60 and 37.

Mulberry is located in the humid subtropical climate zone of the (Köppen climate classification: Cfa).

== Demographics ==
Historical population
Census	Pop.	Note	%±
1910	1,418		—
1920	1,499		5.7%
1930	2,029		35.4%
1940	1,502		−26.0%
1950	2,024		34.8%
1960	2,922		44.4%
1970	2,701		−7.6%
1980	2,932		8.6%
1990	2,988		1.9%
2000	3,230		8.1%
2010	3,817		18.2%
2020	3,952		3.5%
2025 (est.)	4,573	▲	15.7%
U.S. Decennial Census

=== Racial and ethnic composition ===
Mulberry racial composition (Hispanics excluded from racial categories) (NH = Non-Hispanic)
Race	Pop 2010	Pop 2020	% 2010	% 2020
White (NH)	2,703	2,474	70.81%	62.60%
Black or African American (NH)	546	544	14.30%	13.77%
Native American or Alaska Native (NH)	9	10	0.24%	0.25%
Asian (NH)	19	21	0.50%	0.53%
Pacific Islander or Native Hawaiian (NH)	1	7	0.03%	0.18%
Some other race (NH)	4	8	0.10%	0.20%
Two or more races/Multiracial (NH)	47	132	1.23%	3.34%
Hispanic or Latino (any race)	488	756	12.78%	19.13%
Total	3,817	3,952		

=== 2020 census ===
As of the 2020 census, Mulberry had a population of 3,952. The median age was 46.0 years. 21.5% of residents were under the age of 18 and 26.6% of residents were 65 years of age or older. For every 100 females there were 86.9 males, and for every 100 females age 18 and over there were 84.8 males age 18 and over.

As of 2020, 92.4% of residents lived in urban areas, while 7.6% lived in rural areas.

In 2020, there were 1,687 households in Mulberry, of which 26.0% had children under the age of 18 living in them. Of all households, 40.2% were married-couple households, 18.9% were households with a male householder and no spouse or partner present, and 33.2% were households with a female householder and no spouse or partner present. About 32.4% of all households were made up of individuals and 19.1% had someone living alone who was 65 years of age or older.

In 2020, there were 1,936 housing units, of which 12.9% were vacant. The homeowner vacancy rate was 2.2% and the rental vacancy rate was 8.3%.

According to the 2020 American Community Survey 5-year estimates, there were 1,020 families residing in the city.

=== 2010 census ===
As of the 2010 United States census, there were 3,817 people, 1,547 households, and 1,009 families residing in the city.

=== 2000 census ===
As of the census of 2000, there were 3,230 people, 1,328 households, and 925 families residing in the city. The population density was 1,053.3 inhabitants per square mile (406.7/km^{2}). There were 1,611 housing units at an average density of 525.3 per square mile (202.8/km^{2}). The racial makeup of the city was 76.5% White, 20.0% African American, 0.2% Native American, 0.3% Asian, 1.7% other races, and 1.3% from two or more races. Hispanic or Latino of any race were 4.4% of the population.

In 2000, there were 1,328 households, out of which 25.0% had children under the age of 18 living with them, 50.0% were married couples living together, 15.6% had a female householder with no husband present, and 30.3% were non-families. 25.5% of all households were made up of individuals, and 14.4% had someone living alone who was 65 years of age or older. The average household size was 2.43 and the average family size was 2.87.

In 2000, in the city, the population was spread out, with 23.3% under the age of 18, 7.6% from 18 to 24, 22.3% from 25 to 44, 21.1% from 45 to 64, and 25.7% who were 65 years of age or older. The median age was 42 years. For every 100 females, there were 92.1 males. For every 100 females age 18 and over, there were 88.9 males.

In 2000, the median income for a household in the city was $28,247, and the median income for a family was $28,860. Males had a median income of $29,417 versus $20,965 for females. The per capita income for the city was $14,828. About 14.7% of families and 16.6% of the population were below the poverty line, including 32.2% of those under age 18 and 9.4% of those age 65 or over.

== Economy ==
The economy of Mulberry is dominated by phosphate mining. The Bone Valley is the world's most productive phosphate rock mining area. According to the Chamber of Commerce, Mulberry is the "Official Phosphate Capital of the World." The Mosaic Company operates the Nichols mine approximately two miles east of city. Mulberry is the home of Badcock Home Furniture, whose first store was opened in Mulberry in 1904 and which now extends to 382 stores throughout the southeast United States.

== Arts and humanities ==
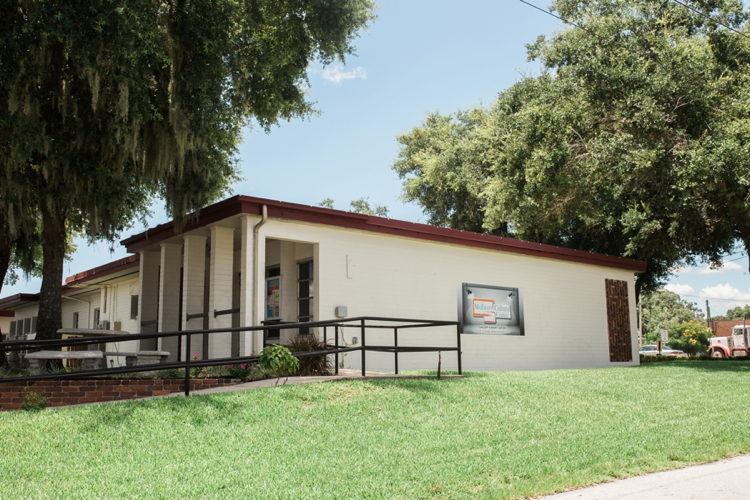
Mulberry Cultural Center

The Mulberry Cultural Center opened in the fall of 2015, and featured over 25 different art and humanities exhibits. It also hosts a variety of culturally enriching programs for all ages.

In 2018, the Mulberry Murals Initiative was founded to bring art to people of all backgrounds. These public art displays throughout the city have been commissioned by the City of Mulberry.

== Transportation ==
- SR 37, which leads north toward Lakeland and south toward Bradley Junction Two rail lines intersect in the middle of the highway about a half mile south of the intersection of SR 37 and SR 60
- SR 60, leading west toward Brandon and east toward Bartow and Lake Wales.
- Mulberry was served by two railroads. The line running east and west belonged to the Seaboard Airline Railroad while the north-south railroad belonged to the Atlantic Coast Line Railroad. There is a combined yard that belonged to both railroads to the west and north of Mulberry proper and this is where the railroad interchanged traffic rather than at interchanges at the crossing of the two lines south of the downtown area. The crossing of the two railroads is very unusual as it takes place in the middle of a 4-lane divided highway crossing of traffic on State Road 37 at SW 2nd Street. Both of these railroad lines merged into the Seaboard Coastline in 1967, and in turn, were folded into the CSX Railroad in 1986. Considerable traffic was and still is generated by the Bone Valley phosphate industry

== Education ==
Public schools in Mulberry are operated by the Polk County School Board.

The three public elementary schools in the area:

- Kingsford Elementary School
- Purcell Elementary School
- Sikes Elementary School

Mulberry Middle School and Mulberry High School were also public schools located within Mulberry.

Mulberry Christian Academy is a private elementary school where financial aid is available to families who qualify.

== Library ==
The Mulberry Public Library is a member of the Polk County Library Cooperative. The library is located at 905 NE 5th Street, Mulberry, FL 33860. It offers a variety of resources including video games, books, DVDs, audio-books, CDs, and digital materials. The library also hosts a number of programs for the community.

== Media ==
Mulberry is part of the Tampa–St. Pete television market, the 13th largest in the country and part of the local Lakeland-Winter Haven radio market, which is the 94th largest in the country.

== Sinkholes ==
On June 15, 1994, a sinkhole appeared in a toxic waste disposal pond near the city of Mulberry. Phosphogypsum, the byproduct of the phosphate fertilizer industry, is highly toxic and mildly radioactive. The 110 feet wide and 200 feet deep sinkhole dumped this toxin into caves that lead to the Floridan Aquifer. Drinking water for over ten million Florida residents comes from this aquifer. The company mining the phosphate, IMC-Agrico, now a part of The Mosaic Company, started the sinkhole remediation process immediately. It has spent over $6 million trying to repair the damage to the Florida water supply.

On August 27, 2016, the Mosaic Company discovered a giant sinkhole under a gypsum stack. Over 200 million gallons of water contaminated with phosphogypsum disappeared into its 45-foot-wide maw.

== See also ==
- Mulberry (uranium alloy)
