= Dedrick Dodge =

American football player and coach (born 1967)

No. 33
- Position: Safety

Personal information
- Born: June 14, 1967 (age 59); Neptune, New Jersey, U.S.
- Listed height: 6 ft 2 in (1.88 m)
- Listed weight: 184 lb (83 kg)

Career information
- High school: East Brunswick (East Brunswick, New Jersey); Mulberry (Mulberry, Florida)
- College: Florida State
- NFL draft: 1990: undrafted

Career history
- Seattle Seahawks (1990)*; London Monarchs (1991); Seattle Seahawks (1991–1992); London Monarchs (1992); San Francisco 49ers (1994–1996); Denver Broncos (1997); Carolina Panthers (1998)*; San Diego Chargers (1998)
- * Offseason or practice squad member only

Awards and highlights
- 2× Super Bowl champion (XXIX, XXXII)

Career NFL statistics
- Tackles: 74
- Interceptions: 5
- Fumble recoveries: 1
- Stats at Pro Football Reference

Dedrick Allen Dodge (born June 14, 1967) is an American former professional football player who was a safety for eight seasons in the National Football League (NFL) from 1991 to 1998. He played college football for the Florida State Seminoles. Dodge is a two-time Super Bowl champion. He played in Super Bowl XXIX for the San Francisco 49ers and in Super Bowl XXXII for the Denver Broncos. He also played for the London Monarchs in the inaugural season of the World League of American Football (WLAF); London won the first World Bowl that year, meaning that Dodge has three pro football championship rings. After his playing career, he became a coach.

Dodge played high school football at East Brunswick High School in East Brunswick, New Jersey and Mulberry High School in Mulberry, Florida.

Dodge spent two seasons as the head football coach at Mulberry Senior High School. According to The Ledger of Lakeland, Dodge previously coached a year at Evangel Christian in Lakeland, Florida, leading the team to an 11–3 record and a state title in 2005. He then coached a year at Victory Christian after Evangel folded and led the Storm to a 10–4 record with some of Evangel's former players.

Victory finished state runner-up in 2005, losing to Tallahassee FAMU in the 1B state title game. Dodge has returned to his home in Locust Grove, Georgia, about 30 miles south of Atlanta, where he maintained a home in Georgia since 2007 after he began coaching at Fort Valley State University as an assistant. Dodge previously coached in Polk County at Victory Christian, Mulberry and Evangel Christian, where he won a state title in 2005.

In 2022, Dodge would move out of Georgia and would become the safeties coach at Grambling State, where he has remained in that position.
