= Bone Valley =

Phosphate-producing region in Central Florida

Coordinates: 27.9175°N 81.7136°W

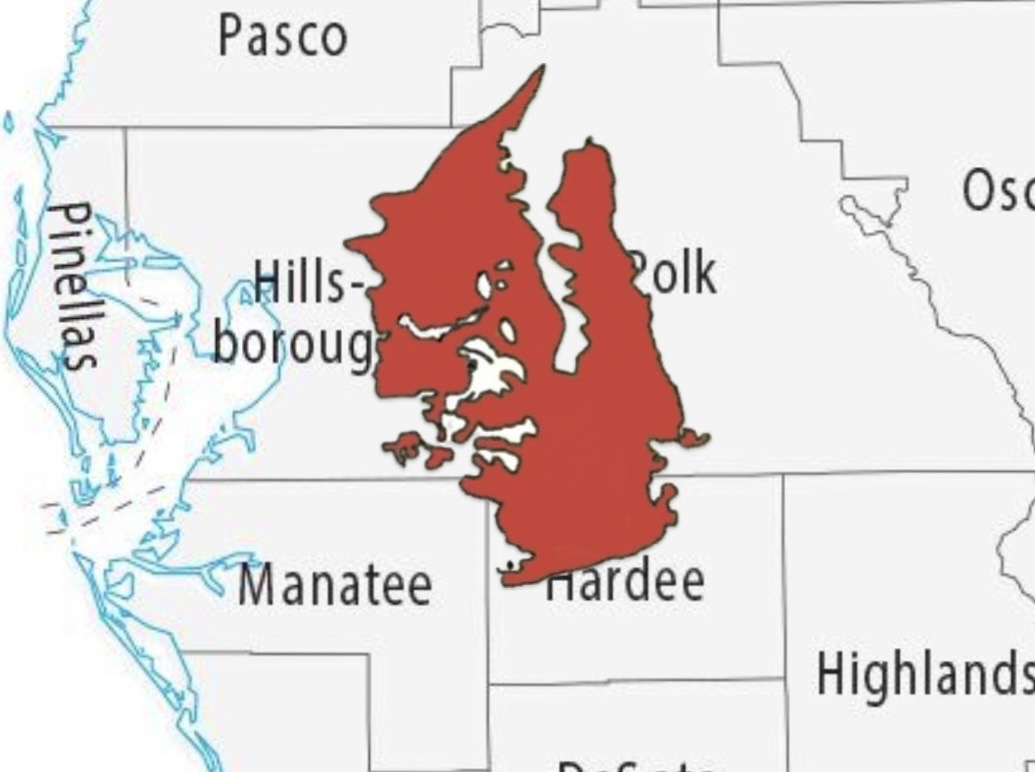
A Map Showing The Geological Formation Of Bone Valley.

The Bone Valley is a region of central Florida, encompassing portions of present-day Hardee, Hillsborough, Manatee, and Polk counties, in which phosphate is mined for use in the production of agricultural fertilizer. Florida currently contains the largest known deposits of phosphate in the United States.

== Process ==
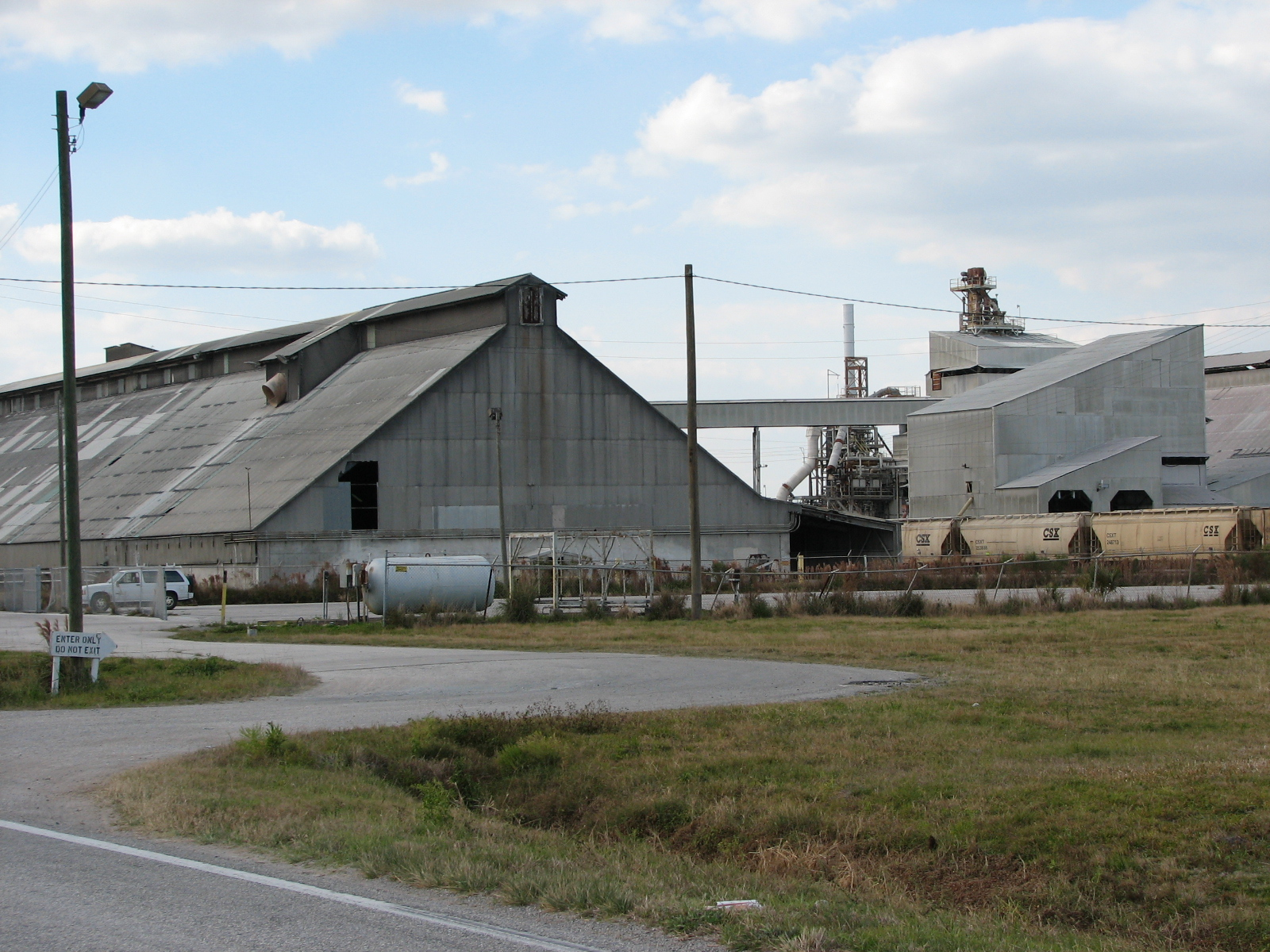
Phosphate fertilizer processing plant -- Nichols, Florida.

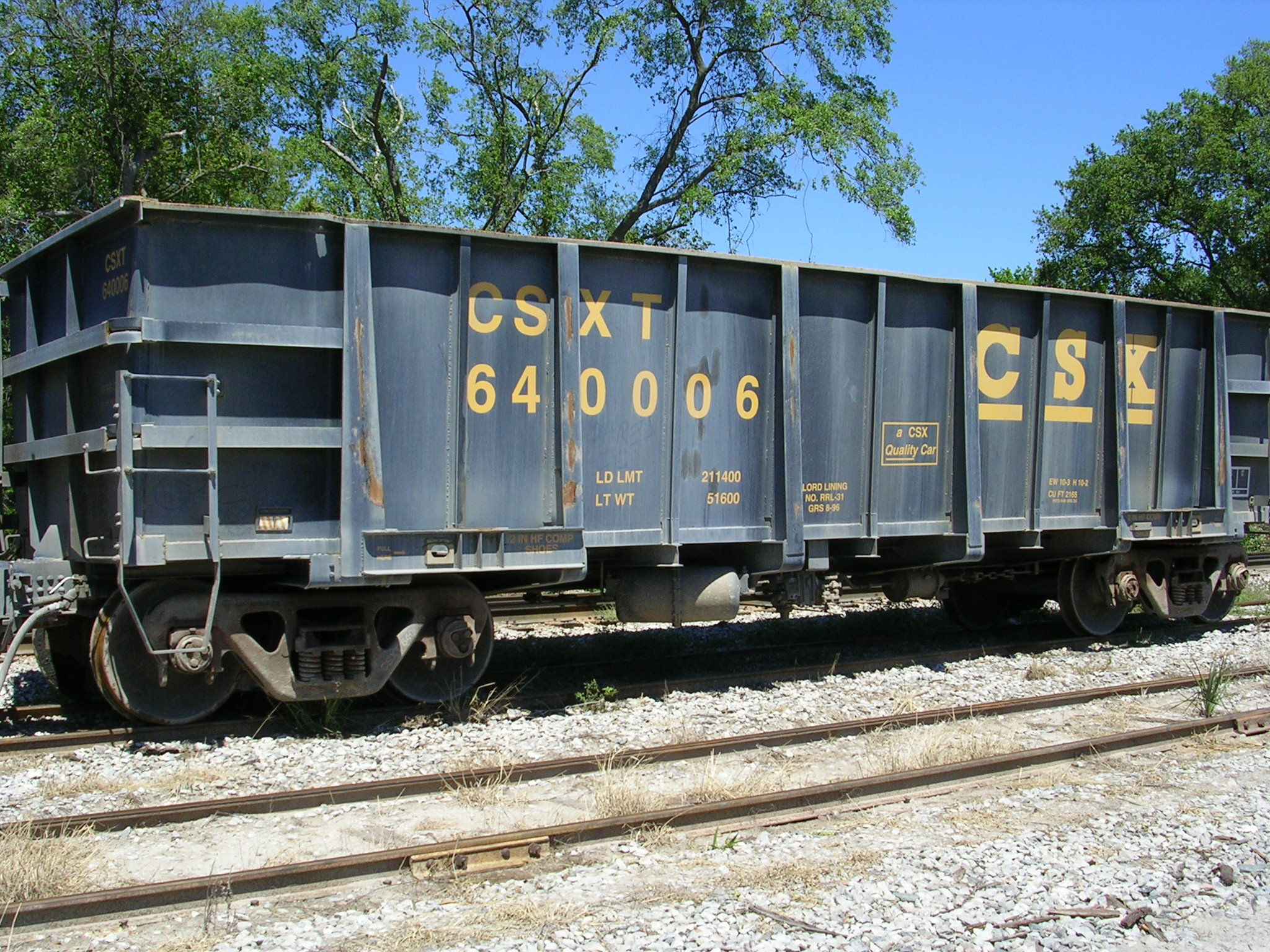
Rotary gondolas such as these are used by CSXT to transport phosphate rock from the Bone Valley region to transloading facilities along Tampa Bay -- Edison, Florida.

Large walking draglines, operating twenty-four hours a day in surface mines, excavate raw pebble phosphate mixed with clay and sand (known as matrix). The matrix contains a number of chemical impurities, including naturally occurring uranium at concentrations of approximately 100 ppm.

The matrix is then dropped into a pit where it is mixed with water to create a slurry, which is then pumped through miles of large steel pipes to washing plants. These plants crush, sift, and separate the phosphate from the sand, clay, and other materials, and mix in more water to create a granular rock termed wetrock. The wetrock, which is typically of little use in raw form, is then moved largely by rail to fertilizer plants where it is processed. The final products include, but are not limited to, diammonium phosphate (DAP), monoammonium phosphate (MAP) and trisodium phosphate (TSP).

Waste byproducts are stored in large phosphogypsum stacks and settling ponds, often hundreds of acres in size, and up to 200 feet (60.96 m) tall. Because this phosphogypsum is slightly radioactive, its use is banned in most situations.

Phosphate processing produces significant amounts of silicon tetrafluoride and hydrogen fluoride gas, which must be treated by filtering through special scrubbers.

Much of the final product (known within the industry as 'dryrock') is transported by rail to facilities along Tampa Bay, where they are transloaded onto ships destined for countries such as China. Port Tampa Bay handled 3.9 million tons of phosphate in 2021, though this figure represents a decline from 8 million tons in 2017.

Phosphate product intended for domestic use is assembled into unit trains of covered hopper cars for northbound movement.

== History ==
When the narrow gauge Florida Southern Railway reached Arcadia in 1886, it was a sleepy little town and the builders paused only briefly before pushing the railroad south to Punta Gorda. Unknown to the railroad and the general public at this time, a great discovery had been made in 1881 by Captain Francis LeBaron of the United States Army Corps of Engineers, who was surveying the lower Peace River area for a canal to connect the headwaters of the Saint Johns River to Charlotte Harbor. Here he found and shipped to the Smithsonian Institution nine barrels of prehistoric fossils from the sand bars prevalent on the lower Peace River. He also noticed that there was a phosphatase quality to the fossils and the deposit they were found in was very valuable. The Smithsonian wanted him to return and lead an expedition for prospecting more fossils, but Captain LeBaron was unable to return due to important duties at Fernandina where he was put in charge of harbor improvements.

In December 1886, LeBaron returned to the Peace River where he dug some test pits and sent the samples to a laboratory for analysis. The tests showed high quality bone phosphate of lime. LeBaron tried to interest investors in New York, Boston and Philadelphia, but none would invest in the project. Frustrated, he left the United States for the ill-fated Nicaraguan Canal Project.

The test results became known to Colonel G.W. Scott who owned the G.W. Scott Manufacturing Co. of Atlanta and he sent a representative to Arcadia who made several large purchases along the Peace River. Colonel T.S. Moorhead of Pennsylvania, who had also learned about the deposits from Captain LeBaron, but not the secret of their location, traveled to Arcadia where he stumbled onto the famous sand bars. Mr. Moorhead formed the Arcadia Phosphate Company, with the Scott Mfg. Co. quickly agreeing to purchase the entire output. The first shipment of Florida phosphate was made in May 1888 when the first ten car loads were dispatched to Scott's Fertilizer Works in Atlanta, Georgia. Soon after, G.W. Scott formed the Desoto Phosphate Co. at Zolfo where the Florida Southern Railway crossed the Peace River. The biggest player was the Peace River Phosphate Company (formed in January 1887) which was located in Arcadia by M.M. Knudson of New York and they built a narrow gauge railroad from the works on the river to the interchange with the Florida Southern. This company and its railroad were the first direct ancestor of the future Charlotte Harbor & Northern. The Peace River Phosphate Co. began mining in the Winter of 1889, and most of the ore was shipped to Punta Gorda via the Florida Southern, where it was loaded onto ships for export to Europe.

Early mining was with pick and shovel where the above-water sand bars were mined by hand. The material was carried on barges to the nearby drying works. Soon suction dredges were employed and the mining spread along the lower Peace River.

Moorhead soon sold his Arcadia Phosphate Co. to Hammond & Hull of Savannah, Georgia a large fertilizer operation in that city. Moorhead returned to Pennsylvania, where he developed a phosphate mine in Juniata County, PA and formed the narrow gauge Tuscarora Valley Railroad. Hammond & Hull also owned the Charlotte Harbor Phosphate Co. which had their works at Hull, connecting with the Florida Southern by a short branch line. To connect the two plants, Hammond & Hull built a narrow gauge railroad between Arcadia and Hull circa 1890. The railroad served various load-outs along the river, where the barges carrying pebble were unloaded into ore cars for the journey to the drying plants at Arcadia and Hull. Hammond dropped out around 1890 and the new firm was known as Comer & Hull.

The Peace River Phosphate Co. had built a narrow gauge railroad north of Arcadia to their load-outs along the Peace River. Like the Comer & Hull operations, the ore was hauled to the drying plant at Arcadia where it was loaded into the narrow gauge boxcars of the Florida Southern. When the railroad converted its Charlotte Harbor Division to standard gauge in 1892, both the Peace River Phosphate Co. and Comer & Hull operations converted their respective railroads. Joseph Hull of Comer & Hull purchased 50% interest in the Peace River Phosphate Co. about this time.

In December 1894, Joseph Hull consolidated the Arcadia Phosphate Co., Charlotte Harbor Phosphate Co., Desota Phosphate & Mining Co. & Peace River Phosphate Co. into the Peace River Phosphate Mining Co.

Peter Bradley of New York was one of the fertilizer capitalists (Bradley Fertilizer Co.) that Captain LeBaron had first approached about the sand bars. In May 1899, he was involved in the merger of 22 fertilizer companies into the American Agricultural Chemical Co., becoming vice president and a director of the new corporation.

AACC began buying the stock of the Peace River Phosphate Mining Co. from June 1899 until January 1902.

The Peace River Phosphate Mining Company Railroad consisted of a mainline running south from Arcadia to Liverpool. A few short branches connected the railroad to the Florida Southern (later the Plant System in 1896 and the ACL after 1902) at Arcadia, Hull and Liverpool. At Hull sand was removed by a washing plant. Liverpool housed the drying plant and barge loading facilities. A branch running north for about 3 miles (4.8 km) upstream from Arcadia served many load-outs along the river.

In the early years, phosphate from the Peace River area was barged to Punta Gorda, or shipped by rail to Port Tampa. Other important ports were later established at Seddon Island, Boca Grande, and Rockport.

Today Mosaic Inc. mines the area exclusively and is seeking to mine properties further south, in Hardee and Manatee Counties.

With renewed interest in corn-based ethanol fuel, the demand for fertilizer is expected to increase.

== Rail service ==
Throughout most of the 20th century, the Bone Valley region received service from two major railroads, the Atlantic Coast Line and Seaboard Air Line. Many plants and mines were served by both railroads, such as the Ridgewood facility located at Bartow, and the massive Pierce complex south of Mulberry. In the 1967 Seaboard Coast Line merger the rivalry was ended, SCL was later absorbed into CSX Transportation.

== Risks of mining ==
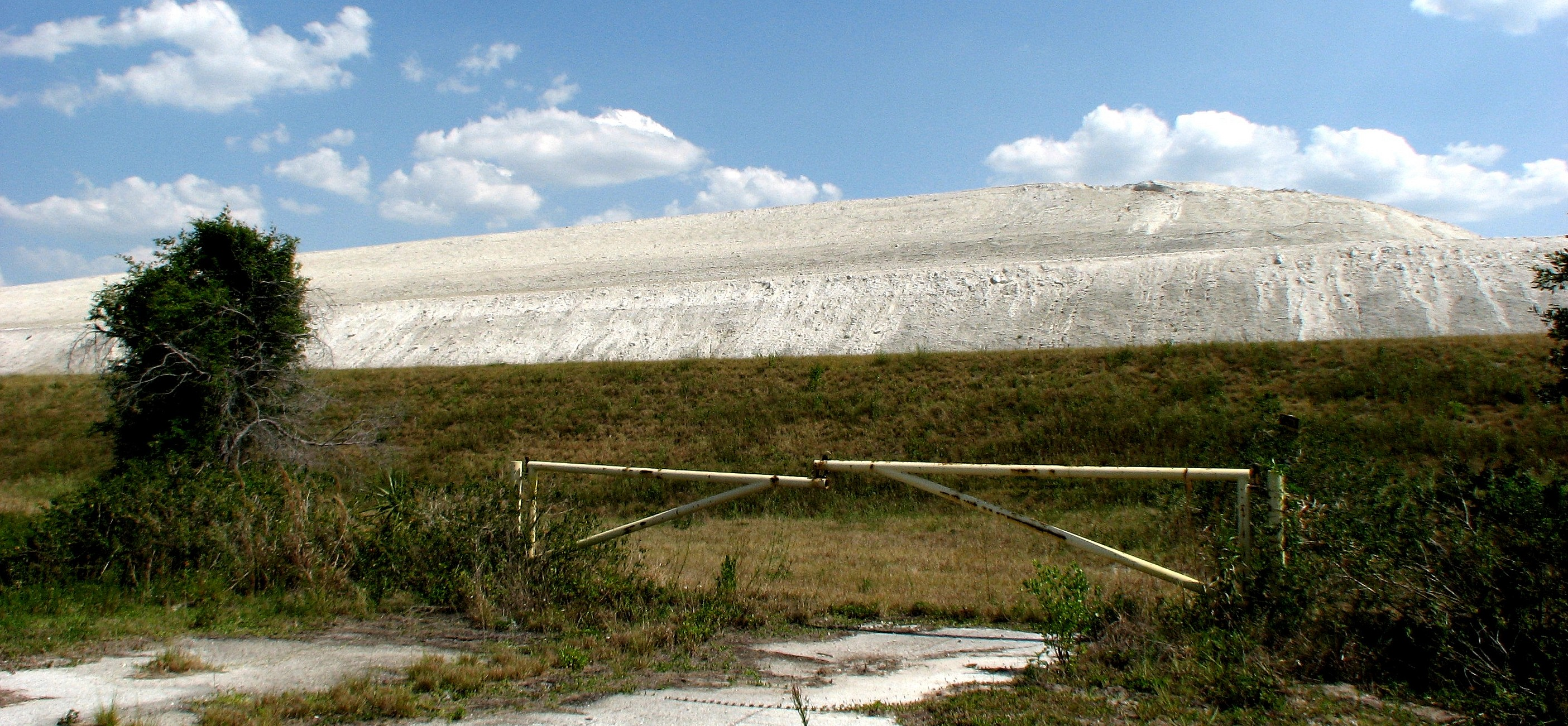
Phosphogypsum stack located near Fort Meade, Florida. These contain the waste byproducts of the phosphate fertilizer industry.

Phosphate is a declining export to China. Previously, significant amounts of rock were shipped to China, where it was processed into phosphate fertilizer. The majority of phosphate mining in Florida is done in the Peace River watershed. Phosphate mining companies use draglines to remove surface soils up to 60 feet (18 m) deep over thousands of contiguous acres. Once land is mined, state law requires that it be reclaimed. Wetlands are reclaimed on an acre for acre, type for type basis. Most modern mining permits actually require companies to recreate more wetlands than were initially present on the land. More than 180,000 acres (728 km^{2}) have already been mined and reclaimed in the Peace River watershed. As reserves in the northern portion of the bone valley are depleting, mining companies are now seeking permits for another 100,000 acres (405 km^{2}), which will replace reclaimed mines to the north.

One byproduct of the extraction process is clay, which is stored in settling ponds and eventually comprises 30%-40% of a mine site. Some of these ponds can measure thousands of acres. Rain drains slower through these clay-laden ponds than typical soil. Critics argue that this, in turn, reduces baseflow to the Peace River. Some studies have indicated that reclaimed lands actually provide a more consistent baseflow because the sandier soils of the reclaimed land provide faster baseflow, while the clay provides a slower steady flow, creating more flow during dry periods than native land. Since the 1960s, the average annual flow of the middle Peace River has declined from 1,350 cubic feet (38.23 m^{3}) to 800 cubic feet (22.65 m^{3}) per second (38.23 to 22.65 m^{3}/s).

Each holding pond has been perceived as a risk that threatens water quality, public health, wildlife, and the regional economy. Dams restraining the ponds have overflowed or burst, sending a slurry of clay into the river, and coating the riverbed for many miles with a toxic clay slime that suffocates flora and fauna. One such incident in 1971 killed over three million fish when 2 million US gallons (7,600 m^{3}) of phosphate waste swept into the river, causing an estimated 5-foot-tall (1.5 m) tide of slime that spread into adjacent pastures and wetlands. Since the 1971 spill, clay settling areas are now constructed as engineered dams.

In 2004, during Hurricane Frances, a phosphogypsum stack was overwhelmed by hurricane rains and the levees were breached, sending over 18,000 US gal (68,137 L) of acidic process water into Tampa Bay. Cargill Crop Nutrition, who owned the stack, added lime into the affected areas in an attempt to neutralize the highly-acidic runoff. Due to the extraordinary amount of runoff created by the hurricane, the spill was quickly diluted and environmental damage was minimal. In a consent agreement with the Department of Environmental Protection, Cargill greatly increased its water treatment capacity at the facility. The facility is a no discharge facility and was overwhelmed by the above normal rainfall in 2004, in addition to being affected by three hurricanes.

On occasion, clay slime spills have prevented the Peace River Manasota Water Supply Authority from using river flows for drinking water, forcing municipalities to seek water supplies elsewhere, or rely on stored supplies. On several occasions, the effects of heavy rainfall have created sinkholes beneath the settling ponds.

In August 2016, a sinkhole opened up under a gypsum stack at the Mosaic’s New Wales fertilizer plant in Mulberry, Florida. 215 million gallons of containment water dumped into the Floridan Aquifer.

Most recently in March 2021, millions of gallons of industrial wastewater from the former Piney Point fertilizer processing plant in Manatee County was released into Tampa Bay in response to the facility’s second leak in a decade. DEP permitted the controlled release into the SeaPort Manatee waters in Manatee Harbor to prevent such a failure. Environmental advocates are concerned about the effect that releasing nutrient-rich water once again will have on wildlife in Tampa Bay, and if red tide blooms, over the potential for economic impact.

== See also ==
- Bone Valley Formation - fossil site
- Phosphate mining in the United States
- Mulberry (uranium alloy)
