= Alafia River Reserve =

River in Florida, United States

- IUCN category IV (habitat/species management area)
- Location within Florida
- Location: Polk County, Florida, US
- Nearest city: Mulberry, FL
- Coordinates: 27.9178°N 82.0371°W
- Area: 334 acres (135 ha)
- Governing body: Southwest Florida Water Management District
- Website: Official website

The Alafia River Reserve is a recreation area and water conservation area managed by the Southwest Florida Water Management District in Mulberry, Florida, Polk County, Florida. It covers 334 acres (1.35 km^{2}) and is located at 4872 Indian Oak Drive in Mulberry, Florida. It was created to preserve wetlands and includes hiking trails and a picnic area.
