= Liverpool, Florida =

Coordinates: 27.044°N 81.985°W

Liverpool
- Ghost Town
- Interactive map of Liverpool
- Country: United States
- State: Florida
- County: De Soto County, Florida
- Founded: 1880

Liverpool is a former settlement and ghost town in DeSoto County, Florida, United States, situated along the Peace River. During the late 19th century, Liverpool developed as a transportation and commercial centre associated with phosphate mining in the Peace River region. The settlement served as a shipping point for phosphate transported by rail and river barges. Liverpool declined in the early 20th century as local phosphate operations diminished and transportation routes shifted towards other communities.

== History ==
Liverpool was a phosphate mining town in Florida and was named for its founder, John Cross, from Liverpool, England. Liverpool was most likely chosen because it was on the Peace River, which provided a way that mined phosphate could be transported to Charlotte Harbor. A second reason why it was chosen because it was at the Peace River Mining Company Railroad's southernmost tip and could be shipped down the river with barges. The town was founded in 1880 and was platted, after phosphate had been discovered in the region. Its founder had envisioned the town being a major center of commerce. He operated the town's general store and J. E. Riley oversaw the town's mining operations, served as its mayor and served as a local sheriff. The town in its heyday had docks along the river, post office, hotel, newspaper and a stage shop. After this, John Cross decided to buy and develop land in Charlotte County. The town's postal service was discontinued in 1895, in the same year a map was made of Charlotte County and showed the town on the Peace River. In 1905, the area started to run out of phosphate and the town began to decline. The railroad was soon extended further south to Punta Gorda and Boca Grande, making its decline much faster and commerce was starting to shift to Fort Ogden and by the 1920s it was completely gone.

== See also ==
- Bone Valley
