= Palm River-Clair Mel, Florida =

- Census-designated place
- Location in Hillsborough County and the state of Florida
- Coordinates: 27°55′26″N 82°22′18″W
- Country: United States
- State: Florida
- County: Hillsborough

Area
  - Total: 11.69 sq mi (30.27 km^{2})
  - Land: 11.43 sq mi (29.61 km^{2})
  - Water: 0.25 sq mi (0.65 km^{2})
- Elevation: 16 ft (4.9 m)

Population (2020)
  - Total: 26,142
  - Density: 2,286.3/sq mi (882.75/km^{2})
- Time zone: UTC-5 (Eastern (EST))
  - Summer (DST): UTC-4 (EDT)
- FIPS code: 12-54387
- GNIS feature ID: 2403391

Palm River-Clair Mel is a census-designated place (CDP) in Hillsborough County, Florida, United States. As of the 2020 census, Palm River-Clair Mel had a population of 26,142. The census area includes the unincorporated communities of Clair-Mel City and Palm River. The ZIP code for Palm River-Clair Mel is 33619.

== Geography ==
Palm River-Clair Mel is located just west of the geographic center of Hillsborough County or approximately 6 miles (10 km) southeast of downtown Tampa. The CDP is bordered to the north and west by the city of Tampa, to the east by Brandon, to the southeast by Riverview, and to the south by Progress Village. The Palm River forms the northern boundary of the CDP.

U.S. Route 41 runs through the western part of the CDP, leading north into the eastern part of Tampa and south to Gibsonton. U.S. Route 41 Business runs west from US 41 and crosses East Bay/McKay Bay for a more direct route to downtown Tampa. U.S. Route 301 forms the eastern edge of the CDP, running north to East Lake-Orient Park and south to Riverview.

According to the United States Census Bureau, the Palm River-Clair Mel CDP has a total area of 11.7 square miles (30.4 km^{2}), of which 11.5 square miles (29.9 km^{2}) are land and 0.2 square miles (0.5 km^{2}), or 1.77%, are water.

== Demographics ==
Historical population
Census	Pop.	Note	%±
1970	8,536		—
1980	14,447		69.2%
1990	13,691		−5.2%
2000	17,589		28.5%
2010	21,024		19.5%
2020	26,142		24.3%

=== 2020 census ===
As of the 2020 census, Palm River-Clair Mel had a population of 26,142. The median age was 35.2 years. 24.0% of residents were under the age of 18 and 12.2% of residents were 65 years of age or older. For every 100 females there were 95.3 males, and for every 100 females age 18 and over there were 93.8 males age 18 and over.

100.0% of residents lived in urban areas, while 0.0% lived in rural areas.

There were 9,361 households in Palm River-Clair Mel, of which 35.4% had children under the age of 18 living in them. Of all households, 39.2% were married-couple households, 19.7% were households with a male householder and no spouse or partner present, and 30.8% were households with a female householder and no spouse or partner present. About 23.0% of all households were made up of individuals and 7.4% had someone living alone who was 65 years of age or older.

There were 9,851 housing units, of which 5.0% were vacant. The homeowner vacancy rate was 1.4% and the rental vacancy rate was 5.3%.

Racial composition as of the 2020 census
Race	Number	Percent
White	9,094	34.8%
Black or African American	6,525	25.0%
American Indian and Alaska Native	117	0.4%
Asian	715	2.7%
Native Hawaiian and Other Pacific Islander	22	0.1%
Some other race	3,777	14.4%
Two or more races	5,892	22.5%
Hispanic or Latino (of any race)	11,961	45.8%

=== 2010 census ===
As of the 2010 census, there were 24,379 people living in the community. The racial makeup of the community was 51% White, 35% African American, 0% Native American, 2% Asian, 0% Pacific Islander, 8% from other races, and 4% from two or more races. Hispanic or Latino of any race were 35% of the population.

There were 6,034 households, out of which 38.7% had children under the age of 18 living with them, 47.6% were married couples living together, 21.6% had a female householder with no husband present, and 24.8% were non-families. 19.3% of all households were made up of individuals, and 5.8% had someone living alone who was 65 years of age or older. The average household size was 2.91 and the average family size was 3.33.

In the community the population was spread out, with 31.5% under the age of 18, 9.0% from 18 to 24, 29.1% from 25 to 44, 21.8% from 45 to 64, and 8.7% who were 65 years of age or older. The median age was 32 years. For every 100 females, there were 95.0 males. For every 100 females age 18 and over, there were 90.5 males.

The median income for a household in the community was $35,380, and the median income for a family was $38,035. Males had a median income of $27,796 versus $22,973 for females. The per capita income for the community was $14,593. About 14.9% of families and 17.4% of the population were below the poverty line, including 26.1% of those under age 18 and 9.0% of those age 65 or over.
