= Phosphogypsum =

Manmade calcium sulfate hydrate by-product

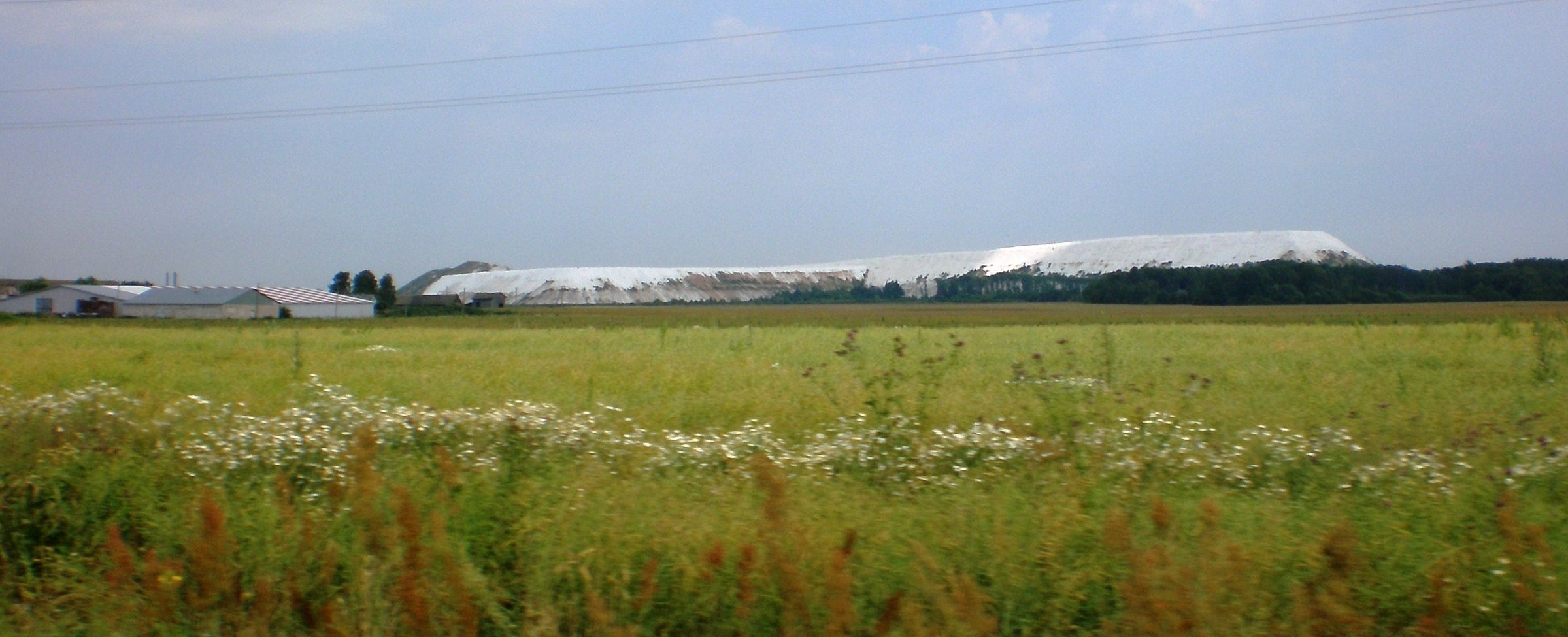
Phosphogypsum stack located near Kėdainiai, Lithuania 55°14′47″N 24°01′44″E.

Phosphogypsum (PG) is the calcium sulfate hydrate formed as a by-product of the production of fertilizer, particularly phosphoric acid, from phosphate rock. It is mainly composed of gypsum (CaSO_{4} · 2 H_{2}O). Although gypsum is a widely used material in the construction industry, phosphogypsum is usually not used, but is stored indefinitely because of its weak radioactivity caused by the presence of naturally occurring uranium (U) and thorium (Th), and their daughter isotopes radium (Ra), radon (Rn) and polonium (Po). On the other hand, it includes several valuable components—calcium sulphates and elements such as silicon, iron, titanium, magnesium, aluminum, and manganese. However, the long-term storage of phosphogypsum is controversial. About five tons of phosphogypsum are generated per ton of phosphoric acid production. Annually, the estimated generation of phosphogypsum worldwide is 100 to 280 million metric tons.

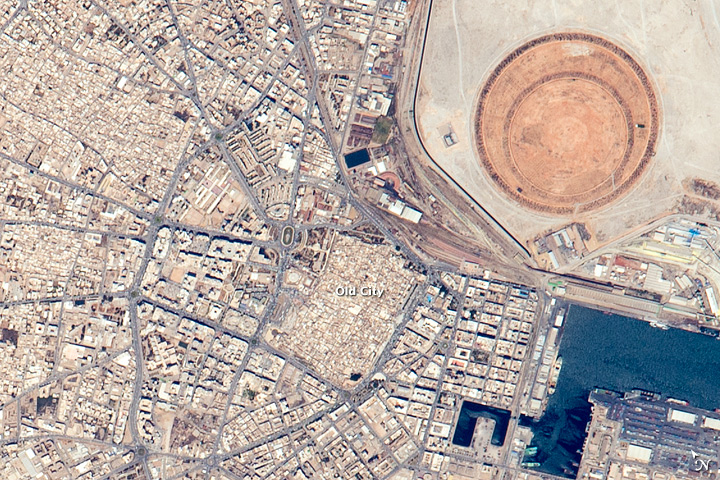
A 2015 astronaut photo of the Medina of Sfax with part of the port and the distinctive circular earth works of the 420 ha Taparura redevelopment project of which 260 ha have been reclaimed from the sea by depositing phosphogypsum.

== Production and properties ==
Phosphogypsum is a by-product from the production of phosphoric acid by treating phosphate ore (apatite) with sulfuric acid according to the following reaction:

Ca_{5}(PO_{4})_{3}X + 5 H_{2}SO_{4} + 10 H_{2}O → 3 H_{3}PO_{4} + 5 (CaSO_{4} · 2 H_{2}O) + HX
where X may include OH, F, Cl, or Br

It is radioactive due to the presence of naturally occurring uranium (5–10 ppm) and thorium, and their daughter nuclides radium, radon, polonium, etc. Marine-deposited phosphate typically has a higher level of radioactivity than igneous phosphate deposits, because uranium is present in seawater at about 3 ppb (roughly 85 ppb of total dissolved solids). Uranium is concentrated during the formation of evaporite deposits as dissolved solids precipitate in order of solubility with easily dissolved materials such as sodium chloride remaining in solution longer than less soluble materials like uranium or sulfates. Other components of phosphogypsum include silica (5–10%), fluoride (F, ~1%), phosphorus (P, ~0.5%), iron (Fe, ~0.1%), aluminum (Al, ~0.1%), barium (Ba, 50 ppm), lead (Pb, ~5 ppm), chromium (Cr, ~3 ppm), selenium (Se, ~1 ppm), and cadmium (Cd, ~0.3 ppm). About 90% of Po and Ra from raw ore is retained into Phosphogypsum. Thus it can be considered technologically enhanced naturally occurring radioactive material (TENORM).

== Use ==
Various applications have been proposed for using phosphogypsum, including using it as material for:

- Artificial reefs and oyster beds
- Cover for landfills
- Road pavement
- Roof tiles
- Soil conditioner

According to Taylor (2009), "up to 15% of world PG production is used to make building materials, as a soil amendment and as a set controller in the manufacture of Portland cement". The rest remains in stack.

=== In the United States ===
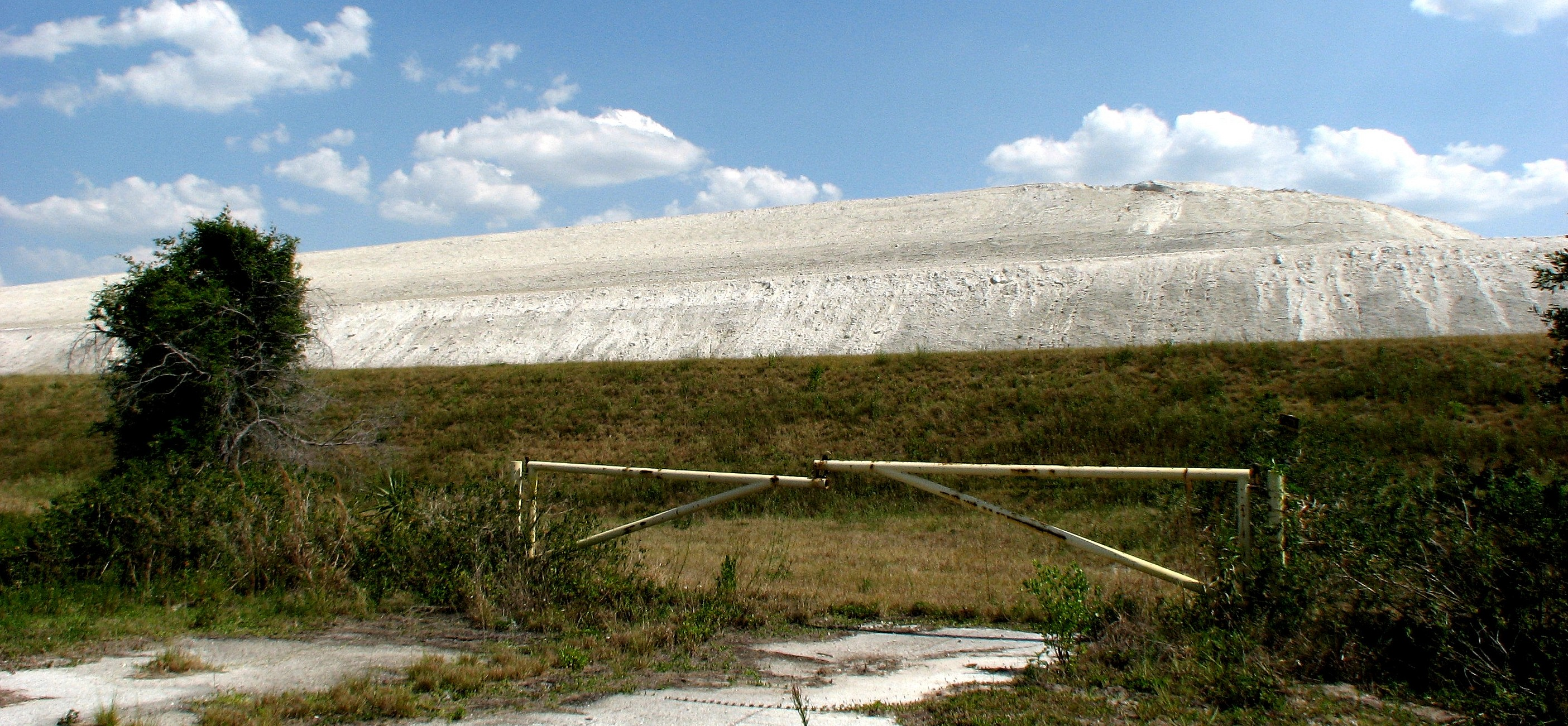
A phosphogypsum stack or "gyp stack", located near Fort Meade, Florida. These contain the waste byproducts of the phosphate fertilizer industry.

The United States Environmental Protection Agency (EPA) has banned most applications of phosphogypsum having a ^{226}Ra concentration of greater than 10 picocurie/gram (0.4 Bq/g) in 1990. As a result, phosphogypsum which exceeds this limit is stored in large stacks since extracting such low concentrations of radium is either not possible or not economical with current technology for either the use of the gypsum or the radium. Given the traditional definition of the Curie via the specific activity of ^{226}Ra, this limit is equivalent to 0.01 milligrams (0.00015 gr) of radium per metric ton or a concentration of 10 parts per trillion. (See § Gyp stacks below.)

EPA approved the use of phosphogypsum for road construction during the Trump Administration in 2020, saying that the approval came at the request of The Fertilizer Institute, which advocates for the fertilizer industry. Environmentalists opposed the decision, saying that using the radioactive material in this way can pose health risks. In 2021, the EPA withdrew the rule authorizing the use of phosphogypsum in road construction.

The state of Florida has approximately 80% of the world's phosphogypsum production capacity. In May 2023, the Florida legislature passed a bill requiring the Florida Department of Transportation to study the use of phosphogypsum in road construction, including demonstration projects, though this would require federal approval. The law, which requires the department to complete a study and make a recommendation by April 1, 2024, was signed into law by Governor Ron DeSantis on June 29, 2023.

=== In China ===
China's phosphate fertilizer production exceeded that of the US in 2005, and with it came the problem of excess phosphogypsum. By 2018, inappropriate storage has become a major problem in the Yangtze River watershed, with phosphorus accounting for 56% of all breaches of water quality standards. Phosphorus, which still remains in phosphogypsum, can lead to eutrophication of bodies of water and hence algal blooms or even anoxic events ("dead zones") in the lower layers of a body of water. The total amount of phosphogypsum in storage by 2020 exceeds 600 Mt, with 75 Mt produced each year.

The construction industry is the number one user of phosphogypsum in 2020, with 10.5 Mt used as concrete set retarder and 3.5 Mt used in drywall. It is also used as a chemical feedstock for producing sulfates, and as a soil conditioner similar to regular gypsum. The total consumption in 2020 was 31 Mt, much lower than the rate of accumulation. There has been a significant push to expand the use of phosphogypsum on the national level since 2016, being part of two consecutive five-year plans.

Phosphogypsum may require pre-processing to remove contaminants before use. Phosphorus (P) significantly retards curing and reduces the strength of the material, an important concern in construction. Fluorine (F) may accumulate in crops. Although Chinese phosphogypsum generally contain less toxic heavy metals and radioactive elements, some nevertheless exceed acceptable radioactivity limits for building material, or produce crops with unacceptable amounts of arsenic (As), lead (Pb), cadmium (Cd), or mercury (Hg). Barriers to further use include cost of heavy metal removal and considerable variation among sources of phosphogypsum.

== Pollution and cleanup ==
Phosphogypsum may pollute the environment by its phosphorus content causing eutrophication, by its toxic heavy metal content, and by its radioactivity. PG releases radon, which can accumulate indoors if used as a construction material. Open-air stores also release radon at a level potentially hazardous to workers. Radon is a noble gas that is heavier than air and thus tends to accumulate in poorly ventilated underground spaces like mines or cellars. Naturally occurring radon is considered the second most common cause of lung cancer after smoking. More substantial however is the leaching of the contents of phosphogypsum into the water table and consequently soil, exacerbated by the fact that PG is often transported as a slurry. Accumulation of water inside of gypstacks can lead to weakening of the stack structure, a cause of several alarms in the United States.

The main approach to reducing PG pollution is to act before it leaches into the environment. This can mean recycling purified materials from PG in a variety of applications (see above) or converting it into a more stable form for storage. Cement paste backfill converts hazardous mining waste, such as PG, into a cement paste, and then uses the paste to fill in voids created by mining the rocks.

Bioremediation may be used to clean up already contaminated water and soil. Microbials can remove heavy metals, radioactive material, and any organic pollutants within, and reduce the sulfate material. With suitable soil amendments and additives, PG can also support the growth of hardy plants, hopefully preventing further erosion.

=== Gyp stacks ===
Often phosphogypsum reuse is uneconomical due to impurities, mining companies commonly dump the waste into man-made hills called "phosphogypsum stacks" or waste ponds near the mine. Waste ponds are open-air reservoirs that contain a variety of different types of industrial and agricultural waste. including at least 70 phosphogypsum stacks (from phosphate mines used for fertilizer production). A leaking phosphogypsum waste pond that nearly collapsed, if waste was not allowed to flow into Tampa Bay in Florida in 2021, highlights the dangers and near-disasters associated with wastewater ponds throughout the country.

Central Florida has a large quantity of phosphate deposits, particularly in the Bone Valley region. The marine-deposited phosphate ore from central Florida is weakly radioactive, and as such, the phosphogypsum by-product (in which the radionuclides are somewhat concentrated) is too radioactive to be used for most applications. As a result, there are about a billion tons of phosphogypsum stacked in 25 stacks in Florida (22 are in central Florida) and about 30 million additional tons are generated each year.

== See also ==
- Gypsum § Refinery waste
- Red mud - highly alkaline waste product from aluminum processing
- Mine tailings - general issue of waste products left after mining
- Acid mine drainage - highly acidic waters produced from interactions between water oxygen and sulfur compounds deposited under reducing conditions
