= Alafia, Florida =

Town in Florida, United States

- Unincorporated community
- Location within Florida Location within the United States
- Coordinates: 27°53′11″N 82°7′38″W
- Country: United States
- State: Florida
- County: Hillsborough
- Time zone: UTC-5 (Eastern (EST))
  - Summer (DST): UTC-4 (EDT)

Alafia is an unincorporated community in southeastern Hillsborough County, Florida, United States, between Plant City and Lithia near the intersection of Keysville Road (county road 676) and Florida State Road 39.

== History ==
Alafia is one of Hillsborough County's oldest communities, dating to circa 1842 when Prussian immigrants, including Antoine Wordehoff, settled in the area, soon to be joined by several families under the auspices of the Armed Occupation Act. An armed garrison for monitoring the Seminoles was established in 1849, and settlers soon followed. By 1970 the community comprised 442 people.

Alafia was also the site of SV 831.6, a station on the Plant City, Arcadia, and Gulf Railroad.

== Education ==
The community of Alafia is served by Hillsborough County Schools.

== Notable person ==
- W. B. Henderson served as captain of a cavalry company in Alafia during the American Civil War.
