= Coronet Industries =

American chemical company

- Industry: Chemical Manufacturing
- Predecessor: Coronet Phosphate Company
- Founded: 1906; 120 years ago
- Defunct: 2004
- Fate: Closed by Regulatory Body
- Headquarters: Plant City, Florida, United States

Coronet Industries Incorporated was a chemical company that operated a plant converting phosphate to animal feed located in Hillsborough County, Florida, just miles outside of Plant City. The plant operated for almost 100 years under several corporate ownerships before closing in March 2004 in the midst of an investigation by the United States Environmental Protection Agency, the State of Florida, and the Environmental Protection Commission of Hillsborough County. A community developed around the mine.

The company was originally organized as the Coronet Phosphate Company in 1906. The processing plant near Plant City was constructed and began mining operations in 1908. The phosphate was mined from the surrounding land holdings by a combination of dragline removal of the soil above the phosphate deposits (overburden) and hydraulic pressure stripping. The raw phosphate material was then transported to the processing plant where it was dried and stored for later shipment. The phosphate deposits in the nearby area were generally mined out by the 1920s, and mining operations shifted to the Hopewell area about 15 miles south of Plant City. In 1913 the Coronet Company purchased the Pembroke Mine facility, located between Fort Meade and Bartow in Polk County, from the French company Compagnie Generale des Phosphates de la Florida. In addition to the Pembroke Mine, the Coronet Company operated mining facilities at a number of other sites it acquired in Hillsborough and Polk counties. Operations at the main Plant City plant consisted solely of the drying of the rock material and its shipment to users by rail until 1945 when the plant was expanded to allow institution of a defluorinating process involving a chemical treatment of the rock. Defluorination allowed the conversion of phosphate to an animal feed supplement, Coronet Defluorinated Phosphate (CDP), which became the principal product of the company in later years.

Construction at the original plant site, Coronet Village, included approximately 75 houses for both white and black plant and mine employees. Because public roads and highways were somewhat primitive and private automobiles were not very common, having employees live near to the processing plant was desirable. The Pembroke Mine also had a fairly extensive employee housing village. Less extensive employee housing facilities were also constructed at the other mining sites. Both the Coronet and Pembroke Village sites were generally self-contained small towns with a company store, recreation facilities, and water and sewage infrastructure. These small self-supporting company villages were fairly common in the Florida phosphate industry from the early 1900s until about 1960.

The Coronet Phosphate Company continued operating as an independent company until its purchase in 1952 by the Smith-Douglass Corporation of Norfolk, Virginia. Then, in 1964 Smith-Douglass was acquired by the Borden Company who, in turn, sold the company to Consolidated Minerals, Inc. Finally, that company sold the Coronet facilities to two Japanese firms, Onoda Chemical Industry Company, Ltd., and Mitsui & Co., the present owners. They operated Coronet under the current name, Coronet Industries, Inc. In the course of these various changes in ownership and the change from a strictly drying operation to the institution of the CDP treatment, a concern developed in the surrounding area over whether the Coronet operations were producing adverse environmental effects on the nearby housing and agricultural areas.

Residents of the surrounding community alleged that pollution from the plant leached into the groundwater and caused increased rates of cancer amongst other health problems. Arsenic, boron, cadmium, lead and other dangerous chemicals were detected in residential wells surrounding the plant. The federal Environmental Protection Agency cautioned state officials about potential health risks associated with leaky equipment and corroded stacks allowing underwater leaching and spills from Coronet, but residents were not notified of ongoing problems with the company's lack of environmental controls. Florida Department of Environmental Protection (DEP) Secretary David Struhs expressed concern over "potential systemic problems that prevented the situation from being identified and corrected sooner" in the Tampa office of the DEP. Legislation requiring the state of Florida to notify area residents in such events was proposed.

A 2006 report by the state of Florida said that those who were exposed to the Coronet site after 2003 were at no health risk, although there was insufficient evidence to draw a conclusion about those who were exposed before that time.

Approximately 1,200 residents who live near the plant and former employees of Coronet Industries have filed a class-action lawsuit against the company, alleging amongst other things that the pollution from the plant has harmed their health and lowered property values. Coronet, at the time it was shut down in 2004, was owned by Japan-based Mitsui and Onoda Chemical. Previous owners include Borden Chemical, Smith-Douglas and Browne Gregg. The residents were initially represented by Masry & Vititoe, the firm which employed environmental activist Erin Brockovich, among other law firms.
