= The Mosaic Company =

American chemical company

- Type: Public
- Traded as: NYSE: MOS; S&P 500 component
- Industry: Agriculture; Fertilizer
- Predecessors: IMC Global; Cargill (crop nutrition division)
- Founded: October 22, 2004; 21 years ago, through combination of IMC Global Inc. and Cargill, Incorporated
- Headquarters: Tampa, Florida, U.S.
- Key people: Gregory Ebel (chairman); Bruce Bodine (president & CEO)
- Products: Aspire; Feed; K-Mag; MicroEssentials; Pegasus; Phosphate; Potash; Urea
- Revenue: ▲US$12.05 billion (2025)
- Operating income: ▲US$821.5 million (2025)
- Net income: ▲US$540.7 million (2025)
- Total assets: ▲US$24.48 billion (2025)
- Total equity: ▲US$12.08 billion (2025)
- Number of employees: 13,249 (2025)
- Website: mosaicco.com

The Mosaic Company is an American chemical company based in Tampa, Florida, which mines phosphate and potash and collects urea used for fertilizer, through various international distribution networks and Mosaic Fertilizantes. It is the largest U.S. producer of potash and phosphate fertilizers.

== Overview ==
The Mosaic Company was formed in October 2004 by a merger between IMC Global, a fertilizer company formed in 1909, and Cargill's crop nutrition division. It is a combined producer and marketer of concentrated phosphate and potash with a customer base that includes wholesalers, retail dealers and individual growers worldwide. Its headquarters are in Tampa, and it employs about 13,000 people in eight countries.

== Products ==
=== Potash ===
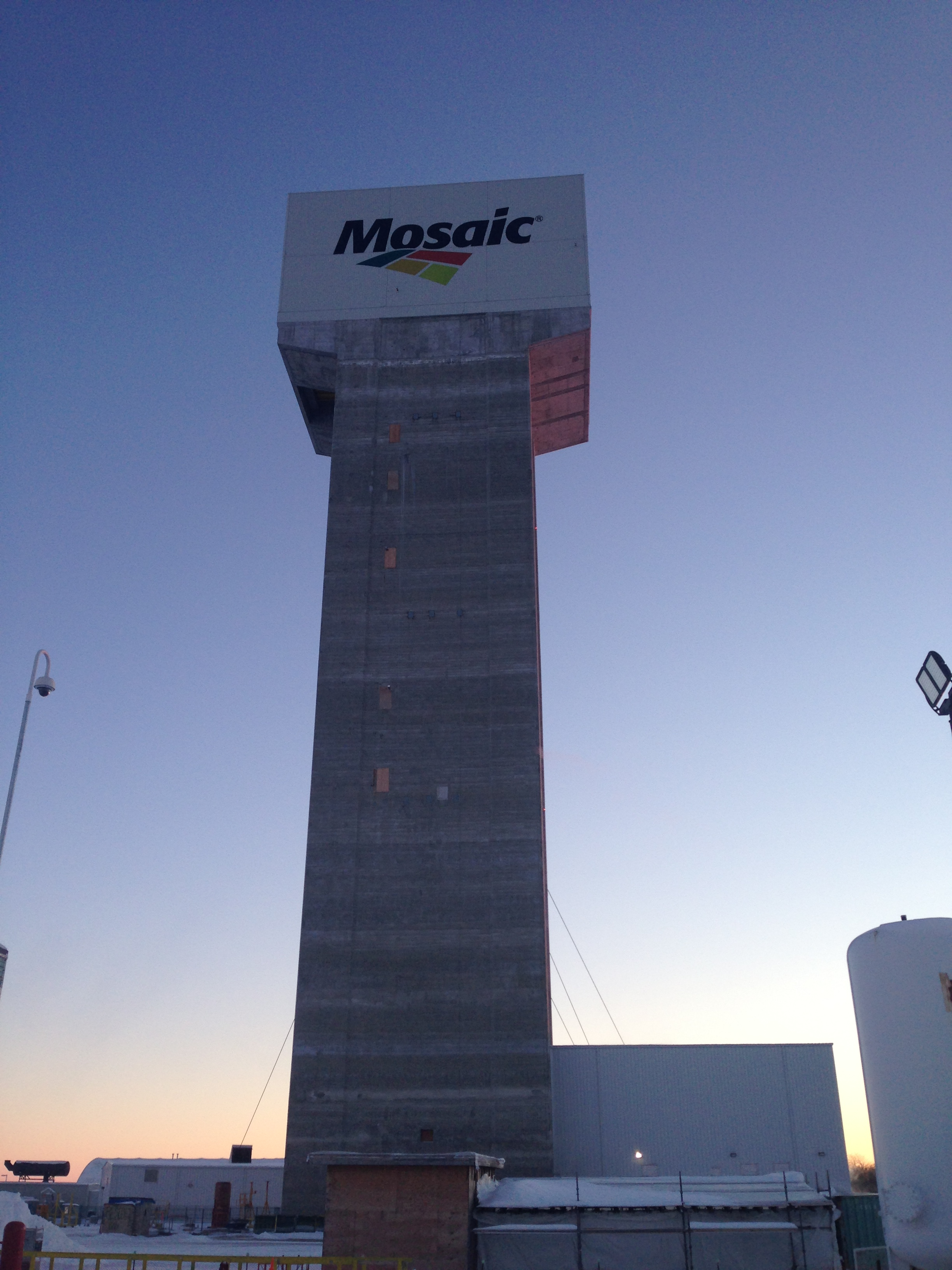
K3 North Shaft headframe,Esterhazy, Saskatchewan

Mosaic has roughly 10.4 million tons of operational potash capacity. The company owns potash mines or surface mills in Belle Plaine, Colonsay, and Esterhazy (K1, K2, and K3) in Saskatchewan, and Carlsbad, New Mexico, with another potash mine recently purchased in Brazil during the Vale Fertilizantes acquisition. The Colonsay mine and mill are indefinitely idled and in maintenance mode. Esterhazy K3, in development, consists of an underground mine and service/production shafts separate from the K1 and K2 underground mines. Esterhazy K3 does not have surface milling and storage facilities. Instead, it is intended to replace the ore being mined from the K1 and K2 mines. The shift in production was to decrease brine-management costs of the K1 and K2 mines, which were $108.0 million for 2020.

Mosaic is a member of Canpotex, an export association of Canadian potash producers through which they sell their Canadian potash outside the U.S. and Canada.

Its potash mine locations are:

- Carlsbad, New Mexico (32.412°N 103.939°W)
- Belle Plaine, Saskatchewan (50.429°N 105.199°W)
- Colonsay, Saskatchewan (51.928°N 105.766°W)
- Esterhazy, Saskatchewan K1 (50.729°N 101.929°W)
- Esterhazy, Saskatchewan K2 (50.660°N 101.846°W)
- Esterhazy, Saskatchewan K3 (50.644°N 101.993°W)

=== Phosphate ===
Mosaic has about 16.8 million tons of operational capacity for finished concentrated phosphates. The company is the largest producer of finished phosphate products with an annual capacity greater than the next two largest producers combined. It has a global distribution network made up of plants, port facilities, warehouses, and sales offices. In 2013, Mosaic produced 7.6 million tons of concentrated phosphate crop nutrients and over 15 million tons of phosphate rock production. In October 2013, Mosaic reached an agreement to purchase the phosphate operations of CF Industries for US$1.4 billion, which eliminates the need for Mosaic to spend an additional billion dollars to build a processing facility in Hardee County, Florida, to process the rock from the mines in the area.

Phosphate mines are located in the Bone Valley formation of the Peace River watershed in Central Florida:

- Fort Meade (27.648°N 81.757°W)
- South Pasture (27.586°N 81.942°W)
- Four Corners (27.715°N 82.141°W)
- Wingate Creek (27.506°N 82.130°W)
- Fort Lonesome (27.715°N 82.150°W)(Closed)

Mosaic owns a 25% stake in the Ma'aden Wa'ad Al Shamal Phosphate Company joint venture in Saudi Arabia. With the completion of the Vale Fertilizantes acquisition in January, 2018, an additional five Brazilian phosphate rock mines, four chemical plants, and an additional 40% economic interest in the Miski Mayo mine were purchased.

== Carbon footprint ==
The Mosaic Company reported total CO_{2}e emissions (direct + indirect) for 31 December 2020 at 4,920 Kt (+340/+7.4% year-over-year).

The Mosaic Company's total CO_{2}e emissions (direct + dndirect) (in kilotonnes)
Dec 2018	Dec 2019	Dec 2020
5,270	4,580	4,920

== Timeline ==
2023

- August: The Mosaic Board of Directors elected Bruce Bodine to succeed Joc O'Rourke as Mosaic's CEO effective January 1, 2024. Bodine was to serve as Mosaic president and a member of the board of directors effective immediately.

2018

- January: Mosaic completed the acquisition of Vale Fertilizantes.

2015

- August: Joc O'Rourke succeeded Jim Prokopanko as Mosaic's president and CEO.

2014

- December: Mosaic acquired Archer Daniels Midland's fertilizer distribution business in Brazil and Paraguay.
- July: Cargill acquired Mosaic's Hersey, Michigan, salt plant.

2013

- November: Mosaic closed the potash operations at the Hersey facility.

2011

- May: Mosaic and Cargill completed a transaction to split off and distribute Cargill's stake in Mosaic.
- January: Mosaic and Cargill agreed to split off and orderly distribute Cargill's stake in Mosaic.

2007

- January: Jim Prokopanko succeeded Fritz Corrigan as president and CEO of Mosaic.

2006

- July: Jim Prokopanko was named Mosaic's chief operating officer.

2004

- October: The Mosaic Company (NYSE: MOS) began trading on the New York Stock Exchange.
- June: Mosaic was announced as the chosen name for the newly formed company.
- January: The crop nutrition business of Cargill, Inc. and IMC Global entered into a definitive agreement to form a new crop nutrition company.
