= Mulberry (alloy) =

Mulberry is a uranium alloy.

It is used as a non-corroding or 'stainless' uranium alloy. It has been put forward as a structural material for the casings of the physics package in nuclear weapons, including those of North Korea.

The composition is a ternary alloy, (Note: An alloy of three main metals.) of 7.5% niobium, 2.5% zirconium, 90% uranium.

Mulberry was developed in the 1960s at UCRL. Binary alloy compositions were first studied to avoid the mechanical problems of pure uranium: corrosion, dimensional instability, inability to improve its mechanical properties by heat treatment. Uranium-molybdenum alloys were found susceptible to stress-corrosion cracking, uranium-niobium alloys to be weak, and uranium-zirconium alloys to be brittle. Ternary alloys were next studied to try to avoid these drawbacks. Uranium-niobium-zirconium was found to be corrosion resistant and to permit age hardening, which could increase its hardness from 760 to 1,860 megapascals (110 to 270 ksi).

Multiple crystal phases were observed, with a critical temperature of 650 °C. Above this the body-centered cubic γ phase was stable. Water quenching to room temperature produces a γ^{s} transition phase and with aging this transforms to a tetragonal γ^{o} phase. Further aging produces a monoclinic ɑ″ phase that is observed metallographically as a Widmanstätten pattern. The crystal structure of the alloy has been studied, particularly the γ phase. Uranium inclusions have been observed within the alloy although, unlike the binary alloys, niobium-rich inclusions were not. Early studies were uncertain as to whether these were inherent behaviours, or artifacts of their processing.
