= IMC Global =

US-based mining and production company

IMC Global, Inc.
- Traded as: NYSE: IGL
- Industry: Agriculture, Fertilizer
- Founded: New York City (June 14, 1909)
- Defunct: 2004
- Fate: Merged with part of Cargill, Inc.
- Successor: The Mosaic Company
- Headquarters: Lake Forest, Illinois, United States
- Revenue: ▲$ 2.2 billion (FY 2003)
- Number of employees: 5017 (2003)

IMC Global (also known as International Minerals and Chemical Corporation and Imcera) was a mining and production company, formerly listed on the S&P MidCap 400. It was founded in 1909 as International Agricultural Corporation. In 2004, IMC Global merged with Cargill, Inc.'s crop nutrition division to form The Mosaic Company, a crop nutrition company.

== History ==
IMC Global was incorporated as International Agricultural Corporation on June 14, 1909, by Walderman Schmidten in the state of New York. A native German, Schmidten moved to secure entire capital in mines from his home country; he was successful in doing so with the Kaliwerke Sollstedt Gewerkschaft. Phosphate and potash production facilities were acquired in Tennessee and Florida. Capital stock of the International Agricultural Corporation was originally fixed at $15 million in July 1909, but increased to $36 million by April 1911. As World War I broke out, demand for fertilizer declined while that for sulfuric acid skyrocketed. International Agricultural Corporation was the largest owner and distributor of phosphate in the United States by the 1920s.

International Agricultural Corporation changed its name to International Minerals and Chemical Corporation in late 1941, shortly before merging with United Potash and Chemical Corporation. Potash operations of IMC were greatly expanded due to the merger. Competition from other German mines disappeared in World War II, as all Germany imports were suspended during the war. This provided a record demand in potash for the years during and after the war. IMC later expanded production operations to other parts of the country, including California. For the next 30 years, IMC would continue its expansion by acquiring companies like E.J. Lavino and Company, Great Lakes Container Corporation, and Chemical Leaman Tank Lines. By 1975, IMC had procured operations in thirty-five states, Canada, and fifteen other countries.

In 1986 International Minerals and Chemical Corporation acquired Mallinckrodt, a leading chemical company headquartered in St. Louis. In April 1990 the company name became Imcera, after a year-long marketing study, but only briefly. In 1994 the parent company took the Mallinckrodt name for itself, then subsequently spun off its original businesses to a new publicly traded company known as IMC. The remainder of this history relates to the new IMC, which had different shareholders and management from the former IMC but basically the same staff and businesses.

=== Further expansion ===
During the first quarter of 1996, IMC acquired Chicago-based fertilizer producer and distributor Vigoro Corp. for a $1.16 billion (~$2.14 billion in 2024) stock exchange. At this point, IMC Corporation was renamed to IMC Global and the potash operations became IMC Kalium.

In 1997, a merger occurred between IMC and the previous parent company of Freeport-McMoRan, who retained their copper and gold mining ventures. The merger took place with an $800 million exchange in stock. Later in the year, it was announced IMC acquired Western Ag-Minerals Co., a subsidiary of Rayrock Yellowknife Resources, and its mine in Carlsbad, New Mexico, for nearly $53 million. Before the acquisition was completed, the deal was vetted by the Department of Justice and Federal Trade Commission, as the sale could allow IMC (now the owner of two mines in the area) to largely control the price of fertilizer. An independent study concluded that the deal would allow for the combination of resources in the region and substantially improve the efficiency of mining operations. Near the end of the year, IMC completed another acquisition, this time with Harris Chemical Group, Inc. for $450 million in cash and $950 million in assumed debt. The move further expanded its fertilizer and salt businesses.

== Merger with Cargill ==
In January 2004, Cargill, Inc. announced a definitive agreement to merge its crop nutrition division with IMC. A naming competition was held for the new company and Mosaic was announced the winner in June. The Mosaic Company began trading on the New York Stock Exchange on October 25, 2004, and became the newest Fortune 500-sized firm listed.
