= Progress Village, Florida =

Progress Village
- Census-designated place
- Location in Hillsborough County and the state of Florida
- Coordinates: 27°52′47″N 82°21′32″W
- Country: United States
- State: Florida
- County: Hillsborough

Area
  - Total: 3.25 sq mi (8.42 km^{2})
  - Land: 3.03 sq mi (7.84 km^{2})
  - Water: 0.22 sq mi (0.58 km^{2})
- Elevation: 16 ft (4.9 m)

Population (2020)
  - Total: 11,188
  - Density: 3,697.7/sq mi (1,427.69/km^{2})
- Time zone: UTC-5 (Eastern (EST))
  - Summer (DST): UTC-4 (EDT)
- ZIP code: 33619
- Area code: 813
- FIPS code: 12-59050
- GNIS feature ID: 2403451

Progress Village is a census-designated place (CDP) in Hillsborough County, Florida, United States. Per the 2020 census, the population was 11,188.

== Geography ==
Progress Village is located near the geographic center of Hillsborough County and is bordered by Palm River-Clair Mel to the north, Riverview to the east, and Gibsonton to the south. Interstate 75 forms the eastern edge of the CDP, and the western edge follows County Road 573. Progress Village is 9 miles (14 km) southeast of downtown Tampa.

According to the United States Census Bureau, the CDP has a total area of 3.2 square miles (8.4 km^{2}), of which 3.0 square miles (7.8 km^{2}) are land and 0.2 square miles (0.6 km^{2}), or 6.90%, are water.

== Demographics ==
Historical population
Census	Pop.	Note	%±
1970	2,573		—
2000	2,482		—
2010	5,392		117.2%
2020	11,188		107.5%
U.S. Decennial Census; 2010 2020

=== Racial and ethnic composition ===
Progress Village CDP, Florida – Racial and ethnic composition Note: the US Census treats Hispanic/Latino as an ethnic category. This table excludes Latinos from the racial categories and assigns them to a separate category. Hispanics/Latinos may be of any race.
Race / Ethnicity (NH = Non-Hispanic)	Pop 2000	Pop 2010	Pop 2020	% 2000	% 2010	% 2020
White alone (NH)	146	1,547	3,125	5.88%	28.69%	27.93%
Black or African American alone (NH)	2,235	2,699	3,944	90.05%	50.06%	35.25%
Native American or Alaska Native alone (NH)	1	7	29	0.04%	0.13%	0.26%
Asian alone (NH)	3	210	555	0.12%	3.89%	4.96%
Native Hawaiian or Pacific Islander alone (NH)	2	1	2	0.08%	0.02%	0.02%
Other race alone (NH)	1	19	114	0.04%	0.35%	1.02%
Mixed race or Multiracial (NH)	26	108	530	1.05%	2.00%	4.74%
Hispanic or Latino (any race)	68	801	2,889	2.74%	14.86%	25.82%
Total	2,482	5,392	11,188	100.00%	100.00%	100.00%

=== 2020 census ===
As of the 2020 census, Progress Village had a population of 11,188. The median age was 34.0 years. 24.1% of residents were under the age of 18 and 9.4% of residents were 65 years of age or older. For every 100 females, there were 88.2 males, and for every 100 females age 18 and over, there were 83.3 males age 18 and over.

100.0% of residents lived in urban areas, while 0.0% lived in rural areas.

There were 4,360 households in Progress Village, of which 33.3% had children under the age of 18 living in them. Of all households, 40.6% were married-couple households, 16.5% were households with a male householder and no spouse or partner present, and 33.2% were households with a female householder and no spouse or partner present. About 26.0% of all households were made up of individuals, and 5.7% had someone living alone who was 65 years of age or older.

There were 4,590 housing units, of which 5.0% were vacant. The homeowner vacancy rate was 2.3% and the rental vacancy rate was 5.4%.

=== 2000 census ===
As of the census of 2000, there were 2,482 people, 853 households, and 622 families residing in the community. The population density was 737.4 inhabitants per square mile (284.7/km^{2}). There were 905 housing units at an average density of 268.9 per square mile (103.8/km^{2}). The racial makeup of the community was 6.69% White, 90.73% African American, 0.04% Native American, 0.12% Asian, 0.08% Pacific Islander, 1.09% from other races, and 1.25% from two or more races. Hispanic or Latino of any race were 2.74% of the population.

There were 853 households, out of which 28.5% had children under the age of 18 living with them, 37.9% were married couples living together, 28.1% had a female householder with no husband present, and 27.0% were non-families. 22.9% of all households were made up of individuals, and 11.5% had someone living alone who was 65 years of age or older. The average household size was 2.91 and the average family size was 3.41.

In the community the population was spread out, with 30.9% under the age of 18, 7.6% from 18 to 24, 23.3% from 25 to 44, 23.3% from 45 to 64, and 14.9% who were 65 years of age or older. The median age was 35 years. For every 100 females, there were 83.9 males. For every 100 females age 18 and over, there were 75.7 males.

The median income for a household in the community was $27,708, and the median income for a family was $32,384. Males had a median income of $24,440 versus $21,521 for females. The per capita income for the community was $11,781. About 15.1% of families and 18.4% of the population were below the poverty line, including 29.9% of those under age 18 and 14.8% of those age 65 or over.

== History ==
Progress Village was Tampa's first low-income housing suburb. It was planned as a neighborhood for low-income residents outside of the city limits.

Progress Village Middle Magnet School of the Arts and Jack Lamb Elementary School are on the southern edge of Progress Village.
