= Nichols, Florida =

- Unincorporated community
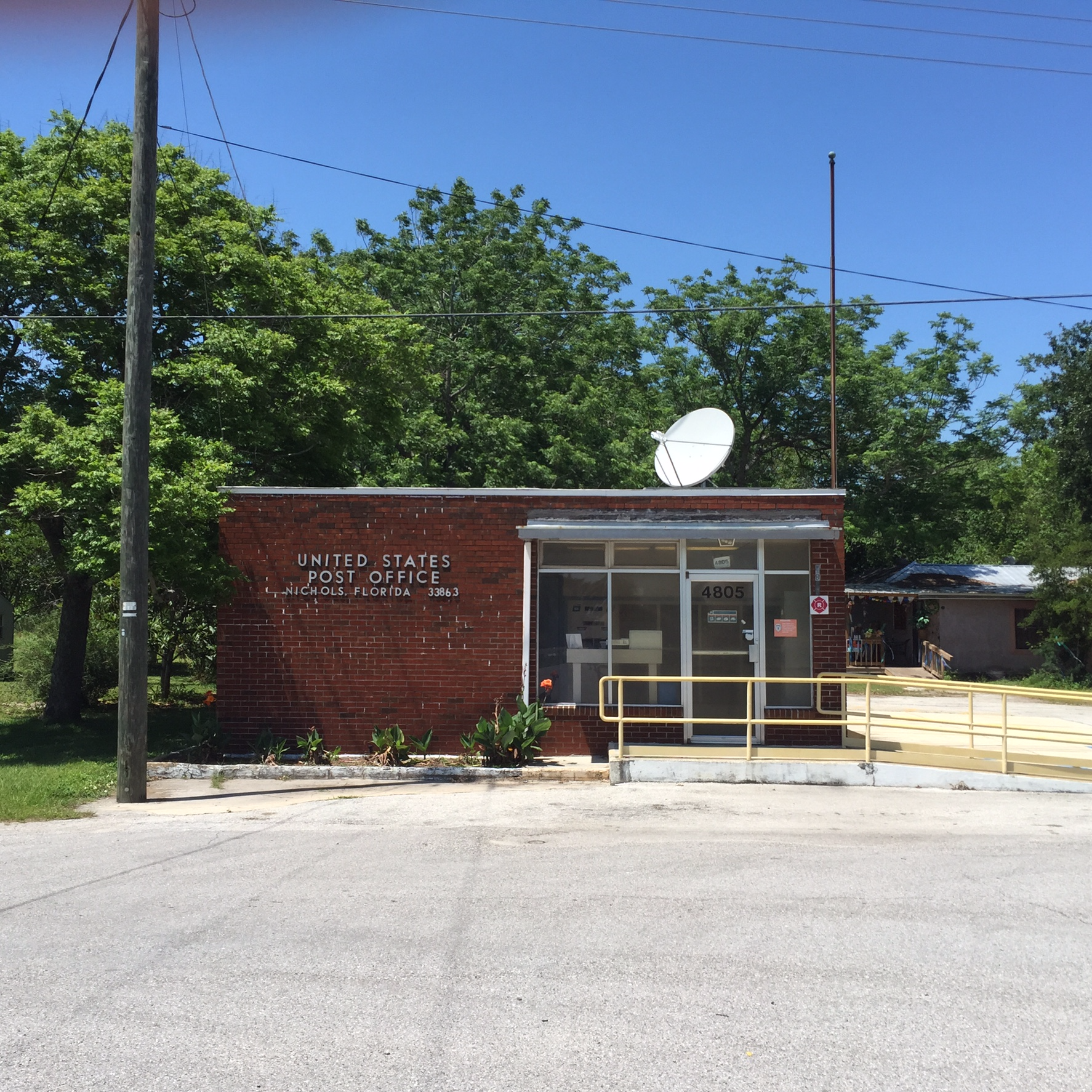
- The United States Post Office in Nichols

- Location within Florida Location within the United States
- Coordinates: 27°53′25″N 82°01′53″W
- Country: United States
- State: Florida
- County: Polk
- Elevation: 115 ft (35 m)
- Time zone: UTC-5 (Eastern (EST))
  - Summer (DST): UTC-4 (EDT)
- ZIP code: 33863
- Area code: 863
- GNIS feature ID: 294866

Nichols is an unincorporated community in Polk County, Florida, United States, located 11.4 miles (18.3 km) south-southwest of Lakeland. Nichols has a post office with ZIP code 33863. The community is located on the CSX Valrico Subdivision along Polk County Road 676, less than one mile south of Florida State Road 60.
