= Welcome, Florida =

Welcome
- Unincorporated community
- Location within the state of Florida
- Coordinates: 27°51′53″N 82°05′17″W
- Country: United States
- State: Florida
- County: Hillsborough
- Time zone: UTC-5 (Eastern (EST))
  - Summer (DST): UTC-4 (EDT)

Welcome, is an unincorporated community in southeastern Hillsborough County, Florida, United States, located a quarter mile south of Lithia-Pinecrest Road (Hillsborough County Road 640), two miles east of Pinecrest. Most of the town lies along or just to the west of Keysville Road (County Road 676). It is best known as the home of Alafia River State Park.

== History ==
Welcome was settled near the end of the 19th century. In 1905, the town was serviced by the Seaboard Railroad Line, but service was discontinued when the lumber supply was depleted in 1916.

== Education ==
The community of Welcome is served by Hillsborough County Schools. Students are zoned for Pinecrest Elementary, Turkey Creek Middle School and Durant High School.
