= Keysville, Florida =

- Unincorporated community
- Location within Florida Location within the United States
- Coordinates: 27°52′8″N 82°5′45″W
- Country: United States
- State: Florida
- County: Hillsborough
- Time zone: UTC-5 (Eastern (EST))
  - Summer (DST): UTC-4 (EDT)

Keysville is an unincorporated community in southeastern Hillsborough County, Florida, United States, adjacent to Lithia.

== Geography ==
Keysville is located at 27.9 degrees north, 82.1 degrees west (27.86889, -82.09583); or about 12 miles south of Plant City. The elevation for the community is 81 feet above sea level.

== History ==
Keysville was founded in the 1870s by Daniel McQueen Blue. It was named after the US postmaster general at the time, General David Key. In 1880, Keysville reached a population of over 500, making it the second largest community in the county, after Tampa. In the late nineteenth century it was served by passenger trains, but after the depletion of the timber resources, it declined. In the early 1900s the town experienced a small revival with the opening of numerous phosphate mines in the area.

== Education ==
The community of Keysville is served by Hillsborough County Schools.
