= Charlotte Harbor and Northern Railway =

Historic railroad in Florida

- Original Route

Overview
- Locale: Mulberry, Florida; Boca Grande, Florida
- Dates of operation: 1907–1925
- Successor: Seaboard Air Line Railway

Technical
- Track gauge: 4 ft 8 1/2 in (1,435 mm) standard gauge

The Charlotte Harbor and Northern Railway is a historic railroad line that at its greatest extent serviced Gasparilla Island in Charlotte Harbor and a major shipping port that once operated there. The railroad's principal purpose was to transport phosphate mined along the Peace River and in the Bone Valley region of Central Florida to the port to be shipped. It also brought passengers to the island community of Boca Grande on Gasparilla Island, and is largely responsible for making Boca Grande the popular tourist destination it is today. Part of the line remains in service today between Mulberry and Arcadia, which is now owned and operated by CSX Transportation. Today, it makes up CSX's Achan Subdivision and part of their Brewster Subdivision.

== Route ==
At its greatest extent, the Charlotte Harbor and Northern Railway ran from Mulberry to the southern tip of Gasparilla Island, a distance of nearly 100 miles. From Mulberry, the line proceeded south in a mostly straight trajectory through Bradley Junction, Fort Green Springs, and Ona to Arcadia.

What remains of the line today terminates in Arcadia, but historically it continued from Arcadia southwest, paralleling the Peace River and the adjacent Atlantic Coast Line Railroad (former Florida Southern Railway) through Nocatee and Fort Ogden. Near Fort Ogden, the line crossed the river and continued southwest into southeastern Sarasota County and Port Charlotte, where it ran alongside of what is today Raintree Boulevard, Veterans Boulevard, and State Road 776 (which has since been widened into the former right of way). It crossed the Myakka River in El Jobean and continued running south just northwest of what is today Gasparilla Road toward Placida and Gasparilla Island.

In Placida, the line crossed a causeway consisting of three major trestles onto Gasparilla Island, where it ran the length of the island and terminating at the Boca Grande port at the south end of the island near Port Boca Grande Lighthouse.

== History ==
=== Background ===
In the late 1800s, phosphate rock was discovered on the banks of the Peace River southwest of Arcadia. Shortly after, the Peace River Phosphate Company and other companies began phosphate mining operations in the area. The Peace River Phosphate Company built a narrow-gauge railroad along the banks of the river between Arcadia and Liverpool, just south of Fort Ogden. The phosphate industry led to Liverpool quickly becoming a phosphate mining town. A dock on the Peace River in Liverpool allowed for loading phosphate from rail cars on to barges for shipping.

In Arcadia, the Peace River Phosphate Company's railroad connected with the Florida Southern Railway. This allowed for some phosphate to be interchanged to the Florida Southern, who then transported it south to Punta Gorda to be loaded onto vessels at the Long Dock. The Florida Southern Railway converted its line to standard gauge in 1892, and the Peace River Phosphate Company also converted its line to standard gauge at the same time.

In 1892, Joseph Hull, whose company Comer & Hull owned the Charlotte Harbor Phosphate Company, acquired a portion of the Peace River Phosphate Company and its railroad. By 1894, Hull merged both companies, along with two other phosphate companies, into the Peace River Phosphate Mining Company. In 1899, the Peace River Phosphate Mining Company and other companies further north were merged into the American Agricultural Chemical Corporation (AACC).

After the acquisitions, AACC President Peter Bradley sought a location for a new port on the southwest coast of Florida to simplify the shipping of phosphate. The shallow waters of the Peace River in Liverpool limited the size of vessels that could be loaded there. The company identified Boca Grande Pass, a natural deepwater inlet at the south end of Gasparilla Island, as the perfect place for a deepwater port. The AACC, under Bradley's direction, then acquired the charter of the unbuilt Alafia, Manatee, and Gulf Coast Railroad, which had been chartered in 1897 with the authority to build a railroad from Plant City to Charlotte Harbor. After gaining the charter, Bradley changed its name to the Charlotte Harbor and Northern Railway.

=== Construction and early years ===
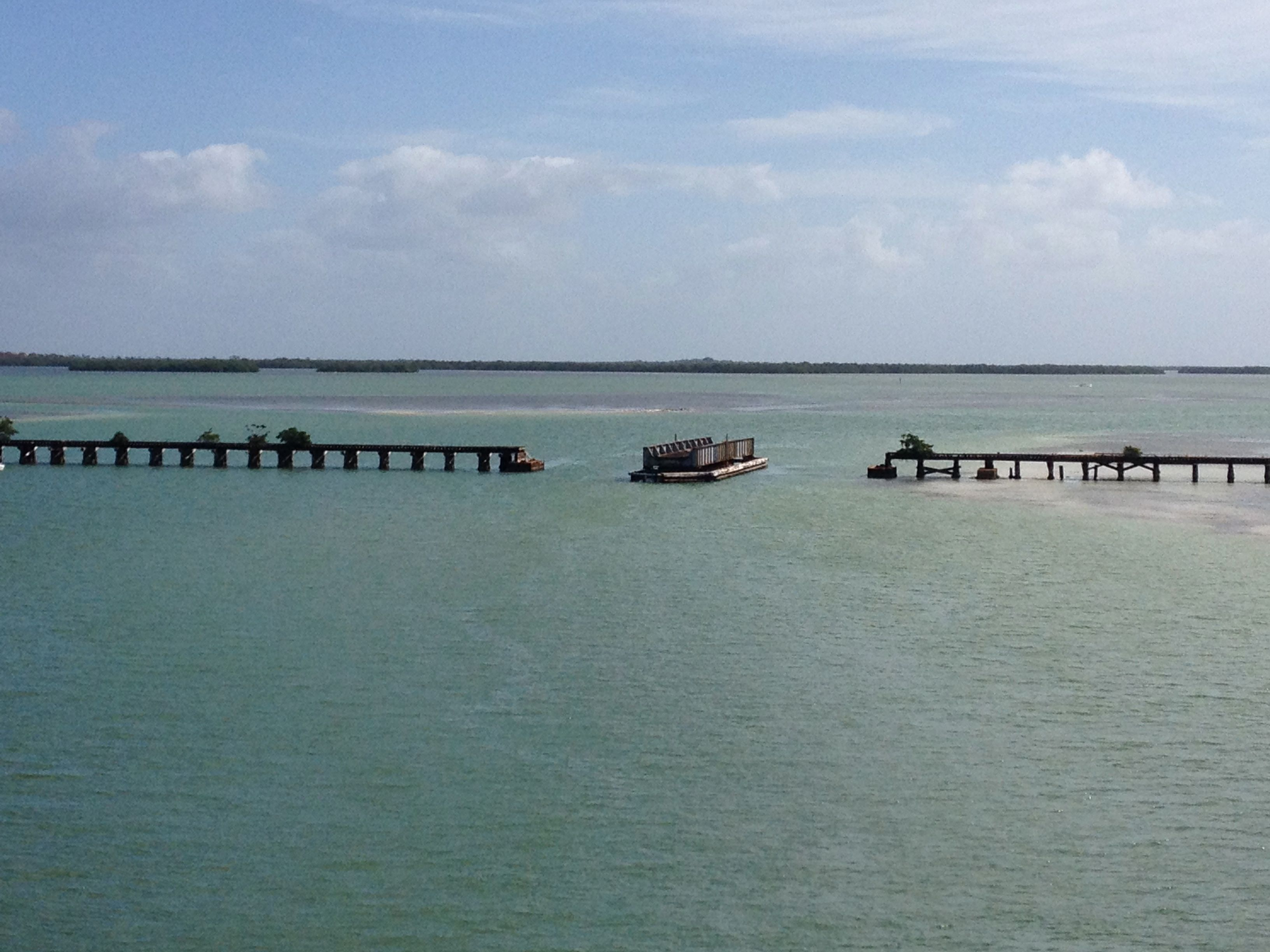
Swing bridge over Gasparilla Sound as seen in 2013.

In 1905, construction began on the Charlotte Harbor and Northern Railway from the port on Gasparilla Island to Fort Ogden. From Fort Ogden north to Arcadia, the Charlotte Harbor and Northern incorporated the pre-existing railroad built by the Peace River Phosphate Company with track south of Fort Ogden to Liverpool becoming a branch line. To connect Gasparilla Island to the mainland, a two-mile long causeway consisting of three trestles was built over Gasparilla Sound. The trestles contained two steel swing spans built by Virginia Iron Works to accommodate vessel traffic. Another major trestle was built over the Myakka River near Southland (later renamed El Jobean). Company repair shops were built in Arcadia. The Charlotte Harbor and Northern was officially complete from Port Boca Grande to Arcadia in June of 1907.

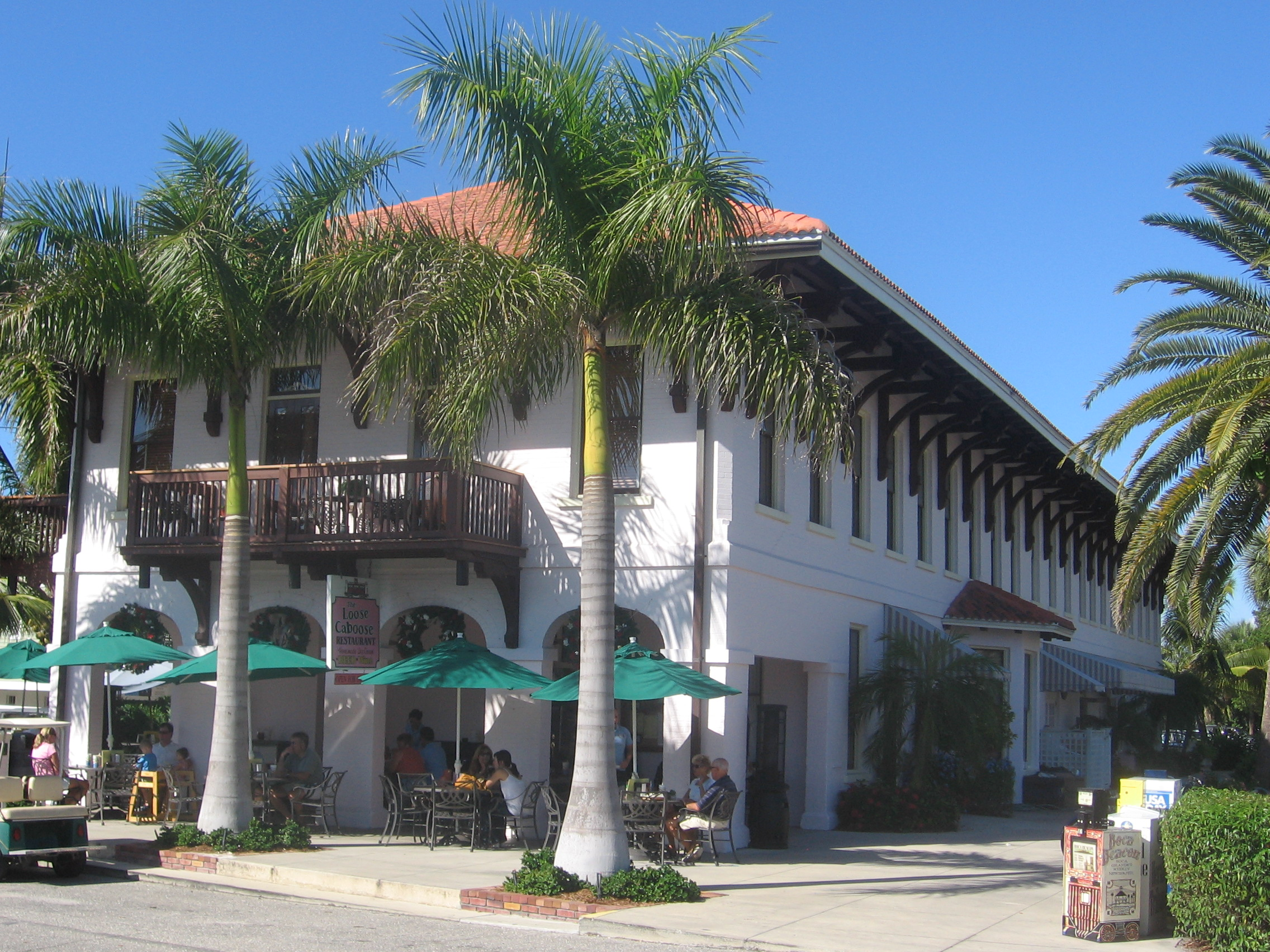
Historic passenger depot at Boca Grande built in 1910

In addition to transporting freight, the Charlotte Harbor and Northern also provided passenger service to Boca Grande. Three passenger depots existed on Gasparilla Island, with one at the north end of the island, one in downtown Boca Grande, and one at the port at the south end of the island where boat connections could be made to nearby Useppa Island and Pine Island. Initially, passengers were interchanged in Arcadia with the Atlantic Coast Line Railroad, which had acquired the former Florida Southern Railway in 1902.

The railroad would also invest in infrastructure in central Boca Grande, which would become famous for its world-class tarpon fishing. In 1907, Peter Bradley created the Boca Grande Land Company as a subsidiary to the AACC along with area landowners John Wall and Albert W. Gilchrist (the latter of whom would serve as the 20th Governor of Florida). The Boca Grande Land Company built homes and a golf course in Boca Grande. They also built the Gasparilla Inn, which was completed in 1911 and is still operating today.

In 1910, a two-story Mediterranean revival passenger depot was built in central Boca Grande replacing an earlier wooden structure. The upper floor of the depot, which still stands today, contained the Charlotte Harbor and Northern's corporate headquarters.

=== Extension north ===
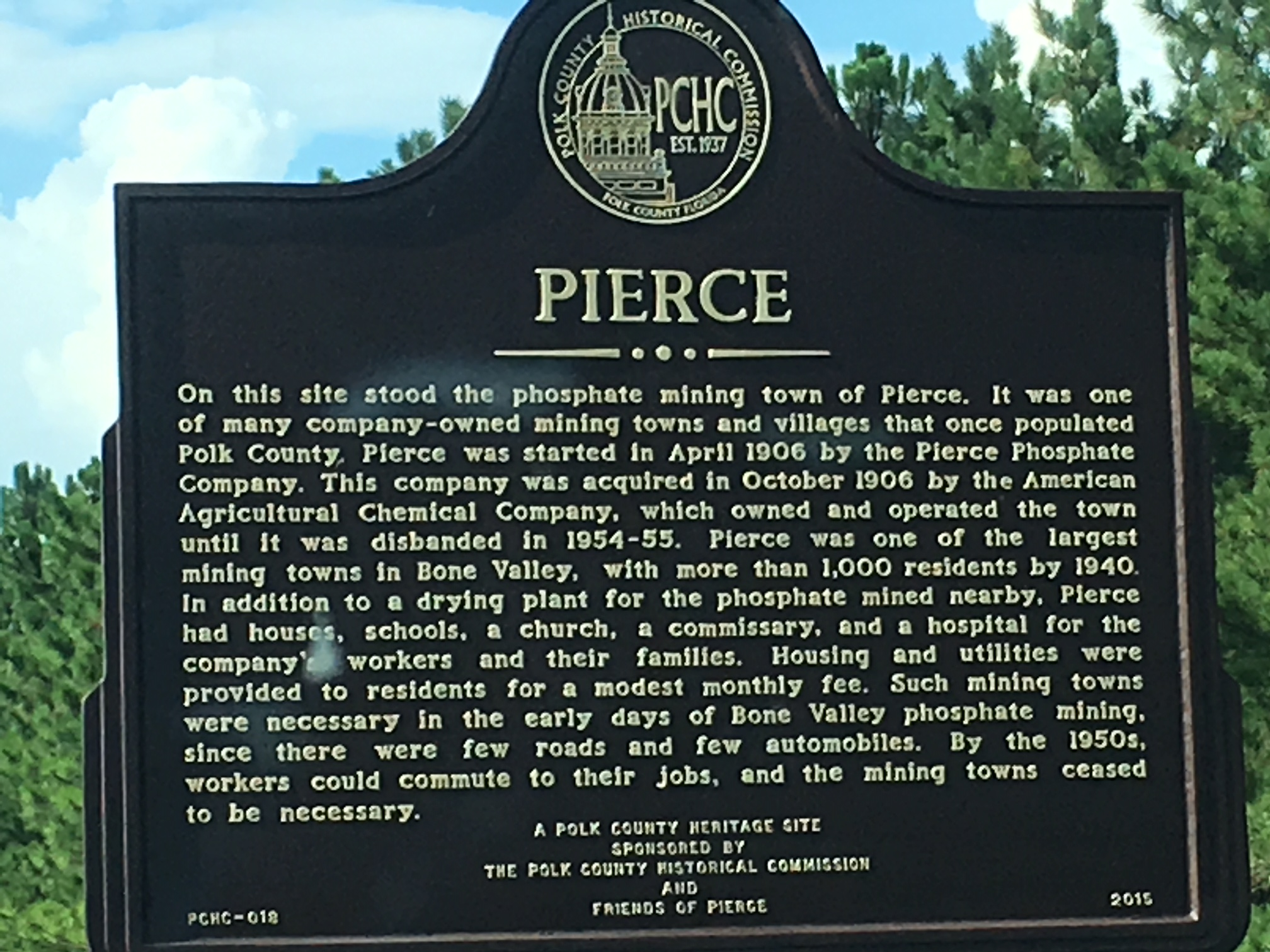
Historic marker for Pierce, Florida

Around the time the Charlotte Harbor and Northern Railway was completed from Boca Grande to Arcadia in 1907, much of the phosphate deposits on the lower Peace River had been depleted. By then, the AACC owned additional phosphate mines and facilities north of Arcadia as the phosphate industry moved further north. In 1909, work began to extend the Charlotte Harbor and Northern beyond Arcadia north through the Bone Valley to Mulberry to reach more facilities. By 1910, a nearly 40-mile stretch of the extension was complete, which connected to the Seaboard Air Line Railroad's newly built branch from Edison Junction to Agricola. The line's connection to the Seaboard Air Line would be named Bradley Junction after AACC President Peter Bradley. In addition to penetrating more phosphate-rich regions of the state, the extension provided a shorter route for passenger trains traveling between Boca Grande and Tampa.

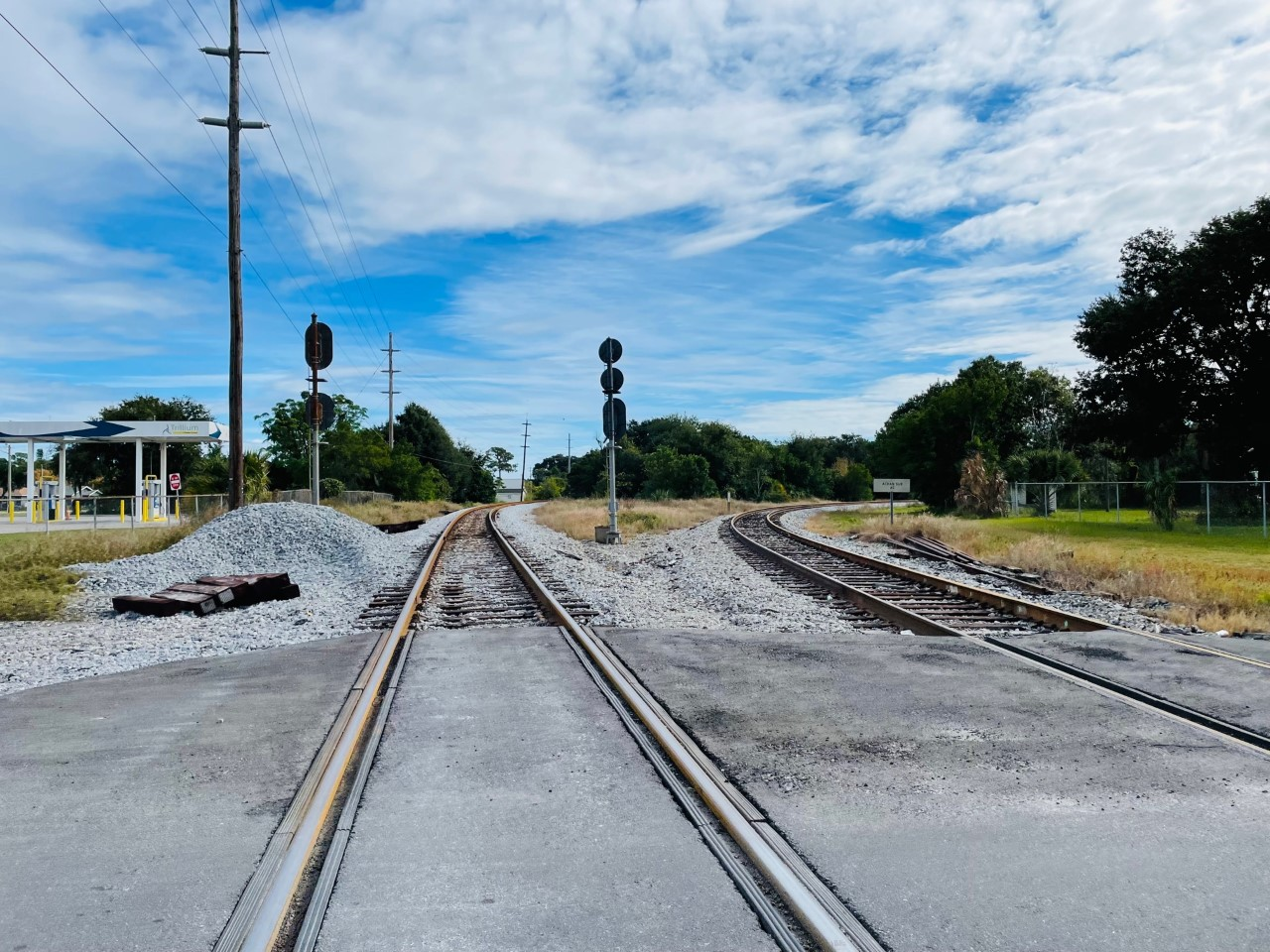
Northern terminus of the Charlotte Harbor and Northern Railway (right) in Mulberry as seen in 2021.

Just north of Bradley Junction was Pierce, a phosphate town run by the AACC. By then, Pierce was served by a spur of the Atlantic Coast Line Railroad's Bone Valley Branch. In early 1911, the Charlotte Harbor and Northern was extended north from Bradley Junction to Pierce, providing a direct connection to the town. By the end of 1911, the Charlotte Harbor and Northern was extended one last time to Mulberry. The extension ran beside the Atlantic Coast Line's spur before crossing their Bone Valley Branch at Bruce (later known as Achan). It then proceeded north to Mulberry, where it terminated at a connection with the Seaboard Air Line's route that would later be known as their Valrico Subdivision.

The Palmetto Phosphate Company would build a spur from the Charlotte Harbor and Northern at Cottman east to its facility at Tiger Bay (near Fort Meade) in 1911. This spur was sold to the Charlotte Harbor and Northern Railway in 1913. Another short-lived spur from Achan to Ridgewood was also built in 1913.

From 1913 to 1952, the Charlotte Harbor and Northern Railway operated a creosote treatment facility in Hull on the site of the former phosphate plant. Some railroad ties and timbers produced from this facility were used to maintain the railroad and its infrastructure while others were sold to other railroads.

By the early 1920s, the branch to Liverpool was abandoned.

=== The Legend of José Gaspar ===
In the early 1900s, the Railway produced an advertising brochure for its Gasparilla Inn near the end of the line on Gasparilla Island that claimed that the area was once home to José Gaspar, a renegade Spanish pirate who was supposedly based in Charlotte Harbor when Florida was still Spanish territory. The brochure claimed that Gaspar had been the most feared buccaneer of his generation during his 40-year career spent ravaging shipping and taking hostages across the Gulf of Mexico to the Spanish Main, that he named most of the islands in the Charlotte Harbor area, and had left an as-yet undiscovered treasure cache in the vicinity of the Gasparilla Inn upon his dramatic death in battle. The tale was unsupported by any evidence, and Pat Lemoyne, the publicist who wrote it, freely admitted in later years that "there was not a true fact in it" and that it was simply an advertisement written in the style of a romantic adventure to attract the attention of tourists. Still, the colorful legend of Gaspar presented in the brochure helped inspire the annual Gasparilla Pirate Festival in nearby Tampa and has led to ongoing confusion as to Gaspar's historic authenticity.

=== 1925-1967: Seaboard Air Line ownership ===
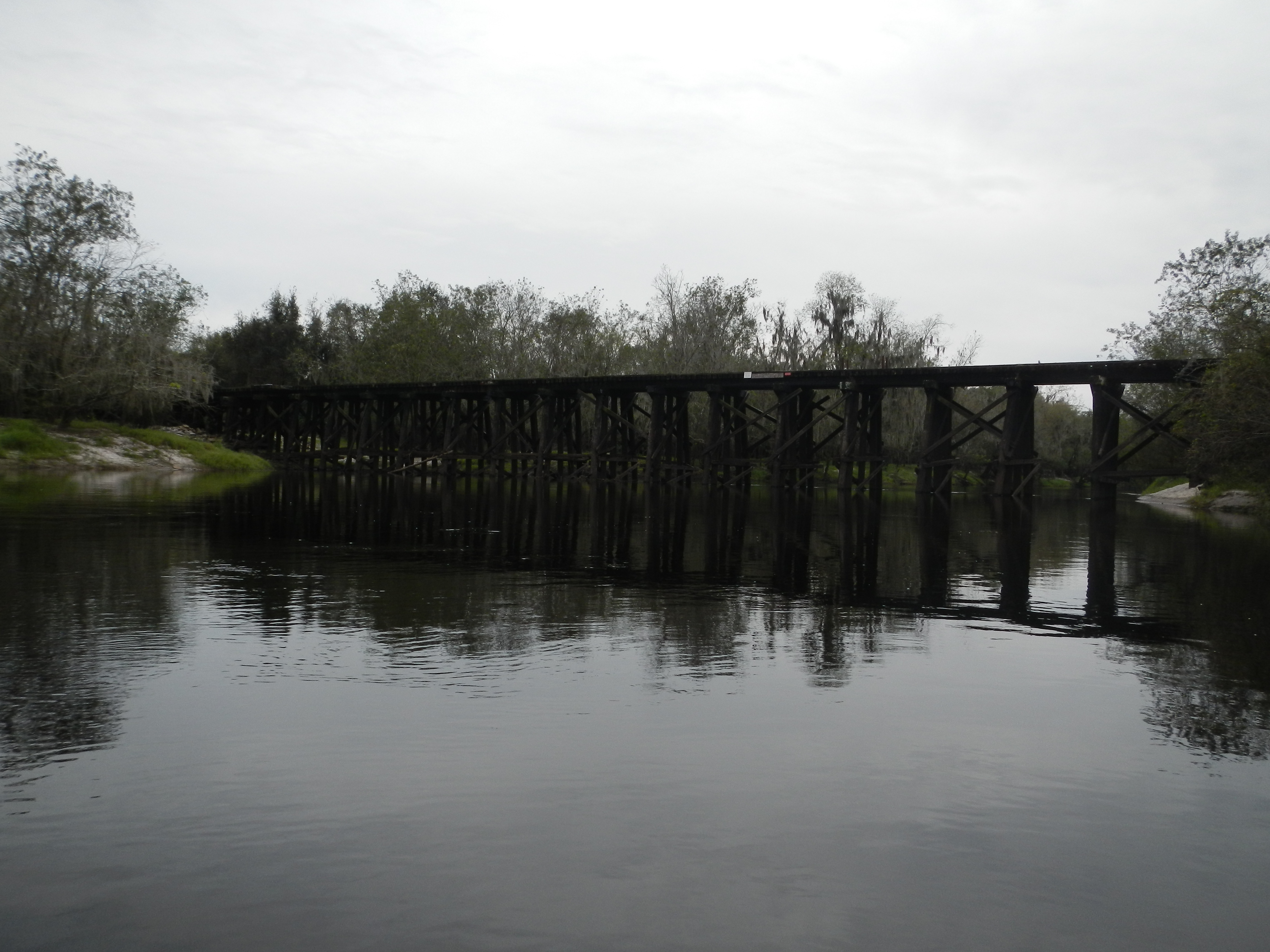
Bridge over Peace River near Arcadia

In 1925, the line was leased by the Seaboard Air Line Railroad, who then fully purchased the line from the American Agricultural Chemicals Company a year later. This gave Seaboard direct access to the Boca Grande port. Almost immediately after the purchase, Seaboard began construction of its Fort Myers Subdivision, which branched off the line at Hull (near Fort Ogden) and ran south to Fort Myers and Naples. That route was completed in 1927 but was abandoned by 1952.

The line became part of the Seaboard Air Line's Agricola Subdivision (later renamed the Achan Subdivision) north of Bradley Junction and the Boca Grande Subdivision south of there. Seaboard continued to provided service on the line to both Boca Grande as well as to Fort Myers and Naples when the Fort Myers Subdivision was active. By 1940, two daily local passenger trains were running the line to Boca Grande. Passenger service to Boca Grande was discontinued in 1958 shortly after the opening of the Boca Grande Causeway, which was the last passenger service to ever operate on the line.

=== Later years ===
The Seaboard Air Line Railroad merged with the Atlantic Coast Line Railroad in 1967. The merged company became the Seaboard Coast Line Railroad.

By 1969, Port Boca Grande was ranked as the fourth busiest port in Florida.

In 1972, the swing span on the northern trestle over Gasparilla Sound near Placida was replaced with a bascule span. The installation of the bascule span was done in conjunction with a slight realignment of the navigation channel underneath.

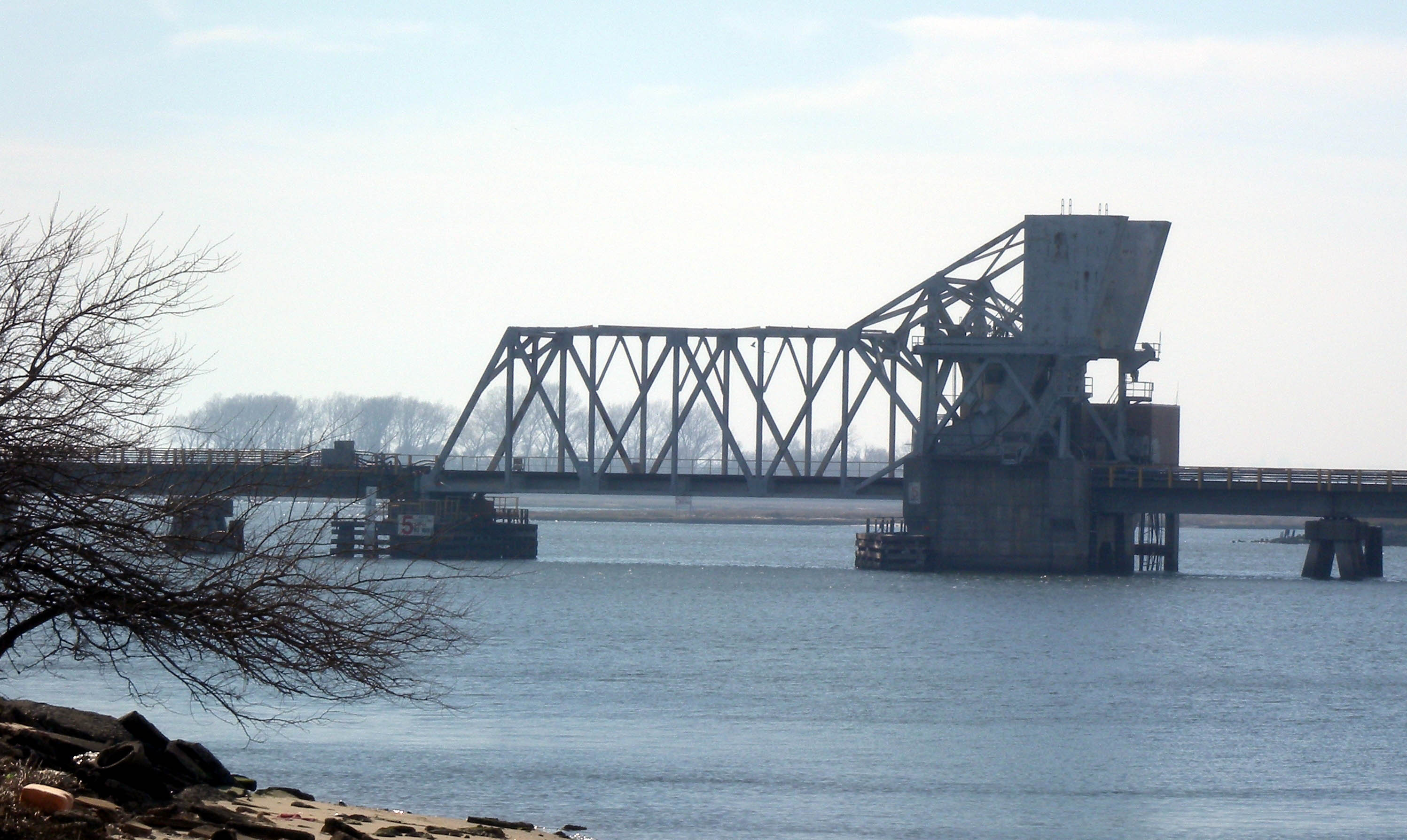
Former Gasparilla Sound bascule span after its relocation to Long Beach, New York

In the mid 1970s, increased competition from the Rockport Terminal in the Tampa Bay area and Port Manatee in Manatee County led to a decline in traffic to Port Boca Grande and the port fully closed 1979. Due to the closure of the port, the Seaboard Coast Line (which was in the process of being merged into CSX Transportation at the time) abandoned and removed the line from the port to just south of Arcadia in 1981.

After the abandonment, the bascule span over Gasparilla Sound was sold to the Long Island Rail Road in 1986. The Long Island Rail Road installed it on the rebuilt Wreck Lead Bridge over Reynolds Creek on their Long Beach Branch where it is still operating today.

== Current conditions ==
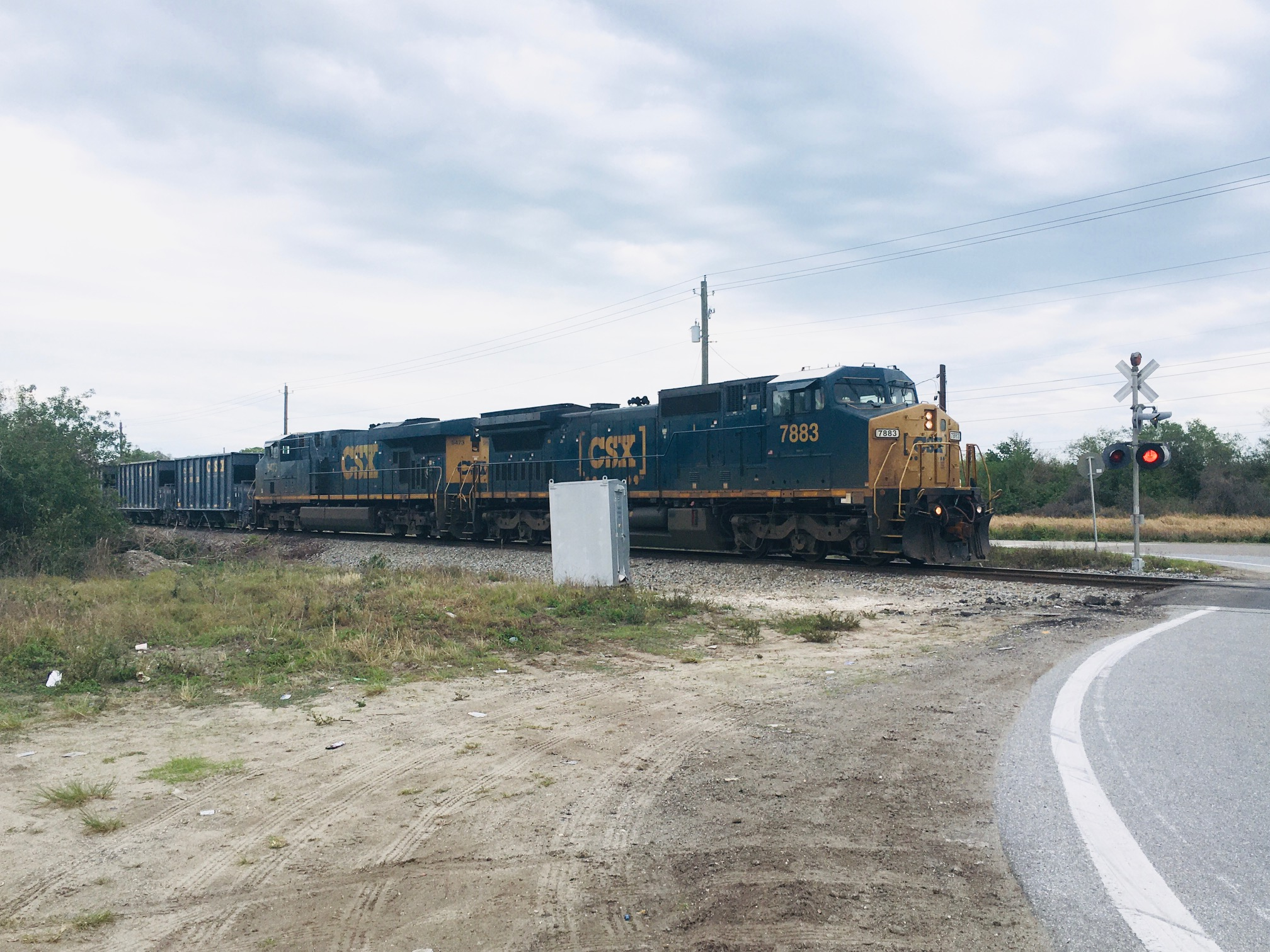
Empty phosphate train on the still-active segment of the Charlotte Harbor and Northern Railway near Agrock Yard in 2020

As of 2025, the track between Mulberry and Arcadia is the only active track remaining of the Charlotte Harbor and Northern Railway. The northernmost seven miles of the line (between Mulberry and Bradley Junction) still operates as CSX's Achan Subdivision. Track from Bradley Junction to just north of Arcadia (along with former Seaboard track from Bradley Junction west to Edison Junction) is now part of CSX's Brewster Subdivision. Seminole Gulf Railway owns the southernmost four miles of the remaining line in Arcadia, who also operates the connecting ex-ACL route south to Punta Gorda and Fort Myers.

=== South of Arcadia ===
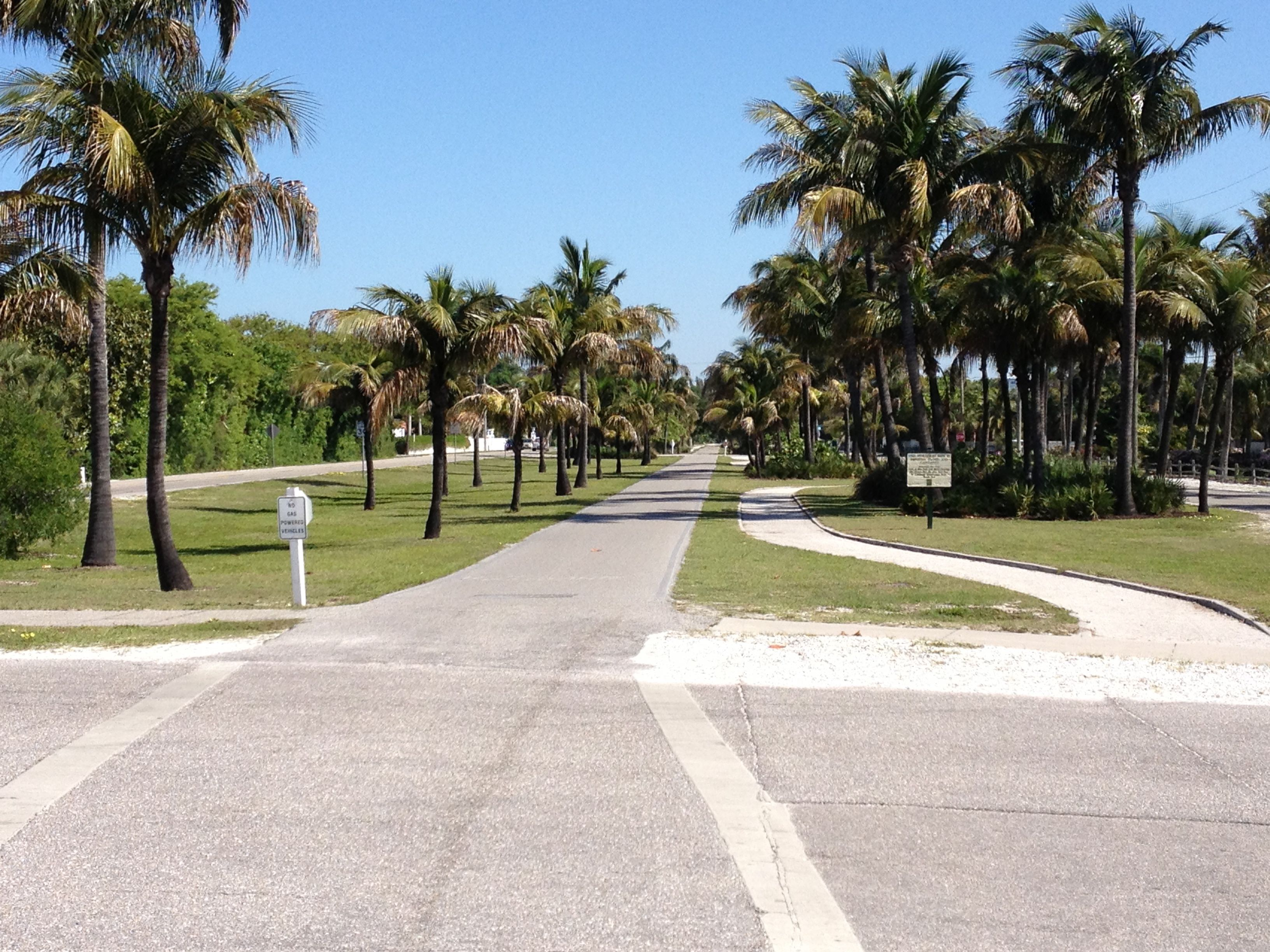
Boca Grande Bike Trail on former right of way on Gasparilla Island

Despite its abandonment in 1981, evidence of the line south of Arcadia can still be found on Gasparilla Island and Charlotte County. Most of the right of way on Gasparilla Island was purchased by a local entrepreneur and converted into the popular Boca Grande Bike Path in 1985, which was the first rail trail in the state of Florida. The Cape Haze Pioneer Trail was later built on the right of way between western Port Charlotte and Placida in the mid-2000s.

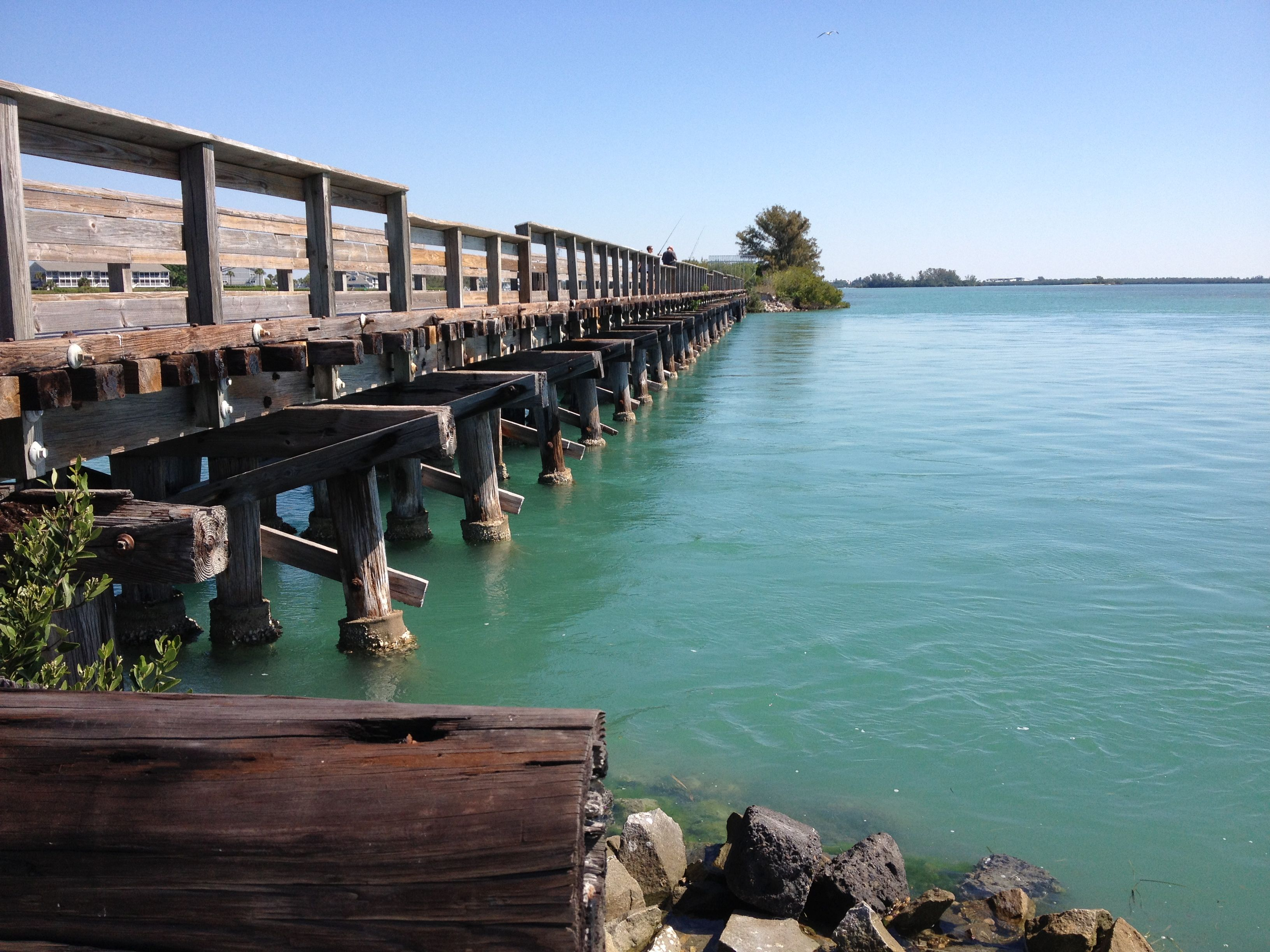
Southernmost Gasparilla Island trestle. It has since been converted to a fishing pier.

The most substantial remnant of the line is the historic Boca Grande passenger depot at Park and 4th Streets, which is listed on the U.S. National Register of Historic Places. The depot was restored in the 1970s and today houses shops and a restaurant.

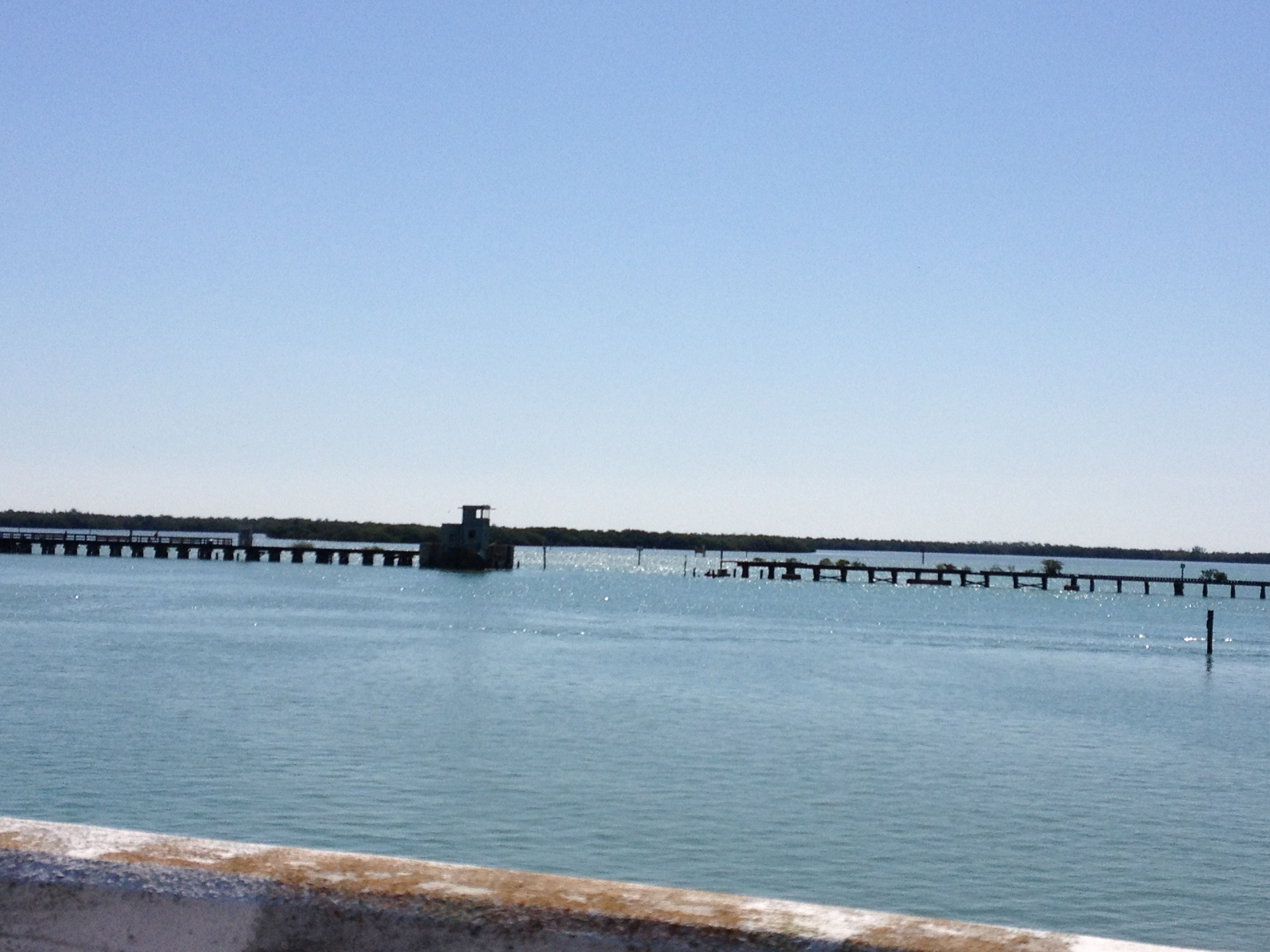
Abandoned drawbridge tower on the former bascule bridge over Gasparilla Sound

A number of bridges along the abandoned route also remain to this day as well, the most notable of which is the causeway over Gasparilla Sound that connected the line to the island. The southernmost trestle is now a fishing pier as is the northernmost trestle up to the abandoned drawbridge tower. The rest of the causeway and trestles, which remain just to the south of the Boca Grande Causeway, are now completely abandoned. The center trestle's swing span is still in place and is locked open to facilitate boat traffic.

Other remaining bridges include trestles over the Myakka River and Coral Creek, which have been converted into fishing piers.

== Historic stations ==
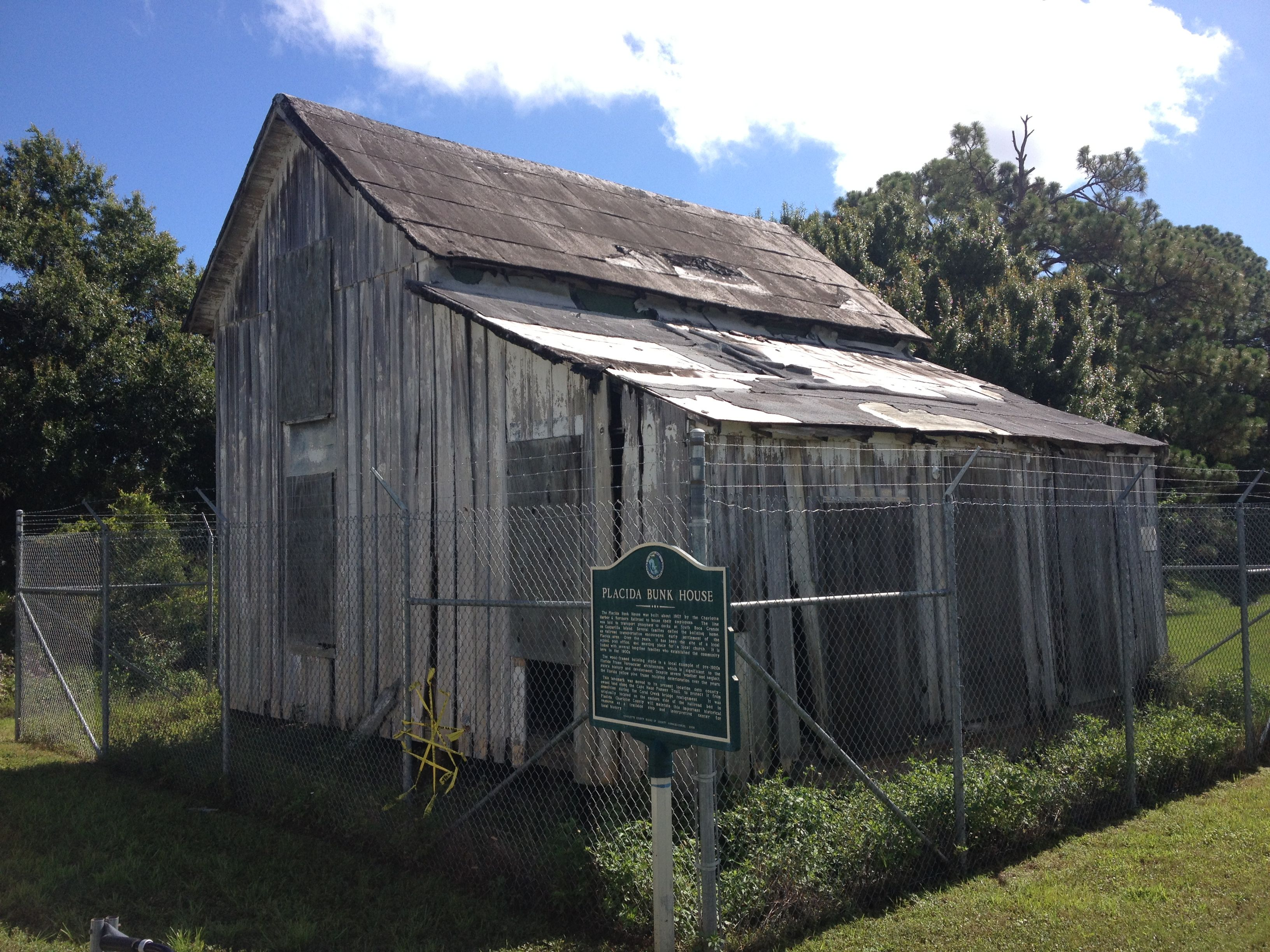
Placida Bunk House was built by the railroad to house their employees and originally stood in Placida. It now resides at the Cape Haze Pioneer Trail's Mercer trailhead.

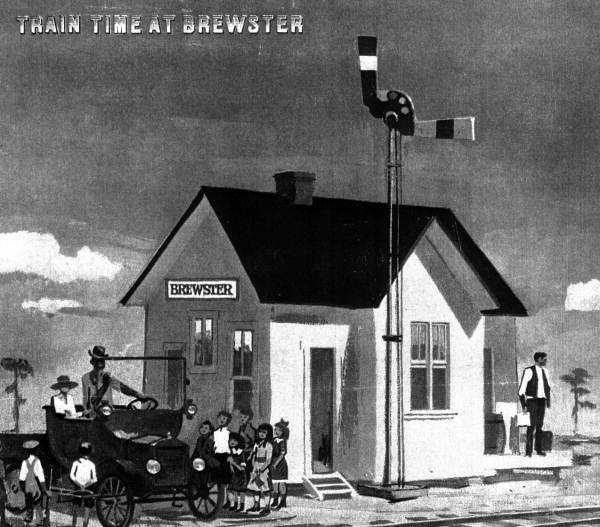
Artist rendering of the former Brewster Depot

Miles from S. Boca Grande	City/Location	Station	Opening date	Connections and notes
0.0	Gasparilla Island	South Boca Grande	1907	Boat connections to Useppa Island and Pine Island at Port Boca Grande
2.3	Gasparilla Island	Boca Grande	1907	
5.3	Gasparilla Island	Gasparilla	1907	
10.0		Placida	1907	
17.6		McCall	1907	later renamed Charlotte Beach
19.9	El Jobean	El Jobean	1907	originally Southland
26.5	Port Charlotte	Murdock	1907	
28.5		Mars	1907	
36.9		Platt	1907	junction with Tampa Southern Railroad (ACL)
38.8		Boggess	1907	
39.9	Fort Ogden	Fort Ogden	1907	
42.6	Hull	Hull	1907	
47.0	Nocatee	Nocatee	1907	
52.9	Arcadia	Arcadia	1907	junction with East and West Coast Railway (SAL) connection to Atlantic Coast Line Railroad Lakeland—Fort Myers Line
54.7		Bunker-Lansing	1910	
60.4		Kinsey	1910	
61.9		Limestone	1910	
65.1		Bridges	1910	
69.9	Ona	Ona	1910	
77.7	Fort Green Springs	Fort Green Springs	1910	
79.8	Fort Green	Fort Green	1910	
80.3		Fort Green Junction	1910	
84.8		Baird	1910	later known as Agrock
86.3		Cottmann	1910	junction with spur to Tiger Bay
89.3	Brewster	Brewster	1910	originally Chicora
92.1	Bradley Junction	Bradley Junction	1910	junction with Seaboard Air Line Railroad Agricola Branch
93.3		Pierce	1911	
96.8		Achan	1911	originally Bruce junction with: spur to Ridgewood; Atlantic Coast Line Railroad Bone Valley Branch
98.9	Mulberry	Mulberry	1911	junction with Seaboard Air Line Railroad Valrico Subdivision
