= Achan Subdivision =

CSX railroad line in Florida

The Achan Subdivision is a short railroad line operated by CSX Transportation located in Polk County, Florida in a region known as the Bone Valley. The seven-mile line links central Mulberry, Florida with CSX's Bone Valley network to the south.

== Route description ==
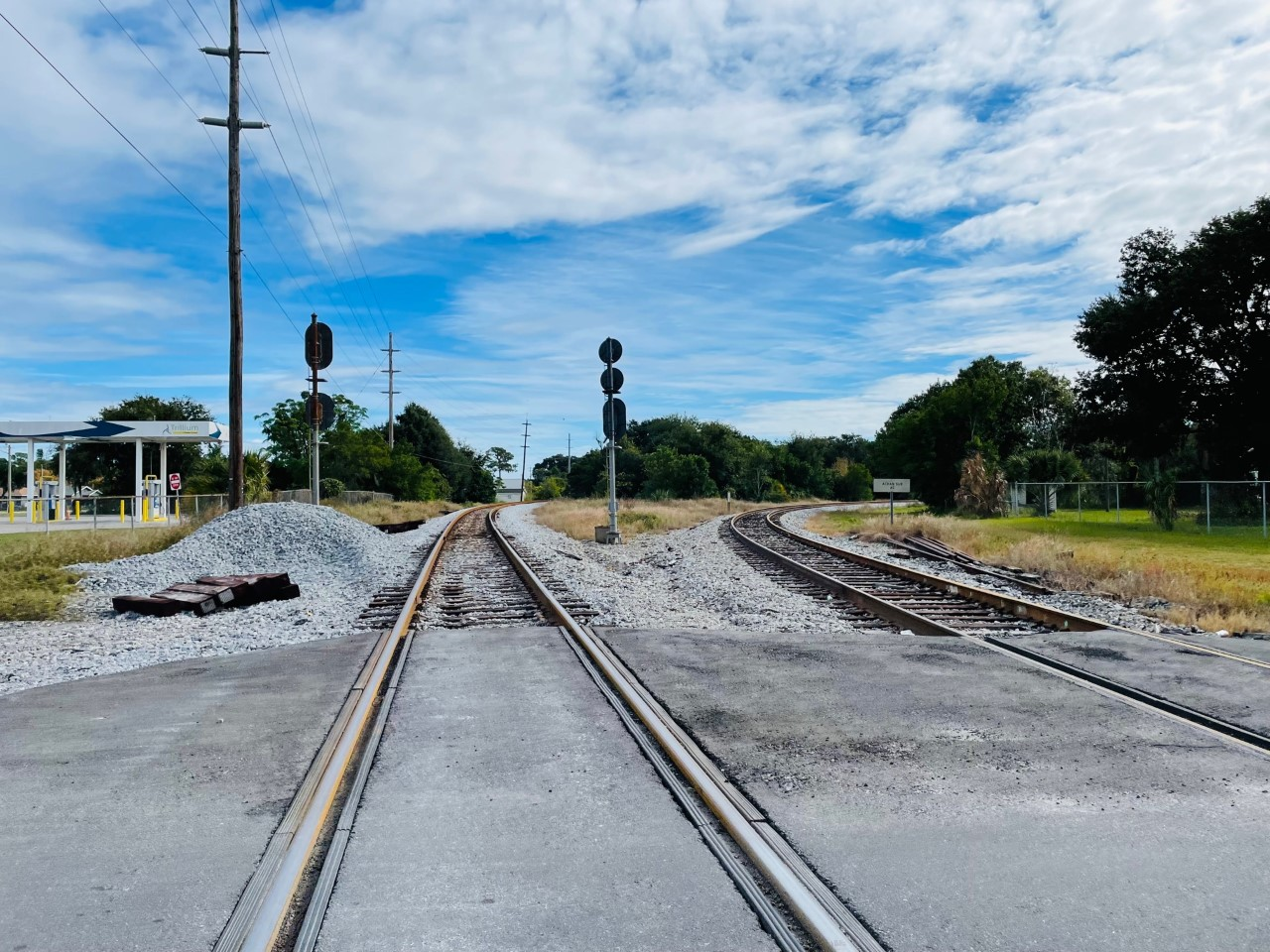
Achan Subdivision's junction with the Valrico Subdivision in Mulberry, Florida

The Achan Subdivision at a wye with the Valrico Subdivision just east of Downtown Mulberry. It heads south seven miles to Bradley Junction, where it connects with the Brewster Subdivision and the Agricola Spur. The Agricola Spur runs from Bradley Junction east to Agricola. The Achan Subdivision also connects with the Bone Valley Subdivision in Achan (about halfway between Mulberry and Bradley Junction).

== History ==
The Achan Subdivision was originally the northernmost segment of the Charlotte Harbor and Northern Railway (CH&N), which at its greatest extent ran from Mulberry south to Port Boca Grande on Gasparilla Island. The CH&N was extended from Bradley Junction to Mulberry in 1911. A spur was also built from Achan northeast to Ridgewood. The extended line would also serve the now defunct town of Pierce, a town built to house workers of the American Agricultural Chemicals Company, which built and owned the Charlotte Harbor and Northern Railway. Pierce was also the location of a phosphate drying plant. At Bradley Junction, the CH&N crossed the Seaboard Air Line Railroad's branch from present-day Edison Junction to Agricola, which was built in 1910. Agricola was a phosphate town built in 1907.

The Seaboard Air Line Railroad bought the Charlotte Harbor and Northern Railway in 1926. After the acquisition, the Seaboard Air Line designated the former CH&N from Mulberry to Bradley Junction and Seaboard-built track from Bradley Junction to Agricola as the Agricola Subdivision. Track west of Bradley Junction to Edison Junction and south to Port Boca Grande was briefly known as the Fort Myers Subdivision but was later known as the Boca Grande Subdivision. The town of Agricola declined in the 1950s and by the 1960s, the line from Bradley Junction to South Mulberry was renamed the Achan Subdivision and the segment from Bradley Junction to Agricola was downgraded to spur status as it is today.

In 1967, the Seaboard Air Line and the Atlantic Coast Line merged to form the Seaboard Coast Line Railroad. In 1980, the Seaboard Coast Line's parent company merged with the Chessie System, creating the CSX Corporation. The CSX Corporation initially operated the Chessie and Seaboard Systems separately until 1986, when they were merged into CSX Transportation.

== Historic Seaboard Air Line stations ==
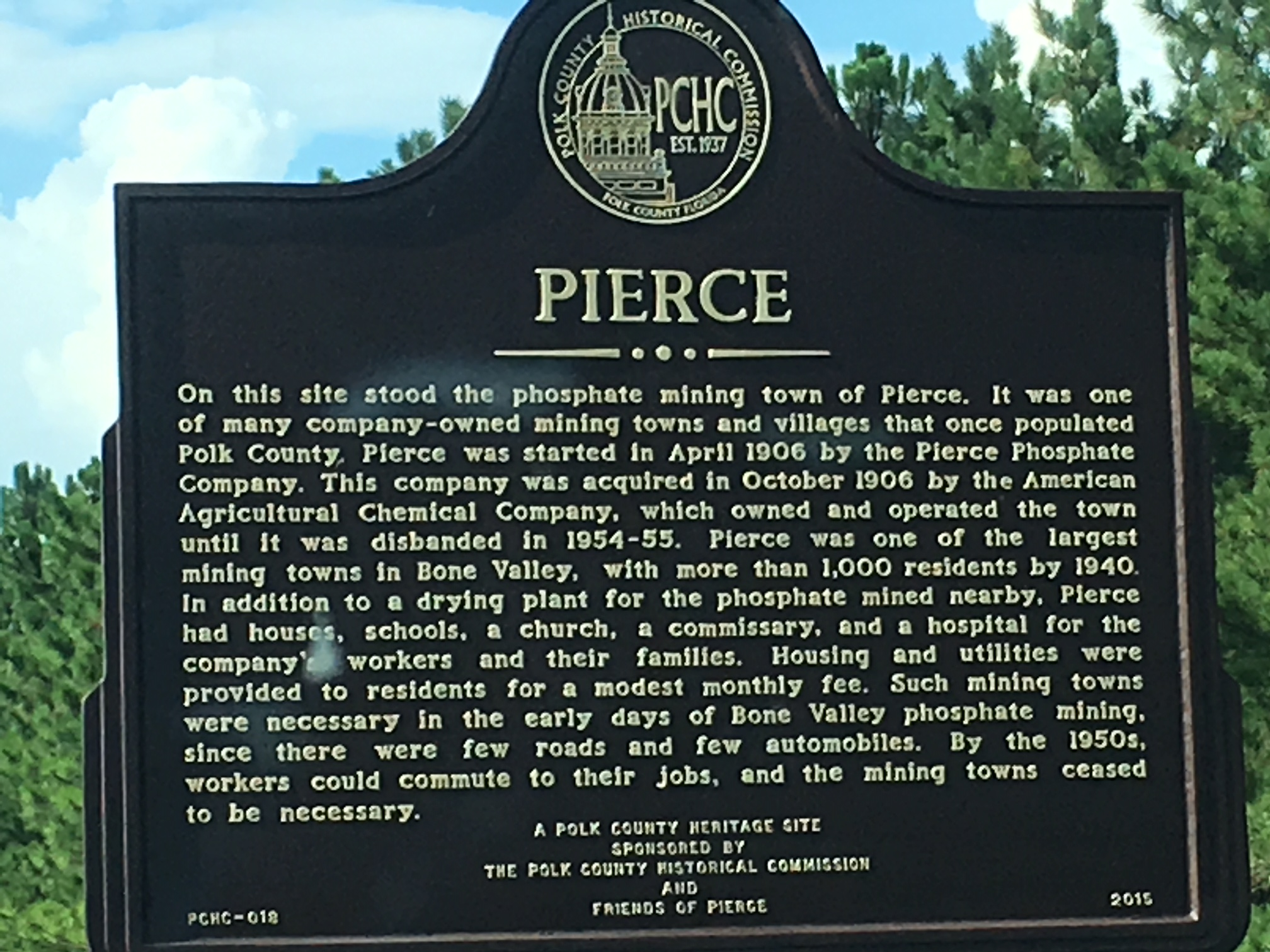
Historic marker for Pierce, Florida, located along the Achan Subdivision

Bradley Junction to South Mulberry
Milepost	City/Location	Station	Connections and notes
SVH 0.0	Bradley Junction	Bradley Junction	junction with Seaboard Air Line Railroad Boca Grande Subdivision & Agricola Spur
SVH 2.6		Pierce	
SVH 4.4		Achan	originally Bruce junction with Atlantic Coast Line Railroad Bone Valley Branch
SVH 7.1	Mulberry	South Mulberry	junction with Seaboard Air Line Railroad Valrico Subdivision

Agricola Spur
Milepost (Note: Milepost numbers on the Agricola Spur continue from the Brewster Subdivision. In the 1920s, the Seaboard Air Line assigned the prefix VH to track from Bradley Junction to Mulberry and VHA to track from Bradley Junction to Agricola. When the Seaboard Air Line merged with the Atlantic Coast Line Railroad in 1967, S was added to the beginning of the prefixes to differentiate them from the Atlantic Coast Line's routes. The Agricola Spur's prefix was changed to SVN as it is today.)	City/Location	Station	Connections and notes
SVN 843.3	Bradley Junction	Bradley Junction	junction with Achan Subdivision & Boca Grande Subdivision
SVN 847.4		McDowell	
SVN 848.9	Agricola	Agricola	connection to Atlantic Coast Line Railroad Bone Valley Branch
SVN 852.4		Rockland	
