= Brewster Subdivision =

CSX railroad line in Florida

The Brewster Subdivision is a railroad line owned by CSX Transportation in Florida. The line runs from Edison Junction (just west of Mulberry south through Bradley Junction to a point just north of Arcadia for a total of 47.2 miles. Prior to 1981, the line was known as the Boca Grande Subdivision when the line continued beyond Arcadia as far as Port Boca Grande on the south end of Gasparilla Island.

== Route description ==
The Brewster Subdivision begins at Edison Junction near the community of Keysville at a wye that branches off the company's Valrico Subdivision. From Edison, it proceeds southeast to Bradley Junction. At Bradley Junction, the line connects with the Achan Subdivision to the north and the Agricola Spur to the east., and connects to the Seminole Gulf Railway in Arcadia.

The Brewster Subdivision continues south from Bradley Junction through Agrock, Fort Green Springs, and Ona before coming to its southern terminus at point just north of Arcadia. Track from the terminus south into Arcadia is now owned by Seminole Gulf Railway, a shortline that continues south from Arcadia to Punta Gorda and Fort Myers on the Atlantic Coast Line Railroad's former Lakeland—Fort Myers Line.

Historically, the line continued southwest from Arcadia along the Peace River to a point near Fort Ogden where it crossed the river. From here, it continued southwest through Port Charlotte, El Jobean, and Placida to Gasparilla Island.

== Operation ==
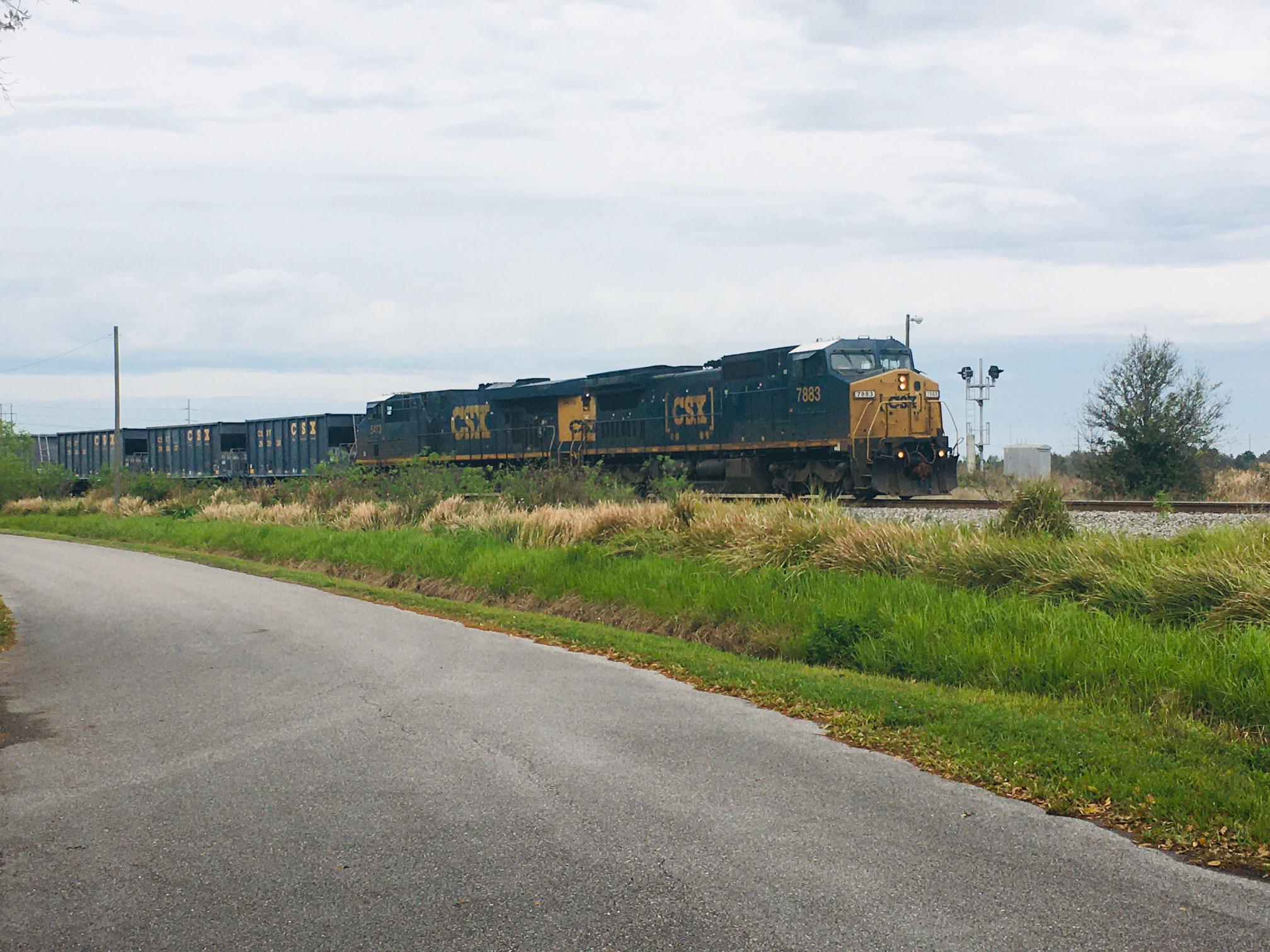
Train K343 on the turn at Bradley Junction heading from New Wales to Agrock.

The Brewster Subdivision is CSX's second busiest line through the Bone Valley after the Valrico Subdivision. The line is dispatched through Track warrant control.

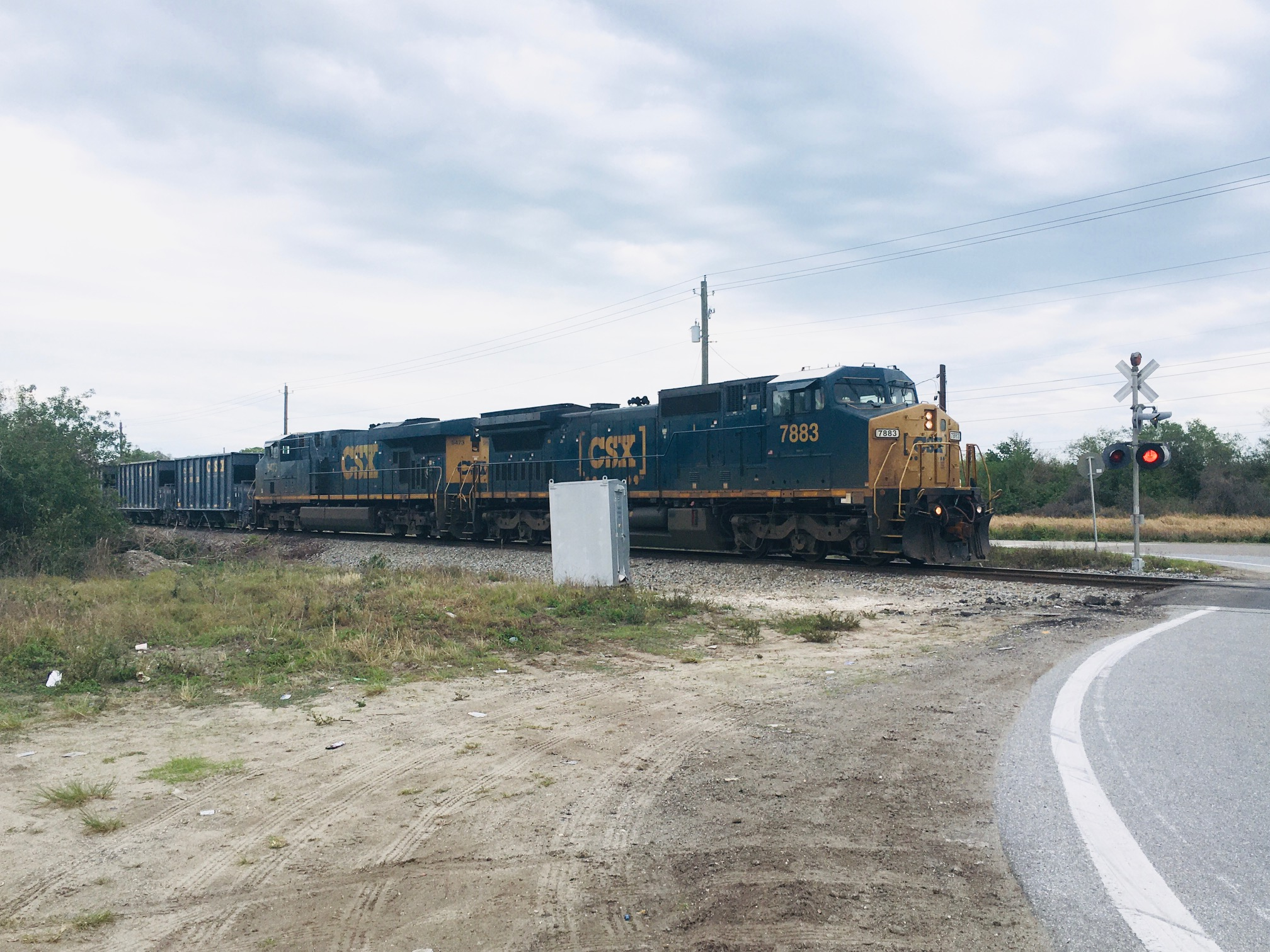
Empty phosphate train approaching Agrock Yard

The line serves three phosphate facilities operated by The Mosaic Company. Mosaic's New Wales processing plant is located near the north end of the line between Edison and Bradley Junction and is considered by Mosaic to be the world's largest phosphate processing facility. Four Corners Mine is located a short distance behind Agrock yard south of Bradley Junction. Agrock yard is used by Mosaic as a staging area for Four Corners Mine and operates their own locomotives and equipment from the mine to the yard.

The southernmost phosphate mine on the line is Mosaic's South Pasture Mine in Fort Green Springs which was previously operated by CF Industries before it was bought by Mosaic. South Pasture Mine is currently not operating and has been idle since 2018. Though Mosaic plans to reactivate it at some point in the future. When active, South Pasture is the southernmost point of CSX's Bone Valley operations.

The only traffic on the Brewster Subdivision that runs south of South Pasture is twice-weekly mixed freight from Winston Yard to Arcadia for interchange with Seminole Gulf Railway. This traffic is the only non-phosphate related rail traffic on the Brewster Subdivision.

== History ==
Boca Grande Subdivision

Overview
- Status: Some segments still operating
- Owner: Seaboard Air Line Railroad
- Termini: Edison Junction; Port Boca Grande

Technical
- Track gauge: 1,435 mm (4 ft 8 1/2 in) standard gauge
- Electrification: No
- Signalling: None
Route map
Boca Grande Subdivision at its greatest extent

=== Edison to Agricola ===
The northern segment of the Brewster Subdivision from present-day Edison to Bradley Junction and east to Agricola was built as a branch line by the Seaboard Air Line Railroad in 1910. It was built to further extend the Seaboard Air Line's network into the Bone Valley's growing phosphate industry.

=== South of Bradley Junction ===
The Brewster Subdivision south of Bradley Junction was originally built by the Charlotte Harbor and Northern Railway (CH&N). The CH&N was owned by the American Agricultural Chemical Corporation (AACC) and at its greatest extent, it ran from Port Boca Grande to Mulberry via Arcadia and Bradley Junction. It was built from Boca Grande to Arcadia in 1907 and extended north to Bradley Junction in 1910 and to Mulberry in 1911. Bradley Junction was named after AACC President Peter B. Bradley.

=== Consolidation ===
The Seaboard Air Line named Edison Junction after inventor Thomas Edison. The Seaboard named it after Edison because they had planned to use the junction to launch an expansion southwest to Fort Myers where Edison had a winter home (the Edison and Ford Winter Estates). However, the nearly simultaneous construction of the Charlotte Harbor and Northern Railway led to the two railroads making a deal to avoid having competing tracks through the area. In 1925, the Seaboard Air Line leased the Charlotte Harbor and Northern and fully acquired it from the AACC the following year. This expanded the Seaboard’s network further south and provided access to Port Boca Grande. Almost immediately after the acquisition of the Charlotte Harbor and Northern was complete, the Seaboard began construction of a branch from the line at Hull south to Fort Myers and Naples.

For many years, the Seaboard Air Line designated the line from Edison Junction to Port Boca Grande via Bradley Junction as the Boca Grande Subdivision. Former CH&N track north of Bradley Junction was known as the Agricola Subdivision (which was later renamed the Achan Subdivision).

=== Later years ===
The Seaboard Air Line operated passenger trains on the line to both Boca Grande and to Fort Myers and Naples (the latter destinations were provided by Orange Blossom Special and West Coast Limited). Passenger service to Fort Myers ended in 1933 and the Fort Myers Subdivision was completely abandoned by 1952. The Seaboard Air Line generally operated two passenger trains a day to Boca Grande, though by 1951, only one daily passenger train was running. Passenger service to Boca Grande was discontinued in 1958 shortly after the opening of the Boca Grande Causeway, which was the last regular passenger service to ever operate on the line.

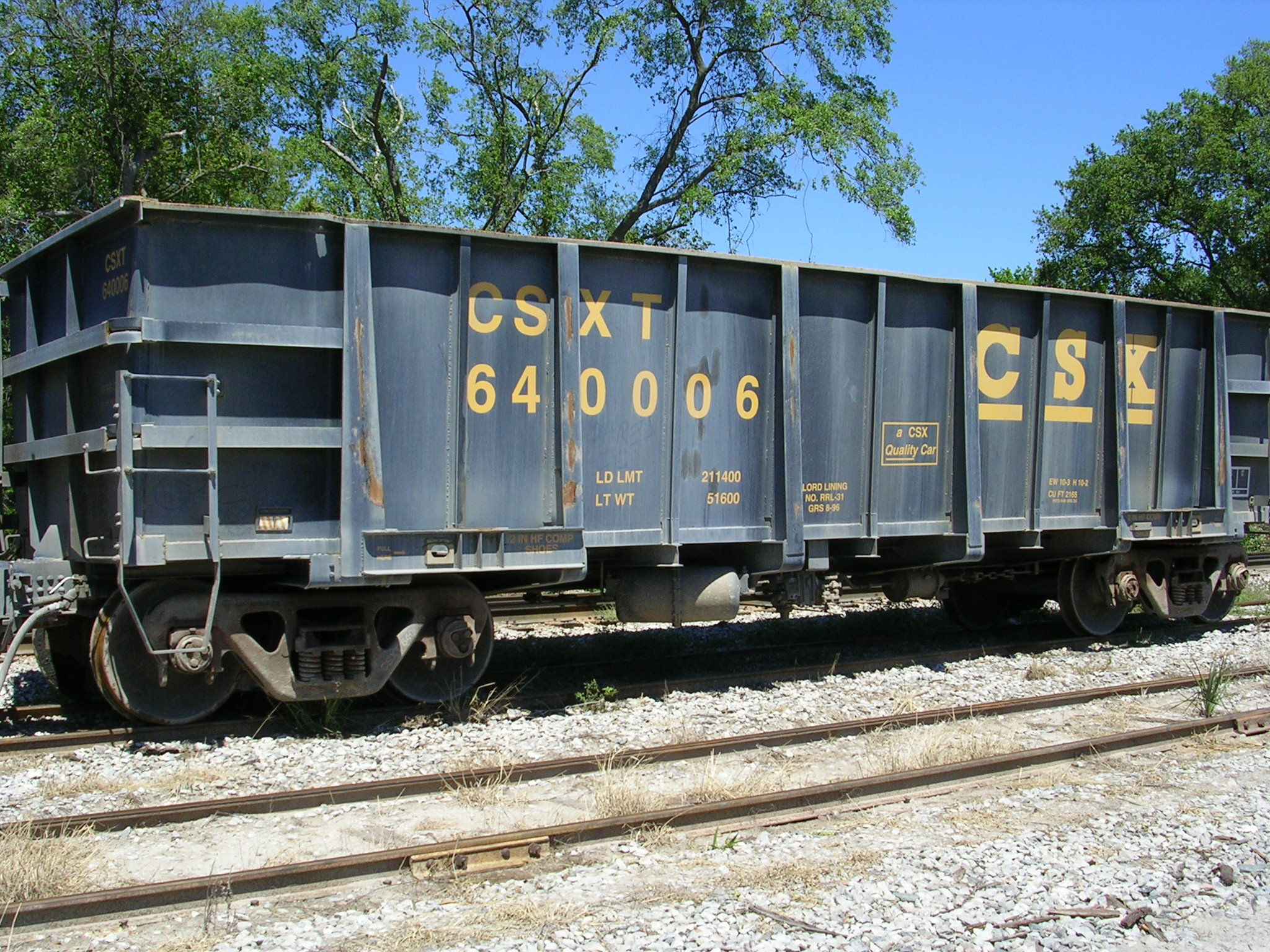
Rotary gondola on the Brewster Subdivision near Edison Junction

The line once had a spur track to the former Payne Creek Mine east of Agrock Yard. Payne Creek Mine has since been redeveloped by Mosaic into the Streamsong Resort and golf course.

In 1967, the Seaboard Air Line and the Atlantic Coast Line merged to form the Seaboard Coast Line Railroad. In 1980, the Seaboard Coast Line's parent company merged with the Chessie System, creating the CSX Corporation. The CSX Corporation initially operated the Chessie and Seaboard Systems separately until 1986, when they were merged into CSX Transportation.

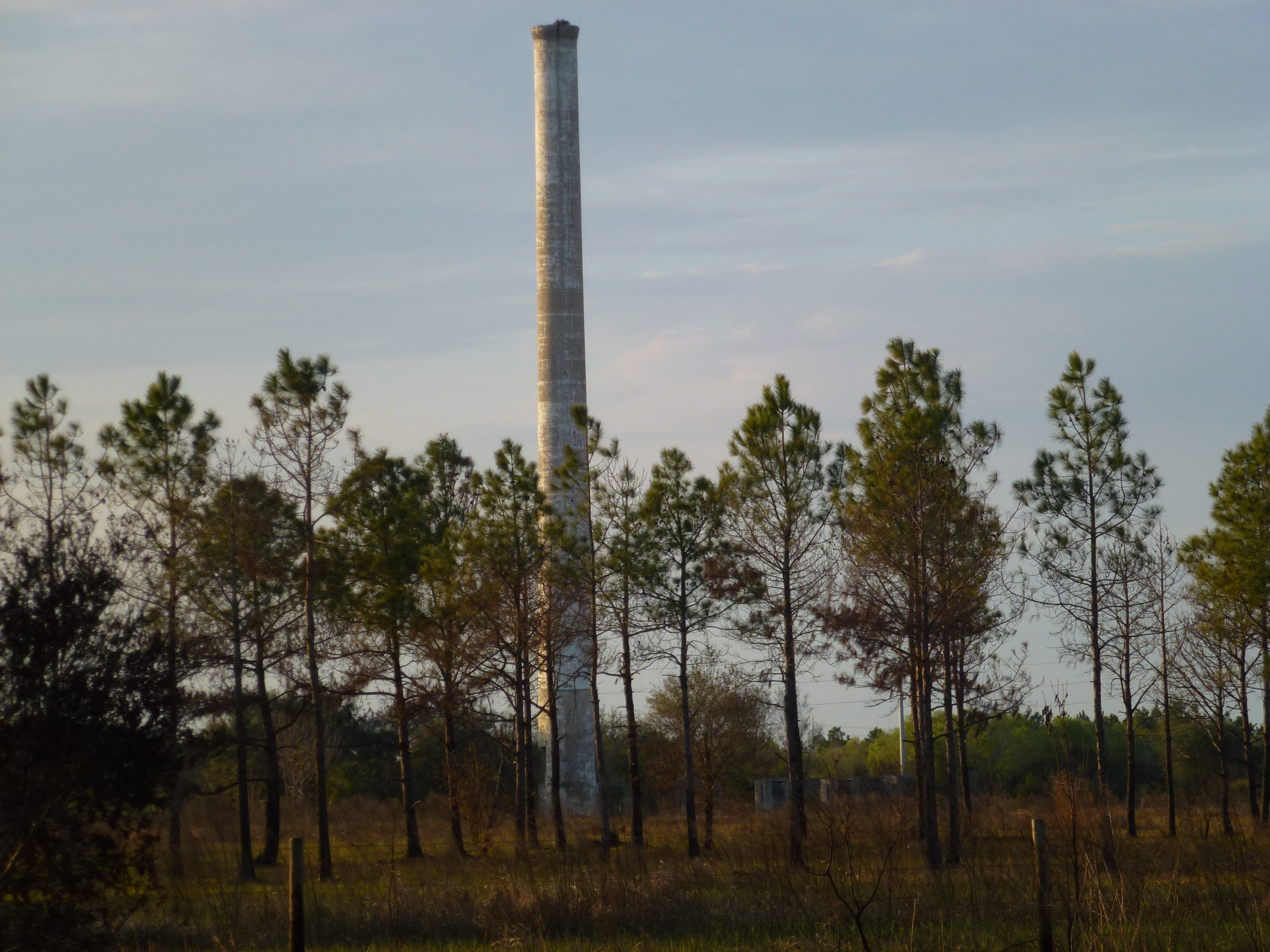
Abandoned smokestack in the defunct town of Brewster, the line's namesake

Track south of Arcadia to Boca Grande was abandoned in 1981 after the closure of Port Boca Grande. The remaining line was subsequently renamed the Brewster Subdivision, which is named for the defunct ghost town of Brewster that was located just south of Bradley Junction. The town existed from 1910 to 1962 and played a role in the area's phosphate industry. Remnants of the town include a smokestack and a few abandoned buildings.

== Historic Seaboard Air Line stations ==
Edison to South Boca Grande
Milepost	City/Location	Station	Connections and notes
SVC 835.8	Edison	Edison Junction	junction with Valrico Subdivision
SVC 843.3	Bradley Junction	Bradley Junction	junction with Achan Subdivision & Agricola Spur
SVC 846.5	Brewster	Brewster	originally Chicora
SVC 849.3		Cottmann	
SVC 851.2	Agrock yard	Agrock	originally Baird
SVC 855.6		Garwood	
SVC 856.2	Fort Green	Fort Green	
SVC 858.0	Fort Green Springs	Fort Green Springs	
SVC 865.5	Ona	Ona	
SVC 870.6		Bridges	
SVC 873.6		Limestone	
SVC 875.3		Kinsey	
SVC 881.0		Bunker-Lansing	
SVC 884.5	Arcadia	Arcadia	connection to Atlantic Coast Line Railroad Lakeland–Fort Myers Line junction with East and West Coast Railway (SAL)
SVC 888.4	Nocatee	Nocatee	
SVC 891.6		Wells Junction	
SVC 893.4	Hull	Hull	junction with Fort Myers Subdivision
SVC (VK) 895.3 (Note: The Seaboard Air Line assigned milepost prefix VK to the line south of Hull and VC from there to Bradley Junction (which continued down the line to Fort Myers). After the Fort Myers Subdivision was abandoned in 1952, the VK prefix was retired with VC (and later SVC after becoming the Seaboard Coast Line) replacing it to match the rest of the line.)		Carr	
SVC (VK) 898.8		Platt	junction with Tampa Southern Railroad (ACL)
SVC (VK) 908.7	Port Charlotte	Murdock	
SVC (VK) 909.1	Port Charlotte	Port Charlotte	
SVC (VK) 914.5	El Jobean	El Jobean	originally Southland
SVC (VK) 916.5		Charlotte Beach	originally McCall
SVC (VK) 923.6	Placida	Placida	
SVC (VK) 926.3	Gasparilla Island	Gasparilla	
SVC (VK) 930.1	Gasparilla Island	Boca Grande	
SVC (VK) 932.3	Gasparilla Island	South Boca Grande	served Port Boca Grande
