= Seaboard–All Florida Railway =

Railway system in Florida

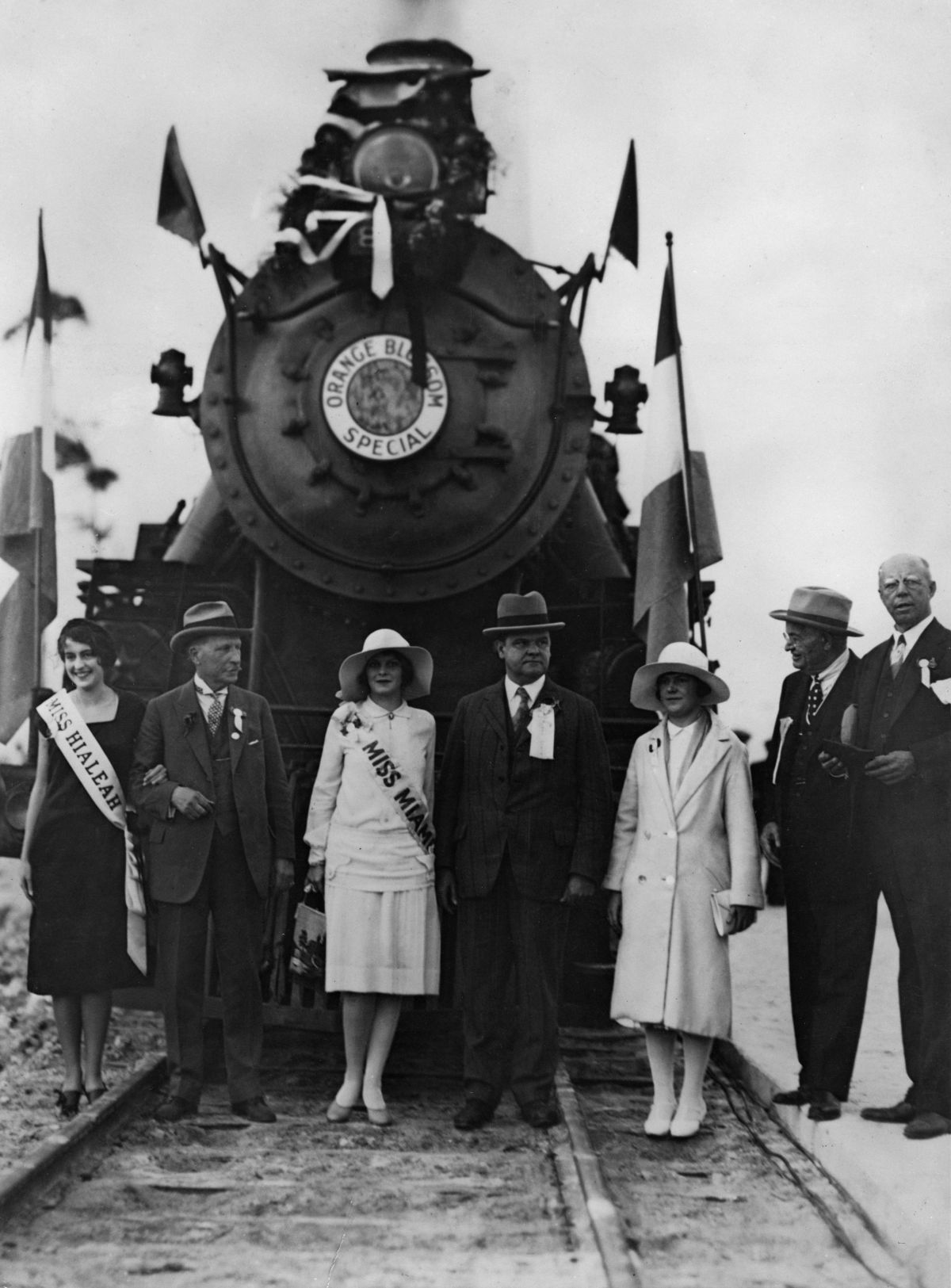
- Inaugural Orange Blossom Special in Miami on January 8, 1927

Overview
- Locale: East and West Coasts of Florida
- Successor: Seaboard Air Line Railroad

Technical
- Track gauge: 4 ft 8 1/2 in (1,435 mm) standard gauge

The Seaboard–All Florida Railway was a subsidiary of the Seaboard Air Line Railroad that was created in June 1925. It oversaw two major extensions of the system to southern Florida on each coast in response to the Florida land boom of the 1920s. The company gave the construction contract for the extension to Foley Brothers of St. Paul, Minnesota, who was one of the largest railroad contractors in the country at the time. Both extensions were heavily championed by Seaboard Air Line president S. Davies Warfield (who died months after its completion), and were constructed by Foley Brothers railroad contractors. Both extensions also allowed the Seaboard to better compete with the Florida East Coast Railway and the Atlantic Coast Line Railroad, who already served the lower east and west coasts of Florida respectively.

== East coast ==
On the east coast, the Seaboard–All Florida Railway oversaw the extension of the Seaboard Air Line's line at West Palm Beach south to Fort Lauderdale and Miami. Seaboard's line to West Palm Beach, which originated at their main line in Coleman (just south of Wildwood), was built a year prior by another Seaboard Air Line subsidiary, the Florida Western and Northern Railroad. Upon completion of the extension, the Seaboard–All Florida Railway from West Palm Beach to Miami (along with track north of West Palm Beach to Coleman) was designated as the Seaboard Air Line Railroad's Miami Subdivision.

The east coast route is still in service today and is now the state-owned South Florida Rail Corridor (which notably hosts Tri-Rail and Amtrak service for South Florida).

== West coast ==
On the west coast, the Seaboard–All Florida Railway oversaw construction of a line from Hull (near Fort Ogden) south to Fort Myers to the Estero River in Estero, with branches from Fort Myers to LaBelle and Punta Rassa. Another Seaboard Air Line subsidiary, the Naples, Seaboard and Gulf Railway, oversaw the construction of the line from the Estero River to Naples.

Unlike the east coast route, the west coast route was not as successful and would exist for less than thirty years. It was gradually abandoned from 1942 to 1952.

== Grand opening celebration ==
The route west coast route commenced operation on January 7, 1927, and the east coast route began service the following day. On each opening day, President S. Davies Warfield rode aboard a special section of the Seaboard's Orange Blossom Special with a number of special guests and dignitaries including Florida Governor John W. Martin. Dorothy Walker Bush, mother of U.S. President George H. W. Bush was also aboard the first train to Miami. The train stopped at points along the lines for public ovation with nearly 20,000 people attending. The two-day celebration is considered to be one of the largest public relations events in the history of American railroads.
