= Christina Lake =

Christina Lake or Lake Christina can refer to:

== Lakes ==
- Christina Lake (British Columbia), in British Columbia, Canada
- Christina Lake (Alberta), in Alberta, Canada
- Christina Lake (Florida), west of Lakeland Highlands, Florida
- Christina Lake (Minnesota), in Douglas and Grant counties, Minnesota

== Settlements ==
- Christina Lake, British Columbia, an unincorporated recreational area West Kootenay region of British Columbia, Canada

== See also ==
- Christina Lake, character from the Australian soap opera Neighbours
- Christina (disambiguation)
