= Winston and Bone Valley Railroad =

Historic railroad line in Florida

- Original route (click to enlarge)

Overview
- Locale: Central Florida
- Dates of operation: 1892–1900
- Successor: Plant System; Atlantic Coast Line Railroad; Seaboard Coast Line Railroad

Technical
- Track gauge: 4 ft 8 1/2 in (1,435 mm) standard gauge

The Winston and Bone Valley Railroad was a railroad line running in the Bone Valley region of Central Florida. It connected to the South Florida Railroad main line (the current CSX A Line) near Lakeland. A vast majority of the line remains in service by CSX Transportation, which operates it today as the Bone Valley Subdivision.

== History ==
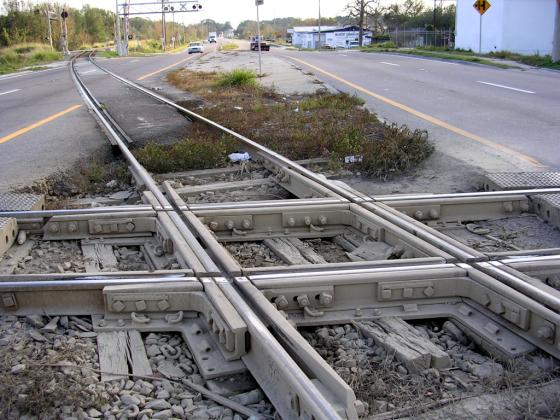
Crossing of the Valrico and Bone Valley Subdivisions in Mulberry. Diamond is located in the median of State Road 37.

The Winston and Bone Valley Railroad began operations in 1892. It was founded by J.E. Griffin and William Mills Winn, who had operated a lumber mill just four miles northwest of Lakeland since 1884. They relocated the mill to a location four miles west of Lakeland in 1892. The location of this lumber mill became known as Winnston (named for Winn), which would later be shortened to Winston. Griffin and Winn built the Winston and Bone Valley Railroad to serve the lumber mill.

There was also heavy demand for rail service in the area's flourishing phosphate industry, and the 16-mile line also ended up serving many of the area's phosphate mines. The line was later leased to the Plant System in 1900, which also operated the nearby South Florida Railroad and Florida Southern Railway. The line was then extended to connect with the Florida Southern in Fort Meade. The lease was inherited by the Atlantic Coast Line Railroad (ACL) in 1902 when they took over the Plant System. The ACL then bought out the line completely in 1909, designating it as their Bone Valley Branch.

In 1967, the Atlantic Coast Line merged with their rival, the Seaboard Air Line Railroad (which also operated tracks nearby). The merged company became the Seaboard Coast Line Railroad. The track from Agricola east to Fort Meade was abandoned by 1982.

In 1980, the Seaboard Coast Line's parent company merged with the Chessie System, creating the CSX Corporation. The CSX Corporation initially operated the Chessie and Seaboard Systems separately until 1986, when they were merged into CSX Transportation.

== Current Operations ==
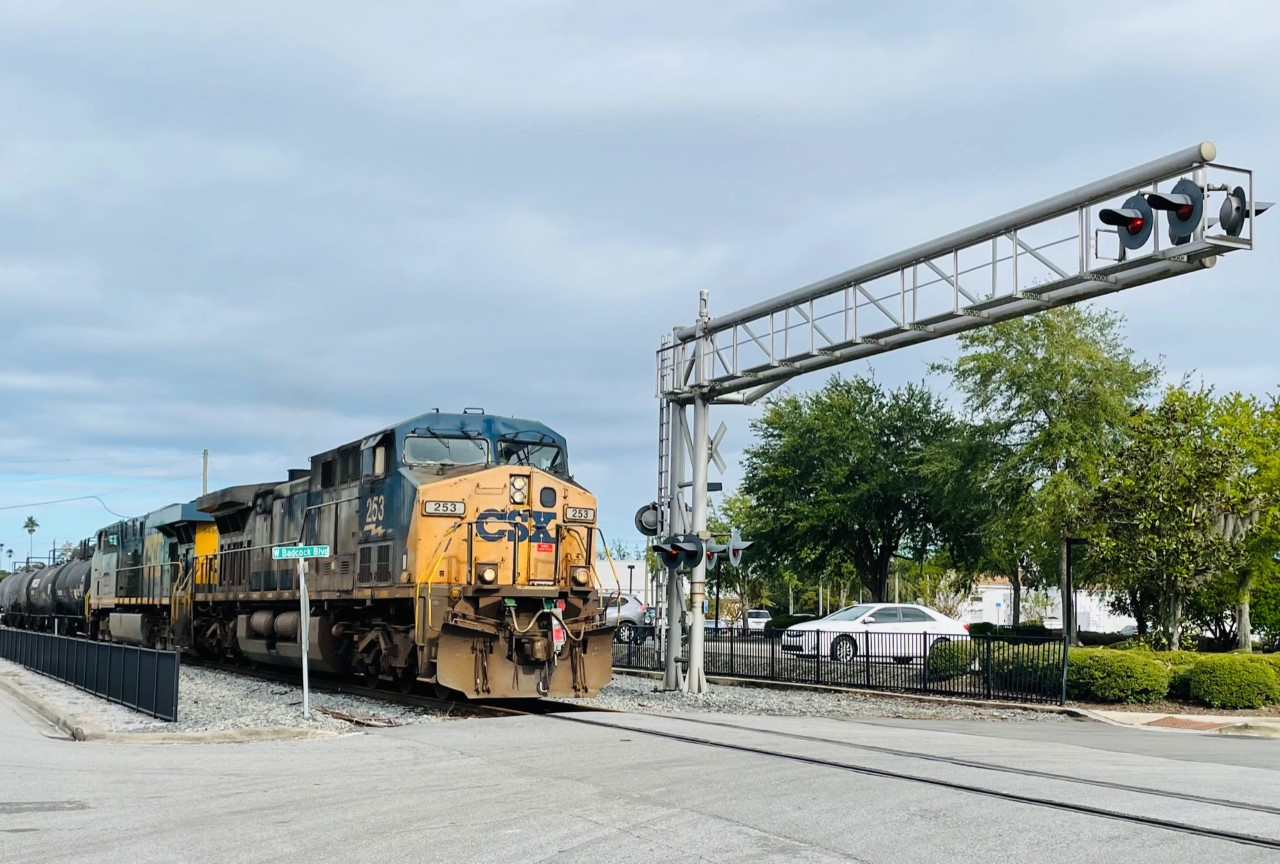
CSX train O731 passing through Mulberry on the Bone Valley Subdivision

What remains of the line continues to be operated today by CSX Transportation and is designated as their Bone Valley Subdivision. It connects to CSX's A Line and Winston Yard at the north end. At the south end, the track currently ends in Agricola at a wye with CSX's Agricola Spur (a former Seaboard Air Line track).

The Bone Valley Subdivision crosses the Valrico Subdivision in Mulberry in the median of State Road 37. The line connects to the Valrico Subdivision (which is CSX's busiest route through the Bone Valley) through Mulberry Yard at Prairie Junction. The Bone Valley Subdivision also intersects with the Achan Subdivision in Achan.

The Bone Valley Subdivision still serves a number of phosphate mines along its route between Achan and Agricola. Phosphate is generally brought from the mines to Winston Yard to be exported by rail throughout the country. Phosphate is also sent to Tampa to be exported by ship at Rockport Yard.

Currently, Winston Yard at the north end of the line is CSX's primary classification yard for much of Central Florida. In addition to phosphate, the yard is used to stage manifest freight for much of the area. Winston Yard was expanded in the 1980s to fill the void when CSX closed their Lakeland Yard, which was located at the northwest corner of Lakeland Junction (located about four miles east of Winston).

== Historic Atlantic Coast Line stations ==
Milepost	City/Location	Station	Connections and notes
AY 855.4	Winston	Winston	junction with South Florida Railroad (ACL)
AY 861.8	Medulla	Medulla	
AY 862.0	Lakeland Highlands	Tancrede	junction with Ridgewood Spur
AYC 868.3		Ridgewood	located on Ridgewood Spur
AY 863.5		Christina	
AY 865.0	Mulberry	Prairie Junction	To CSX Mulberry Yard and Martin Marietta Mulberry Rail Terminal
AY 865.9	Mulberry	Mulberry	junction with Seaboard Air Line Railroad Valrico Subdivision
AY 866.3		Memminger	
AY 867.3		Kingsford	junction with spur to Nichols
AY 868.1	Achan	Achan	previously known as Bruce junction with: Pierce Spur (Note: Pierce Spur was right beside the Charlotte Harbor and Northern Railway (the present-day Achan Subdivision). It has since been combined with it.); Charlotte Harbor and Northern Railway (SAL)
AYD 870.2		Pierce	located on Pierce Spur
AY 869.7		Pebbledale	junction with Bonnie Spur
AYH 871.9		Bonnie Mine	located on Bonnie Spur
AY 870.3		Long Branch	
AY 873.2		Green Bay	junction with Noralyn Spur
AYJ 875.1		Noralyn	located on Noralyn Spur
AY 875.9		Phosphoria	
AY 877.1	Agricola	Agricola	
AY 881.0		Tiger Bay	
AY 883.3	Fort Meade	Fort Meade	junction with Florida Southern Railway (ACL)
