= Hull, Florida =

Unincorporated community in Florida, US

Hull is an unincorporated community in DeSoto County, Florida, United States, located 8.5 miles (13.7 km) southwest of the city of Arcadia.

== Geography ==
Hull is located at 27°07′09″N 81°56′32″W, with an elevation of 39 feet (12 m).

== Churches ==
Mt. Olive CME founded 1912 St. Mary Missionary Baptist Church

== History ==
Hull came to prominence in the late 1800s at the height of phosphate mining operations in the lower Peace River. It was the location of the phosphate drying plant operated by the Charlotte Harbor Phosphate Company. It was named for Joseph Hull, whose company Hammond & Hull (later known as Comer & Hull) owned the Charlotte Harbor Phosphate Company. The company also built a railroad spur connecting the plant to the Florida Southern Railway just to the southeast to supplement its operation. Another company, the Peace River Phosphate Company, also operated a railroad through Hull on its route from Arcadia to the phosphate town of Liverpool. Hull later invested in the Peace River Phosphate Company and soon merged it with the Charlotte Harbor Phosphate Company and two other phosphate companies into the Peace River Phosphate Mining Company. By 1902, the Peace River Phosphate Mining Company was absorbed by the American Agricultral Chemical Company.

By 1907, what had been the Peace River Phosphate Company's railroad connecting Arcadia with Liverpool via Hull was expanded to Boca Grande and became part of the Charlotte Harbor and Northern Railway. Phosphate deposits near Hull were depleted soon after and operations there were discontinued. The phosphate industry then moved further north into the Bone Valley. In 1913, the Charlotte Harbor and Northern Railway began using the site of the phosphate plant in Hull to preserve railroad ties and timbers in creosote which were used to maintain the railroad and its infrastructure. The railroad's creosote operations continued until 1952.

The American Agricultral Chemical Company sold the Charlotte Harbor and Northern Railway to the Seaboard Air Line Railroad in 1926. Immediately after, the Seaboard began building a branch line from Hull south to Fort Myers and Naples. Hull would be the junction between the Seaboard's lines to Boca Grande and Fort Myers until 1952, when the company abandoned its Fort Myers Subdivision. The railroad's Boca Grande Subdivision remained until its abandonment in 1981.

Today, Hull is a tiny residential Hamlet just northeast of Fort Odgen. The former phosphate and creosote site is still owned by CSX Transportation (the Seaboard Air Line's successor). The site is fenced off due to creosote contamination.
