= Bradley Junction, Florida =

- Census-designated place
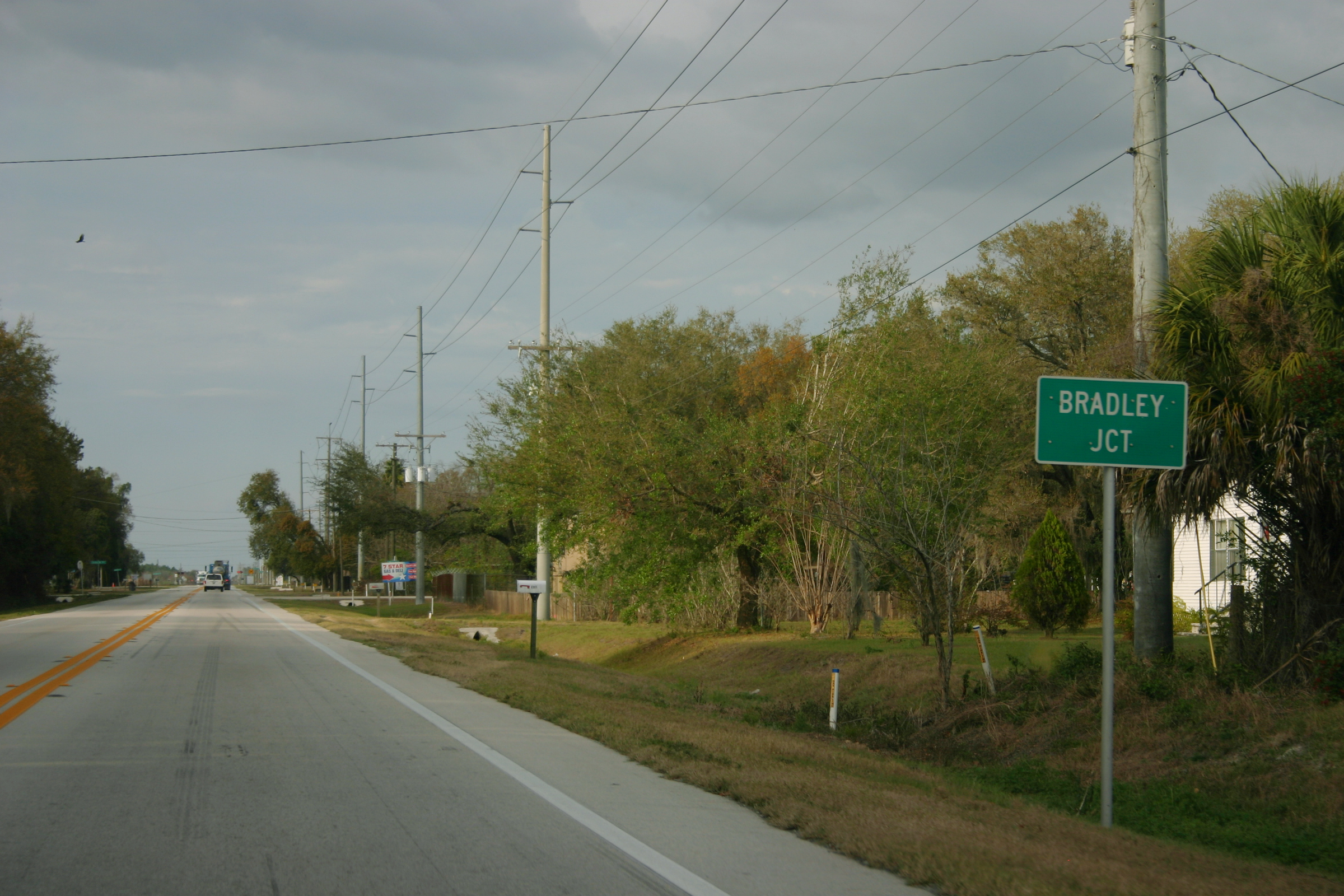
- Northbound Florida State Road 37 as it enters Bradley Junction

- Location within Florida Location within the United States
- Coordinates: 27°47′39″N 81°58′42″W
- Country: United States
- State: Florida
- County: Polk

Area
  - Total: 2.15 sq mi (5.57 km^{2})
  - Land: 2.11 sq mi (5.46 km^{2})
  - Water: 0.042 sq mi (0.11 km^{2})
- Elevation: 135 ft (41 m)

Population (2020)
  - Total: 542
  - Density: 257.1/sq mi (99.25/km^{2})
- Time zone: UTC-5 (Eastern (EST))
  - Summer (DST): UTC-4 (EDT)
- ZIP codes: 33835
- Area code: 863
- GNIS feature ID: 2583331

Bradley Junction (also known as Bradley) is an unincorporated community and census-designated place in southwestern Polk County, Florida, United States. Its population was 542 as of the 2020 census.

== History ==
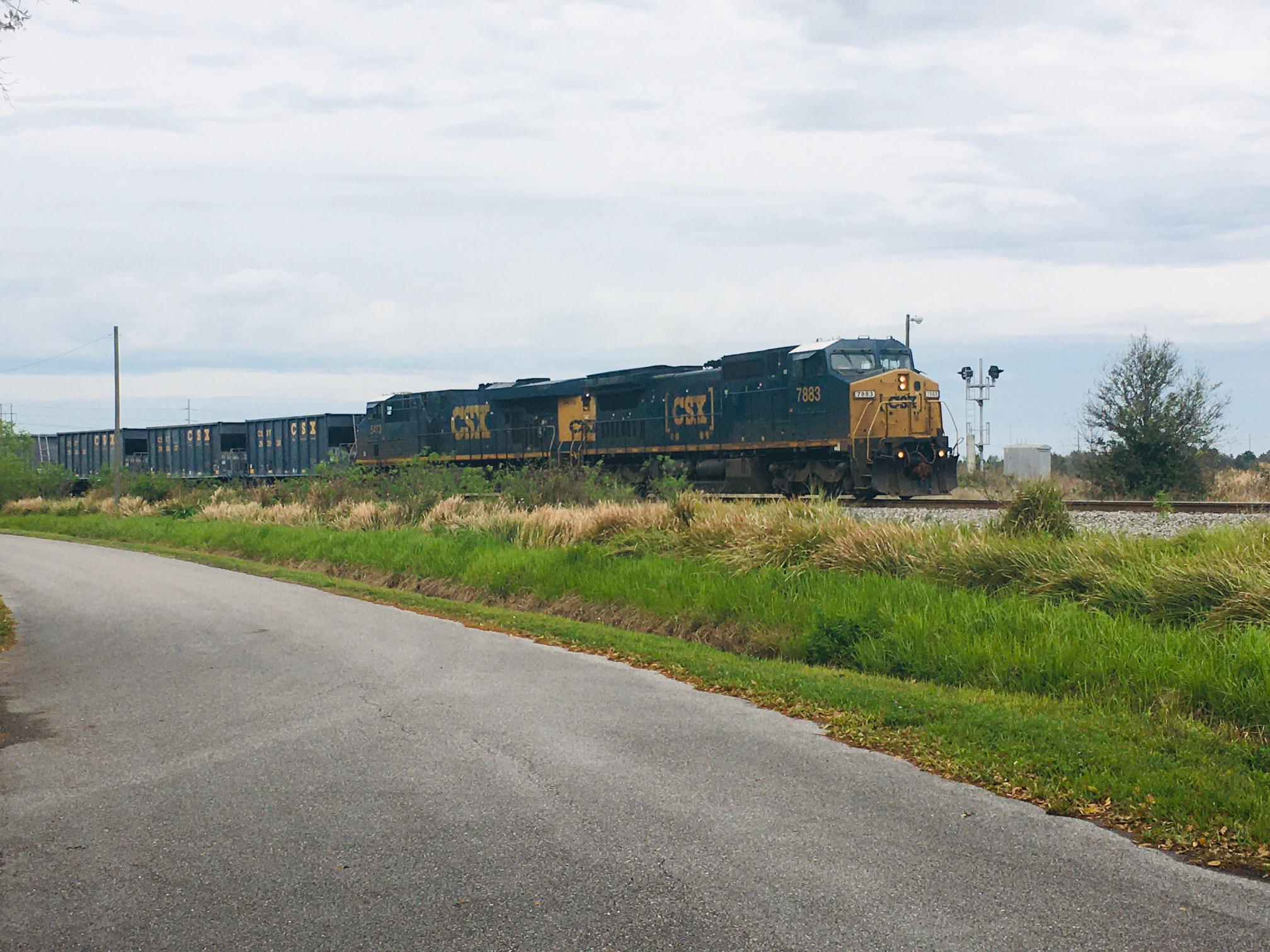
A CSX train on the Brewster Subdivision at the namesake for Bradley Junction.

Bradley Junction is named for the railroad junction located in the community, which was historically the junction between the Seaboard Air Line Railroad (the east-west track) and the Charlotte Harbor and Northern Railway (the north-south track). The junction itself is named after phosphate mining company executive Peter B. Bradley, who chartered the Charlotte Harbor and Northern Railway in 1905. The railroad junction still exists today and both lines are now owned by CSX Transportation. In the mid 1990s, the Florida Gulf Coast Railroad Museum (now the Florida Railroad Museum) moved the railroad station from Bradley Junction to Parrish. The depot was then consumed by a fire soon after the move.

== Geography ==
Bradley Junction's elevation is 135 feet above sea level.

== Demographics ==
Historical population
Census	Pop.	Note	%±
2010	686		—
2020	542		−21.0%
U.S. Decennial Census

Bradley Junction first appeared as a census designated place in the 2010 U.S. census.

=== Racial and ethnic composition ===
Bradley Junction CDP, Florida – Racial and ethnic composition Note: the US Census treats Hispanic/Latino as an ethnic category. This table excludes Latinos from the racial categories and assigns them to a separate category. Hispanics/Latinos may be of any race.
Race / Ethnicity (NH = Non-Hispanic)	Pop 2010	Pop 2020	% 2010	% 2020
White alone (NH)	396	261	57.73%	48.15%
Black or African American alone (NH)	227	157	33.09%	28.97%
Native American or Alaska Native alone (NH)	5	8	0.73%	1.48%
Asian alone (NH)	3	6	0.44%	1.11%
Native Hawaiian or Pacific Islander alone (NH)	0	0	0.00%	0.00%
Other race alone (NH)	0	1	0.00%	0.18%
Mixed race or Multiracial (NH)	8	20	1.17%	3.69%
Hispanic or Latino (any race)	47	89	6.85%	16.42%
Total	686	542	100.00%	100.00%

== Education ==
The community of Bradley Junction is served by Polk County Public Schools.
