= Brewster, Florida =

- Ghost town
- Brewster Power Plant in 1920

- Location within Florida Location within the United States
- Coordinates: 27°45′9″N 81°58′47″W
- Country: United States
- State: Florida
- County: Polk
- Elevation: 143 ft (44 m)

Population (2010)
  - Total: 3
- Time zone: UTC-5 (Eastern (EST))
  - Summer (DST): UTC-4 (EDT)

Brewster is a ghost town in southwest Polk County, Florida, United States, ten miles south of Mulberry. It is at an elevation of 143 ft (44 m) above sea level and has been uninhabited since the early 1960s. The population is 3, according to the 2010 Census.

The village of Brewster was founded in 1910 and for decades flourished from phosphate mining. It was largely a company town for American Cyanamid. The town had its own schools, movie theater, medical clinic, and a post office, which was established in 1913 and discontinued in 1961. It also was the site of a rail switch yard, Agrock rail yard.

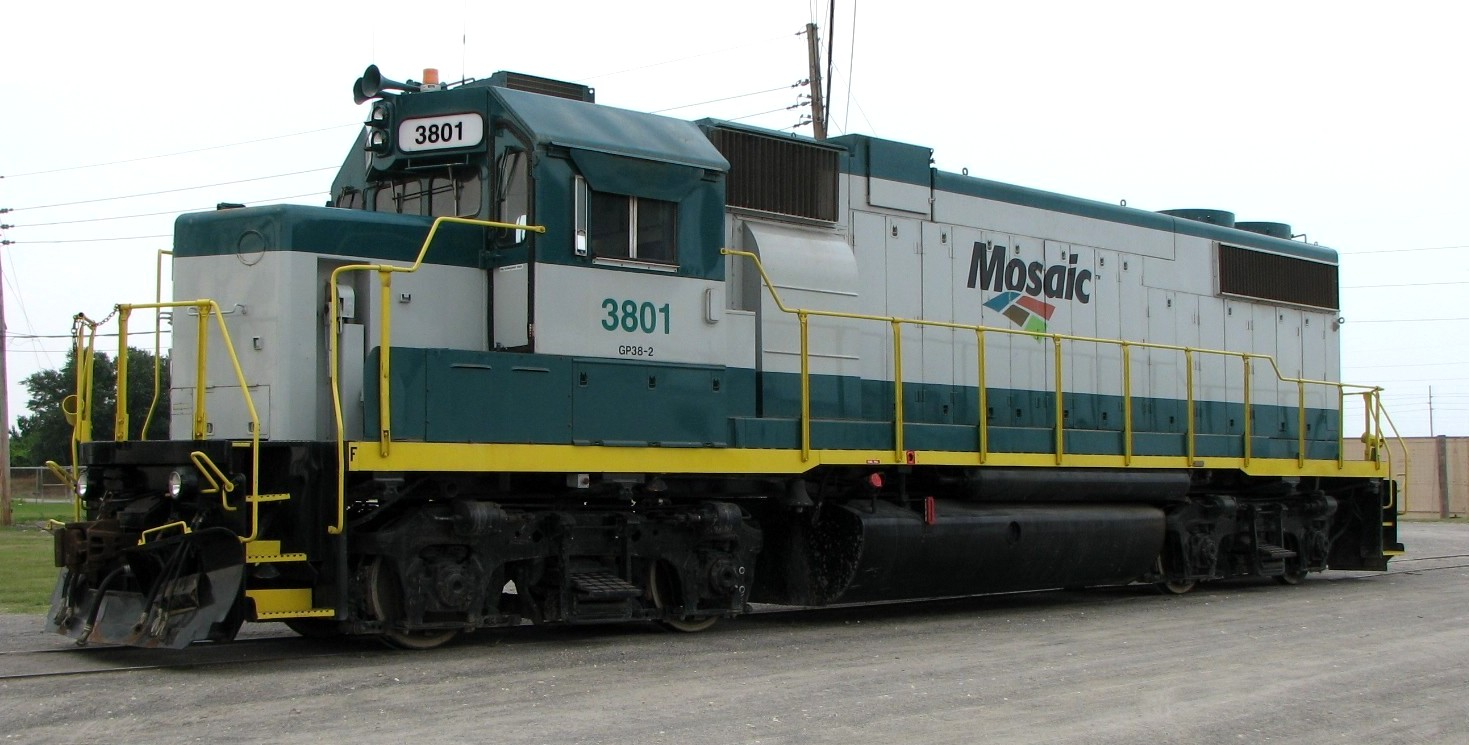
An EMD GP38-2 diesel locomotive sits astride the tracks at the Agrock Rail switch yard.

The inventor of the digital computer, John Vincent Atanasoff, though born in Hamilton, New York, grew up in Brewster.

The village was officially closed down by the company in 1962. Much of Brewster was demolished at the time, but some abandoned buildings remain, including a smokestack which rises prominently in the area as a landmark. The deed to Brewster was turned over to the state of Florida in partial payment of a judgment against American Cyanamid for environmental damages.

== Demographics ==
Brewster was listed as a census designated place in the 2010 U.S. census with a population of 3. The CDP was deleted prior to the 2020 U.S. census.

== Gallery ==
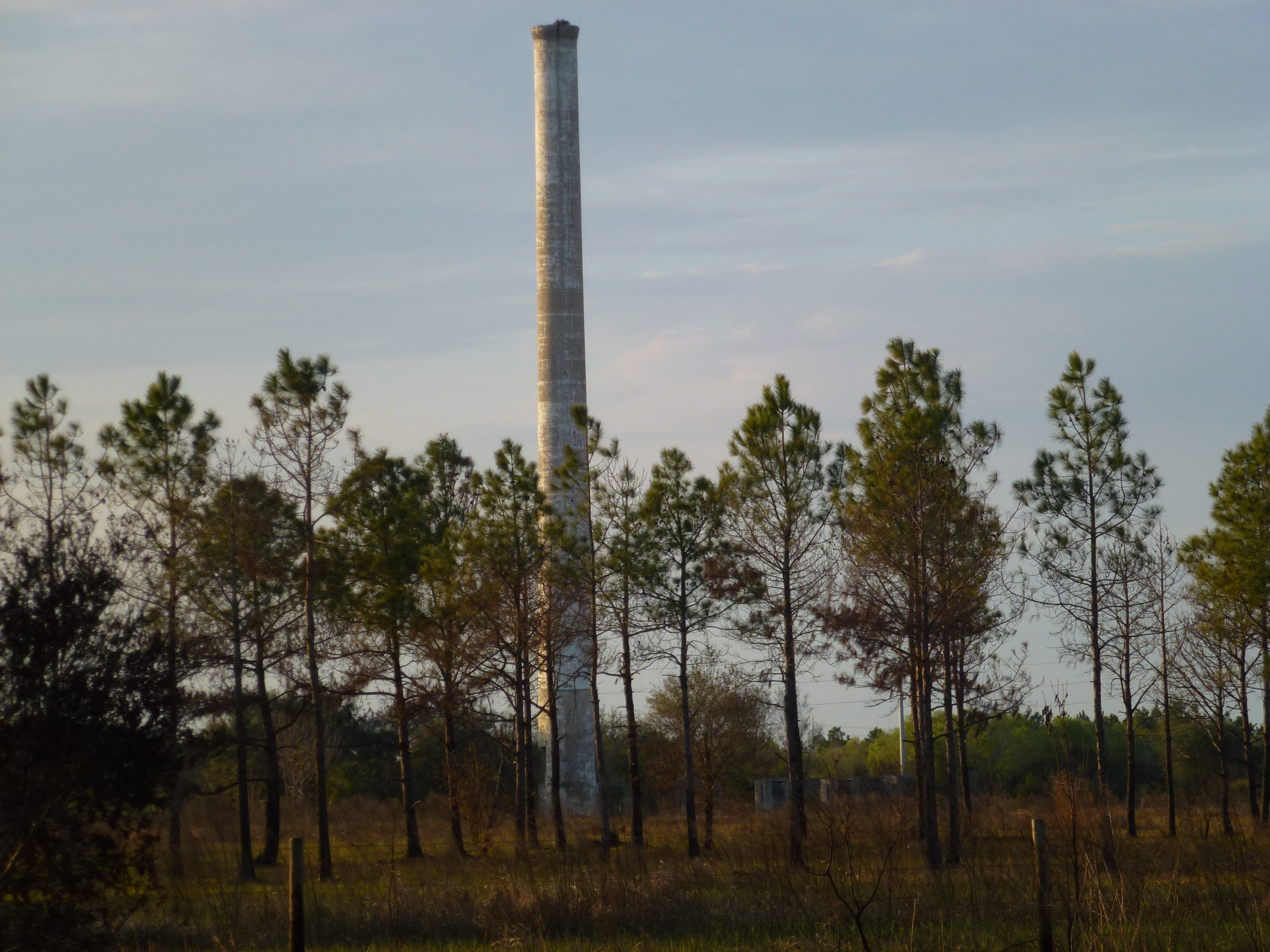
Brewster Florida Smokestack in 2012 from Old Highway 37

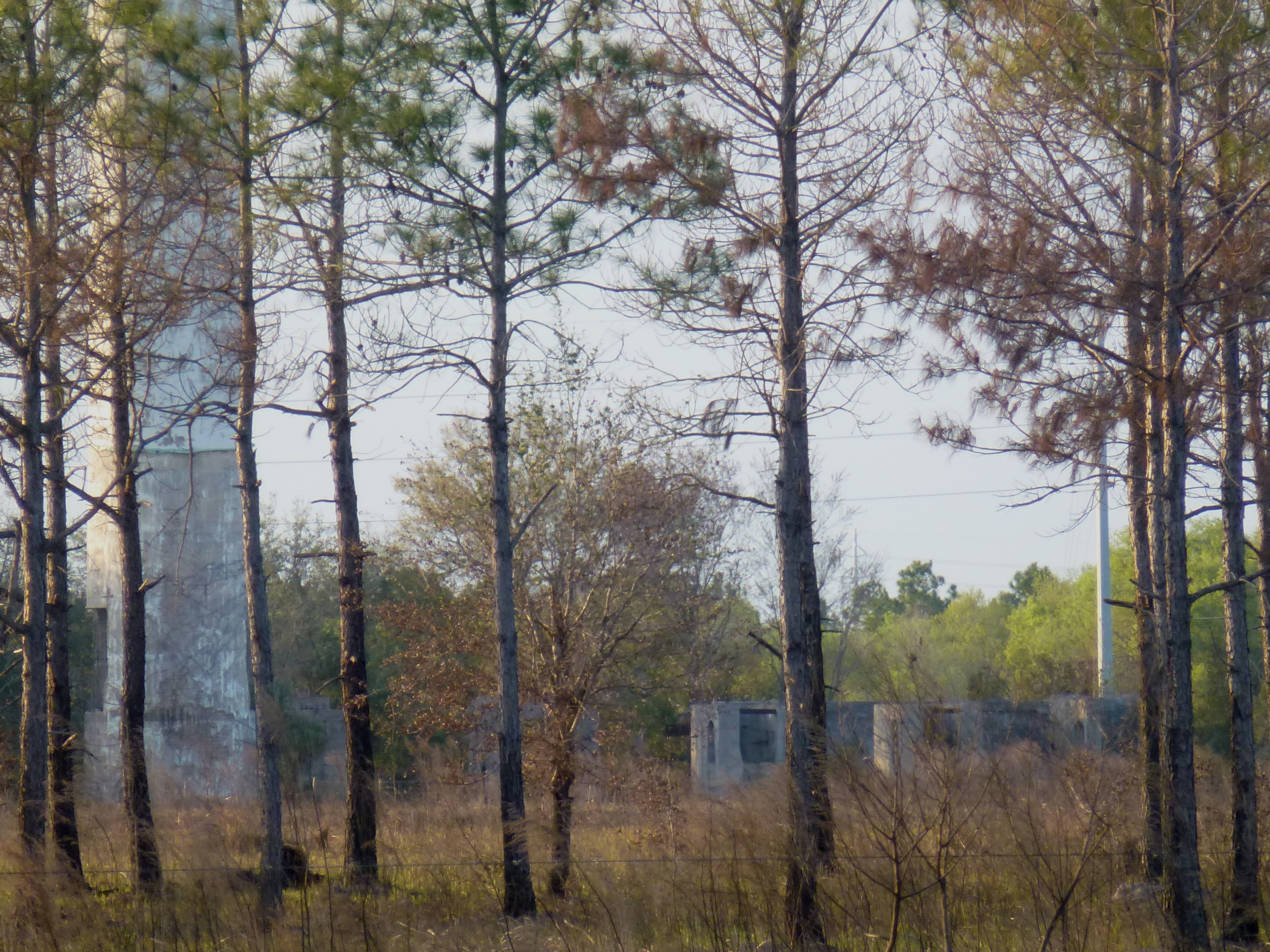
Brewster Florida Abandoned Buildings in 2012 from Old Highway 37

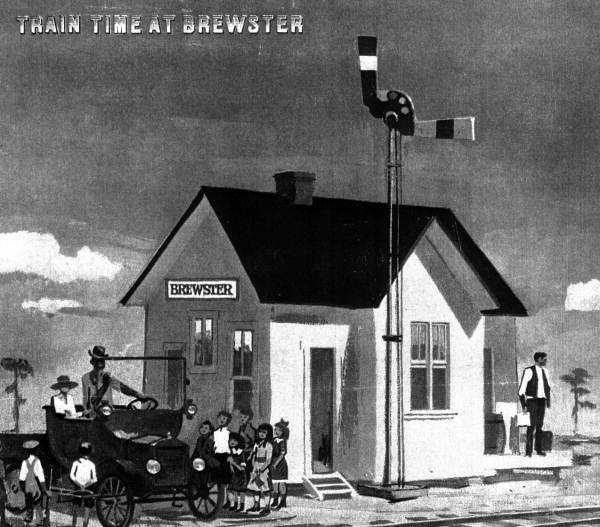
Artist rendering of the former Brewster railroad depot

== See also ==
- Agrock yard, a nearby railroad yard
