= Agricola, Florida =

Company town in Florida, United States

Coordinates: 27.787814°N 81.891457°W

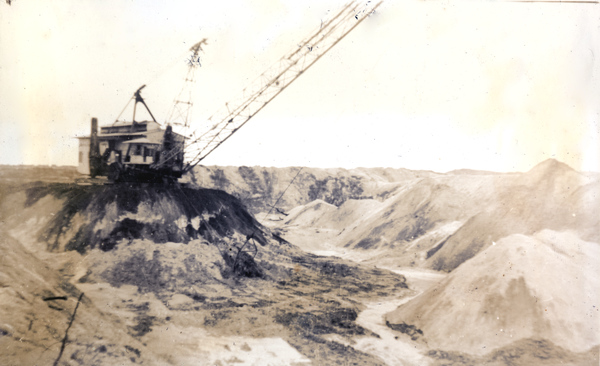
Dragline operating at Swift & Co. phosphate mine in Agricola, unknown date

Agricola is a former company town in Polk County, Florida, United States, that was built in 1907, 15 kilometres (9.3 mi) south-west of Bartow. It is at a mean elevation of 167 feet. The town was built to house employees of food processing business Swift and Company. The town operated a food processing plant and a phosphate mining operation until the 1950s. Residents were exclusively factory workers and their families. The community was self contained and self reliable with shops, schools and houses for the workers and their families. The town lasted up until the 1950s, when the expansion of the phosphate industry ended the need for providing housing for employees. The town residents were offered a decision to purchase and move their homes. Whatever was not moved was destroyed. After the town was destroyed, the area operated as a phosphate mine.
