= Christina Lake (Florida) =

- Location within Florida Location within the United States
- Location: Lakeland Highlands, Florida
- Coordinates: 27.9511°N 81.9673°W
- Type: manmade freshwater lake
- Basin countries: United States
- Max. length: 1,520 feet (460 m)
- Max. width: 960 feet (290 m)
- Surface area: 26.99 acres (11 ha)
- Surface elevation: 148 feet (45 m)

Christina Lake, also called Christina Pit, is a wedge-shaped lake. This lake is a manmade freshwater lake just west of Lakeland Highlands, Florida. It is a mine excavation that was landscaped to become a lake. This lake has a 26.99-acre (109,200 m^{2}) surface area. It is bounded on the east by a narrow strip of land that separates it from another converted mine pit, now called Six Pound Pond. On the north is County Road 540A, on the northeast is a business property, on the west is S. Florida Avenue (State Route 37) and on the south are residences on the north side of Christina Lake Drive.

There are no public boat ramps or no swimming areas on Christina Lake's shores. However, there is public access to the lake along the north and west side public road right-of-way areas, as well as along the strip of land on the east separating the lake from Six Pound Pond. The Hook and Bullet website says Christina Lake contains brook trout and lake trout.

In March 2005 a man was found dead in Six Pound Pond. He was killed by a 9 foot 8 inch 300-pound alligator that was subsequently captured and killed.
