= Lansing, Florida =

Unincorporated community in Florida, U.S.

Lansing is an unincorporated community in DeSoto County, Florida, United States. It is located approximately 2 miles (3.2 km) northwest of Arcadia.

== Geography ==
Lansing is located at 27°15′24″N 81°53′20″W, its elevation 52 feet (16 m).
