= Fort Ogden, Florida =

Unincorporated community in Florida, U.S.

Coordinates: 27°05′14″N 81°57′08″W

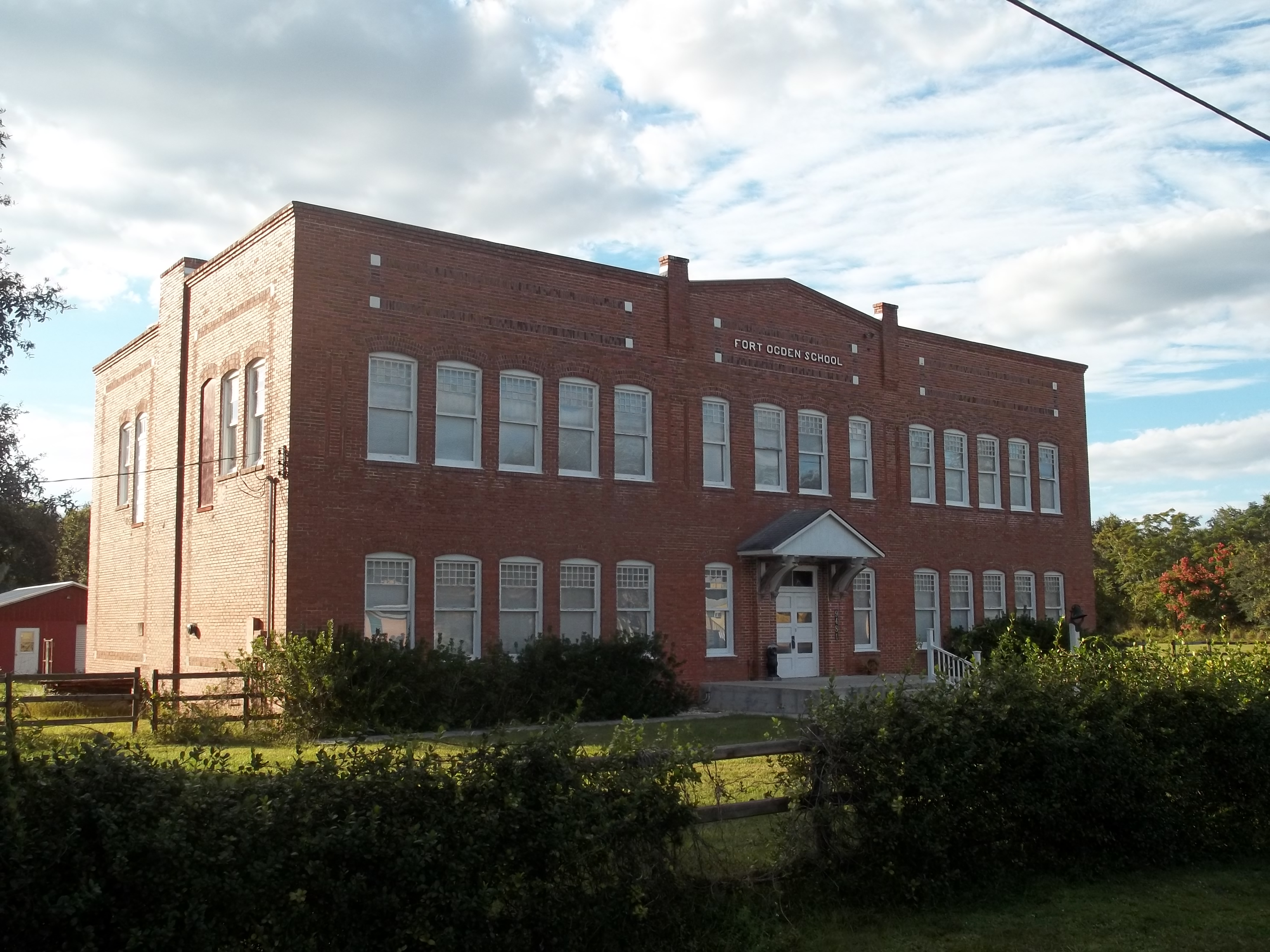
Old school in Fort Ogden

Fort Ogden is an unincorporated community in DeSoto County, Florida, United States. It is located approximately 10 miles (16 km) southwest of the city of Arcadia. U.S. Route 17 and the Fort Myers Division of the Seminole Gulf Railway pass through the community, and break away from each other.

The community's name is taken from a U.S. Army post established in 1841 during the Second Seminole War located within the community.
