= Florida State Road 865 =

State highway in Florida, United States

State Road 865 and County Road 865
- CR 865 in pink, SR 865 in red

Route information
- Maintained by FDOT and Lee County DOT
- Length: 41.697 mi (67.105 km) 5.797 miles (9.329 km) as SR 865; 35.9 miles (57.78 km) as CR 865

Major junctions
- South end: Logan Boulevard in Bonita Springs
- I-75 in Bonita Springs; US 41 in Bonita Springs; SR 82 in Fort Myers
- North end: SR 80 in Tice

Location
- Country: United States
- State: Florida
- County: Lee

Highway system
- Florida State Highway System; Interstate; US; State; Former; Pre‑1945; Toll; Scenic
| ← SR 863 | → SR 867 |

State Road 865 (SR 865) and County Road 865 (CR 865) are a series of roads serving Lee County, Florida, extending from Bonita Springs to Tice by way of Fort Myers Beach and Fort Myers. SR 865 currently consists of two segments connected by a part of CR 865, which also extends to the north and south of the state segments. Both the state and county controlled segments of the route combined stretch a distance of over 40 miles (64.37 km), making it the longest designation in Lee County.

State Road 865 previously existed along a much longer highway. The middle section of CR 865 and the southern segment of CR 865 west of Interstate 75 were previously part of SR 865. The northern segment of CR 865 in Fort Myers and Tice was previously part of State Road 80B (SR 80B). In the late 1970s, FDOT started a process in which these sections would be converted to county control. This was part of a series of transformations that particularly affected Southwest Florida.

== Route description ==
=== Bonita Springs and Fort Myers Beach ===
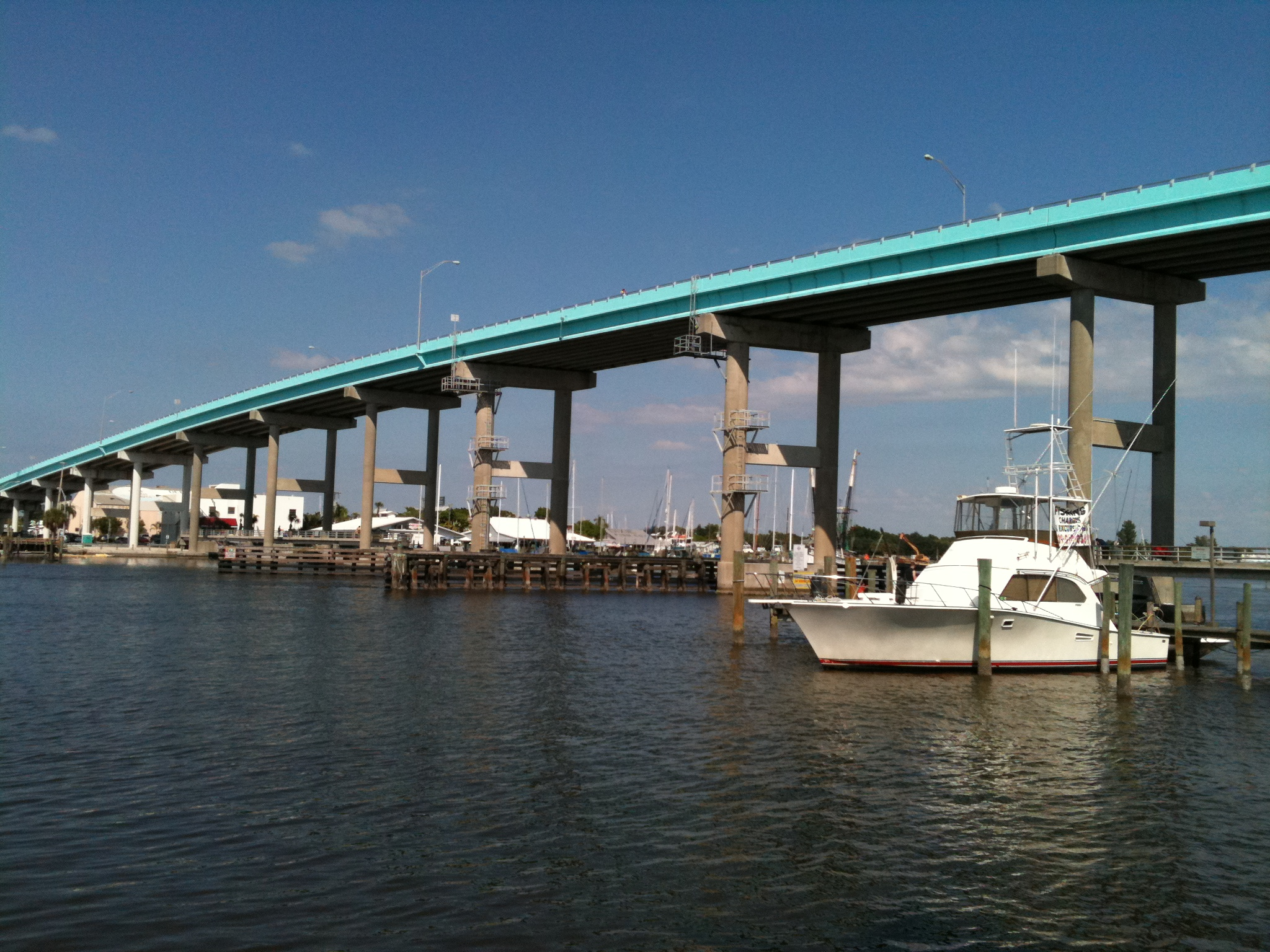
SR 865 connects to Estero Island via the Matanzas Pass Bridge

The historic southern terminus of SR 865 is an interchange between Interstate 75 (I-75 or SR 93) and Bonita Beach Road in Bonita Springs, though the current county designation actually begins 2.2 miles (3.54 km) east of the interchange near Logan Boulevard. From here, CR 865 follows Bonita Beach Road westward through Bonita Springs to Hickory Boulevard on Bonita Beach (Little Hickory Island). It then follows Hickory Boulevard north along the Gulf of Mexico shore.

At the north end of Bonita Beach, CR 865 crosses the Bonita Beach Causeway, which passes over Big Hickory Island, Long Key and Black Key, which provides access to the Lovers Key / Carl E. Johnson State Park. Once on Estero Island, CR 865 is known as Estero Boulevard and passes through the island town of Fort Myers Beach before connecting to San Carlos Boulevard on the north end of the island. State maintenance begins the intersection of Estero and San Carlos boulevards near central Fort Myers Beach. After crossing the Matanzas Pass Bridge and San Carlos Island onto the mainland, SR 865 forms the western boundary of Estero Bay Preserve State Park adjacent to Hurricane Bay.

=== Iona and South Fort Myers ===
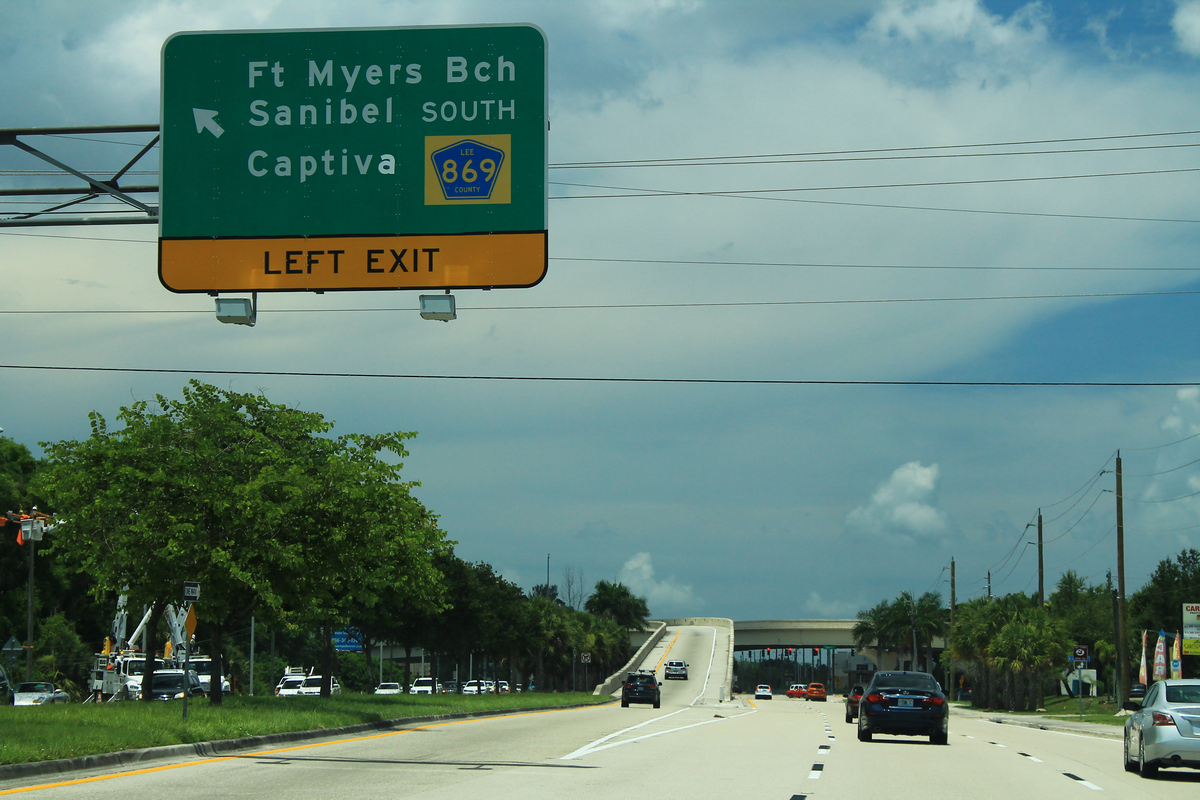
CR 865 (Gladiolus Drive) approaching its intersection with CR 869 (Summerlin Road), which includes left-turning flyover ramps.

San Carlos Boulevard then intersects with Summerlin Road (CR 869), which is a grade-separated single-point urban interchange, with Summerlin Road crossing above on an overpass. This interchange also provides access to Sanibel Island. The southern section of SR 865 continues northward its northern terminus, an intersection with McGregor Boulevard, which is SR 867 to the northeast of the intersection, and CR 867 to the southwest, a more direct route connecting downtown Fort Myers to the popular Sanibel and Captiva islands.

At this point, SR 865 ends and CR 865 resumes, proceeding east along Gladiolus Drive through Harlem Heights. East of here, CR 865 intersects Summerlin Road (CR 869) again, this time at an at-grade intersection with two left-turning flyover ramps. It passes by Lakes Park before intersecting with U.S. Route 41 (US 41), where the route transitions yet again to SR 865.

Extending only 1.1 miles (1.8 km) in South Fort Myers, the northern section of SR 865 is locally known as the Ben C. Pratt Six Mile Cypress Parkway. It begins at Tamiami Trail (US 41) and terminates at an intersection with Metro and Michael G. Rippe Parkways (SR 739). While this section runs in east–west route, it is still signed as a north–south route to be consistent with the adjacent county-controlled segments.

=== East Fort Myers and Tice ===
Beyond the northern section's terminus at SR 739, CR 865 continues along Six Mile Cypress Parkway and turns north passing the Lee County Sports Complex, which contains Hammond Stadium, the spring training home of the Minnesota Twins major league baseball team. As it turns north, it parallels the Six Mile Cypress Slough. At Colonial Boulevard (SR 884), CR 865 becomes Ortiz Avenue and parallels Interstate 75 to its northern terminus, an intersection with Palm Beach Boulevard (SR 80) in Tice.

== History ==
=== Early years ===
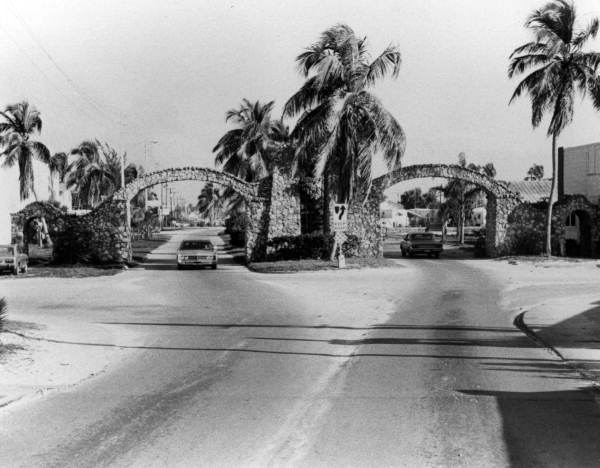
SR 865 passing through the historic coquina stone arches on the north side of the previous Matanzas Pass Bridge in 1977. The arches were demolished when the current bridge was built.

The entire route of SR 865 came into existence incrementally over the span of many decades. Present-day San Carlos Boulevard, originally known as Beach Road, was built in 1927 to serve as a direct route from McGregor Boulevard (SR 867) in Iona to Fort Myers Beach (originally known as Crescent Beach) on Estero Island. At the same time, a new Matanzas Pass Bridge was built, which was a small concrete bridge with a steel swing span. The 1927 Matanzas Pass Bridge replaced an earlier wooden drawbridge that had been destroyed by a hurricane a year prior. The original road to Fort Myers Beach ran along present-day San Carlos Drive (where the original wooden bridge was located) then ran northwest along the along the shore of San Carlos Bay to present-day Bunche Beach where it turned north along what is now John Morris Road to McGregor Boulevard.

Much of present-day Gladiolus Drive was built in the late 1920s as a more direct route from Beach Road to the Tamiami Trail. Originally known as Beach Cut-off Road, it passed through farmland that would be used for growing gladiolus flowers and bulbs in the 1930s and 1940s. Lee County was once known as the gladiolus capital of the world. A notable operator of the gladiolus fields was the A&W Bulb Company, which is today the namesake of A&W Bulb Road (a side street that today connects Gladiolus Drive to McGregor Boulevard). Beach Cut-off Road was officially renamed Gladiolus Drive in 1952.

Present-day Estero Boulevard, San Carlos Boulevard, and Gladiolus Drive were added to the state highway system in 1935 and were initially designated State Road 278. SR 278 would be redesignated as SR 865 during the 1945 Florida State Road renumbering.

=== Extension to Bonita Springs ===
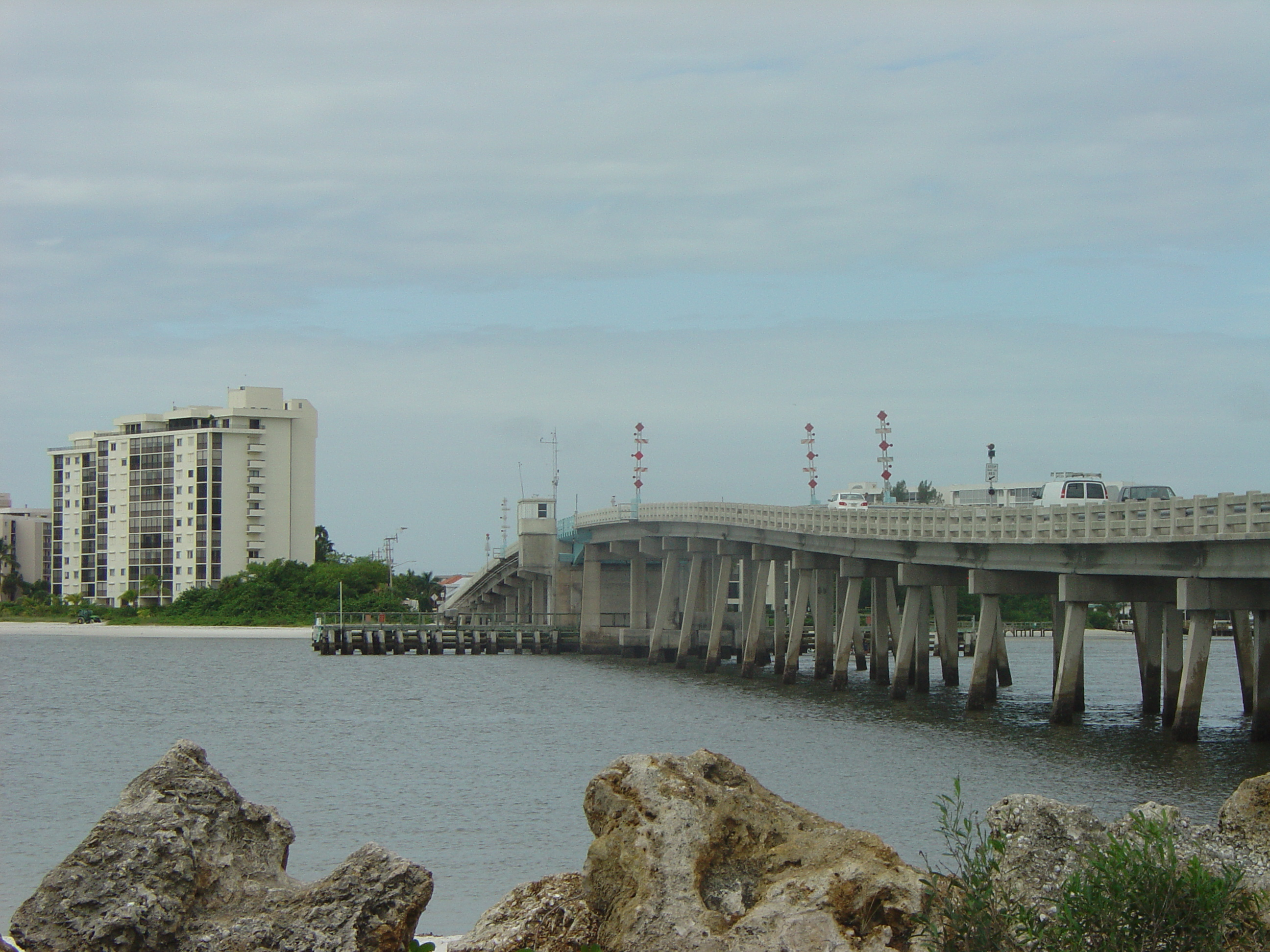
Original Big Carlos Pass Bridge, the northernmost bridge of the Bonita Beach Causeway, in 2007

Estero Boulevard reached the southern tip of Fort Myers Beach by 1950. The Bonita Beach Causeway was complete in 1965 which extended Estero Boulevard south from Fort Myers Beach to Little Hickory Island, where it connected to Hickory Boulevard. Upon the completion of the Bonita Beach Causeway, the SR 865 designation was extended south from Fort Myers Beach along the causeway, Hickory Boulevard, and Bonita Beach Road to US 41 (at present-day Old 41 Road). Bonita Beach Road was developed in the late 1920s and early 1930s to connect Downtown Bonita Springs with Bonita Beach. Hickory Boulevard was rebuilt from a dirt trail to a fully paved road in 1958.

The SR 865 designation was extended east along Bonita Beach Road (which was known as Carroll Road east of Bonita Springs at the time) to its historic southern terminus at Interstate 75 when that segment of the freeway opened in 1981.

In the late 1970s, the state began relinquishing segments of the route to county control.

=== Northern extension ===
The final segment of SR 865 and CR 865 to be built was Six Mile Cypress Parkway, which opened in 1983. Six Mile Cypress Parkway had been planned as early as the 1970s as a loop road along the Six Mile Cypress Slough connecting Gladiolus Drive to Ortiz Avenue. It was built by the county though the state would maintain control of the mile-long segment between US 41 and SR 739 (which was connected to Six Mile Cypress in 1991). The construction of Six Mile Cypress Parkway also led to the realignment Gladiolus Drive at its intersection with US 41 (Old Gladiolus Drive just to the south is the original alignment). The route of Six Mile Cypress Parkway from US 41 to the Ten Mile Canal (just west of SR 739) was historically the route of the Seaboard Air Line Railroad's Punta Rassa Subdivision which existed from 1926 to 1952.

Ortiz Avenue historically ran from SR 80 in Tice to SR 82 east of Downtown Fort Myers and was originally designated SR 80B. In the mid 1970s, the county built a 2.5-mile extension of Ortiz Avenue south from SR 82 to connect with an extension of Colonial Boulevard (SR 884). When Six Mile Cypress Parkway was complete, the CR 865 designation was extended north to include Ortiz Avenue.

Six Mile Cypress was widened to four lanes from US 41 to Daniels Parkway (CR 876) in 1991. In 2000, Six Mile Cypress was renamed Ben C. Pratt Six Mile Cypress Parkway in honor of former Lee County public works director Ben Pratt. The remaining two-lane segment of Six Mile Cypress Parkway from Daniels Parkway north to just south of Winkler Avenue was widened to four lanes in 2012.

=== Later changes ===
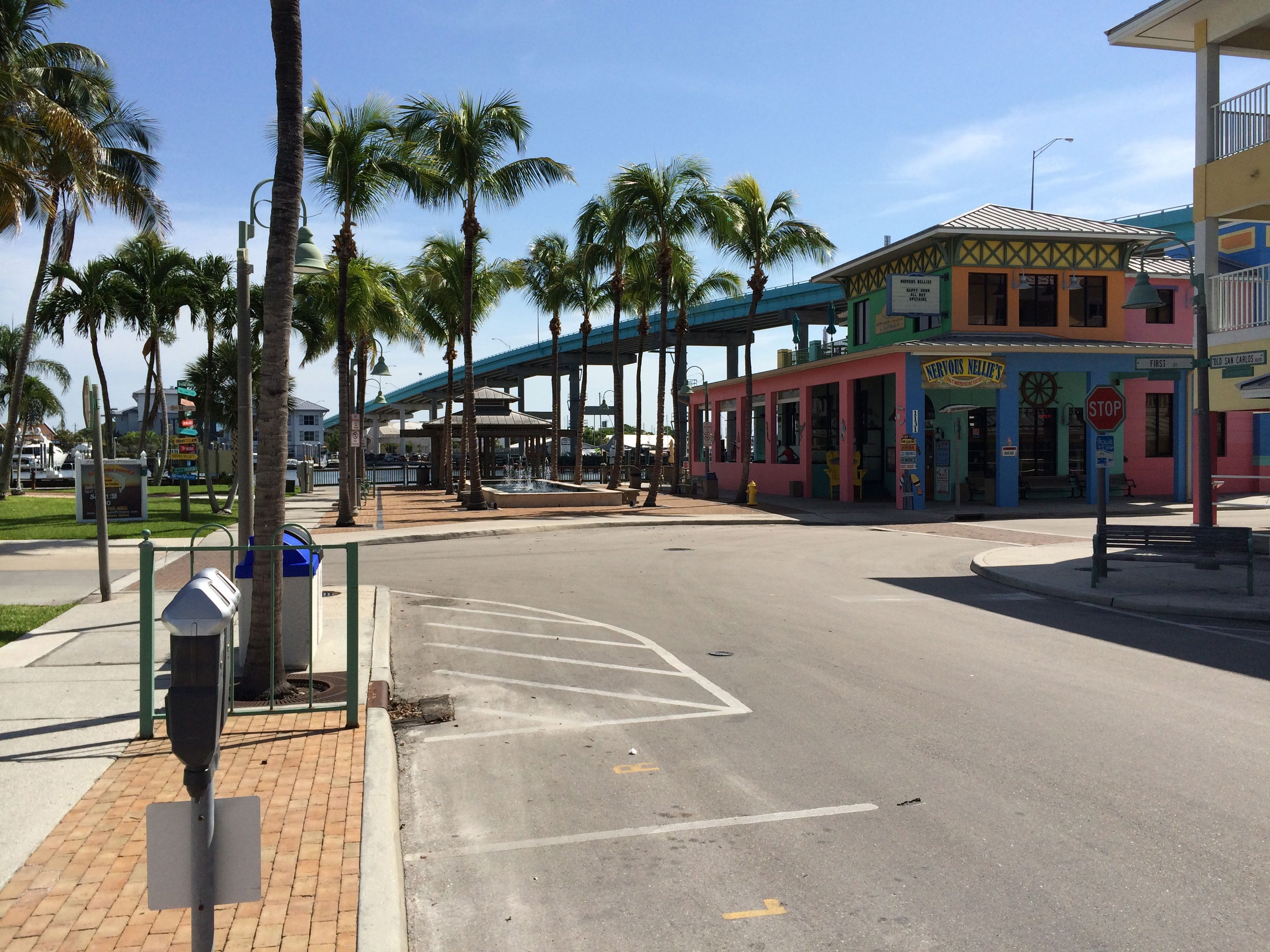
Former SR 865 on Fort Myers Beach (Old San Carlos Boulevard) where the previous Matanzas Pass Bridge was located.

The current Matanzas Pass Bridge opened to traffic on October 15, 1979. As a result, SR 865 was realigned slightly to accommodate the bridge's height. The previous alignment where the old bridge was located is now Old San Carlos Boulevard on the island side. The road linking Estero Boulevard to Old San Carlos Boulevard was subsequently closed to vehicular traffic and is now a pedestrian-only street known as Times Square.

The northernmost 0.2 miles (0.32 km) of San Carlos Boulevard (in Iona) was annexed to SR 867 when McGregor Boulevard was realigned slightly south in the 1983 (Old McGregor Boulevard is the original alignment). In 1994, Gladiolus Drive was realigned onto a new four-lane road west of Pine Ridge Road to intersect with San Carlos Boulevard at the realigned McGregor Boulevard. The original alignment of Gladiolus Drive is now Paul Schultz Way. Further improvements were made to Gladiolus Drive in 1996, when it was widened to six lanes from US 41 (Tamiami Trail) to Summerlin Road (CR 869), and to four lanes from there to Winkler Road. The rest of Gladiolus Drive was widened to a multi-lane road in 2009.

== Major intersections ==
The entire route is in Lee County.

| Location | mi | km | Destinations | Notes |
|---|---|---|---|---|
| Bonita Springs | 0.0 | 0.0 | Palmira Boulevard / Bonita Beach Road east | Road continues east without designation |
| Bonita Springs | 2.2 | 3.5 | I-75 – Naples, Tampa | Exit 116 on I-75 (unsigned SR 93) |
| Bonita Springs | 3.0 | 4.8 | Imperial Parkway (CR 881) | |
| Bonita Springs | 4.0 | 6.4 | Old 41 Road (CR 887) | Former US 41 |
| Bonita Springs | 5.6 | 9.0 | US 41 (Tamiami Trail) | |
| Estero Bay | 10.2– 14.1 | 16.4– 22.7 | Bonita Beach Causeway | |
| Fort Myers Beach | 20.0 0.000 | 32.2 0.000 | Estero Boulevard west – Beaches | Southern terminus of SR 865 |
| Matanzas Pass | 0.138– 0.539 | 0.222– 0.867 | Matanzas Pass Bridge | |
| | 3.122 | 5.024 | CR 869 (Summerlin Road) – Sanibel, Captiva, Fort Myers, Lakes Park | Diamond interchange |
| Iona | 4.641 0.0 | 7.469 0.0 | SR 867 north / CR 867 south (McGregor Boulevard) – Sanibel, Captiva | Northern terminus of SR 865 |
| | 3.3 | 5.3 | CR 869 (Summerlin Road) – Fort Myers Beach, Sanibel, Captiva | Left turn flyover ramps |
| | 4.8 0.0 | 7.7 0.0 | US 41 (Tamiami Trail) | Southern terminus of SR 865 |
| | 1.156 0.0 | 1.860 0.0 | SR 739 (Metro Parkway / Michael G. Rippe Parkway) | Northern terminus of SR 865 |
| | 1.7 | 2.7 | CR 876 (Daniels Parkway) to I-75 – International Airport, JetBlue Park | |
| Fort Myers | 6.7 | 10.8 | SR 884 (Colonial Boulevard) to I-75 / US 41 | Continuous flow intersection |
| Fort Myers | 8.5 | 13.7 | SR 82 (Dr. Martin Luther King Jr. Boulevard) – Fort Myers, Immokalee | |
| Fort Myers | 9.7 | 15.6 | Luckett Road (CR 810) to I-75 | |
| Tice | 11.1 | 17.9 | SR 80 (Palm Beach Boulevard) to I-75 | |
1.000 mi = 1.609 km; 1.000 km = 0.621 mi: Route transition
