= Estero Island =

Island in Lee County, Florida, United States

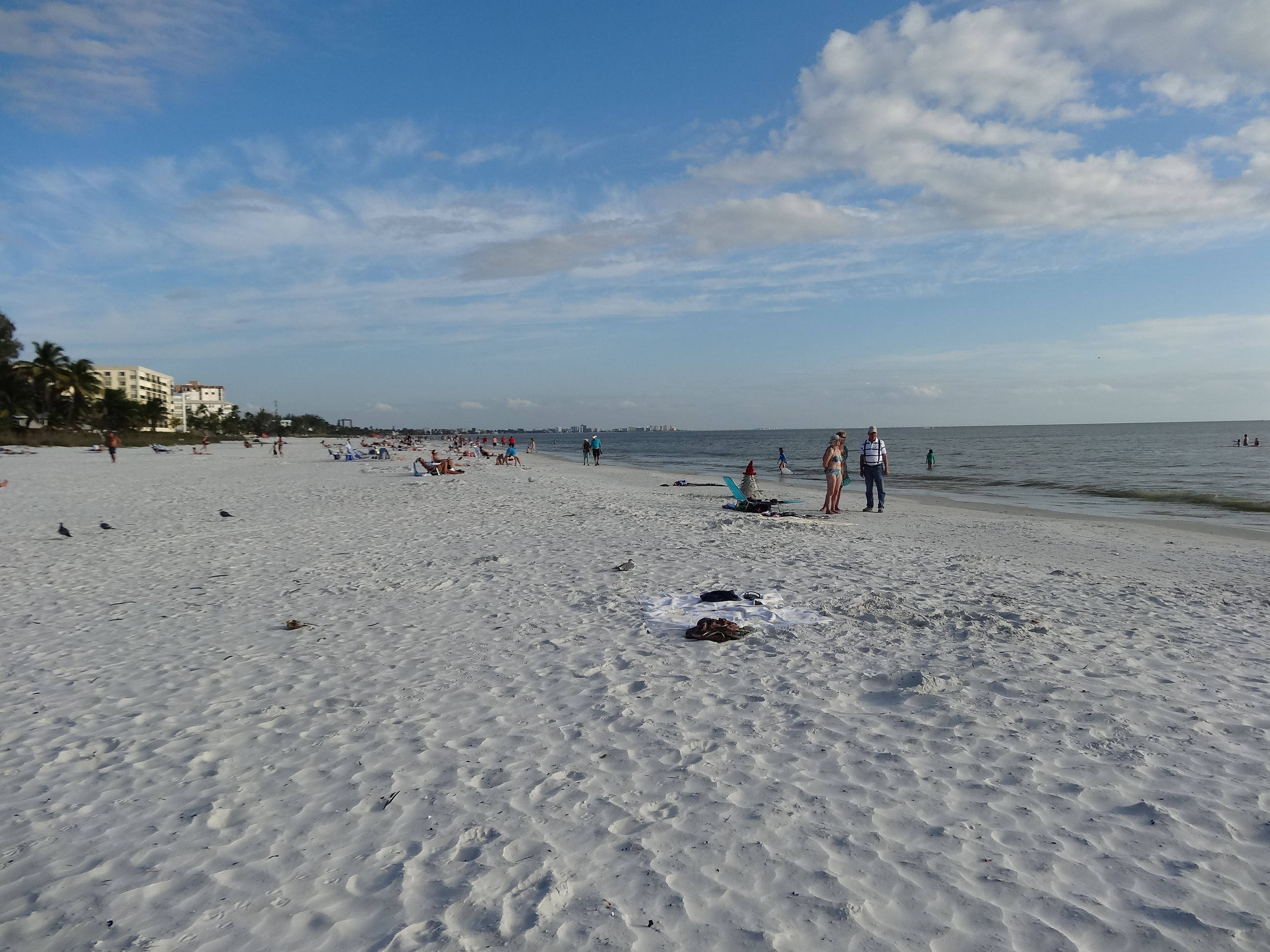
- Estero Island Beach

- Estero Island Estero Island (the Caribbean)

Geography
- Location: Lee County, Florida
- Coordinates: 26°26′12″N 81°55′13″W
- Adjacent to: Gulf of Mexico

Administration
- United States
- State: Florida
- County: Lee

Estero Island is an island located in Lee County, Florida, on the Gulf coast of Southwest Florida. It is bordered by San Carlos Island to the north and Big Carlos Pass to the south. The Matanzas Pass Bridge is on the northern end of the island and connects Estero Island over Matanzas Pass to San Carlos Island. The Big Carlos Bridge (part of the Bonita Beach Causeway) connects the southern end of the island to Black Island (the northern limit of the city of Bonita Springs).

== Communities ==
The island is part of the town of Fort Myers Beach.
