= Potential Tropical Cyclone Ten =

Atlantic potential tropical cyclone in 2017

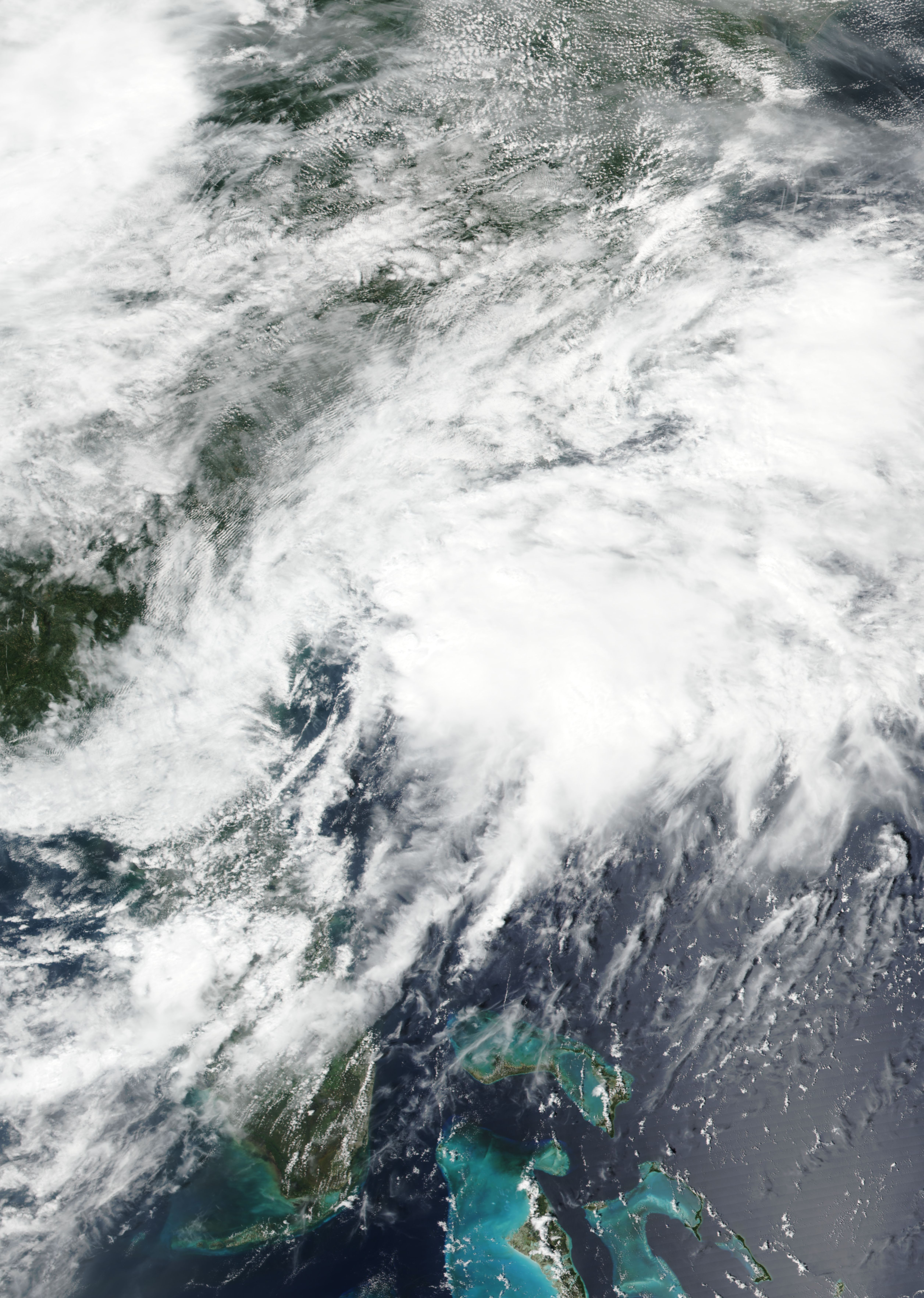
- Potential Tropical Cyclone Ten at peak intensity on August 28 off the North Carolina coast

Meteorological history
- Formed: August 27, 2017
- Extratropical: August 29, 2017
- Dissipated: September 3, 2017

Potential tropical cyclone
- 1-minute sustained (SSHWS/NWS)
- Highest winds: 45 mph (75 km/h) (80 mph (130 km/h) while extratropical)
- Lowest pressure: 1004 mbar (hPa); 29.65 inHg (971 mbar (27.92 inHg) while extratropical)

Overall effects
- Fatalities: 2 total
- Damage: >$1.92 million (2017 USD)
- Areas affected: Leeward Islands, Puerto Rico, Bahamas, Southeastern United States, Mid-Atlantic states, New England, Atlantic Canada
- Part of the 2017 Atlantic hurricane season

Potential Tropical Cyclone Ten was a damaging storm that was the tenth tropical disturbance designated by the National Hurricane Center (NHC) during the 2017 Atlantic hurricane season. The disturbance was deemed to have a very high chance of becoming a tropical cyclone while posing a threat to populated areas and was designated a "potential tropical cyclone". The storm caused flooding and brought tropical storm-force winds to parts of the Southeastern United States and the Mid-Atlantic states, particularly Florida and the Carolinas, before it affected parts of Atlantic Canada. Potential Tropical Cyclone Ten was the tenth storm that had advisories issued on it by the NHC in 2017, and the only such system that failed to fully develop into a tropical cyclone during that Atlantic hurricane season. Potential Tropical Cyclone Ten originated from a tropical wave that moved off the coast of West Africa on August 13. The disturbance slowly tracked its way westward across the Atlantic Ocean, before reaching Florida in late August. The disturbance came close to developing into a tropical storm while it was situated off the coast of the Carolinas; however, strong wind shear and outflow from Hurricane Harvey prevented the storm from organizing into a tropical cyclone. The system transitioned into an extratropical cyclone instead, and became a strong hurricane-force low to the south of Newfoundland, before being absorbed by another extratropical system near Iceland on September 3.

The storm caused flooding across Florida, especially around Fort Myers and other areas in southwestern Florida, forcing the evacuation of more than 200 people. The disturbance dropped a maximum total of rainfall in excess of 30 inches (76 cm) of rain in Ten Mile Canal and Six Mile Cypress Slough Preserve, in southwestern Florida, in addition to 18 inches (46 cm) of rain in the western parts of Fort Myers. The flooding was the worst seen in western Florida in at least 20 years. Overall, the storm killed two people and caused more than $1.923 million (2017 USD) in damages. Less than two weeks after the storm, Hurricane Irma made landfall in southwestern Florida, which further compounded the damage in the region.

== Background ==
Beginning in 2017, the National Hurricane Center (NHC) decided to issue advisories, and thus allow watches and warnings to be issued on disturbances that are not yet tropical cyclones but have a high chance to become one, and are expected to bring tropical storm or hurricane conditions to landmasses within 48 hours. Such systems are termed "Potential Tropical Cyclones". Advisories on these storms contain the same content as typical tropical cyclone advisories, including track forecasts, and cyclone watches and warnings, similar to advisories that the NHC issues on active tropical cyclones. This was first demonstrated on June 18 with the designation of Potential Tropical Cyclone Two, which later developed into Tropical Storm Bret, east-southeast of the Windward Islands. In addition, the numbering that a potential tropical cyclone receives would be retained for the rest of the hurricane season, meaning that the next tropical system or disturbance would be designated with the following number, even though potential tropical cyclones are not treated as tropical cyclones. This was first demonstrated with Potential Tropical Cyclone Ten, which failed to develop into a tropical cyclone. After that storm's formation and dissipation, one of the following tropical systems, which would eventually become Hurricane Katia, was designated as "Tropical Depression Thirteen", even though the Atlantic hurricane season had a total of only 12 tropical cyclones at that point. Potential Tropical Cyclone Ten was the first system so designated not to become an organize as a tropical cyclone.

== Meteorological history ==
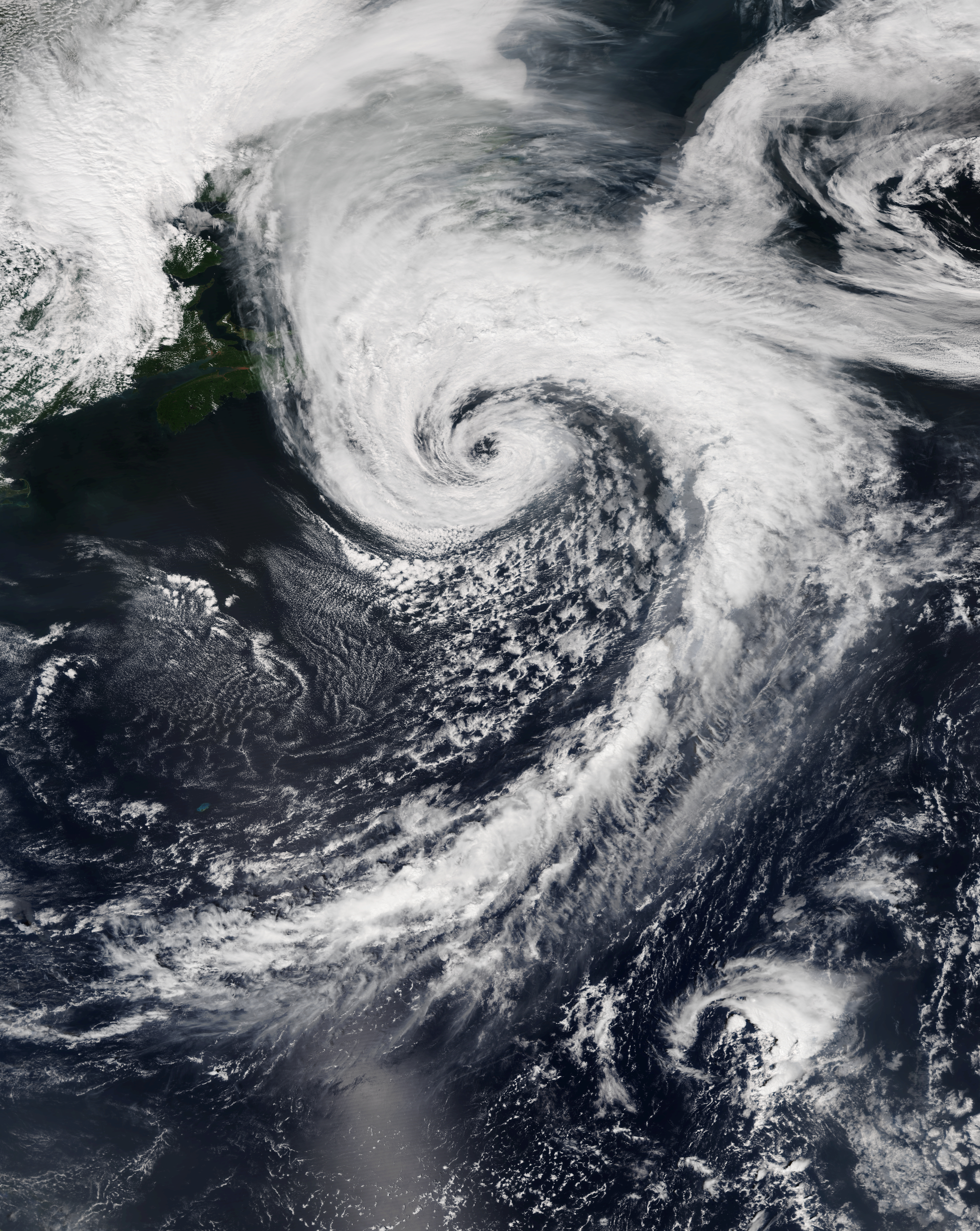
Potential Tropical Cyclone Ten as a powerful extratropical cyclone on August 31.

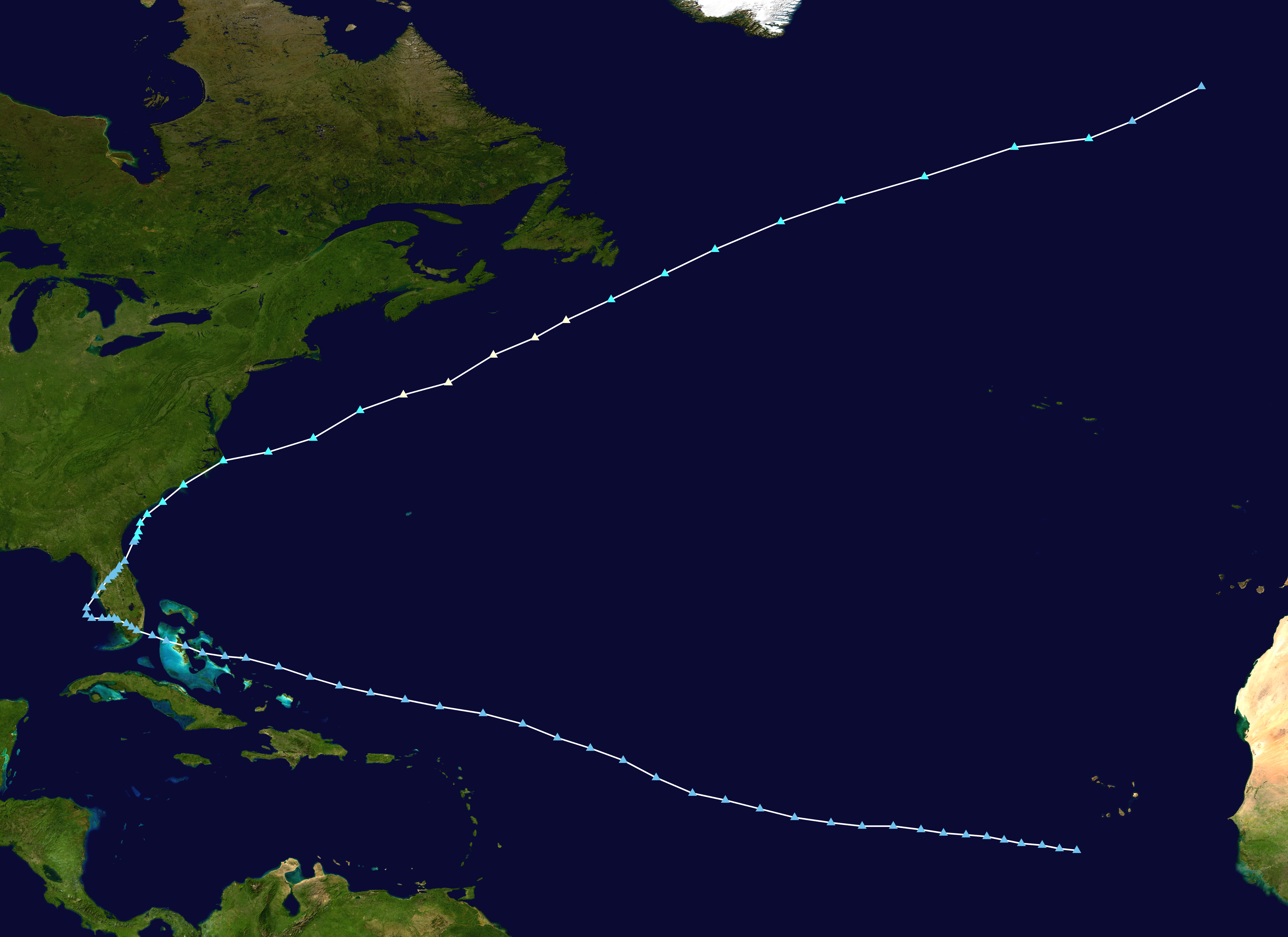
Map plotting the storm's track and intensity, according to the Saffir–Simpson scale Map key Saffir–Simpson scale Tropical depression (≤38 mph, ≤62 km/h) Tropical storm (39–73 mph, 63–118 km/h) Category 1 (74–95 mph, 119–153 km/h) Category 2 (96–110 mph, 154–177 km/h) Category 3 (111–129 mph, 178–208 km/h) Category 4 (130–156 mph, 209–251 km/h) Category 5 (≥157 mph, ≥252 km/h) Unknown Storm type Tropical cyclone Subtropical cyclone Extratropical cyclone, remnant low, tropical disturbance, or monsoon depression

At the beginning of August 13, the National Hurricane Center (NHC) began monitoring a tropical wave on the western coast of Africa, which quickly emerged into the eastern Atlantic. Amid favorable environmental conditions, the wave was expected to merge with a broad area of low pressure southwest of Cape Verde and gradually organize thereafter. Instead, the two disturbances remained separate, with the broad trough to the west continuing westward and the tropical wave moving farther north. The system farther to the west accelerated further and eventually developed into Tropical Storm Harvey on August 17 (which later became a hurricane), while the tropical wave to the east lagged behind. On August 18, the disturbance behind Harvey became increasingly organized and was given a 70% chance of developing into a tropical cyclone within 2 days; however, increased wind shear weakened the system and prevented it from attaining full tropical characteristics. The disturbance remained disorganized while moving northwestward over the next several days, reaching the Bahamas on August 21. The disturbance crossed south Florida on August 23, and stalled to the west of the peninsula for the next two days. On August 25, the storm moved over central Florida and stalled there for two days, before emerging off the east coast of Florida on August 27. Late on August 27, the system organized significantly off the coast of Georgia; as the system was expected to develop into a tropical cyclone within 2 days and posed a hazard to the Southeastern United States, the NHC designated the storm as Potential Tropical Cyclone Ten and initiated advisories on the storm.

At the time of its designation on August 27, Potential Tropical Cyclone Ten was given a 90% chance of becoming a tropical storm within the next 2 days. Due to the storm's organization and its proximity to land, Tropical Storm Watches and Warnings were issued for the coasts of North and South Carolina. However, the storm remained disorganized and lacked a closed low-level circulation. On August 28, Potential Tropical Cyclone Ten's central pressure reached 1,006 millibars (29.7 inHg), and the storm had 1-minute sustained winds of 40 mph (65 km/h), (Note: All values for sustained wind estimates are sustained over 1 minute, unless otherwise specified.) equivalent to that of a minimal tropical storm. However, the system still lacked a closed low-level circulation center, and increasing wind shear from the southeast and outflow from Hurricane Harvey (which was now a tropical storm) was beginning to inhibit the system's chances of tropical development. As the system accelerated to the northeast, the storm expanded in size, though it grew increasingly disorganized. As the storm moved past the Carolinas, on August 29, the disturbance brought thunderstorms to the region, in addition to tropical storm-force winds. The NHC noted that the disturbance had "very cold, but extremely deep asymmetric convection", with all of the thunderstorms around the center displaced to the east, due to strong wind shear. Around that time, the disturbance began interacting with a baroclinic zone, causing the disturbance to begin transitioning into an extratropical cyclone. Late on August 29, at 18:00 UTC, Potential Tropical Cyclone Ten completed its transition into an extratropical cyclone, even as it finished developing a closed low-level circulation, while situated off the coast of North Carolina; as such, the NHC issued their final advisory on the storm and cancelled the tropical storm warnings in the area. The storm strengthened as it became extratropical, with the disturbance's minimum central pressure reaching 1,004 millibars (29.6 inHg) and the storm's sustained winds reaching 45 mph (75 km/h), just as it completed its transition. During the next couple of days, Ten's extratropical remnant quickly intensified, while accelerating to the northeast. On August 31, at 12:00 UTC, Potential Tropical Cyclone Ten's remnant reached a peak intensity of 971 millibars (28.7 inHg) to the south of Newfoundland, with hurricane-force sustained winds at 75 mph (120 km/h). Afterward, Ten's extratropical remnant weakened, and the system began to be drawn into another extratropical storm near Iceland, on September 3. Later on the same day, Potential Tropical Cyclone Ten's remnant was fully absorbed by the larger extratropical cyclone, southwest of Iceland. This extratropical system was named Windstorm Perryman by the Free University of Berlin on September 4; Windstorm Perryman subsequently impacted Ireland and the United Kingdom.

== Preparations and impact ==
=== Florida ===
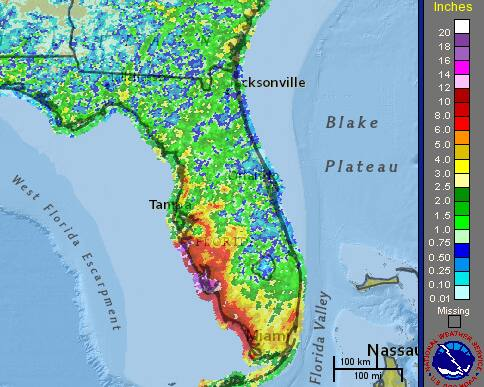
Map of the total rainfall from Potential Tropical Cyclone Ten in Florida.

During the system's time in Florida, the storm caused torrential rainfall and also triggered flooding across the state, especially in southwestern Florida. The floods were described as the worst that western Florida had seen in at least 20 years. Lee County was the hardest hit, particularly the Island Park neighborhood in the southern part of Fort Myers. The region experienced several days of rainfall, which caused Millet Creek and Ten Mile Canal to overflow, leading to widespread flooding in the area. A maximum total of rainfall in excess of 30 inches (76 cm) was recorded in Ten Mile Canal and in Six Mile Cypress Slough Preserve, which was equivalent to roughly 60% of the annual rainfall totals that those areas normally see. The western portions of Fort Myers reported 18 inches (46 cm) of rainfall, which was equivalent to about 55% of the city's annual rainfall total. On Monday, August 28, water levels peaked at a depth of 4 feet (1.2 m) on Island Park Road, on U.S. Highway 41. Flooding from the storm forced the rescue of more than 200 people and 37 animals, all of whom were evacuated. There was only one road leading into and out of more than a dozen gated communities along Island Park Road, which made it difficult for people to evacuate from the floods. Numerous homes were damaged by the floodwaters, including those in an RV park near the highway. Schools were closed across Lee and Collier Counties, and numerous roads were closed. Many roads were covered by more than 3 feet (0.91 m) of water, and several cars were stalled on Island Park Road.

In Lee County, around the Fort Boca Grande area, over 6 inches (15 cm) of rain fell across the area from August 26 to 27, with Cape Coral recording 12.09 inches (30.7 cm) of rain over a 72-hour period; this led to extreme flooding from August 27 to 28. Floodwaters entered 11 homes in Captiva and breached some trailer homes in the Coastal Estate Trailer Parks; another 30 trailers in the Tropical Trailer Park experienced waist-deep floodwaters. Numerous roads around Captiva, Cape Coral, Sanibel, and Pine Island were covered by floodwaters 1–3 feet (0.30–0.91 m) deep, requiring 7 car rescues from first responders. The floods resulted in $300,000 (2017 USD) in property damage in the Fort Boca Grande area. In Manatee County, up to 17 inches (43 cm) of rain fell from August 26 to 28, causing numerous instances of street flooding, floating cars on State Road 70, and forcing the rescue of one person. In the Longbeach area, floodwaters entered numerous homes and businesses, with 67 homes experiencing over a foot (0.3 meters) of water, mostly in the Centre Lake Community, forcing the families living there to evacuate; water also entered homes along Manatee Avenue West around 38th Street West. On the evening of August 27, a 61-year-old man drowned in the Sara Palms neighborhood of the Longbeach area when his wheelchair tipped over into the floodwaters. The flooding in Manatee County caused $1.34 million (2017 USD) in property damage. In Fort Myers Beach, in Lee County, heavy rainfall from August 27 to 28 resulting in localized flooding, with floodwaters breaching mobile homes in Estero and Bonita Springs. The floods forced the evacuation of 70 people from a mobile home park in Estero, and another 116 from a mobile home park in Bonita Springs, due to rising floodwaters from the Imperial River. The floods in Fort Myers Beach caused $100,000 (2017 USD) in property damage. In the neighboring Sarasota County, a maximum total of 16 inches (41 cm) of rain fell across the area from August 26 to 28, which caused numerous instances of street flooding, and resulted in $50,000 (2017 USD) in property damage. On the afternoon of August 27, a 73-year-old man in Longboat Key drowned when his car was carried away by floodwaters into a drainage ditch, after he tried driving through a flooded parking lot at a dog park.

The disturbance was also responsible for severe weather in Florida. From August 23 to 28, at least 21 storm reports were filed, including multiple instances of wind damage from severe thunderstorms. On August 24, at 10:05 a.m. EDT, a funnel cloud was reported in Hilolo, in Okeechobee County. A trained weather spotter reported observing the funnel cloud near Fort Drum, while he was driving northward on U.S. Highway 441. On August 26, at 8:19 p.m. EDT, an EF0 tornado touched down in Samoset, in Manatee County, before lifting three minutes later, at 8:22 p.m. EDT. A couple of witnesses reported seeing a funnel cloud in the area around the time when the tornado touched down. The tornado left a narrow path of damage and caused minor damage at a County Public Works Facility, in addition to throwing around aluminum debris and downing multiple trees. The tornado caused $20,000 (2017 USD) in damage. Overall, the storm killed two people in Florida and caused more than $1.923 million (2017 USD) in damages. Less than two weeks later, Hurricane Irma made landfall in southwestern Florida, which further compounded the damage in the region.

=== Elsewhere ===
On August 27, the NHC anticipated Potential Tropical Cyclone Ten to develop into a tropical storm within 48 hours, and as such, they issued Tropical Storm Watches and Warnings for the Carolinas on August 27. The disturbance was also expected to bring up to 9 inches (23 cm) of rain to parts of coastal South Carolina and the Outer Banks, along with a possible storm surge. When Potential Tropical Cyclone Ten brushed the coastline of the Carolinas, the storm brought gale-force winds at tropical storm strength, flash flooding, and high surf to the area. However, the impacts in the Carolinas were rather minimal. The storm also brought rainfall and high surf to other states in the Northeastern United States, as it moved northeastward. After Potential Tropical Cyclone Ten transitioned into an extratropical storm, the system brought tropical storm conditions to Atlantic Canada, including gusty winds and high surf, with the Canadian Hurricane Centre (CHC) issuing an alert for the area.

== See also ==
- Weather in 2017
- Tropical Storm Jerry (1995) – Caused one of the largest flood events in western Florida prior to this system
- Hurricane Gabrielle (2001) – Affected some of the same areas; caused significant flooding damage in Florida
- Hurricane Arthur (2014) – Affected the same areas
- Hurricane Matthew (2016) – Caused flooding in the same areas
- Hurricane Dorian (2019) – Devastated the Bahamas and also affected the same areas
