= Bonita Beach Causeway =

Bridge in Florida, United States of America

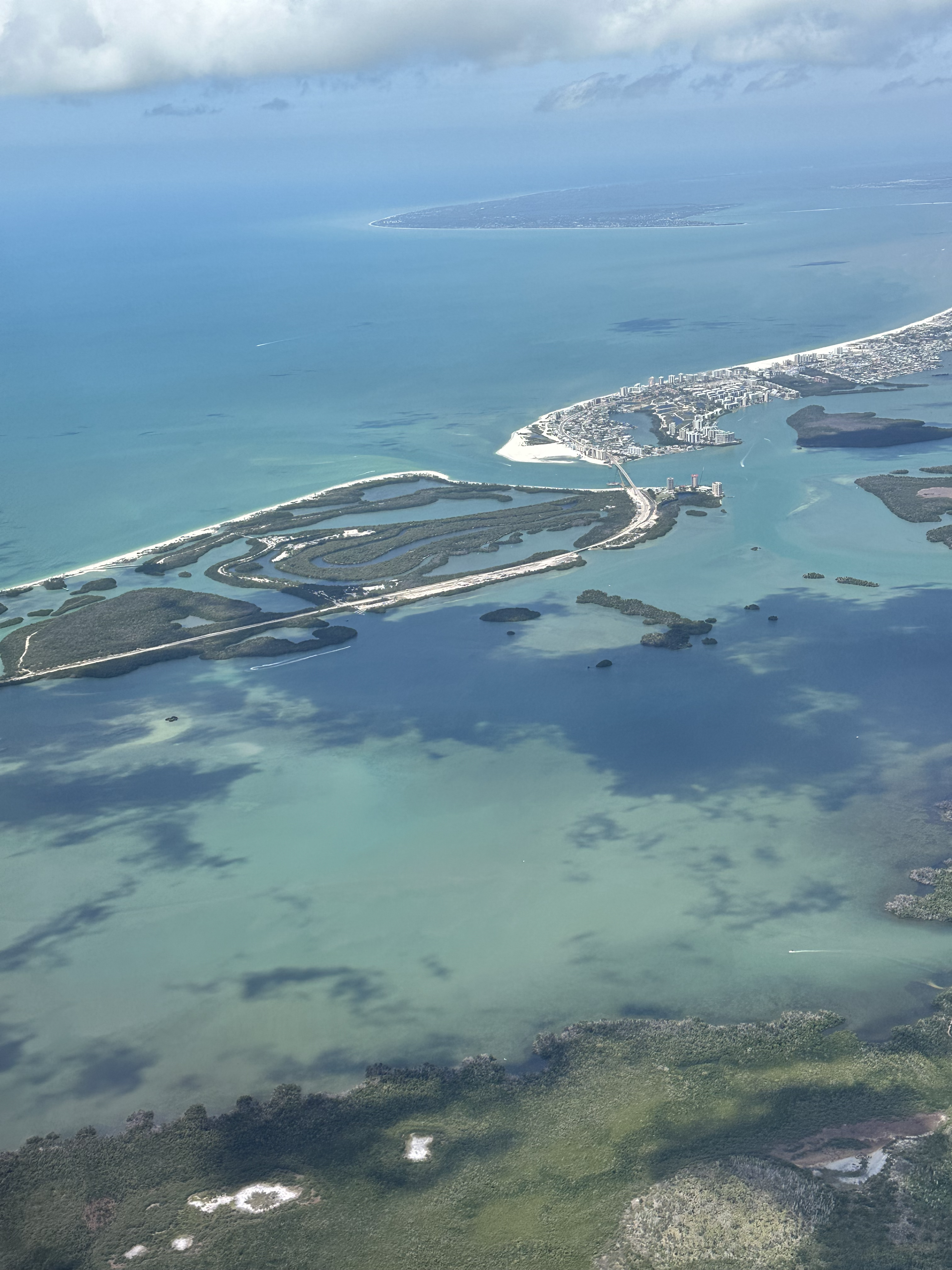
- North end of the Bonita Beach Causeway
- Coordinates: 26°24′16″N 81°52′51″W
- Carries: CR 865 (Estero Boulevard)
- Crosses: Big Carlos Pass; Little Carlos Pass; New Pass; Big Hickory Pass
- Locale: Bonita Springs, Florida
- Maintained by: Lee County Department of Transportation

Characteristics
- Design: 1 steel bascule bridge & 3 concrete girder bridges
- Total length: 4.1 miles (6.6 km)

History
- Opened: July 4, 1965 (original causeway and bridges); November 14, 2025 (current Big Carlos Pass Bridge)

Statistics
- Toll: None

Location
- Interactive map of Bonita Beach Causeway

The Bonita Beach Causeway is a causeway with a series of four low-level bridges located in Southwest Florida traversing the barrier islands of Estero Bay connecting the town of Fort Myers Beach with Bonita Springs. It carries Estero Boulevard (County Road 865) and is 4.1 miles (6.6 km) long from end to end. Each bridge on the Bonita Beach Causeway is named after the body of water it crosses.

== Route description ==
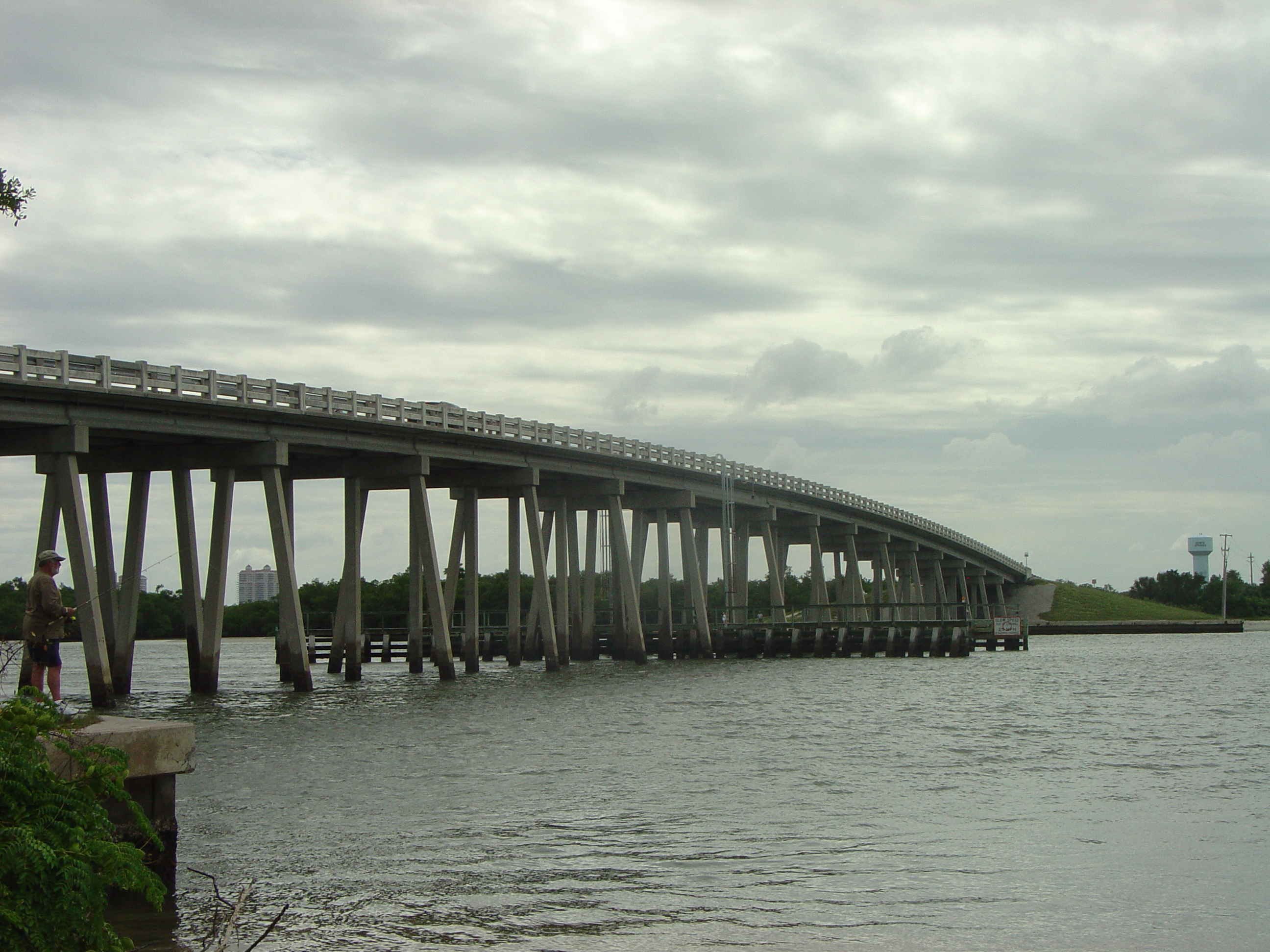
New Pass Bridge

Estero Boulevard (which crosses the causeway) begins just south of the Bonita Beach Causeway on Little Hickory Island, splitting off from Hickory Boulevard (County Road 865). It heads north and crosses Big Hickory Pass Bridge, which lands on Big Hickory Island. After a short distance, it then crosses the New Pass Bridge, and lands on Long Key, and enters the Lovers Key / Carl E. Johnson State Park. After crossing the Little Carlos Pass Bridge onto Black Key, Estero Boulevard turns west and crosses the Big Carlos Pass Bridge, a 60-foot high span bridge, onto Estero Island, and the town of Fort Myers Beach.

== History ==
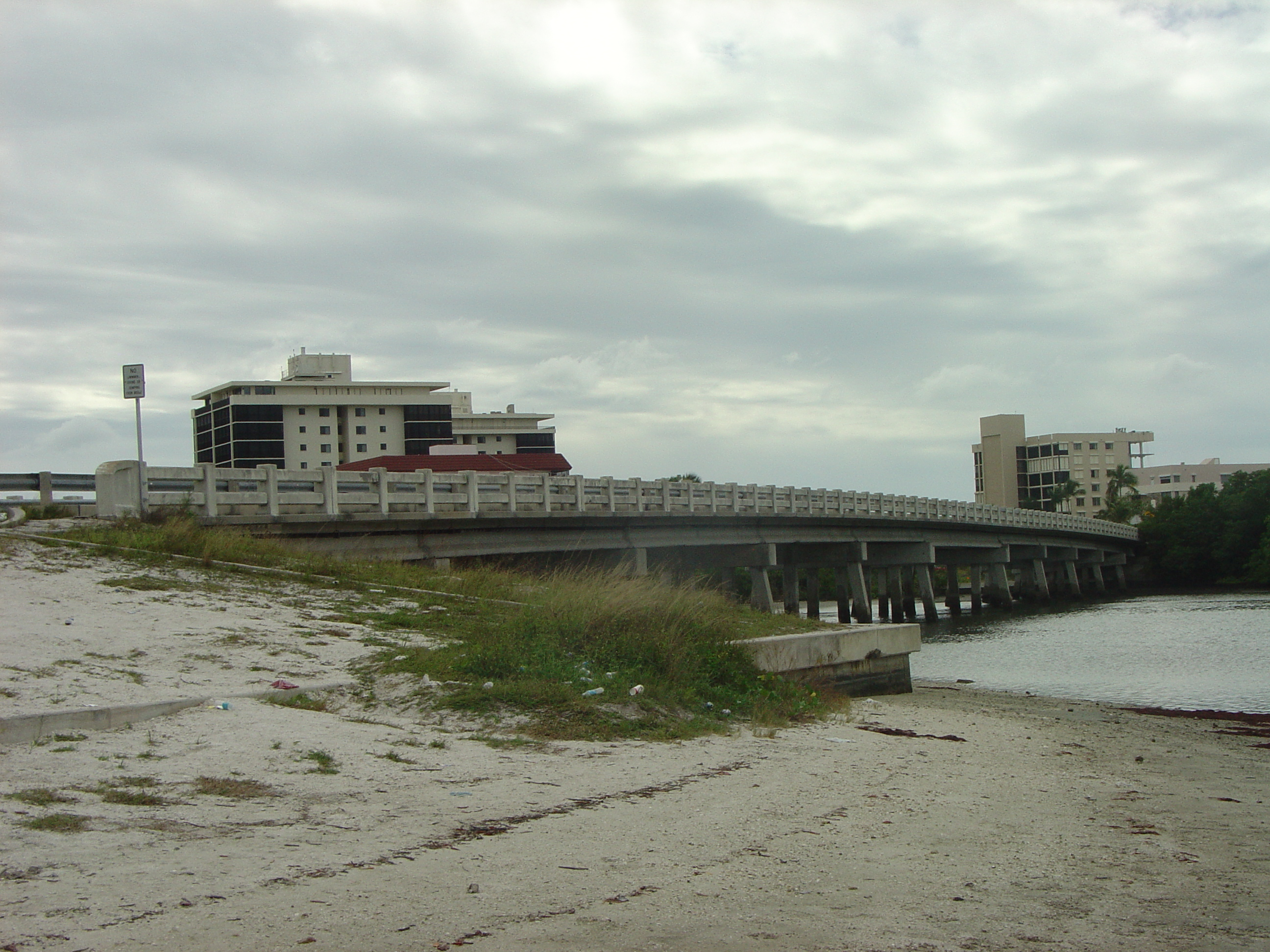
Big Hickory Pass Bridge

Before the causeway's construction, the only way to access Estero Island and Fort Myers Beach by car was via the Matanzas Pass Bridge (which was still a small swing bridge at this time). The swing bridge's machinery was highly unreliable, which concerned islanders who feared the bridge would break down in the event of an emergency, such as a hurricane evacuation. The islanders felt having a second exit for the island for safety reasons would be wise.

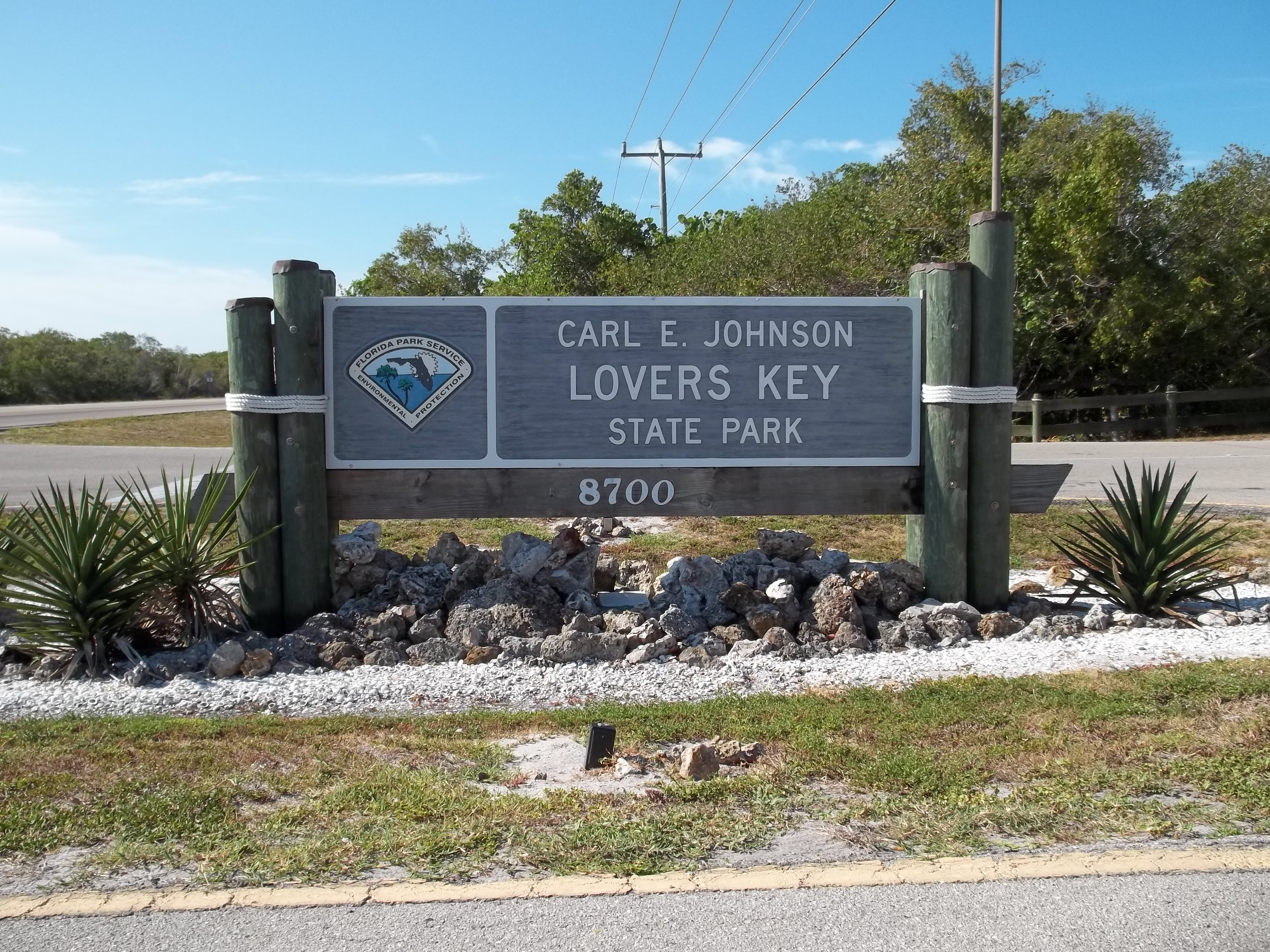
The entrance to the Lovers Key / Carl E. Johnson State Park

The county then decided the most feasible location for a second bridge to Estero Island was to build a causeway and a series of bridges from the south end of the island over barrier islands to Bonita Springs. The causeway's exact routing was selected by surveyor Carl Johnson (for whom Lovers Key / Carl E. Johnson State Park was named), and he became known as the father of the project. Construction began in 1963, and the causeway opened on July 4, 1965.

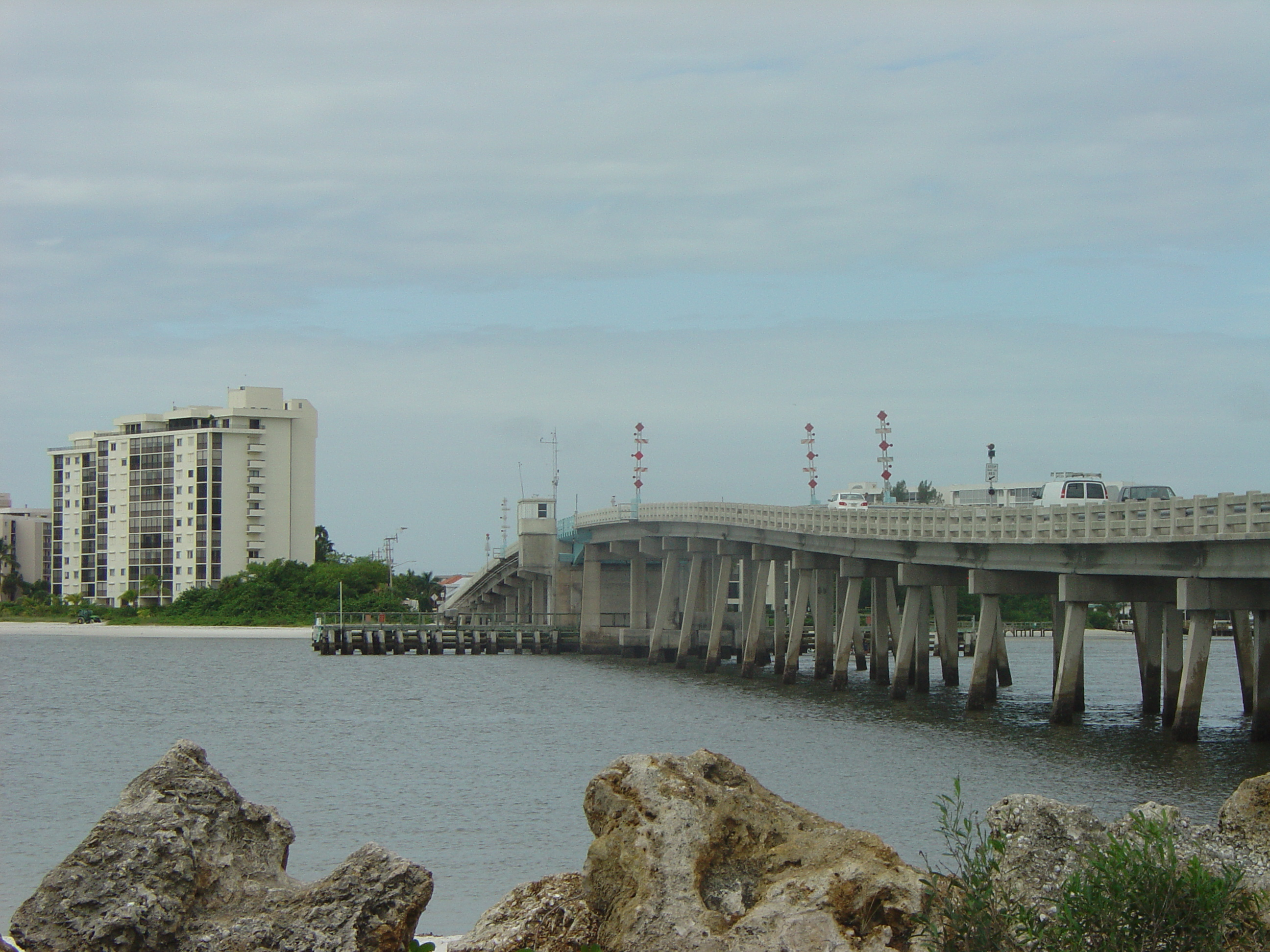
Original Big Carlos Pass Bridge in 2007

The current Big Carlos Pass Bridge, which is 60 feet tall, opened for traffic on November 14, 2025. It replaced the original Big Carlos Pass Bridge, which was a small single-leaf bascule bridge.
