= Lovers Key State Park =

State park in Florida, United States

- Lovers Key Carl E. Johnson State Park
- IUCN category V (protected landscape/seascape)
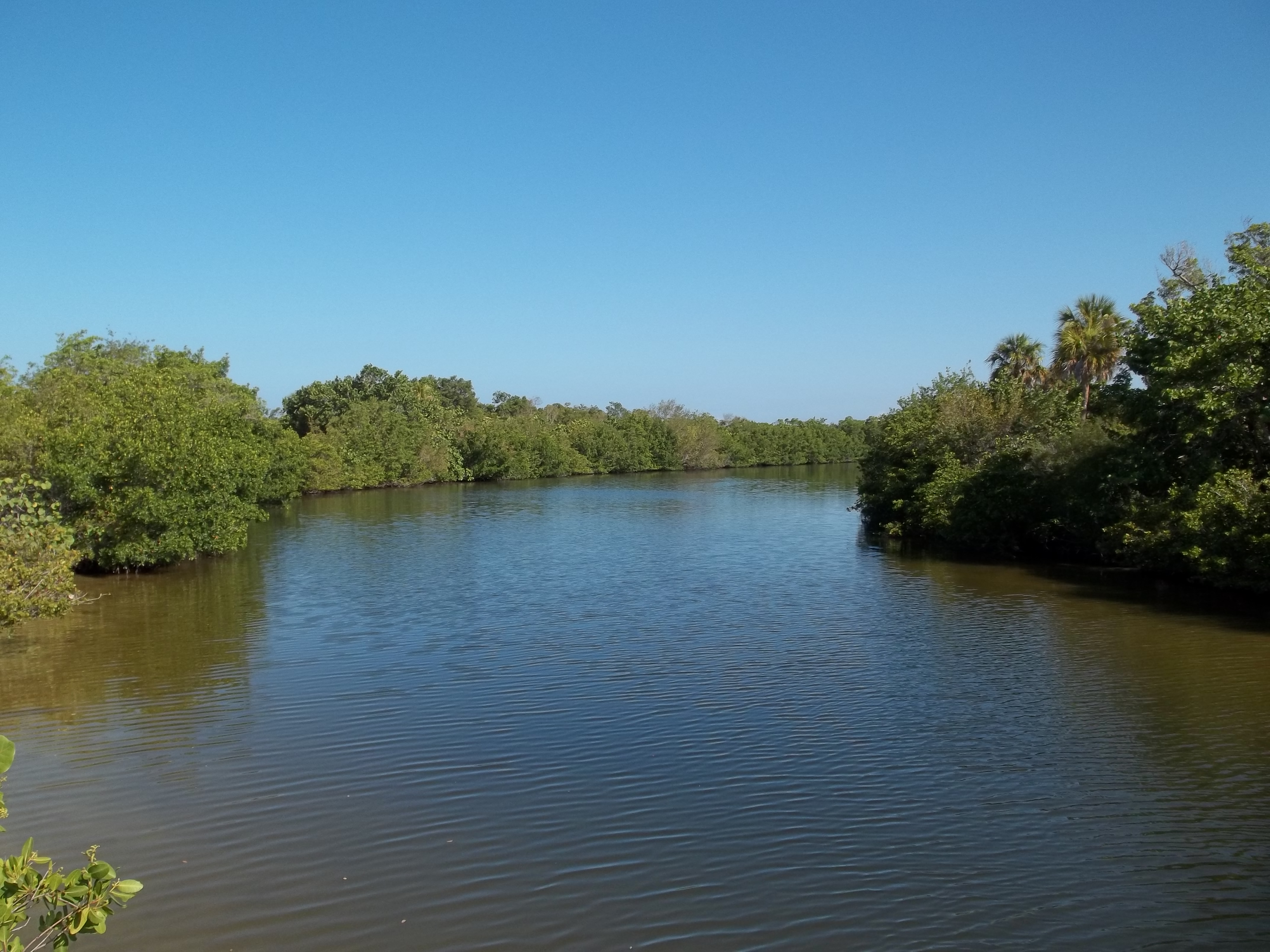

- Location within Florida Location within the United States
- Interactive map of Lovers Key State Park
- Location: Lee County, Florida, United States
- Nearest city: Bonita Springs, Florida
- Coordinates: 26°23′38″N 81°52′44″W
- Area: 712 acres (2.88 km^{2})
- Governing body: Florida Department of Environmental Protection

Lovers Key State Park is a 712-acre (2.88 km^{2}) Florida State Park located on Lover's Key and three other barrier islands—Black Island, Inner and Long Key. It is at 8700 Estero Blvd., Fort Myers Beach, between Big Carlos Pass and New Pass and 10.5 miles (16.9 km) west of Interstate 75 on exit 116. The park lies within the city limits of Bonita Springs and is just north of Bonita Beach. The park uses a Fort Myers Beach zip code for address purposes.

Activities include shelling, swimming, picnicking, boating, and sunbathing, as well as canoeing/kayaking, hiking, bicycling and wildlife viewing. Among the wildlife of the park are West Indian manatees, bottlenose dolphins, marsh rabbits, and over 40 bird species, including roseate spoonbills, osprey, snowy egret, bald eagles, and American kestrel. Black Island has woodpeckers, hawks, owls and warblers.

Amenities include a two-mile (3 km) long beach on Lovers Key. Black Island has over five miles (8 km) of multiuse trails; bicycle, canoe, and kayak rentals, gazebo, picnic areas, boat ramp, and two playgrounds. The park is open from 8:00 am till sundown year-round. A welcome and discovery centre operates on Black Island with seasonally changing hours, exhibits include displays on the park's habitats and the human history of the park.

The park was heavily impacted by the Hurricane Ian which struck on September 28, 2022. Heavy rains, high wind, and roughly 15-18ft of storm surge left the park devastated.

== History ==
Acquired by the state in 1983, the park was inaugurated in 1996 when the state held land was merged with the former Carl E. Johnson County Park to form Lover's Key.

Before the park was designated, a series of significant events altered the islands. Formerly a series of disconnected barrier islands, between 1963 and 1965 the construction of the Bonita Beach Causeway connected the islands. The construction of the causeway has had significant impacts on the aquatic community and is cited as a major factor in the decline of water quality and seagrass in Estero Bay as a whole.

In 1968 a Miami-based developer named Floyd Luckey purchased Black Island and Inner Key for the "Sengra" corporation which he co-owned with the Graham family (now known as "The Graham Companies"). An environmental consultant in 1970 discussed concerns about a growing mosquito population on Black Island on account of the declining health of the island's mangroves. The developing company used this report to justify dredging much of the island to create an artificial canal to increase property values. The leftover fill from the dredging projects was used to increase the height of the remaining land area. In this process the island's vegetation was clearcut.

Black Island, which formerly had well developed Maritime Hammock and other coastal communities, has faced a series of significant disruptions to natural ecosystemic processes which has resulted in less biodiverse communities than exist on other islands nearby. Clearcutting and smothering the seedbank in the 70's followed by selective logging in the 80's have presented significant barriers to biodiversity, however despite lacking many species the island is definitely recovering.

== Ecology ==
The park is located upon a series of barrier islands and is primarily composed of Sand Dune, Coastal Strand, Maritime Hammock, and Mangrove Swamp communities.

== Gallery ==
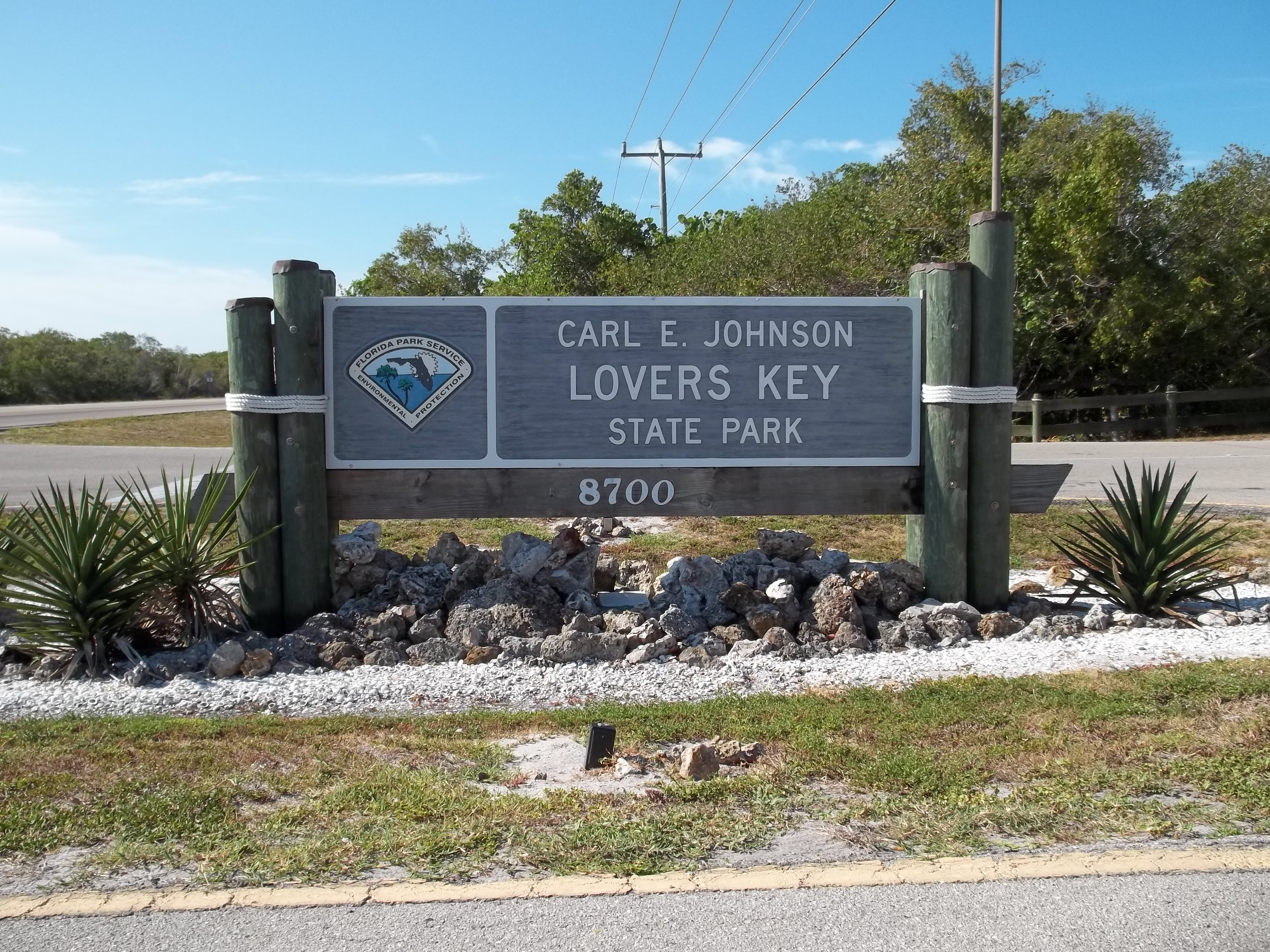
Entrance to the south side of park along the Bonita Beach Causeway

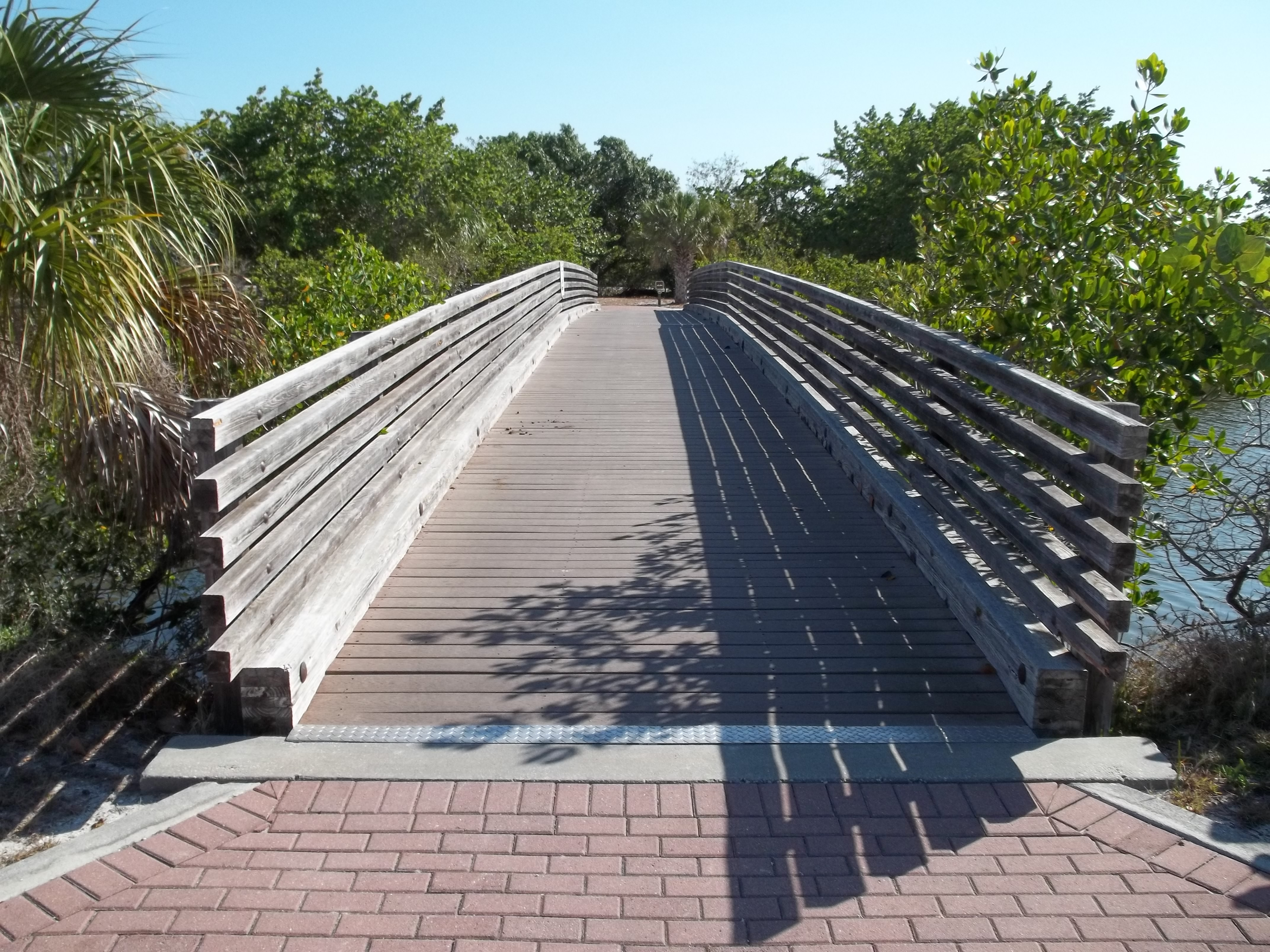
South side of park

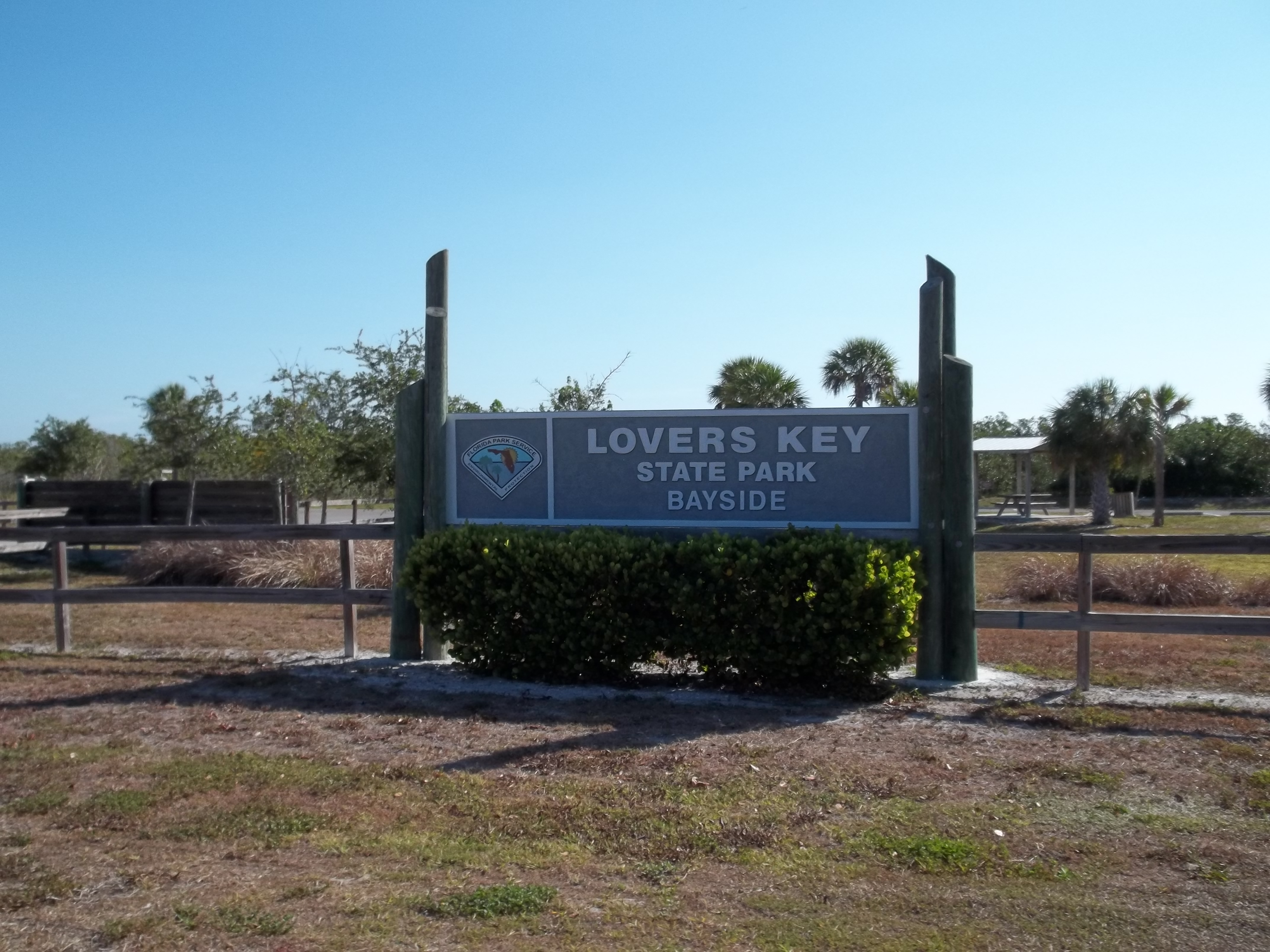
Bayside entrance

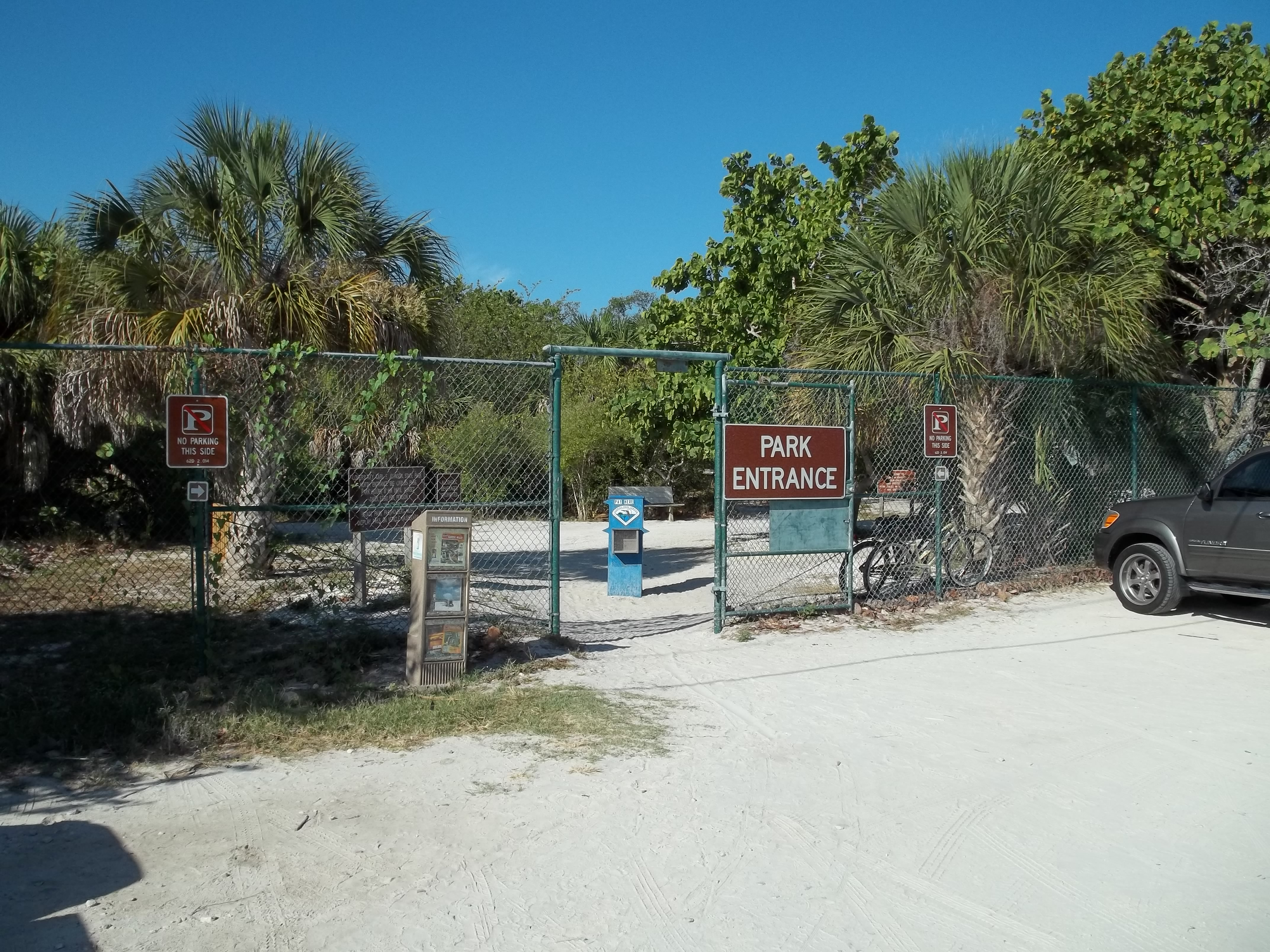
North side of park

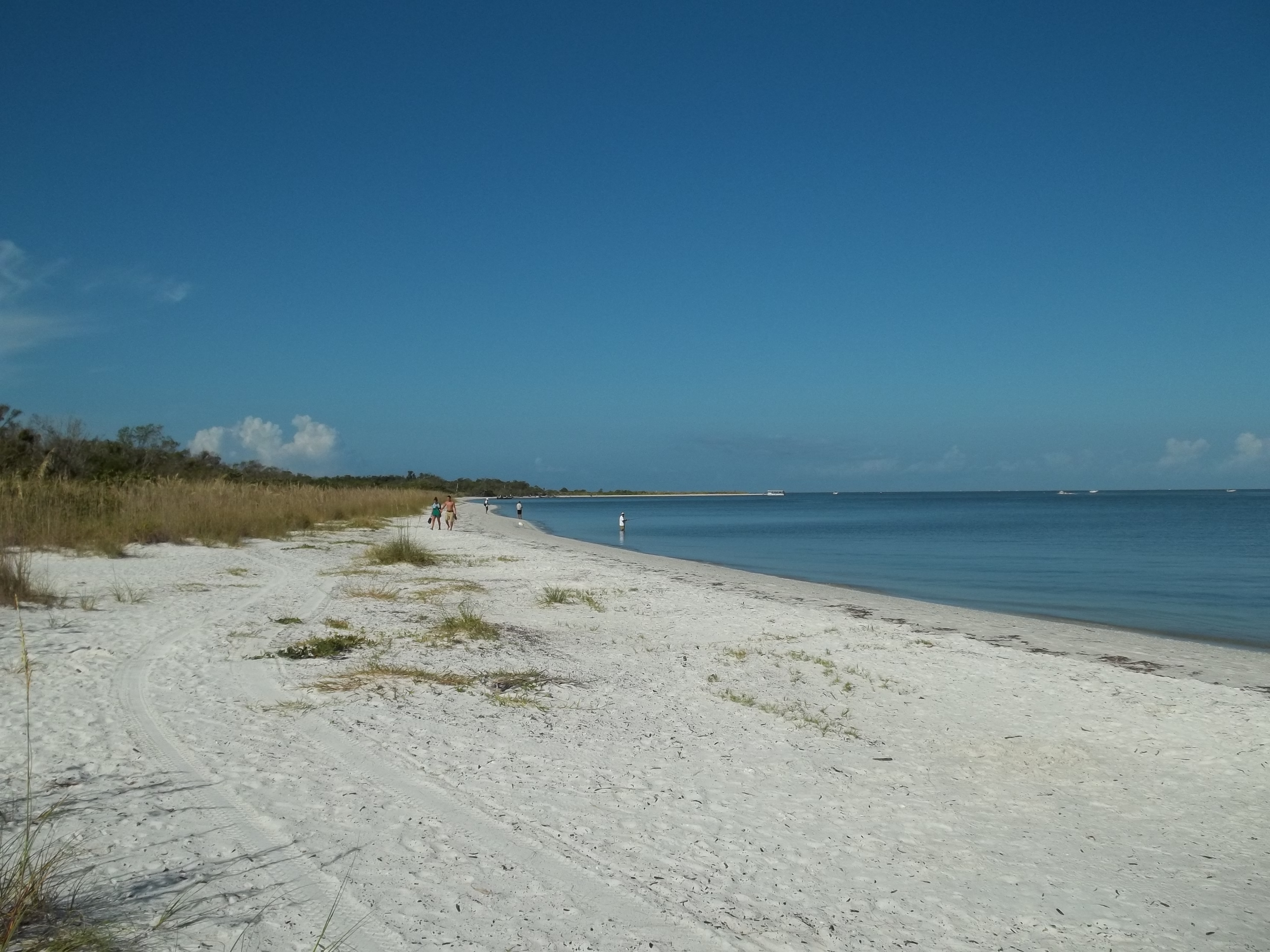
North side of park

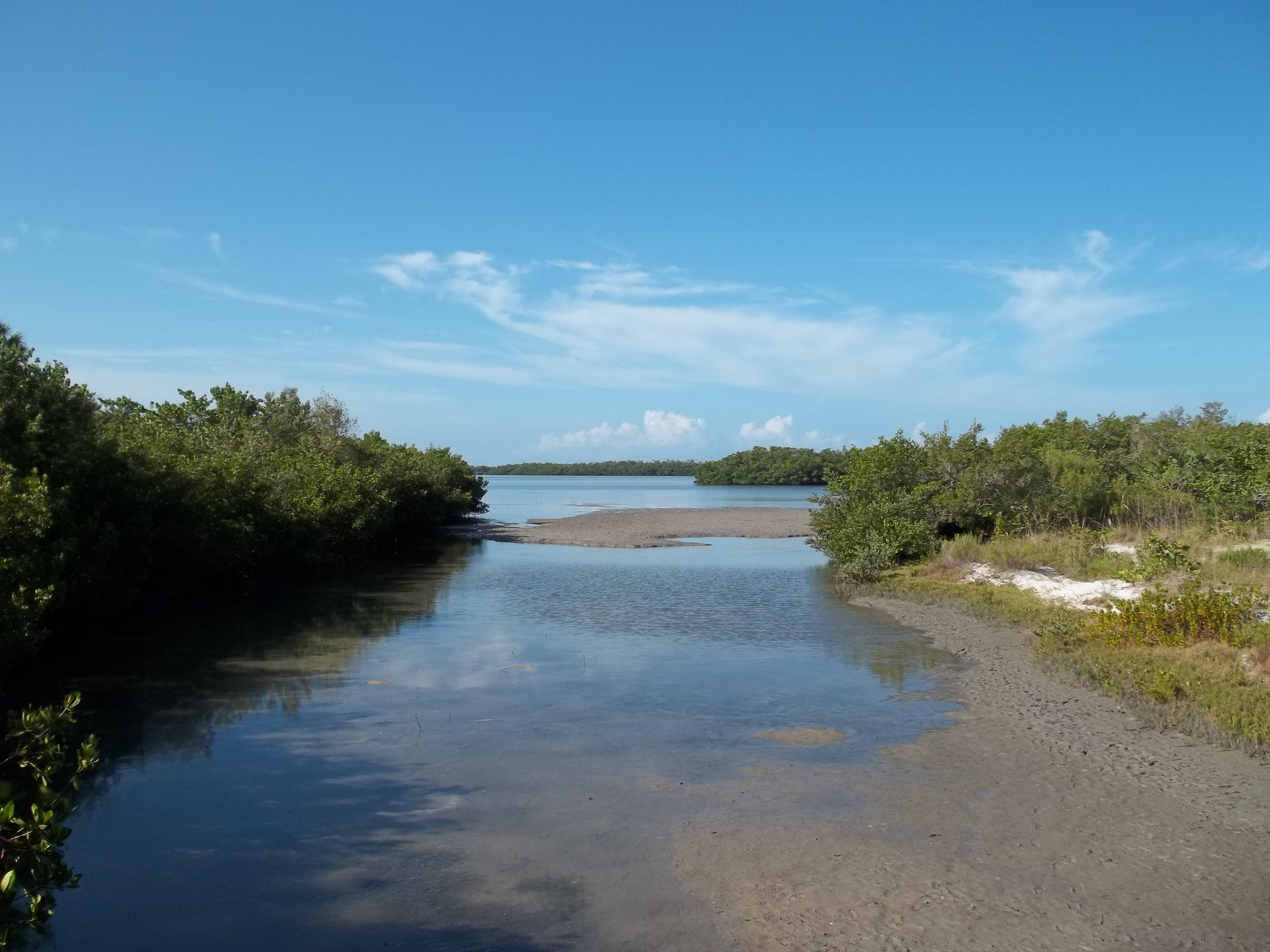
North side of park
