= Matanzas Pass Bridge =

Bridge in Florida, United States of America

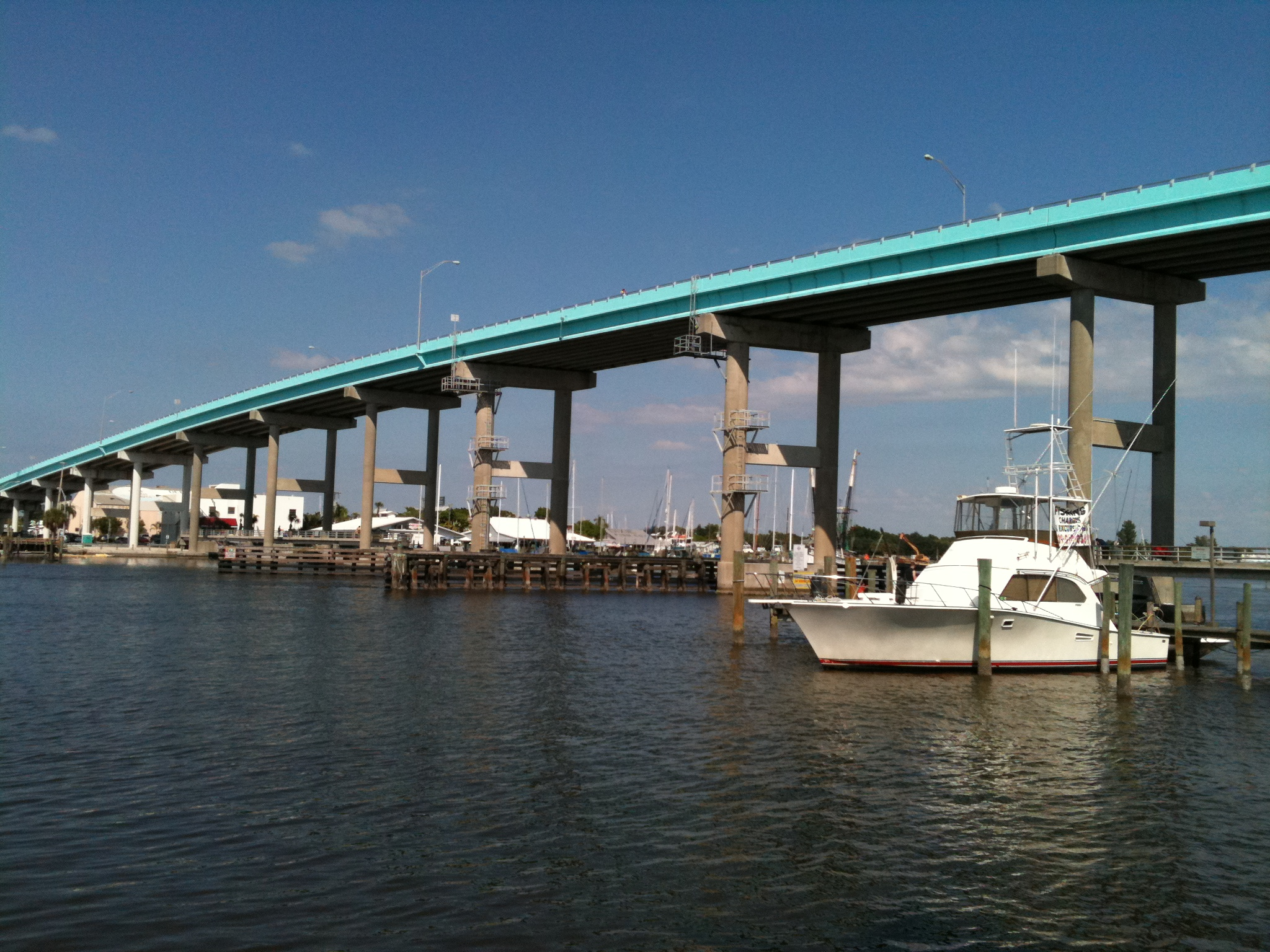
- Coordinates: 26°27′26.55″N 81°57′13.09″W
- Carries: SR 865 (San Carlos Boulevard)
- Crosses: Matanzas Pass
- Locale: Fort Myers Beach, Florida
- Official name: Matanzas Pass Bridge
- Maintained by: Florida Department of Transportation

Characteristics
- Design: Concrete Girder Bridge
- Clearance above: 65 Feet

History
- Opened: 1921 (original bridge); 1927 (swing bridge); October 15, 1979 (current bridge)

Statistics
- Toll: None

Location
- Interactive map of Matanzas Pass Bridge

The Matanzas Pass Bridge (also locally known as the Sky Bridge, or the Fort Myers Beach Bridge) is a bridge located in Fort Myers Beach, Florida. It carries State Road 865 (San Carlos Boulevard) between the Florida mainland (via San Carlos Island) and Estero Island, which is a major tourist destination. The bridge is one of the island's two connections to the mainland. The other is the Bonita Beach Causeway on the south end of the island.

The current Matanzas Pass Bridge opened in 1979, and is 65 feet (20 m) tall. It was the tallest bridge in Lee County when it was built, but it was surpassed in 2007 by Bridge A of the Sanibel Causeway, which is 70 feet (21 m) tall. The current bridge has two traffic lanes, one for northbound traffic and one for southbound traffic. There is also a pedestrian lane, which is separated from the rest of the bridge by a concrete barrier. Fishing piers also exist underneath the bridge on each side. The bridge's current blue color was added in 2011, making it resemble the Jewfish Creek Bridge in Key Largo.

The bridge was damaged but not destroyed by Hurricane Ian in 2022.

== History ==
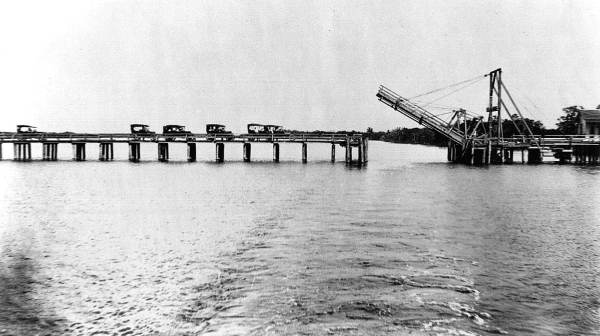
1921-1926 Wooden bridge

The original Matanzas Pass Bridge was a small wooden drawbridge built in 1921. The original bridge was built by Tom Phillips, an early developer of Fort Myers Beach. The original wooden bridge had a 54-cent toll. The original road connecting to the bridge on the main land ran northwest along the coast of San Carlos Bay to present-day Bunche Beach where it turned north to McGregor Boulevard. Portions of the original road that remain are now San Carlos Drive on San Carlos Island and John Morris Road north of Bunche Beach.

In 1924, Tom Phillips built a set of coquina stone arches on the north side of the bridge to serve as an entrance to his development known as San Carlos on the Gulf on what is now San Carlos Island (which was still part of the main land at the time).

In 1926, a major hurricane destroyed the original wooden bridge, only five years after it was built. This same hurricane also separated what is now San Carlos Island from the main land, making the original road impassible. The body of water created by the hurricane separating San Carlos Island from the mainland was appropriately named Hurricane Pass.

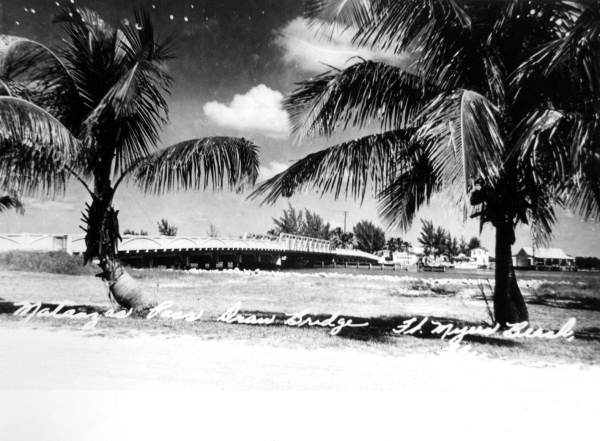
Swing bridge built in 1927

In 1927, a concrete swing bridge was installed to replace the original. A new road, known today as San Carlos Boulevard, was also constructed at this time as a more direct route to replace the original road. The new road and bridge were built just to the east of the previous bridge so it would align with Tom Phillip's arches so motorists would drive underneath them. The swing span on the concrete bridge was a recycled span that formerly operated in Broward County on the east coast.

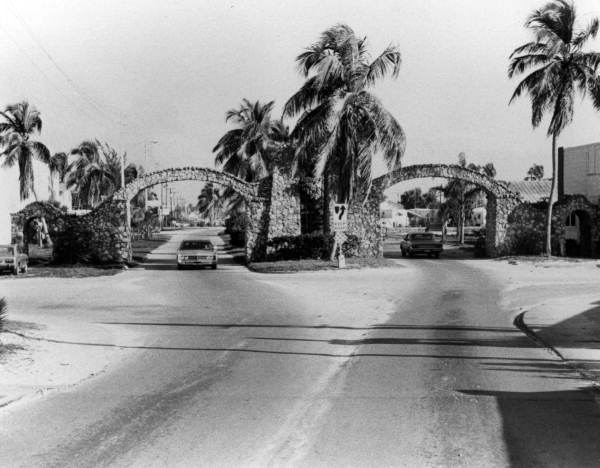
Historic coquina stone arches on the north side of the previous Matanzas Pass Bridge in 1977. The arches were demolished to make room for the current bridge.

Previously cranked opened by hand, an electric motor was installed on the bridge's swing span in 1950 due to the area's rapidly growing shrimping industry, which caused the span to be opened frequently. Despite being motorized, the bridge was old and unreliable, and island residents feared that the bridge would fail and strand them in the event of an emergency, such as a hurricane evacuation. This concern led to the construction of Bonita Beach Causeway at the southern end of the island in 1965.

The swing bridge's age and continued structural weakness led the state to ultimately replace the bridge in the late 1970s. Construction began on the current bridge in 1977 and it opened to traffic on October 15, 1979. The current bridge is a 65 foot tall fixed span to accommodate the area's large shrimping vessels without disrupting traffic. The current bridge was built one block east of the swing bridge to accommodate its height, and the old bridge's approach is now known as Old San Carlos Boulevard on the island side. The road linking Estero Boulevard to Old San Carlos Boulevard was subsequently closed to vehicular traffic and is now a pedestrian-only street known as Times Square. The coquina stone arches were demolished to make room for the new bridge.

== Gallery ==
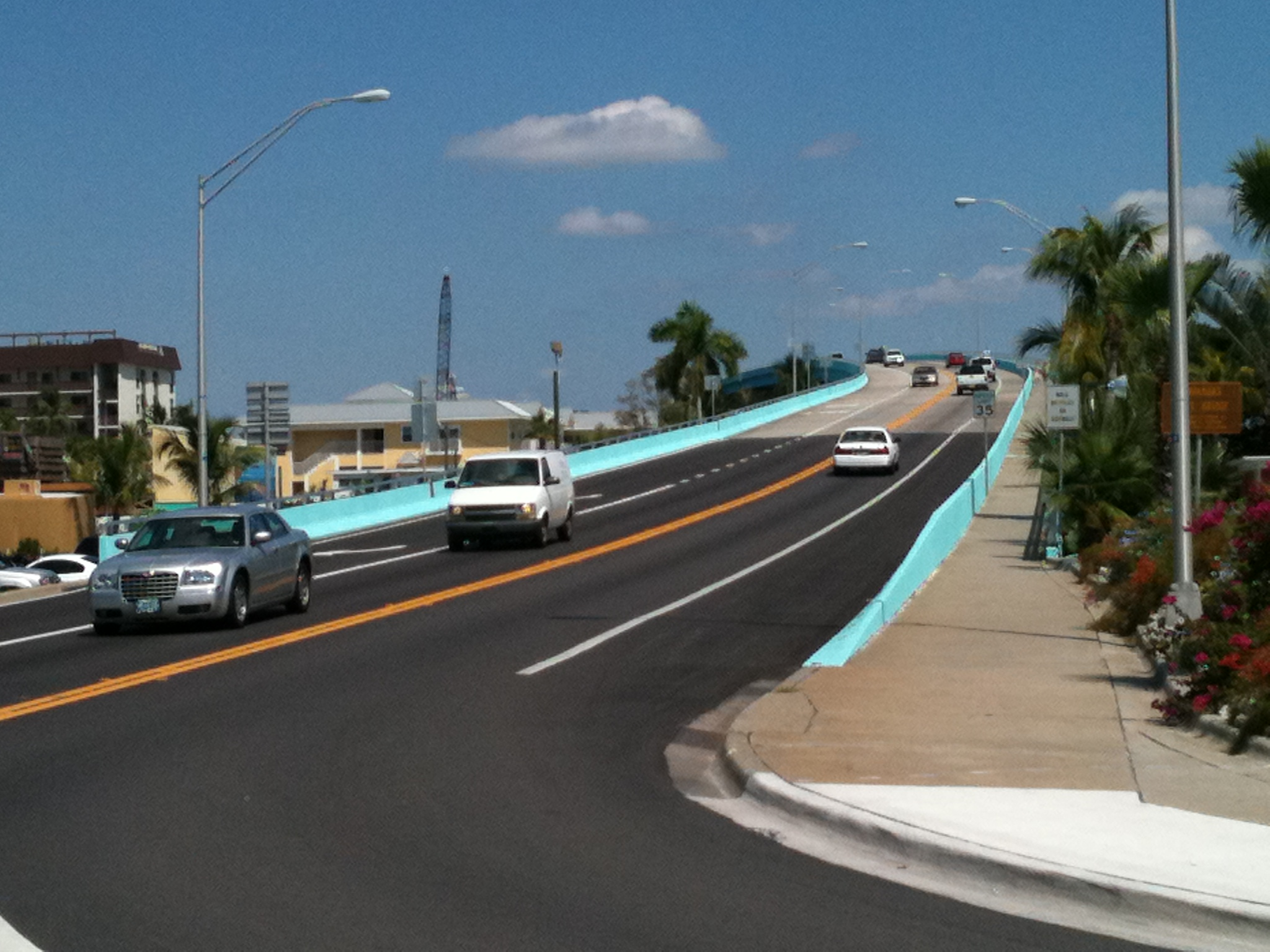
The foot of the Matanzas Pass Bridge on the island side

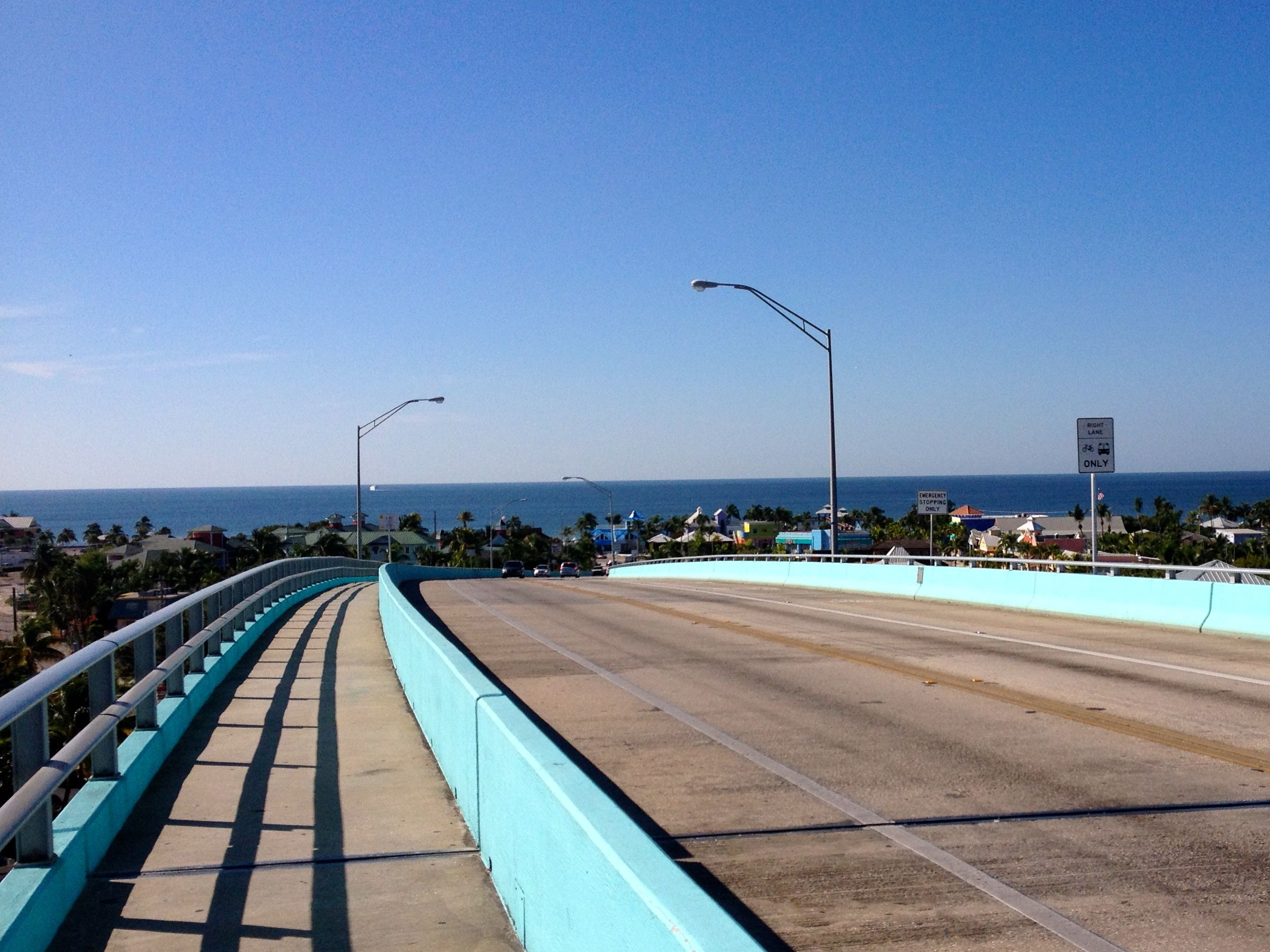
The view of the Gulf of Mexico from the top of the bridge

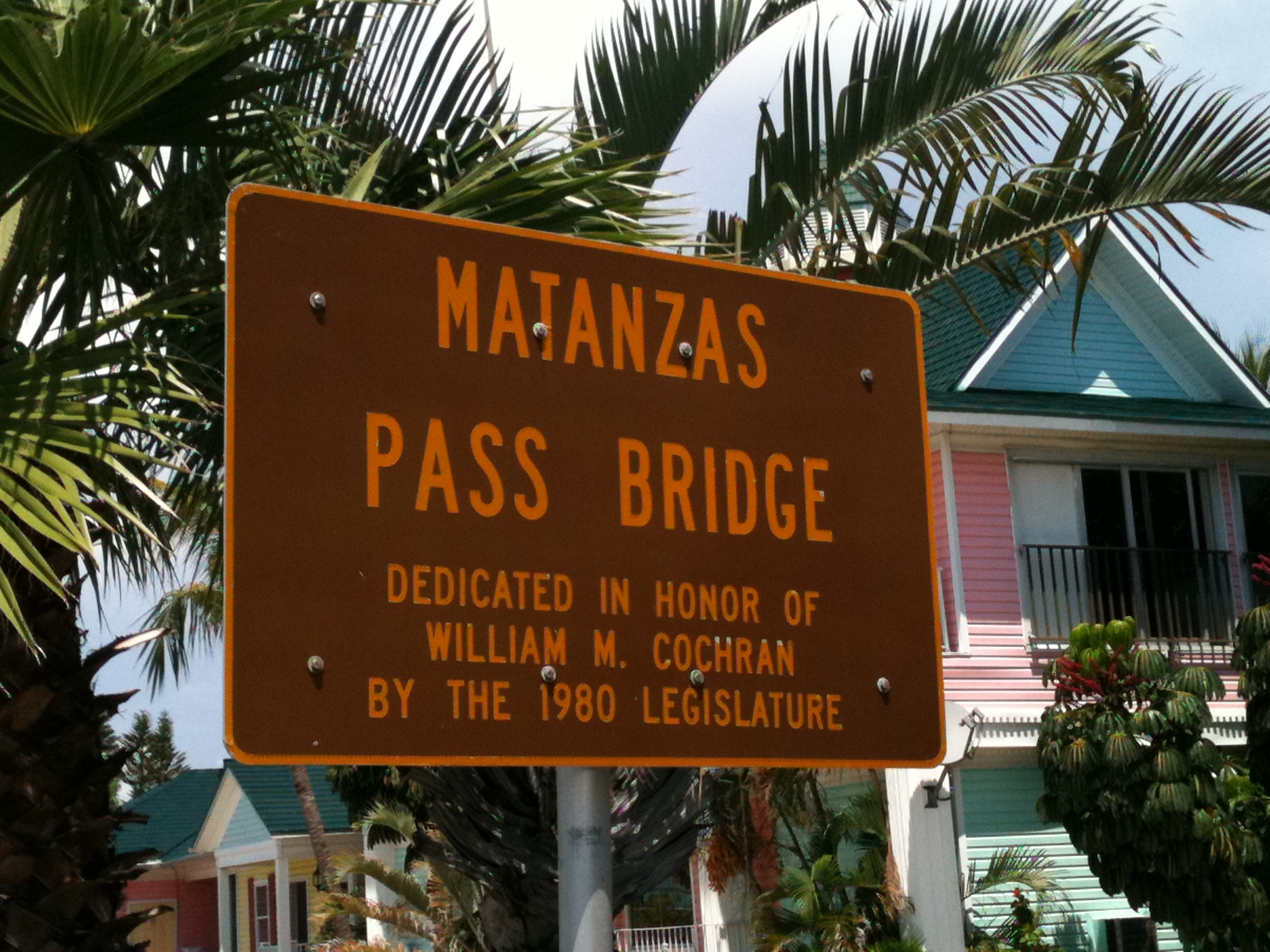
Dedication plaque

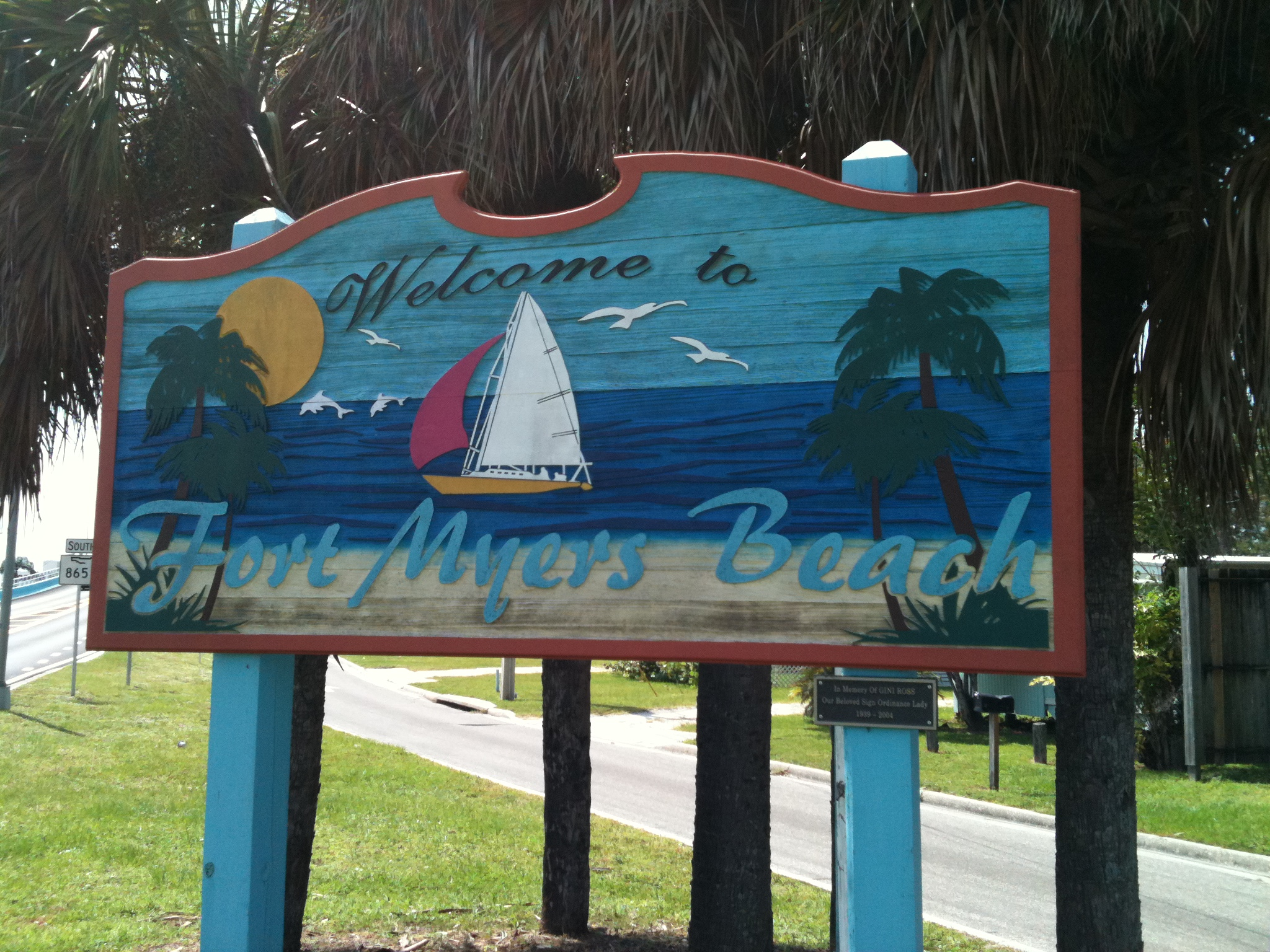
Welcome to Fort Myers Beach sign on the mainland (San Carlos Island) side

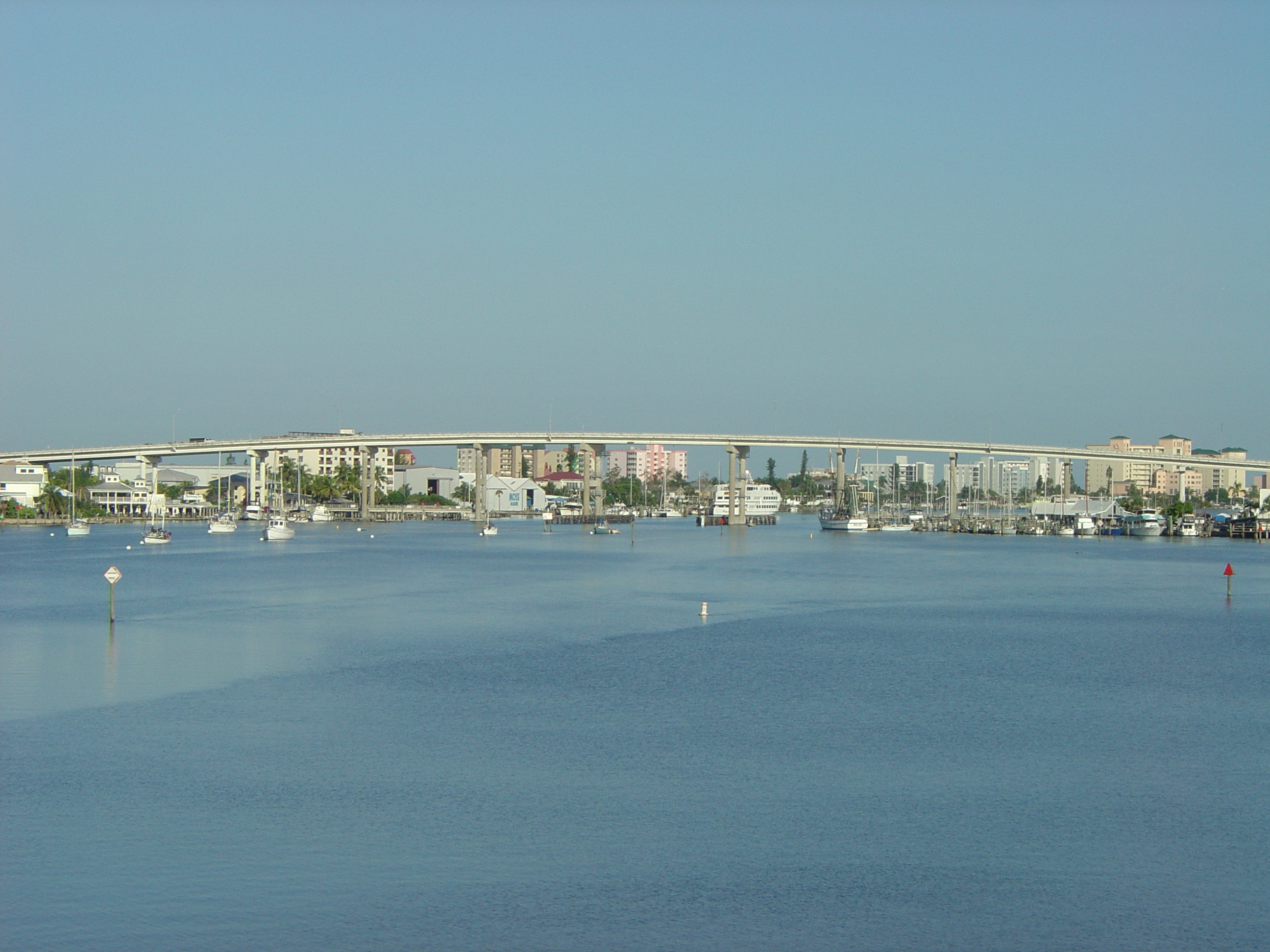
The bridge as it appeared prior to the addition of the blue color

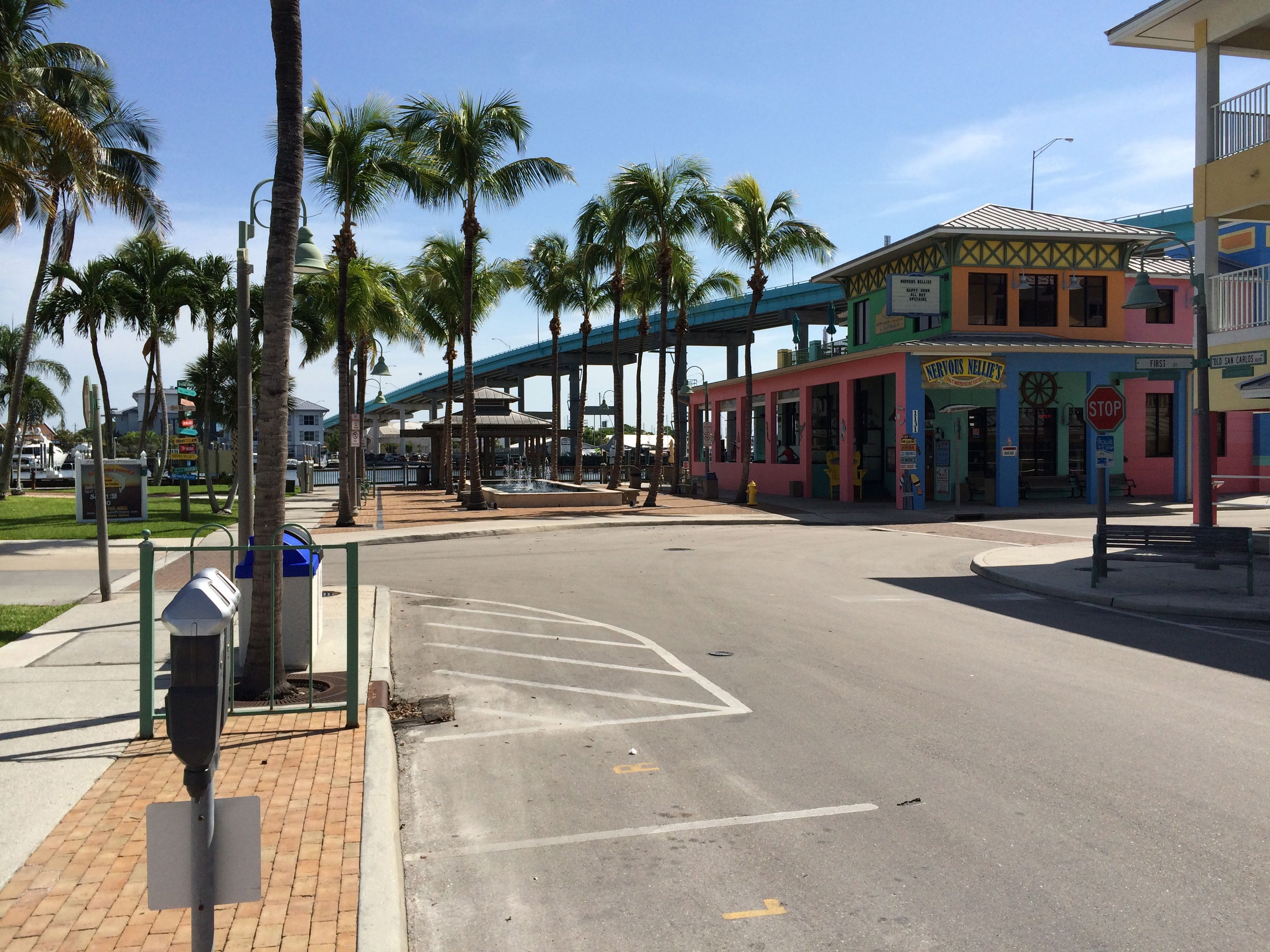
The former bridges were located at the end of Old San Carlos Boulevard, next to the current bridge
