= Six Mile Cypress Slough Preserve =

Coordinates: 26.575°N 81.822°W

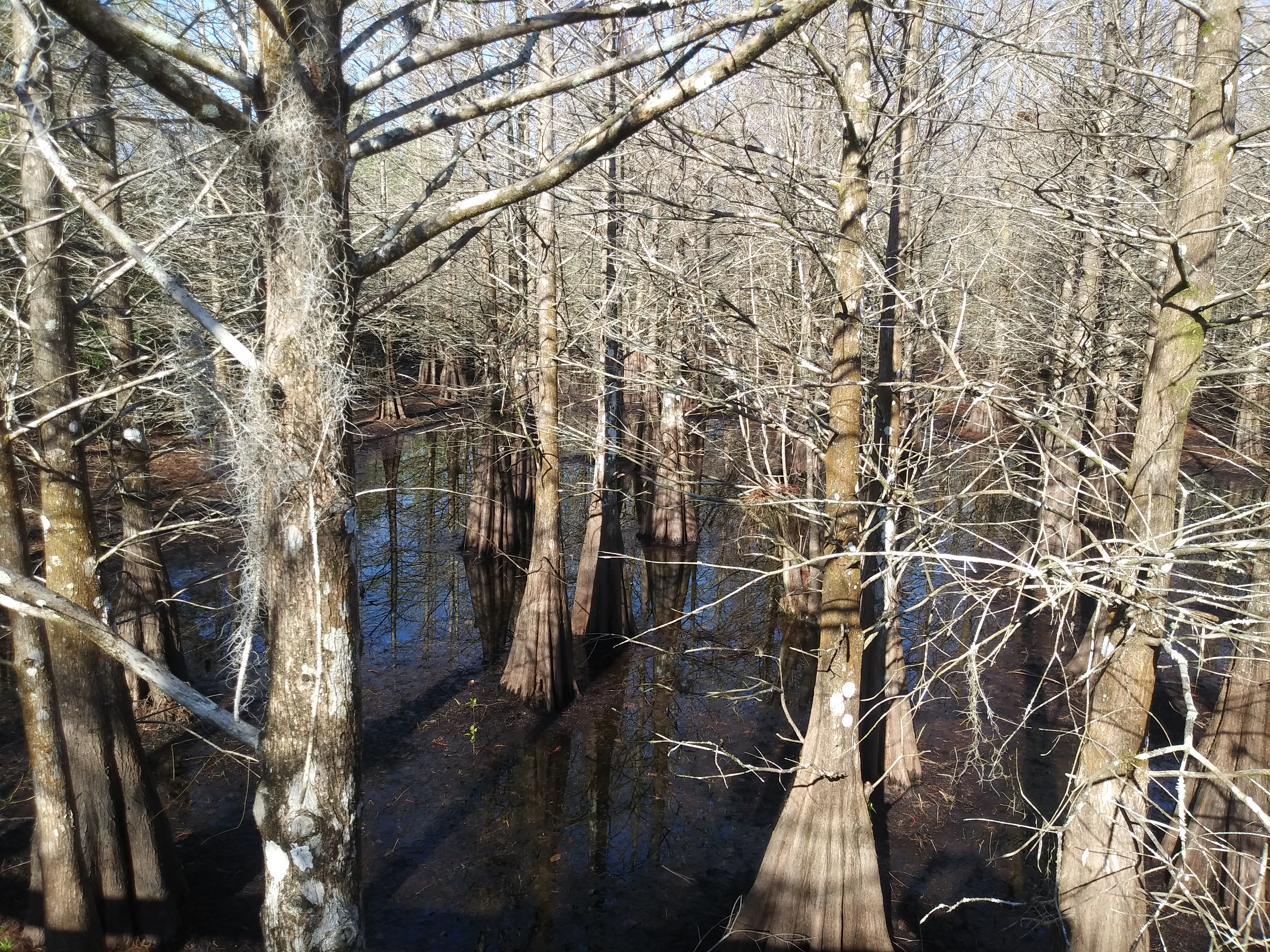
A stand of cypress trees in the preserve

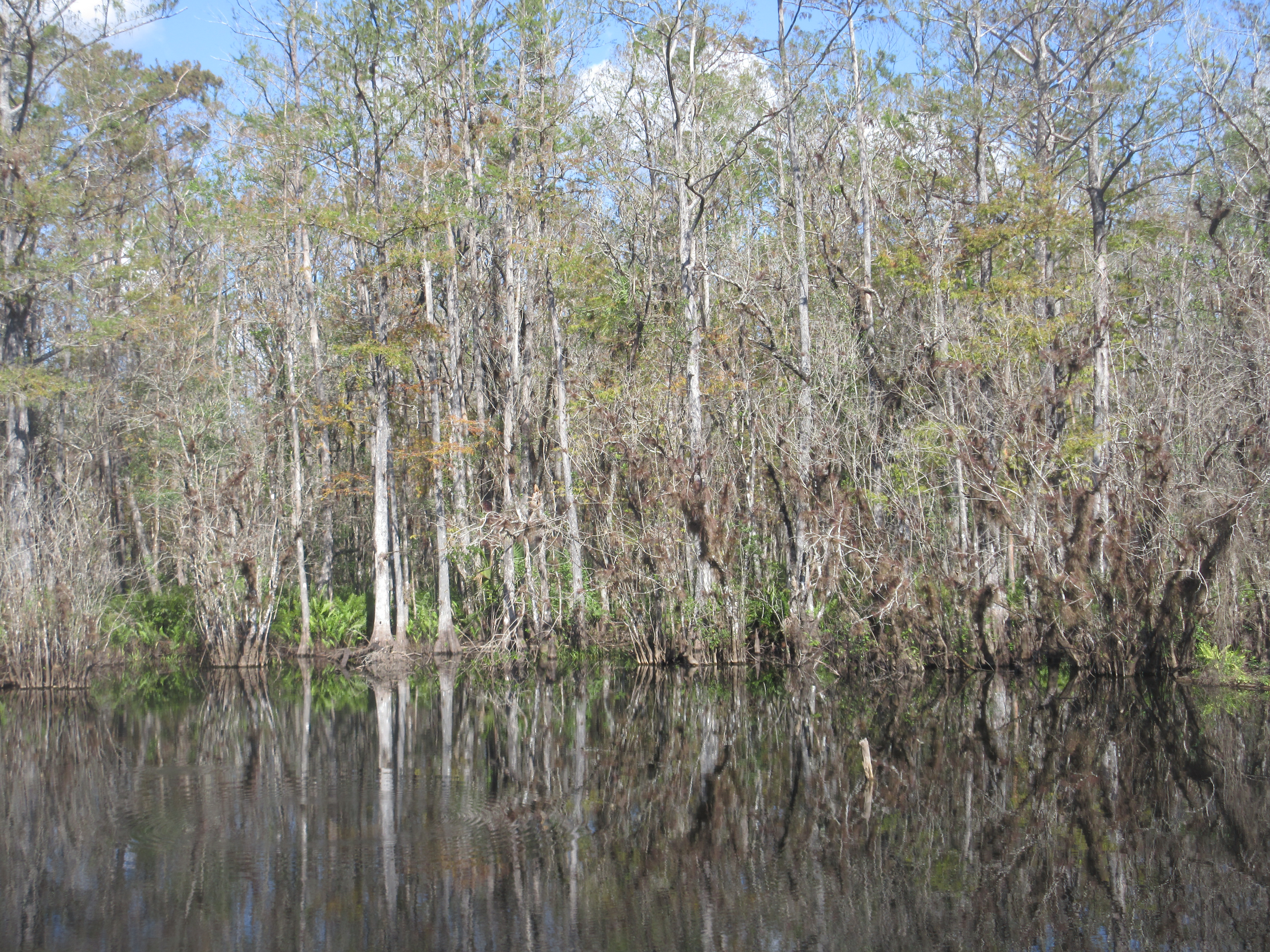
View from the boardwalk.

The Six Mile Cypress Slough Preserve is a 3,500 acre wetland, located in Fort Myers, Florida, which filters rainwater on its way towards Estero Bay. The preserve contains a 1.2-mile boardwalk trail, interpretive center, and amphitheater. The slough is a nine mile long, one-third of a mile wide, wildlife corridor, providing a safe way for animals to travel within the Fort Myers city limits. A 57-square-mile watershed drains into the slough.

The Six Mile Cypress Slough Preserve boardwalk hours are from dawn to dusk year-round. The Interpretive Center hours are from 10 a.m. to 4 p.m. Tuesday through Sunday.

The parking fee is $1 per hour per vehicle, maximum $5 for the day. Lee County Annual Parking Stickers are accepted at this location.

== History ==
The Monday Group, a Fort Myers high school environmental class, went door-to-door, petitioning that Lee County residents raise their own taxes to purchase and protect the slough as a preserve. As a result, the students gathered enough signatures for a referendum to be placed on the ballot in 1976.

== The Importance of Conservation ==
The wetlands at Six Mile Cypress are a vital part of the ecosystem, providing clean water and serving as a natural flood control system. The wetlands are also habitats for plants and animals, including many endangered species. In addition, the wetlands provide a home to many species of migratory birds and are a critical stop on the Atlantic Flyway. With development on the rise, wetlands are under increased pressure, and many are destroyed every year. The wetlands at Six Mile Cypress are protected by the Southwest Florida Water Management District, which works hard to protect and maintain the health of the wetlands. With more and more development happening in the area, the need for conservation is greater than ever.
