= Florida's 19th congressional district =

U.S. House district for Florida

Coordinates: 26°25′54″N 81°54′24″W

- Map of district boundaries
- Representative: Byron Donalds; R–Naples
- Area: 1,367 mi^{2} (3,540 km^{2})
- Distribution: 96.3% urban; 3.7% rural
- Population (2025): 839,433
- Median household income: $93,888
- Ethnicity: 69.7% White; 19.1% Hispanic; 5.9% Black; 2.9% Two or more races; 1.8% Asian; 0.7% other
- Cook PVI: R+14

Florida's 19th congressional district is a U.S. congressional district in Southwest Florida. It includes the cities of Cape Coral, Fort Myers, Fort Myers Beach, Sanibel, Bonita Springs, Naples and Marco Island, as well as unincorporated areas in Lee and Collier counties. It has been represented by Republican Byron Donalds since 2021.

The 19th district was created as a result of the redistricting cycle after the 1980 census. From then until 1993, it was a Miami-based district; much of its territory is now the 25th district. From 1993 to 2013, it covered parts of Fort Lauderdale and West Palm Beach; this area is now the 23rd district. The current 19th covers most of the territory that was the 14th district from 1993 to 2013.

== Recent election results from statewide races ==
Year	Office	Results
2008	President	McCain 57% - 42%
2010	Senate	Rubio 59% - 9%
2010	Governor	Scott 64% - 36%
2010	Attorney General	Bondi 65% - 28%
2010	Chief Financial Officer	Atwater 65% - 25%
2012	President	Romney 62% - 38%
2012	Senate	Mack IV 57% - 43%
2014	Governor	Scott 64% - 36%
2016	President	Trump 60% - 37%
2016	Senate	Rubio 66% - 31%
2018	Senate	Scott 62% - 38%
2018	Governor	DeSantis 62% - 37%
2018	Attorney General	Moody 65% - 34%
2018	Chief Financial Officer	Patronis 63% - 37%
2020	President	Trump 60% - 39%
2022	Senate	Rubio 68% - 31%
2022	Governor	DeSantis 69% - 30%
2022	Attorney General	Moody 70% - 30%
2022	Chief Financial Officer	Patronis 69% - 31%
2024	President	Trump 64% - 35%
2024	Senate	Scott 67% - 32%

== Composition ==
For the 118th and successive Congresses (based on redistricting following the 2020 census), the district contains all or portions of the following counties and communities:

Collier County (7)

Goodland, Marco Island, Naples, Naples Park, Pelican Bay, Pelican Marsh, Pine Ridge

Lee County (30)

Bokeelia, Bonita Springs, Burnt Store Marina, Cape Coral, Captiva, Cypress Lake, Estero, Florida Gulf Coast University, Fort Myers, Fort Myers Beach, Gateway, Harlem Heights, Iona, Lehigh Acres (part; also 17th), Lochmoor Waterway Estates, Matlacha, Matlacha Isles-Matlacha Shores, McGregor, North Fort Myers (part; also 17th), Page Park, Pine Island Center, Pineland, Pine Manor, Punta Rassa, St. James City, San Carlos Park, Sanibel, Three Oaks, Villas, Whiskey Creek

== List of members representing the district ==
Member	Party	Years	Cong ress	Electoral history	District location
District created January 3, 1983
Dante Fascell (Miami)	Democratic	January 3, 1983 – January 3, 1993	98th 99th 100th 101st 102nd	Redistricted from the 15th district and re-elected in 1982. Re-elected in 1984. Re-elected in 1986. Re-elected in 1988. Re-elected in 1990. Retired.	1983–1993 [data missing]
Harry Johnston (Boynton Beach)	Democratic	January 3, 1993 – January 3, 1997	103rd 104th	Redistricted from the 14th district and re-elected in 1992. Re-elected in 1994. Retired.	1993–2003 [data missing]
Robert Wexler (Boca Raton)	Democratic	January 3, 1997 – January 3, 2010	105th 106th 107th 108th 109th 110th 111th	Elected in 1996. Re-elected in 1998. Re-elected in 2000. Re-elected in 2002. Re-elected in 2004. Re-elected in 2006. Re-elected in 2008. Resigned to become president of the Center for Middle East Peace and Economic Cooperation.	1993–2003 [data missing]
Robert Wexler (Boca Raton)	Democratic	January 3, 1997 – January 3, 2010	105th 106th 107th 108th 109th 110th 111th	Elected in 1996. Re-elected in 1998. Re-elected in 2000. Re-elected in 2002. Re-elected in 2004. Re-elected in 2006. Re-elected in 2008. Resigned to become president of the Center for Middle East Peace and Economic Cooperation.	2003–2013; Based in South Florida. Parts of Palm Beach County and Broward County, including the cities of Coral Springs, Margate and Greenacres.
Vacant		January 3, 2010 – April 13, 2010	111th		2003–2013; Based in South Florida. Parts of Palm Beach County and Broward County, including the cities of Coral Springs, Margate and Greenacres.
Ted Deutch (Boca Raton)	Democratic	April 13, 2010 – January 3, 2013	111th 112th	Elected to finish Wexler's term. Re-elected later in 2010. Redistricted to the 21st district.	2003–2013; Based in South Florida. Parts of Palm Beach County and Broward County, including the cities of Coral Springs, Margate and Greenacres.
Trey Radel (Fort Myers)	Republican	January 3, 2013 – January 27, 2014	113th	Elected in 2012. Resigned.	2013–2023; Located in Southwest Florida. Including Cape Coral, Fort Myers, Naples and Marco Island.
Vacant		January 27, 2014 – June 25, 2014	113th		2013–2023; Located in Southwest Florida. Including Cape Coral, Fort Myers, Naples and Marco Island.
Curt Clawson (Bonita Springs)	Republican	June 25, 2014 – January 3, 2017	113th 114th	Elected to finish Radel's term. Re-elected later in 2014. Retired.	2013–2023; Located in Southwest Florida. Including Cape Coral, Fort Myers, Naples and Marco Island.
Francis Rooney (Naples)	Republican	January 3, 2017 – January 3, 2021	115th 116th	Elected in 2016. Re-elected in 2018. Retired.	2013–2023; Located in Southwest Florida. Including Cape Coral, Fort Myers, Naples and Marco Island.
Byron Donalds (Naples)	Republican	January 3, 2021 – present	117th 118th 119th	Elected in 2020. Re-elected in 2022. Re-elected in 2024. Retired to run for Governor of Florida.	2013–2023; Located in Southwest Florida. Including Cape Coral, Fort Myers, Naples and Marco Island.
Byron Donalds (Naples)	Republican	January 3, 2021 – present	117th 118th 119th	Elected in 2020. Re-elected in 2022. Re-elected in 2024. Retired to run for Governor of Florida.	2023–2027
Jim Schwartzel (Fort Myers)	Republican	Assuming office on January 3, 2027		Elected in 2026.	2023–2027

== Election results ==
=== 2002 ===
2002 United States House of Representatives elections in Florida: District 19
Party	Candidate	Votes	%
Democratic	Robert Wexler (Incumbent)	156,747	72.16%
Republican	Jack Merkle	60,477	27.84%
Majority		96,720	44.32%
Turnout		217,224	
Democratic hold			

=== 2004 ===
2004 United States House of Representatives elections in Florida: District 19
Party	Candidate	Votes	%	±%
Democratic	Robert Wexler (Incumbent)	202,345	100%	+27.84%
Majority		202,345	100%	+55.68%
Turnout		202,345		−6.85%
Democratic hold		Swing	[?]	

=== 2006 ===
2006 United States House of Representatives elections in Florida: District 19
Party	Candidate	Votes	%	±%
Democratic	Robert Wexler (Incumbent)	178,456	100%	
Majority		178,456	100%	
Turnout		178,456		−11.8%
Democratic hold		Swing	[?]	

=== 2008 ===
2008 United States House of Representatives elections in Florida: District 19
Party	Candidate	Votes	%	±%
Democratic	Robert Wexler (Incumbent)	202,465	66.16%	−33.84%
Republican	Edward Lynch	83,357	27.24%	+27.24%
Independent	Benjamin Graber	20,214	6.61%	+6.61%
Majority		119,108	38.92%	−61.08%
Turnout		306,036		+71.49%
Democratic hold		Swing	[?]	

=== 2010 (Special) ===
2010 Florida's 19th congressional district special election
Party	Candidate	Votes	%	±%
Democratic	Ted Deutch	43,269	62.06%	−4.10%
Republican	Edward Lynch	24,549	35.21%	+7.97%
Independent	Jim McCormick	1,905	2.73%	+2.73%
Majority		18,720	26.85%	−12.07%
Turnout		69,723		−77.22%
Democratic hold		Swing	[?]	

=== 2010 ===
2010 United States House of Representatives elections in Florida: District 19
Party	Candidate	Votes	%	±%
Democratic	Ted Deutch (Incumbent)	132,098	62.59%	+0.53%
Republican	Joe Budd	78,733	37.30%	+2.09%
Write-In	Others	228	0.11%	+0.11%
Majority		53,365	25.29%	−1.56%
Turnout		211,059		+202.71%
Democratic hold		Swing	[?]	

=== 2012 ===
Florida 19th Congressional District 2012
Party	Candidate	Votes	%
Republican	Trey Radel	189,833	62.0%
Democratic	Jim Roach	109,746	35.8%
No Party Affiliation	Brandon M. Smith	6,637	2.2%
Total votes		306,216	
Turnout			
Republican gain from Democratic			

=== 2014 (Special) ===
Florida's 19th Congressional District special election, 2014
Party	Candidate	Votes	%
Republican	Curt Clawson	66,922	66.9%
Democratic	April Freeman	29,314	29.3%
Libertarian	Ray Netherwood	3,729	3.7%
Write-In	Timothy J. Rossano	24	0.0%
Total votes		99,989	
Republican hold			

=== 2014 ===
Florida's 19th Congressional District Election (2014)
Party	Candidate	Votes	%
Republican	Curt Clawson (Incumbent)	159,354	64.6%
Democratic	April Freeman	80,824	32.7%
Libertarian	Ray Netherwood	6,671	2.7%
Write-In	Timothy J. Rossano	12	0.0%
Total votes		246,861	
Turnout			
Republican hold			

=== 2016 ===
Florida's 19th Congressional District Election (2016)
Party	Candidate	Votes	%
Republican	Francis Rooney	239,225	65.9%
Democratic	Robert M. Neeld	123,812	34.1%
Write-In	David Byron	109	0%
Write-In	Timothy John Rossano	20	0%
Total votes		363,166	
Republican hold			

=== 2018 ===
2018 United States House of Representatives elections in Florida
Party	Candidate	Votes	%
Republican	Francis Rooney (incumbent)	211,465	62.3%
Democratic	David Holden	128,106	37.7%
Independent	Pete Pollard (write-in)	36	0.0%
Total votes		339,607	100.0%
Republican hold			

=== 2020 ===
2020 United States House of Representatives elections in Florida
Party	Candidate	Votes	%
Republican	Byron Donalds	272,440	61.27%
Democratic	Cindy Banyai	172,146	38.72%
Independent	Patrick Post (write-in)	3	0.01%
Total votes		444,589	100.0%
Republican hold			

=== 2022 ===
2022 United States House of Representatives elections in Florida
Party	Candidate	Votes	%
Republican	Byron Donalds (incumbent)	213,035	68.01%
Democratic	Cindy Banyai	100,226	31.99%
Independent	Patrick Post (write-in)	13	0%
Total votes		313,274	100.0%
Republican hold			

=== 2024 ===
2024 United States House of Representatives elections in Florida
Party	Candidate	Votes	%
Republican	Byron Donalds (incumbent)	275,708	66.32%
Democratic	Kari Lerner	140,038	33.68%
Total votes		415,746	100.0%
Republican hold			
