= List of county roads in Lee County, Florida =

- Standard route marker for county routes in Lee County

Highway names
- Interstates: Interstate X (I-X)
- US Highways: U.S. Route X (US X)
- State: State Road X (NY X)
- County: County Road X (CR X)

System links
- County roads in Florida

The following is a list of county roads in Lee County, Florida, United States. As with most Florida counties, numbers are assigned in a statewide grid. Many roads are former state roads that have been truncated or eliminated. County roads are maintained by the Lee County Department of Transportation (Lee County DOT).

== County Road 78 ==
County Road 78
- Location: Pine Island Center–Cape Coral and North Fort Myers–Alva
- Length: 19 mi (31 km)
- Existed: 1980–present

County Road 78 exists in two sections that were both formerly State Road 78. The western section runs along Pine Island Road from SR 78 / CR 765 / CR 884 in Cape Coral to CR 767 in Pine Island Center, and the eastern section runs along North River Road from SR 31 in North Fort Myers to the Hendry County line in Alva, continuing east into Hendry County.

== County Road 78A ==
County Road 78A
- Location: Cape Coral–North Fort Myers
- Length: 3.6 mi (5.8 km)
- Existed: 1980–present

County Road 78A is Pondella Road from SR 78 in Cape Coral to U.S. Route 41 Business in North Fort Myers. It provides a quicker way for motorists traveling east on SR 78 to access Downtown Fort Myers. The road was known as SR 78A before 1980.

== County Road 765 ==
County Road 765
- Location: Cape Coral–Burnt Store Marina
- Length: 9.2 mi (14.8 km)

County Road 765 is Burnt Store Road in northwest Cape Coral.

=== Route description ===
Burnt Store Road begins in northwest Cape Coral at an intersection with Pine Island Road (SR 78/CR 78) and Veterans Parkway (CR 884). From here, it heads north as a four-lane divided roadway with a wide median. After its intersection with Van Buren Parkway, Burnt Store Road is reduced to a two-lane divided road and it continues north. It passes the community of Burnt Store Marina before crossing into Charlotte County, where it continues north to Punta Gorda.

=== History ===
The road is named after the community of Burnt Store Marina, whose name refers to a general store and trading post operated by early settlers that once stood in the general vicinity. The trading post was burned down by a small group of Seminole Indians led by Chief Billy Bowlegs in protest of settlers taking their land.

Burnt Store Road was designated as part of SR 183 when it was added to the state highway system. After the 1945 Florida state road renumbering, the road became SR 765. It later became CR 765 when it was relinquished to county control in the 1980s.

Much of Burnt Store Road was moved to its current alignment in the early 1960s. The original alignment, which is now Old Burnt Store Road, was located a mile to the west.

The southern section of Burnt Store Road was widened to four lanes in the late 2010s and early 2020s.

=== Major intersections ===
Location	mi	km	Destinations	Notes
Cape Coral	0.00	0.00	SR 78 east / CR 78 west (Pine Island Road) / CR 884 east (Veterans Parkway)	Western terminus of CR 884
Burnt Store Marina	9.20	14.81	CR 765 north (Burnt Store Road)	Continuation into Charlotte County
1.000 mi = 1.609 km; 1.000 km = 0.621 mi

== County Road 767 ==
County Road 767
- Location: St. James City–Bokeelia
- Length: 14.6 mi (23.5 km)

County Road 767, also known as Stringfellow Road, is the main north–south road running the length of Pine Island.

=== Route description ===
Stringfellow Road begins in St. James City, the unincorporated community on the south end of Pine Island. From St. James City, it runs north along the length of Pine Island. At Pine Island Center, Stringfellow Road intersects with Pine Island Road (CR 78), which runs east to the main land over the Pine Island Causeway. Continuing north, Stringfellow Road passes Pineland before coming to its north terminus in Bokeelia, the community on the north end of Pine Island.

=== History ===
Stringfellow Road is named for Harry Stringfellow, a Lee County commissioner from Pine Island who served from 1926 to 1953. Before Pine Island was connected to the main land, Commissioner Stringfellow would have to travel from his home in Pineland via a mule-drawn wagon to St. James City to catch a steamboat to Fort Myers for county commission meetings. This process would often take all day one-way, meaning that Stringfellow was away from home for county commission meeting for days at a time. It was for this reason he championed the construction of the Pine Island Causeway to improve transportation to and on Pine Island.

The road was added to the state highway system in 1931 with the designation of SR 183. The designation became SR 767 during the 1945 Florida state road renumbering. SR 767 was later relinquished to county control in the 1980s.

=== Major intersections ===
Location	mi	km	Destinations	Notes
St. James City	0.00	0.00	York Road	Southern terminus of county maintenance
Pine Island Center	7.50	12.07	CR 78 east (Pine Island Road)	Western terminus of CR 78; former SR 78
Bokeelia	14.60	23.50	Main Street	Northern terminus at northern tip of Pine Island
1.000 mi = 1.609 km; 1.000 km = 0.621 mi

== County Road 771 ==
Unsigned CR 771, formerly part of SR 771, is Gasparilla Road extending north from Boca Grande to the Charlotte County line on Gasparilla Island.

== County Road 810 ==
County Road 810
- Location: Fort Myers–near Buckingham
- Length: 1.2 mi (1.9 km)

County Road 810 exists along Luckett Road from CR 865 (Ortiz Avenue) in Fort Myers to Country Lakes Drive west of Buckingham.

The road is maintained by the Lee County DOT, except for the interchange with I-75, which is maintained by Florida DOT.

=== Major intersections ===
Location	mi	km	Destinations	Notes
Fort Myers	0.00	0.00	CR 865 (Ortiz Avenue) to SR 80 / SR 82	
	0.80	1.29	I-75 – Tampa, Naples	Exit 139 on I-75
	1.20	1.93	Country Lakes Drive / Luckett Road east	
1.000 mi = 1.609 km; 1.000 km = 0.621 mi

== County Road 840 ==
County Road 840
- Location: near San Carlos Park–near Estero
- Length: 11.1 mi (17.9 km)

County Road 840 is Alico Road from US 41 (Tamiami Trail) just west of San Carlos Park to CR 850 (Corkscrew Road) east of Estero.

== County Road 850 ==
County Road 850
- Location: Estero–near Immokalee
- Length: 15.8 mi (25.4 km)

County Road 850 is Corkscrew Road from US 41 (Tamiami Trail) in Estero to the Collier County line near Immokalee, where it continues east into Collier County towards Immokalee.

== County Road 863 ==
County Road 863
- Location: Fort Myers
- Length: 1.8 mi (2.9 km)

County Road 863 is the county-controlled segment of Fowler Street south of Hanson Street within the city limits of Fort Myers. North of Hanson Street, Fowler is state-controlled and is part of State Road 739.

== County Road 865 ==
County Road 865
- Location: Bonita Springs–Fort Myers Beach, Iona–Tice
- Length: 35.9 mi (57.8 km)

County Road 865 exists in three sections. The southernmost section runs along Bonita Beach Road through Bonita Springs, Hickory Boulevard though Bonita Beach, and Estero Boulevard though Fort Myers Beach. The central section travels along Gladiolus Drive through Iona, Harlem Heights, and Biggar before ending at US 41 (Tamiami Trail). The northern section runs along Ben C. Pratt Six Mile Cypress Parkway and Ortiz Avenue from SR 739 to SR 80 in Tice. The segments were once part of a continuous SR 865.

== County Road 867 ==
County Road 867
- Location: Punta Rassa–Iona
- Length: 4.8 mi (7.7 km)

County Road 867 is McGregor Boulevard from the Sanibel Causeway in Punta Rassa to SR 867 in Iona.

The road was formerly known as SR 867, a designation which still exists on a section of McGregor Boulevard from Iona to McGregor.

== County Road 867A ==
County Road 867A
- Location: McGregor–Cape Coral and North Fort Myers
- Length: 12.8 mi (20.6 km)

County Road 867A begins at McGregor Boulevard (SR 867) and crosses the Cape Coral Bridge into Cape Coral where it briefly runs along Cape Coral Parkway. It then runs north along Del Prado Boulevard though Cape Coral and North Fort Myers.

== County Road 869 ==
County Road 869
- Location: Iona–Fort Myers
- Length: 11.7 mi (18.8 km)

County Road 869 is the designation for Summerlin Road which runs from just east of Punta Rassa to Fort Myers.

== County Road 876 ==
County Road 876
- Location: McGregor–Fort Myers Shores
- Length: 23.0 mi (37.0 km)

County Road 876 runs along Cypress Lake Drive and Daniels Parkway just south of Fort Myers. It then runs along Gunnery Road through Lehigh Acres and Buckingham Road though Buckingham.

== County Road 881 ==
County Road 881
- Location: Bonita Springs–Three Oaks
- Length: 13.6 mi (21.9 km)

County Road 881 is the largely unsigned designation along Imperial Parkway though Bonita Springs and Three Oaks Parkway through Estero and Three Oaks. The entire route is controlled by Lee County, except for the short segment between Bonita Beach Road and East Terry Street which is controlled by the city of Bonita Springs.

== County Road 882 ==
County Road 882
- Location: McGregor–Villas
- Length: 2.4 mi (3.9 km)

County Road 882 is an east–west route just south of Fort Myers. It is locally known as College Parkway and it runs 2.4 miles from McGregor Boulevard (SR 867) to U.S. Route 41. Its name is due to its proximity to Florida SouthWestern State College (originally Edison Community College). CR 882's western terminus is an interchange with McGregor Boulevard, with the route continuing west as CR 867A over the Cape Coral Bridge. College Parkway also has an interchange with Summerlin Road (CR 869). CR 882 is only signed at its interchange with Summerlin Road (CR 869).

=== Major intersections ===
Location	mi	km	Destinations	Notes
McGregor	0.00	0.00	SR 867 (McGregor Boulevard)	continues west as CR 867A
Whiskey Creek	1.54	2.48	CR 869 (Summerlin Road)	Interchange
Villas	2.37	3.81	US 41 (South Cleveland Avenue)	
1.000 mi = 1.609 km; 1.000 km = 0.621 mi

== County Road 884 ==
County Road 884
- Location: Cape Coral–Fort Myers and Fort Myers–Alva
- Length: 32.5 mi (52.3 km)

County Road 884 exists in two sections. The western section runs through Cape Coral along the Veterans Parkway before crossing the Midpoint Bridge on to Colonial Boulevard in Fort Myers. The western section terminates at US 41 (Cleveland Avenue) in Fort Myers. The eastern section continues along Colonial Boulevard just east of Interstate 75. The eastern section then runs through Lehigh Acres along Lee Boulevard, Leeland Heights Boulevard, and Joel Boulevard to Alva.

== County Road 885 ==
County Road 885
- Location: Estero–Fort Myers
- Length: 13.00 mi (20.92 km)

County Road 885 runs along Ben Hill Griffin Parkway and Treeline Avenue in Estero and the east side of Fort Myers.

=== Route Description ===
CR 885 begins at Corkscrew Road (CR 850) in Estero. From here, it heads north as a four-lane road named Ben Hill Griffin Parkway paralleling Interstate 75. It passes Miromar Outlets, Florida Gulf Coast University, and Gulf Coast Town Center before intersecting Alico Road (CR 840). Just north of Alico Road, it intersects with Terminal Access Road, which is the main entrance to Southwest Florida International Airport. North of Terminal Access Road, CR 885 is known as Treeline Avenue and it continues north. It intersects Daniels Parkway (CR 876) and passes some residential communities before terminating at Colonial Boulevard (CR 884) on the east side of Fort Myers.

=== History ===
The first major segment of CR 885 to be completed was Ben Hill Griffin Parkway between Alico and Corkscrew Roads. It was named for Ben Hill Griffin, Jr., former chairman of Alico Inc., whose land was partially donated by Griffin's son Ben Hill Griffin III to the state for the construction of Florida Gulf Coast University. Ben Hill Griffin Parkway was completed by 1997 in conjunction with the opening of the university, as it was the main access road.

Treeline Avenue, which originally was a short local road off Daniels Parkway, was extended south and connected to Ben Hill Griffin Parkway in early 2005 in conjunction with the construction of the current terminal at Southwest Florida International Airport. Treeline Avenue was later extended to Colonial Boulevard in 2006.

CR 885 was the primary access to Southwest Florida International Airport until 2015, when Terminal Access Road was extended west to connect directly to Interstate 75.

=== Major intersections ===
Location	mi	km	Destinations	Notes
Estero	0.00	0.00	CR 850 (Corkscrew Road) to I-75	
	4.30	6.92	CR 840 (Alico Road) to I-75	
	5.60	9.01	Terminal Access Road – Southwest Florida International Airport	Partial diamond interchange; former at-grade intersection
	8.00	12.87	CR 876 (Daniels Parkway) to I-75 – Fort Myers, Cape Coral, Gateway, Lehigh Acres, Tampa, Naples	
Fort Myers	13.00	20.92	CR 884 (Colonial Boulevard)	
1.000 mi = 1.609 km; 1.000 km = 0.621 mi

== County Road 887 ==
County Road 887
- Location: Bonita Springs
- Length: 5.3 mi (8.5 km)

County Road 887 is the former designation for Old 41 Road from the Collier County line north through Bonita Springs to US 41.

=== Route description ===
The former CR 887 begins at the Lee/Collier county line, where it continues north from the Collier County segment of CR 887. It heads north and intersects Bonita Beach Road (CR 865) and passes through Downtown Bonita Springs. It terminates at US 41 (Tamiami Trail) in northern Bonita Springs.

=== History ===
The road was originally a routing of Tamiami Trail (US 41) through Downtown Bonita Springs. After US 41 was rerouted to its present alignment in 1976, the former route was redesignated SR 887. SR 887 was turned over to county control in both Lee and Collier Counties in the early 1980s. Bonita Springs became an incorporated city in 1999, and all of CR 887 in Lee County is now controlled by the City of Bonita Springs. While the designation has been largely decommissioned in Lee County, the CR 887 designation is still signed in Collier County.

The SR 887 designation has since been reused for the Port Miami Tunnel since its opening on August 3, 2014.

=== Major intersections ===
The entire route is in Bonita Springs.

mi	km	Destinations	Notes
0.00	0.00	CR 887 south (Old 41 Road)	Continuation into Collier County
1.20	1.93	CR 865 (Bonita Beach Road) to I-75	
5.30	8.53	US 41 (Tamiami Trail)	
1.000 mi = 1.609 km; 1.000 km = 0.621 mi

== See also ==
- Former state roads in Florida
