= County Road 876 (Lee County, Florida) =

Road in Florida, United States

State Road 876 and County Road 876

Route information
- Maintained by FDOT and Lee County DOT
- Length: 22.92 mi (36.89 km)

Major junctions
- West end: SR 867 in McGregor
- US 41 in Villas; I-75 near Fort Myers; SR 82 in Gateway
- East end: SR 80 in Fort Myers Shores

Location
- Country: United States
- State: Florida
- County: Lee

Highway system
- Florida State Highway System; Interstate; US; State; Former; Pre‑1945; Toll; Scenic
← SR 874	→ SR 878

County Road 876 (CR 876) is a major county road in Lee County, Florida spanning 22.92 miles (36.89 km). It is major east-west thoroughfare just south of Fort Myers city limits before becoming a north-south route through Lehigh Acres and Buckingham. The east-west portion is locally known as Cypress Lake Drive west of U.S. Route 41 (Tamiami Trail) and Daniels Parkway east of there. The north-south segment is known as Gunnery Road through Lehigh Acres and Buckingham Road through Buckingham.

Daniels Parkway was previously State Road 876 (SR 876), but the Florida Department of Transportation (FDOT) later relinquished all of Daniels Parkway to Lee County. However, FDOT still maintains a 0.513 miles (0.83 km) portion of Daniels Parkway between the Interstate 75 interchange and the entrance to I-75's rest area. This short segment is still inventoried by FDOT as SR 876, but it is signed from I-75 as CR 876.

== Route description ==
CR 876 begins at McGregor Boulevard (SR 867) in McGregor and travels east as a four-lane road named Cypress Lake Drive through the community of Cypress Lake. Less than two miles later, Cypress Lake Drive intersects with Summerlin Road (CR 869) near the campus of Florida SouthWestern State College and it expands to six lanes. In another mile, Cypress Lake Drive intersects with U.S. Route 41 (Tamiami Trail) near Bell Tower Shops.

CR 876 continues east of US 41 as Daniels Parkway. In another mile, Daniels Parkway crosses the Ten Mile Canal, the John Yarbrough Linear Park, and the Seminole Gulf Railway before intersecting with SR 739 (Metro Parkway). East of SR 739, Daniels Parkway passes Gulf Coast Medical Center and intersects with CR 865 (Ben C. Pratt Six Mile Cypress Parkway) less than a mile later. Daniels Parkway continues east and crosses the Six Mile Cypress Slough as it approaches an interchange with Interstate 75. Interstate has a rest area located on the northeast corner of the interchange which can only be accessed through Daniels Parkway. Half a mile east of Interstate 75, Daniels Parkway intersects with Treeline Avenue (CR 885), which provides access to Southwest Florida International Airport. From here, Daniels Parkway continues east toward the community of Gateway. Just west of Gateway, it passes JetBlue Park, the spring training home of the Boston Red Sox. Beyond Gateway, Daniels Parkway is reduced to four lanes as it continues to its intersection with SR 82. The intersection with SR 82 is a continuous flow intersection (the first in the state of Florida).

At SR 82, CR 876 enters Lehigh Acres and becomes Gunnery Road. Gunnery Road turns north after SR 82 and passes through a residential section of Lehigh Acres. Two miles later, Gunnery Road intersects with Lee Boulevard (CR 884), the main east-west thoroughfare through Lehigh Acres. Beyond Lee Boulevard, Gunnery Road is reduced to a two-lane undivided road and continues north and ends at Buckingham Road near Buckingham Field.

From here, CR 876 continues north along Buckingham Road through the residential community of Buckingham. About three miles later, it crosses the Orange River and passes the Buckingham Community Center. Beyond Buckingham, CR 876 comes to its terminus at SR 80 near Olga and Fort Myers Shores.

== History ==
Daniels Parkway, once known as Daniels Road, was originally a two-lane dirt cattle trail in the 1920s. It served a major cattle ranch operated by Barney Daniels and his son (for whom the road is named) near the intersection of present-day Plantation Road. Daniels Road would also serve agricultural areas farther east.

The route of CR 876 west of Tamiami Trail (US 41) to McGregor Boulevard (SR 867) was originally a two-lane dirt road named Radio Beam Road. In 1960, Radio Beam Road was renamed Cypress Lake Drive, which was named after the newly-built Cypress Lake Country Club (now known as the Cypress Lake Golf Club). The country club was named after the numerous cypress trees in the area.

By the mid 1970s, Daniels Road was paved from US 41 up to the Ten Mile Canal and its crossing with the Seaboard Coast Line Railroad (the present-day Seminole Gulf Railway). By this time, construction was underway on Interstate 75, which would have an interchange with Daniels Road. I-75 was completed through Lee County in 1979. The remaining unpaved segment of Daniels Road west of I-75 was paved by 1981. The route would briefly carry the designation State Road 876 before being turned over to the county.

Construction of Southwest Florida Regional Airport (now Southwest Florida International Airport) began in 1980 which would make Daniels Road a major thoroughfare. Daniels Road was expanded to a four-lane divided road with frontage roads from I-75 east to Chamberlin Parkway. Chamberlin Parkway would be the main entrance to the airport's original terminal when it opened in 1983. At this time, Daniels Road continued east of Chamberlin Parkway as a two-lane road providing access to the airport's fuel farm.

In 1986, Westinghouse Communities Inc. (WCI) began construction of the community of Gateway just north-northeast of Southwest Florida Regional Airport. As the community was developed, Daniels Road was expanded to a four-lane road from Chamberlin Parkway to Gateway.

Cypress Lake Drive was widened to four lanes and Daniels Road was widened to six lanes from US 41 to Chamberlin Parkway by end of 1991. Daniels Road was also renamed Daniels Parkway in 1991.

Daniels Parkway was extended again in 2000 from Gateway to State Road 82 making it a continuous route with Gunnery Road in Lehigh Acres. When the extension was complete, the CR 876 designation was then extended to include Gunnery Road and Buckingham Road. Gunnery Road is named for the Flexible Gunnery School, which trained fighter pilots and bomber crewmen at Buckingham Army Airfield during World War II. Buckingham Road was previously designated SR 82A from Buckingham Field south to SR 82, and SR 861 from there north to Orange River Boulevard. The northern section of Buckingham Road, along with Old Olga Road and Orange River Boulevard, were part of the original alignment of SR 80 before the late 1940s.

Cypress Lake Drive was widened to six lanes east of Summerlin Road in the early 2000s. Further east, Gunnery Road was widened to four lanes from SR 82 to Lee Boulevard (CR 884) in 2007.

Daniels Parkway was widened to six lanes from Chamberlin Parkway to Gateway Boulevard in 2012, which coincided with the opening of JetBlue Park, the spring training home of the Boston Red Sox.

== Major intersections ==
The entire route is in Lee County.

Location	mi	km	Destinations	Notes
McGregor	0.0	0.0	SR 867 (McGregor Boulevard) – Cape Coral	
Cypress Lake	1.7	2.7	CR 869 (Summerlin Road) – FSW State College	
Villas	2.7	4.3	US 41 (Cleveland Avenue)	
	3.8	6.1	SR 739 (Metro Parkway)	
	4.7	7.6	CR 865 (Ben C. Pratt Six Mile Cypress Parkway) – Sports Complex, Lakes Park	
	7.36	11.84	I-75 – Tampa, Naples	Exit 131 on I-75; western terminus of SR 876
	7.76	12.49	Rest Area / Florida Highway Patrol	Eastern terminus of SR 876
	7.9	12.7	CR 885 (Treeline Avenue) – Southwest Florida International Airport	To Florida Gulf Coast University, Germain Arena
	8.7	14.0	Chamberlin Parkway – Skyplex Commercial Center	Former airport access
Gateway–Lehigh Acres line	13.31	21.42	SR 82 – Lehigh Acres, Immokalee	
Lehigh Acres	15.76	25.36	CR 884 (Lee Boulevard) – Lehigh Acres, Alva	
Olga–Fort Myers Shores line	22.92	36.89	SR 80 (Palm Beach Boulevard) – Fort Myers, LaBelle	
1.000 mi = 1.609 km; 1.000 km = 0.621 mi: Route transition
