= Summerlin Road =

County road in Lee County, Florida, United States

Summerlin Road
- County Road 869

Route information
- Maintained by Lee County DOT
- Length: 11.7 mi (18.8 km)

Major junctions
- South end: CR 867 near Iona
- SR 865 near Fort Myers Beach; CR 876 near Cypress Lake
- North end: CR 884 in Fort Myers

Location
- Country: United States
- State: Florida
- County: Lee

Highway system
- County roads in Florida; County roads in Lee County

Summerlin Road, also designated as County Road 869 (CR 869), is a major roadway in Lee County, Florida. It serves as a route connecting Fort Myers with the southwestern portion of the county near Punta Rassa. It provides access to the islands of Fort Myers Beach, Sanibel and Captiva.

== Route description ==
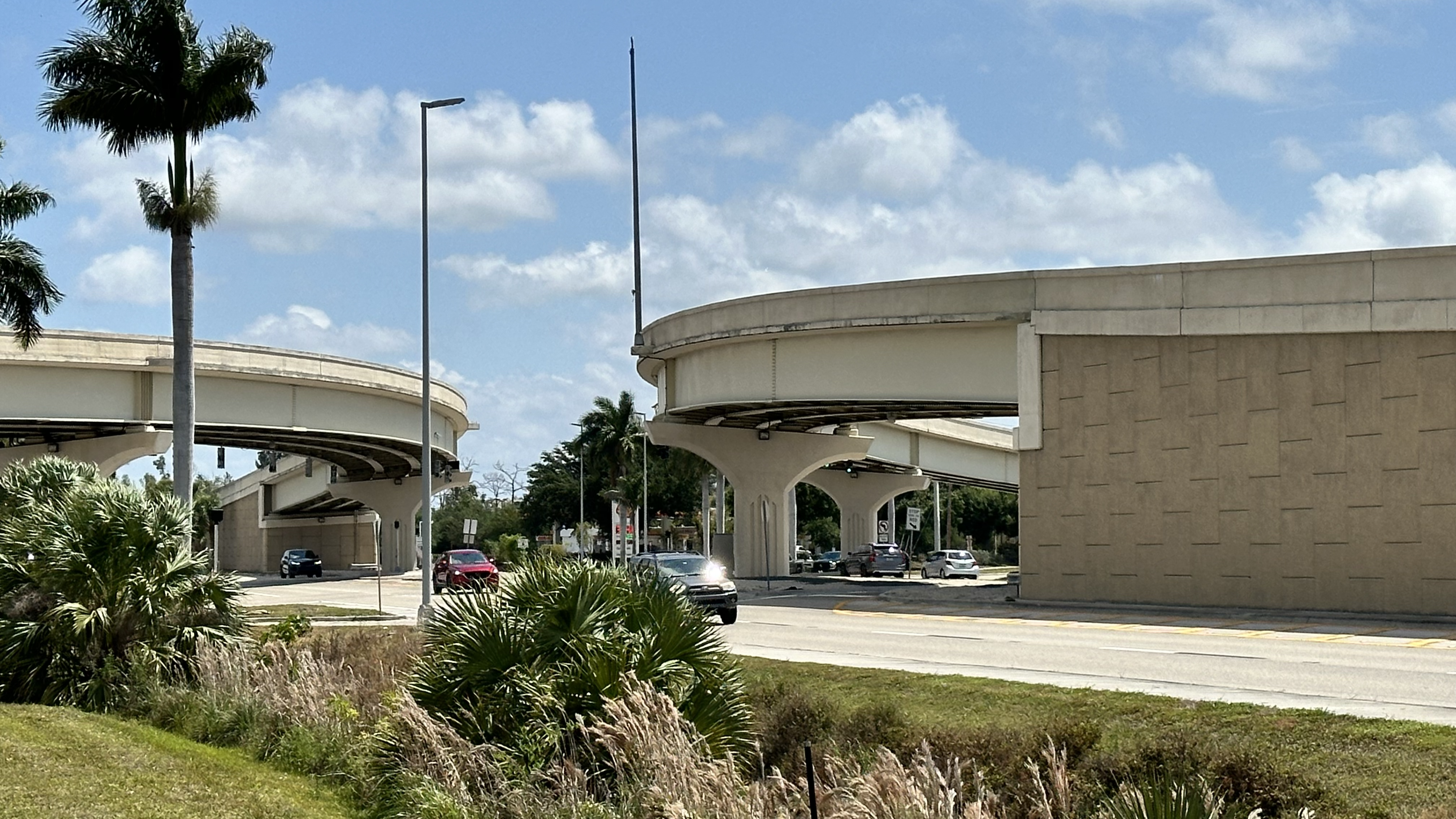
Summerlin Road's intersection with Gladiolus Drive (CR 865), which includes left-turning flyover ramps.

Summerlin Road begins at McGregor Boulevard (CR 867) near Iona and Punta Rassa. From here it proceeds east as a four-lane divided road and it soon intersects San Carlos Boulevard (State Road 865, SR 865) at a single point urban interchange. San Carlos Boulevard provides access to Fort Myers Beach. From San Carlos Boulevard, Summerlin Road becomes six lanes and turns northeast. It intersects Gladiolus Drive (CR 865) at an at-grade intersection with two left-turning flyovers coming from Gladiolus Drive.

From Gladiolus Drive, Summerlin Road turns north and is briefly reduced to four lanes, but becomes six lanes again at Cypress Lake Drive (CR 876). It passes to the east of Florida SouthWestern State College and crosses College Parkway at another single point urban interchange. Summerlin Road continues north passing between Whiskey Creek and Pine Manor. It then loops around the Tanglewood neighborhood and intersects with Boy Scout Drive, a six-lane road which connects to US Highway 41 (US 41, Tamiami Trail). Summerlin Road continues north past Bishop Verot High School and terminates at Colonial Boulevard (CR 884).

== History ==
CR 869 was first proposed in 1971 as an alternative to both US 41 and McGregor Boulevard and providing better access to Fort Myers Beach, Sanibel, and Captiva. It was originally planned to be part of SR 869, but the road was never added to the state highway system since it turned over to Lee County before it opened. The SR 869 designation has since been reused for the Sawgrass Expressway near Fort Lauderdale.

Summerlin Road was originally planned to run through the Tanglewood neighborhood, but local opposition led to its current route around the neighborhood near Boy Scout Drive. The first segments of the road opened in 1981. In early 1982, Lee County officially gave CR 869 its official name, Summerlin Road. It was named for Jacob Summerlin, a prominent Punta Rassa cattleman. The four-lane highway was fully completed in 1983.

Between Gladiolus Drive and Bass Road, Summerlin Road roughly follows the route of the abandoned Punta Rassa Branch of the Seaboard Air Line Railroad, which was removed in 1952.

Summerlin Road was intended to be a limited-access road, but development along the route has since hindered that intent. To better handle increasing traffic, the intersection with San Carlos Bouelvard (SR 865) was upgraded to an interchange in 2007 along with being widened to six lanes. Elevated interchange ramps were also added at the Gladiolus Drive (CR 865) intersection at the same time. The College Parkway (CR 882) intersection was upgraded to an interchange in 2011 along with further widening.

== Major intersections ==
Location	mi	km	Destinations	Notes
Iona	0.00	0.00	CR 867 (McGregor Boulevard) – Sanibel, Captiva	
Iona	2.20	3.54	SR 865 (San Carlos Boulevard) – Cape Coral, Fort Myers Beach	Interchange
Cypress Lake	6.10	9.82	CR 865 (Gladiolus Drive) to I-75 / US 41 – International Airport	At-grade intersection with same-direction flyover ramps
Cypress Lake	7.90	12.71	CR 876 (Cypress Lake Drive) – International Airport	
Cypress Lake	8.70	14.00	CR 882 (College Parkway)	Interchange
Fort Myers	10.50	16.90	Boy Scout Drive to US 41	
Fort Myers	11.70	18.83	CR 884 (Colonial Boulevard)	
1.000 mi = 1.609 km; 1.000 km = 0.621 mi

== Boy Scout Drive ==
Boy Scout Drive extends from Summerlin Road to US 41 near Page Field, a distance of only half a mile. Boy Scout Drive was developed by local developer George Sanders, who also developed the Edison Mall in the early 1960s. Boy Scout Drive was widened to four lanes when Summerlin Road was built as it would provide a direct link with US 41.

In the 1990s, Boy Scout Drive's intersection with Summerlin Road was rebuilt, which also severed its entrance to the Cedarbend neighborhood (which previously existed on the west side of the intersection). A section of Boy Scout Drive near Summerlin Road was widened to six lanes as well. The rest of Boy Scout Drive was widened to six lanes shortly after when Fowler Street was extended though Page Field to US 41 at Boy Scout Drive.
