= McGregor Boulevard =

Road in Lee County, Florida

McGregor Boulevard
- State Road 867 and County Road 867
- CR 867 in blue, SR 867 in red, city-maintained portion in grey, CR 867A in magenta

Route information
- Maintained by FDOT, Lee County DOT, and the city of Fort Myers
- Length: 14.522 mi (23.371 km): 6.622 miles (10.657 km) as SR 867; 7.9 miles (12.71 km) as CR 867
- Existed: 1945–present

Major junctions
- South end: Sanibel Causeway in Punta Rassa
- SR 865 / CR 865 in Iona
- North end: US 41 / SR 80 / SR 82 in Fort Myers

Location
- Country: United States
- State: Florida
- County: Lee

Highway system
- Florida State Highway System; Interstate; US; State; Former; Pre‑1945; Toll; Scenic
← SR 865	→ SR 869

State Road 867 (SR 867) and County Road 867 (CR 867) together create a 14.6-mile (23.5 km) long road known as McGregor Boulevard in Lee County, Florida, paralleling the Caloosahatchee River between Punta Rassa and Fort Myers. The entire road was formerly state-maintained.

== Route description ==
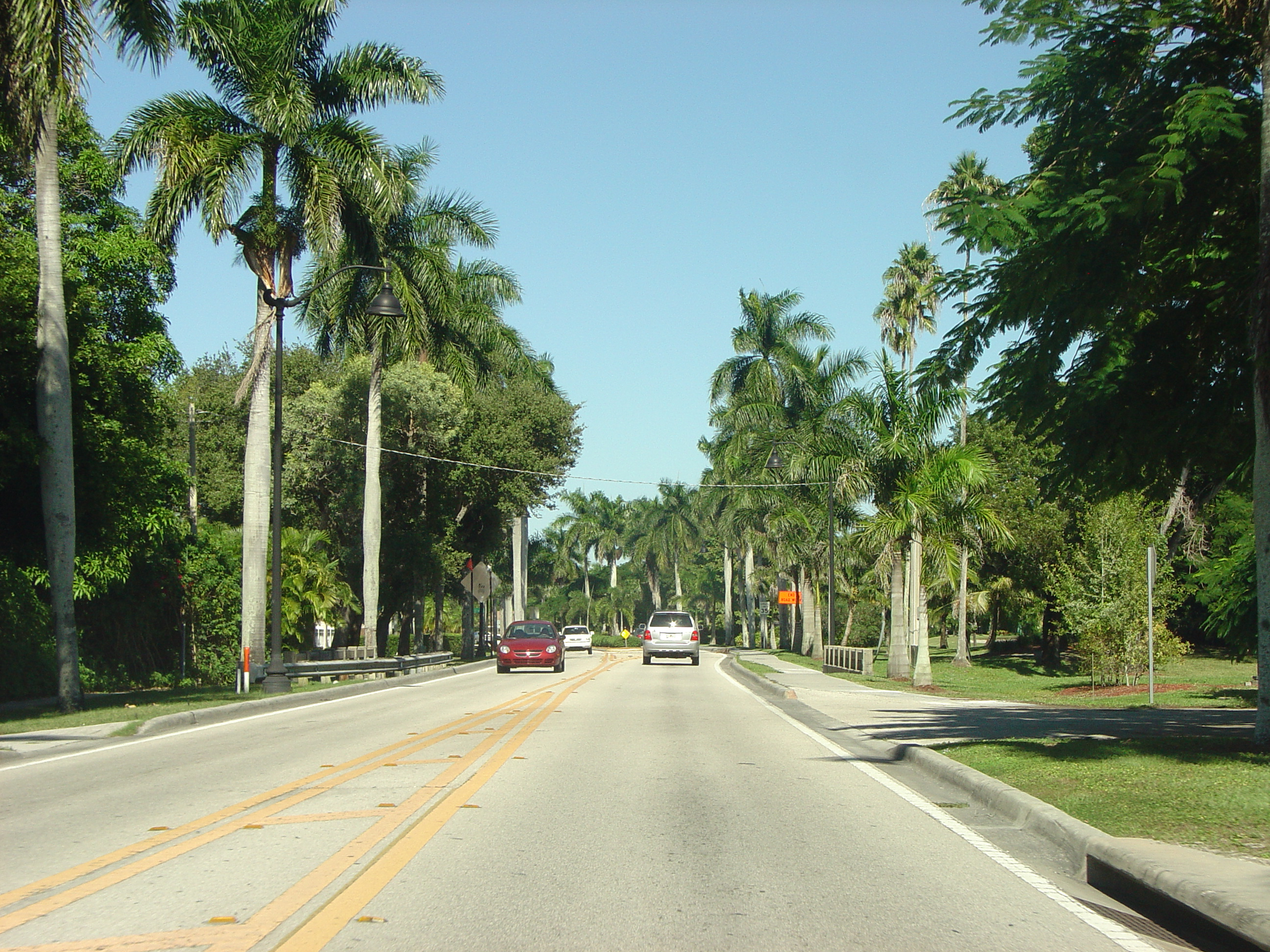
Palm trees line McGregor Boulevard through Fort Myers, nicknamed the "City of Palms"

=== County Road 867 ===
The southern terminus of Historic SR 867 (now CR 867) is located in Punta Rassa at the foot of the Sanibel Causeway, and it is the only access to Punta Rassa and Sanibel Island. From here, CR 867 is a four-lane divided highway as it travels east from the coast through Mangrove-rich mudflats of San Carlos Bay to Truckland. After the intersection with CR 869 (Summerlin Road) in Truckland, CR 867 continues northeast to the community of Iona. In Iona, it intersects with SR 865/CR 865 (San Carlos Boulevard/Gladiolus Drive), which is where the CR 867 designation ends.

=== State Road 867 ===
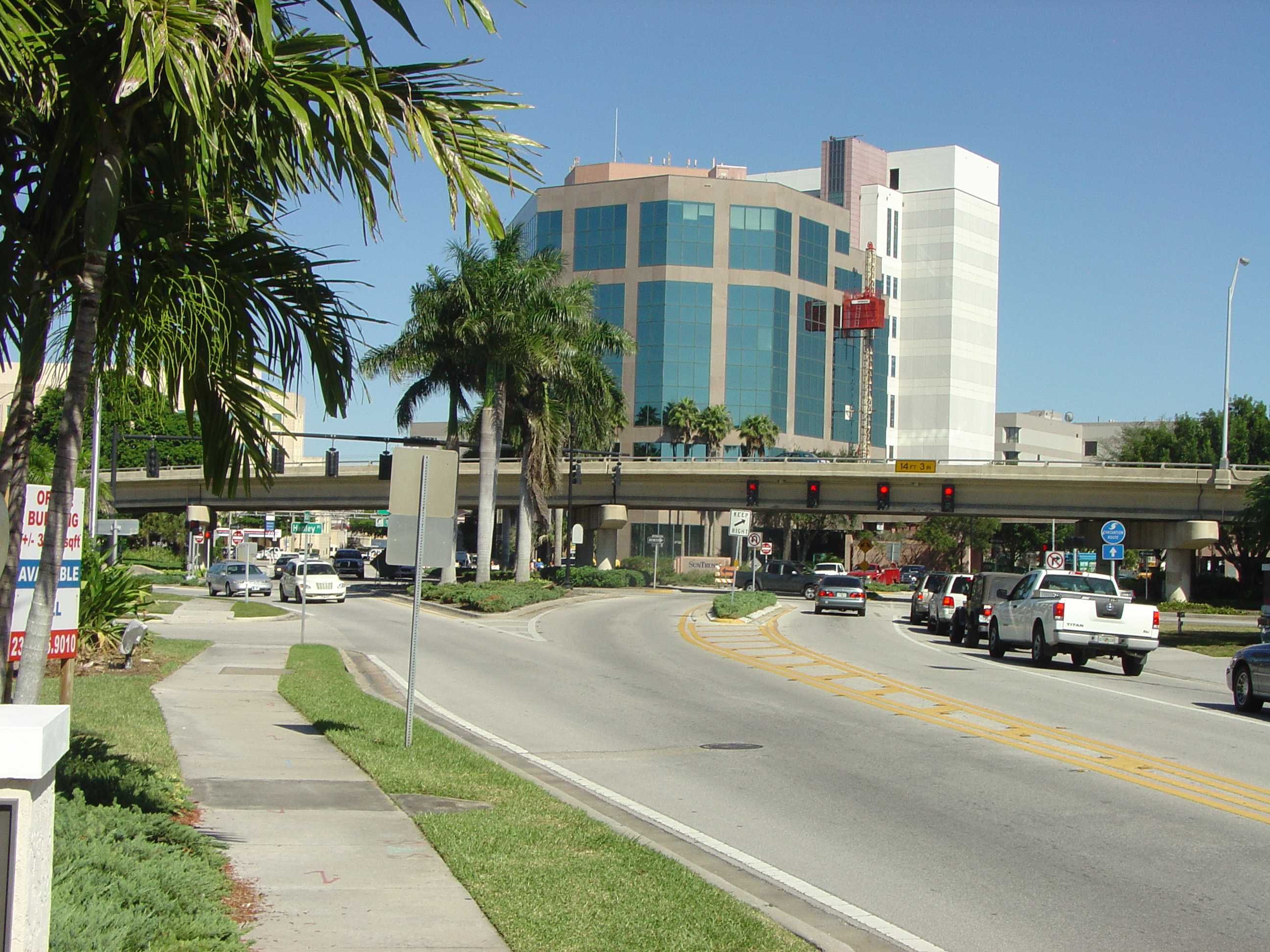
The historic northern terminus of SR 867 at Five Points intersection

SR 867 signage begins where CR 867 left off at the SR 865/CR 865 intersection in Iona. It continues in a northeast trajectory to just west of Cypress Lake where it turns to a north–south trajectory. Just north of Cypress Lake is the intersection the southern terminus of CR 867A, which crosses the Caloosahatchee River into Cape Coral on the Cape Coral Bridge. The route continues in the opposite direction as College Parkway.

SR 867 continues north and passes through the communities of McGregor and Whiskey Creek before entering Fort Myers' city limits. Once in Fort Myers, it terminates at CR 884 (Colonial Boulevard), Lee County's main east–west thoroughfare.

=== Northern section ===
SR 867 currently terminates at CR 884, but McGregor Boulevard continues north as a city street. It passes the Fort Myers Country Club and the Edison and Ford Winter Estates as it enters downtown Fort Myers, before terminating at US 41 (Cleveland Avenue) at the historic Five Points intersection (the former terminus of SR 867, which is also the terminus of SR 80 and SR 82, making a five-way intersection).

== History ==
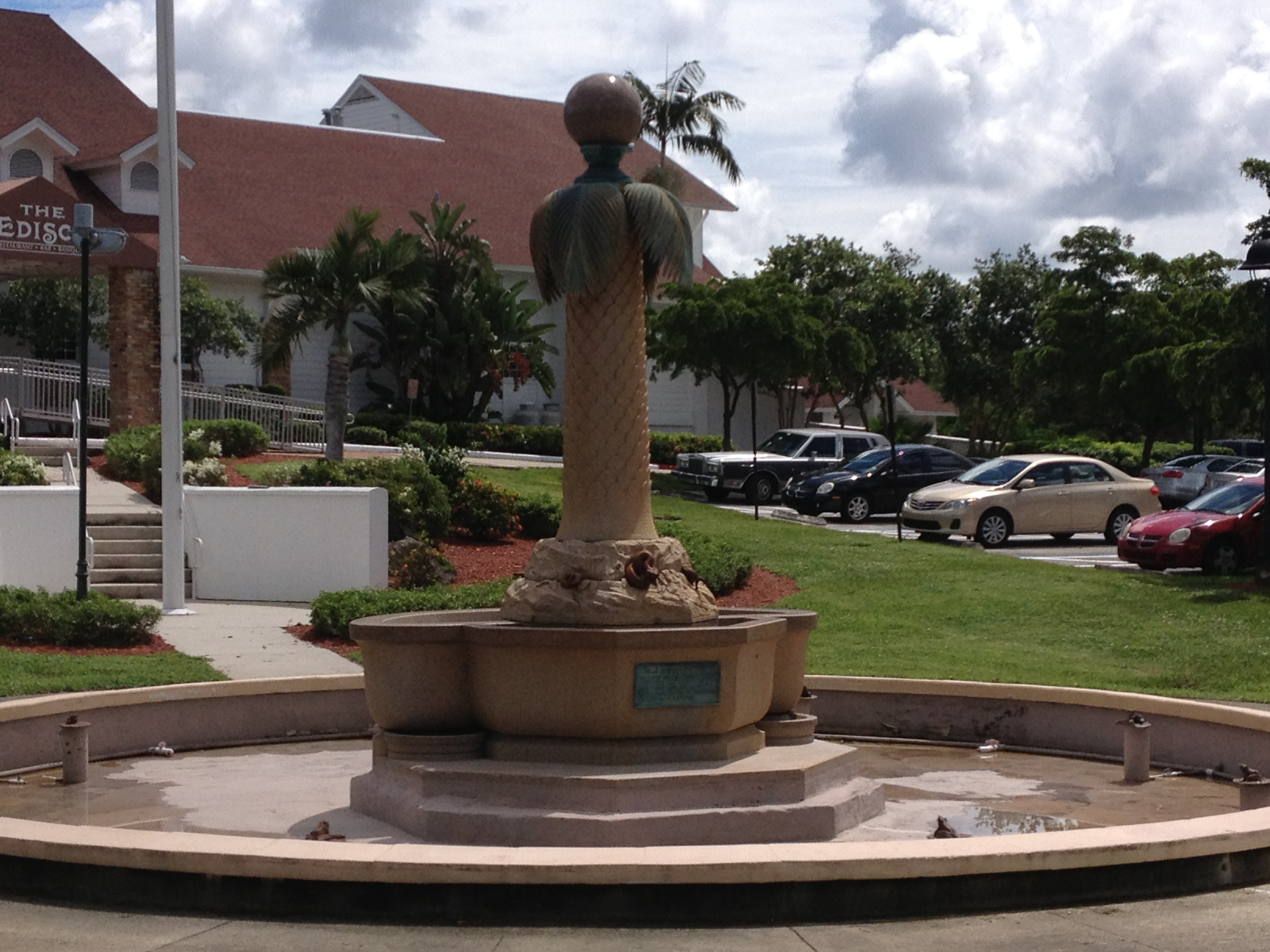
Tootie McGregor Terry Memorial Fountain currently located at Fort Myers Country Club. It formerly stood at the Five Points intersection before the overpass was constructed

McGregor Boulevard, originally known as Riverside Avenue, was used historically by cattlemen to run cattle from Fort Myers to Punta Rassa, which was a significant cattle shipping town at the time. McGregor Boulevard is named after former Standard Oil executive Ambrose McGregor who, along with his wife Tootie, lived next door to Thomas Edison's estate in Fort Myers.

After McGregor's death in 1900, Tootie and her second husband Dr. Marshall Orlando Terry (another local figure who donated land for Terry Park Ballfield) sought to have the road paved. They offered financial assistance to the county on the condition that it would be named McGregor Boulevard. Tootie McGregor died before the paving began, and Dr. Terry saw the paving to completion. McGregor Boulevard was officially completed in 1915. In honor of Tootie, Dr. Terry had a fountain installed at the north end of McGregor Boulevard at Cleveland Avenue. The fountain was removed in the early 1960s to accommodate the construction of the Caloosahatchee Bridge and overpass over the intersection. The fountain was then relocated to Fort Myers Country Club, where it stands today.

In 1931, McGregor Boulevard was added to the state highway system as was designated part of SR 25, which extended from Punta Rassa to Palm Beach. It was redesignated as SR 867 during the 1945 Florida state Road renumbering, with the portion east of US 41 to Palm Beach becoming SR 80.

In the early 1980s, McGregor Boulevard south of SR 865 was relinquished to county control, becoming CR 867. By then, plans were underway for Summerlin Road (CR 869), which would be an alternative to McGregor Boulevard for reaching Punta Rassa. The construction of Summerlin Road also included widening McGregor Boulevard from Summerlin Road to the Sanibel Causeway, which was complete by 1983. Around the same time, McGregor Boulevard was also widened from Summerlin Road to SR 865. This widening project also included realignment of its intersection with SR 865 south 0.2 mile with the northernmost 0.2 miles of SR 865 becoming part of McGregor Boulevard (SR 867). McGregor Boulevard's original alignment would become Old McGregor Boulevard.

The state widened McGregor Boulevard from College Parkway to Cypress Lake Drive (CR 876) to four lanes in the late 1980s, and from Cypress Lake Drive to SR 865 in the late 1990s.

In the mid-2000s, SR 867 north of CR 884 was relinquished to the city of Fort Myers.

== Major intersections ==
The entire route is in Lee County.

Location	mi	km	Destinations	Notes
Punta Rassa	0.0	0.0	Sanibel Causeway / Punta Rassa Road	Southern terminus of CR 867
Iona	1.80	2.90	CR 869 north (Summerlin Road) to I-75 / US 41 – Fort Myers Beach, International Airport	Southern terminus of CR 869
Iona	4.5 0.000	7.2 0.000	SR 865 south (San Carlos Boulevard) / CR 865 north (Gladiolus Drive) to I-75 / US 41 – Fort Myers Beach	Northern terminus of CR 867, southern terminus of SR 867
	2.808	4.519	Cypress Lake Drive (CR 876 east)	Western terminus of CR 876
McGregor	3.610	5.810	CR 867A north / CR 882 east (College Parkway)	Single point urban interchange
Fort Myers	6.622 0.0	10.657 0.0	CR 884 east (Colonial Boulevard) to I-75	Interchange; northern terminus of SR 867, southern terminus of city maintenance
Fort Myers	3.0	4.8	Victoria Avenue to US 41	
Fort Myers	3.4	5.5	SR 80 east / SR 82 east (Martin Luther King Jr. Boulevard) – Downtown Fort Myers	Interchange; northern terminus of city maintenance
1.000 mi = 1.609 km; 1.000 km = 0.621 mi: Route transition

== County Road 867A ==
County Road 867A
- Location: McGregor-Cape Coral
- Length: 18.2 mi (29.3 km)

County Road 867A is the primary north–south arterial road for Cape Coral, Florida. Formerly State Road 867A (SR 867A), it essentially parallels SR 867 on the opposite side of the Caloosahatchee River.

SR 867A became a major route when the Cape Coral Bridge opened in 1964. The southern terminus of what was SR 867A is at an interchange with McGregor Boulevard (SR 867) in McGregor. From the southern terminus, it travels west and crosses the Caloosahatchee River via the Cape Coral Bridge into Cape Coral, Florida. At the west side of the Cape Coral Bridge, SR 867A ran along Cape Coral Parkway for only 0.7 miles (1.1 km) until an intersection with Del Prado Boulevard. From here, it turned north and followed Del Prado Boulevard northward to its terminus at SR 78 (Pine Island Road)

Del Prado Boulevard was known as Harney Point Road prior to 1965. Since being turned over to the county in the early 1980s, Del Prado Boulevard has been extended north beyond Pine Island Road into North Fort Myers. North of Pine Island Road, addresses on Del Prado Boulevard have the attached "North" suffix to the name of the road; south of Pine Island Road uses "South." From Pine Island Road, Del Prado Boulevard continues as a city street, though the city of Cape Coral maintains the CR 867A designation. It intersects Diplomat Parkway and the Kismet Parkway, before intersecting with US 41 (Tamiami Trail) at the northern Cape Coral city limits. The extension into North Fort Myers was built in the 1990s.

From US 41, Del Prado Boulevard continues east as a rural county road along the northern edge of North Fort Myers. Just past the Prairie Pines Preserve, it briefly becomes Mellow Drive before it terminates at Slater Road. Future plans call for Del Prado Boulevard to be extended north from Mellow Drive in North Fort Myers around the Prairie Pines Preserve to Interstate 75 with a new interchange near the Lee-Charlotte County border.

=== Major intersections ===
The entire route is in Lee County.

Location	mi	km	Destinations	Notes
McGregor	0.0	0.0	SR 867 (McGregor Boulevard) / Magnolia Pointe / Caloosa Y&R Club Drive	Interchange; continues east as College Parkway (CR 882)
Caloosahatchee River	0.8– 1.5	1.3– 2.4	Cape Coral Bridge (westbound toll; SunPass or pay-by-plate)	
Cape Coral	2.2	3.5	Del Prado Boulevard / Cape Coral Parkway	CR 867A turns 90 degrees
Cape Coral	5.2	8.4	CR 884 (Veterans Parkway / Midpoint Memorial Bridge) to I-75	Interchange
Cape Coral	9.4	15.1	SR 78 (Pine Island Road)	
Cape Coral	14.8	23.8	US 41 (North Tamiami Trail / SR 45)	
Slater	18.2	29.3	To I-75 / SR 78 / Slater Road	
1.000 mi = 1.609 km; 1.000 km = 0.621 mi: Electronic toll collection
