= Tanglewood, Florida =

Tanglewood
- Former CDP
- Location within the state of Florida
- Coordinates: 26°34′37″N 81°53′50″W
- Country: United States
- State: Florida
- County: Lee

Area
  - Land: 3.8 sq mi (9.8 km^{2})

Population (1980)
  - Total: 8,229
  - Density: 2,200/sq mi (840/km^{2})
- Time zone: UTC-5 (Eastern (EST))
  - Summer (DST): UTC-4 (EDT)
- Area code: 239
- FIPS code: 71112

Tanglewood was a Census-designated place in Lee County, Florida during the 1980 United States Census. The population in 1980 was 8,229. The census area was partially annexed by neighboring Fort Myers while the remainder of the area was reassigned to the newly designated CDPs of Whiskey Creek & McGregor. It was part of the Cape Coral-Fort Myers, Florida Metropolitan Statistical Area.

== Geography ==
The census area of Tanglewood was located at approximately 26.576992 north, 81.897271 west. The census area was located adjacent to the city of Fort Myers and north of Villas. The CDP had a land area of 3.8 square miles (9.8 square kilometers).
