= Florida State Road 884 =

State highway in Florida, United States

State Road 884 and County Road 884
- SR 884 highlighted in red

Route information
- Maintained by FDOT and Lee County DOT
- Length: 37.589 mi (60.494 km) 5.289 miles (8.512 km) as SR 884; 32.3 miles (51.98 km) as CR 884

Major junctions
- West end: SR 78 / CR 78 / CR 765 in Lehigh Acres
- US 41 in Fort Myers; I-75 in Fort Myers; SR 82 in Fort Myers
- East end: SR 80 in Alva

Location
- Country: United States
- State: Florida
- County: Lee

Highway system
- Florida State Highway System; Interstate; US; State; Former; Pre‑1945; Toll; Scenic
← SR 882	→ SR 886

State Road 884 (SR 884), along with County Road 884 (CR 884), together create Lee County, Florida's primary east–west partially controlled access highway, linking Cape Coral in the western portion of the county to Lehigh Acres and Alva in the eastern portion. Currently, the highway consists of State Road 884, and two segments of County Road 884 on each end, and the entire highway is about 37.5 miles (60.4 km) long. The highway runs through the southern incorporated limits of the city of Fort Myers and through the mid part of Cape Coral, and has become a major commuter route.

== Route description ==
=== County Road 884 (Cape Coral and Fort Myers) ===
County Road 884 begins in Cape Coral as Veterans Parkway, a limited-access highway, heading south from the intersection with SR 78 and then turning east, with an interchange at Del Prado Boulevard (County Road 867A). After crossing the Caloosahatchee River on the Midpoint Bridge into Fort Myers the highway, it is known as Colonial Boulevard, a controlled-access road. Following intersections with McGregor Boulevard (SR 867), and Summerlin Road (CR 869), it has an interchange at Cleveland Avenue (Tamiami Trail-U.S. Route 41), where it becomes State Road 884.

=== State Road 884 ===
State Road 884 begins at the eastern end of the Tamiami Trail intersection, heading east through the southern end of Fort Myers. The route intersects State Road 739 (Metro Parkway) and passes by the Calusa Nature Center and Planetarium before coming to a continuous flow intersection with CR 865 (Ortiz Avenue/Six Mile Cypress Parkway). Just beyond CR 865, State Road 884 comes to a diverging diamond interchange with Interstate 75 west of Lehigh Acres. State Road 884 officially ends just east of I-75 at Dynasty Drive.

=== County Road 884 (Lehigh Acres and Alva) ===
The eastern half of CR 884 begins where SR 884 left off, heading east towards an intersection with SR 82 in Lehigh Acres, and becomes Lee Boulevard. It eventually becomes Leeland Heights Boulevard before turning north on Joel Boulevard. The road terminates at an intersection with Palm Beach Boulevard (SR 80) near Alva.

== History ==
Colonial Boulevard was an early city street that ran from McGregor Boulevard (SR 867) to US 41 (Tamiami Trail). It was extended from US 41 to Fowler Street in the early 1960s. The opening of the Edison Mall in 1965 at the corner of US 41 brought additional traffic to Colonial Boulevard, which was widened to four lanes in the early 1970s.

As Interstate 75 was being planned though Southwest Florida in the 1970s, plans were also made to extend Colonial Boulevard to the freeway. The extension of Colonial Boulevard from Fowler Street to Ortiz Avenue (SR 80B at the time) opened on October 7, 1976. Colonial Boulevard would connect with Interstate 75 when the freeway opened in 1979, which completed the state-controlled segment of SR 884 as it is today. The state widened Colonial Boulevard from SR 739 (Metro Parkway) to Interstate 75 to six lanes in 1991. On October 15, 1990, Lee County opened a four-lane extension of Colonial Boulevard (CR 884) from Interstate 75 east to SR 82 at its intersection with Lee Boulevard, the primary east-west route through Lehigh Acres. This segment was widened to six lanes in 2012. Lee Boulevard previously existed as SR 82B while Joel Boulevard, Leeland Heights Boulevard, and Alabama Road were part of State Road 873 (SR 873). In the mid-1970s, Florida Department of Transportation designated them as secondary state roads. They were eventually redesignated as CR 884 when Colonial Boulevard was extended to Lee Boulevard.

At the other end, CR 884 was extended east of McGregor Boulevard into Cape Coral in 1997 with the completion of the Midpoint Memorial Bridge and Veterans Parkway, a limited-access highway with an interchange at Del Prado Boulevard (CR 867A). The construction of the Midpoint Bridge also led to the widening of Colonial Boulevard west of Metro Parkway to six lanes and the construction of overpasses over US 41 and McGregor Boulevard. Veterans Parkway initially ran as far as Santa Barbara Boulevard, but it was extended to Pine Island Road (SR 78) by 2002.

In the late 2000s, improvements were planned for the corridor between Chiquita Boulevard in Cape Coral and I-75, which included additional overpasses and express lanes. The plans were later abandoned due to local opposition.

In mid 2024, the Florida Department of Transportation upgraded SR 884's interchange with Interstate 75 to a diverging diamond interchange. The project also upgraded the adjacent intersection with CR 865 to a continuous flow intersection and the intersection with Forum Boulevard to a restricted crossing U-turn intersection, both of which were completed in early 2025.

== Major intersections ==
The entire route is in Lee County.

Location	mi	km	Destinations	Notes
Cape Coral	0.0	0.0	SR 78 east / CR 78 west (Pine Island Road) / Burnt Store Road (CR 765 north)	Western terminus of CR 884; termini of SR 78; CR 78; and CR 765
Cape Coral	8.0	12.9	CR 867A (Del Prado Boulevard)	Interchange
Cape Coral	8.6	13.8	Toll plaza (westbound only)	
Caloosahatchee River	9.8– 11.3	15.8– 18.2	Midpoint Memorial Bridge	
Fort Myers	11.6	18.7	SR 867 (McGregor Boulevard)	Interchange; westbound exit and eastbound entrance
Fort Myers	11.8	19.0	CR 869 south (Summerlin Road)	Northern terminus of CR 869
Fort Myers	12.5 0.000	20.1 0.000	US 41 (Cleveland Avenue)	Interchange; transition from CR 884 to SR 884
Fort Myers	1.319	2.123	SR 739 (Metro Parkway) – Fort Myers Beach, Sanibel, Captiva	
Fort Myers	4.112	6.618	CR 865 (Ortiz Avenue / Six Mile Cypress Parkway) – Fort Myers Beach, Sanibel, Captiva, Nature Center	
Fort Myers	4.616	7.429	I-75 – Tampa, Naples	Exit 136 on I-75
	5.289 0.0	8.512 0.0	Dynasty Drive	Transition from SR 884 to CR 884
Fort Myers	0.7	1.1	CR 885 south (Treeline Avenue)	Northern terminus of CR 885
Fort Myers	1.7	2.7	SR 82	
Lehigh Acres	5.1	8.2	Gunnery Road (CR 876)	
Alva	19.8	31.9	SR 80 (Palm Beach Boulevard)	Eastern terminus of CR 884
1.000 mi = 1.609 km; 1.000 km = 0.621 mi: Incomplete access; Tolled; Route transition
