= Kari Lerner =

American politician

Member of the New Hampshire House of Representatives
- In office September 26, 2017 – December 4, 2018
- Constituency: Rockingham 4

Personal details
- Party: Democratic
- Education: Southern New Hampshire University

Kari Lerner is an American politician.

== Biography ==
Lerner graduated from Southern New Hampshire University. She was elected to the New Hampshire House of Representatives in a special election. In the 2024 United States House of Representatives elections, she was the Democratic candidate in Florida's 19th congressional district.
