= Pine Manor, Florida =

- Census-designated place
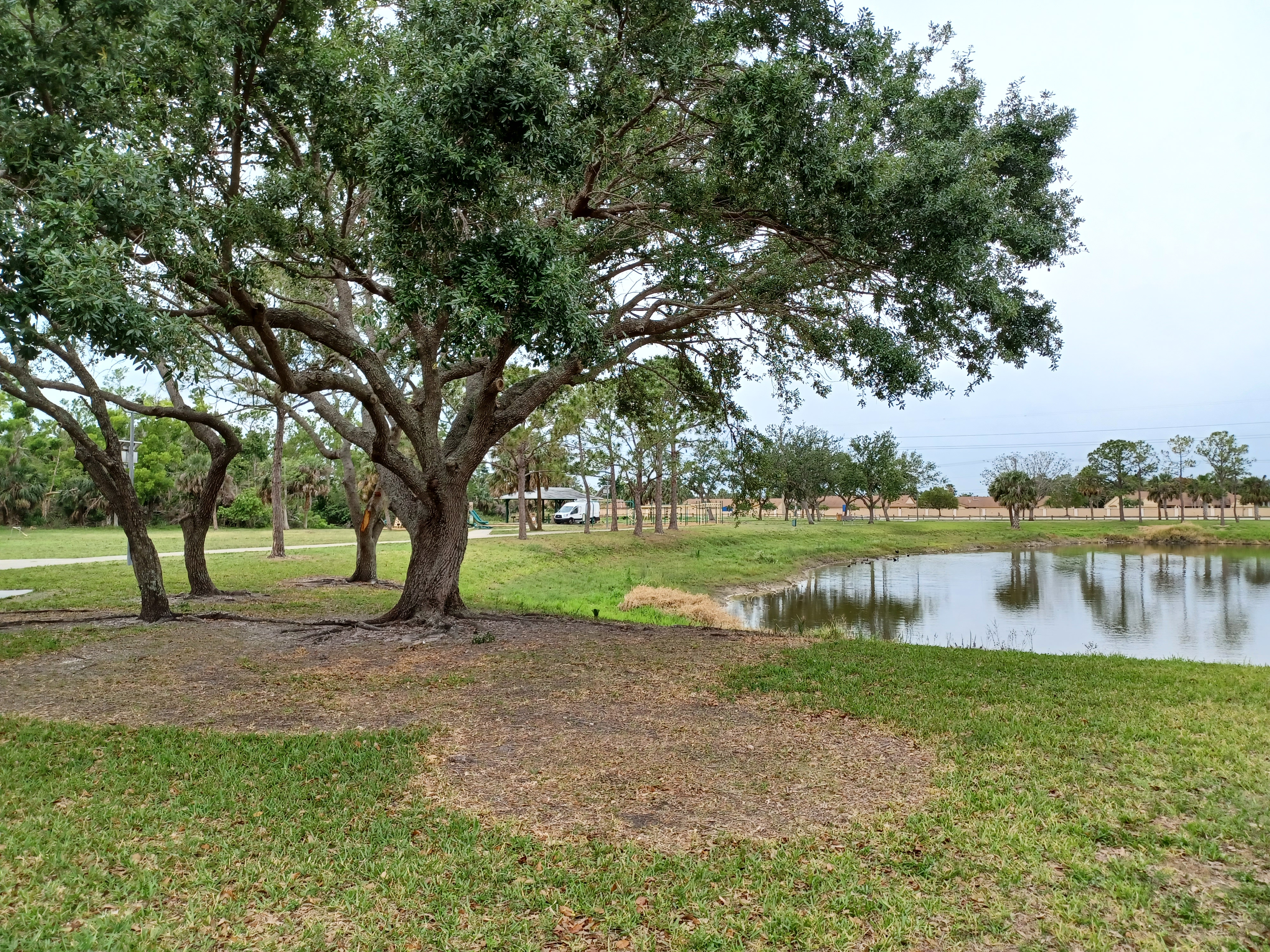
- Hunter Park

- Location in Lee County and the state of Florida
- Coordinates: 26°34′25″N 81°52′32″W
- Country: United States
- State: Florida
- County: Lee

Area
  - Total: 0.47 sq mi (1.21 km^{2})
  - Land: 0.46 sq mi (1.20 km^{2})
  - Water: 0.0039 sq mi (0.01 km^{2})
- Elevation: 10 ft (3.0 m)

Population (2020)
  - Total: 4,122
  - Density: 8,920.9/sq mi (3,444.36/km^{2})
- Time zone: UTC-5 (Eastern (EST))
  - Summer (DST): UTC-4 (EDT)
- ZIP code: 33907
- Area code: 239
- FIPS code: 12-57025
- GNIS feature ID: 2403416

Pine Manor is a census-designated place (CDP) located between U.S. Route 41 (South Cleveland Ave) and Summerlin Road in Lee County, Florida, United States. The population was 4,122 at the 2020 census, up from 3,428 at the 2010 census. It is part of the Cape Coral-Fort Myers, Florida Metropolitan Statistical Area.

== Geography ==
Pine Manor is located in central Lee County. It is bordered to the north by the city of Fort Myers, by Whiskey Creek to the west, and Villas to the south. US 41 forms the eastern boundary of the community; the center of Fort Myers lies 5 miles (8 km) to the north and Estero lies 11 miles (18 km) to the south.

According to the United States Census Bureau, the Pine Manor CDP has a total area of 0.45 square miles (1.17 km^{2}), of which 0.004 square miles (0.01 km^{2}), or 1.17%, are water.

== Demographics ==
Historical population
Census	Pop.	Note	%±
2010	3,428		—
2020	4,122		20.2%
U.S. Decennial Census

=== 2020 census ===
As of the 2020 census, Pine Manor had a population of 4,122. The median age was 30.1 years. 31.6% of residents were under the age of 18 and 6.4% of residents were 65 years of age or older. For every 100 females there were 117.4 males, and for every 100 females age 18 and over there were 124.1 males age 18 and over.

100.0% of residents lived in urban areas, while 0.0% lived in rural areas.

There were 1,234 households in Pine Manor, of which 46.4% had children under the age of 18 living in them. Of all households, 33.4% were married-couple households, 27.6% were households with a male householder and no spouse or partner present, and 26.3% were households with a female householder and no spouse or partner present. About 20.5% of all households were made up of individuals and 3.8% had someone living alone who was 65 years of age or older.

There were 1,335 housing units, of which 7.6% were vacant. The homeowner vacancy rate was 0.8% and the rental vacancy rate was 4.3%.

Racial composition as of the 2020 census
Race	Number	Percent
White	1,211	29.4%
Black or African American	493	12.0%
American Indian and Alaska Native	71	1.7%
Asian	7	0.2%
Native Hawaiian and Other Pacific Islander	1	0.0%
Some other race	1,086	26.3%
Two or more races	1,253	30.4%
Hispanic or Latino (of any race)	2,768	67.2%

== Gallery ==
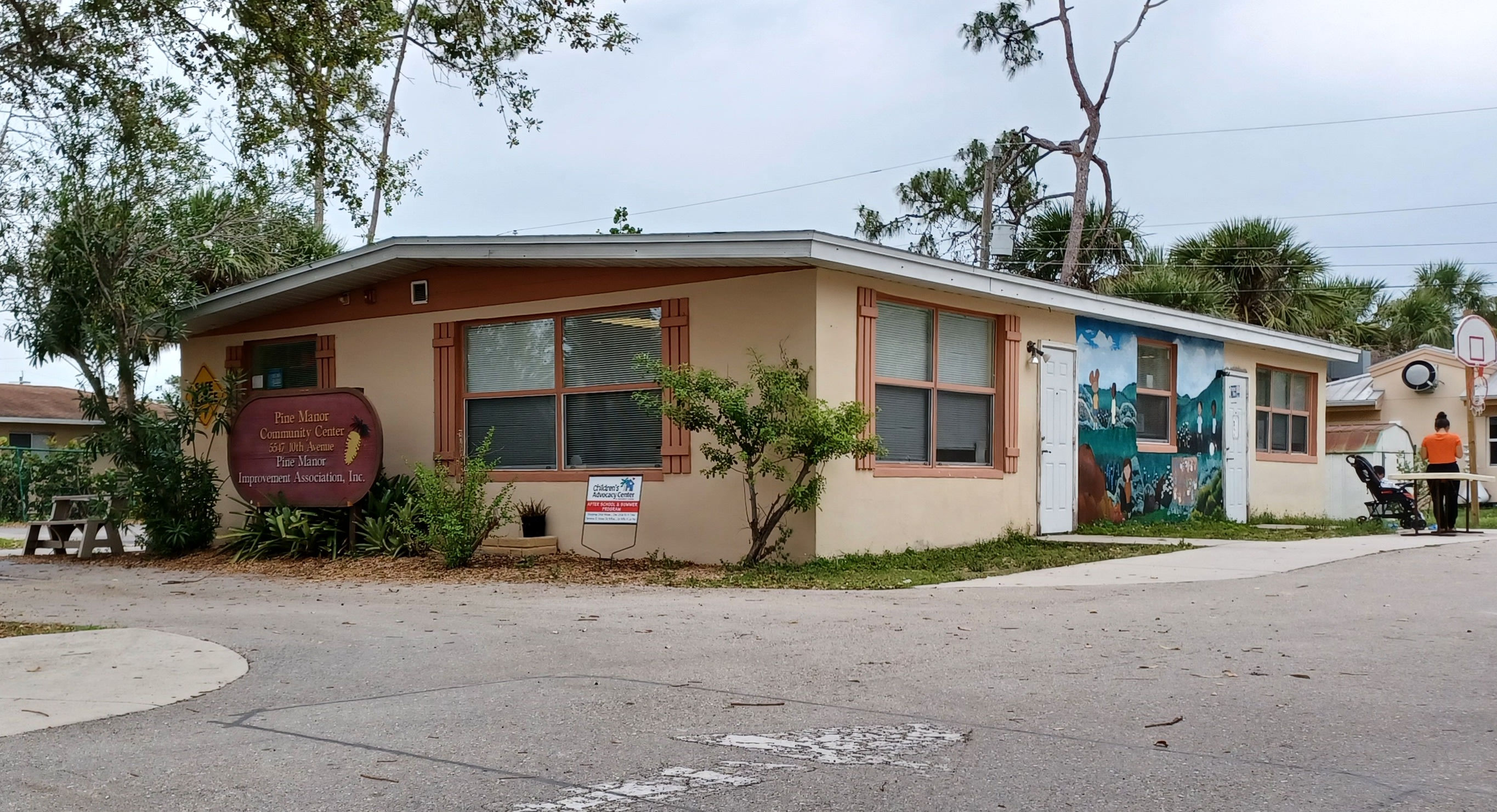
Community center

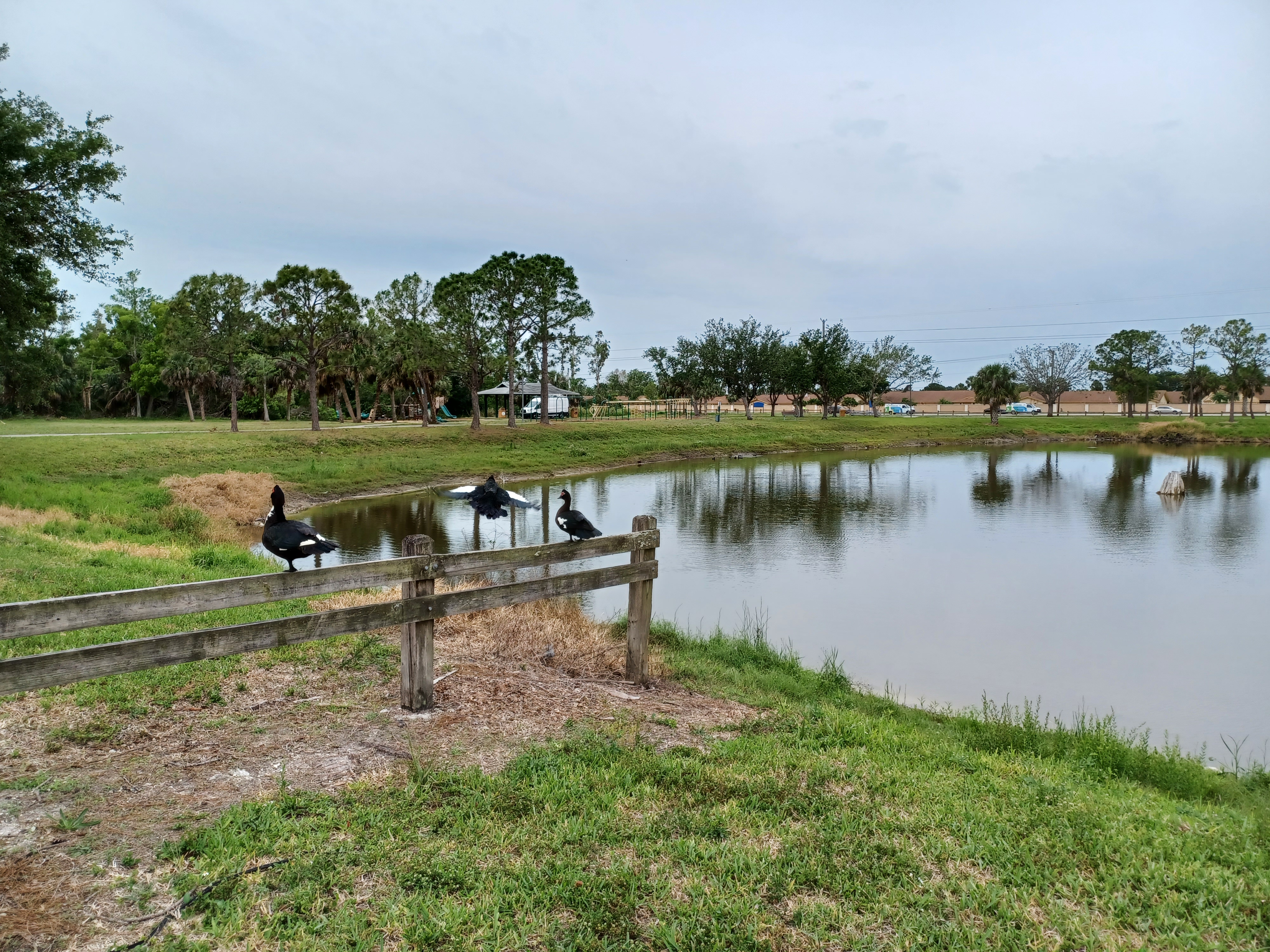
Hunter Park

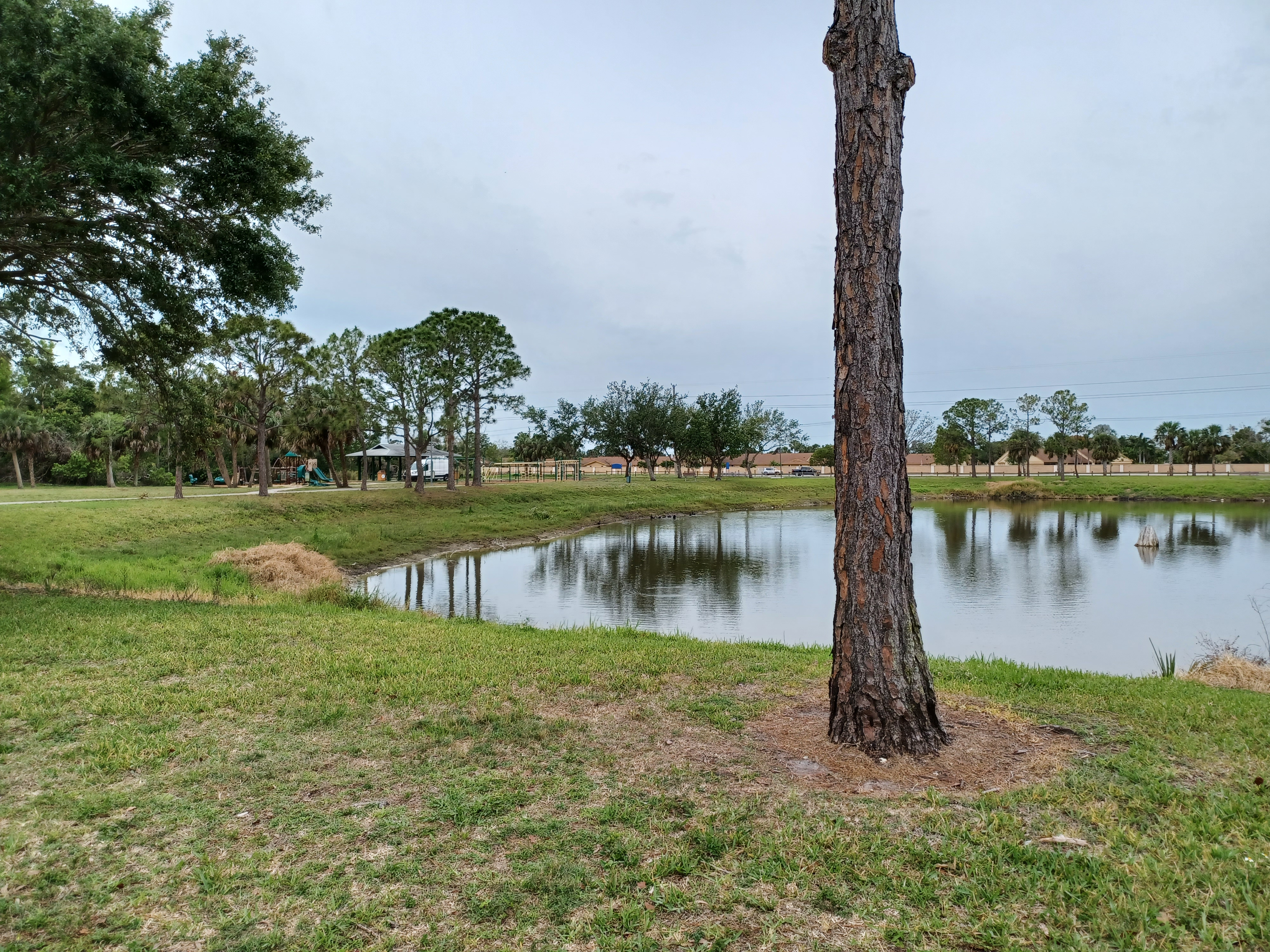
Hunter Park
