= Page Park, Florida =

- Census-designated place
- Location in Lee County and the state of Florida
- Coordinates: 26°34′41″N 81°51′41″W
- Country: United States
- State: Florida
- County: Lee

Area
  - Total: 0.27 sq mi (0.70 km^{2})
  - Land: 0.27 sq mi (0.70 km^{2})
  - Water: 0 sq mi (0.00 km^{2})
- Elevation: 13 ft (4.0 m)

Population (2020)
  - Total: 747
  - Density: 2,777.6/sq mi (1,072.42/km^{2})
- Time zone: UTC-5 (Eastern (EST))
  - Summer (DST): UTC-4 (EDT)
- ZIP code: 33907
- Area code: 239
- FIPS code: 12-53775
- GNIS feature ID: 2403385

Page Park is a census-designated place (CDP) in Lee County, Florida, United States. The population was 747 at the 2020 census, up from 514 at the 2010 census. It is part of the Cape Coral-Fort Myers, Florida Metropolitan Statistical Area.

== Geography ==
Page Park is located in central Lee County 4 miles (6 km) south of the center of Fort Myers, the county seat. It is bordered to the north by Page Field, a public airport, and to the south by unincorporated Fort Myers Villas.

According to the United States Census Bureau, the Page Park CDP has a total area of 0.3 square miles (0.7 km^{2}), all land.

== Demographics ==
Historical population
Census	Pop.	Note	%±
2000	524		—
2010	514		−1.9%
2020	747		45.3%
U.S. Decennial Census

As of the census of 2000, there were 524 people, 235 households, and 105 families residing in the CDP. The population density was 1,890.9 inhabitants per square mile (730.1/km^{2}). There were 261 housing units at an average density of 941.8 per square mile (363.6/km^{2}). The racial makeup of the CDP was 86.45% White, 3.05% African American, 0.19% Asian, 0.19% Pacific Islander, 8.21% from other races, and 1.91% from two or more races. Hispanic or Latino of any race were 21.76% of the population.

There were 235 households, out of which 26.0% had children under the age of 18 living with them, 23.4% were married couples living together, 13.6% had a female householder with no husband present, and 55.3% were non-families. 40.4% of all households were made up of individuals, and 3.4% had someone living alone who was 65 years of age or older. The average household size was 2.23 and the average family size was 3.07.

In the CDP, the population was spread out, with 21.2% under the age of 18, 12.6% from 18 to 24, 39.5% from 25 to 44, 20.6% from 45 to 64, and 6.1% who were 65 years of age or older. The median age was 32 years. For every 100 females, there were 149.5 males. For every 100 females age 18 and over, there were 147.3 males.

The median income for a household in the CDP was $23,600, and the median income for a family was $30,391. Males had a median income of $23,676 versus $21,042 for females. The per capita income for the CDP was $14,281. About 13.4% of families and 13.2% of the population were below the poverty line, including 19.8% of those under age 18 and 11.9% of those age 65 or over.
