= Buckingham Field =

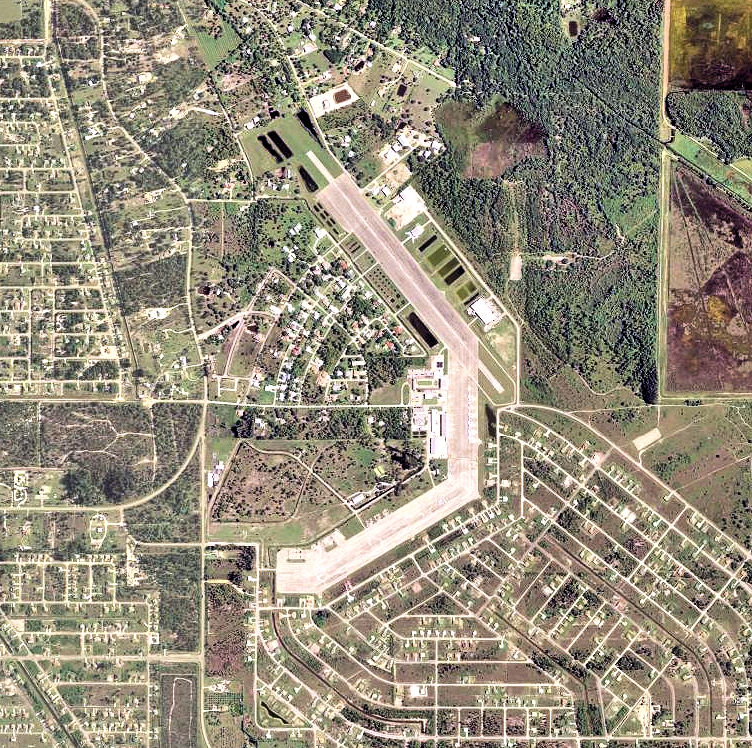
- 2006 USGS airphoto
- IATA: none; ICAO: none; FAA LID: FL59

Summary
- Airport type: Privately owned
- Owner: Lee County Mosquito Control District
- Location: Lee County, near Fort Myers, Florida
- Elevation AMSL: 23 ft (7.0 m)
- Coordinates: 26°38′36″N 081°42′37″W

Map
- Location of Buckingham Field FL59 (the United States)

Runways
Direction	Length		Surface
Direction	ft	m	Surface
14/32	4,046	1,233	Concrete
6/24	2,726	831	Concrete
- Source: Federal Aviation Administration

Buckingham Field (FAA LID: FL59) is a private-use airport located seven nautical miles (13 km) east of the central business district of Fort Myers, in Lee County, Florida, United States. It is privately owned by the Lee County Mosquito Control District. The Buckingham Air Park has deeded access to the airport.

== Facilities ==
Buckingham Field has two concrete paved runways: 14/32 measuring 4,046 x 400 ft (1,233 x 122 m) and 6/24 measuring 2,726 x 400 ft (831 x 122 m).

== History ==
Originally constructed for the United States Army Air Corps as Buckingham Field, the airfield had its origins as an aircraft gunner training base to train the aerial gunners who would defend bombers. The airfield was constructed starting in 1942 at a cost of $10 million on a total of 7,000 acres (28 km^{2}) of swamp land, which had to be drained with an extensive system of newly constructed canals. The airfield originally had three 5,000-foot runways, with two oval tracks of the Ground Moving Target Range, located to the west of the airfield, as well as nearby skeet ranges and trap ranges.

After the war, the barracks at Buckingham were briefly used as the Edison College, but this closed in 1948. Most of the buildings of the original base were subsequently removed over time.

A street grid for a planned housing development named Lehigh Acres was eventually built over the area formerly occupied by Buckingham's runways in the 1950s. By the mid-1970s, the runways were gone except for the concrete ends. The 1978 Miami Sectional Chart depicted three paved portions of Buckingham's former ramp as the runways of the Lehigh Acres West private airfield. The longest runway was depicted as 3,000'.

The street grid built over the location of the former runways remained undeveloped for some period of time, before eventually being partially filled in with houses, it remains, however, about 90% unoccupied.

By 2000, the northern portion of the ramp was used as a runway, being operated as a private field, Buckingham Field Airport, by the Lee County Mosquito/Hyacinth Control District, which operates a fleet of 23 aircraft and helicopters (including C-47s and several rare C-117 Super Dakotas).

Portions of the ramp area are also used for automobile racing.

== See also ==
- List of airports in Florida
