= Lochmoor Waterway Estates, Florida =

- Census-designated place
- Location in Lee County and the state of Florida
- Coordinates: 26°38′06″N 81°54′45″W
- Country: United States
- State: Florida
- County: Lee

Area
  - Total: 3.21 sq mi (8.31 km^{2})
  - Land: 2.39 sq mi (6.20 km^{2})
  - Water: 0.81 sq mi (2.10 km^{2})
- Elevation: 0 ft (0 m)

Population (2020)
  - Total: 5,828
  - Density: 2,432.7/sq mi (939.27/km^{2})
- Time zone: UTC-5 (Eastern (EST))
  - Summer (DST): UTC-4 (EDT)
- ZIP code: 33903
- Area code: 239
- FIPS code: 12-40985
- GNIS feature ID: 2403240

Lochmoor Waterway Estates is an unincorporated community and census-designated place (CDP) in Lee County, Florida, United States. The population was 5,828 at the 2020 census, up from 4,204 at the 2010 census. It is part of the Cape Coral-Fort Myers, Florida Metropolitan Statistical Area.

== Geography ==
Lochmoor Waterway Estates is located in central Lee County on the west side of the tidal Caloosahatchee River, across from Fort Myers, the county seat. It is bordered to the south and west by the city of Cape Coral and to the north by unincorporated North Fort Myers.

According to the United States Census Bureau, the CDP has a total area of 3.0 square miles (7.8 km^{2}), of which 2.2 square miles (5.7 km^{2}) are land and 0.81 square miles (2.1 km^{2}), or 26.61%, are water.

== Demographics ==
Historical population
Census	Pop.	Note	%±
1990	4,091		—
2000	3,858		−5.7%
2010	4,204		9.0%
2020	5,828		38.6%

=== 2020 census ===
As of the 2020 census, Lochmoor Waterway Estates had a population of 5,828. The median age was 55.4 years. 14.9% of residents were under the age of 18 and 32.6% of residents were 65 years of age or older. For every 100 females there were 93.5 males, and for every 100 females age 18 and over there were 92.7 males age 18 and over.

100.0% of residents lived in urban areas, while 0.0% lived in rural areas.

There were 2,555 households in Lochmoor Waterway Estates, of which 19.8% had children under the age of 18 living in them. Of all households, 53.2% were married-couple households, 15.6% were households with a male householder and no spouse or partner present, and 24.3% were households with a female householder and no spouse or partner present. About 25.2% of all households were made up of individuals and 14.2% had someone living alone who was 65 years of age or older.

There were 2,921 housing units, of which 12.5% were vacant. The homeowner vacancy rate was 1.7% and the rental vacancy rate was 8.4%.

Racial composition as of the 2020 census
Race	Number	Percent
White	4,917	84.4%
Black or African American	138	2.4%
American Indian and Alaska Native	12	0.2%
Asian	82	1.4%
Native Hawaiian and Other Pacific Islander	0	0.0%
Some other race	170	2.9%
Two or more races	509	8.7%
Hispanic or Latino (of any race)	670	11.5%

=== 2000 census ===
As of the 2000 census, there were 3,858 people, 1,638 households, and 1,187 families residing in the CDP. The population density was 1,729.8 inhabitants per square mile (667.9/km^{2}). There were 1,840 housing units at an average density of 825.0 per square mile (318.5/km^{2}). The racial makeup of the CDP was 95.70% White, 0.78% African American, 0.44% Native American, 1.40% Asian, 0.10% Pacific Islander, 0.34% from other races, and 1.24% from two or more races. Hispanic or Latino of any race were 3.55% of the population.

There were 1,638 households, out of which 22.8% had children under the age of 18 living with them, 62.6% were married couples living together, 7.6% had a female householder with no husband present, and 27.5% were non-families. 21.7% of all households were made up of individuals, and 11.5% had someone living alone who was 65 years of age or older. The average household size was 2.36 and the average family size was 2.73.

In the CDP, the population was spread out, with 18.3% under the age of 18, 5.5% from 18 to 24, 20.3% from 25 to 44, 31.0% from 45 to 64, and 24.9% who were 65 years of age or older. The median age was 48 years. For every 100 females, there were 92.5 males. For every 100 females age 18 and over, there were 89.2 males.

The median income for a household in the CDP was $50,987, and the median income for a family was $56,250. Males had a median income of $39,430 versus $30,366 for females. The per capita income for the CDP was $30,763. About 1.2% of families and 3.2% of the population were below the poverty line, including 3.4% of those under age 18 and 2.1% of those age 65 or over.
