= Burnt Store Marina, Florida =

- Census-designated place
- Location in Lee County and the state of Florida
- Coordinates: 26°45′52″N 82°03′07″W
- Country: United States
- State: Florida
- County: Lee

Area
  - Total: 1.36 sq mi (3.51 km^{2})
  - Land: 1.07 sq mi (2.76 km^{2})
  - Water: 0.29 sq mi (0.76 km^{2})
- Elevation: 10 ft (3.0 m)

Population (2020)
  - Total: 1,890
  - Density: 1,774.7/sq mi (685.21/km^{2})
- Time zone: UTC-5 (Eastern (EST))
  - Summer (DST): UTC-4 (EDT)
- ZIP code: 33955
- Area code: 941
- FIPS code: 12-09612
- GNIS feature ID: 2402735

Burnt Store Marina is an unincorporated community and census-designated place (CDP) in Lee County, Florida, United States. The population was 1,890 at the 2020 census, up from 1,793 at the 2010 census. It is part of the Cape Coral-Fort Myers, Florida Metropolitan Statistical Area.

== Geography ==
Burnt Store Marina is located in northwestern Lee County. It is bordered to the south by the city of Cape Coral and to the north by Charlotte County. The west side of the community fronts on Charlotte Harbor, and the east side follows Burnt Store Road. It is 20 miles (32 km) northwest of Fort Myers, the Lee county seat, and 13 miles (21 km) south of Punta Gorda.

According to the United States Census Bureau, the CDP has a total area of 1.4 square miles (3.5 km^{2}), of which 1.1 square miles (2.8 km^{2}) are land and 0.3 square miles (0.8 km^{2}), or 21.50%, are water.

== Demographics ==
Historical population
Census	Pop.	Note	%±
2000	1,271		—
2010	1,793		41.1%
2020	1,890		5.4%
U.S. Decennial Census

=== 2020 census ===
As of the 2020 census, Burnt Store Marina had a population of 1,890. The median age was 71.3 years. 0.8% of residents were under the age of 18 and 74.5% of residents were 65 years of age or older. For every 100 females there were 95.0 males, and for every 100 females age 18 and over there were 94.6 males age 18 and over.

100.0% of residents lived in urban areas, while 0.0% lived in rural areas.

There were 1,044 households in Burnt Store Marina, of which 2.7% had children under the age of 18 living in them. Of all households, 70.6% were married-couple households, 10.2% were households with a male householder and no spouse or partner present, and 15.5% were households with a female householder and no spouse or partner present. About 23.6% of all households were made up of individuals and 19.6% had someone living alone who was 65 years of age or older.

There were 1,850 housing units, of which 43.6% were vacant. The homeowner vacancy rate was 3.2% and the rental vacancy rate was 41.8%.

Racial composition as of the 2020 census
Race	Number	Percent
White	1,814	96.0%
Black or African American	0	0.0%
American Indian and Alaska Native	1	0.1%
Asian	9	0.5%
Native Hawaiian and Other Pacific Islander	0	0.0%
Some other race	9	0.5%
Two or more races	57	3.0%
Hispanic or Latino (of any race)	49	2.6%

=== 2000 census ===
As of the census of 2000, there were 1,271 people, 672 households, and 534 families residing in the CDP. The population density was 1,040.9 inhabitants per square mile (401.9/km^{2}). There were 1,176 housing units at an average density of 963.1 per square mile (371.9/km^{2}). The racial makeup of the CDP was 98.51% White, 0.94% African American, 0.08% Native American, 0.16% Asian, and 0.31% from two or more races. Hispanic or Latino of any race were 0.94% of the population.

There were 672 households, out of which 2.1% had children under the age of 18 living with them, 78.3% were married couples living together, 0.7% had a female householder with no husband present, and 20.4% were non-families. 17.9% of all households were made up of individuals, and 11.3% had someone living alone who was 65 years of age or older. The average household size was 1.89 and the average family size was 2.09.

In the CDP, the population was spread out, with 1.9% under the age of 18, 0.6% from 18 to 24, 4.2% from 25 to 44, 51.5% from 45 to 64, and 41.8% who were 65 years of age or older. The median age was 63 years. For every 100 females, there were 97.7 males. For every 100 females age 18 and over, there were 97.6 males.

The median income for a household in the CDP was $61,786, and the median income for a family was $68,542. Males had a median income of $31,750 versus $17,163 for females. The per capita income for the CDP was $46,050. About 3.4% of families and 3.6% of the population were below the poverty line, including none of those under the age of eighteen or over sixty-five.
