= Harlem Heights, Florida =

- Census-designated place
- Location in Lee County and the state of Florida
- Coordinates: 26°24′32″N 80°03′51″W
- Country: United States
- State: Florida
- County: Lee

Area
  - Total: 0.79 sq mi (2.05 km^{2})
  - Land: 0.65 sq mi (1.68 km^{2})
  - Water: 0.14 sq mi (0.37 km^{2})
- Elevation: 3 ft (0.91 m)

Population (2020)
  - Total: 1,930
  - Density: 2,981.9/sq mi (1,151.33/km^{2})
- Time zone: UTC-5 (Eastern (EST))
  - Summer (DST): UTC-4 (EDT)
- ZIP code: 33908
- Area code: 239
- FIPS code: 12-28937
- GNIS feature ID: 2402568

Harlem Heights is an unincorporated community and census-designated place (CDP) in Lee County, Florida, United States. The population was 1,930 at the 2020 census, down from 1,975 at the 2010 census. It is part of the Cape Coral-Fort Myers, Florida Metropolitan Statistical Area.

== Geography ==
Harlem Heights is located southwest of the center of Lee County. It is bordered to the west, across Pine Ridge Road, by the Iona CDP. Gladiolus Drive is the main east-west road across the community. It is 10 miles (16 km) south of the center of Fort Myers and 6 miles (10 km) north of Fort Myers Beach. According to the United States Census Bureau, the Harlem Heights CDP has a total area of 0.77 square miles (2.0 km^{2}), of which 0.66 square miles (1.7 km^{2}) are land and 0.2 square miles (0.4 km^{2}), or 18.14%, are water.

== Demographics ==
Historical population
| Census | Pop. | Note | %± |
|---|---|---|---|
| 2000 | 1,065 | | — |
| 2010 | 1,975 | | 85.4% |
| 2020 | 1,930 | | −2.3% |
U.S. Decennial Census

=== 2020 census ===
As of the 2020 census, Harlem Heights had a population of 1,930. The median age was 27.5 years. 32.0% of residents were under the age of 18 and 8.3% of residents were 65 years of age or older. For every 100 females there were 94.2 males, and for every 100 females age 18 and over there were 87.3 males age 18 and over.

100.0% of residents lived in urban areas, while 0.0% lived in rural areas.

There were 588 households in Harlem Heights, of which 43.2% had children under the age of 18 living in them. Of all households, 33.0% were married-couple households, 19.4% were households with a male householder and no spouse or partner present, and 37.9% were households with a female householder and no spouse or partner present. About 23.0% of all households were made up of individuals and 7.0% had someone living alone who was 65 years of age or older.

There were 650 housing units, of which 9.5% were vacant. The homeowner vacancy rate was 0.0% and the rental vacancy rate was 10.0%.

Racial composition as of the 2020 census
| Race | Number | Percent |
|---|---|---|
| White | 431 | 22.3% |
| Black or African American | 466 | 24.1% |
| American Indian and Alaska Native | 13 | 0.7% |
| Asian | 16 | 0.8% |
| Native Hawaiian and Other Pacific Islander | 2 | 0.1% |
| Some other race | 539 | 27.9% |
| Two or more races | 463 | 24.0% |
| Hispanic or Latino (of any race) | 1,211 | 62.7% |

=== 2000 census ===
As of the census of 2000, there were 1,065 people, 303 households, and 236 families residing in the CDP. The population density was 1,341.4 inhabitants per square mile (517.9/km^{2}). There were 402 housing units at an average density of 506.3 per square mile (195.5/km^{2}). The racial makeup of the CDP was 42.72% White, 36.06% African American, 0.38% Asian, 16.71% from other races, and 4.13% from two or more races. Hispanic or Latino of any race were 55.02% of the population.

There were 303 households, out of which 40.3% had children under the age of 18 living with them, 39.3% were married couples living together, 33.7% had a female householder with no husband present, and 22.1% were non-families. 16.8% of all households were made up of individuals, and 3.0% had someone living alone who was 65 years of age or older. The average household size was 3.51 and the average family size was 3.92.

In the CDP, the population was spread out, with 33.6% under the age of 18, 10.3% from 18 to 24, 29.7% from 25 to 44, 18.5% from 45 to 64, and 7.9% who were 65 years of age or older. The median age was 29 years. For every 100 females, there were 100.9 males. For every 100 females age 18 and over, there were 91.6 males.

The median income for a household in the CDP was $28,611, and the median income for a family was $27,056. Males had a median income of $22,826 versus $20,000 for females. The per capita income for the CDP was $8,963. About 27.4% of families and 27.5% of the population were below the poverty line, including 35.3% of those under age 18 and 18.2% of those age 65 or over.
