= Punta Rassa, Florida =

- Census-designated place
- Location in Lee County and the state of Florida
- Coordinates: 26°30′03″N 82°00′10″W
- Country: United States
- State: Florida
- County: Lee

Area
  - Total: 4.47 sq mi (11.57 km^{2})
  - Land: 2.39 sq mi (6.19 km^{2})
  - Water: 2.08 sq mi (5.39 km^{2})
- Elevation: 0 ft (0 m)

Population (2020)
  - Total: 1,620
  - Density: 678.3/sq mi (261.89/km^{2})
- Time zone: UTC−5 (Eastern (EST))
  - Summer (DST): UTC−4 (EDT)
- ZIP code: 33908
- Area code: 239
- FIPS code: 12-59250
- GNIS feature ID: 2403455

Punta Rassa is an unincorporated community and census-designated place (CDP) in Lee County, Florida, United States. The population was 1,620 at the 2020 census, down from 1,750 at the 2010 census. It is part of the Cape Coral-Fort Myers, Florida Metropolitan Statistical Area.

== Geography ==
Punta Rassa is located in southwestern Lee County at the west end of a peninsula bordered to the north by the Caloosahatchee River, to the west by San Carlos Bay, and to the south by the Gulf of Mexico. The community sits at the east end of the Sanibel Causeway, which crosses San Carlos Bay to Sanibel Island. McGregor Boulevard (County Road 867) forms the southern edge of the community; the highway leads northeast 15 miles (24 km) to Fort Myers, the Lee county seat. Punta Rassa is bordered to the east by the unincorporated community of Iona.

According to the United States Census Bureau, the Punta Rassa CDP has a total area of 4.5 square miles (11.6 km^{2}), of which 2.4 square miles (6.2 km^{2}) are land and 2.1 square miles (5.4 km^{2}), or 46.55%, are water.

== History ==
The location was named Punta Rasca (Spanish for "smooth or flat point" and later corrupted to "Punta Rassa") by the Spanish Conquistadors in the mid-16th century, who unloaded cattle in the area.

By the middle of the 18th century, fishermen from Cuba had established permanent fishing stations, called ranchos, along the southwest Florida coast from Tampa Bay to San Carlos Bay. The Spanish Cubans would stay in Florida from September until March drying and salting fish caught along the coast to supply Havana. Native Americans living in the area, possibly Calusa at first, and later Seminole, worked seasonally at the ranchos, staying on in the area during the off-season (see Spanish Indians). Dr. Benjamin Strobel visited a rancho at Punta Rassa in 1833, where he found ten or so wood-framed houses. "Ponte Rasa" was named as a "rancho" in an 1835 letter from William Buner (presumably William Bunce) to Wiley Thompson.

=== Seminole Wars ===
During the Second Seminole War, and again between 1855 and 1858 (Billy Bowlegs war), Punta Rassa was in the theater of war during the Seminole Wars. As a result, Fort Dulany (also spelled "Dulaney", "Delany" and "Delaney") was built there after January 1838 as an army supply depot, with a hospital. The fort was abandoned the next year (see the Battle of the Caloosahatchee), and then re-occupied in 1841, when it was used to hold Seminole prisoners before they were sent west to the Indian Territory. A hurricane destroyed Fort Dulany in October 1841. Army operations were moved up the Caloosahatchee River to a site named Fort Harvie. Fort Harvie was abandoned in 1842. After a white trader was killed by Seminoles on the Peace River in 1849 (see Paynes Creek incident), the Army returned to the Caloosahatchee River in 1850. The new Fort Myers was built on the burned ruins of Fort Harvie. Fort Dulany was reopened during the Third Seminole War, in 1856, and then closed again in 1858.

=== Civil War ===
Southwest Florida was relatively quiet in the early part of the Civil War. Union troops and refugee Union sympathizers occupied Useppa Island in December 1863 and mounted a small raid into Charlotte Harbor and up the Myakka River, which resulted in some skirmishes with Confederate troops and irregulars. In January 1864, Union troops landed at Punta Rassa and marched overland to Fort Myers, which they were able to seize before Confederate sympathizers could burn it. The troops on Useppa Island then moved to Fort Myers. As the year progressed, Union troops and sympathizers began driving cattle to Punta Rassa to supply Union ships on blockade duty and Union-held Key West, reducing the supply of cattle available to Confederate forces. The increased shipping from Punta Rassa led the Union Army to build a barracks and a wharf there. The barracks was 50 by 100 feet (15 by 30 m), set on 14-foot-tall (4.3 m) pilings to place the building above storm surges. At the end of the Civil War, the U.S. military withdrew from the area.

=== Telegraph ===
In 1866, the newly formed International Ocean Telegraph Company (IOTC) received from the U.S. government, the state of Florida and the government of Spain the exclusive right to operate an underseas telegraph cable between Florida and Cuba. In 1867, the IOTC constructed a telegraph line from Lake City, where it connected with the national telegraph network via Western Union, to Punta Rassa, where the underwater cable would come ashore. The underwater cable was laid from Havana to Key West, and then on to Punta Rassa, and the line opened to public use on September 11, 1867. The U.S. Congress had, in 1866, authorized telegraph companies to run their lines across, take supplies from, and place stations on federal public domain lands without charge. The IOTC placed its office in one room of the now abandoned barracks at Fort Dulaney, while the station agent lived in another room.

=== Cattle port ===
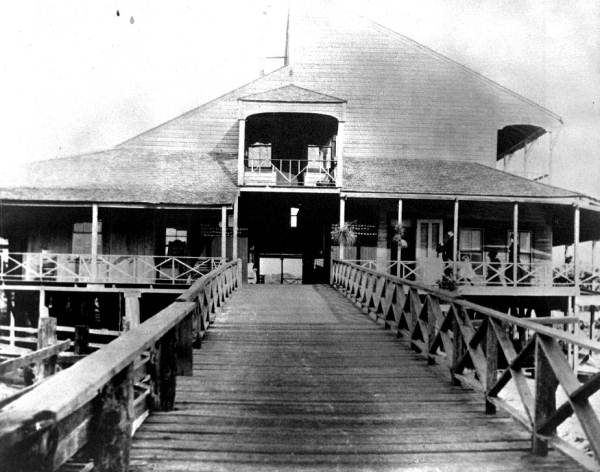
Pre-1906 photo of the "Barracks", also known as the Tarpon House, at Punta Rassa, Florida

Punta Rassa became a thriving cattle shipping town in the later 1800s. The first cattle drive to Punta Rassa had been in 1833, when P. B. Prior purchased ten cattle and some calves from Seminoles living near the Peace River in what is now Hardee County, and drove them to Punta Rassa, possibly for transport to Sanibel Island. Florida cattlemen began shipping cattle to Cuba after the end of the Third Seminole War. Shipments at first were made from Tampa, and then from Fort Ogden and Punta Gorda on the Peace River. Cattle shipments to Cuba were curtailed, but not completely stopped, by the Union blockade of Florida during the Civil War. After the war ended, shipments of cattle from the Peace River ports resumed to Cuba, to Savannah, Georgia, and to Charleston, South Carolina. Some of the cattle shipments to Cuba were made out of Punta Rassa starting in 1869, and by 1872, 18,000 out of a little more than 21,000 cattle shipped from Florida to Cuba went through Punta Rassa.

Most cattle drives in Florida were relatively small and short. Three or four hundred steers would be driven by three to five cowboys for 100 miles (160 km) or so from the open range of central Florida to Punta Rassa. A few cattle drives were larger, up to 1,500 cattle moved by ten or so cowboys. The longest drives were 300 miles (480 km), from Fernandina, by the Georgia border, to Punta Rassa. Water was a problem; too much during the wet season, not enough in the dry season. In the dry season, the cowboys might have to rope alligators to pull them out of water holes so that the cattle could safely drink.

The International Ocean Telegraph Company controlled the wharf that had been part of Fort Dulaney, and for many years, charged 15 cents a head for cattle loaded on ships from the wharf. Francis A. Hendry later built pens and a wharf at Punta Rassa and charged 10 cents a head for cattle shipped from his wharf. Another cattleman, Jake Summerlin, who had owned holding pens at Punta Rassa since 1868, built a hotel (the Summerlin House) in 1874. When the hotel was full, cowboys would camp out under the building. Summerlin bought Hendry's pens and wharf for $10,000 in 1878.

Cattle would be loaded at the port onto ships destined for Cuba. It was one of the home bases for the "King of the Cracker Cowboys" Jake Summerlin, who by the time he was 40, was one of the wealthiest of the Florida cattle barons. The town of Punta Rassa was lined with wooden buildings, including a hotel and several bars, which were frequented by the many merchants and cattle sellers.

=== Sport fishing and tourism ===
In the 1880s, the area became known as a great sport fishing area and was frequented by the wealthy, who came in search of the prized tarpon sport fish. Soon, however, visitors relocated to Boca Grande, 70 miles (110 km) north of Punta Rassa by land after the Charlotte Harbor and Northern Railway was completed to that destination. Although the distance seems great, these areas are only separated by approximately 25 miles (40 km) of water.

A railroad line was built towards Punta Rassa in the early 1920s by the Seaboard Air Line Railroad as part of an effort by Seaboard president S. Davies Warfield to reestablish a deepwater port at Punta Rassa. The 8-mile (13 km) rail line branched off the Seaboard's main line at Punta Rassa Junction in South Fort Myers (located at Six Mile Cypress Parkway's crossing of the Ten Mile Canal). It ran through where Lakes Park currently sits, and then roughly paralleled what is now Summerlin Road, terminating just east of Punta Rassa at Truckland. Due to their financial state, the Seaboard Air Line Railroad discontinued all operations in the Fort Myers area in 1952. Despite never fully reaching Punta Rassa, the abandoned line is still referred to as Seaboard's Punta Rassa Subdivision. An FPL transmission line currently sits on a portion of the rail line's former right of way just south of Summerlin Road.

The area figured prominently in the 1984 historical novel A Land Remembered, by Patrick D. Smith.

== Demographics ==
Historical population
Census	Pop.	Note	%±
1990	1,493		—
2000	1,731		15.9%
2010	1,750		1.1%
2020	1,620		−7.4%
U.S. Decennial Census

=== 2020 census ===
As of the 2020 census, Punta Rassa had a population of 1,620. The median age was 80.0 years. 1.5% of residents were under the age of 18 and 89.1% of residents were 65 years of age or older. For every 100 females there were 68.0 males, and for every 100 females age 18 and over there were 67.9 males age 18 and over.

99.7% of residents lived in urban areas, while 0.3% lived in rural areas.

There were 997 households in Punta Rassa, of which 1.4% had children under the age of 18 living in them. Of all households, 44.1% were married-couple households, 14.6% were households with a male householder and no spouse or partner present, and 39.9% were households with a female householder and no spouse or partner present. About 53.8% of all households were made up of individuals and 51.3% had someone living alone who was 65 years of age or older.

There were 1,583 housing units, of which 37.0% were vacant. The homeowner vacancy rate was 0.2% and the rental vacancy rate was 7.4%.

Racial composition as of the 2020 census
Race	Number	Percent
White	1,570	96.9%
Black or African American	0	0.0%
American Indian and Alaska Native	0	0.0%
Asian	13	0.8%
Native Hawaiian and Other Pacific Islander	0	0.0%
Some other race	11	0.7%
Two or more races	26	1.6%
Hispanic or Latino (of any race)	5	0.3%

=== 2000 census ===
As of the 2000 census, there were 1,731 people, 1,015 households, and 481 families residing in the CDP. The population density was 734.8 inhabitants per square mile (283.7/km^{2}). There were 1,372 housing units at an average density of 582.4 per square mile (224.9/km^{2}). The racial makeup of the CDP was 99.25% White, 0.35% African American, 0.12% Native American, 0.17% Asian, 0.06% from other races, and 0.06% from two or more races. Hispanic or Latino of any race were 0.23% of the population.

There were 1,015 households, out of which 1.5% had children under the age of 18 living with them, 46.7% were married couples living together, 0.5% had a female householder with no husband present, and 52.6% were non-families. 52.0% of all households were made up of individuals, and 48.7% had someone living alone who was 65 years of age or older. The average household size was 1.53 and the average family size was 2.09.

In the CDP, the age distribution of the population shows 1.5% under the age of 18, 0.5% from 18 to 24, 2.8% from 25 to 44, 12.8% from 45 to 64, and 82.5% who were 65 years of age or older. The median age was 80 years. For every 100 females, there were 63.9 males. For every 100 females age 18 and over, there were 64.3 males.

The median income for a household in the CDP was $44,583, and the median income for a family was $66,912. Males had a median income of $73,333 versus $19,583 for females. The per capita income for the CDP was $39,048. None of the families and 1.9% of the population was living below the poverty line, including no under eighteens and 1.3% of those over 64.
