= Iona, Florida =

- Census-designated place
- Location in Lee County and the state of Florida
- Coordinates: 26°30′23″N 81°57′37″W
- Country: United States
- State: Florida
- County: Lee

Area
  - Total: 10.23 sq mi (26.50 km^{2})
  - Land: 6.63 sq mi (17.16 km^{2})
  - Water: 3.61 sq mi (9.34 km^{2})
- Elevation: 7 ft (2.1 m)

Population (2020)
  - Total: 16,908
  - Density: 2,551.7/sq mi (985.22/km^{2})
- Time zone: UTC-5 (Eastern (EST))
  - Summer (DST): UTC-4 (EDT)
- FIPS code: 12-34012
- GNIS feature ID: 2402620

Iona is an unincorporated community and census-designated place (CDP) in Lee County, Florida, United States. The population was 16,908 at the 2020 census, up from 15,404 at the 2010 census. It is part of the Cape Coral-Fort Myers, Florida Metropolitan Statistical Area.

A strong EF2 tornado struck the town on January 16, 2022, causing major damage and injuring three people.

== Geography ==
Iona is located in southwestern Lee County. It is bordered to the west by Punta Rassa, to the east by Harlem Heights, and to the northeast by McGregor. Its northern boundary is the tidal Caloosahatchee River, across which is the city of Cape Coral. The southern edge of the community is Summerlin Road (County Road 869). McGregor Boulevard crosses the community from northeast to southwest. Iona is 4 miles (6 km) northeast of the causeway to Sanibel Island and 11 miles (18 km) southwest of the center of Fort Myers.

According to the United States Census Bureau, the Iona CDP has a total area of 10.2 square miles (26.5 km^{2}), of which 6.6 square miles (17.1 km^{2}) are land and 3.6 square miles (9.4 km^{2}), or 35.32%, are water, primarily in the Caloosahatchee River estuary.

== Demographics ==
Historical population
Census	Pop.	Note	%±
1990	9,565		—
2000	11,756		22.9%
2010	15,404		31.0%
2020	16,908		9.8%

=== 2020 census ===
As of the 2020 census, Iona had a population of 16,908. The median age was 67.6 years. 6.5% of residents were under the age of 18 and 55.6% of residents were 65 years of age or older. For every 100 females there were 90.6 males, and for every 100 females age 18 and over there were 89.4 males age 18 and over.

100.0% of residents lived in urban areas, while 0.0% lived in rural areas.

There were 8,798 households in Iona, of which 7.5% had children under the age of 18 living in them. Of all households, 50.2% were married-couple households, 17.9% were households with a male householder and no spouse or partner present, and 27.2% were households with a female householder and no spouse or partner present. About 36.7% of all households were made up of individuals and 24.0% had someone living alone who was 65 years of age or older.

There were 13,876 housing units, of which 36.6% were vacant. The homeowner vacancy rate was 2.2% and the rental vacancy rate was 15.4%.

Racial composition as of the 2020 census
Race	Number	Percent
White	15,299	90.5%
Black or African American	171	1.0%
American Indian and Alaska Native	22	0.1%
Asian	185	1.1%
Native Hawaiian and Other Pacific Islander	5	0.0%
Some other race	394	2.3%
Two or more races	832	4.9%
Hispanic or Latino (of any race)	1,078	6.4%

=== 2000 census ===
As of the census of 2000, there were 11,756 people, 6,023 households, and 3,740 families residing in the CDP. The population density was 1,648.5 inhabitants per square mile (636.5/km^{2}). There were 9,290 housing units at an average density of 1,302.7 per square mile (503.0/km^{2}). The racial makeup of the CDP was 97.47% White, 0.41% African American, 0.17% Native American, 0.48% Asian, 0.01% Pacific Islander, 0.83% from other races, and 0.63% from two or more races. Hispanic or Latino of any race were 3.94% of the population.

There were 6,023 households, out of which 11.2% had children under the age of 18 living with them, 54.9% were married couples living together, 5.1% had a female householder with no husband present, and 37.9% were non-families. 31.4% of all households were made up of individuals, and 17.0% had someone living alone who was 65 years of age or older. The average household size was 1.95 and the average family size was 2.36.

In the CDP, the population was spread out, with 10.2% under the age of 18, 3.6% from 18 to 24, 17.6% from 25 to 44, 29.1% from 45 to 64, and 39.5% who were 65 years of age or older. The median age was 59 years. For every 100 females, there were 91.5 males. For every 100 females age 18 and over, there were 90.2 males.

The median income for a household in the CDP was $37,091, and the median income for a family was $46,250. Males had a median income of $34,740 versus $25,683 for females. The per capita income for the CDP was $33,937. About 5.9% of families and 10.0% of the population were below the poverty line, including 17.6% of those under age 18 and 4.7% of those age 65 or over.
