= Cypress Lake, Florida =

- Census-designated place
- Location in Lee County and the state of Florida
- Coordinates: 26°32′21″N 81°54′00″W
- Country: United States
- State: Florida
- County: Lee

Area
  - Total: 4.00 sq mi (10.37 km^{2})
  - Land: 3.83 sq mi (9.92 km^{2})
  - Water: 0.17 sq mi (0.45 km^{2})
- Elevation: 3 ft (0.91 m)

Population (2020)
  - Total: 13,727
  - Density: 3,582.9/sq mi (1,383.37/km^{2})
- Time zone: UTC-5 (Eastern (EST))
  - Summer (DST): UTC-4 (EDT)
- FIPS code: 12-16062
- GNIS feature ID: 2402395

Cypress Lake is an unincorporated community and census-designated place (CDP) in Lee County, Florida, United States. The population was 13,727 at the 2020 census. It is part of the Cape Coral-Fort Myers, Florida Metropolitan Statistical Area.

== Geography ==
Cypress Lake is located in central Lee County. It is bordered to the west by McGregor, to the north by Whiskey Creek, and to the east by Villas, all unincorporated communities that are census-designated places. It is 7 miles (11 km) south of Fort Myers, the county seat.

According to the United States Census Bureau, the Cypress Lake CDP has a total area of 4.0 square miles (10.4 km^{2}), of which 3.9 square miles (10.0 km^{2}) are land and 0.2 square miles (0.4 km^{2}), or 4.28%, are water.

== Demographics ==
Historical population
Census	Pop.	Note	%±
1980	8,721		—
1990	10,491		20.3%
2000	12,072		15.1%
2010	11,846		−1.9%
2020	13,727		15.9%

=== 2020 census ===
As of the 2020 census, Cypress Lake had a population of 13,727. The median age was 60.2 years. 9.9% of residents were under the age of 18 and 41.6% of residents were 65 years of age or older. For every 100 females there were 81.3 males, and for every 100 females age 18 and over there were 78.3 males age 18 and over.

100.0% of residents lived in urban areas, while 0.0% lived in rural areas.

There were 7,180 households in Cypress Lake, of which 12.3% had children under the age of 18 living in them. Of all households, 37.9% were married-couple households, 18.0% were households with a male householder and no spouse or partner present, and 37.3% were households with a female householder and no spouse or partner present. About 42.1% of all households were made up of individuals and 25.5% had someone living alone who was 65 years of age or older.

There were 9,306 housing units, of which 22.8% were vacant. The homeowner vacancy rate was 2.1% and the rental vacancy rate was 9.9%.

Racial composition as of the 2020 census
Race	Number	Percent
White	11,395	83.0%
Black or African American	370	2.7%
American Indian and Alaska Native	37	0.3%
Asian	446	3.2%
Native Hawaiian and Other Pacific Islander	3	0.0%
Some other race	501	3.6%
Two or more races	975	7.1%
Hispanic or Latino (of any race)	1,405	10.2%

=== 2000 census ===
As of the 2000 census, there were 12,072 people, 6,348 households, and 3,548 families residing in the CDP. The population density was 3,035.7 inhabitants per square mile (1,172.1/km^{2}). There were 7,994 housing units at an average density of 2,010.2 per square mile (776.1/km^{2}). The racial makeup of the CDP was 96.66% White, 1.04% African American, 0.12% Native American, 0.62% Asian, 0.03% Pacific Islander, 0.55% from other races, and 0.97% from two or more races. Hispanic or Latino of any race were 3.62% of the population.

There were 6,348 households, out of which 12.8% had children under the age of 18 living with them, 47.1% were married couples living together, 6.7% had a female householder with no husband present, and 44.1% were non-families. 38.2% of all households were made up of individuals, and 21.1% had someone living alone who was 65 years of age or older. The average household size was 1.89 and the average family size was 2.42.

In the CDP, the population was spread out, with 11.7% under the age of 18, 4.3% from 18 to 24, 19.5% from 25 to 44, 25.3% from 45 to 64, and 39.2% who were 65 years of age or older. The median age was 57 years. For every 100 females, there were 82.3 males. For every 100 females age 18 and over, there were 78.8 males.

The median income for a household in the CDP was $35,405, and the median income for a family was $45,605. Males had a median income of $31,663 versus $25,958 for females. The per capita income for the CDP was $22,799. About 4.4% of families and 7.2% of the population were below the poverty line, including 12.1% of those under age 18 and 5.0% of those age 65 or over.

== Education ==
Public K-12 schools in Cypress Lake are operated by the School District of Lee County. Cypress Lake is home to Cypress Lake High School and Cypress Lake Middle School. The community is also the location of the main campus of Florida SouthWestern State College. Students also have the option of attending Canterbury School, a private college preparatory school. Additionally, the community also has three pre-schools: Bright Beginnings Early School located within Cypress Lake United Methodist Church, Growing Room Child Development Center, located at the southern end of the community, and ABC Learning Center.
