= McGregor, Florida =

- Census-designated place
- Location in Lee County and the state of Florida
- Coordinates: 26°33′40″N 81°54′48″W
- Country: United States
- State: Florida
- County: Lee

Area
  - Total: 4.07 sq mi (10.54 km^{2})
  - Land: 2.37 sq mi (6.13 km^{2})
  - Water: 1.70 sq mi (4.41 km^{2})
- Elevation: 0 ft (0 m)

Population (2020)
  - Total: 7,976
  - Density: 3,371.5/sq mi (1,301.74/km^{2})
- Time zone: UTC-5 (Eastern (EST))
  - Summer (DST): UTC-4 (EDT)
- ZIP code: 33919
- Area code: 239
- FIPS code: 12-42090
- GNIS feature ID: 2403269

McGregor is a census-designated place (CDP) in Lee County, Florida, United States. The population was 7,976 at the 2020 census, up from 7,406 at the 2010 census. It is part of the Cape Coral-Fort Myers, Florida Metropolitan Statistical Area.

== Geography ==
McGregor is located in central Lee County in an unincorporated part of the county. It is bordered to the east by Whiskey Creek, to the southeast by Cypress Lake, and to the southwest by Iona, all unincorporated. McGregor is bordered to the northwest by the tidal Caloosahatchee River, across which is the city of Cape Coral. The Cape Coral Bridge crosses the Caloosahatchee River from McGregor.

Florida State Road 867 (McGregor Boulevard) is the main road through the community. It leads northeast 6 miles (10 km) to the center of Fort Myers, the Lee county seat, and southwest 4 miles (6 km) to San Carlos Boulevard in Iona.

According to the United States Census Bureau, the McGregor CDP has a total area of 4.1 square miles (10.5 km^{2}), of which 2.4 square miles (6.1 km^{2}) are land and 1.7 square miles (4.4 km^{2}), or 41.86%, are water.

== Demographics ==
Historical population
Census	Pop.	Note	%±
1990	6,504		—
2000	7,136		9.7%
2010	7,406		3.8%
2020	7,976		7.7%

=== 2020 census ===
As of the 2020 census, McGregor had a population of 7,976. The median age was 56.7 years. 13.1% of residents were under the age of 18 and 36.0% of residents were 65 years of age or older. For every 100 females there were 90.9 males, and for every 100 females age 18 and over there were 90.4 males age 18 and over.

100.0% of residents lived in urban areas, while 0.0% lived in rural areas.

There were 3,795 households in McGregor, of which 16.5% had children under the age of 18 living in them. Of all households, 53.0% were married-couple households, 15.0% were households with a male householder and no spouse or partner present, and 24.8% were households with a female householder and no spouse or partner present. About 29.7% of all households were made up of individuals and 16.3% had someone living alone who was 65 years of age or older.

There were 4,736 housing units, of which 19.9% were vacant. The homeowner vacancy rate was 2.1% and the rental vacancy rate was 8.2%.

Racial composition as of the 2020 census
Race	Number	Percent
White	6,909	86.6%
Black or African American	164	2.1%
American Indian and Alaska Native	15	0.2%
Asian	170	2.1%
Native Hawaiian and Other Pacific Islander	4	0.1%
Some other race	174	2.2%
Two or more races	540	6.8%
Hispanic or Latino (of any race)	627	7.9%

=== 2000 census ===
As of the census of 2000, there were 7,136 people, 3,295 households, and 2,296 families residing in the CDP. The population density was 2,784.1 inhabitants per square mile (1,074.9/km^{2}). There were 3,982 housing units at an average density of 1,553.6 per square mile (599.8/km^{2}). The racial makeup of the CDP was 96.09% White, 0.84% African American, 0.20% Native American, 1.56% Asian, 0.39% from other races, and 0.92% from two or more races. Hispanic or Latino of any race were 2.91% of the population.

There were 3,295 households, out of which 17.8% had children under the age of 18 living with them, 62.0% were married couples living together, 5.7% had a female householder with no husband present, and 30.3% were non-families. 25.0% of all households were made up of individuals, and 13.7% had someone living alone who was 65 years of age or older. The average household size was 2.17 and the average family size was 2.55.

In the CDP, the population was spread out, with 15.0% under the age of 18, 3.3% from 18 to 24, 19.2% from 25 to 44, 31.9% from 45 to 64, and 30.6% who were 65 years of age or older. The median age was 53 years. For every 100 females, there were 92.3 males. For every 100 females age 18 and over, there were 89.8 males.

The median income for a household in the CDP was $57,628, and the median income for a family was $67,353. Males had a median income of $52,151 versus $31,732 for females. The per capita income for the CDP was $45,240. About 1.3% of families and 3.3% of the population were below the poverty line, including 2.7% of those under age 18 and 2.6% of those age 65 or over.
