= Villas, Florida =

- Census-designated place
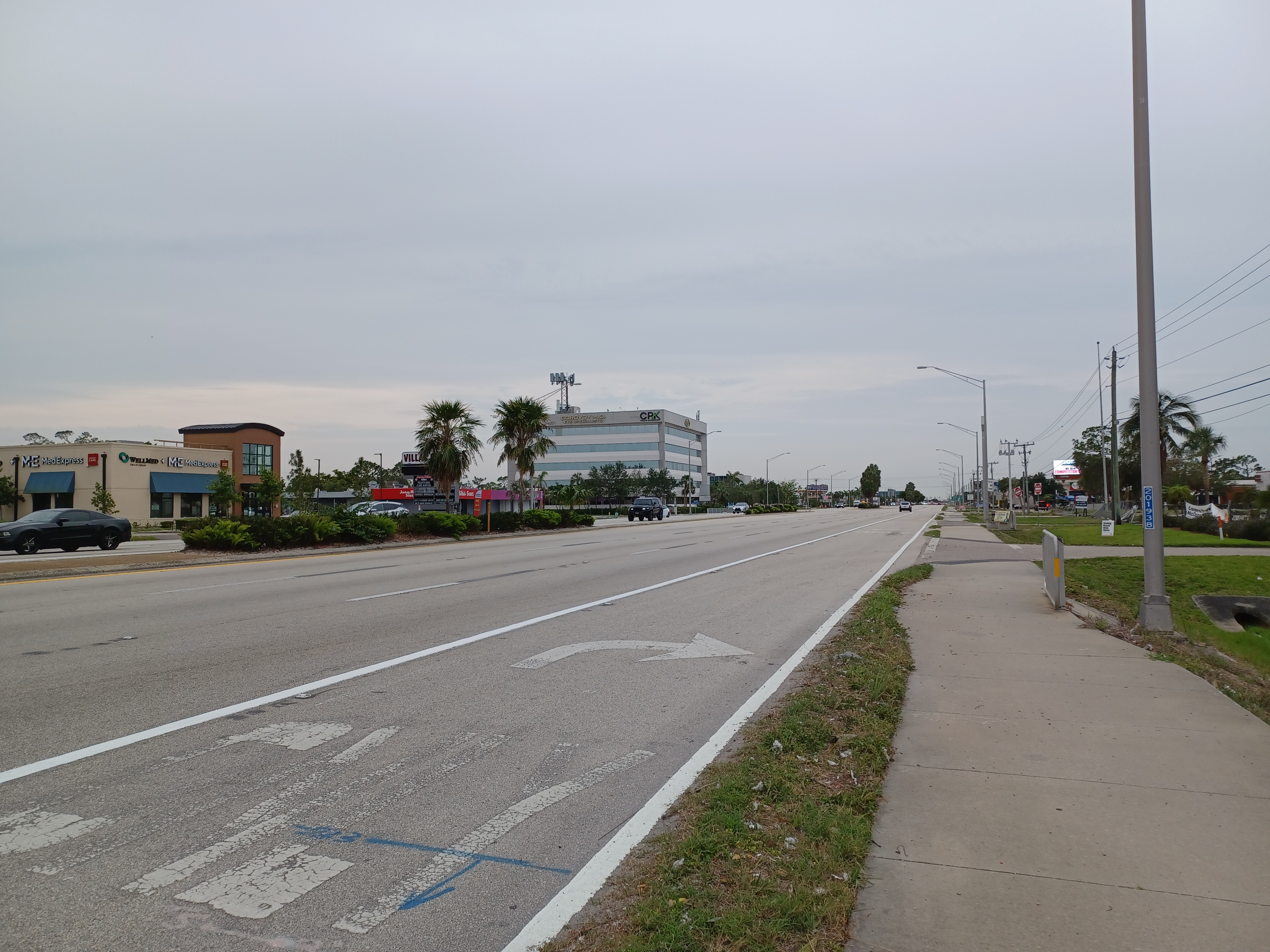
- US Route 41 in Villas

- Location in Lee County and the state of Florida
- Coordinates: 26°33′08″N 81°52′26″W
- Country: United States
- State: Florida
- County: Lee

Area
  - Total: 4.85 sq mi (12.56 km^{2})
  - Land: 4.63 sq mi (11.98 km^{2})
  - Water: 0.22 sq mi (0.58 km^{2})
- Elevation: 10 ft (3.0 m)

Population (2020)
  - Total: 12,687
  - Density: 2,742.9/sq mi (1,059.04/km^{2})
- Time zone: UTC-5 (Eastern (EST))
  - Summer (DST): UTC-4 (EDT)
- FIPS code: 12-74512
- GNIS feature ID: 2402970

Villas, Florida is an unincorporated community and census-designated place (CDP) in Lee County, Florida, United States. The population was 12,687 at the 2020 census, up from 11,569 at the 2010 census. It is part of the Cape Coral-Fort Myers, Florida Metropolitan Statistical Area.

== Geography ==
Villas is located in central Lee County. It is an unincorporated community, bordered to the north by Page Park and Pine Manor and to the west by Whiskey Creek and Cypress Lake, all unincorporated as well. U.S. Route 41 passes through Villas, leading north 6 miles (10 km) to the center of Fort Myers, the Lee county seat, and south 9 miles (14 km) to Estero.

According to the United States Census Bureau, the Villas CDP has a total area of 4.9 square miles (12.6 km^{2}), of which 4.6 square miles (12.0 km^{2}) are land and 0.2 square miles (0.6 km^{2}), or 4.61%, are water.

== Demographics ==
Historical population
Census	Pop.	Note	%±
1980	8,724		—
1990	9,898		13.5%
2000	11,346		14.6%
2010	11,569		2.0%
2020	12,687		9.7%

=== 2020 census ===
As of the 2020 census, Villas had a population of 12,687. The median age was 51.9 years. 12.2% of residents were under the age of 18 and 31.8% of residents were 65 years of age or older. For every 100 females there were 89.7 males, and for every 100 females age 18 and over there were 87.6 males age 18 and over.

100.0% of residents lived in urban areas, while 0.0% lived in rural areas.

There were 6,493 households in Villas, of which 14.4% had children under the age of 18 living in them. Of all households, 35.4% were married-couple households, 22.1% were households with a male householder and no spouse or partner present, and 34.0% were households with a female householder and no spouse or partner present. About 40.7% of all households were made up of individuals and 21.1% had someone living alone who was 65 years of age or older.

There were 8,127 housing units, of which 20.1% were vacant. The homeowner vacancy rate was 3.9% and the rental vacancy rate was 10.1%.

Racial composition as of the 2020 census
Race	Number	Percent
White	9,720	76.6%
Black or African American	587	4.6%
American Indian and Alaska Native	58	0.5%
Asian	287	2.3%
Native Hawaiian and Other Pacific Islander	4	0.0%
Some other race	601	4.7%
Two or more races	1,430	11.3%
Hispanic or Latino (of any race)	2,021	15.9%

=== 2000 census ===
As of the 2000 census, there were 11,346 people, 5,682 households, and 2,909 families residing in the CDP. The population density was 2,421.0 inhabitants per square mile (934.8/km^{2}). There were 6,574 housing units at an average density of 1,402.8 per square mile (541.6/km^{2}). The racial makeup of the CDP was 94.23% White, 1.65% African American, 0.17% Native American, 1.17% Asian, 0.04% Pacific Islander, 1.33% from other races, and 1.41% from two or more races. Hispanic or Latino of any race were 5.59% of the population.

There were 5,682 households, out of which 15.7% had children under the age of 18 living with them, 40.4% were married couples living together, 8.1% had a female householder with no husband present, and 48.8% were non-families. 38.7% of all households were made up of individuals, and 17.1% had someone living alone who was 65 years of age or older. The average household size was 1.94 and the average family size was 2.56.

In the CDP, the population was spread out, with 13.6% under the age of 18, 7.7% from 18 to 24, 28.2% from 25 to 44, 21.2% from 45 to 64, and 29.3% who were 65 years of age or older. The median age was 45 years. For every 100 females, there were 87.3 males. For every 100 females age 18 and over, there were 84.4 males.

The median income for a household in the CDP was $40,483, and the median income for a family was $49,975. Males had a median income of $31,517 versus $25,782 for females. The per capita income for the CDP was $25,880. About 3.5% of families and 6.5% of the population were below the poverty line, including 8.9% of those under age 18 and 7.2% of those age 65 or over.
