= Whiskey Creek, Florida =

- Census-designated place
- Location in Lee County and the state of Florida
- Coordinates: 26°34′24″N 81°53′25″W
- Country: United States
- State: Florida
- County: Lee

Area
  - Total: 1.62 sq mi (4.19 km^{2})
  - Land: 1.54 sq mi (4.00 km^{2})
  - Water: 0.073 sq mi (0.19 km^{2})
- Elevation: 10 ft (3.0 m)

Population (2020)
  - Total: 4,842
  - Density: 3,134.9/sq mi (1,210.39/km^{2})
- Time zone: UTC-5 (Eastern (EST))
  - Summer (DST): UTC-4 (EDT)
- FIPS code: 12-77137
- GNIS feature ID: 2403019

Whiskey Creek is a census-designated place (CDP) in Lee County, Florida, United States. The population was 4,842 at the 2020 census, up from 4,655 at the 2010 census. It is part of the Cape Coral-Fort Myers, Florida Metropolitan Statistical Area.

== Geography ==
Whiskey Creek is located in central Lee County. It is bordered to the north by the city of Fort Myers, the Lee county seat. To the west it is bordered by the Caloosahatchee River and by a small tributary, Whiskey Creek, for which the community is named. To the west across Whiskey Creek is the CDP of McGregor, while to the south is Cypress Lake and to the east are Villas, Pine Manor, and a southern extension of Fort Myers.

According to the United States Census Bureau, the Whiskey Creek CDP has a total area of 1.6 square miles (4.2 km^{2}), of which 1.5 square miles (4.0 km^{2}) are land and 0.1 square miles (0.2 km^{2}), or 4.50%, are water.

== Demographics ==
Historical population
Census	Pop.	Note	%±
2000	4,806		—
2010	4,655		−3.1%
2020	4,842		4.0%
U.S. Decennial Census

=== 2020 census ===
As of the 2020 census, Whiskey Creek had a population of 4,842. The median age was 56.0 years. 14.6% of residents were under the age of 18 and 34.4% of residents were 65 years of age or older. For every 100 females there were 87.9 males, and for every 100 females age 18 and over there were 85.5 males age 18 and over.

100.0% of residents lived in urban areas, while 0.0% lived in rural areas.

There were 2,309 households in Whiskey Creek, of which 18.7% had children under the age of 18 living in them. Of all households, 51.0% were married-couple households, 13.7% were households with a male householder and no spouse or partner present, and 29.4% were households with a female householder and no spouse or partner present. About 31.9% of all households were made up of individuals and 20.0% had someone living alone who was 65 years of age or older.

There were 2,678 housing units, of which 13.8% were vacant. The homeowner vacancy rate was 2.2% and the rental vacancy rate was 9.7%.

Racial composition as of the 2020 census
Race	Number	Percent
White	4,232	87.4%
Black or African American	90	1.9%
American Indian and Alaska Native	9	0.2%
Asian	63	1.3%
Native Hawaiian and Other Pacific Islander	0	0.0%
Some other race	87	1.8%
Two or more races	361	7.5%
Hispanic or Latino (of any race)	332	6.9%

=== 2000 census ===
As of the census of 2000, there were 4,806 people, 2,199 households, and 1,517 families residing in the CDP. The population density was 3,002.1 inhabitants per square mile (1,159.1/km^{2}). There were 2,374 housing units at an average density of 1,482.9 per square mile (572.6/km^{2}). The racial makeup of the CDP was 96.57% White, 0.96% African American, 0.08% Native American, 0.71% Asian, 0.02% Pacific Islander, 0.44% from other races, and 1.23% from two or more races. Hispanic or Latino of any race were 2.29% of the population.

There were 2,199 households, out of which 19.7% had children under the age of 18 living with them, 61.1% were married couples living together, 6.0% had a female householder with no husband present, and 31.0% were non-families. 26.6% of all households were made up of individuals, and 17.8% had someone living alone who was 65 years of age or older. The average household size was 2.19 and the average family size was 2.62.

In the CDP, the population was spread out, with 17.0% under the age of 18, 3.1% from 18 to 24, 19.0% from 25 to 44, 27.8% from 45 to 64, and 33.1% who were 65 years of age or older. The median age was 53 years. For every 100 females, there were 87.3 males. For every 100 females age 18 and over, there were 82.5 males.

The median income for a household in the CDP was $52,068, and the median income for a family was $60,383. Males had a median income of $40,911 versus $30,094 for females. The per capita income for the CDP was $29,304. About 1.7% of families and 2.2% of the population were below the poverty line, including 1.3% of those under age 18 and 2.4% of those age 65 or over.
