= Wilson Pigott Bridge =

Bridge in Florida, United States of America

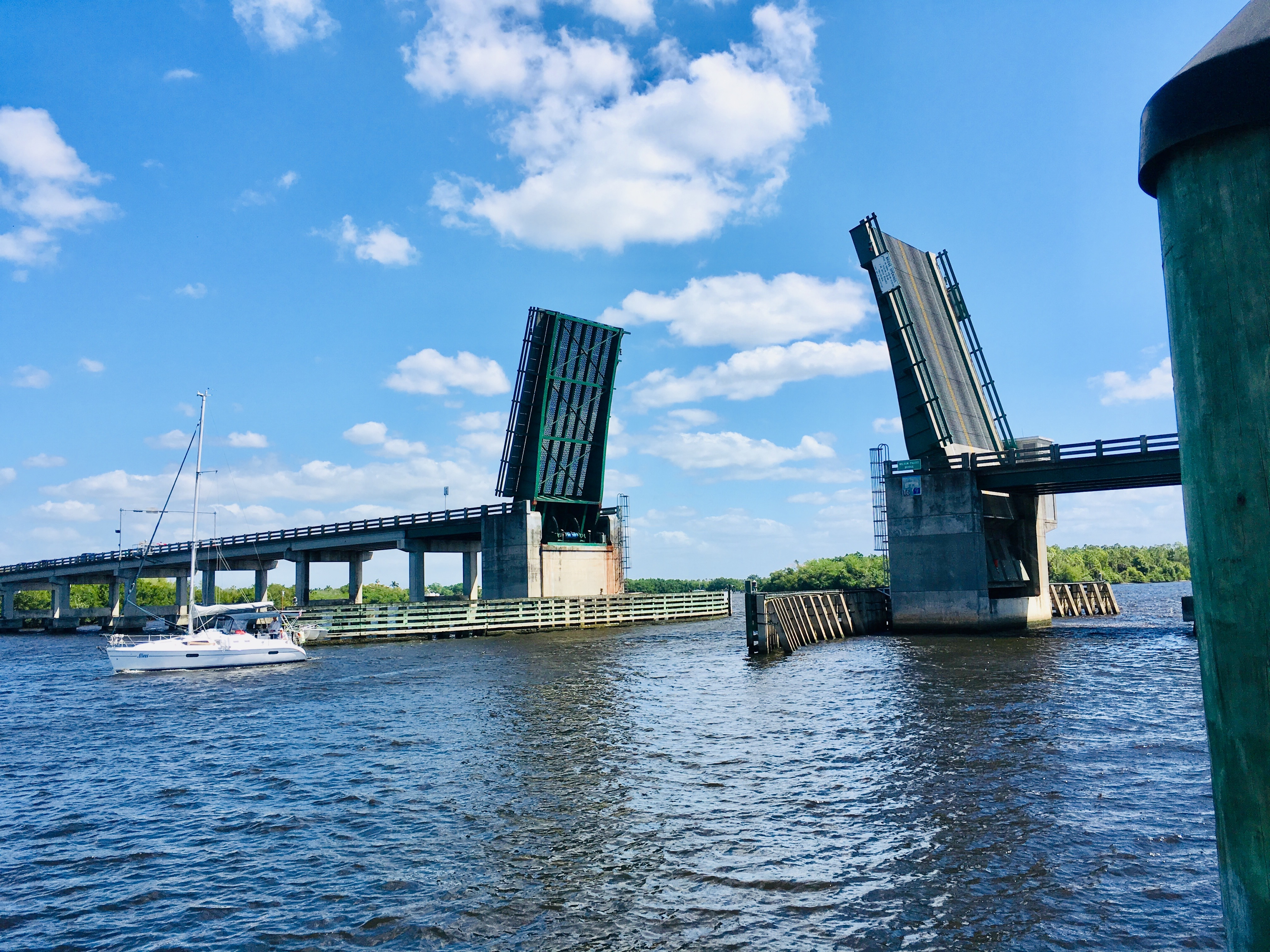
- Wilson Pigott Bridge open for a sailboat
- Coordinates: 26°42′58.44″N 81°45′38.35″W
- Carries: SR 31 (Babcock Ranch Road)
- Crosses: Caloosahatchee River
- Locale: Fort Myers Shores, Florida
- Official name: Wilson Pigott Bridge

Characteristics
- Design: Bascule bridge
- Clearance above: 27 Feet (with drawbridge lowered)

Statistics
- Toll: None

The Wilson Pigott Bridge (also locally known as the State Road 31 Bridge) is a small two-lane drawbridge located near Fort Myers Shores in Lee County, Florida. It is one of four drawbridges in Lee County. It is 27 feet tall.

The Wilson Pigott Bridge was built in 1960, and it carries State Road 31 over the Caloosahatchee River. This segment of State Road 31 is located between State Road 80 on the southern side of the river, and State Road 78 on the north side of the river. The Lee Civic Center is located nearby.

It is named for Wilson Pigott, a Lee County Commissioner.

== History ==
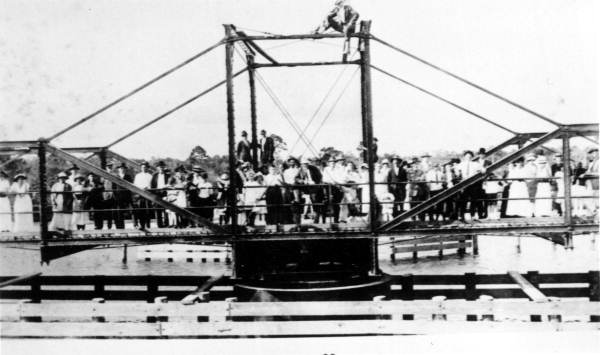
Former SR 31 swing bridge in Olga

The Wilson Pigott Bridge opened for traffic in 1960. It was built to replace an earlier swing bridge in Olga that previously carried State Road 31. The now-demolished swing bridge in Olga was built in 1915. It was located about three miles upstream from the Wilson Pigott Bridge, where it linked North Olga Drive and South Olga Drive.

== Future ==
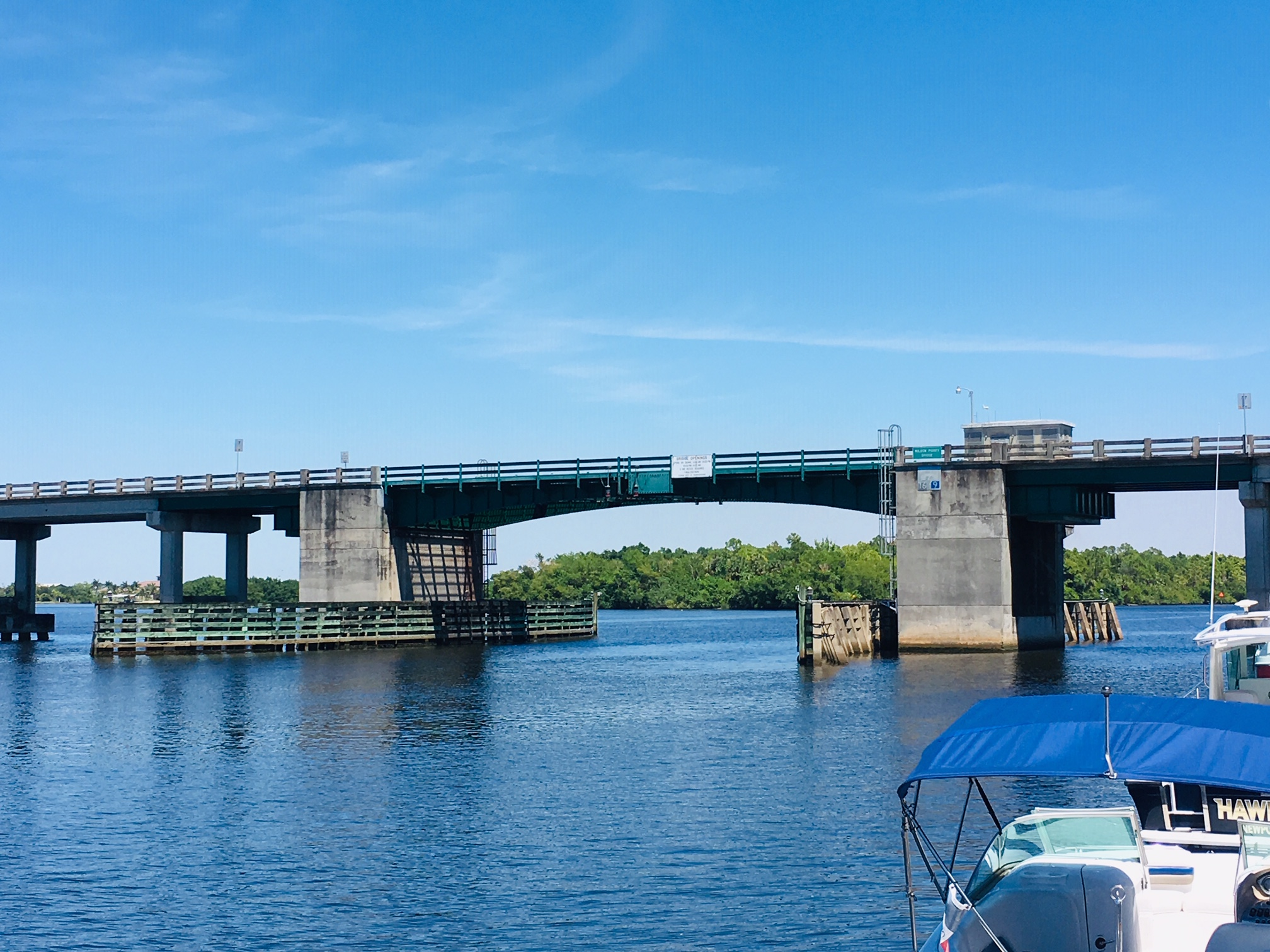
Wilson Pigott Bridge

The Florida Department of Transportation (FDOT) is planning to widen much of SR 31 to a multi-lane divided highway. This project will eventually lead to the replacement of the Wilson Pigott Bridge with a wider bridge. FDOT is considering replacing the bridge with either another drawbridge or a high-level fixed-span bridge.
