= Alva Bridge =

Bridge in Florida, United States of America

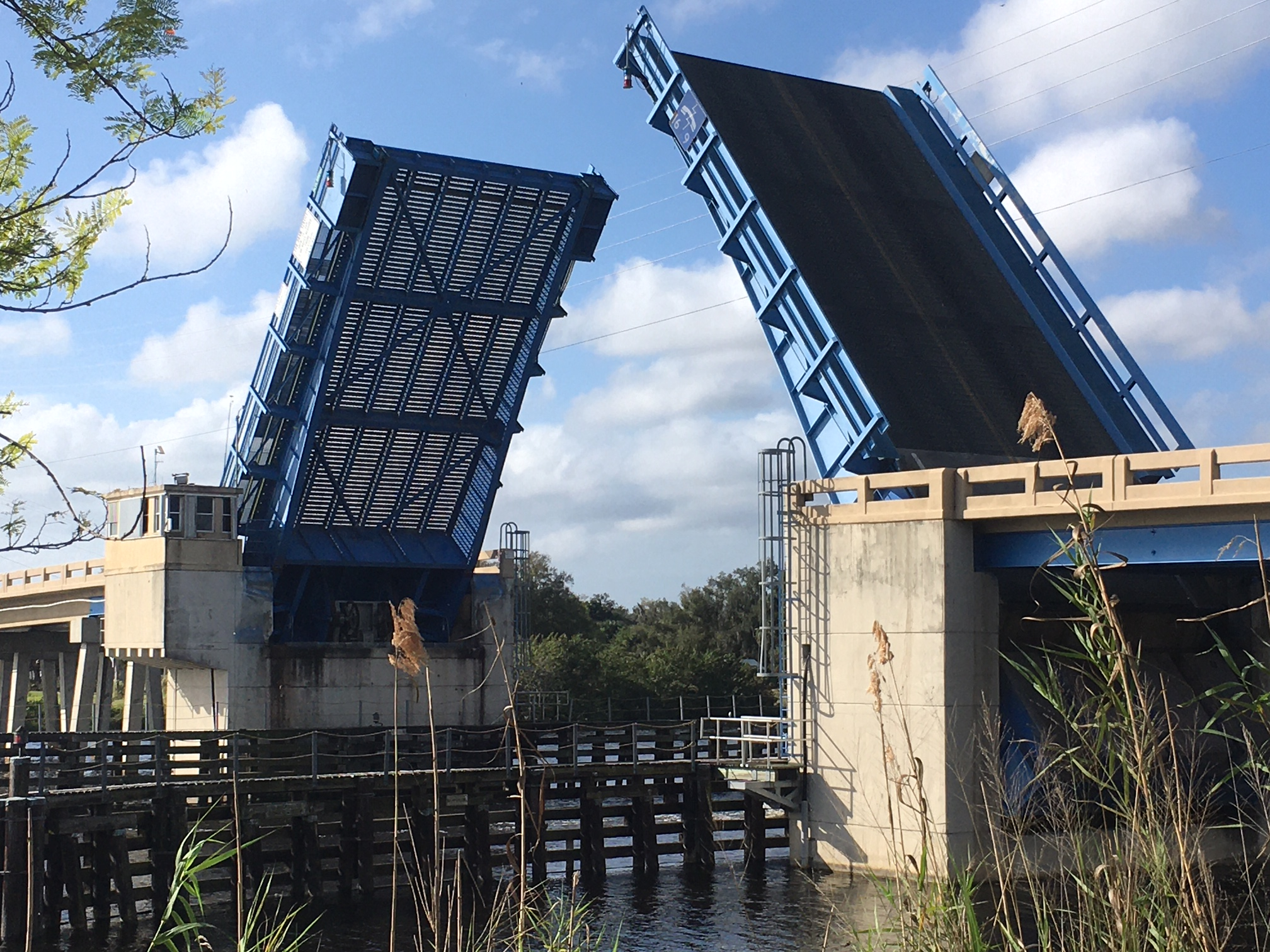
- The Alva Bridge open for vessel traffic
- Coordinates: 26.7134°N 81.6100°W
- Carries: Broadway
- Crosses: Caloosahatchee River
- Locale: Alva, Florida

Characteristics
- Design: Concrete and Steel Bascule Bridge
- Clearance below: 21 feet (6.4 m) (with drawbridge lowered)

History
- Opened: 1903 (original bridge); 1925 (second bridge); 1969 (current bridge)

Statistics
- Toll: None

The bridge unofficially known as the Alva Bridge is a small two-lane drawbridge located in Alva, Florida. The bridge is 21 feet tall and it is one of four vehicle drawbridges in Lee County. The bridge carries Broadway over the Caloosahatchee River.

== History ==
The first bridge at this site was a small swing bridge constructed in 1903, and it was the closest bridge to Fort Myers up until 1924. In 1925, the original bridge was replaced with a new swing bridge. The old swing bridge was then dismantled and taken to Matlacha, Florida, where it operated as the Matlacha Pass Bridge for a year before being destroyed by a hurricane. The new swing bridge operated until 1966, when it was destroyed by a barge transporting rocket parts to the Kennedy Space Center. The second swing bridge then had to be replaced by the current drawbridge, a bascule-type bridge which opened in 1969, after three years of construction.

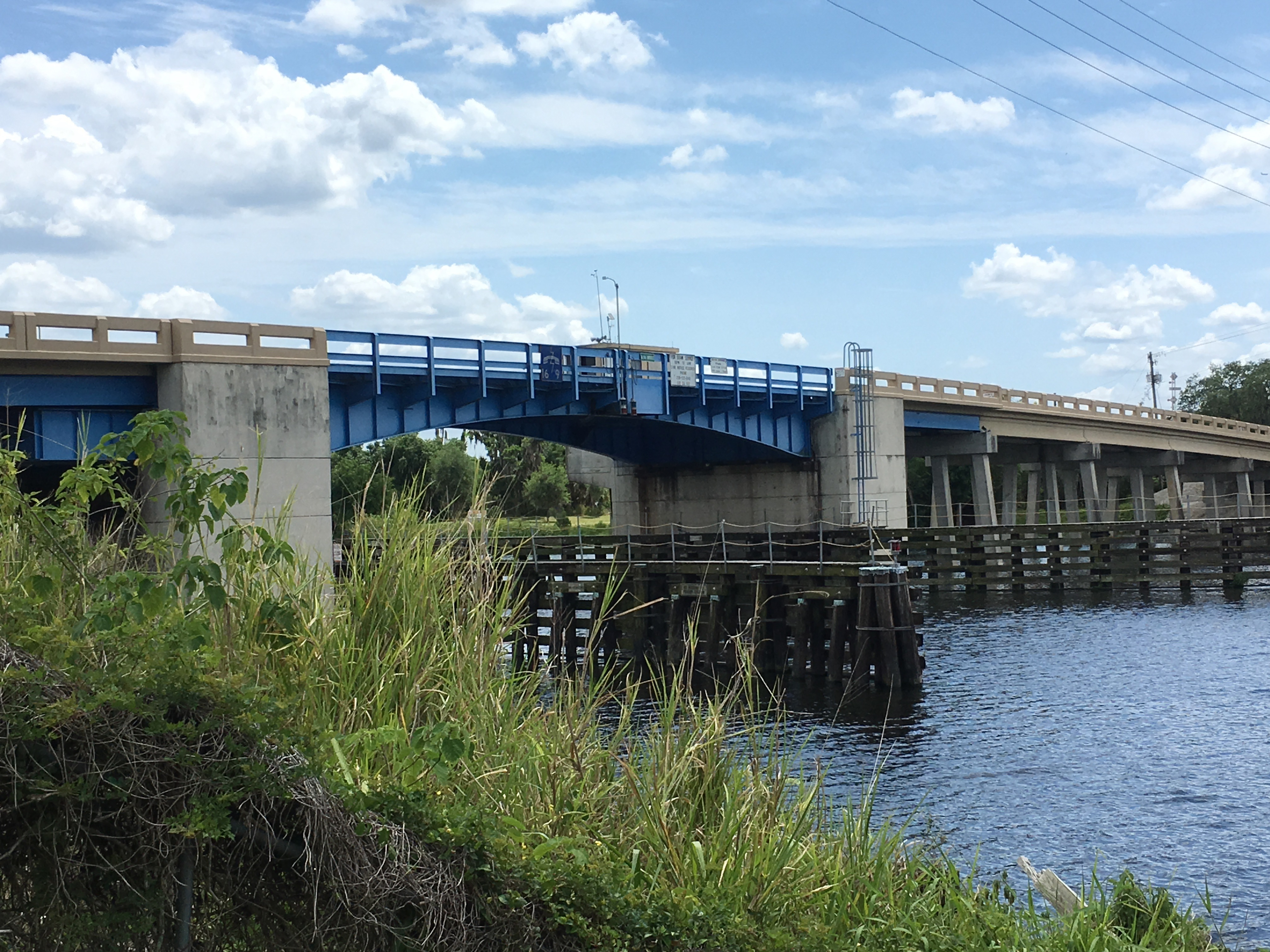
The Alva Bridge as seen from the north river bank

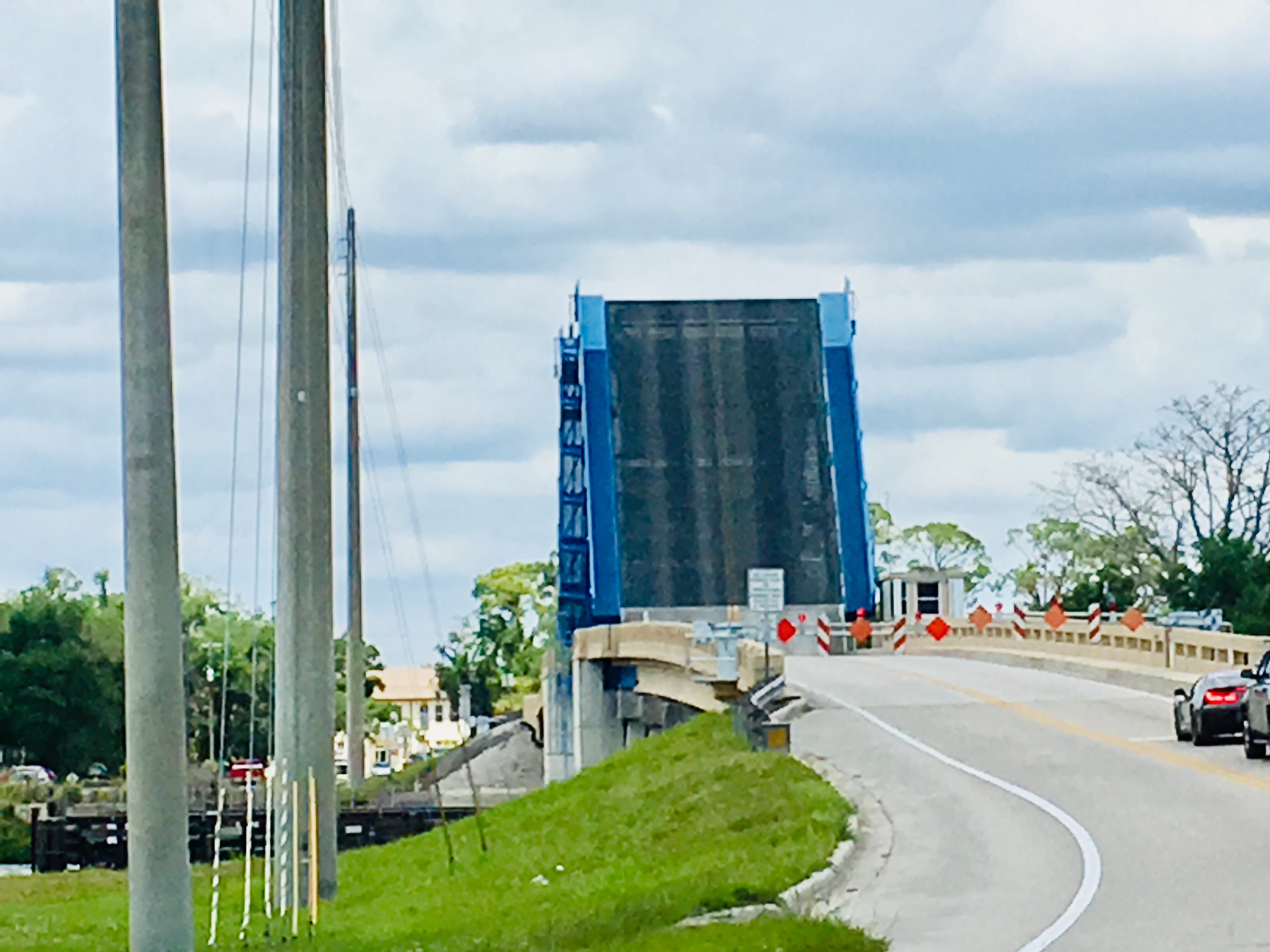
Alva Bridge open for vessel traffic as seen from Broadway on the south side

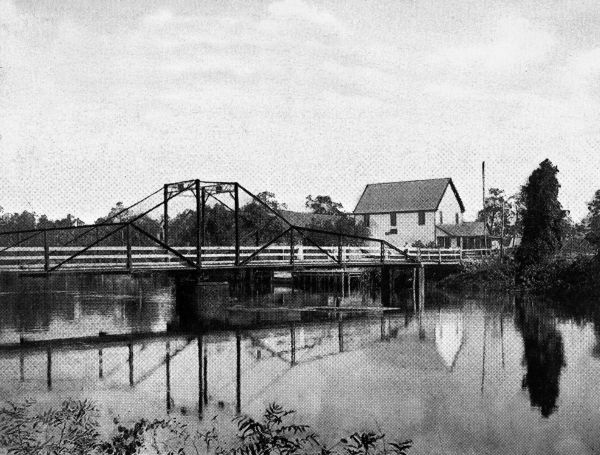
Former swing bridge
