= Verandah, Florida =

- Census-designated place
- Location within Florida Location within the United States
- Coordinates: 26°41′49″N 81°44′52″W
- Country: United States
- State: Florida
- County: Lee

Area
  - Total: 2.48 sq mi (6.42 km^{2})
  - Land: 2.13 sq mi (5.51 km^{2})
  - Water: 0.35 sq mi (0.90 km^{2})
- Elevation: 7 ft (2.1 m)

Population (2020)
  - Total: 1,791
  - Density: 841.2/sq mi (324.77/km^{2})
- Time zone: UTC-5 (Eastern (EST))
  - Summer (DST): UTC-4 (EDT)
- ZIP Code: 33905 (Fort Myers)
- Area code: 239
- FIPS code: 12-74016
- GNIS feature ID: 2806011

Verandah is a census-designated place (CDP) in northeastern Lee County, Florida, United States. It is bordered to the north by Fort Myers Shores, to the northeast by Olga, and to the south by Buckingham. Fort Myers, the Lee county seat, is 10 miles (16 km) to the southwest via Florida State Road 80 (Palm Beach Boulevard).

Verandah was first listed as a CDP prior to the 2020 census. The population was 1,791 at the 2020 census. It is part of the Cape Coral-Fort Myers, Florida Metropolitan Statistical Area.

== Demographics ==
Historical population
Census	Pop.	Note	%±
2020	1,791		—
U.S. Decennial Census

Verandah first appeared as a census designated place in the 2020 U.S. census.

=== 2020 census ===
As of the 2020 census, Verandah had a population of 1,791. The median age was 67.2 years. 3.9% of residents were under the age of 18 and 58.7% of residents were 65 years of age or older. For every 100 females there were 95.1 males, and for every 100 females age 18 and over there were 93.8 males age 18 and over.

100.0% of residents lived in urban areas, while 0.0% lived in rural areas.

There were 917 households in Verandah, of which 5.2% had children under the age of 18 living in them. Of all households, 72.8% were married-couple households, 8.3% were households with a male householder and no spouse or partner present, and 13.5% were households with a female householder and no spouse or partner present. About 17.8% of all households were made up of individuals and 11.7% had someone living alone who was 65 years of age or older.

There were 1,294 housing units, of which 29.1% were vacant. The homeowner vacancy rate was 3.5% and the rental vacancy rate was 4.1%.

Racial composition as of the 2020 census
Race	Number	Percent
White	1,677	93.6%
Black or African American	30	1.7%
American Indian and Alaska Native	5	0.3%
Asian	15	0.8%
Native Hawaiian and Other Pacific Islander	0	0.0%
Some other race	11	0.6%
Two or more races	53	3.0%
Hispanic or Latino (of any race)	51	2.8%
