= Veranda (disambiguation) =

A veranda or verandah is a roofed, open-air gallery or porch.

Veranda may also refer to:

- Veranda (magazine), an American lifestyle magazine
- Union Pacific's Second Generation GTEL locomotives, commonly called the "Verandas" due to their design.

Verandah may also refer to:

- Verandah (vine system), a vine training system
- Verandah, Florida, United States, a census-designated place
- Verandah, Isle of Man, a series of road bends on the island
- Off the verandah, a concept in anthropology

== See also ==
- Varanda (disambiguation)
