= Azgapet =

Leader of tribe/clan

An azgapet was a leader of a tribe or clan in ancient and medieval Armenia, similar to a chieftain. The term originates from the words azg (Armenian: ազգ), which means "extended family" or "clan", and pet, which means "chief". The term azgapet had been used in addition to other similar terms for roles in tribal collectivities, such as tanuter (Armenian: տանուտեր) and nahapet (Armenian: նահապետ). Patriarch Hayk, the legendary and eponymous progenitor of the Armenian people, is sometimes referred to as azgapet. One prominent medieval work which mentions Armenian azgapets is the 10th-century History of the Province of Aghvank by Movses Kaghankatvatsi, which mentions several dignitaries, including azgapets, who signed the Constitution of Aghven, a 5th-century legal document commissioned by King Vachagan II the Pious of Aghvank (r. c. 485 – 523). One family with origins in the village of Syghnakh in Artsakh claims descent from azgapet Marut, a chieftain from the Varanda Valley and a consignee of the Constitution.

== See also ==
- Culture of Artsakh
