= Cape Coral Bridge =

Bridge in Florida, United States

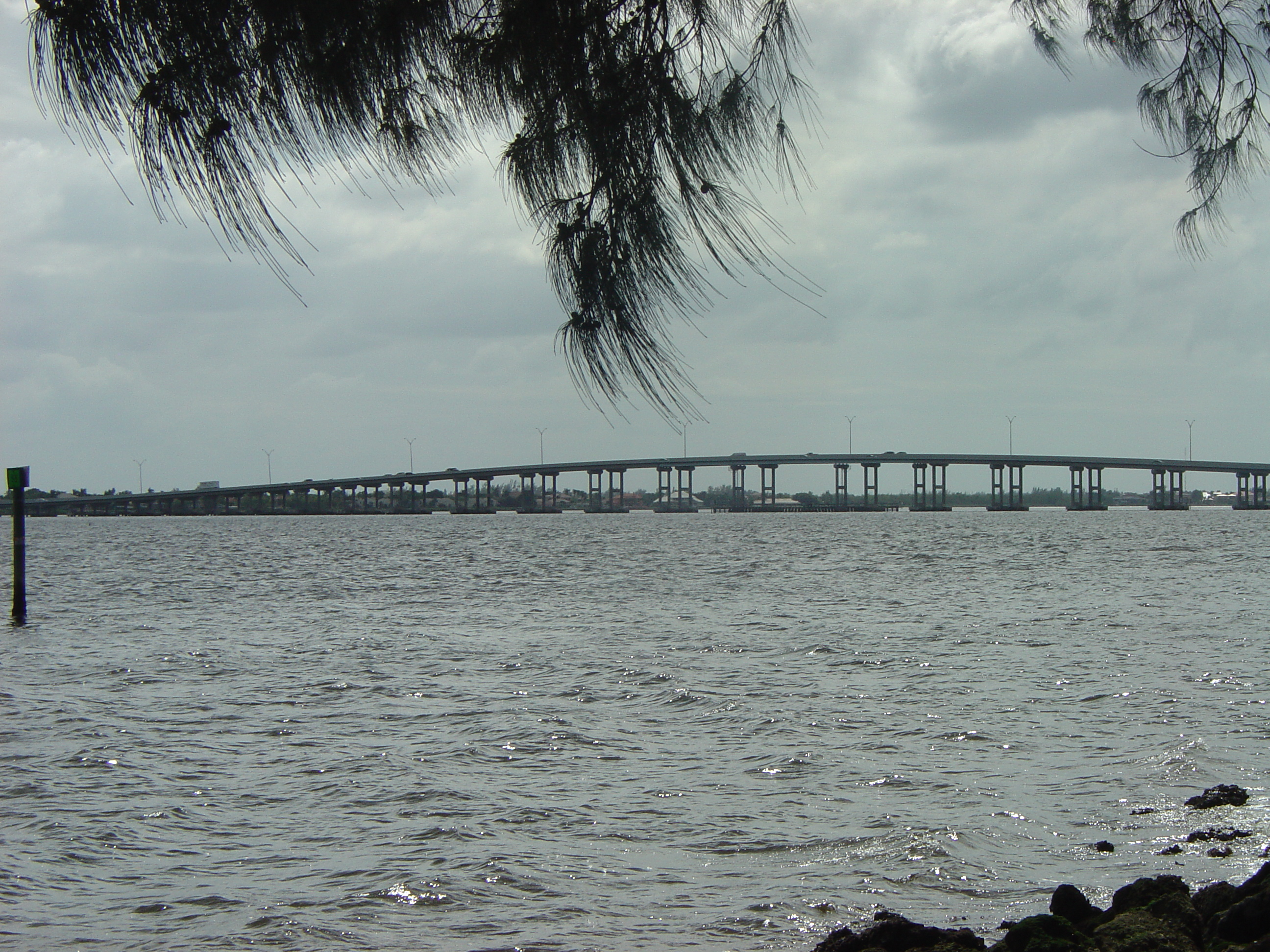
- Coordinates: 26°33′40.04″N 81°55′44.96″W
- Carries: CR 867A (Cape Coral Bridge Road)
- Crosses: Caloosahatchee River
- Locale: Cape Coral, Florida
- Maintained by: Lee County Department of Transportation
- ID number: 124044 (westbound); 124065 (eastbound)

Characteristics
- Design: Concrete girder
- Total length: 3,400 ft (1,036 m)
- Longest span: 95 feet (29 m)
- Clearance below: 55 feet (17 m)
- No. of lanes: 4

History
- Opened: Westbound Bridge (original): March 14, 1964; 62 years ago; Eastbound Bridge: 1989

Statistics
- Daily traffic: 37,960 (2017)
- Toll: For Westbound traffic only (As of 2022) LeeWay/Sunpass/Interoperable Transponders: $2 Toll By Plate (w/o LeeWay/SunPass/Interoperable Transponders): $5 +$2 For Additional Axles

Location
- Interactive map of Cape Coral Bridge

The Cape Coral Bridge is a bridge located in Southwest Florida. It spans the Caloosahatchee River connecting McGregor and Cape Coral. It is made up of two parallel fixed spans, each 3,400 feet (1,000 m) long.

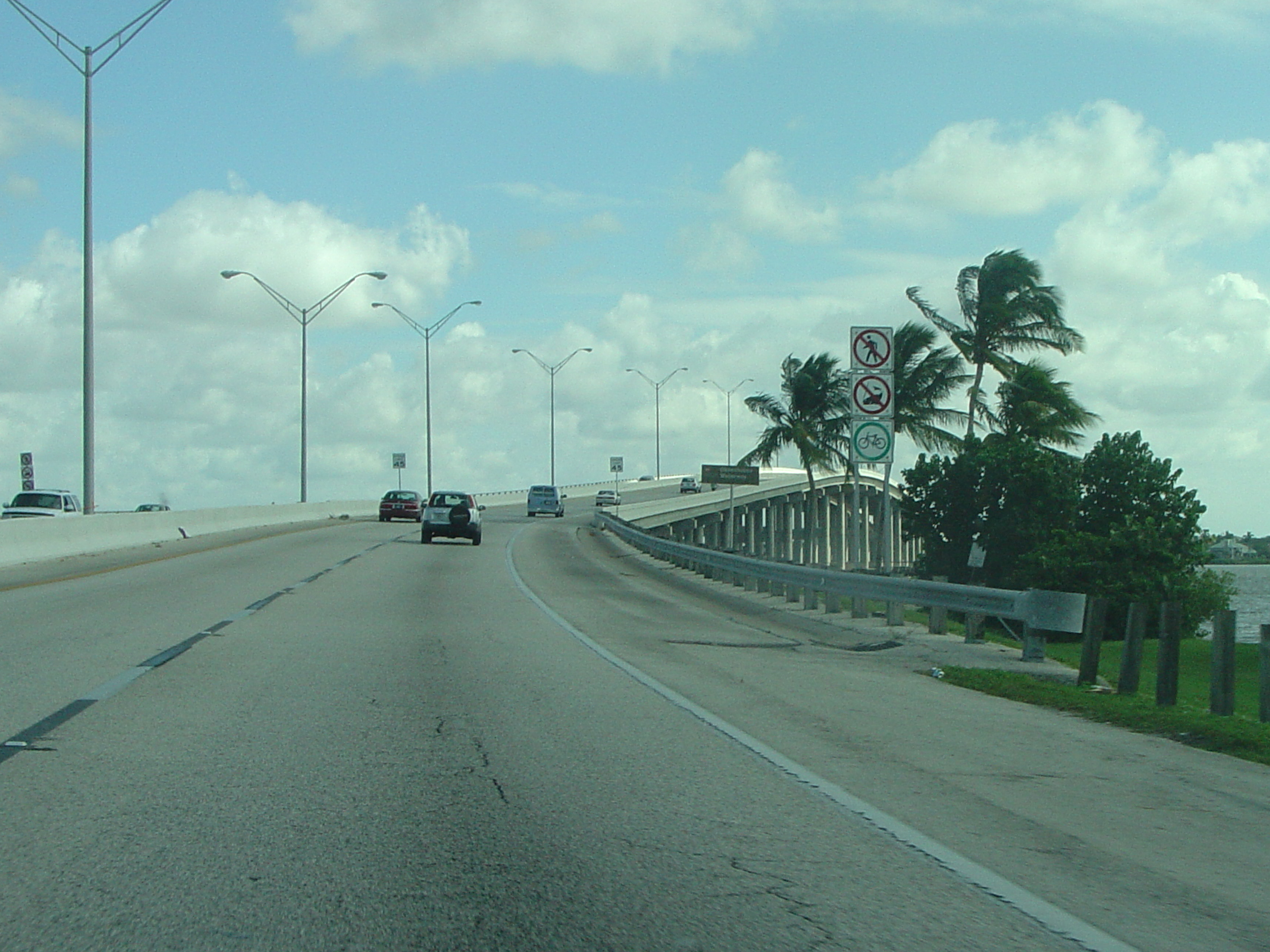
The Cape Coral Side of the eastbound span (the 1989 span)

== History ==
The original span opened for traffic on March 14, 1964, with one lane in each direction. In 1989, a second parallel span opened south of the first span, with two lanes for eastbound traffic, and westbound traffic using both lanes on the original span. In conjunction with the new eastbound span, a four lane overpass was constructed over the intersection of State Road 867 (McGregor Boulevard) just east of the bridge.

The Cape Coral Bridge was the only link between Fort Myers and Cape Coral until 1997, when the Midpoint Memorial Bridge opened just north of the Cape Coral Bridge on the Caloosahatchee River.

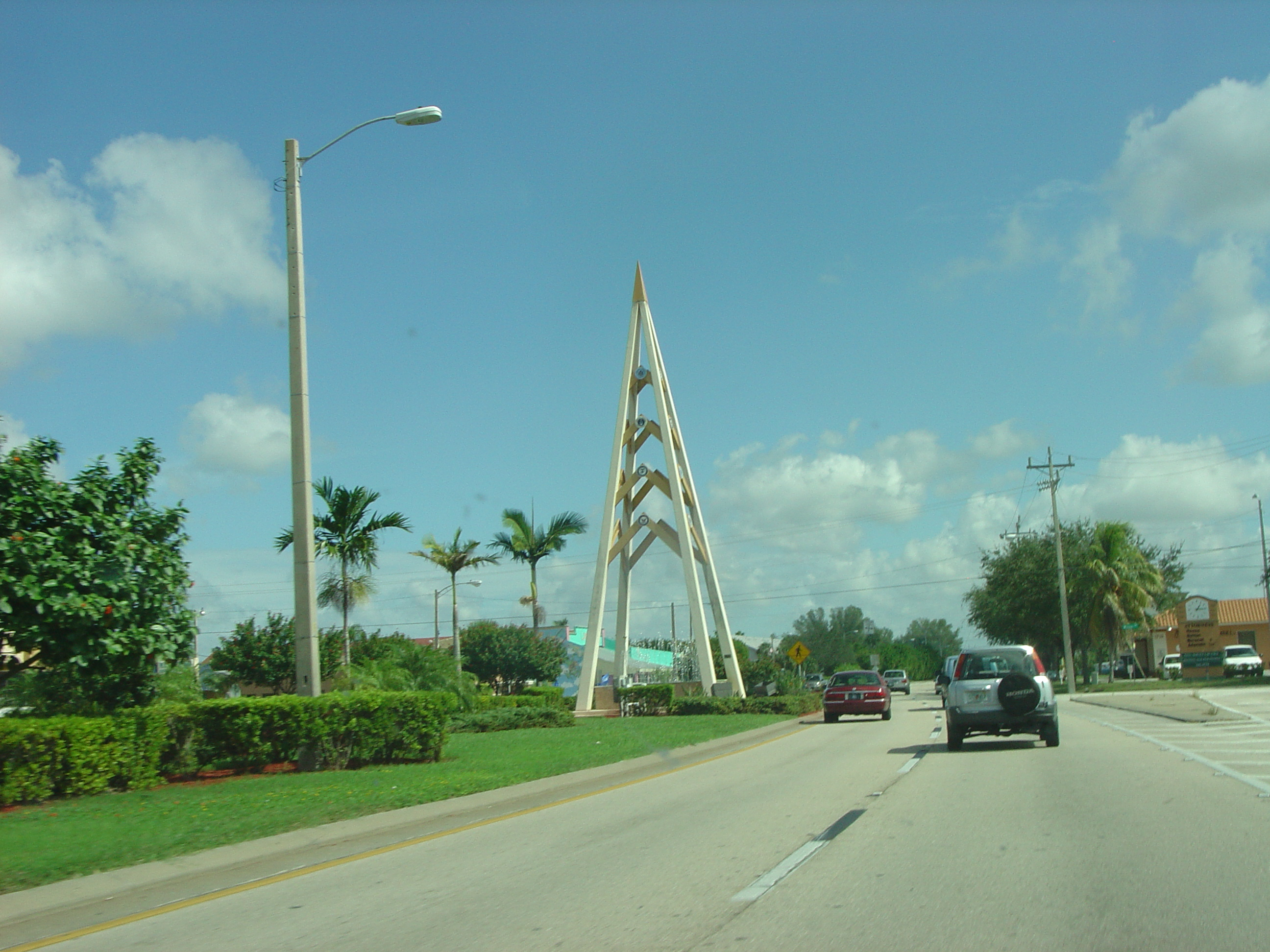
"Welcome" Monument and Water Fountain on the median of Cape Coral Parkway on the Cape Coral Side of the bridge

The bridge is owned by the Lee County Department of Transportation. There is currently a two dollar toll in effect for westbound vehicles only, and there is no tolls for eastbound traffic. Florida's statewide SunPass prepaid electronic toll collection system is accepted on the Cape Coral Bridge, along with Lee County's "Leeway" prepaid toll system, which is also used on the Midpoint Bridge, and the Sanibel Causeway. However, there is a variable pricing scheme in effect.

== Future ==
Due to the age of the 1964 structure, there are currently plans to rebuild the Cape Coral Bridge. Initially, plans included replacing the westbound Cape Coral Bridge with a new three-lane bridge and widening the eastbound bridge (built in 1989) to three lanes on both direction. In 2023, the county instead decided to replace both bridges with new three-lane bridges for a total of six lanes. Additionally, the project will also allow pedestrian access to the bridge, improve bicycle lanes and improve the intersection between Cape Coral Parkway and Del Prado Boulevard. The project is expected to begin in 2026.
