= Florida State Road 31 =

Highway in Florida, US

State Road 31

Route information
- Maintained by FDOT
- Length: 36.357 mi (58.511 km)
- Existed: 1945–present

Major junctions
- South end: SR 80 near Fort Myers Shores
- North end: SR 70 near Arcadia

Location
- Country: United States
- State: Florida
- Counties: Lee, Charlotte, DeSoto

Highway system
- Florida State Highway System; Interstate; US; State; Former; Pre‑1945; Toll; Scenic
← SR 30E	→ SR 33

State Road 31 (SR 31) is a state highway in Southwest Florida in Lee, Charlotte, and DeSoto counties. It is about 36 miles (58 kilometers) long. The entire roadway is two lanes wide, even near Fort Myers. The highway crosses the Caloosahatchee River via the Wilson Pigott Bridge, a small drawbridge, a mile north of the southern terminus. The northern terminus is with an intersection of SR 70 near Arcadia. The southern terminus is with an intersection of SR 80 near Fort Myers Shores. The route is home to G. Pierce Wood Memorial Hospital, replacing the old De Soto Aircraft Field.

== History ==
Originally designated State Road 2, the route was redesignated State Road 31 in 1945 as part of a statewide renumbering.

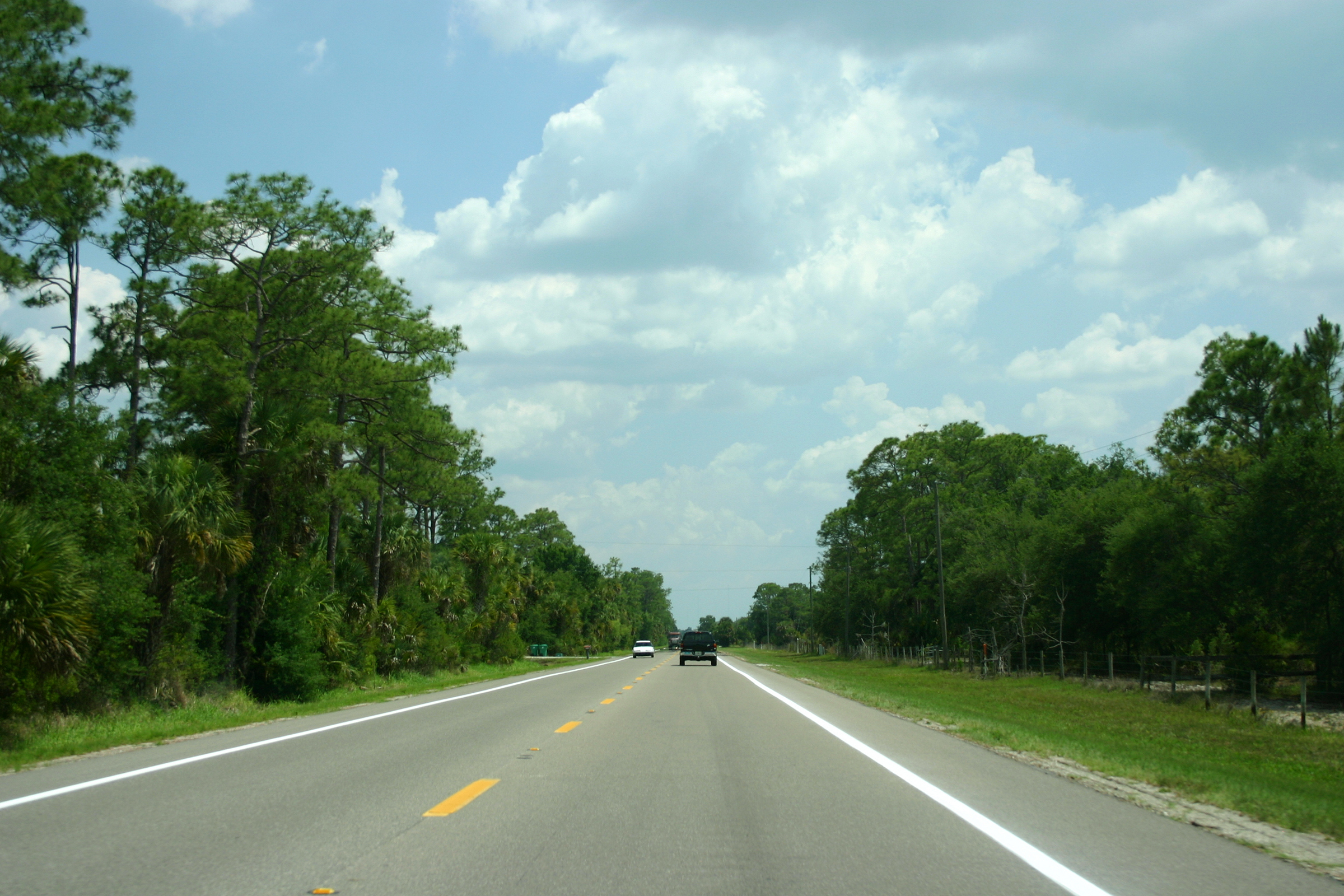

Prior to the construction of the Wilson Pigott Bridge in 1960, State Road 31 crossed the Caloosahatchee River about three miles farther east of the current bridge. Just north of Fort Myers Shores, it travelled east along North River Road (then-State Road 78) and crossed the river on a swing bridge into Olga, where it continued to State Road 80 along what is today Olga Drive. The current route south of North River Road carried State Road 78 at the time.

In 2006, Cameratta Properties purchased 5,860 acres (24 km^{2}) of land along SR 31 in Charlotte County for a master-planned community that upon completion will add approximately 17,000 homes and 500,000 square feet (50,000 m^{2}) of retail and office space. The entity formed to Babcock Ranch.

=== Former Naples segment ===
Prior to the 1980s, a north-south route near Naples was designated as a secondary state road with the designation of SR 31. This segment, locally known as Airport-Pulling Road, became (CR 31) when it was turned over to county control in the 1980s.

== Major intersections ==
County	Location	mi	km	Destinations	Notes
Lee	Fort Myers Shores	0.000	0.000	SR 80 (Palm Beach Boulevard) – LaBelle, Fort Myers	
Lee	Caloosahatchee River (Okeechobee Waterway)	1.04	1.67	Wilson Pigott Bridge	
Lee		1.407	2.264	SR 78 west (Bayshore Road) – Lee Civic Center	
Lee		2.670	4.297	CR 78 east (North River Road) – Caloosahatchee Regional Park, W.P. Franklin Campground	
Charlotte	Bermont	16.990	27.343	CR 74 – Palmdale, Punta Gorda	
DeSoto		25.541	41.104	CR 763 west	
DeSoto		31.893	51.327	CR 760A west	
DeSoto		34.102	54.882	CR 760 east	
DeSoto		36.357	58.511	SR 70 – Arcadia, Okeechobee	
1.000 mi = 1.609 km; 1.000 km = 0.621 mi
