= Sanibel Causeway =

Causeway in Southwest Florida, U.S.

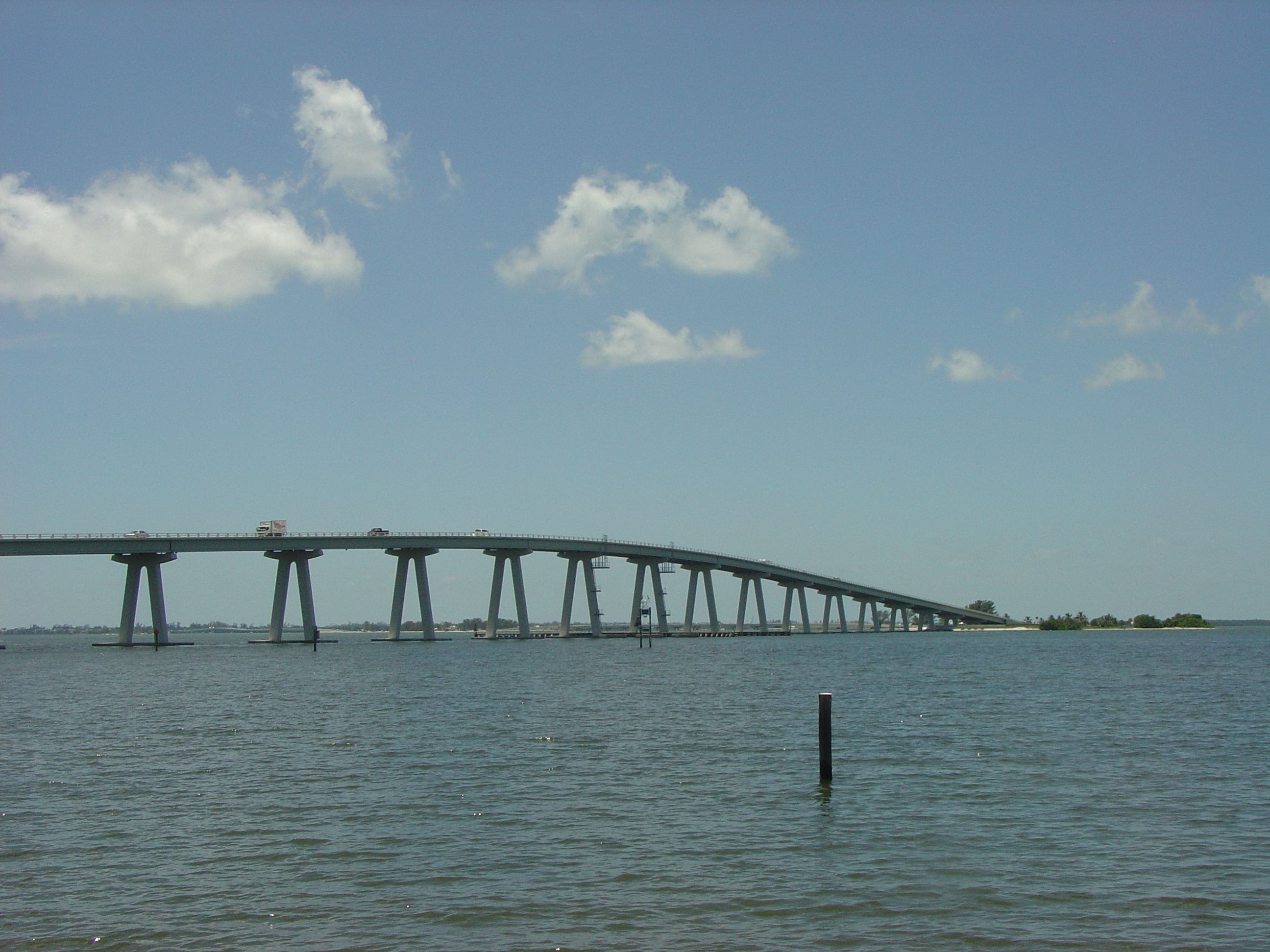
- Bridge A, with Bridges B and C in the background.
- Coordinates: 26°28′35″N 82°01′32″W
- Carries: 2 lanes of Causeway Boulevard
- Crosses: San Carlos Bay
- Locale: Sanibel, Florida
- Official name: Sanibel Causeway
- Maintained by: Lee County Department of Transportation

Characteristics
- Design: 3 concrete girder bridges
- Total length: 3 miles (5 km)
- Width: 40 feet (12 m)
- Clearance below: 70 feet (21 m) (Bridge A); 26 feet (8 m) (Bridge C)

History
- Opened: Original Causeway & Bridges: May 26, 1963; Current Bridges: June 28, 2007 (Bridge A); April 12, 2007 (Bridge B); September 8, 2007 (Bridge C)

Statistics
- Toll: For vehicles entering Sanibel Island only (westbound): $6 for all vehicles with a SunPass/interoperable transponder.; $9 for all vehicles without a SunPass/interoperable transponder (Toll-By-Plate); ($3 per additional axle)

Location
- Interactive map of Sanibel Causeway

The Sanibel Causeway is a causeway in Southwest Florida that spans San Carlos Bay, connecting Sanibel Island with the Florida mainland in Punta Rassa. The causeway consists of three separate two-lane bridge spans, and two-man-made causeway islands between them. The bridges are not individually named and are inventoried by the county as simply bridges A, B, and C. The entire causeway facility is owned by Lee County and operated by the Lee County Department of Transportation (DOT). The causeway is 3 miles (5 km) long with a $6 toll for island-bound vehicles only. The causeway was originally built in 1963 and was rebuilt in 2007.

Portions of the causeway were destroyed by Hurricane Ian on September 28, 2022 and reopened on October 19, 2022.

== Route description ==
The Sanibel Causeway begins just west of the intersection of McGregor Boulevard and Punta Rassa Road in Punta Rassa. From here, it passes through the toll plaza and crosses the first bridge (Bridge A). Bridge A is a 70-foot tall fixed-span bridge and is the tallest bridge in Lee County. Bridge A crosses the primary navigation channel of San Carlos Bay and comes to the first causeway island. On the first island, the causeway turns south and crosses the second bridge (Bridge B). Bridge B is a low-level bridge and comes to the second causeway island. The causeway then crosses the third and final bridge (Bridge C) which connects the causeway to Sanibel Island. Bridge C is the longest of the three bridges and has a 26-foot vertical clearance over the navigation channel.

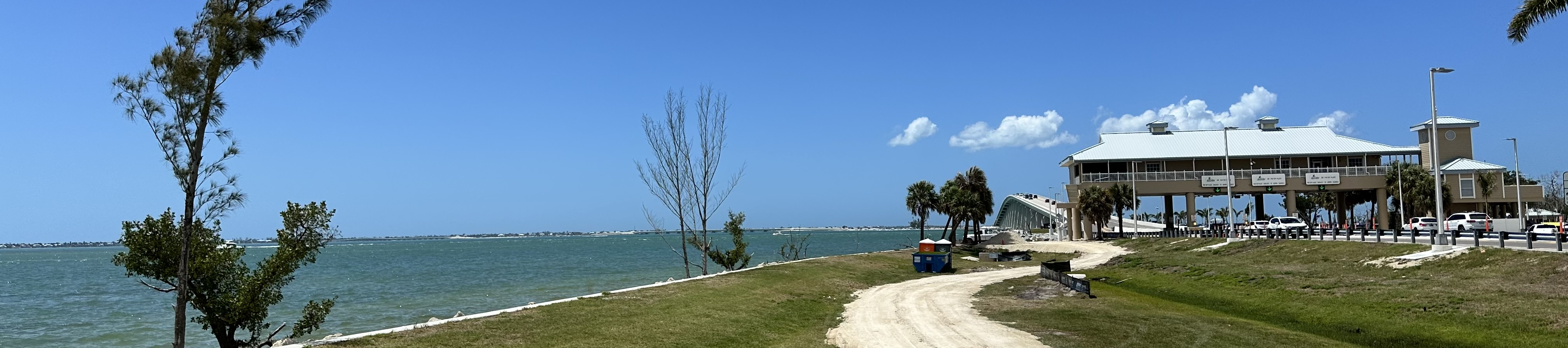
Toll Plaza in Punta Rassa with causeway and bridges in the background

== Causeway Islands Park ==
The two causeway islands are also operated as a public beach park known as Causeway Islands Park. The islands are a popular area among beachgoers for windsurfing and kitesurfing.

== History ==
=== Background ===
As early as 1912, automobile ferries serviced Sanibel Island from the mainland at Punta Rassa. The idea of building a bridge from the mainland to the island was highly controversial amongst the early residents of the island, as many thought a bridge would ruin the beauty and isolated feel of the island. One of the largest proponents of building a bridge was island resident Hugo Lindgren, who saw the island's potential and tried to convince Lee County to build a bridge. Despite the opinions of the islanders, it was clear that the ferries were insufficient by the mid-1950s as demand increased leading to long lines of vehicles waiting to cross the bay. Wildfires on the island in 1955 further convinced the county to build a bridge as it would improve access to the island in emergency situations.

=== Planning and construction ===
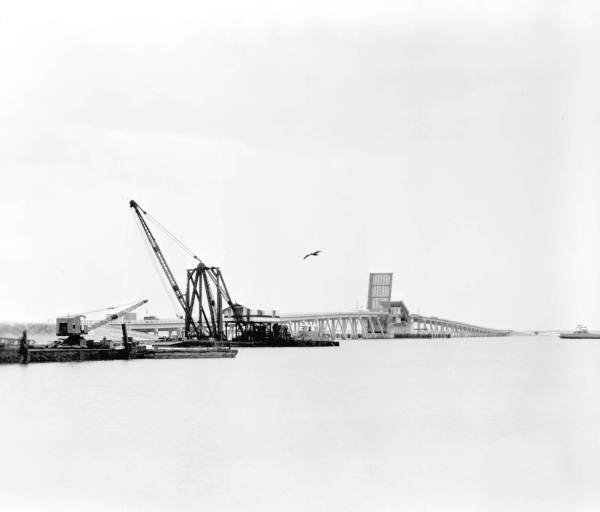
Original Bridge A, a drawbridge, nearing completion in 1963

An early proposal would have had a bridge running from Point Ybel (where the Sanibel Lighthouse is currently located) to the mainland, since it was the shortest route. The current route was ultimately selected due to the bay being shallower and two causeway islands could be created by dredging. While Bailey Road was initially planned to be the terminus of the bridge on the island, Hugo Lindgren granted the county right-of-way through his property on the bay, which the county accepted. Construction on the entire causeway and the three original bridges lasted 15 months and cost $2.73 million. It was the last major project designed by Hector F.J. Estrup, civil engineer and owner of Caribbean Engineers. The original Bridge A included a 26-foot tall drawbridge over the navigation channel.

=== Opening and early years ===
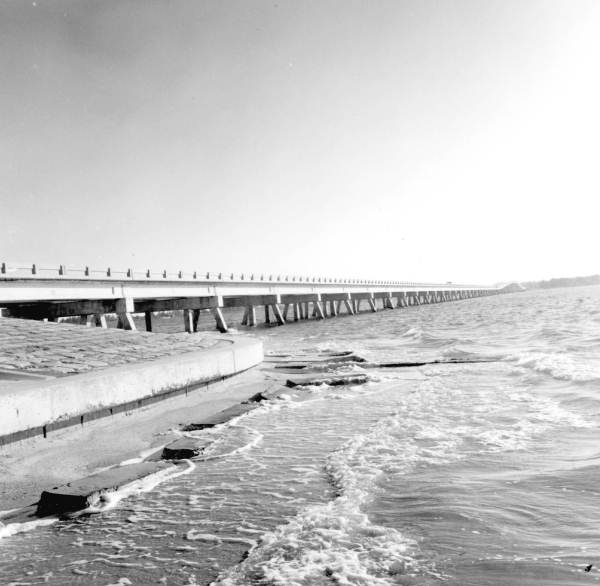
Original Bridge C in 1969

The Sanibel Causeway was completed and opened for traffic on May 26, 1963. Due to the causeway, Sanibel Island experienced major growth in the early 1970s leading to Sanibel's incorporation into Lee County's third city, which took place on November 5, 1974. Former congressman and CIA director Porter Goss served as Sanibel's first mayor.

By the early 1990s, the original bridges began showing signs of rapid deterioration due to the bay's saltwater, prompting the county to make major repairs. As a result, Lee County briefly proposed the idea of replacing the bridges with a single four-lane high-span bridge. This idea was abandoned due to opposition from island residents. Further repairs were made in 1997 as rapid deterioration from overall lack of maintenance and saltwater corrosion continued. In 2001, the county made plans to replace Bridges B and C, and make major repairs to Bridge A (the drawbridge).

During a routine inspection in early 2003, severe cracks were discovered underneath a 48-foot (15 m) deck section on Bridge B. After this discovery, all three of the bridges were very closely monitored, and the damaged section was braced with additional steel pilings. Bridge B's speed limit was temporarily lowered to 10 miles per hour (16 km/h), and the rest of the causeway's speed limit was lowered to 20 miles per hour (32 km/h). A temporary 10-ton weight limit was put in place. Lee County determined that the 48-foot (15 m) deck section needed to be completely replaced as soon as possible. After extensive preparations, the causeway was shut down all day on January 20, 2003 to replace the damaged deck section was replaced with a steel grate section. The replacement was completed quickly, and the causeway re-opened ahead of schedule. After this turn of events, Lee County reexamined its original plan for rehabilitating Bridge A (the drawbridge), and concluded that all three of the bridges needed to be replaced as soon as possible.

=== Replacing the bridges ===
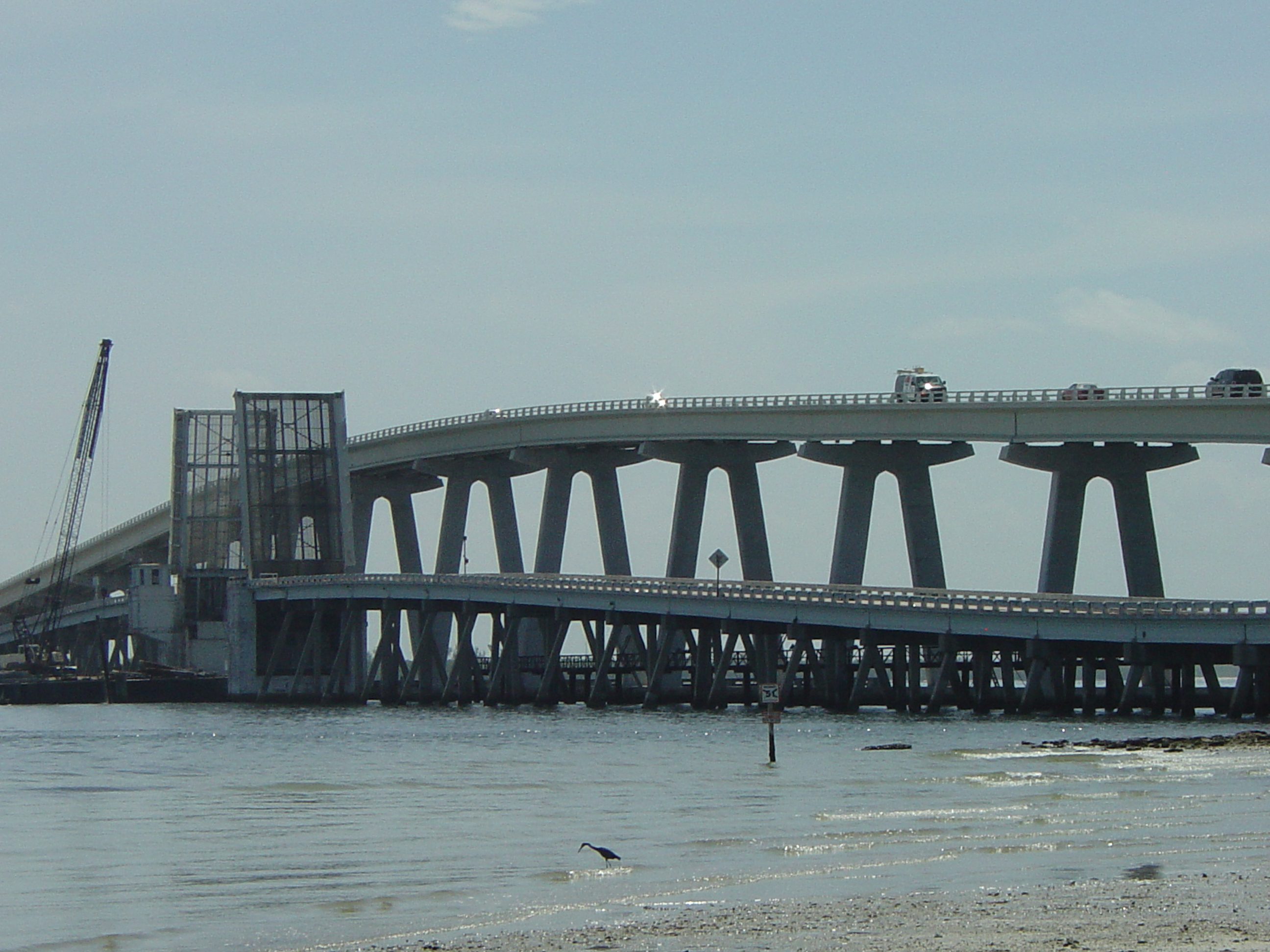
The old drawbridge next to the current Bridge A as seen prior to demolition

Once it was decided to replace the drawbridge, a debate ensued on replacing it with another drawbridge versus a high-level fixed-span bridge. The county wanted a high-span, while a number of Sanibel residents wanted another drawbridge. Shortly before construction was set to begin on the high-span bridge, the city filed a lawsuit against Lee County in an attempt to stop construction. Sanibel claimed that Lee County did not maintain the bridges properly and used the toll revenue for other road projects. Lee County then filed a counter-lawsuit, claiming Sanibel was interfering with construction. A second lawsuit against Lee County was filed by a group of Sanibel residents who created a non-profit organization called "Save Our Bay, Inc." All of the lawsuits delayed construction and were eventually dismissed.

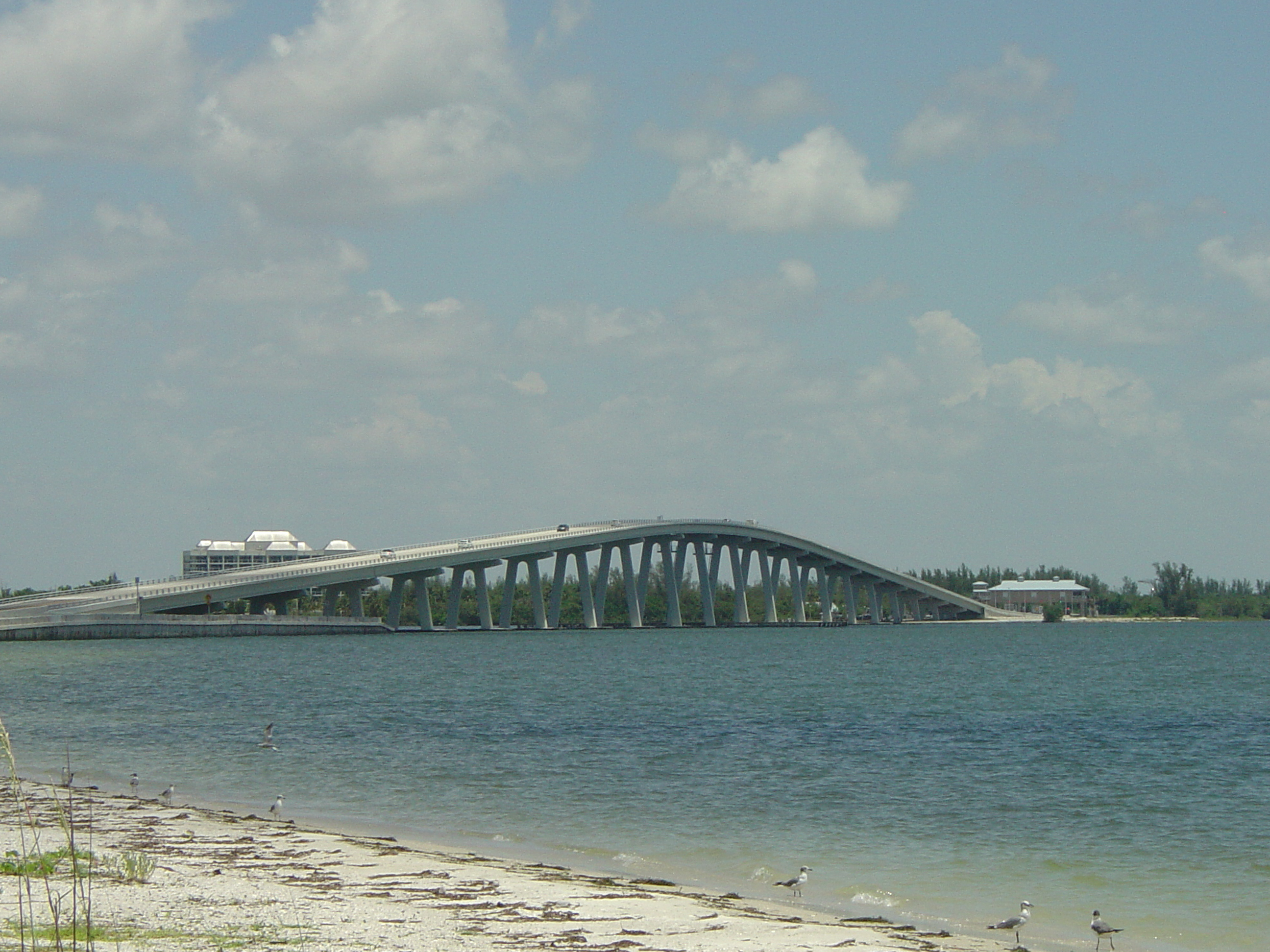
Bridge A in 2008

Construction of the current bridges commenced in May 2004. The lower level segments of the bridges were built taller than the original bridges to reduce corrosion from salt spray, which was one of the major factors in the deterioration of the original bridges. On August 13, 2004, the area was struck by Hurricane Charley, a Category 4 hurricane. The causeway received minor damage and was inspected before Sanibel residents were permitted to return to the island. In November 2004, the $3 toll was increased to $6 to finance construction. Construction on the current bridges lasted three years and cost $137 million.

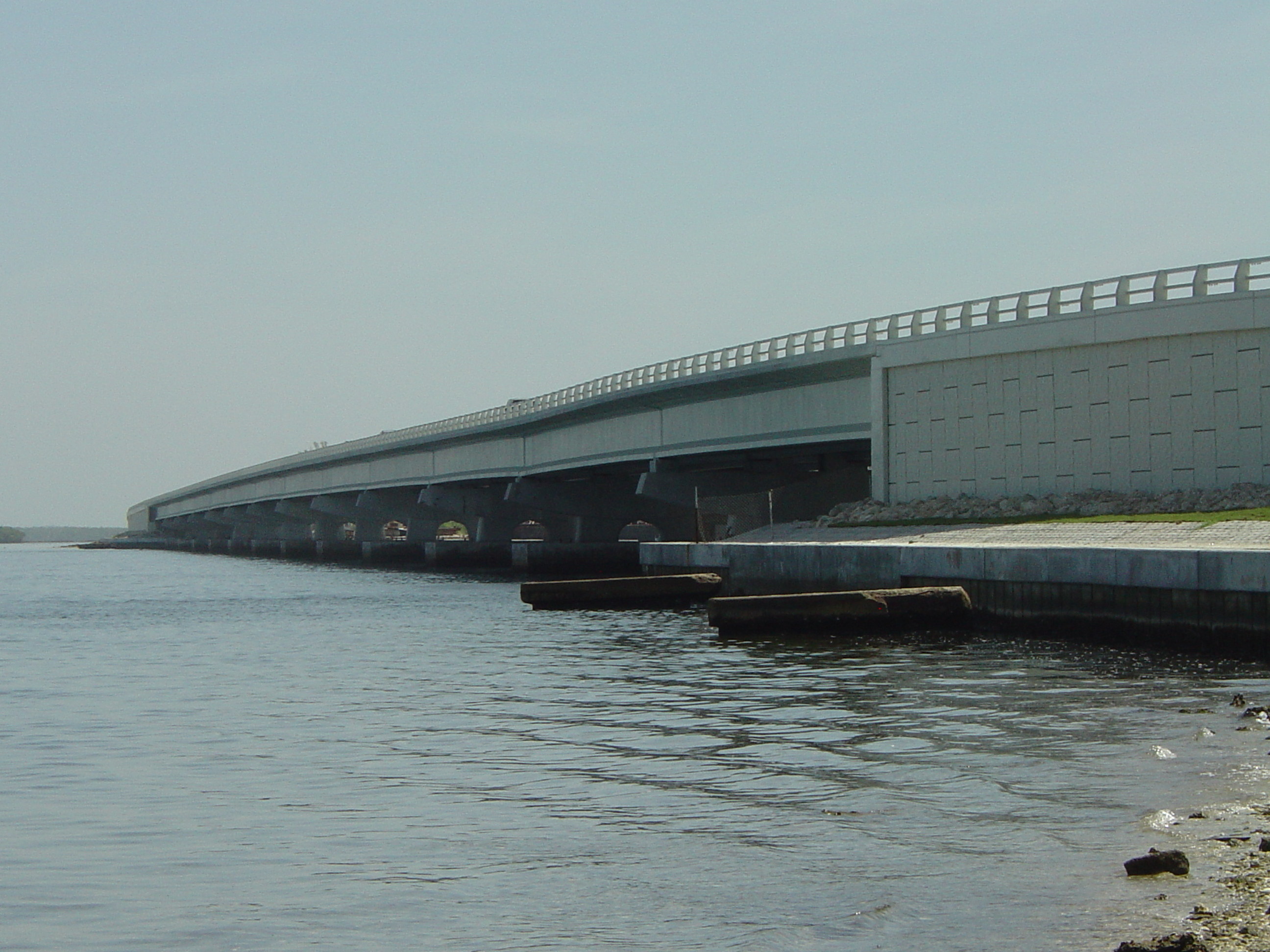
Bridge B in 2007

The first of the current bridges to open, Bridge B, opened for traffic on April 12, 2007. The current Bridge A opened for traffic on June 28, 2007, along with the current toll plaza. Bridge A is 70 feet (21 m) tall and stands as the tallest bridge in Lee County, which surpassed the nearby Matanzas Pass Bridge, which is 65 feet (20 m) tall. The following day, a private ceremony was held to commemorate the original drawbridge's final opening. The Sanibel-Captiva Optimists Club had held a raffle for the opportunity to be the operator of the drawbridge's machinery for its final opening. Seasonal Sanibel residents Bob and Ana Finks won the raffle, and they also got to keep the operating lever from the drawbridge's control room as part of the prize.

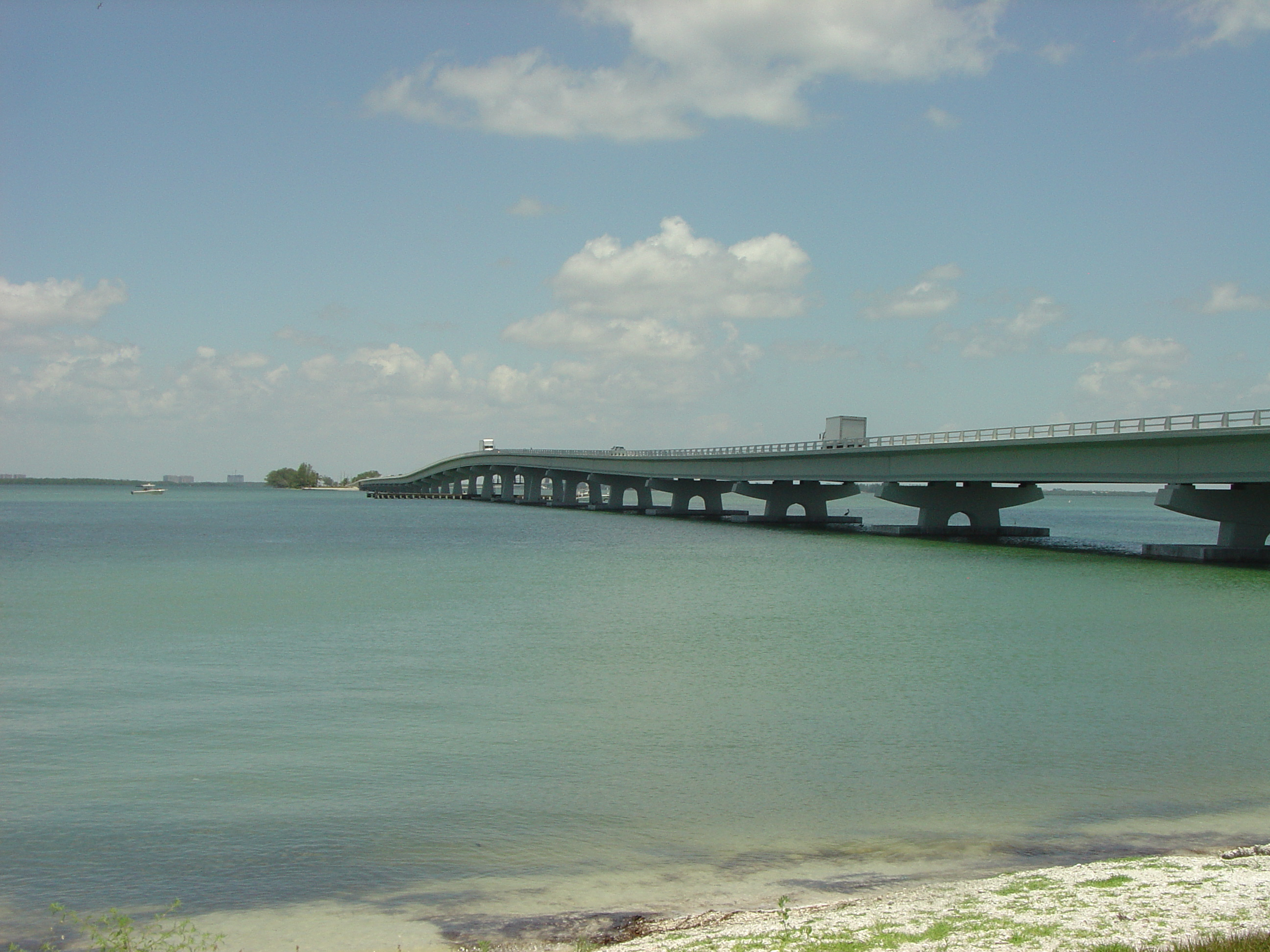
Bridge C in 2008

The current Bridge C opened for traffic on September 8, 2007. An official grand opening ceremony for the completion of the bridge replacement was held the same day.

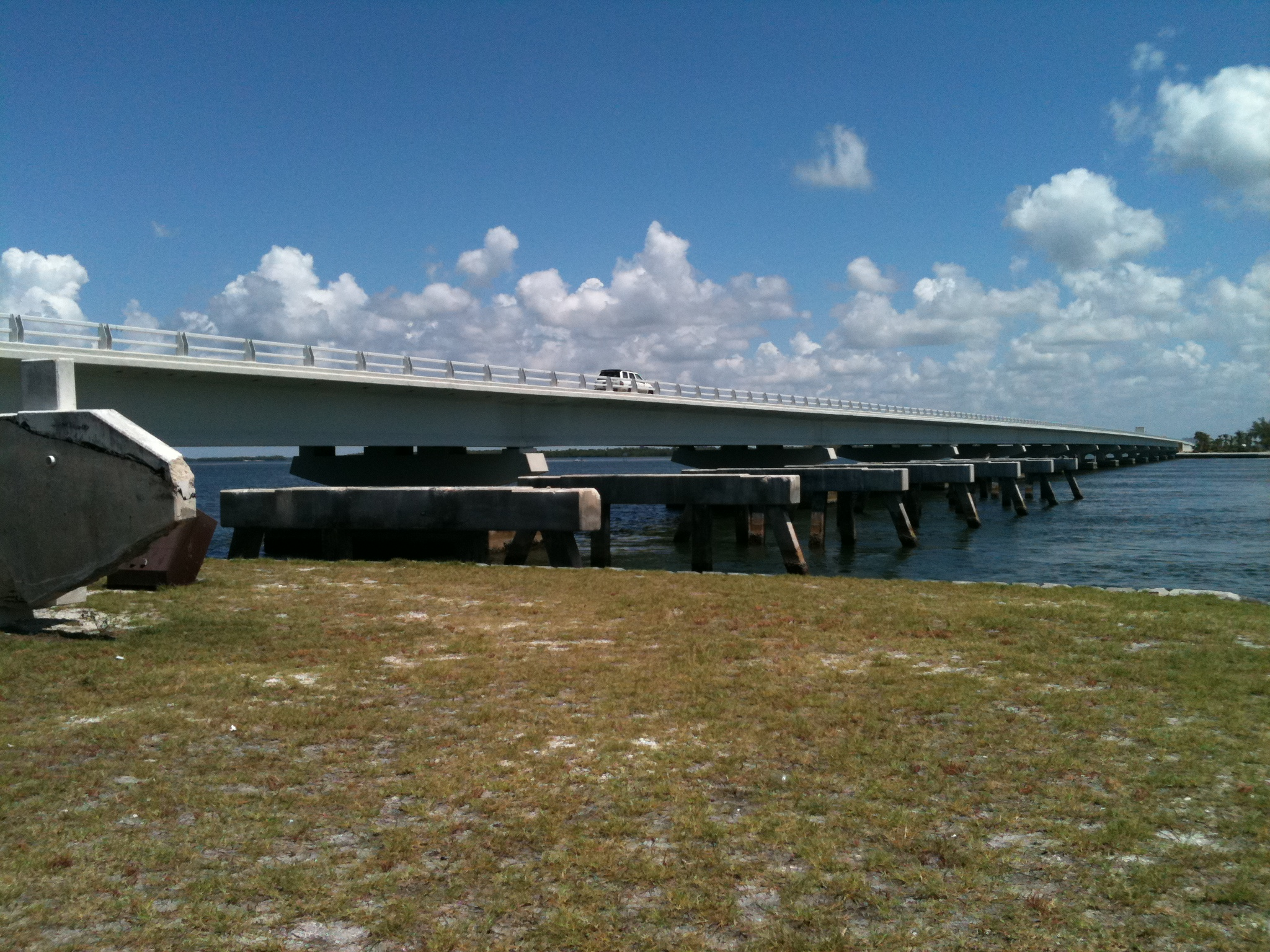
Remaining pilings from the original Bridge B in 2011

The original bridges was later demolished, and their remains sunk into the water to create artificial reefs in the San Carlos Bay and the Gulf of Mexico. However, the first few sets of piling from the original bridge B on the south shore were initially left in place. The pilings were planned to be removed but were left due to a grassroots campaign launched by local fisherman to have part of the span left intact for a fishing pier similar to the former spans of the Sunshine Skyway Bridge and the Overseas Highway. Despite the campaign initially succeeding, plans to install new deck sections on top of the pilings for the pier were scrapped in early 2010 due to budget cuts. The pilings have since been removed.

In March 2020, Lee County-owned toll bridges were temporarily transitioned to all-electronic tolling due to the COVID-19 pandemic. This change became permanent on June 23, 2021. The $3 administrative fee for vehicles without transponders was suspended during the pandemic and was reinstated on October 1. The motorcycle discount plans were removed as part of the plan for a permanent transition to all-electronic tolling.

=== Hurricane Ian ===
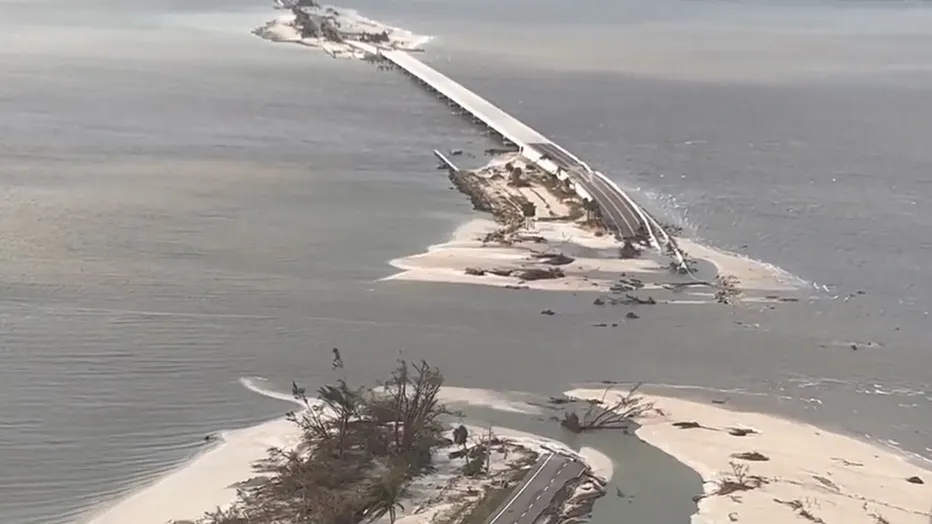
A destroyed section of the Sanibel causeway following Hurricane Ian

On September 28, 2022, Hurricane Ian partially destroyed the causeway, and the mainland approach was heavily damaged. Both the islands of Sanibel and Captiva were cut off from the mainland United States by road. No deaths or injuries were confirmed by the Lee County Sheriff's Office. After undergoing emergency repairs, the causeway reopened to trucks on October 11, and reopened to all vehicular traffic on October 20.

Permanent repairs to the causeway were completed in 2024. As part of this work, improvements were made to the causeway’s design to better withstand future storms without cutting off access to the mainland.

== Media references ==
In Blue Collar Comedy Tour: One for the Road (2006), comedian Ron White makes a reference to the old Sanibel Causeway bridge when he said he was pulled over for driving 11 mph (18 km/h) in a 5-mile-per-hour zone on one of the bridges. The speed limit was indeed reduced to 10 mph (16 km/h) on one of the bridges after speculation that the bridges were severely damaged from corrosion.

== See also ==
- Bonita Beach Causeway – a four-bridge causeway between Bonita Springs and Fort Myers Beach
- Matanzas Pass Bridge – connects Fort Myers Beach (on Estero Island) with the mainland
- Cape Coral Bridge – toll bridge that crosses the Caloosahatchee River
- Midpoint Memorial Bridge – another toll bridge that crosses the Caloosahatchee River
