= Midpoint Memorial Bridge =

Bridge in Florida, United States of America

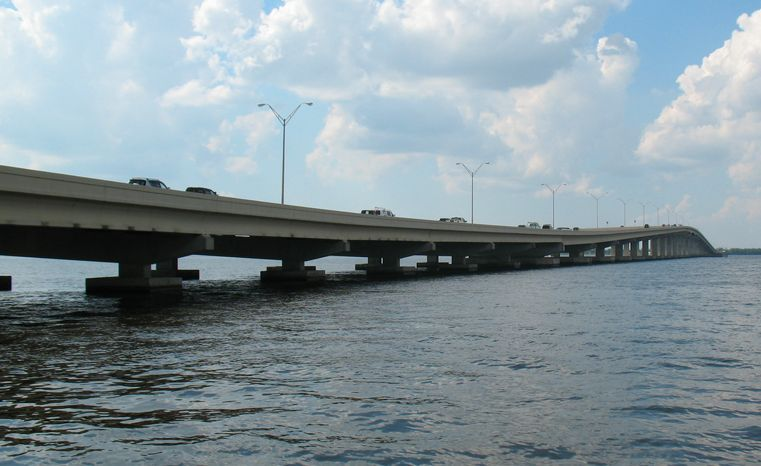
- Coordinates: 26°36′2.59″N 81°54′2.60″W
- Carries: CR 884
- Crosses: Caloosahatchee River
- Locale: Fort Myers and Cape Coral, Florida
- Other name: Midpoint Bridge
- Owner: Lee County
- Maintained by: Lee County
- ID number: 124096

Characteristics
- Design: Concrete girder
- Width: 81 feet (25 m)
- Longest span: 95 feet (29 m)
- Clearance below: 55 feet (17 m)
- No. of lanes: 4

History
- Construction cost: $175 million
- Opened: October 19, 1997; 28 years ago

Statistics
- Daily traffic: 57,350 (2023)
- Toll: $2 (westbound traffic only)

Location
- Interactive map of Midpoint Memorial Bridge

The Midpoint Memorial Bridge (often referred to as simply the Midpoint Bridge) is a bridge located in Southwest Florida. It spans the Caloosahatchee River, connecting Fort Myers and Cape Coral. It is a four-lane fixed span that is 1.125 miles (1.811 km) long. The bridge's name comes from serving as a midpoint or middle bridge for the Cape Coral bridges – Cape Coral Bridge is south, and the Caloosahatchee Bridge is located north. It carries County Road 884, which is known as Colonial Boulevard on the Fort Myers side, and Veterans Parkway on the Cape Coral side.

== History ==
Building a second bridge between Cape Coral and Fort Myers was first proposed in the 1970s, but construction was delayed for many years, largely due to opposition in Fort Myers. After a series of court battles, reaching the Florida Supreme Court, construction began in 1995, and the bridge opened for traffic on October 19, 1997. Earlier in 1959, the bridge's location was considered a possible location of the Cape Coral Bridge before its current location was determined.

The Midpoint Memorial Bridge was constructed as part of the extension of Colonial Boulevard into Cape Coral. Before construction, Colonial Boulevard terminated at State Road 867 (McGregor Boulevard), which runs parallel to the river. In Cape Coral, CR 884 (locally known as Veterans Parkway) now terminates at SR 78 (Pine Island Road) near Matlacha, and includes an overpass over the intersection with Del Prado Boulevard (CR 867A). The addition of the Midpoint Memorial Bridge resulted in several ancillary road projects in Fort Myers. Colonial Boulevard was widened to six lanes and overpasses were constructed over McGregor Boulevard and at the intersection with US 41.

The bridge is owned by the Lee County Department of Transportation. There is a two-dollar toll when using a transponder or five-dollar toll as a pay-by-plate for westbound vehicles only and no toll for eastbound traffic. Florida's statewide SunPass prepaid electronic toll collection system is accepted on the Midpoint Bridge, along with Lee County's Leeway prepaid toll system, which is also used on the Cape Coral Bridge and the Sanibel Causeway.

On the Cape Coral side of the bridge, there is a replica of the statue from the Marine Corps War Memorial in Rosslyn, Virginia (which is just outside Washington, D.C.). The statue depicts the six U.S Marines raising the American flag at the Battle of Iwo Jima. On the Fort Myers side, there is a small Vietnam War Memorial.

== Gallery ==
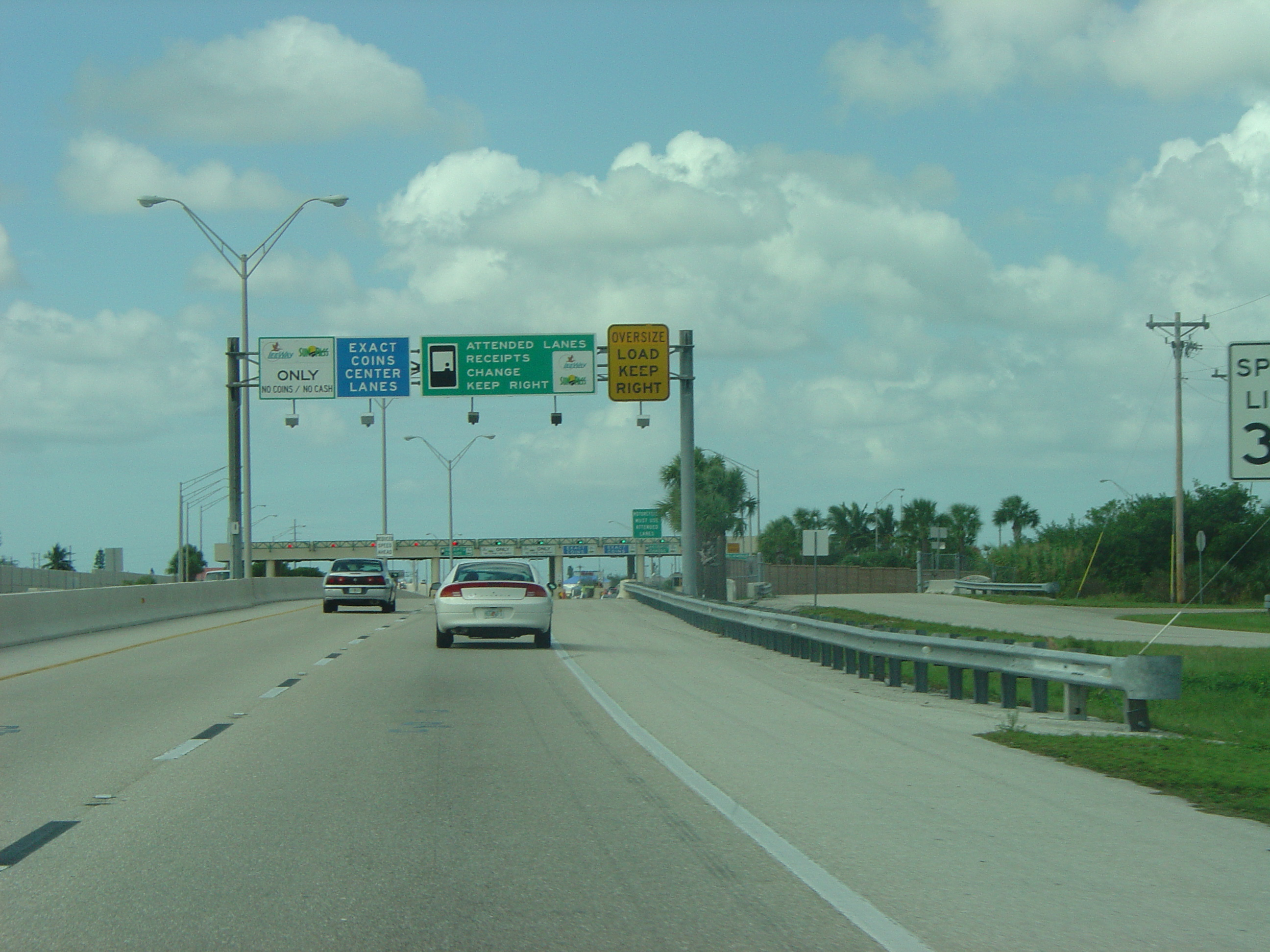
The Toll Plaza in 2007 when tolls were still two way

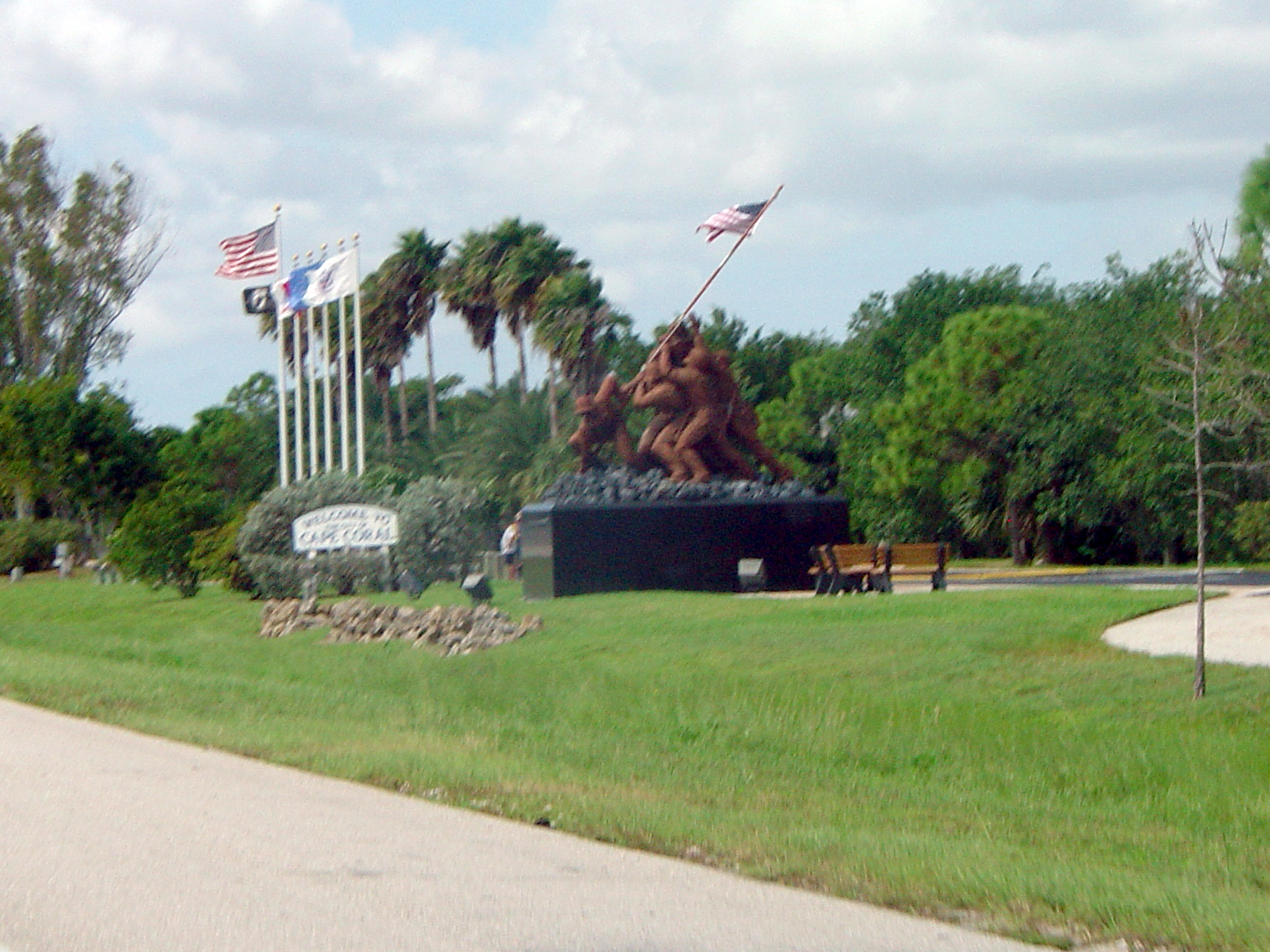
Iwo Jima Memorial replica on the Cape Coral side

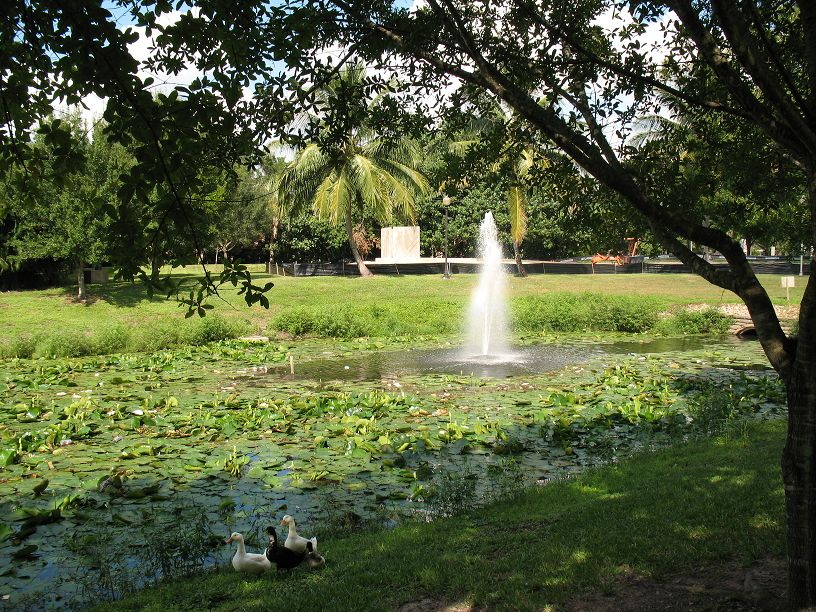
Vietnam War Memorial on the Fort Myers side under construction

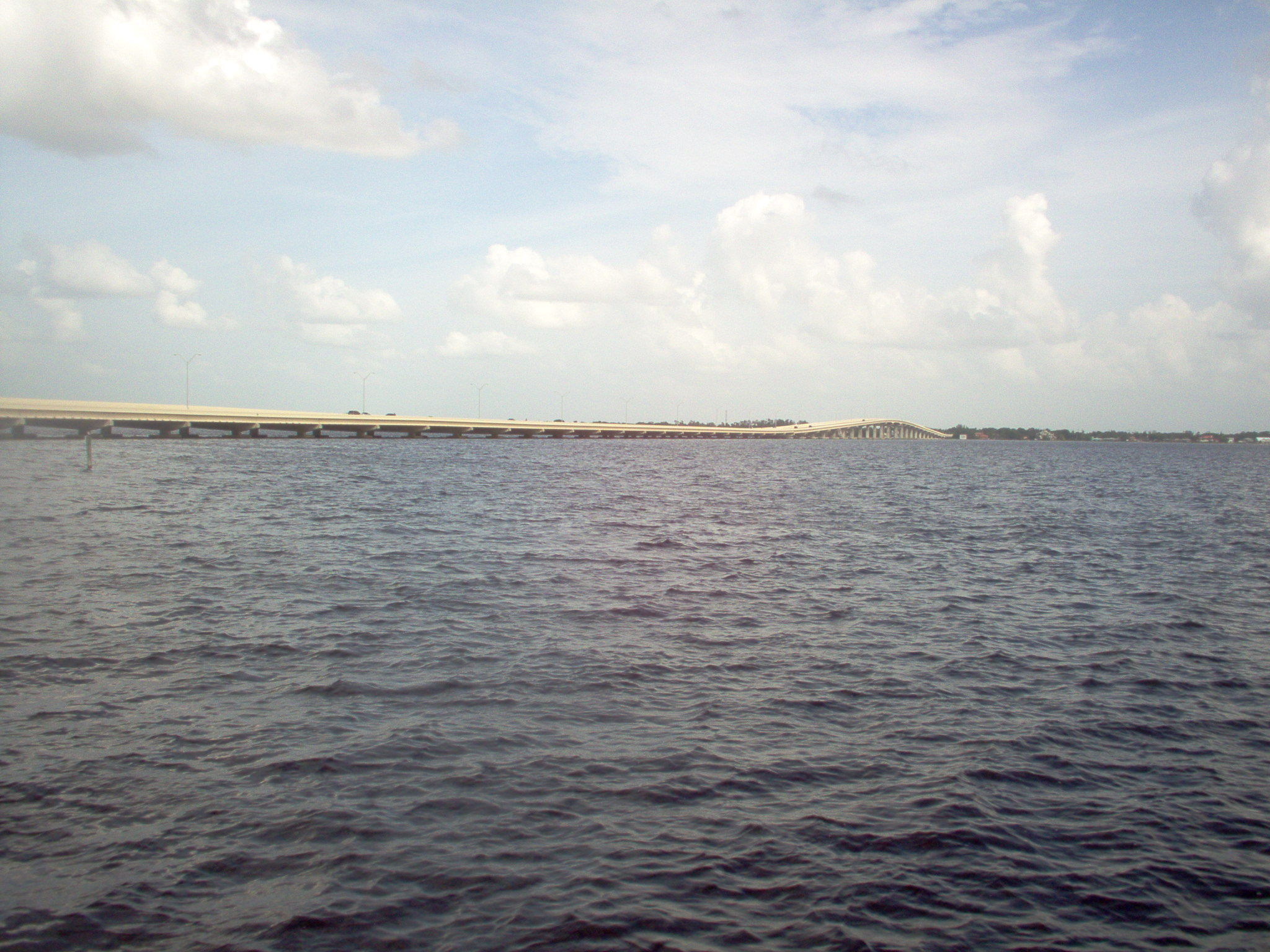
The bridge as seen from the Horton Park & Boat Ramp at the end of Everest Parkway in Cape Coral (2008)
