= Varanda =

Varanda may refer to:

- Historic name of Martuni Region of Nagorno-Karabakh
- Melikdom of Varanda, a historical Armenian principality in Nagorno-Karabakh
- Fizuli Rayon, Azerbaijan
- Qaradağlı, Khojavend, Azerbaijan
- The Armenian name of Fuzuli (city), a city in Azerbaijan

== See also ==
- Veranda (disambiguation)
