= Alva, Florida =

- Census-designated place
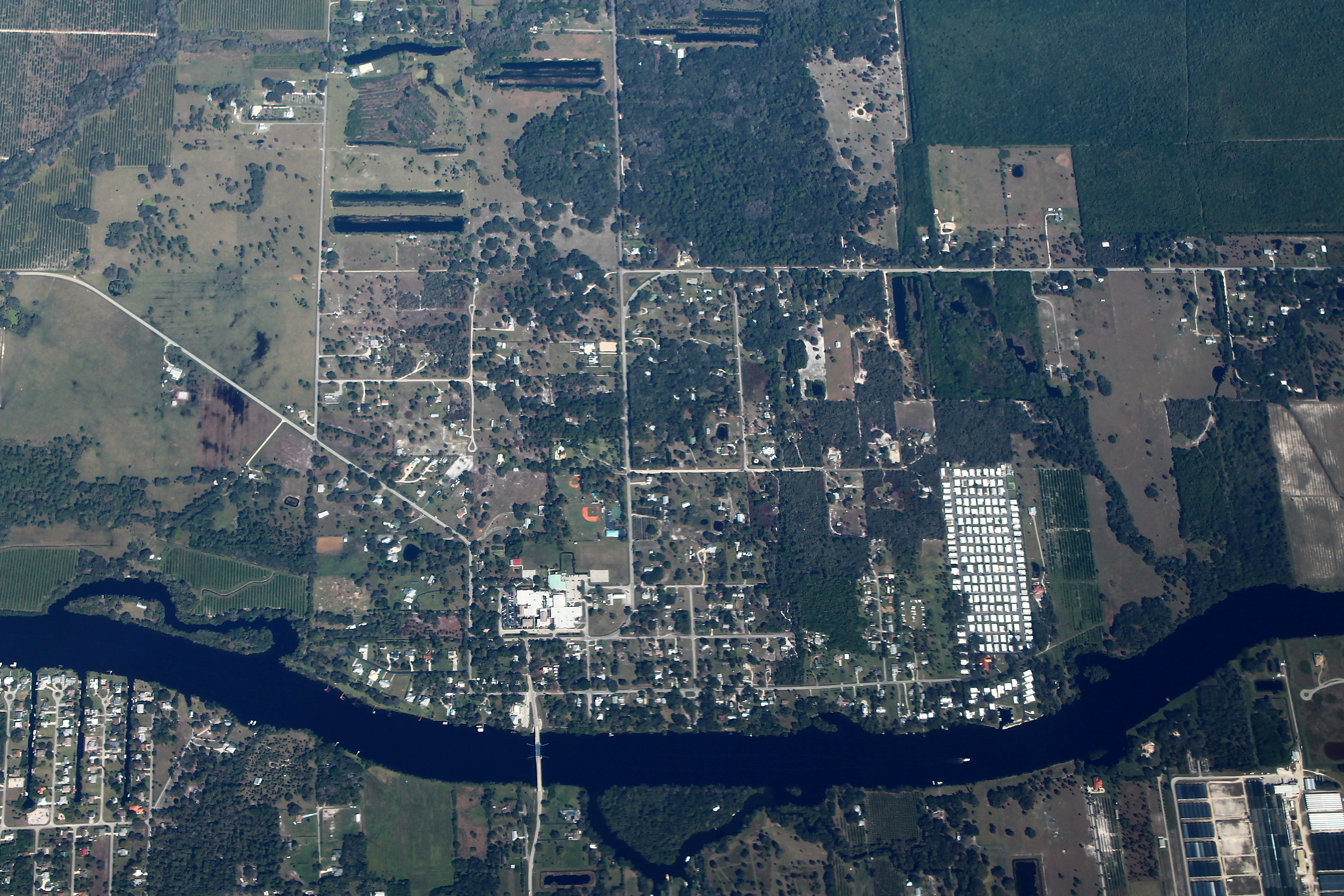
- An aerial view of the town.

- Location in Lee County, Florida
- Coordinates: 26°43′37″N 81°36′43″W
- Country: United States
- State: Florida
- County: Lee

Area
  - Total: 18.41 sq mi (47.68 km^{2})
  - Land: 17.45 sq mi (45.20 km^{2})
  - Water: 0.96 sq mi (2.48 km^{2})
- Elevation: 3 ft (0.91 m)

Population (2020)
  - Total: 2,725
  - Density: 156.1/sq mi (60.28/km^{2})
- Time zone: UTC-5 (Eastern (EST))
  - Summer (DST): UTC-4 (EDT)
- ZIP code: 33920
- Area code: 239
- FIPS code: 12-01125
- GNIS feature ID: 2402642
- Website: http://www.alvafl.org/

Alva is an unincorporated community and census-designated place (CDP) in Lee County, Florida, United States, situated on the Caloosahatchee River. The population was 2,725 at the 2020 census, up from 2,596 at the 2010 census. It is part of the Cape Coral-Fort Myers, Florida Metropolitan Statistical Area.

== Geography ==
Alva is located in the northeast corner of Lee County. It is bordered to the west by Olga, to the south by Lehigh Acres, and to the east by the community of Fort Denaud in Hendry County. Florida State Road 80 passes through Alva, leading east 12 miles (19 km) to LaBelle and west 18 miles (29 km) to the center of Fort Myers.

According to the United States Census Bureau, the CDP has a total area of 18.4 square miles (47.7 km^{2}), of which 17.5 square miles (45.2 km^{2}) are land and 0.97 square miles (2.5 km^{2}), or 5.23%, are water. The Caloosahatchee River flows from east to west through the center of the community.

== Demographics ==
Historical population
Census	Pop.	Note	%±
2000	2,182		—
2010	2,596		19.0%
2020	2,725		5.0%
U.S. Decennial Census

=== 2020 census ===
As of the 2020 census, Alva had a population of 2,725. The median age was 51.7 years. 15.7% of residents were under the age of 18 and 28.2% of residents were 65 years of age or older. For every 100 females there were 100.5 males, and for every 100 females age 18 and over there were 98.8 males age 18 and over.

0.0% of residents lived in urban areas, while 100.0% lived in rural areas.

There were 1,083 households in Alva, of which 22.5% had children under the age of 18 living in them. Of all households, 57.9% were married-couple households, 16.1% were households with a male householder and no spouse or partner present, and 19.0% were households with a female householder and no spouse or partner present. About 22.7% of all households were made up of individuals and 12.8% had someone living alone who was 65 years of age or older.

There were 1,269 housing units, of which 14.7% were vacant. The homeowner vacancy rate was 1.9% and the rental vacancy rate was 9.8%.

Racial composition as of the 2020 census
Race	Number	Percent
White	2,469	90.6%
Black or African American	11	0.4%
American Indian and Alaska Native	14	0.5%
Asian	13	0.5%
Native Hawaiian and Other Pacific Islander	0	0.0%
Some other race	52	1.9%
Two or more races	166	6.1%
Hispanic or Latino (of any race)	174	6.4%

=== 2010 census ===
According to the 2010 census, the population was 2,596, 96.47% of whom were white, 0.35% African American, 0.50% Asian, 0.31% Native American, 0.58% mixed race, and 0.81% other single race.

=== 2000 census ===
As of the census of 2000, there were 2,182 people, 912 households, and 673 families residing in the CDP. The population density was 121.5 inhabitants per square mile (46.9/km^{2}). There were 1,017 housing units at an average density of 56.7 per square mile (21.9/km^{2}). The racial makeup of the CDP was 96.33% White, 0.18% African American, 0.32% Native American, 0.18% Asian, 0.14% Pacific Islander, 1.24% from other races, and 1.60% from two or more races. Hispanic or Latino of any race were 2.89% of the population.

There were 912 households, out of which 22.7% had children under the age of 18 living with them, 64.9% were married couples living together, 5.9% had a female householder with no husband present, and 26.2% were non-families. 21.5% of all households were made up of individuals, and 12.4% had someone living alone who was 65 years of age or older. The average household size was 2.39 and the average family size was 2.73.

In the CDP, the population was spread out, with 18.9% under the age of 18, 4.1% from 18 to 24, 22.1% from 25 to 44, 31.7% from 45 to 64, and 23.2% who were 65 years of age or older. The median age was 48 years. For every 100 females, there were 96.9 males. For every 100 females age 18 and over, there were 96.1 males.

The median income for a household in the CDP was $41,938, and the median income for a family was $48,073. Males had a median income of $35,300 versus $25,656 for females. The per capita income for the CDP was $24,353. About 5.9% of families and 7.8% of the population were below the poverty line, including 15.4% of those under age 18 and 2.7% of those age 65 or over.

== Historic library and museum ==
Alva is the home of a small library dating back to 1909 and a chapel that opened in 1901. The Alva Library was the first library in what is today Lee County and was constructed in the classical revival style.

The Alva Library grew from the private Alva Book Club into the first public library in southwest Florida, thanks in part to donation of land from Captain Peter Nelson. The founder of the book club and Alva's first librarian was Esther Hovey. The library closed in 1937, but the building continued in use over the years for various purposes such as high school art classes and a community center. In 1974, the Alva Garden Club turned the building into a museum with the Library Association trustees' permission.

Both the library and the 1901 chapel are open to the public and house the town's nonprofit museum, featuring Seminole artifacts and objects from the town's founding families.

== Notable people ==
- Chad Chastain (1998–) current part-time driver in the NASCAR Craftsman Truck Series for Niece Motorsports
- Ross Chastain (1992–) current NASCAR Cup Series driver for the Trackhouse Racing Team
- Mindy McCready (1975–2013), former American Country Music Artist, buried in Alva
