= Caloosahatchee River =

River on the southwest coast of Florida, US

Coordinates: 26.5170225°N 82.0331467°W

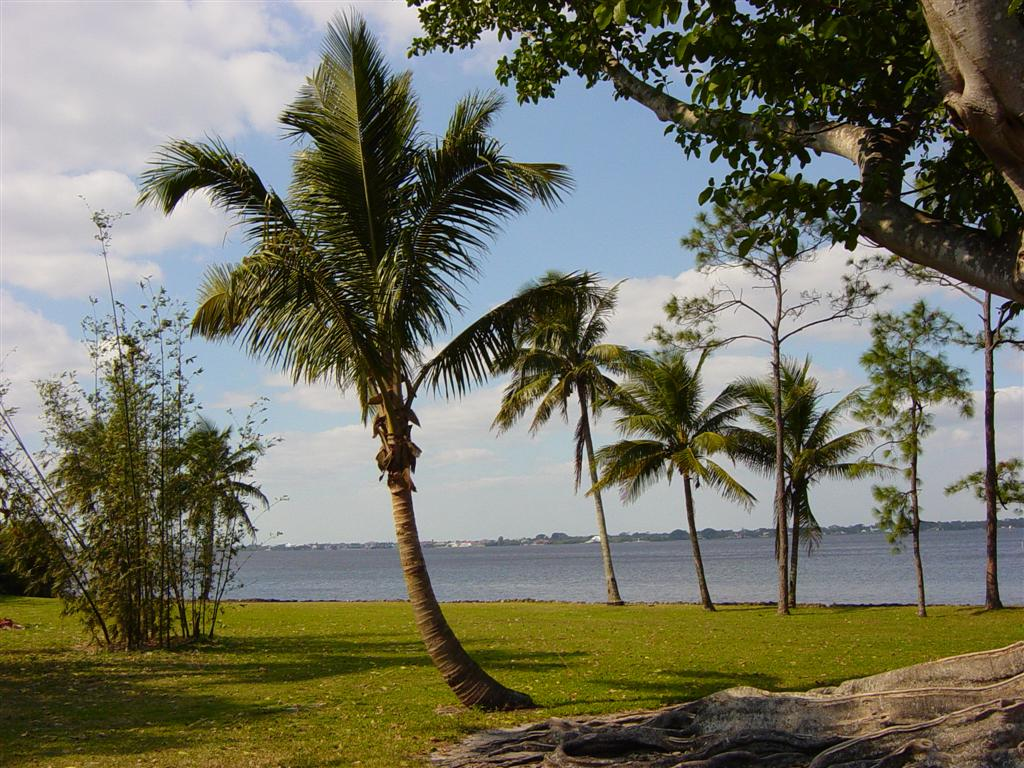
Caloosahatchee River

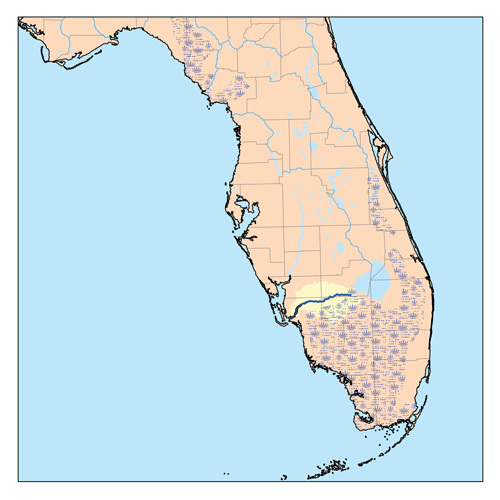

The Caloosahatchee River is a river on the southwest Gulf Coast of Florida in the United States, approximately 67 miles (108 km) long. It drains rural areas on the northern edge of the Everglades, east of Fort Myers. An important link in the Okeechobee Waterway, a manmade inland waterway system of southern Florida, the river forms a tidal estuary along most of its course and has become the subject of efforts to restore and preserve the Everglades.

== Description ==
The river issues from Lake Hicpochee, in southeastern Glades County, approximately 10 mi (16 km) west of Clewiston. It flows west-southwest past LaBelle, where it becomes tidal, forming an estuary along its lower 25 mi (40 km). It broadens as it nears the gulf, passing Fort Myers and Cape Coral. It enters the Gulf of Mexico 10 mi (16 km) southwest of Fort Myers in San Carlos Bay, protected by Sanibel Island.

The 5 mi (8 km) C-43 Caloosahatchee Canal connecting Lake Hicpochee to Lake Okeechobee allows continuous navigation from the Caloosahatchee to the Okeechobee Waterway system; oxbow lakes mark isolated stretches of the original waterway. In 2013, heavy rains in southern Florida resulted in high runoff into Lake Okeechobee; rising lake levels forced the United States Army Corps of Engineers to release large volumes of polluted water from the lake through the St. Lucie River estuary to the east and the Caloosahatchee River estuary to the west. Thus, the normal mix of fresh and salt water in those estuaries was replaced by a flood of polluted fresh water resulting in ecological damage.

Until late in the 19th century, the Caloosahatchee River was fed by a series of lakes starting from Lake Hicpochee, and including Lettuce Lake, Bonnet Lake and Flirt Lake. A waterfall and set of rapids at the lower end of Flirt Lake marked the beginning of the river. The rapids were close to 1 mile (1.6 km) long, with a drop in elevation of about 10 feet (3.0 m). Lake Hicpochee, about 9,000 acres (3,600 ha) in area, was only 3 miles (4.8 km) from Lake Okeechobee, but there was no connection between the two lakes before the late 19th century. Water flowed from Lake Hicpochee westward into Lettuce Lake and then Bonnet Lake. When the water was high, the two lakes merged. From Bonnet Lake, water flowed into Lake Flirt, which was about 1,000 acres (400 ha) in area and 5 miles (8.0 km) long. All of the lakes were surrounded by extensive wetlands.

In 1881, Hamilton Disston, as part of a scheme to drain large areas of wetlands in the interior of Florida, had a canal dredged from Lake Okeechobee to Lake Hicpochee and through the lakes and wetlands to the west. His company removed the rock ledge that formed the falls and rapids below Lake Flirt and straightened the upper reaches of the Caloosahatchee River. Various state and federal projects have widened and deepened the river since then. The conversion of the Caloosahatchee River into a canal drained Lake Flirt and the wetlands descending from Lake Hicpochee.

Since the late 19th century, dredging and channelization of the river, as well as the artificial connection to Lake Okeechobee and its use as a water supply for urban and agricultural uses, have substantially altered the hydrology of the river. As a result, both the magnitude and timing of water delivery to the estuary have been substantially altered. Recent programs by the state government have attempted to establish minimum flow levels in the river, in part to help restore the water supply to the Everglades. A federal wildlife refuge for manatees has been established at the mouth of the river on San Carlos Bay near Fort Myers.

== Crossings ==
The following is a list of bridge crossings of the Caloosahatchee River and Canal

| Bridge | Route | Location | Notes |
|---|---|---|---|
| | South Central Florida Express, Inc. | Moore Haven | Swing Bridge |
| Mamie Langdale Memorial Bridge | US 27 | Moore Haven |
| LaBelle Drawbridge | SR 29 | LaBelle | Bascule Bridge |
| Fort Denaud Bridge | Fort Denaud Road | Fort Denaud | Swing Bridge |
| Alva Bridge | Broadway | Alva | Bascule Bridge |
| Wilson Pigott Bridge | SR 31 | Fort Myers Shores | Bascule Bridge |
| | I-75 | Tice |
| | Seminole Gulf Railway | Tice | Bascule Bridge |
| Edison Bridge | US 41 Bus. / SR 739 | Fort Myers |
| Caloosahatchee Bridge | US 41 | Fort Myers |
| Midpoint Memorial Bridge | CR 884 | Cape Coral |
| Cape Coral Bridge | CR 867A | Cape Coral |

== Gallery ==
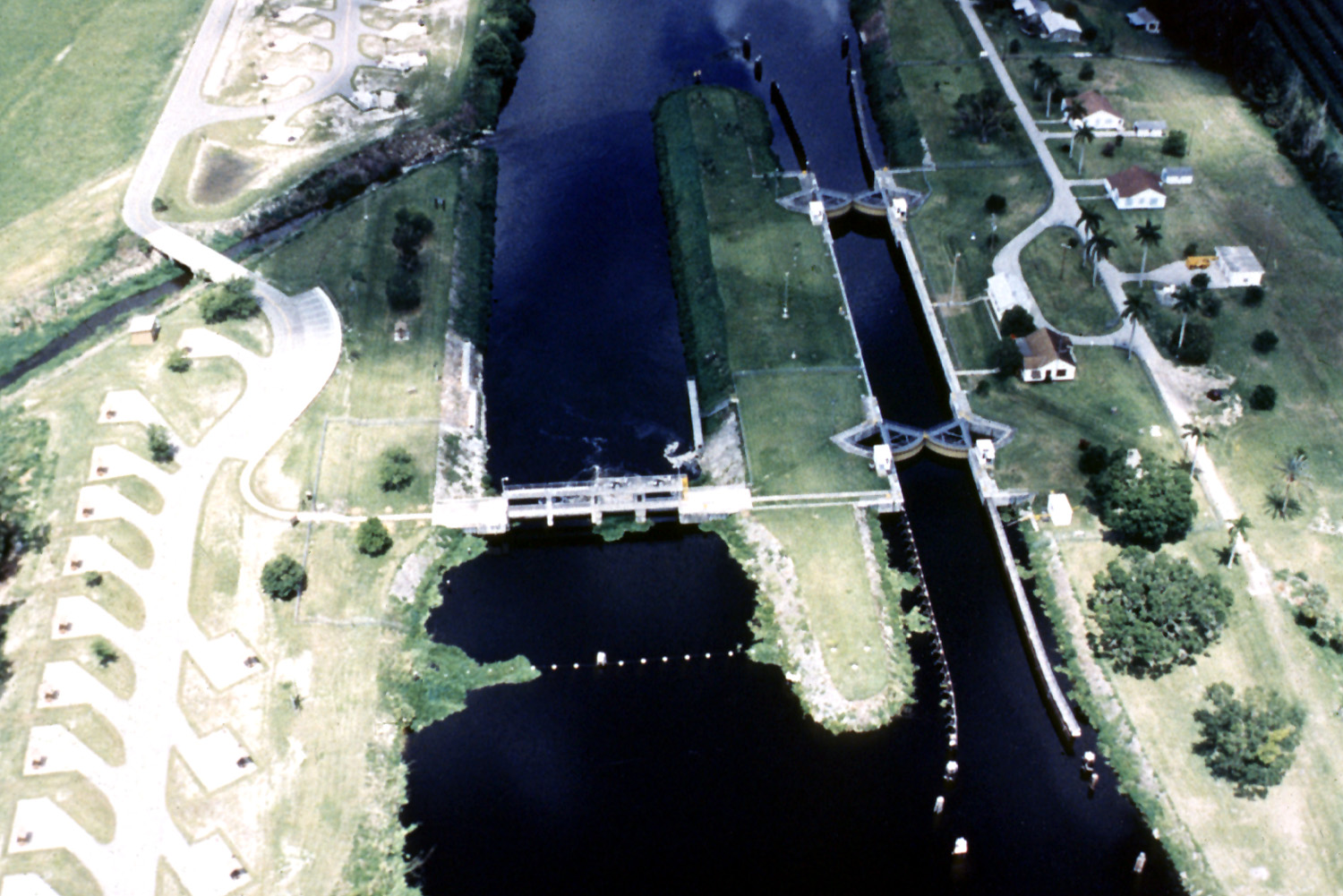
Ortona Lock and Dam on the Caloosahatchee River, part of the Okeechobee Waterway, in Glades County, Florida

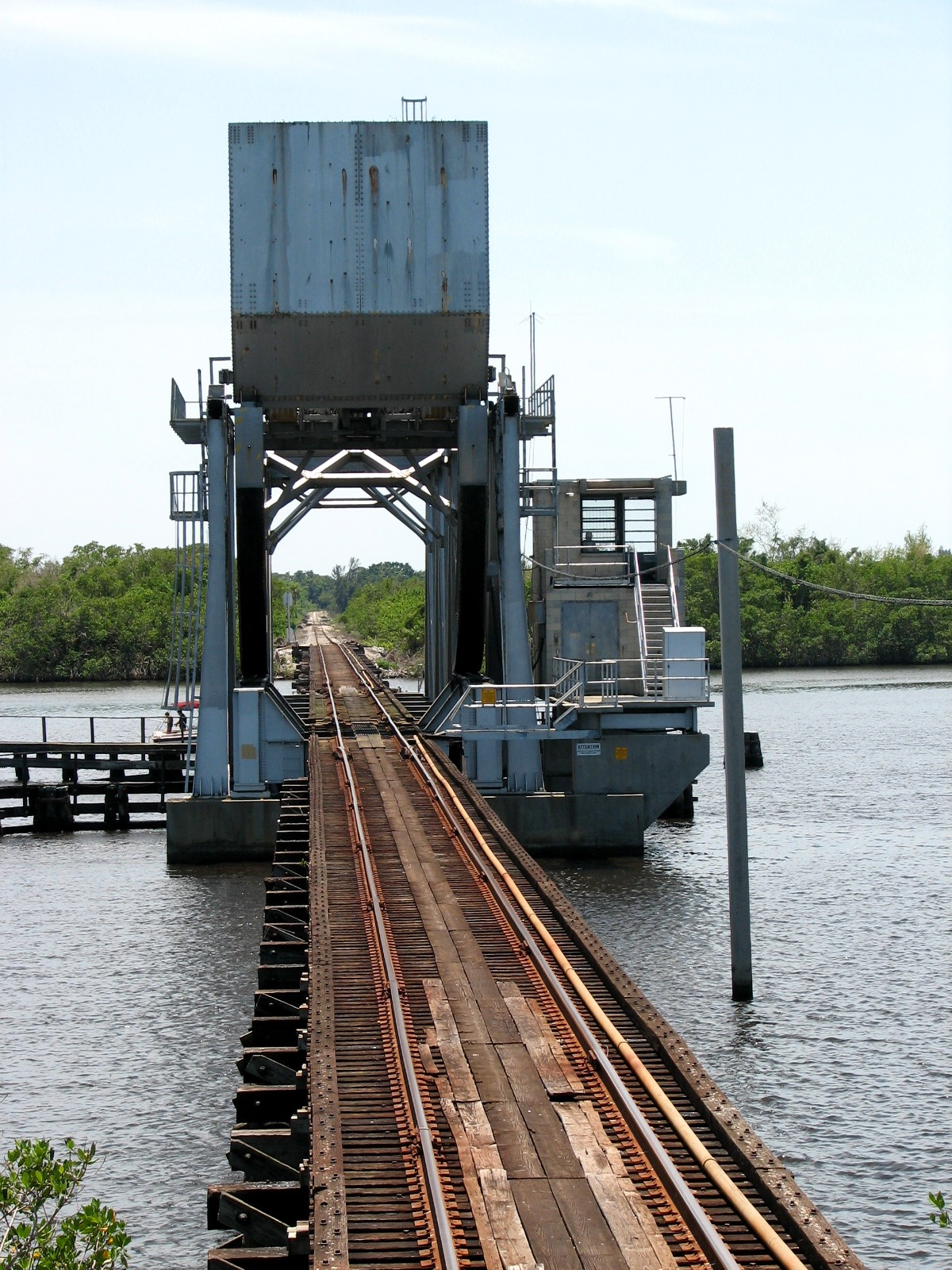
Seminole Gulf Railway spans the Caloosahatchee River near Tice, Florida.

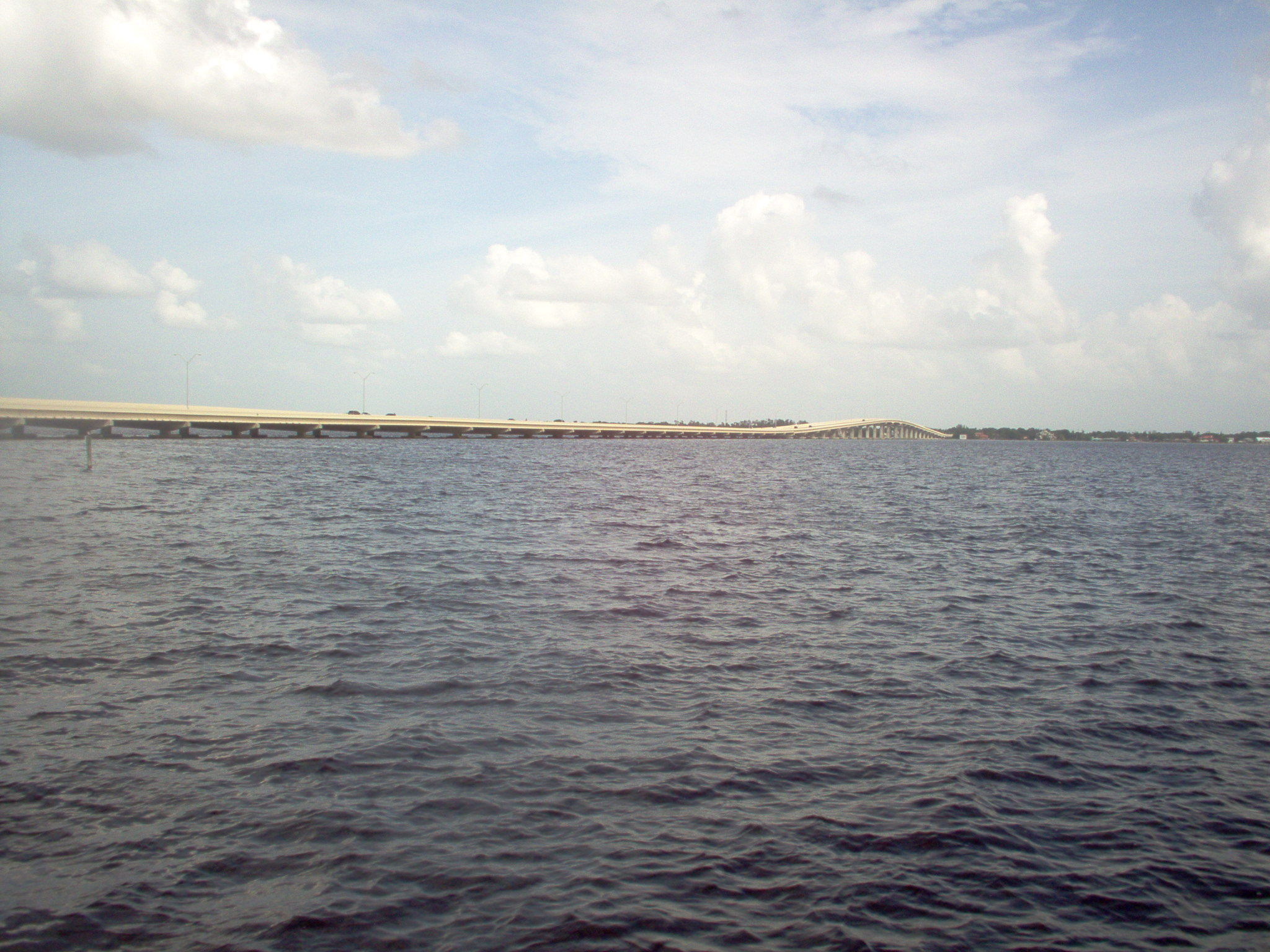
The Midpoint Memorial Bridge spanning the river and connecting the cities of Cape Coral and Fort Myers (2008).

== See also ==
- South Atlantic-Gulf Water Resource Region
