= Olga, Florida =

- Census-designated place
- Location in Lee County and the state of Florida
- Coordinates: 26°42′41″N 81°41′42″W
- Country: United States
- State: Florida
- County: Lee

Area
  - Total: 4.42 sq mi (11.45 km^{2})
  - Land: 4.21 sq mi (10.91 km^{2})
  - Water: 0.20 sq mi (0.53 km^{2})
- Elevation: 7 ft (2.1 m)

Population (2020)
  - Total: 2,270
  - Density: 538.6/sq mi (207.97/km^{2})
- Time zone: UTC-5 (Eastern (EST))
  - Summer (DST): UTC-4 (EDT)
- FIPS code: 12-51400
- GNIS feature ID: 2403375

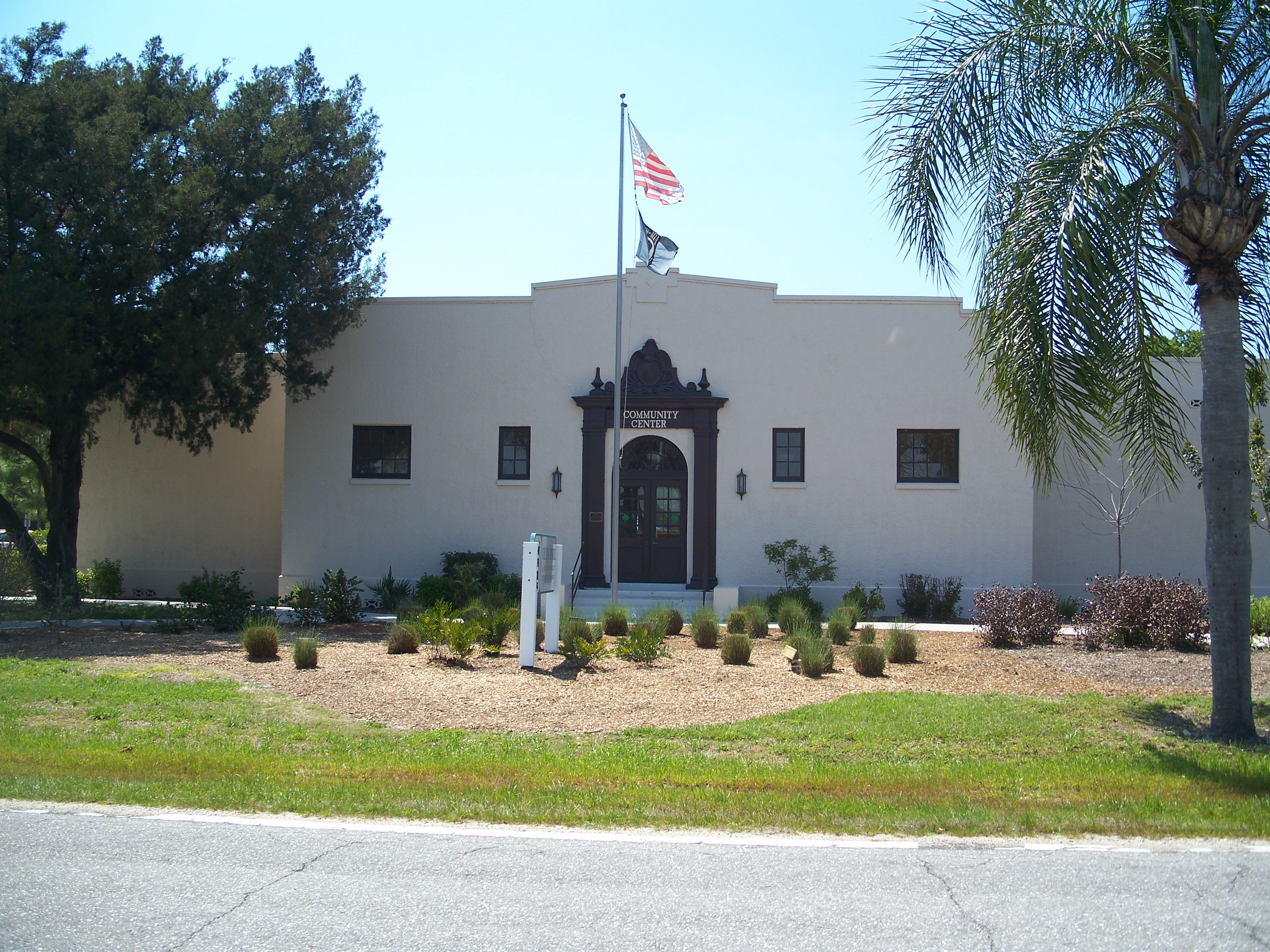
Old Olga School, now a community center

Olga is an unincorporated community and census-designated place (CDP) in Lee County, Florida, United States. The population was 2,270 at the 2020 census, up from 1,952 at the 2010 census. It is part of the Cape Coral-Fort Myers, Florida Metropolitan Statistical Area.

== Geography ==
Olga is located in northeastern Lee County on the south side of the Caloosahatchee River. It is bordered to the east and north by Alva and to the west by Fort Myers Shores. Florida State Road 80 passes through the CDP, leading southwest 11 miles (18 km) to the center of Fort Myers, the county seat, and east 18 miles (29 km) to LaBelle.

According to the United States Census Bureau, the Olga CDP has a total area of 4.4 square miles (11.4 km^{2}), of which 4.2 square miles (10.9 km^{2}) are land and 0.2 square miles (0.5 km^{2}), or 4.49%, are water.

== Demographics ==
Historical population
Census	Pop.	Note	%±
2000	1,398		—
2010	1,952		39.6%
2020	2,270		16.3%
U.S. Decennial Census

=== 2020 census ===
As of the 2020 census, Olga had a population of 2,270. The median age was 46.0 years. 19.3% of residents were under the age of 18 and 22.5% of residents were 65 years of age or older. For every 100 females there were 97.7 males, and for every 100 females age 18 and over there were 96.4 males age 18 and over.

79.5% of residents lived in urban areas, while 20.5% lived in rural areas.

There were 889 households in Olga, of which 27.8% had children under the age of 18 living in them. Of all households, 51.1% were married-couple households, 16.8% were households with a male householder and no spouse or partner present, and 25.3% were households with a female householder and no spouse or partner present. About 22.8% of all households were made up of individuals and 11.3% had someone living alone who was 65 years of age or older.

There were 968 housing units, of which 8.2% were vacant. The homeowner vacancy rate was 2.1% and the rental vacancy rate was 7.6%.

Racial composition as of the 2020 census
Race	Number	Percent
White	1,749	77.0%
Black or African American	81	3.6%
American Indian and Alaska Native	2	0.1%
Asian	63	2.8%
Native Hawaiian and Other Pacific Islander	0	0.0%
Some other race	93	4.1%
Two or more races	282	12.4%
Hispanic or Latino (of any race)	375	16.5%

=== 2000 census ===
As of the census of 2000, there were 1,398 people, 515 households, and 402 families residing in the CDP. The population density was 329.0 inhabitants per square mile (127.0/km^{2}). There were 553 housing units at an average density of 130.1 per square mile (50.2/km^{2}). The racial makeup of the CDP was 90.34% White, 2.36% African American, 0.36% Native American, 1.22% Asian, 4.43% from other races, and 1.29% from two or more races. 9.08% of the population were Hispanic or Latino of any race.

There were 515 households, out of which 36.3% had children under the age of 18 living with them, 61.9% were married couples living together, 12.6% had a female householder with no husband present, and 21.9% were non-families. 18.1% of all households were made up of individuals, and 7.4% had someone living alone who was 65 years of age or older. The average household size was 2.71 and the average family size was 3.04.

In the CDP, the population was spread out, with 26.3% under the age of 18, 7.4% from 18 to 24, 29.1% from 25 to 44, 24.5% from 45 to 64, and 12.7% who were 65 years of age or older. The median age was 38 years. For every 100 females, there were 96.3 males. For every 100 females age 18 and over, there were 96.2 males.

The median income for a household in the CDP was $55,000, and the median income for a family was $57,298. Males had a median income of $31,604 versus $23,333 for females. The per capita income for the CDP was $19,826. 4.0% of the population and 4.0% of families were below the poverty line. Out of the total population, 4.5% of those under the age of 18 and none of those 65 and older were living below the poverty line.
