= Fort Myers Shores, Florida =

- Census-designated place
- Location in Lee County and the state of Florida
- Coordinates: 26°42′42″N 81°44′47″W
- Country: United States
- State: Florida
- County: {Lee

Area
  - Total: 2.54 sq mi (6.59 km^{2})
  - Land: 2.07 sq mi (5.37 km^{2})
  - Water: 0.47 sq mi (1.21 km^{2})
- Elevation: 3 ft (0.91 m)

Population (2020)
  - Total: 5,774
  - Density: 2,783.5/sq mi (1,074.73/km^{2})
- Time zone: UTC-5 (Eastern (EST))
  - Summer (DST): UTC-4 (EDT)
- FIPS code: 12-24175
- GNIS feature ID: 2402498

Fort Myers Shores is an unincorporated community and census-designated place (CDP) in Lee County, Florida, United States. The population was 5,774 at the 2020 census, up from 5,487 at the 2010 census. It is part of the Cape Coral-Fort Myers, Florida Metropolitan Statistical Area.

== Geography ==
Fort Myers Shores is located in northeastern Lee County on the south side of the Caloosahatchee River. It is bordered to the east by Olga. Florida State Road 80 forms the southern edge of the community, leading east 20 miles (32 km) to LaBelle and southwest 10 miles (16 km) to the center of Fort Myers, the Lee county seat. State Road 31 forms the western edge of the community, leading north 38 miles (61 km) to Arcadia.

According to the United States Census Bureau, the Fort Myers Shores CDP has a total area of 2.5 square miles (6.6 km^{2}), of which 2.1 square miles (5.4 km^{2}) are land and 0.5 square miles (1.2 km^{2}), or 18.42%, are water.

== Demographics ==
Historical population
Census	Pop.	Note	%±
1980	4,426		—
1990	5,460		23.4%
2000	5,793		6.1%
2010	5,487		−5.3%
2020	5,774		5.2%

=== 2020 census ===
As of the 2020 census, Fort Myers Shores had a population of 5,774. The median age was 44.8 years. 20.4% of residents were under the age of 18 and 20.3% of residents were 65 years of age or older. For every 100 females there were 102.0 males, and for every 100 females age 18 and over there were 97.6 males age 18 and over.

99.0% of residents lived in urban areas, while 1.0% lived in rural areas.

There were 2,369 households in Fort Myers Shores, of which 25.3% had children under the age of 18 living in them. Of all households, 43.0% were married-couple households, 20.9% were households with a male householder and no spouse or partner present, and 27.1% were households with a female householder and no spouse or partner present. About 26.4% of all households were made up of individuals and 13.0% had someone living alone who was 65 years of age or older.

There were 2,624 housing units, of which 9.7% were vacant. The homeowner vacancy rate was 2.8% and the rental vacancy rate was 3.7%.

Racial composition as of the 2020 census
Race	Number	Percent
White	3,737	64.7%
Black or African American	309	5.4%
American Indian and Alaska Native	31	0.5%
Asian	78	1.4%
Native Hawaiian and Other Pacific Islander	0	0.0%
Some other race	696	12.1%
Two or more races	923	16.0%
Hispanic or Latino (of any race)	1,865	32.3%

=== 2000 census ===
As of the 2000 census, there were 5,793 people, 2,172 households, and 1,598 families residing in the CDP. The population density was 2,699.2 inhabitants per square mile (1,042.2/km^{2}). There were 2,370 housing units at an average density of 1,104.3 per square mile (426.4/km^{2}). The racial makeup of the CDP was 85.98% White, 3.68% African American, 0.64% Native American, 1.52% Asian, 0.07% Pacific Islander, 6.16% from other races, and 1.95% from two or more races. Hispanic or Latino of any race were 17.37% of the population.

There were 2,172 households, out of which 33.0% had children under the age of 18 living with them, 56.8% were married couples living together, 12.9% had a female householder with no husband present, and 26.4% were non-families. 20.5% of all households were made up of individuals, and 7.7% had someone living alone who was 65 years of age or older. The average household size was 2.67 and the average family size was 3.07.

In the CDP, the population was spread out, with 26.8% under the age of 18, 7.5% from 18 to 24, 26.2% from 25 to 44, 25.4% from 45 to 64, and 14.0% who were 65 years of age or older. The median age was 38 years. For every 100 females, there were 94.4 males. For every 100 females age 18 and over, there were 91.0 males.

The median income for a household in the CDP was $37,021, and the median income for a family was $39,757. Males had a median income of $30,510 versus $22,826 for females. The per capita income for the CDP was $20,927. About 6.6% of families and 8.2% of the population were below the poverty line, including 9.8% of those under age 18 and 5.2% of those age 65 or over.
