= Seminole Gulf Railway =

Shortline railroad in Southwest Florida

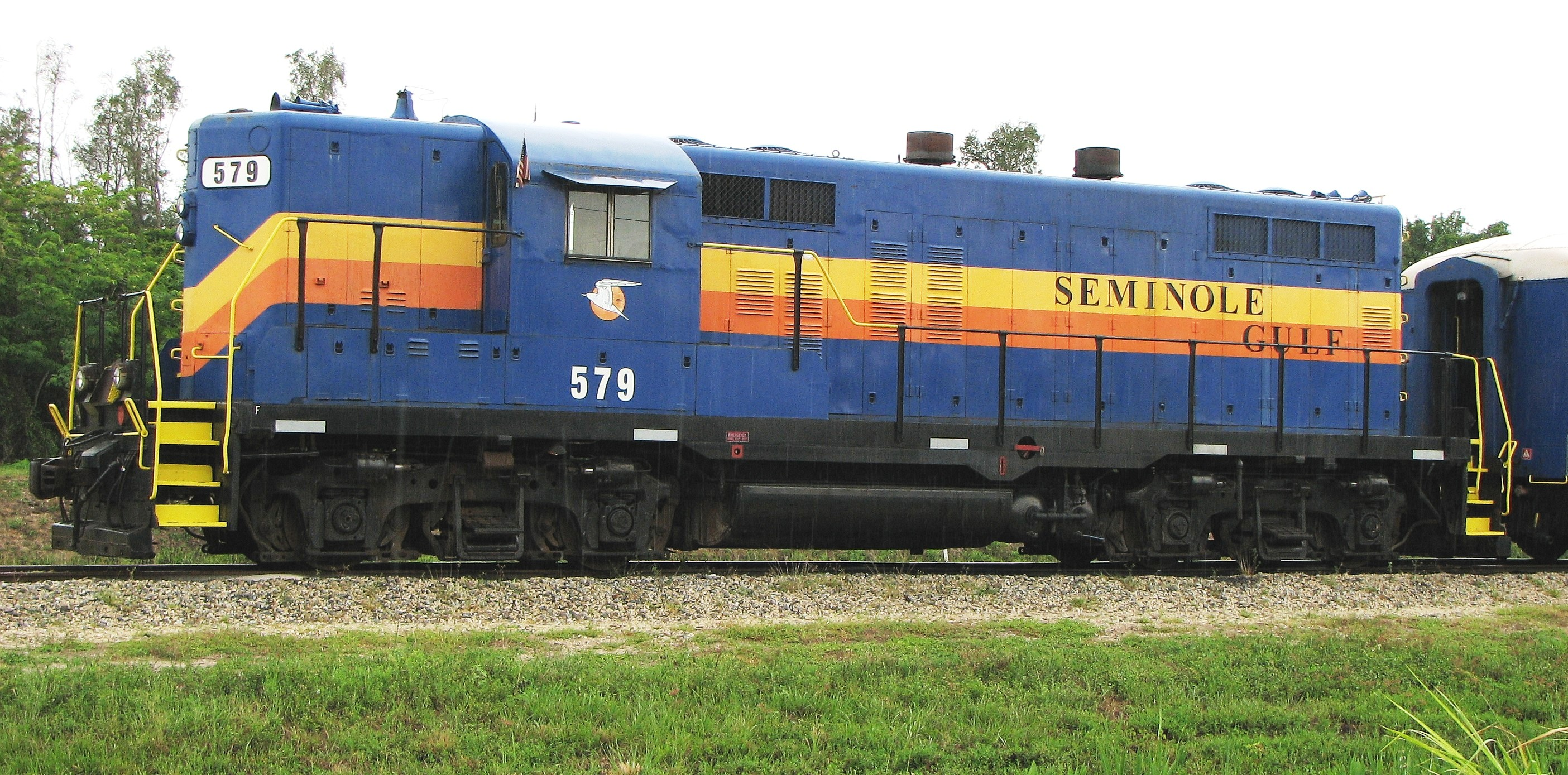
- EMD GP9 of the Seminole Gulf Railway

Overview
- Headquarters: Fort Myers, Florida
- Reporting mark: SGLR
- Locale: Southwest Florida
- Dates of operation: 1987–present
- Predecessor: Atlantic Coast Line Railroad; Seaboard Air Line Railroad; Seaboard Coast Line Railroad; CSX Transportation

Technical
- Track gauge: 4 ft 8 1/2 in (1,435 mm) standard gauge

Other
- Website: semgulf.com

The Seminole Gulf Railway (reporting mark SGLR) is a short line freight and passenger excursion railroad headquartered in Fort Myers, Florida, that operates two former CSX Transportation railroad lines in Southwest Florida. The company's Fort Myers Division, which was previously the southernmost segment of CSX's Fort Myers Subdivision, runs from Arcadia south to North Naples via Punta Gorda, Fort Myers, Estero, and Bonita Springs. The company's other line, the Sarasota Division, runs from Oneco south through Sarasota. Seminole Gulf acquired the lines in November 1987 and operates its own equipment. The company's first train departed Fort Myers on November 14, 1987.

The Seminole Gulf Railway had a commonly owned affiliated company, the Bay Colony Railroad Corp. (reporting mark BCLR), which was based in southeastern Massachusetts.

== Current operations ==
=== Freight ===
Seminole Gulf Railway is one of two freight railroads operating in Southwest Florida (the other is South Central Florida Express, which operates tracks farther inland near Clewiston). Freight transported by Seminole Gulf Railway includes lumber, propane, stone, steel, scrap metal, and other commodities. Freight is interchanged with CSX usually once or twice a week on each line. On the Fort Myers Division, freight trains between the yard in Fort Myers and Arcadia are known as the Desoto Turn. The Desoto Turn switches customers between North Fort Myers and Arcadia while industries in Fort Myers and south of there are switched locally from the yard.

=== Murder Mystery Dinner Train and Excursions ===
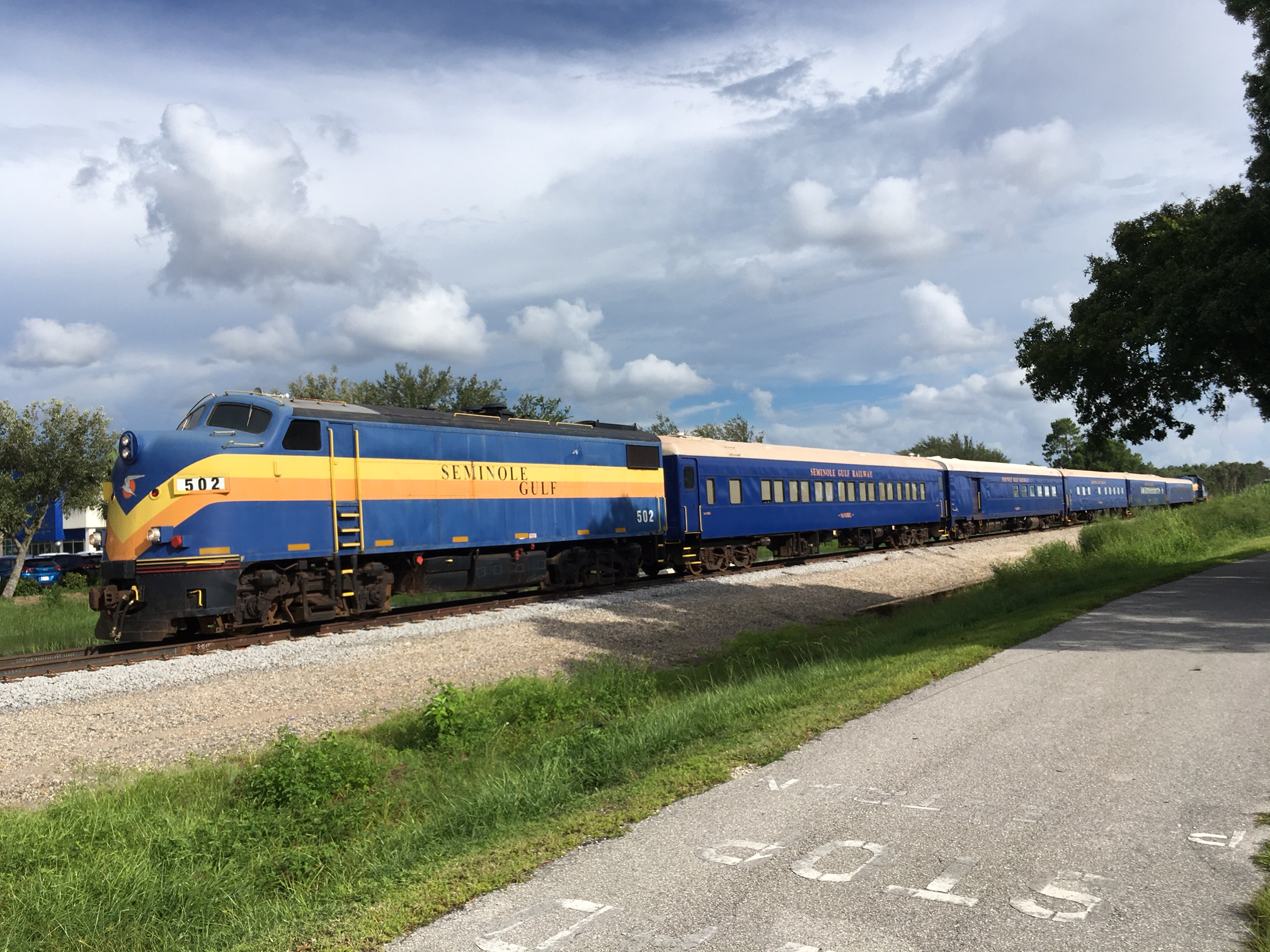
Seminole Gulf Railway Murder Mystery Dinner Train near John Yarbrough Linear Park Trail.

In addition to carrying freight, Seminole Gulf Railway also operates a popular Murder Mystery Dinner Train from Fort Myers. Under normal operation, the dinner train runs five nights a week, year-round from a station at Colonial Boulevard north to a point just south of Punta Gorda before returning. The dinner train is often headed by a vintage EMD F-unit locomotive, SGLR 502, which previously operated on the Baltimore and Ohio Railroad and the Long Island Rail Road. The train uses a fleet of 1930s-era vintage rail cars named after nearby barrier islands (some of which were previously Ringling Bros. and Barnum & Bailey Circus rail cars). The dinner train includes a five-course dinner and has featured over 80 different murder mystery productions throughout its history.

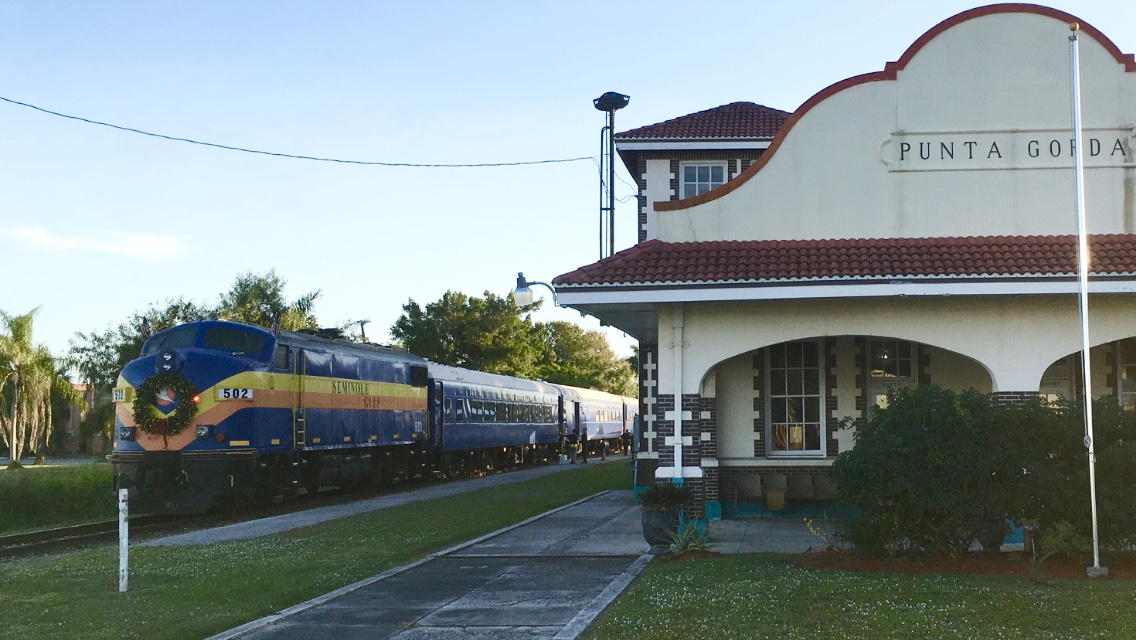
Seminole Gulf's Christmas Rail-Boat at Punta Gorda Depot in 2019

Special holiday dinner trains also operate including Sweetheart Express on Valentine's Day, Halloween Ghost Train, New Year's Eve Gala, and Christmas Rail-Boat (which runs to the historic Punta Gorda Atlantic Coast Line Depot for a Christmas boat tour through Punta Gorda Isles) to name a few.

Seminole Gulf has also operated general excursion trains in the past. Seminole Gulf first introduced passenger excursion trains and dinner trains in 1991 after losing a major freight customer. The first excursion train ran on January 5, 1991, which initially operated from a small platform in North Naples near Railhead Park. In 1993, excursion trains began operating from the current station near Colonial Boulevard in Fort Myers and ran between there and the platform at Old Depot Park in Bonita Springs, though dinner trains only operated from Fort Myers. By the late 1990s, excursion trains discontinued operation south of Fort Myers and instead ran north of Fort Myers until their discontinuation (which left the Murder Mystery Dinner Train as Seminole Gulf's only passenger service).

== Fort Myers Division ==
=== Route description ===
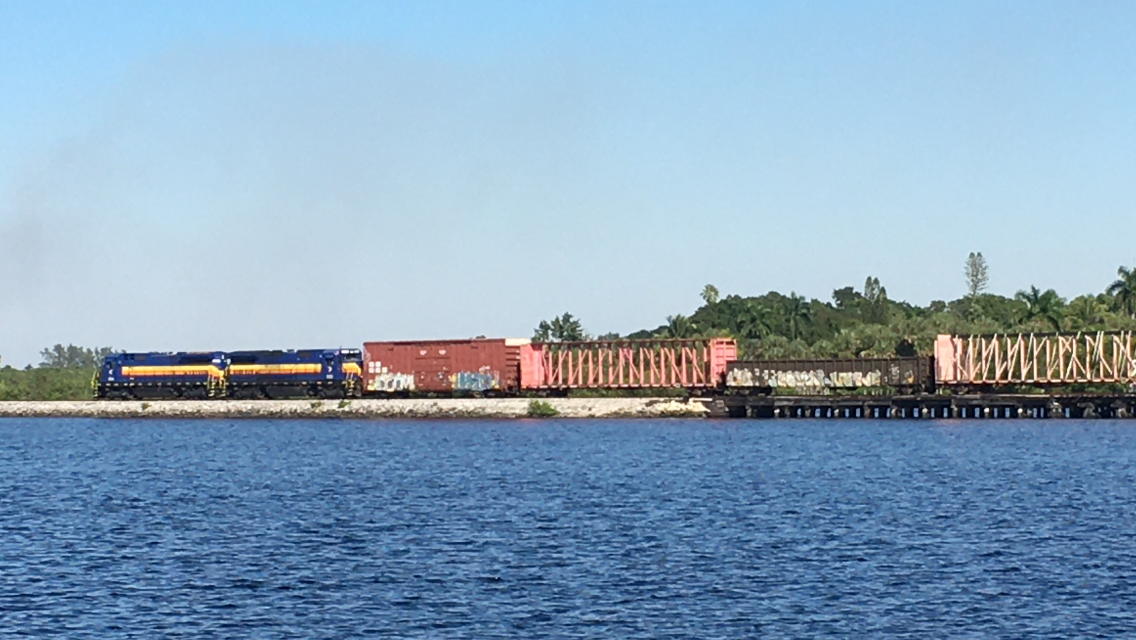
Desoto Turn crossing Caloosahatchee River in 2019

Seminole Gulf's Fort Myers Division, which extends nearly 80 miles, begins in Arcadia and runs south to Punta Gorda, Fort Myers, Bonita Springs, and North Naples.

The Fort Myers Division begins just north of Arcadia, where it continues south from CSX's Brewster Subdivision (at milepost SVC 880.75). From this point, it runs south across the Peace River, passing Morgan Park, and turns southwest into the Arcadia yard. CSX has trackage rights into Arcadia yard to facilitate the interchange between the two companies.

From the yard, the main line continues from a wye southeast a short distance before turning southwest near downtown Arcadia. From here, it roughly parallels the Peace River through Fort Ogden and Cleveland to Punta Gorda. In Punta Gorda, it turns south and then southeast closely paralleling Interstate 75 towards North Fort Myers before crossing the Caloosahatchee River between there and Tice. The crossing over the Caloosahatchee River includes a drawbridge and series of trestles that traverse Beautiful Island. From Tice on the south side of the river, the line turns southwest and runs parallel the river towards Downtown Fort Myers. Just east of downtown, the line turns south and enters Fort Myers yard limits. Seminole Gulf's main switching yard in Fort Myers is located south of Hanson Street under the Metro Parkway overpass, and a maintenance yard is just south of Colonial Boulevard next to Page Field.

From the yards, the main line continues south along the Ten Mile Canal (the John Yarbrough Linear Park parallels the line along the canal). The line has a short spur just north San Carlos Park known as the Baker Spur, which extends west a little over a mile along Alico Road.

From the Baker Spur, the main line then heads south through Estero and Downtown Bonita Springs before terminating at a Cemex facility at the end of Wiggins Pass Road in North Naples, just a mile south of the Lee/Collier County line. The main line south of Alico Road has not had any active shippers and has been inactive since around 2008. As of early 2024, Seminole Gulf is planning to sell this segment of the line to be converted to the Bonita Estero Rail Trail.

=== History ===
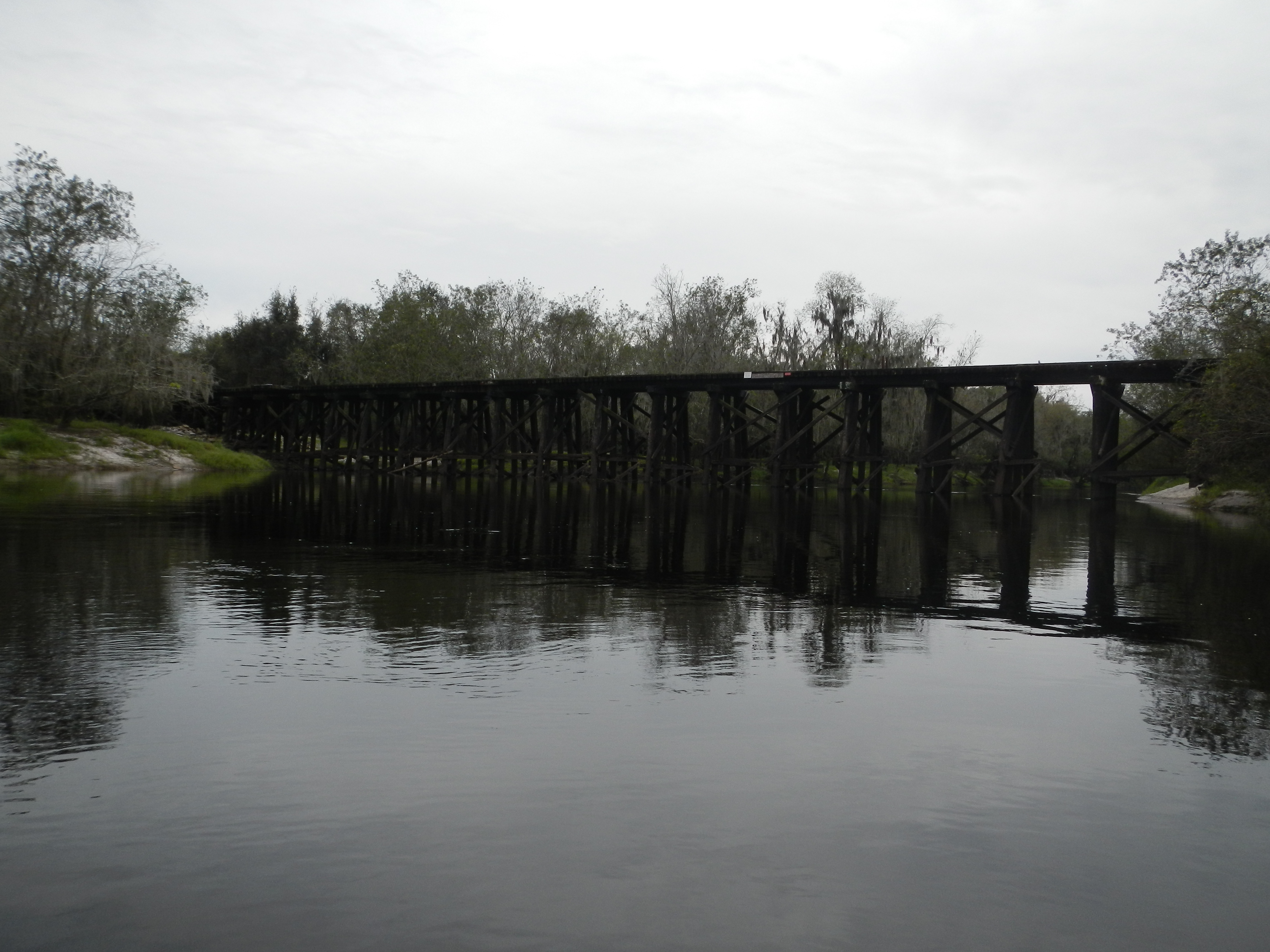
Bridge over Peace River near Arcadia

What is now Seminole Gulf Railway's main line came into existence incrementally in the late 1800s and early 20th century.

The northernmost section of the Seminole Gulf track along with the Arcadia yard and the CSX line to the north was originally built by the Charlotte Harbor and Northern Railway. Built from 1907 to 1910, the Charlotte Harbor and Northern Railway (which would later be acquired by the Seaboard Air Line Railroad in 1926) historically extended from Arcadia south to Boca Grande. The line from the Arcadia yard southeast along Pine Street was the Charlotte Harbor and Northern's connecting track to the Florida Southern Railway.

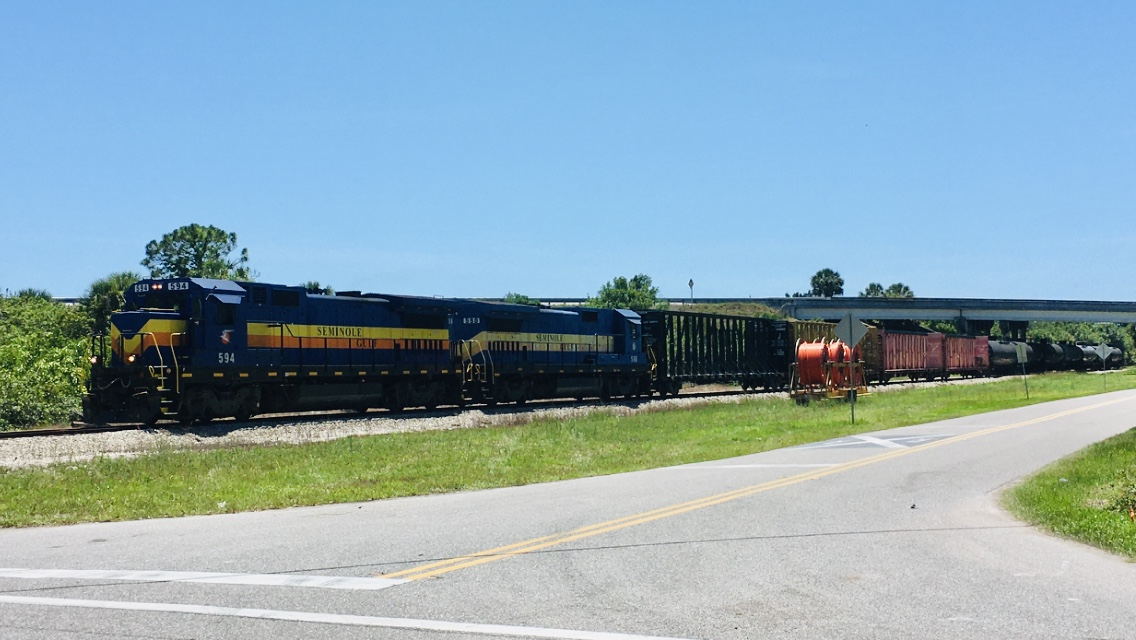
Desoto Turn near Punta Gorda

From this point, Seminole Gulf continues south along the former Florida Southern Railway (a subsidiary of Henry Plant's system of railroads) south to Punta Gorda. This segment was built in 1886 making it the oldest segment of the Seminole Gulf line and was the southernmost segment of the Florida Southern's Charlotte Harbor Division, which originated in Bartow. The original Florida Southern route north of Arcadia (which ran past the historic Arcadia passenger depot) was removed in 1984. Surveying work to determine the route for the Florida Southern Railway to Punta Gorda was done by Punta Gorda civil engineer Albert W. Gilchrist, who would later serve as Florida's 20th governor. The line's first train to Punta Gorda arrived on July 24, 1886. The line, originally built as narrow gauge, was widened to standard gauge in 1892, and the Florida Southern was fully integrated with the Plant System in 1896.

In Punta Gorda, the line initially continued west through the city and terminated at a dock facility in the Peace River near Charlotte Harbor. This dock, known as the Long Dock, was located near the Punta Gorda Isles Yacht Club (a mile west of where Fishermen's Village stands today). A passenger depot was also located near King Street (the historic depot on Taylor Street was built later in 1928). Punta Gorda became the southernmost point the Plant System ever reached, and the railroad's arrival is largely responsible for Punta Gorda's development as a city, which was incorporated four years later. Today, the spur near Elizabeth Street in Punta Gorda is all that remains of the original alignment to the Punta Gorda docks (the Punta Gorda Linear Park today runs along the rest of that route west of US 41).

Charlotte Harbor was Henry Plant's ultimate goal and he had no interest in having the line continue south to Fort Myers. This is despite the fact that Plant opened a hotel in Fort Myers in 1896. Fort Myers was seeking railroad service at the time and had already been established as a city unlike Punta Gorda. After Plant's death in 1899, his heirs would sell his entire system of railroads to the Atlantic Coast Line Railroad (ACL) in 1902, and serving Fort Myers quickly became a top priority for ACL president Henry Walters. Construction commenced promptly on the extension to Fort Myers via Tice, which made it the ACL's first expansion of the former Plant System. The alignment through Tice was selected so the line would cross the wide Caloosahatchee River farther upstream at Beautiful Island, where a series of shorter trestles could be built. The northernmost trestle originally had a steel swing span built by the American Bridge Company to accommodate river traffic. Service up to the Caloosahatchee River commenced in 1903. The first train reached Fort Myers on May 10, 1904 after the completion of the trestles over the river.

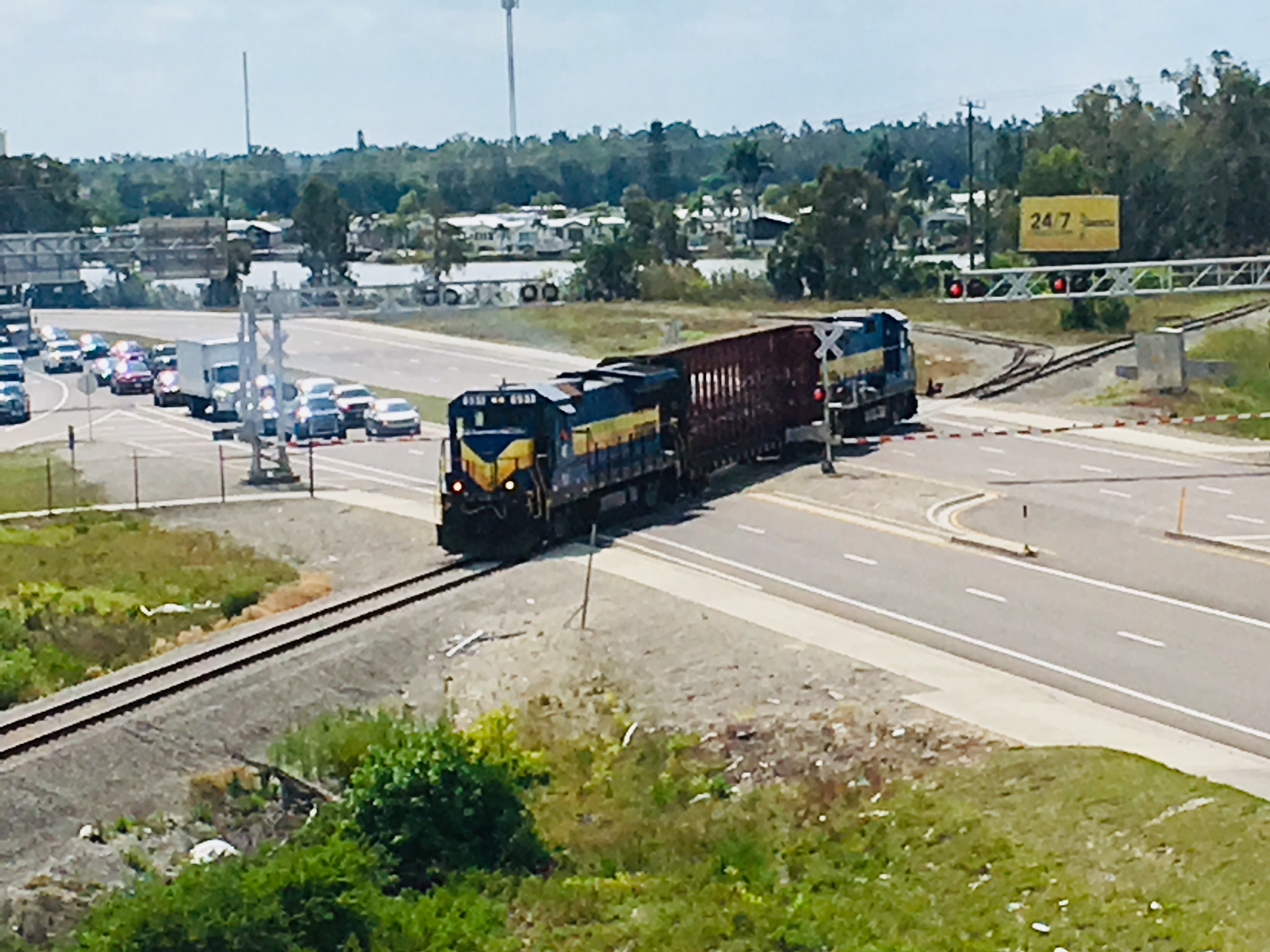
Local freight train crossing Alico Road near the Baker Spur junction south of Fort Myers

In Fort Myers, the ACL built a depot downtown at Main and Monroe Streets and a wharf along the Caloosahatchee River at the end of Monroe Street. The original depot would be replaced with the depot that still stands today on Peck Street (now Widman Way) in 1924, and the wharf would only exist until 1944. The spur that runs from the line just south of State Road 82 is all that remains of the wye and tracks that once served the downtown Fort Myers depot and docks. Fort Myers also experienced major growth after the arrival of the railroad and would remain the southernmost point of the entire Atlantic Coast Line Railroad system until the Florida land boom of the 1920s.

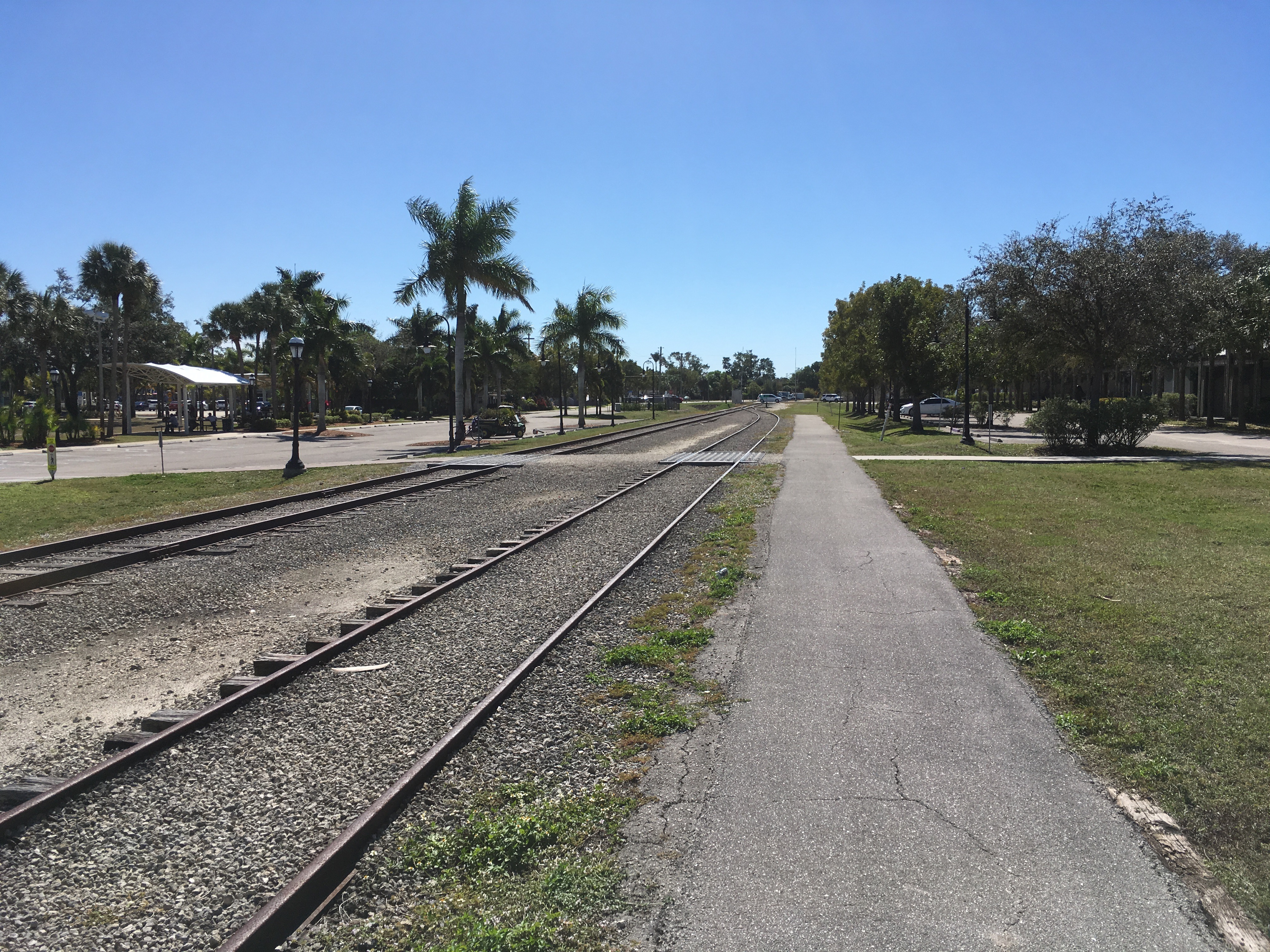
Seminole Gulf track though Downtown Bonita Springs. The platform is all that remains of the Atlantic Coast Line's passenger depot

Once the land boom was underway, the ACL partnered with a number of local businessmen including advertising entrepreneur Barron Collier, who owned large amounts of land in the newly created Collier County. Through this partnership, they acquired the dormant charter of the unbuilt Fort Myers Southern Railroad and used it to extend the line from Fort Myers further south into Collier County. The line reached Bonita Springs by late 1925 where a depot was built just south of the Imperial River (the depot has since been demolished but the depot's platform and siding still remain near Riverside Park). The line was further extended to Naples by December 1926, and to Collier City on Marco Island in mid 1927. At the same time, the Seaboard Air Line Railroad (SAL) was building a competing line from Fort Ogden to Fort Myers and Naples. SAL's service to Naples commenced eleven days after the ACL, though SAL discontinued service to Naples by 1942. By 1944, the Atlantic Coast Line abandoned the line to Marco Island, and extended the remaining track from near Vanderbilt Beach down the ex-SAL right of way to the SAL's former passenger depot on Fifth Avenue South.

The Atlantic Coast Line relocated its freight yard from downtown Fort Myers to its current location south of Hanson Street in 1960.

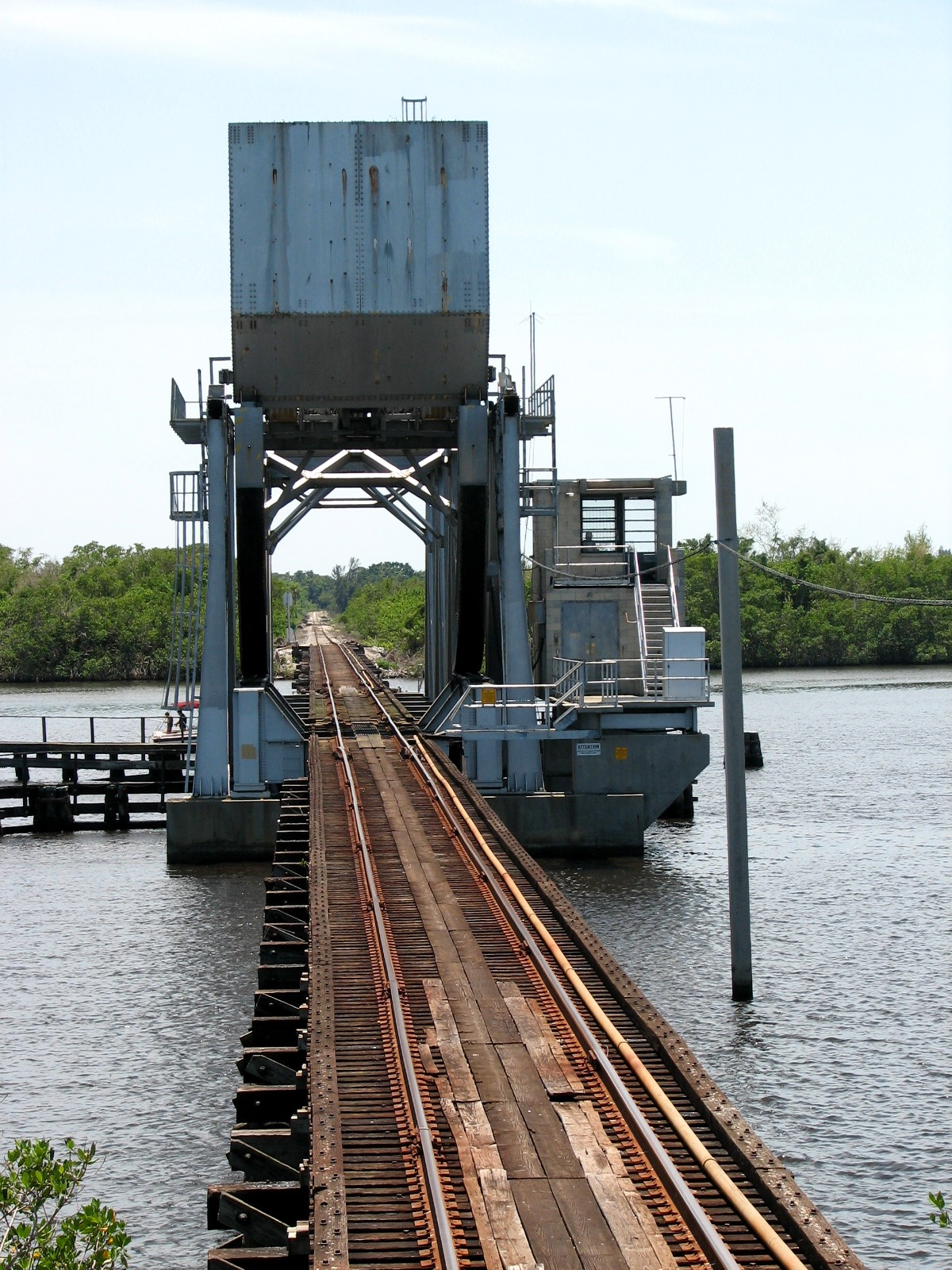
Seminole Gulf's drawbridge over the Caloosahatchee River just east of Fort Myers at milepost AX 960.

The Atlantic Coast Line became the Seaboard Coast Line Railroad (SCL) in 1967 after merging with the Seaboard Air Line, its former rival. The Baker Spur just north of San Carlos Park was then built in 1973. The Baker Spur would extend beyond the route of Interstate 75 to serve rock mines in eastern Lee County on land owned by the Atlantic Land and Improvement Company (known today as Alico, Inc.), which at one point had been a subsidiary of the Atlantic Coast Line Railroad and was the holding company for its real estate division. Seminole Gulf abandoned the easternmost three miles of the Baker Spur in 1994.

Intercity passenger service to Southwest Florida was discontinued in 1971 upon the creation of Amtrak, who opted not to serve Southwest Florida. In 1975, Seaboard Coast Line sold the Fort Myers passenger depot to the city of Fort Myers. In 1977, the swing bridge over the Caloosahatchee River was replaced by the current bascule bridge.

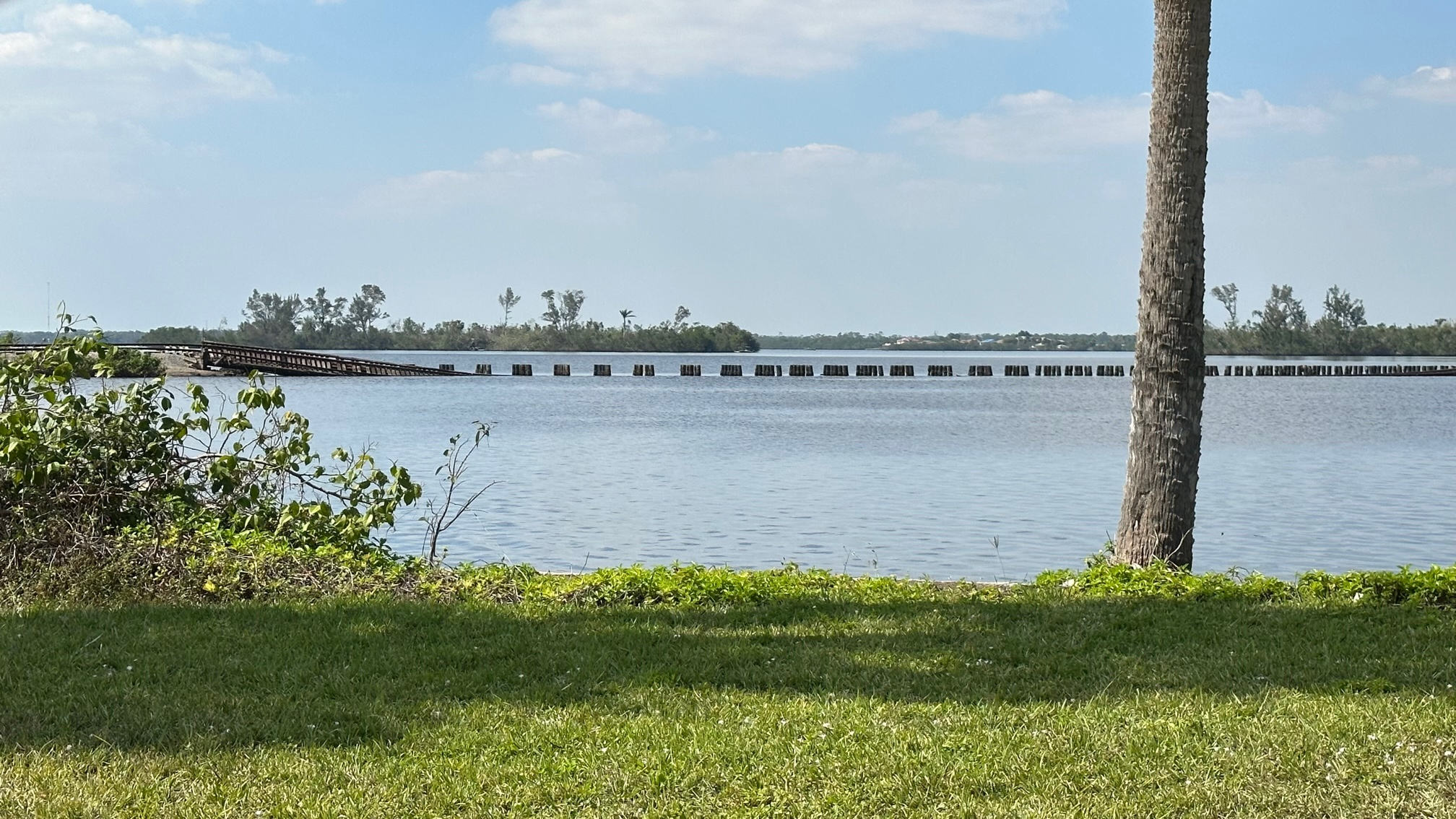
Seminole Gulf Railway's Caloosahatchee River trestle after suffering damage from Hurricane Ian

In early 1980, tracks into downtown Naples were removed and the line was cut back to its current terminus in North Naples. The area around the line's new terminus in North Naples was subsequently developed into the Rail Head Industrial Park. Seminole Gulf began operating the line seven years later.

In the mid-2000s, a short stretch of the line between Edison Avenue and State Road 82 in Fort Myers was realigned and upgraded with continuous welded rail. The northern leg of the wye to Downtown Fort Myers was also severed at this time. This was done to accommodate the expansion of Evans Avenue.

On September 28, 2022, the Fort Myers Division received significant damage from the landfall of Hurricane Ian. At the north end of the line, Arcadia Yard was flooded and the three trestles across the Peace River in Arcadia were partially destroyed, severing the line from the CSX interchange. Three of the four trestles across the Caloosahatchee River near Tice were also destroyed. Due to the damage, Seminole Gulf had to divert freight to the Sarasota Division and transload it to trucks to serve customers on the Fort Myers Division. The Peace River trestles were repaired by February 2023 restoring service as far as North Fort Myers. Reconstruction of the Caloosahatchee River trestles was complete in February 2024.

In late 2025, Seminole Gulf began making upgrades to track from Fort Ogden to Cleveland (just east of Punta Gorda).

== Sarasota Division ==
=== Route description ===
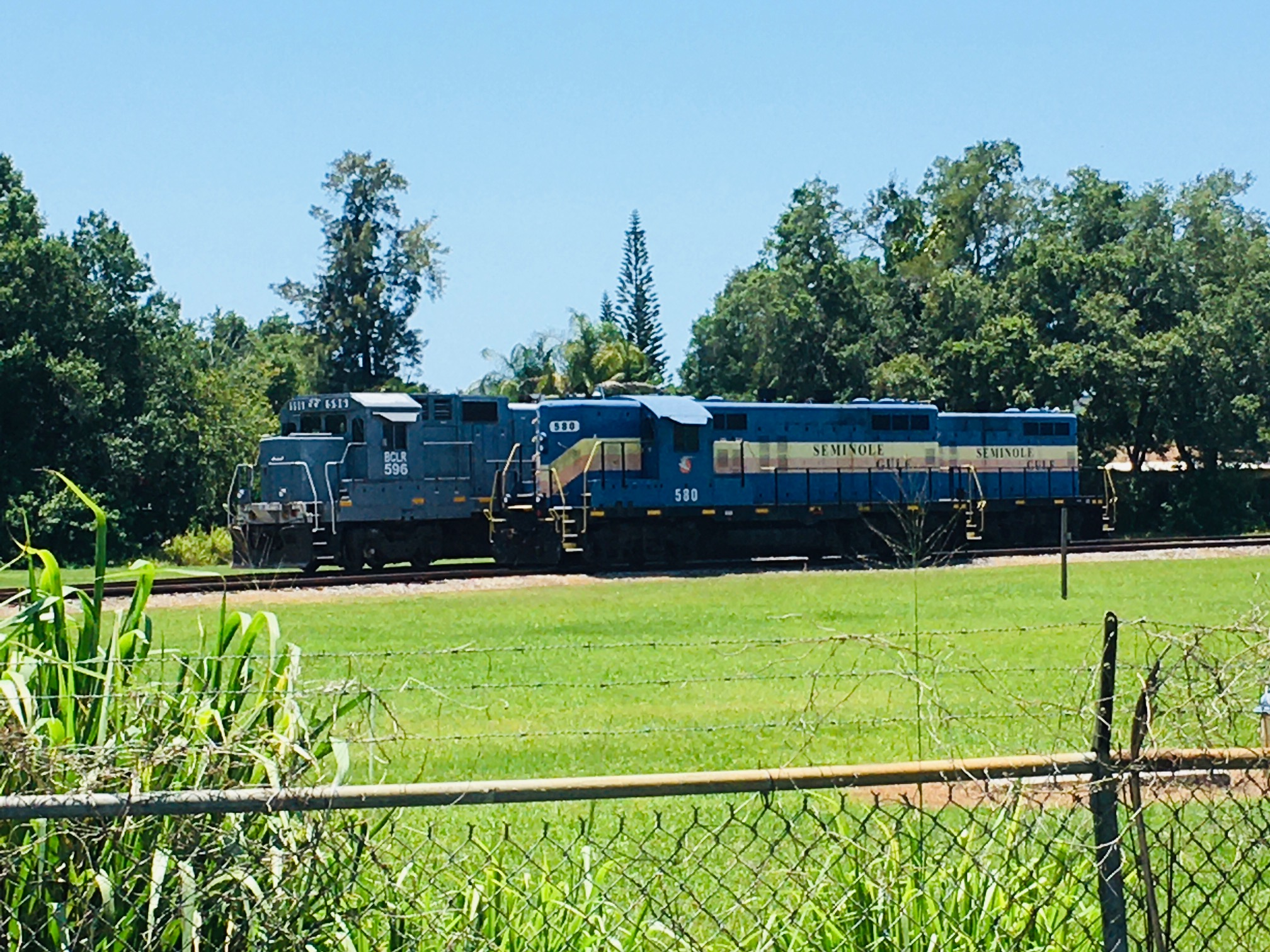
Seminole Gulf's locomotives for the Sarasota Division parked at Suburban Propane

In Sarasota, Seminole Gulf largely operates on a u-shaped line. The northwest end of the line is located just south of Bradenton in Oneco, where it continues south from CSX's Palmetto Subdivision. The interchange point is located a little over a mile south of CSX's Tropicana Yard, where a side track facilitates the interchange between the two companies. From Oneco, the line heads due south along former Seaboard Air Line Railroad tracks towards Sarasota, passing through Tallevast and close to Sarasota-Bradenton International Airport. The line's locomotives are stored on a small spur at Myrtle Street west of US 301. Just north of Downtown Sarasota, the line turns east onto former Atlantic Coast Line Railroad tracks and comes to a wye just east of US 301. From the wye, the line turns back north along the former Atlantic Coast Line main line and terminates just south of Whitfield Avenue in Motoaka.

The line went as far south as Venice when Seminole Gulf first began operating it. Track to Venice previously ran from the wye at the southeast corner of the current line and went south-southeast through Fruitville, Bee Ridge, Palmer Ranch and Nokomis. Track was abandoned south of Palmer Ranch in 2004 and the remaining line up to Fruitville Road was abandoned in 2019. The Legacy Trail runs on the former right of way from Fruitville Road to Venice.

=== History ===
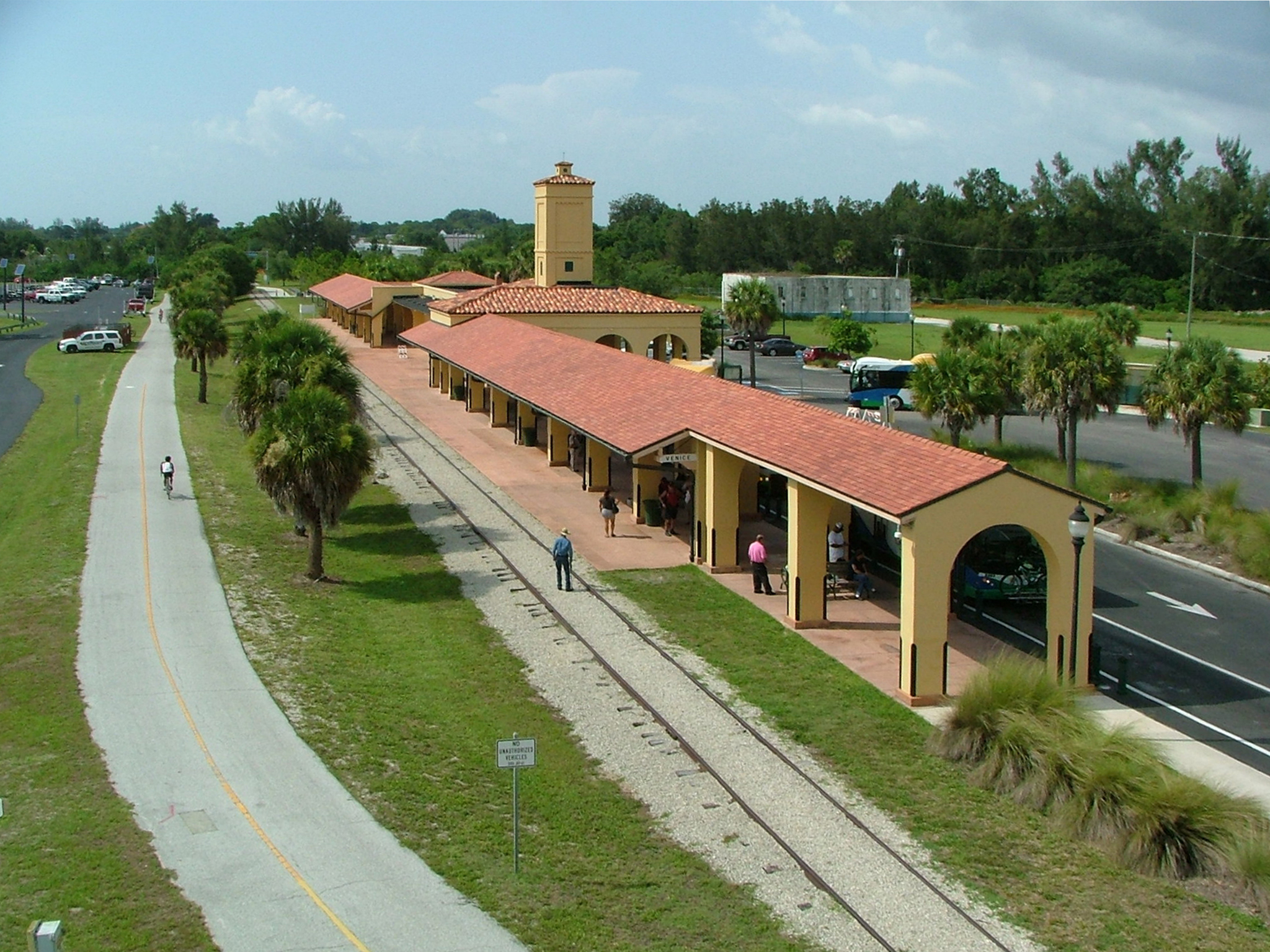
Venice Seaboard Air Line Railroad depot at the former southern terminus

The first trackage of the Sarasota Division to be built (the west track) was built by the Seaboard Air Line Railroad (SAL) through their Florida West Shore Railway subsidiary in 1903. It was part of a line that extended from Durant (just east of Tampa), to Sarasota via Parrish, Palmetto and Bradenton. Some of the line was built on the former road bed of the Arcadia, Gulf Coast and Lakeland Railroad, an earlier unsuccessful railroad between Bradenton and Sarasota. In Sarasota, the tracks originally continued south into downtown along Lemon Avenue and served a dock facility in Sarasota Bay. In 1905, Seaboard extended the line east into Fruitville, which initially ran southeast along Pineapple Avenue and then east along what is now Alderman Street and Brother Geenen Way. In 1911, at the request of local socialite Bertha Honoré Palmer, the line was extended south to Venice.

The Atlantic Coast Line (ACL) came to the area later in 1924 as part of the Florida land boom when they built the Tampa Southern Railroad (the east track). The ACL's passenger depot existed at Main Street and School Avenue and a spur was built to Payne Terminal at Hog Creek (this spur and its wye today form the connection track between the east and west track). From Sarasota, the ACL track turned east and ran directly beside the SAL track through Fruitville. From 1924 to 1949, the ACL track continued from Fruitville southeast as far as Fort Ogden (along the Peace River), where it merged with the Coast Line's route to Fort Myers (which is, coincidentally, Seminole Gulf's Fort Myers Division). Spurs connected both lines to the Ringling Bros. and Barnum & Bailey Circus's Sarasota headquarters near Fruitville (which existed from 1927 to 1959, when the headquarters were relocated to the end of the line in Venice).

In 1967, the Seaboard Air Line and the Atlantic Coast Line merged to form the Seaboard Coast Line Railroad (who later merged with the Chessie System in the 1980s to form CSX). The mergers brought all of the track under a single owner and led to consolidation of the two routes and abandonment of redundant trackage. This included the SAL's original route through downtown Sarasota (which was removed in 1968), the ACL's tracks between Bradenton and Matoaka, and the consolidation of the east–west parallel track through Fruitville to a single track (using the former SAL track).

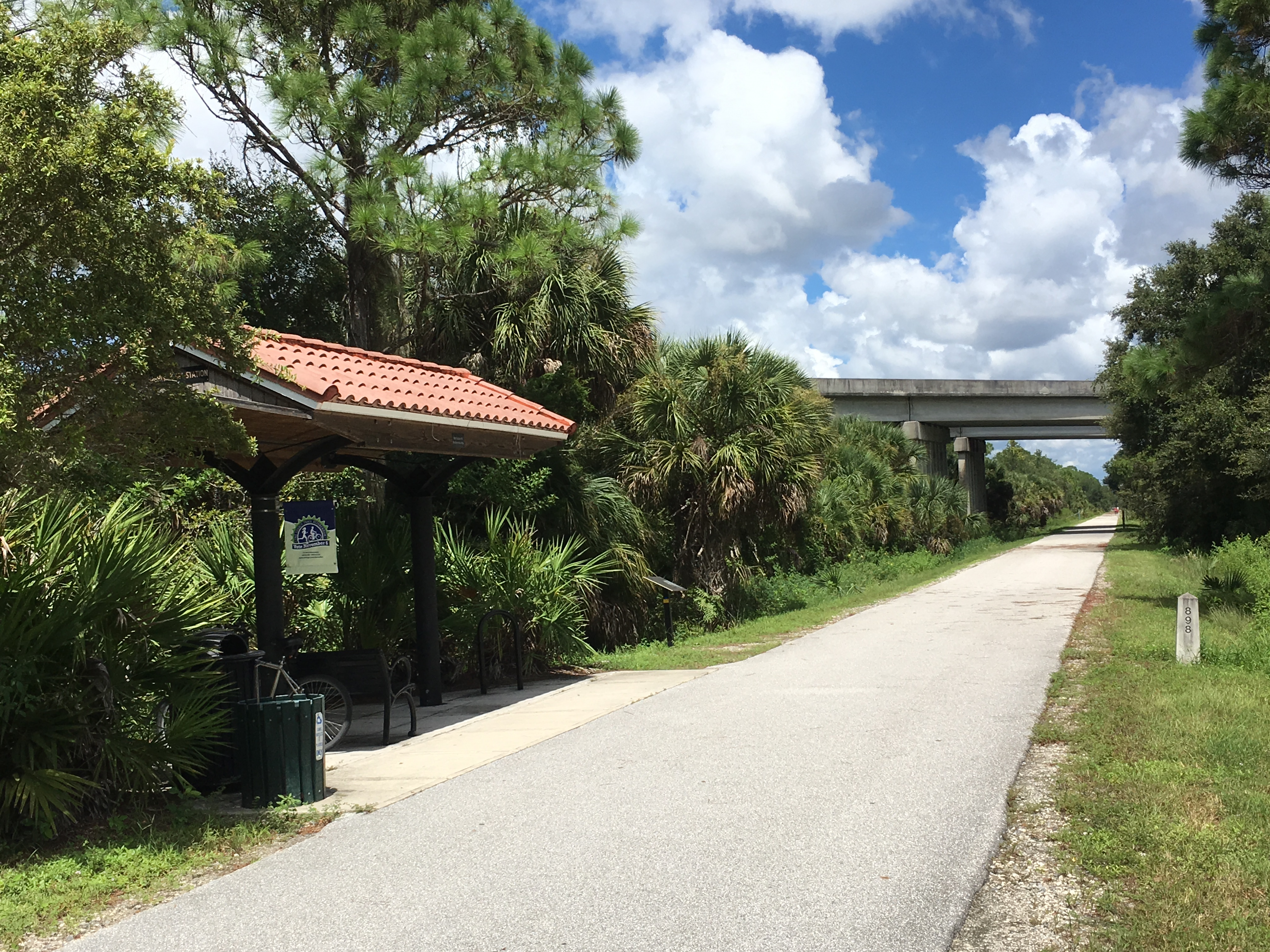
Legacy Trail on former right of way at milepost 898 near Laurel. The trail's mile markers match the railroad's mileposts.

After taking over the line in 1987, Seminole Gulf continued to carry the Ringling Bros. and Barnum & Bailey Circus to their Venice headquarters up until 1990, when the circus relocated their headquarters to Tampa. The circus relocated to Tampa mainly due to the fact that the Venice segment of the rail line could no longer support their rail equipment due to the rough condition of the track. As previously mentioned, the line was abandoned from Venice to Palmer Ranch in 2004 due to decreased demand and the heavily deteriorated condition of the tracks and bridges. The track from Palmer Ranch to central Sarasota was abandoned in 2019.

In 2020, Seminole Gulf improved a stretch of track around Myrtle Street west of US 301. The improvements included adding siding and rebuilding a small spur to serve as a small storage yard.

== Locomotive roster ==
Model	Road number
EMD F-unit	501
EMD F-unit	502
EMD GP9	571
EMD GP9	573
EMD GP9	575
EMD GP9	576
EMD GP9	577
EMD GP9	578
EMD GP9	579
EMD GP9	580
GE B39-8E	590
GE B39-8E	591–592
GE B39-8E	593–596
GE B40-8	597–598
