= John Yarbrough Linear Park =

Linear park trail in Fort Myers, Florida, U.S.

Coordinates: 26.56897°N 81.85539°W

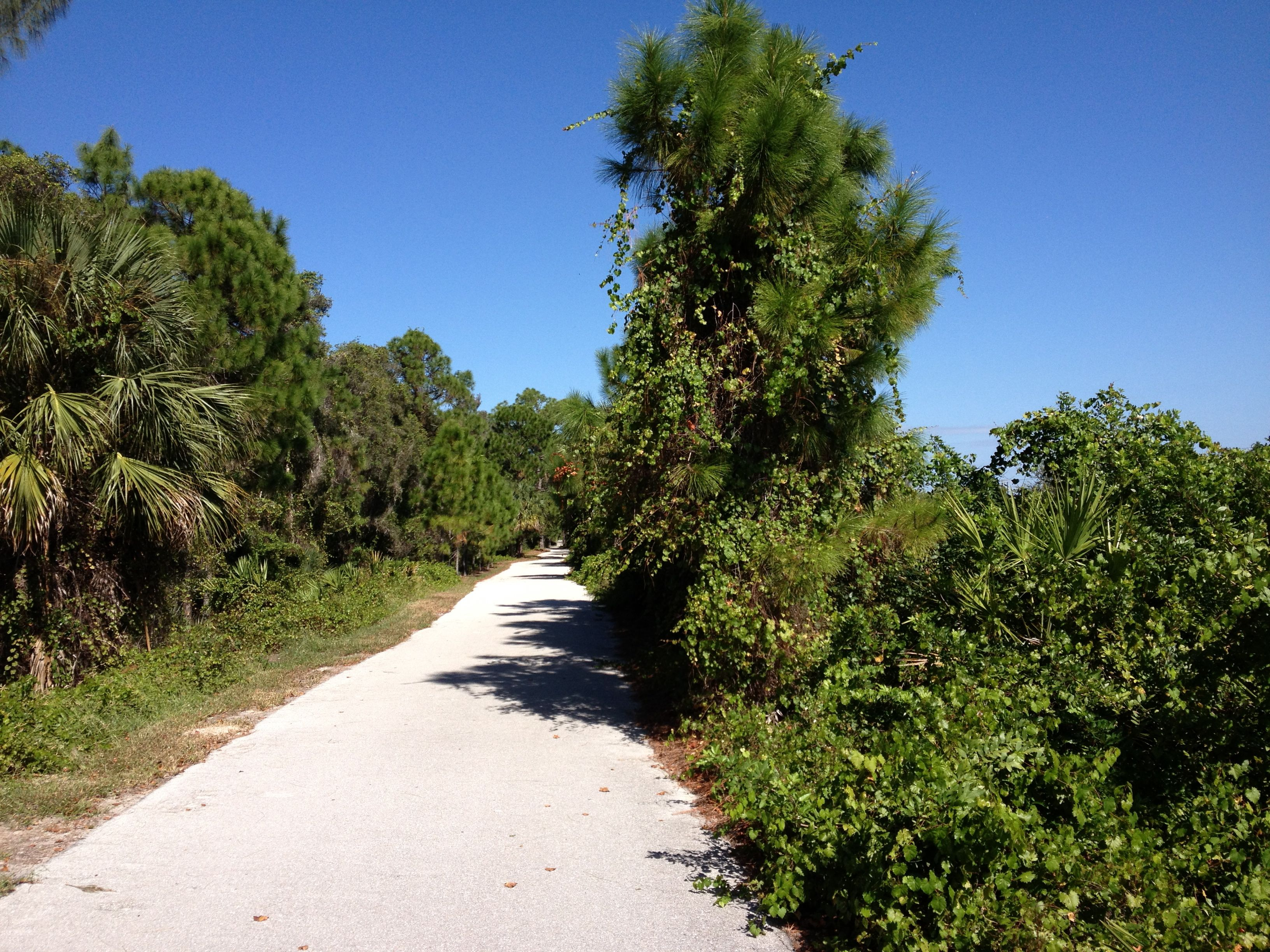
- Length: 6 mi (9.7 km)
- Location: Fort Myers, Florida, United States
- Trailheads: Six Mile Cypress Parkway; Colonial Boulevard
- Use: Cycling, Walking, Hiking, Jogging
- Season: Year round
- Surface: Asphalt
- Website: John Yarbrough Linear Park

The John Yarbrough Linear Park (originally the Ten Mile Canal Linear Park) is a 6-mile linear park trail located in Fort Myers, Florida. The trail parallels the Ten Mile Canal and the Seminole Gulf Railway, and is owned and operated by Lee County Parks and Recreation. It is part of Lee County's Tour de Parks route along with Lakes Regional Park and other locations.

== Route description ==
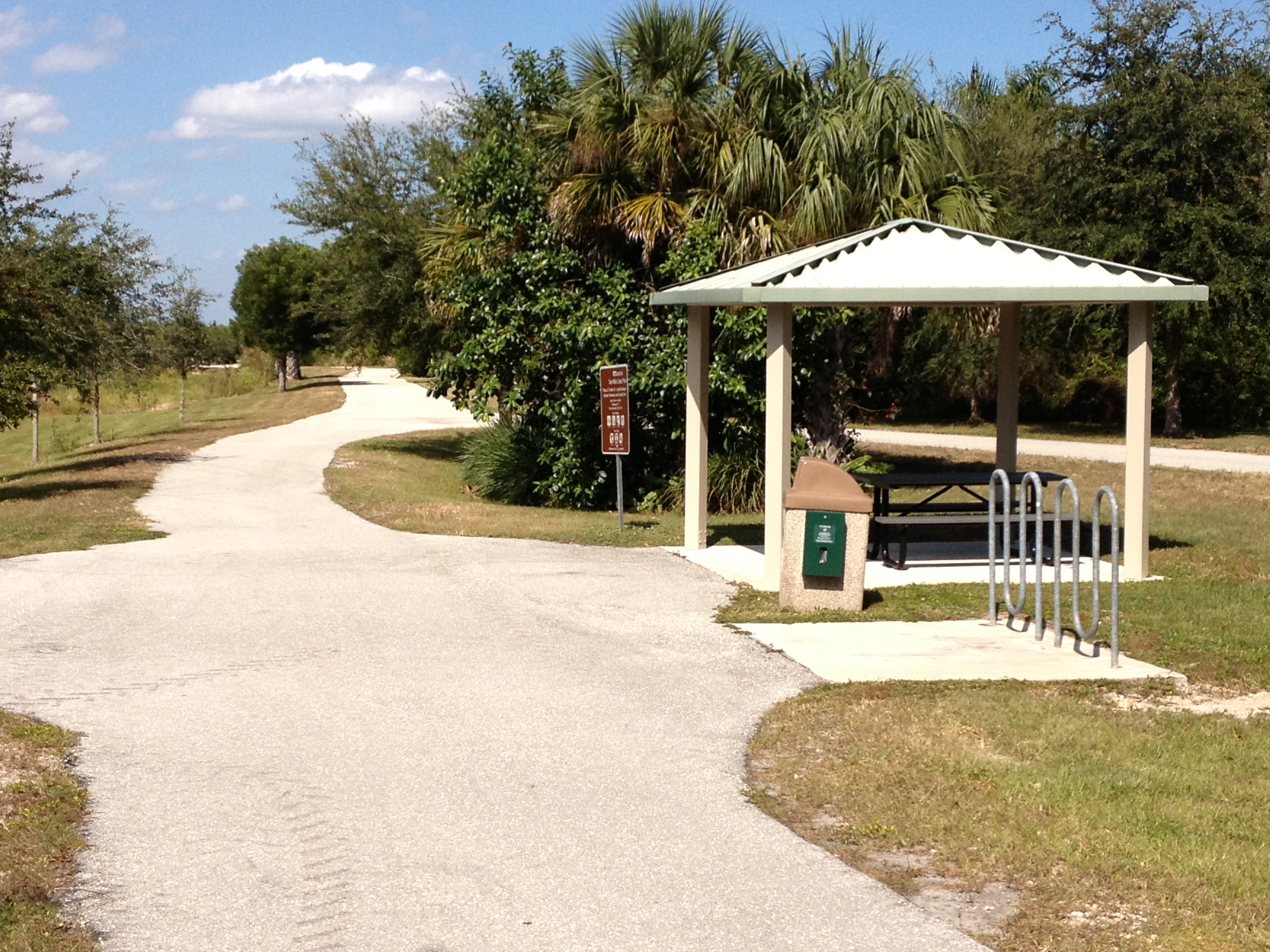
Central segment of the trail with a shelter and picnic table

The John Yarbrough Linear Park's southern terminus is at a trailhead on Six Mile Cypress Parkway. At this trailhead, it connects to a shared-use path that runs along Michael G. Rippe Parkway to Alico Road, which will connect to the proposed Bonita Estero Rail Trail.

From the trailhead on Six Mile Cypress, the John Yarbrough Linear Park heads north along the west side of the Ten Mile Canal. It crosses the canal about half a mile to the north and runs between the canal and the Seminole Gulf Railway. At Daniels Parkway, trail users are directed west to the next signalized intersection to cross the six-lane road.

The trail resumes on the north side of Daniels Parkway, continuing between the canal and the railroad. At Crystal Drive, it crosses back to the west side of the canal for less than a mile before crossing back to the east side. The trail passes Page Field and one of Seminole Gulf Railway's yards as it enters Fort Myers city limits. It comes to its northern terminus at Colonial Boulevard a short distance later.

== History ==
The historic corridor where the John Yarbrough Linear Park runs has existed since the 1920s, when the Ten Mile Canal was dug by the Iona drainage district to control flooding in the area and divert water to Estero Bay. The Ten Mile Canal corridor would also include two railroad lines. The Atlantic Coast Line Railroad (ACL) built tracks on the east side of the canal in 1925 as an extension of their Lakeland—Fort Myers Line (the present-day Seminole Gulf Railway). From 1926 to 1952, a second railroad line existed on the west side of the canal which belonged to the ACL's competitor, the Seaboard Air Line Railroad. Segments of the trail on the west side of the canal run close to former Seaboard Air Line right of way.

The first phase of the linear park trail opened in November 2005 between Six Mile Cypress Parkway and Daniels Parkway. The first phase is 1.25 miles and includes two shelters with picnic tables. The second phase opened in October 2006, extending the trail north a mile and a half to Crystal Drive. The third phase, completed in April 2008, extended it to Colonial Boulevard.

When the trail first opened in 2005, it was known as the Ten Mile Canal Linear Park. On September 9, 2008, the park was renamed in honor of retiring director John Yarbrough of Lee County Parks and Recreation.

A trailhead with a paved parking lot and restrooms opened at the south end of the trail (at Six Mile Cypress Parkway) opened in early 2022.

== Features ==
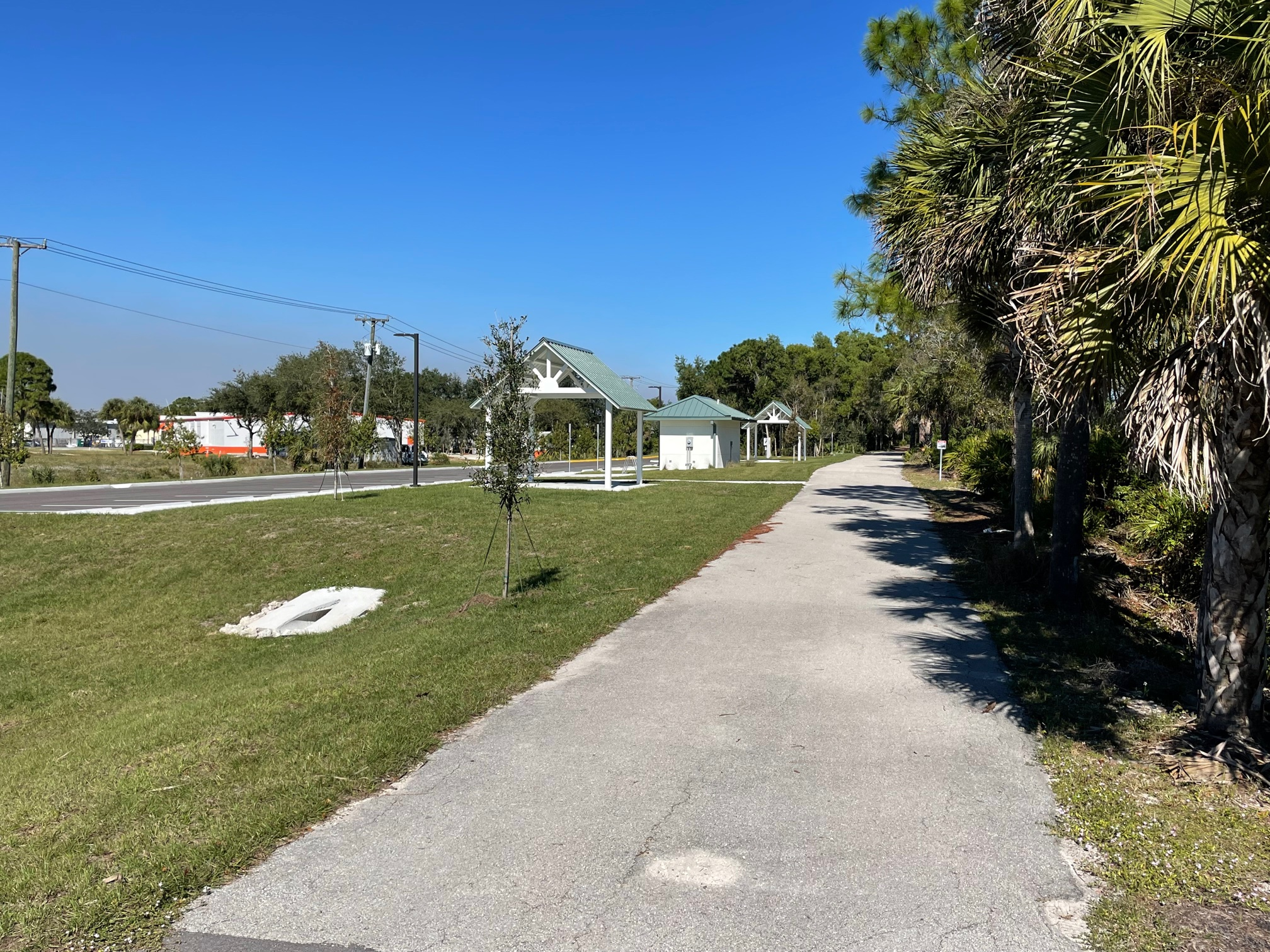
Trailhead at the south end of the trail

The linear park is dog-friendly, and includes picnic tables, benches, and covered shelters for shade. Minor roadway crossings include motion-activated flashing signals to warn motorists. Due to its proximity to the canal, wildlife including birds, turtles and even alligators can often be seen from the trail.

Parking for the trail is available at the trailhead at Six Mile Cypress Parkway. There are also unpaved parking lots for the trail on both sides of Daniels Parkway.

=== Filter Marsh ===
The park also includes a filter marsh south of Daniels Parkway. The filter marsh was built along with the first phase of the trail, and is designed to divert and purify water from the Ten Mile Canal. Purification is achieved as water moves slowly through the marsh, and plants such as white water lilies and bulrush aid the process before the water returns to the canal at the other end. The marshes and the included plants run right next to the trail and are visible throughout.

=== Points of interest ===
- Page Field
- Seminole Gulf Railway Yard
- Ten Mile Canal
- Sun Harvest Citrus Factory

== Future ==
The city of Fort Myers is planning to extend the John Yarbrough Linear Park north beyond Colonial Boulevard. The extension will continue the trail north 1.8 miles to Hanson Street with an overpass over Colonial Boulevard. Construction on the extension is set to begin by 2026. The City of Fort Myers is also planning to conduct a feasibility study to connect the trail's northern extension with the North Colonial Linear Park, a similar trail to the east along the North Colonial Canal.

The John Yarbrough Linear Park is planned to be part of the Florida Gulf Coast Trail, a collection of trails connecting Tampa and Naples.

== Gallery ==
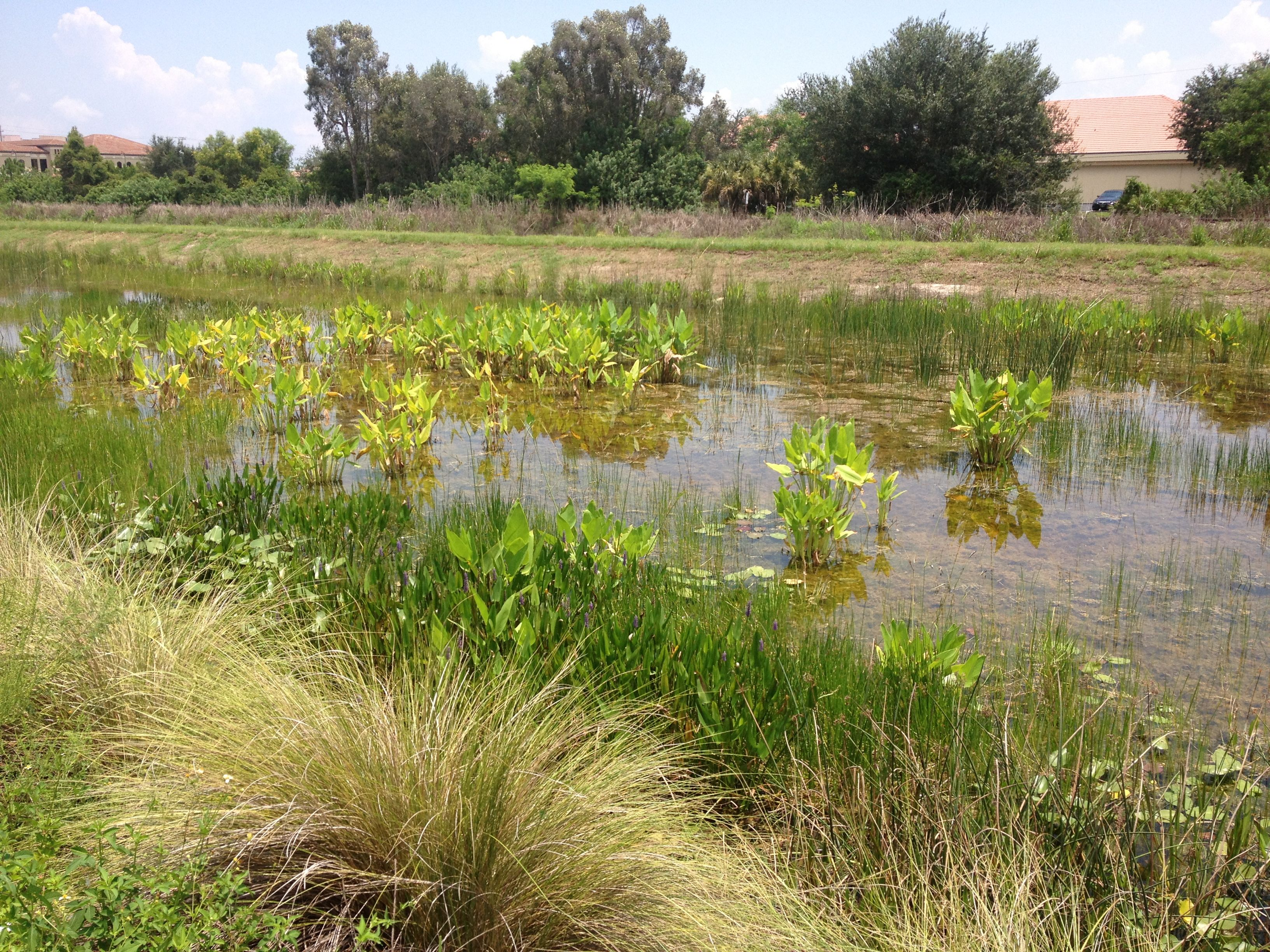
Ten Mile Canal's Filter Marsh, which includes a number of attractive plants to filter the canal's water

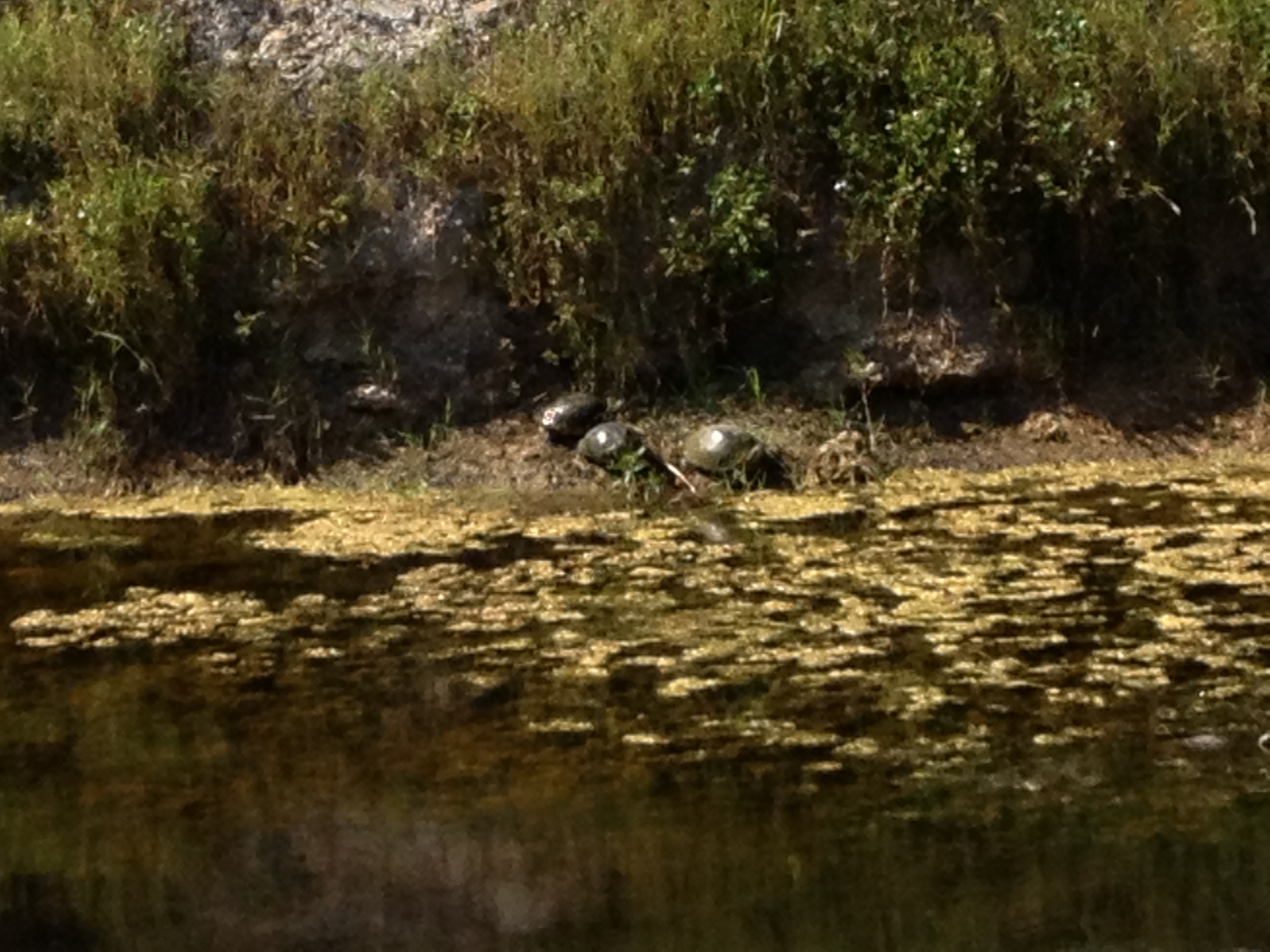
Turtles can often be seen sunbathing in the canal along the trail

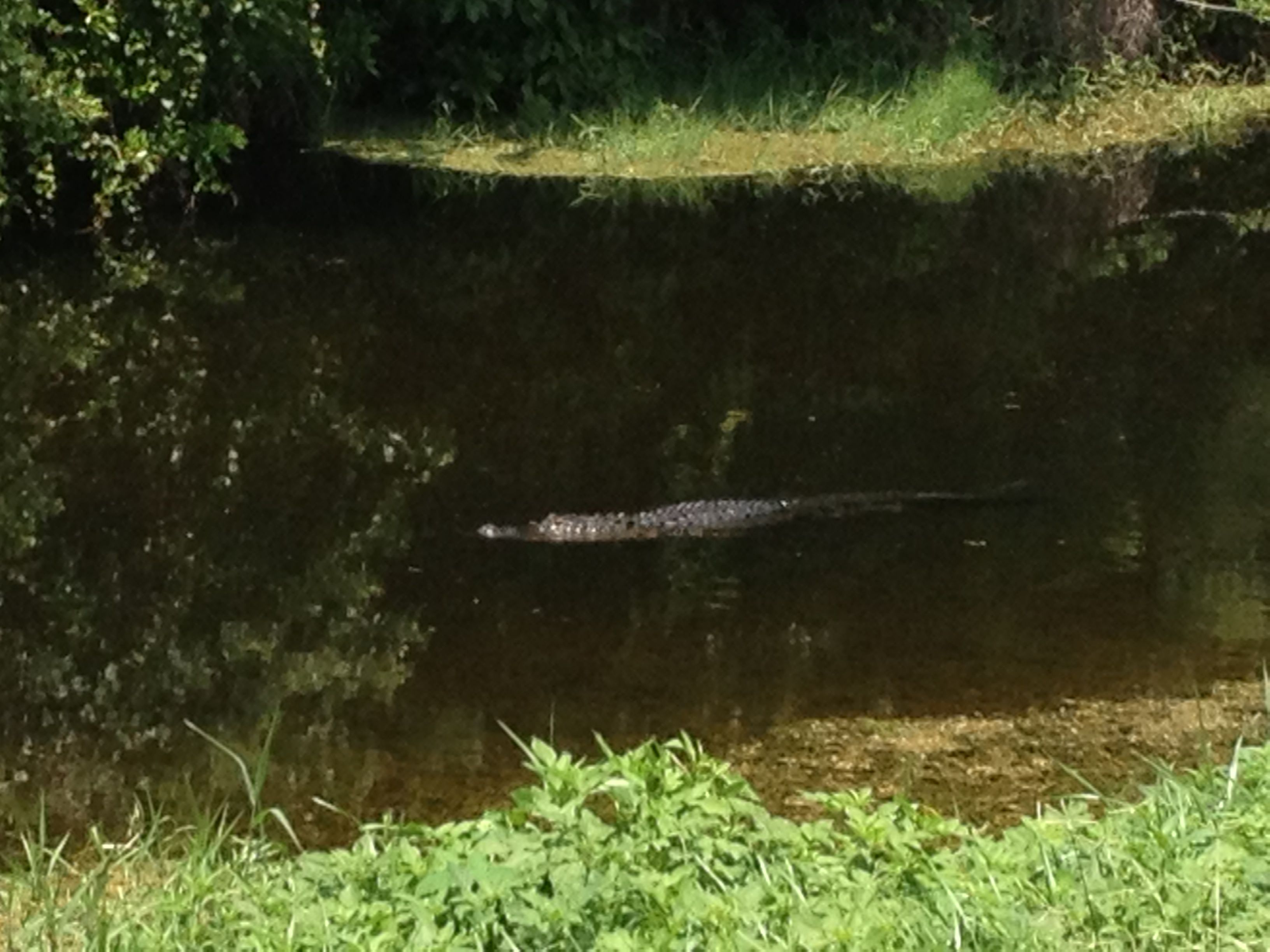
Alligators can be spotted occasionally in the canal
