= Florida State Road 739 =

State highway in Florida, United States

State Road 739
- SR 739 in red, former alignment in grey

Route information
- Maintained by FDOT
- Length: 16.951 mi (27.280 km)

Major junctions
- South end: US 41 near San Carlos Park
- SR 80 in Fort Myers; SR 78 in North Fort Myers
- North end: US 41 near Cape Coral

Location
- Country: United States
- State: Florida

Highway system
- Florida State Highway System; Interstate; US; State; Former; Pre‑1945; Toll; Scenic
← SR 736	→ SR 742

State Road 739 (SR 739) is a 17-mile-long (27 km) commercial highway running from San Carlos Park, Florida to North Fort Myers that is also known as U.S. Route 41 Business for the northernmost six miles (9.7 km) of its route.

== Route description ==
The southern terminus of SR 739 is an intersection with US 41 near San Carlos Park. SR 739 is known as Michael G. Rippe Parkway for its first three miles. Immediately north of the southern terminus is an interchange with Alico Road (CR 840) which includes only a southbound exit and northbound entrance. SR 739 crosses the interchange and the Seminole Gulf Railway on a large overpass. From the Alico interchange, SR 739 becomes six lanes and continues north, paralleling the Seminole Gulf Railway and passing through the Briarcliff neighborhood.

At its intersection with Six Mile Cypress Parkway (SR 865) in south Fort Myers, SR 739 becomes known as Metro Parkway and continues northward. It is reduced to five lanes with a middle turn lane at the intersection with Daniels Parkway (CR 876). SR 739 then passes to the east of the Villas neighborhood, Page Field, and the Chico's World Headquarters. It intersects with Colonial Boulevard (SR 884), Lee County's primary east–west highway, shortly after entering Fort Myers city limits.

At Winkler Avenue, SR 739 becomes six lanes again and turns northwest. An overpass carries it over the Ten Mile Canal and the Seminole Gulf Railway's freight yard. At LeeTran Boulevard, the northbound lanes continue onto Evans Avenue, while the southbound lanes connect to Fowler Street.

SR 739 continues north along Evans Avenue and Fowler Street. Currently, Evans Avenue is a one-way street north of LeeTran Boulevard, and has three northbound lanes while Fowler Street carries four lanes of bi-directional traffic. This unusual configuration continues to just south of downtown Fort Myers at the intersection of State Road 82 (Dr. Martin Luther King Jr. Boulevard). Fowler Street's northbound lanes terminate at SR 82, and from here north, Evans Avenue (which becomes Park Avenue shortly after SR 82) carries all northbound traffic, and Fowler Street carries all southbound traffic with three lanes each.

At the intersection with SR 80 just east of downtown Fort Myers, SR 739 becomes concurrent with U.S. Route 41 Business, and SR 739 becomes a hidden designation from this point north. It then intersects SR 80 and crosses the Caloosahatchee River on the Edison Bridge. The northbound and southbound streets rejoin into a single six-lane roadway at the north end of the Edison Bridge spans, and travel into North Fort Myers, Florida along the original Tamiami Trail.

SR 739 is then reduced to four lanes divided after the intersection of Pine Island Road/Bayshore Road (SR 78), and terminates shortly after at the mainline of US 41 north of North Fort Myers.

== History ==
Fowler Street and Evans Avenue (which carry SR 739 near Downtown Fort Myers) were early city streets. Evans Avenue is named for Major James Evans, the founder of Fort Myers. Fowler Street is named for Captain W.H. Fowler, a U.S. soldier who fought in the Seminole Wars. Fowler's grave was discovered in 1885 in a military cemetery that once existed near the intersection of Fowler and Second streets. Francis A. Hendry, one of the first councilmen of Fort Myers, proposed naming the street after Fowler. Today, a historic plaque on Fowler Street near Second Street marks the location of the former cemetery.

The northern portion of SR 739 through North Fort Myers was originally the route of Tamiami Trail (U.S. Route 41), a roadway connecting Tampa and Miami. The route through North Fort Myers north of Pine Island Road was complete in the 1920s along with the rest of Tamiami Trail. The route from there to Downtown Fort Myers was completed in 1931 when the original Edison Bridge over the Caloosahatchee River opened, which connected with Fowler Street on the south side of the river. Tamiami Trail's previous bridge was located further upstream connecting Old Bridge Road with Freemont Street. US 41 would carry the hidden designation SR 45 after the 1945 Florida State Road renumbering.

In 1964, US 41 was rerouted to its current alignment to the west upon the completion of the Caloosahatchee Bridge. After the realignment of US 41, the original route became US 41 Business with the hidden designation of State Road 739.

The Metro Parkway portion of SR 739 was originally developed as three roadways that were then planned to be part of an eastern bypass to US 41. The first segment was short local road known as Hardee Street that ran south from Hanson Street. In the early 1980s, Metro Drive was built as a four-lane road from Colonial Boulevard (SR 884) north to connect with the south end of Hardee Street (Winkler Avenue was also extended to connect with Metro Drive at the time). From Colonial south to Daniels Road, the road was initially named Canal Road, which was named since it paralleled the Ten Mile Canal. Canal Road was a two-lane road largely built due to a boom in need for new business sites, and landowners along the route financed its construction. In 1982, the road was complete from Hanson Street south to Daniels Road, which would be fully known as Metro Parkway within a few years. By the time Metro Parkway was complete, the SR 739 designation ran south along Fowler Street, then east along Hanson Street, and south along Metro Parkway.

Metro Parkway was extended south to Six Mile Cypress Parkway in 1990. This extension was built privately to support Gulf Coast Hospital (known today as Gulf Coast Medical Center), which also opened in 1990. Metro Parkway was then widened to four lanes from Colonial Boulevard to Daniels Parkway in 1991.

SR 739 was split into its current alignment of one-way street pairs north of SR 82 in the early 1990s when the current dual Edison Bridge spans were completed, replacing the original drawbridge. SR 739 also became a six-lane roadway between SR 82 and SR 78 at the same time. More of Evans Avenue was converted to one-way as far south as Hanson Street in the late 2000s to carry SR 739 northbound. This was part of a larger project that would have later converted the adjacent segment of Fowler Street to one-way to be Evans Avenue's southbound counterpart. However, further conversion of Fowler Street was heavily opposed by the city of Fort Myers and local business owners, and was subsequently cancelled (though Evans Avenue's conversion had already been completed).

The North Fort Myers segment of SR 739 from SR 78 to Littleton Road was widened to four lanes in the late 2000s. The rest of the road north of there to US 41 was widened to four lanes in 2015.

Metro Parkway was widened to six lanes from Daniels Parkway to Six Mile Cypress Parkway in 2010. The owners of Gulf Coast Hospital loaned the state money for the widening, which allowed the project to start a few years earlier than planned.

SR 739 was extended to its current southern terminus in late 2012 with the completion of Michael G. Rippe Parkway. That extension, which was named for former Florida Department of Transportation district director Michael G. Rippe, had been planned as early as the 1990s and was funded by the American Recovery and Reinvestment Act of 2009.

The current alignment of SR 739 between Winkler Avenue and Hanson Street, which included the overpass over the Seminole Gulf Railway yard, was completed in late 2015. This removed SR 739 from Hanson Street, and the original alignment of Metro Parkway was renamed Old Metro Parkway.

== Major intersections ==
The entire route is in Lee County.

Location	mi	km	Destinations	Notes
	0.000	0.000	US 41 (Tamiami Trail / SR 45) – Naples, Fort Myers	Southern terminus
	0.34	0.55	Alico Road (CR 840 east) to I-75	Interchange; southbound exit and northbound entrance; western terminus of CR 840
	2.785	4.482	SR 865 south / CR 865 north (Six Mile Cypress Parkway) to US 41 – Fort Myers Beach, Sanibel, Captiva, Airport	Northern terminus of SR 865; southern terminus of CR 865
	4.042	6.505	CR 876 (Daniels Parkway) to I-75 – Airport	
Fort Myers	7.600	12.231	SR 884 (Colonial Boulevard) to I-75	
Fort Myers			Lee Tran Boulevard (SR 740 west)	
Fort Myers			Fowler Street (CR 863 south)	Access from southbound one-way SR 739 only; northern terminus of CR 863
Fort Myers	11.123	17.901	SR 82 (Martin Luther King Jr. Boulevard) to I-75 – Imaginarium	
Fort Myers	11.523	18.544	SR 80 east (Second Street) to I-75	South end of US 41 Bus. concurrency (northbound)
Fort Myers	11.666	18.775	SR 80 west (First Street)	South end of US 41 Bus. concurrency (southbound)
Caloosahatchee River (Okeechobee Waterway)	11.723– 12.723	18.866– 20.476	Edison Bridge	
North Fort Myers	13.373	21.522	CR 78A west (Pondella Road)	Eastern terminus of CR 78A
North Fort Myers	14.425	23.215	SR 78 (Pine Island Road / Bayshore Road) to I-75 – Lee Civic Center, Cape Coral	
	16.951	27.280	US 41 (Cleveland Avenue / Tamiami Trail / SR 45)	Northern terminus
1.000 mi = 1.609 km; 1.000 km = 0.621 mi: Concurrency terminus; Incomplete access

== Related roads ==
=== Fowler Street ===
County Road 863
- Location: Fort Myers
- Length: 1.8 mi (2.9 km)

From the north end of Metro Parkway, SR 739 southbound runs along Fowler Street in Fort Myers. South of Metro Parkway, Fowler Street continues under county control with the unsigned designation of County Road 863 (CR 863) to Colonial Boulevard and connects to US 41 at Boy Scout Drive near Page Field.

CR 863 was built in the early 1960s when Fowler Street was extended south of Hanson Street to just north of Page Field at North Airport Road, which connected it to US 41. Fowler Street was widened to four lanes in 1974. A year later, Page Field opened a new passenger terminal at the end of Fowler Street. This terminal ceased operation in 1983 when commercial air service was relocated to the new Southwest Florida Regional Airport. The terminal still stands and is now primarily occupied by the Florida Department of Law Enforcement.

In the mid-1990s, Fowler Street was realigned around Page Field's Runway 13 and extended to connect directly to US 41 at Boy Scout Drive, which continues a short distance to Summerlin Road (CR 869).

Despite the realignment of Metro Parkway to connect with Fowler Street in 2015, Lee County still maintains Fowler Street between Metro Parkway and Hanson Street, though this section carries the SR 739 designation.

Major intersections

mi	km	Destinations	Notes
0.00	0.00	US 41 (Cleveland Avenue)	
1.30	2.09	SR 884 (Colonial Boulevard) to I-75	
3.00	4.83	SR 739 south (Metro Parkway / Fowler Street)	Two-way street carries southbound direction of SR 739
1.000 mi = 1.609 km; 1.000 km = 0.621 mi

=== Hanson Street & Old Metro Parkway ===
Prior to 2015, Hanson Street carried the SR 739 designation from Fowler Street east to the previous alignment of Metro Parkway, now known as Old Metro Parkway. Despite the reroute, this segment of Hanson Street remains under state maintenance though Old Metro Parkway was relinquished to city control after the realignment. Hanson Street continues west of Fowler Street as a city street to US 41 and Cortez Boulevard. It also continues east of Old Metro Parkway under city control to Ortiz Avenue (CR 865). Hanson Street was extended from Veronica S. Shoemaker Boulevard to Ortiz Avenue in December 2020.

Hanson Street was an early city street, and is named for Dr. William Hanson. Hanson came to Fort Myers in 1884 and befriended and treated the Seminole Indian tribe. Hanson's son, W. Stanley Hanson, served as tax collector and commissioner in Lee County.
