= Florida State Road 736 =

State highway in Florida, United States

State Road 736
- Davie Boulevard

Route information
- Maintained by FDOT
- Length: 4.033 mi (6.490 km)

Major junctions
- West end: US 441 in Fort Lauderdale
- I-95 in Fort Lauderdale
- East end: US 1 in Fort Lauderdale

Location
- Country: United States
- State: Florida
- Counties: Broward

Highway system
- Florida State Highway System; Interstate; US; State; Former; Pre‑1945; Toll; Scenic
← SR 732	→ SR 739

Locally known as Davie Boulevard, State Road 736 (SR 736) is a 4.033 miles (6.490 km) long commuter highway serving central Broward County, Florida, USA. It extends from its western terminus at an intersection with US 441-SR 7 in Fort Lauderdale to the eastern terminus being an intersection with South Federal Highway (US 1-SR 5) in Fort Lauderdale.

== Route description ==
State Road 736 begins on Davie Boulevard at the intersection with US 441, with SR 736 heading east through a mix of commercial and residential areas in Fort Lauderdale. Two miles east of the western terminus, SR 736 has an interchange with Interstate 95 and continues through a residential area before crossing a drawbridge over a canal. East of the canal, it continues through the residential areas approaching central Fort Lauderdale. East of the railroad tracks, SR 736 also becomes known as SE 12th Street and becomes a more commercial route as it quickly approaches its eastern terminus of US 1.

West of US 441, the road extends west as Peters Road and extends for 3.8 miles (6.1 km) to an intersection with Pine Island Road in Plantation.

== History ==
The route was originally designated State Road 82 by the State Road Department, the forerunner of Florida Department of Transportation. In the 1980s, FDOT extended the State Road designation 3.1 miles (5.0 km) westward from US 441 along Peters Road and gave the State Road its current designation. In the 2000s, the road was truncated back to the original US 441/SR 7 terminus.

Until the extension and redesignation in Broward County, SR 82 was an "interrupted" state road, for there was - and still is - a SR 82 in southwestern Florida (from Fort Myers to near Immokalee, Florida).

=== Former S-736 ===
In Bay County, 11th Street (in the Panama City grid) between Beck Ave (US Bus 98) and Tyndall Pkwy (US 98) was once signed as State Road S-736. The road was given to the county in the late 1970s, and then in the early 1980s, the county began replacing the state road shields with standard blue pentagon signs which designated the highway as County Road 736. Very soon after that, the road was renumbered as County Road 28, and signage today still reflects that change. (It seems out-of-place for this road to have a two-digit designation, not only because the road was formerly only a secondary state highway, but also because two-digit designations are usually reserved for longer roads.)

== Major intersections ==
The entire route is in Broward County.

Location	mi	km	Destinations	Notes
Plantation–Fort Lauderdale line	0.000	0.000	US 441 (SR 7) to I-595 / Florida's Turnpike	west end of state maintenance
Fort Lauderdale	2.07	3.33	I-95 (SR 9) to I-595 – West Palm Beach, Miami	I-95 exit 26
Fort Lauderdale	2.620– 2.698	4.216– 4.342	Davie Boulevard Bridge over South Fork New River	
Fort Lauderdale	4.033	6.490	US 1 (Federal Highway / SR 5) – Beach	Eastern terminus
1.000 mi = 1.609 km; 1.000 km = 0.621 mi
