= Calusa Nature Center and Planetarium =

Non-profit environmental organization in Fort Myers, Florida, United States

Coordinates: 26.61581°N 81.81237°W

- Type: Nature center, Planetarium
- Location: Fort Myers, Florida
- Website: www.calusanature.org

Calusa Nature Center and Planetarium is a non-profit environmental education organization in Fort Myers, Florida. Located on 105 acres, the Center includes a natural history museum with live native and teaching animals, and exhibits about the animals, plants and environment of Southwest Florida.

There are three nature trails, a planetarium, a butterfly house, and a raptor aviary with rehabilitated (but un-releasable) birds of prey. There is also a gift shop, meeting space, classroom, and picnic areas.

The 44'(13.4-meter) diameter planetarium seats 90 and features fulldome full-surround planetarium shows 7 days/week, changing the shows on a monthly basis; they have a collection of meteorites in their display area. The planetarium presents evening laser shows quarterly and Calusa Nature Center and Planetarium staff do educational outreach to local schools and civic groups.

== Programs For Lifelong Learning ==
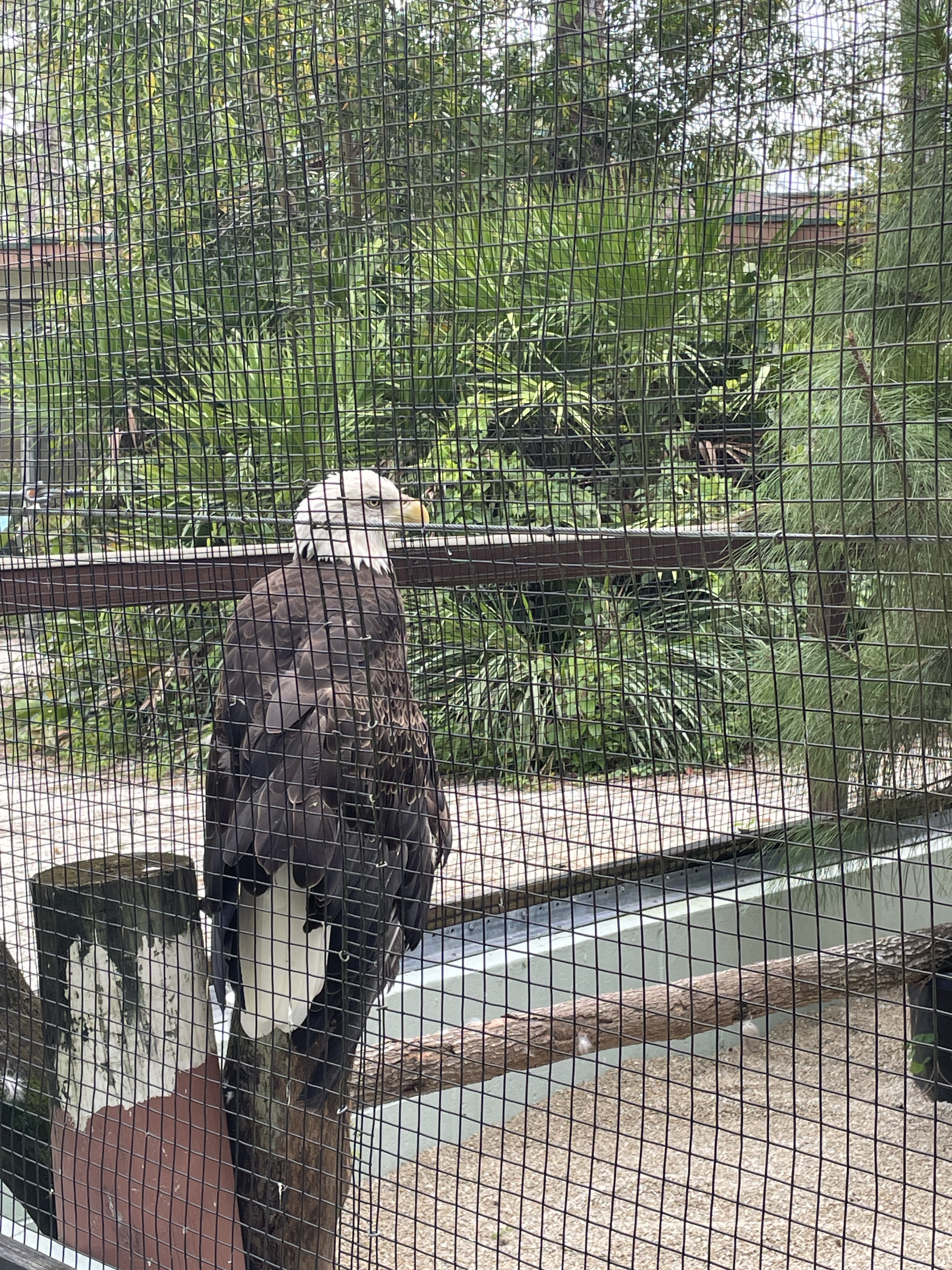
Eagle at the recovery center.

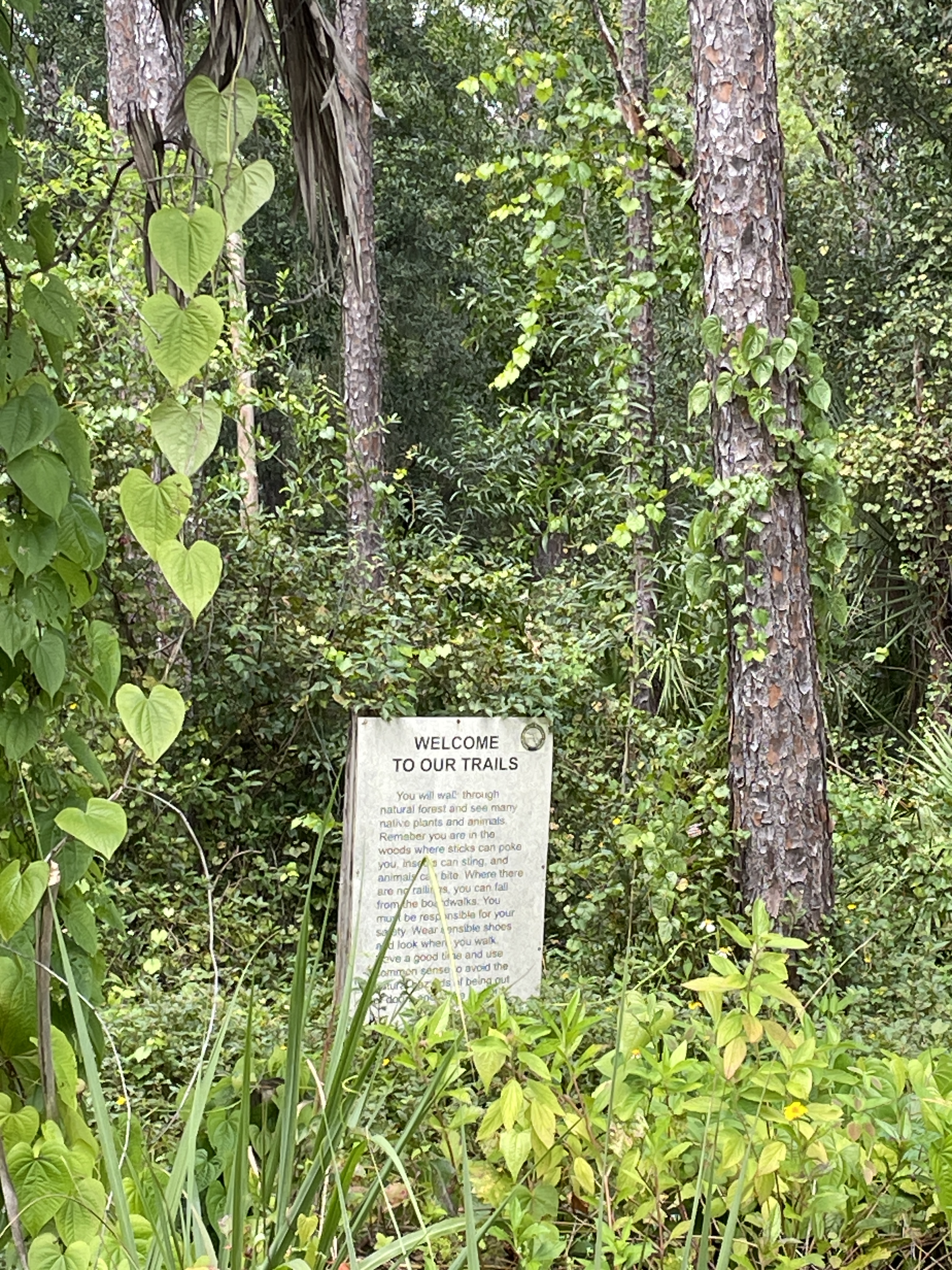
One of the trail signs at the center.

Calusa Nature Center and Planetarium offers a variety of lifelong learning programs. They offer monthly nature speakers, science Sundays, planetarium shows, and night hikes. The museum has a Montessori school for young children and has a homeschool program that occurs 3 out of 5 days a week providing classes on astronomy, ecology, and more.

Calusa Nature Center and Planetarium is also affiliated with the Southwest Florida Astronomical Society and provides access to its facilities to promote learning for those 18 and up. Members of the community can benefit from a small bookshelf section that contains free books, local magazines, and information accessible to the public.

For families who homeschool, Calusa Nature Center and Planetarium offers a monthly series on study topics such as Zoology, Entomology, and more. Each class is designed to build on the previous. Students can choose which classes from the series they wish to participate in. Classes include classroom instruction and activities such as crafts, short hikes, animal encounters, and more. For more information regarding homeschool courses or other lifelong learning programs check out the Calusa Nature Center and Planetarium education page on their official website.

Programs:

- Nature Speakers
- Science Sundays
- Planetarium Shows
- Night Hikes
- Home School Classes
- Montessori School
- Community Book Shelf
