= Florida State Road 82 =

Highway in Florida

State Road 82
- Dr. Martin Luther King Jr. Boulevard
- SR 82 highlighted in red

Route information
- Maintained by FDOT
- Length: 29.884 mi (48.094 km)
- Existed: June 11, 1945–present

Major junctions
- West end: US 41 / SR 867 in Fort Myers
- I-75 in Fort Myers
- East end: SR 29 near Immokalee

Location
- Country: United States
- State: Florida
- Counties: Lee, Hendry, Collier

Highway system
- Florida State Highway System; Interstate; US; State; Former; Pre‑1945; Toll; Scenic
← SR 81	→ SR 83

State Road 82 (SR 82) is a 29-mile-long east–west highway serving northern Lee and Collier County, Florida (and "clipping" the southwest corner of Hendry County). The western terminus is an intersection with Cleveland Avenue (US 41-SR 45, part of the Tamiami Trail) in Fort Myers; the eastern terminus is an intersection with SR 29 midway between Immokalee and Felda.

== Route description ==
State Road 82 begins in Downtown Fort Myers at US 41. Motorists continuing past the western terminus of SR 82 travel along McGregor Boulevard (SR 867). Other State Roads within a few blocks of the western terminus include SR 80 (western terminus located two blocks to the north) and SR 739-Business US 41 one-half mile (0.80 km) to the east.

Between Business US 41 (SR 739) and Interstate 75 (SR 93), SR 82 is a divided residential/commuter road. Within the city of Fort Myers, it is known as Dr. Martin Luther King Jr. Boulevard.

After intersecting Interstate 75, it continues east and passes close to Lehigh Acres. SR 82 intersects Daniels Parkway and Gunnery Road at a continuous-flow intersection near Lehigh Acres. As it continues east, it crosses the southwest Florida farmlands and wetlands, a part of Big Cypress Swamp and the western edge of the Everglades drainage system. After clipping the southwest corner of Hendry County, SR 82 enters Collier County and it briefly loses its median and becomes a two-lane agricultural road but expands back to a four-lane divided road about four miles later. SR 82 then comes to an end at a roundabout with SR 29 just north of Immokalee.

== History ==
SR 82 was originally named Anderson Avenue within Fort Myers and it was an early city street. Anderson Avenue was named for Dr. Richard Anderson, who is believed to be the first physician to set up a practice and drug store in Fort Myers. The street was named for Dr. Anderson in 1885, one year after his death.

In the early 1900s, Anderson Avenue was extended east from Fort Myers to Buckingham. The road ran from Fort Myers east to present-day Buckingham Road, which was built at the same time, creating a direct route from Fort Myers to Buckingham.

The road was built as a dirt road from present-day Buckingham Road to Immokalee in the 1930s. The road was officially added to the state highway system in 1931 as SR 184. It was paved in the 1940s. The extension to Immokalee was often referred to as Immokalee Road for many years, though that name has been phased out and is now used on the nearby CR 846, which runs from Immokalee to Naples.

During the 1945 Florida State Road renumbering, SR 184 was changed to SR 82. Until the 1980s, SR 82 was an "interrupted" state road, for there was concurrently a Fort Lauderdale street (Davie Boulevard) with SR 82 signage. In the 1980s, Davie Boulevard's SR 82 signage was replaced with signs showing its current designation, SR 736.

In 1991, SR 82 west of I-75 in Fort Myers was renamed from Anderson Avenue to its current name, Dr. Martin Luther King Jr. Boulevard. The road was rededicated with its new name on January 15, 1991, which is Dr. King's birthday.

Much of SR 82 east of Interstate 75 was upgraded and widened to a multi-lane divided highway in the 2010s and early 2020s. The continuous-flow intersection (CFI) at the Daniels Parkway/Gunnery Road (CR 876) intersection was the first CFI built in Florida, which became fully operational on July 9, 2019.

== Future ==
The Florida Department of Transportation is planning to widen the remaining undivided two-lane segment of SR 82 from the Collier County line to Gator Slough lane. The design phase for this project is currently underway.

== Major intersections ==
County	Location	mi	km	Destinations	Notes
Lee	Fort Myers	0.000	0.000	McGregor Boulevard to US 41	
Lee	Fort Myers	0.200	0.322	US 41 Bus. west (Monroe Street) to US 41	Monroe Street is inventoried as part of SR 82
Lee	Fort Myers	0.645	1.038	SR 739 south (Fowler Street)	temporary southern terminus of US 41 Bus. south
Lee	Fort Myers	0.756	1.217	US 41 Bus. north (Evans Avenue / SR 739) – North Fort Myers	
Lee	Fort Myers	3.826	6.157	CR 865 (Ortiz Avenue)	
Lee	Fort Myers	4.400	7.081	I-75 – Tampa, Naples	Exit 138 on I-75
Lee	Fort Myers	6.154	9.904	Buckingham Road	Former SR 82A
Lee	Fort Myers	6.874	11.063	CR 884 (Lee Boulevard / Colonial Boulevard) to I-75 – Lehigh Acres, Fort Myers	Former SR 82B east
Lee	Lehigh Acres	11.123	17.901	Gunnery Road / Daniels Parkway (CR 876) to I-75 – Airport	Continuous-flow intersection
Hendry	No major junctions				
Collier		24.521	39.463	CR 850 south (Corkscrew Road)	Northern terminus of CR 850
Collier		29.884	48.094	SR 29 – LaBelle, Immokalee, Everglades	
1.000 mi = 1.609 km; 1.000 km = 0.621 mi

== Related Roads ==
=== Monroe Street ===
Monroe Street intersects SR 82 in Downtown Fort Myers just east of US 41. Monroe Street from SR 82 north to Main Street is state-maintained and is inventoried by FDOT as part of SR 82. Westbound traffic is directed via Monroe Street to access US 41 via Main Street since US 41 cannot be accessed from SR 82. Traffic on SR 82 can only access McGregor Boulevard at this intersection.

=== Former State Road 82A ===
State Road 82A (SR 82A) was the former designation for Buckingham Road, which connects with SR 82 nearly 2 miles east of Interstate 75. Buckingham Road was previously SR 82A from SR 82 to a point near Buckingham Field. North of here, it was designated SR 861 (which was also signed along the discontinuous Homestead Road in Lehigh Acres). Buckingham Road has since been relinquished to county control and has no route designation at SR 82 (though it is now has the hidden designation of CR 876 beyond Gunnery Road).

=== Former State Road 82B ===
The former State Road 82B (SR 82B), locally known as Lee Boulevard, ran from SR 82 east to Lehigh Acres. It was later relinquished to county control, and it was redesignated as CR 884 after Colonial Boulevard (CR 884) was extended to Lee Boulevard at SR 82 in 1990.
