= San Carlos Park, Florida =

- Census-designated place
- Location in Lee County and the state of Florida
- Coordinates: 26°28′36″N 81°49′10″W
- Country: United States
- State: Florida
- County: Lee

Area
  - Total: 4.97 sq mi (12.87 km^{2})
  - Land: 4.72 sq mi (12.23 km^{2})
  - Water: 0.25 sq mi (0.64 km^{2})
- Elevation: 13 ft (4.0 m)

Population (2020)
  - Total: 18,563
  - Density: 3,930.5/sq mi (1,517.58/km^{2})
- Time zone: UTC-5 (Eastern (EST))
  - Summer (DST): UTC-4 (EDT)
- ZIP code: 33912, 33967
- Area code: 239
- FIPS code: 12-63425
- GNIS feature ID: 2402821

San Carlos Park is a census-designated place (CDP) in Lee County, Florida, United States. The population was 18,563 at the 2020 census, up from 16,824 at the 2010 census. It is part of the Cape Coral-Fort Myers, Florida Metropolitan Statistical Area.

== Geography ==
San Carlos Park is located in south-central Lee County. It is an unincorporated community, bordered to the south by the village of Estero and to the east by the Three Oaks CDP. U.S. Route 41 forms the western edge of San Carlos Park, leading north 13 miles (21 km) to Fort Myers, the county seat, and south through Estero and Bonita Springs 22 miles (35 km) to Naples.

According to the United States Census Bureau, the San Carlos Park CDP has a total area of 5.0 square miles (12.9 km^{2}), of which 4.7 square miles (12.2 km^{2}) are land and 0.2 square miles (0.6 km^{2}), or 4.93%, are water. The land in the CDP drains west via Mullock Creek to Estero Bay, an estuary connected to the Gulf of Mexico.

== Demographics ==
Historical population
Census	Pop.	Note	%±
1980	3,950		—
1990	11,785		198.4%
2000	16,317		38.5%
2010	16,824		3.1%
2020	18,563		10.3%

=== 2020 census ===
As of the 2020 census, San Carlos Park had a population of 18,563. The median age was 34.6 years. 22.2% of residents were under the age of 18 and 11.6% of residents were 65 years of age or older. For every 100 females there were 106.5 males, and for every 100 females age 18 and over there were 106.2 males age 18 and over.

100.0% of residents lived in urban areas, while 0.0% lived in rural areas.

There were 6,650 households in San Carlos Park, of which 33.8% had children under the age of 18 living in them. Of all households, 45.9% were married-couple households, 21.1% were households with a male householder and no spouse or partner present, and 22.4% were households with a female householder and no spouse or partner present. About 18.7% of all households were made up of individuals and 6.9% had someone living alone who was 65 years of age or older.

There were 7,255 housing units, of which 8.3% were vacant. The homeowner vacancy rate was 0.7% and the rental vacancy rate was 9.4%.

Racial composition as of the 2020 census
Race	Number	Percent
White	12,654	68.2%
Black or African American	549	3.0%
American Indian and Alaska Native	149	0.8%
Asian	308	1.7%
Native Hawaiian and Other Pacific Islander	5	0.0%
Some other race	1,993	10.7%
Two or more races	2,905	15.6%
Hispanic or Latino (of any race)	5,899	31.8%

=== 2000 census ===
At the 2000 census there were 16,317 people, 5,901 households, and 4,449 families in the CDP. The population density was 3,360.5 inhabitants per square mile (1,297.5/km^{2}). There were 6,580 housing units at an average density of 1,355.2 per square mile (523.2/km^{2}). The racial makup of the CDP was 93.84% White, 1.26% African American, 0.34% Native American, 0.70% Asian, 0.01% Pacific Islander, 2.31% from other races, and 1.54% from two or more races. Hispanic or Latino of any race were 8.14%.

Of the 5,901 households 42.5% had children under the age of 18 living with them, 58.2% were married couples living together, 11.3% had a female householder with no husband present, and 24.6% were non-families. 16.5% of households were one person and 4.4% were one person aged 65 or older. The average household size was 2.77 and the average family size was 3.09.

The age distribution was 29.3% under the age of 18, 6.9% from 18 to 24, 36.7% from 25 to 44, 18.5% from 45 to 64, and 8.7% 65 or older. The median age was 34 years. For every 100 females, there were 102.3 males. For every 100 females age 18 and over, there were 98.6 males.

The median household income was $45,870 and the median family income was $48,740. Males had a median income of $31,768 versus $25,541 for females. The per capita income for the CDP was $19,022. About 6.1% of families and 8.0% of the population were below the poverty line, including 8.8% of those under age 18 and 7.2% of those age 65 or over.

== History ==
Brothers Jules & Jack Freeman established San Carlos Park in 1953 in hopes of providing low cost homes for the middle class.

The Freeman group purchased their land from the Koreshan Unity who gave them almost 250 acres for just under $3,000. When they acquired the land in Estero, Florida, they found that it was in the middle of nowhere, with the county seat, Fort Myers, Florida, being over 20 miles away.

In the 1970s, the Freeman's drilled down into the ground and hit a spring, this spring would become a local attraction located at the San Carlos Park arches

Later on in the mid-1970s the Freeman group would go on to begin construction of their next community Three Oaks, Florida.
