= Page Field =

Airport in Florida, U.S.

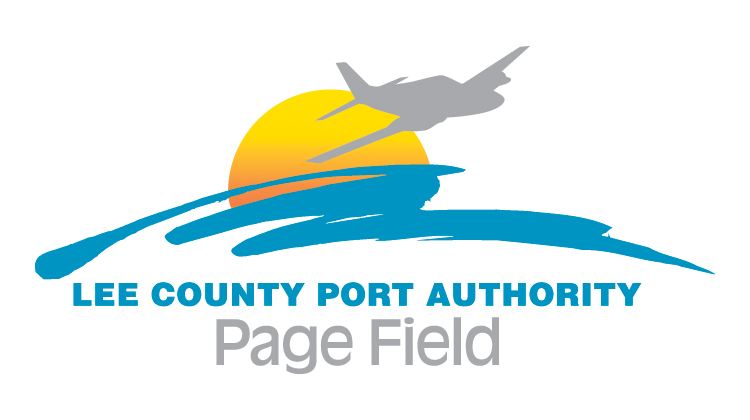
- IATA: FMY; ICAO: KFMY; FAA LID: FMY

Summary
- Airport type: Public
- Owner: Lee County Port Authority
- Serves: Fort Myers, Florida
- Elevation AMSL: 17 ft (5.2 m)
- Coordinates: 26°35′12″N 081°51′48″W
- Website: www.flyfmy.com

Maps
- FAA diagram

- Location of airport FMY (the United States)

Runways
Direction	Length		Surface
Direction	ft	m	Surface
5/23	6,406	1,953	Asphalt
13/31	4,910	1,497	Asphalt

Statistics (2019)
- Aircraft operations: 114,863
- Based aircraft: 244
- Source: Federal Aviation Administration

Page Field (IATA: FMY, ICAO: KFMY, FAA LID: FMY) is a public airport located in Fort Myers, in Lee County, Florida, United States. It is owned by the Lee County Port Authority; the National Plan of Integrated Airport Systems for 2011–2015 categorized it as a reliever airport.

== History ==
In 1924, the city of Fort Myers purchased 670 acres of land south of the city with the intention of developing it into a municipal golf course. However, the golf course never came to fruition and it was instead developed into a civil airport. The airport commenced operation in 1926 with unpaved sod runways. Daily air mail service subsequently began to Fort Myers. In its early days, the airport was nicknamed "Palmetto Field" for the large amount of palmetto brush growing in and around the airport. Passenger air service began at the airport in 1937 when National Airlines commenced regular flights. However, those were soon discontinued due to the poor landing conditions on the unpaved runways.

The city of Fort Myers deeded the airport to Lee County in 1939, and the airport was then known as Lee County Airport. Efforts to upgrade the airfield were boosted by a January 1940 Works Projects Administration (WPA) project that constructed three concrete runways. In addition, other improvements were made and by the time of the Pearl Harbor Attack, Lee County Airport had grown to about 600 acres in size. After the improvements were complete, National Airlines resumed service to the airport.

During World War II, Lee County Airport was leased by the United States Department of War and was then known as Fort Myers Army Air Base. It was used by the United States Army Air Forces Third Air Force for antisubmarine patrols and conventional bomber training in the B-24 Liberator. The facility returned to civil control of the State of Florida and then Lee County shortly after the end of the war.

On May 21, 1942 (while still under control of the War Department), the Lee County Commission officially named the airport Page Field. Page Field was named in honor of Captain Richard Channing Page, a local World War I aviator killed in a seaplane accident near Everglades, Florida on March 3, 1920. Captain Page was the first person from Florida to join the Aviation Section, U.S. Signal Corps. During World War I, he was credited with three German aircraft destroyed in combat and was the recipient of the Distinguished Service Cross along with the French Croix de Guerre and other awards. Despite the name change, the Army continued to refer to the airport as Fort Myers Army Air Base until the end of the war.

In the 1950s, National Airlines was still the only passenger airline at Page Field (FMY), with six departures a day. During the decade, the U.S. Army barracks were replaced with a small terminal on the south side of the field, which was expanded in 1960. A new larger passenger terminal on the north side of Page Field opened on November 1, 1975.

National's 727s were the first jets at FMY, in winter 1965–66; FMY's longest runway was 5,002 feet. Except for commuter airlines, National was alone at FMY until, Eastern Air Lines arrived in December of 1975, a month after the new terminal opened. In 1981, the airport was served by Air Florida, Delta Air Lines, Eastern Air Lines, Florida Airlines, Northwest Airlines, Pan American World Airways (Pan Am), Sun Air, Trans World Airlines (TWA), and United Airlines.

After deregulation of the airline industry in 1978, it became clear that Page Field was too small for future demand, and on May 14, 1983, the airlines moved to the new Southwest Florida Regional Airport, now called Southwest Florida International Airport (RSW). Page Field is a designated FAA reliever airport for RSW and has only general aviation, military, and business traffic.

Since May 14, 1983 through the end of 2019, Page Field has handled 3,483,598 aircraft operations, average 94,506 annually. In 1987, the airport experienced its busiest year ever, with 120,921 aircraft operations.

== Facilities ==
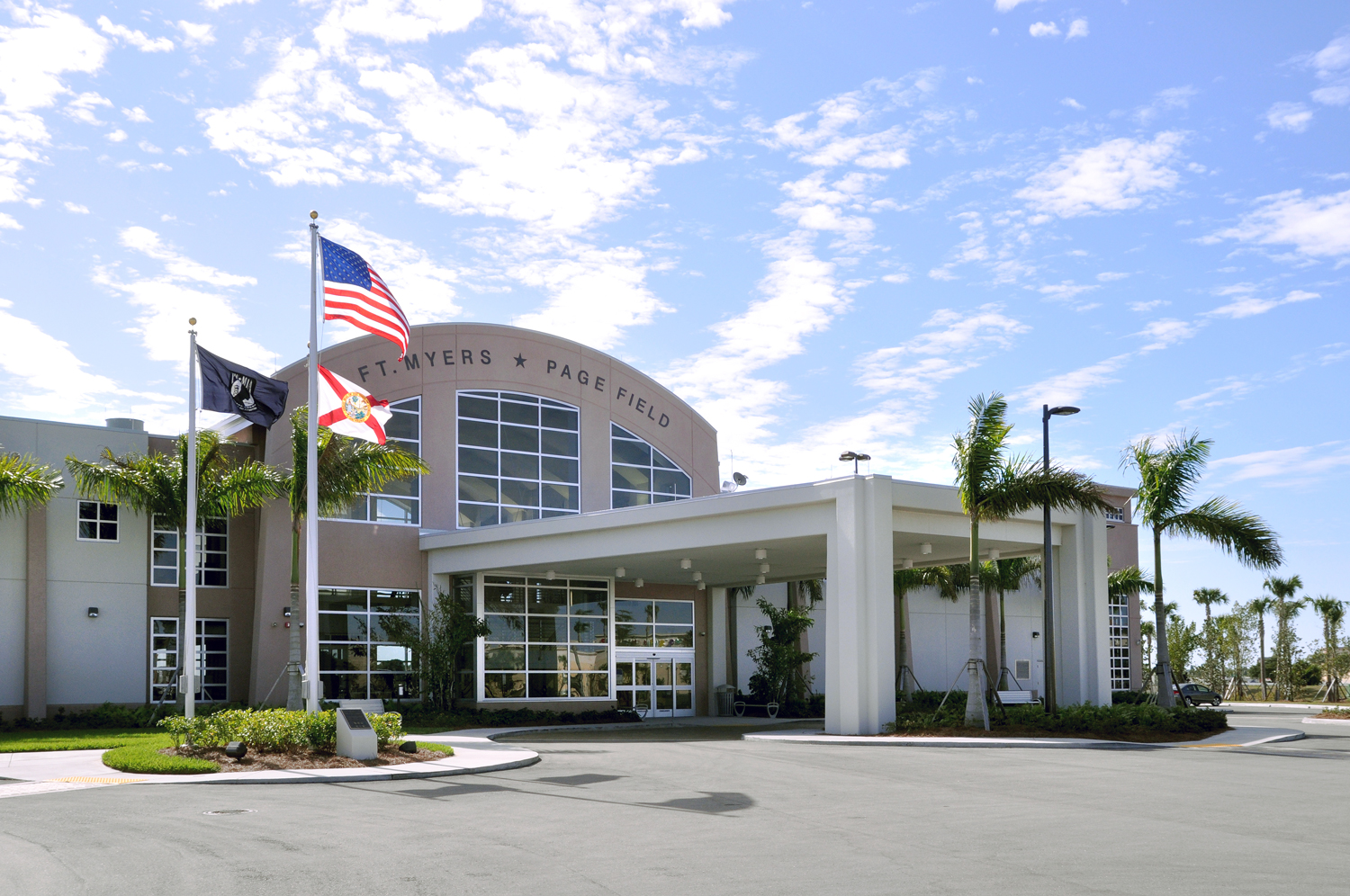
Base Operations at Page Field opened August 2011

Page Field covers 588 acres (238 ha) at an elevation of 17 feet (5 m). It has two asphalt paved runways: 5/23 is 6,406 by 150 feet (1,953 x 46 m) and 13/31 is 4,910 by 150 feet (1,497 x 46 m).

In 2019, the airport handled 114,863 operations, an average of 314 per day. More than 400 aircraft are based at Page Field as of January 2020. There are 21 local businesses operating at FMY, including aviation-related flight training, charter, avionics and maintenance facilities, in addition to community tenants.

In August 2011, a new terminal complex opened on the west side of Page Field. Base Operations at Page Field is a modern 22,600-square-foot building. Concierge front desk service, pilot lounges, weather briefing, flight planning and executive conference rooms, free Wi-Fi and a gift shop are offered at Base Operations. There is a 600,000-square-foot ramp with business aircraft parking, 24,000 square feet of itinerant hangar space and full-service Jet A and 100LL avgas, as well as self-serve 100LL avgas.

In October 2019, a new Multi-Use Hangar opened with 24,000 square feet, four crew offices and an additional 58,000 square feet of paved apron space to help address the seasonal demand for aircraft ramp parking.

The economic benefit of Page Field is $385 million annually according to the 2018 Florida Department of Transportation Economic Impact Study. 2018 Economic Impact Study conducted by Florida Department of Transportation

== Accidents & incidents ==
- On February 27, 2024, an armed man hijacked a parked Cessna 340A and attempted to fly it out. Instead, he crashed the airplane into a lightpole and a fence. The plane's wing snapped and the aircraft was totalled. The hijacker was sentenced to 12 years in prison and ordered to pay restitution.
- On May 9, 2026, a Cessna Citation X landed with its landing gear retracted at Page Field. The pilots reported they had failed to perform the before-landing checklist on approach and thus failed to notice that the landing gear was retracted.

== Awards ==
- Florida Department of Transportation named Page Field the General Aviation Airport of the Year in 2002 and 2008.

== See also ==
- List of airports in Florida
