= List of county roads in Glades County, Florida =

- County road shields used in Florida

Highway names
- Interstates: Interstate X (I-X)
- US Highways: U.S. Highway X (US X)
- State: State Road X (SR X)
- County: County Road X (CR-X)

System links
- County roads in Florida; County roads in Glades County

The following is a list of county roads in Glades County, Florida. All county roads are maintained by the county in which they reside.

== County roads in Glades County ==
Route	Road Name(s)	From	To	Notes
CR 17	Detjen's Dairy Road	US 27 (SR 25) north-northwest of Palmdale	Detjen's Dairy Road at the Highlands county line south-southeast of Venus	Former SR 17
CR 74	Old Lakeport Road NW	CR 74 at the Charlotte County line northwest of Muse Old Lakeport Road NW / Platt Road NW west-southwest of Lakeport	SR 29 south-southwest of Palmdale SR 78 in Lakeport	Former SR 74
CR 78		CR 78 / Howard Road at the Hendry County line west-northwest of LaBelle	CR 78 / Caloosa Estates Drive at the Hendry County line northwest of LaBelle	Former SR 78; travels along Hendry County line
CR 78A	Ortona Road	Entrance to Ortona Lock and Dam south-southeast of Ortona	SR 78 in Ortona	
CR 78B	Access Road; Hunter Road; Linda Road	SR 78 in Buckhead Ridge	SR 78 in Buckhead Ridge	Former SR 78B
CR 720	Walter Greer Road; Thigpen Road	Unnamed roads at Charlotte County line west of Muse US 27 (SR 25) south-southeast of Moore Haven	Marshall Field Road north of LaBelle CR 720 at the Hendry County line west-northwest of Clewiston	Former SR 720; hidden concurrency with CR 731
CR 721	Loop Road; State Road 78; Reservation Road	SR 78 east-northeast of Lakeport SR 78 northeast of Lakeport	SR 78 northeast of Lakeport CR 721 at the Highlands County line south-southwest of Brighton	Former SR 721; southern segment signed backward (traffic heading northbound is indicated to be heading south instead of north).
CR 721A	Red Barn Road; Harney Pond Road	Harney Pond Road / Red Barn Road north-northeast of Lakeport	CR 721 north-northeast of Lakeport	Former SR 721A; entirely within the Brighton Seminole Indian Reservation
CR 731	Whidden Road; State Highway 74; Tasmania Road	Whidden Road / Alex Boulevard at the Highlands County line north of LaBelle CR 74 west of Palmdale	CR 74 west of Palmdale CR 731 at the Highlands County line west-southwest of Venus	Former SR 731
CR 733	3rd Street; Main Street; Broadway Street NW	US 27 (SR 25) in Palmdale	US 27 (SR 25) / Broadway Street in Palmdale	Former SR 733
