= Moore Haven Junior Senior High School =

Moore Haven Middle High School
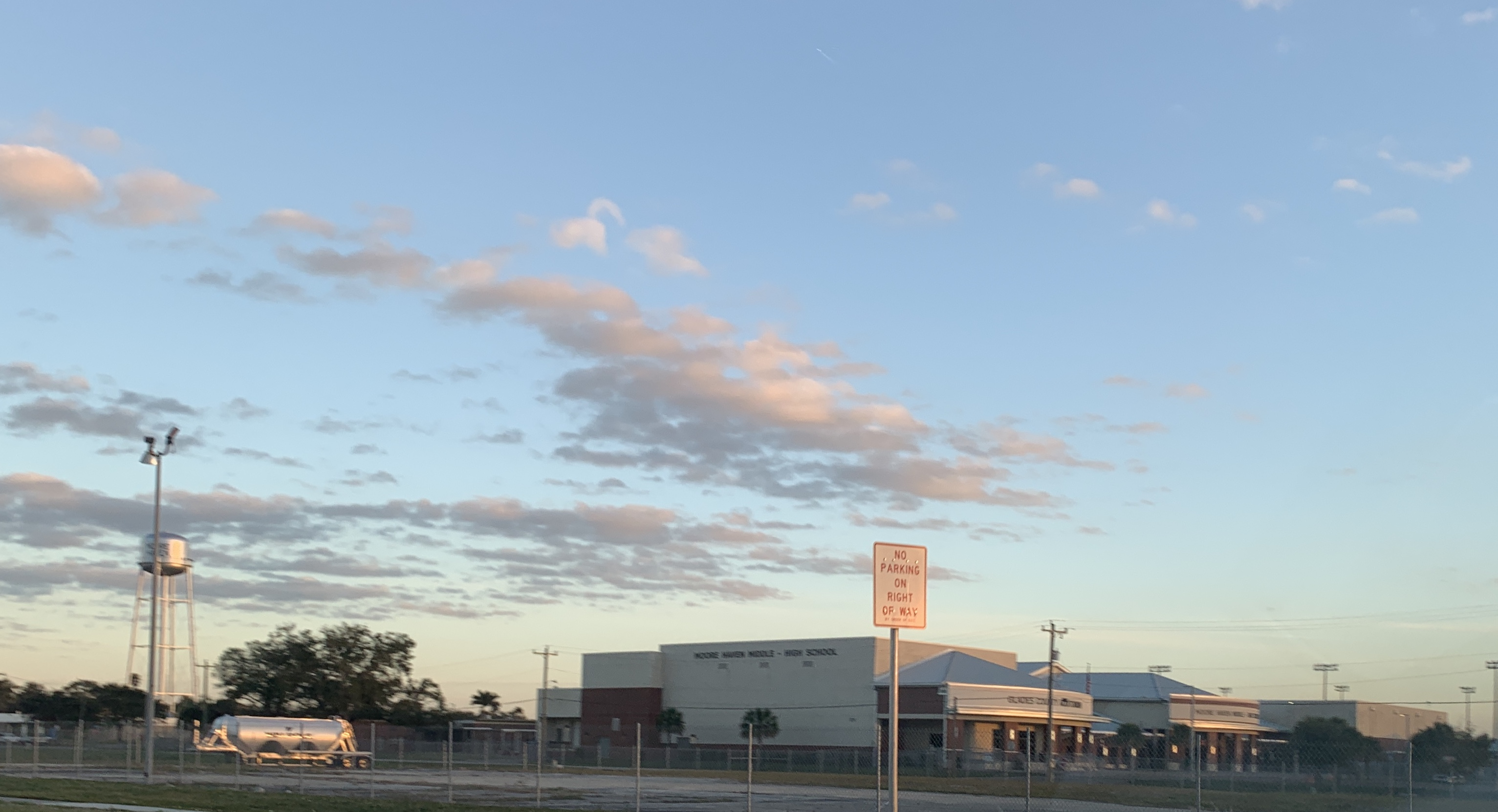

Location
- 700 Terrier Pride Drive S.W. Moore Haven, Florida; United States; 26°49′54″N 81°05′59″W

Information
- Type: Public
- Established: 1968
- School district: Glades County School District
- NCES School ID: 120066000864
- Principal: Dr. Matthew Roy
- Staff: 26.00 (on an FTE basis)
- Grades: 6 to 12
- Enrollment: 495 (2023-2024)
- Student to teacher ratio: 19.04
- Colors: Black, gold and white
- Nickname: Terriers

Moore Haven Junior Senior High School is a public school in the Glades County of Moore Haven, Florida. It was established in 1968 when it was split off from a shared campus with the elementary school. The school is in a rural town on the southwestern shore of Lake Okeechobee and serves students from Muse; Ortona; Palmdale; Crescent Acres; Horseshoe Acres; Hendry Isles; North LaBelle; Lakeport; Buckhead Ridge; and the Brighton Seminole Indian Reservation. The campus includes an auditorium, a gymnasium, and a football field with six-lane track. Baseball and softball fields are located nearby. It was rated a C-school in 2011–2012.

Terriers are the school mascot.

== Notable alumni ==
- Austin Simmons, college football quarterback and baseball pitcher for the Ole Miss Rebels
