= Florida State Road 78 =

State highway in Florida, United States

State Road 78
- SR 78 highlighted in red. CR 78 highlighted in blue.

Route information
- Maintained by FDOT
- Length: 72.017 mi (115.900 km)

Section 1
- Length: 19 mi (31 km)
- West end: CR 765 / CR 884 in Cape Coral
- East end: SR 31 near Fort Myers Shores

Section 2
- Length: 15 mi (24 km)
- West end: SR 29 near LaBelle
- East end: US 27 near Moore Haven

Section 3
- Length: 34 mi (55 km)
- South end: US 27 near Moore Haven
- North end: US 98 / US 441 in Okeechobee

Location
- Country: United States
- State: Florida
- Counties: Lee, Hendry, Glades, Okeechobee

Highway system
- Florida State Highway System; Interstate; US; State; Former; Pre‑1945; Toll; Scenic
← SR 77	→ SR 79

State Road 78 (SR 78) is the Florida Department of Transportation designation of the highway that historically extended from Pine Island Center on the Gulf Coast of Florida to the northern tip of Lake Okeechobee. In the 1980s, two segments of the route (including a segment in Lee County and a separate segment spanning Lee and Hendry counties) were removed from state maintenance to county maintenance and both were redesignated County Road 78 (CR 78). All three sections of SR 78 are signed east–west, even though the easternmost section is actually a north–south route.

== Route description ==
=== Western section ===
The historic western terminus of SR 78 is located on Pine Island at Stringfellow Road (CR 767) in Pine Island Center. From here, the route runs east as CR 78 and it is locally known as Pine Island Road. It crosses the Pine Island Causeway on to the main land in Cape Coral. Less than two miles after entering Cape Coral, CR 78 intersects with Burnt Store Road (CR 765) and Veterans Parkway (CR 884). The western segment of SR 78 begins at this intersection.

The western segment of SR 78 proceeds east-northeast through Cape Coral and North Fort Myers, where it intersects U.S. Route 41. SR 78 becomes Bayshore Road in North Fort Myers at its intersection with U.S. Route 41 Business (which is part of an earlier alignment of US 41 and the Tamiami Trail). Bayshore Road continues east paralleling the north shore of the Caloosahatchee River. It intersects with Interstate 75 shortly before terminating at SR 31 near the Lee County Civic Center.

At SR 31, another section of CR 78 begins less than 2 miles to the north. This segment, known as North River Road runs east along the north side of the Caloosahatchee River to Alva, and North LaBelle.

=== Central section ===
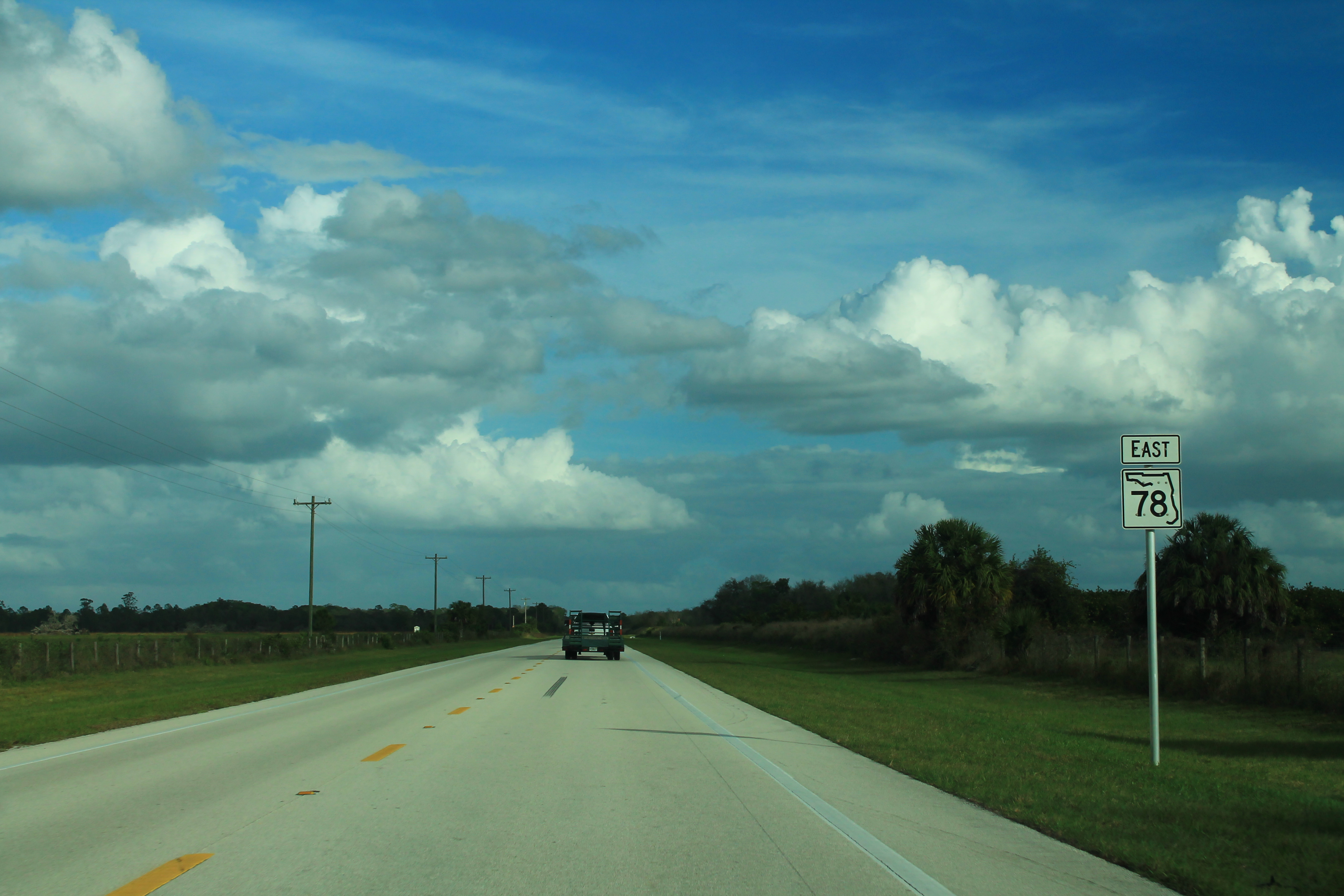
SR 78 between La Belle and Moore Haven.

The 14-mile-long central east–west section of SR 78 extends from SR 29 four miles (6 km) northeast of North LaBelle to an intersection with US 27/SR 25 midway between Citrus Center and Moore Haven. In between is the town of Ortona. The central section of SR 78 is entirely within a part of Glades County dedicated to the growth of foliage house plants.

SR 78 then runs concurrently with US 27 east 4 miles to the eastern section (though this concurrency is signed sparingly).

=== Okeechobee (eastern) section ===
The 34-mile-long easternmost section of SR 78 is signed east–west, even though the bulk of the road is north–south. This stretch follows the western and northern edge of the Lake Okeechobee wetlands. The southern (“western”) terminus of this segment is an intersection with US 27/SR 25 near Moore Haven. Motorists driving “east” (actually north) on SR 78, travel through Sportsman Village before visiting the Brighton Seminole Indian Reservation and Buckhead Ridge before reaching the northern (“eastern”) terminus, an intersection with US 98 (SR 700)-US 441 (SR 15) near Eagle Bay in the northern tip of Lake Okeechobee, roughly three miles to the south of Okeechobee.

== History ==
SR 78 was made up of a number of former state roads that were added to the State Highway System in the 1930s. Some of these state roads were previously cattle trails and ox-wagon routes that dated back to the American Civil War. During the 1945 Florida State Road renumbering, the full route from Pine Island to Okeechobee was unified as a single route and designated SR 78. The route would also have brief concurrencies with SR 31 near Olga, SR 29 near LaBelle, and US 27 near Moore Haven. SR 31 originally crossed the Caloosahatchee River on a swing bridge in Olga and was concurrent with SR 78 from Olga for 3 miles west before turning north to Arcadia.

In the 1950s, much of SR 78 in North Fort Myers was rebuilt and straightened. In 1954, two miles of SR 78 from SR 31 west was rerouted with the new alignment running south from SR 31 toward the Caloosahatchee River (near the current location of the Lee Civic Center) then turning west. The original alignment then became Old Bayshore Road. In April 1959, SR 78 was realigned from Daughtry Creek to the Atlantic Coast Line Railroad crossing in North Fort Myers. The original alignment is now Samville Road.

In the late 1950s, SR 78 was realigned just northeast of LaBelle with a new segment connecting to SR 29 four miles north of LaBelle (and running concurrent with SR 29 from there to LaBelle). SR 78 previously ran along present-day Marshall Field Road east of LaBelle.

In 1960, SR 31 was changed to run concurrent with SR 78 from North River Road south to the newly-built Wilson Pigott Bridge which replaced SR 31's previous bridge in Olga.

In the late 1970s, FDOT started to put into motion a sequence of events that ultimately resulted in the removal of dozens of miles of roadway from the State maintenance list to county maintenance. Entire State Roads disappeared as their FDOT designations were replaced by County Road signage, while other State Roads had only parts become County Roads (usually with no change in the numbering). In the 1980s, two sections of SR 78 were transitioned to county maintenance:

- The westernmost six miles (from Pine Island Center to Cape Coral) of Pine Island Road became County Road 78. It runs from CR 767 (Stringfellow Road) on Pine Island east over the Matlacha Bridge onto the mainland in northwest Cape Coral, where it connect to SR 78.
- North River Road (22 miles of zigzagging road along the north bank of the Caloosahatchee River from SR 31 near Babcock Ranch to SR 29 near LaBelle) was also converted to County Road 78. Brief concurrencies with both SR 31 and SR 29 were also removed.

== Major intersections ==
County	Location	mi	km	Destinations	Notes
Lee	Pine Island Center	0.000	0.000	CR 767 (Stringfellow Road) – St. James, Bokeelia	Western terminus
Lee	Matlacha	3.500	5.633	Pine Island Causeway over Matlacha Pass	
Lee	Cape Coral	5.467	8.798	CR 765 north (Burnt Store Road) / CR 884 east (Veterans Parkway)	CR 78 becomes SR 78
Lee	Cape Coral	12.061	19.410	CR 867A (Del Prado Boulevard)	
Lee	Cape Coral	12.361	19.893	CR 78A east (Pondella Road)	Western terminus of CR 78A
Lee	North Fort Myers	14.741	23.723	US 41 (North Cleveland Avenue / SR 45)	
Lee	North Fort Myers	15.858	25.521	US 41 Bus. (North Tamiami Trail / SR 739) – Punta Gorda, Fort Myers	
Lee	Bayshore	21.12	33.99	I-75 (SR 93) – Tampa, Naples	Exit 143 (I-75)
Lee		24.404 0.00	39.274 0.00	SR 31 to SR 80	SR 78 becomes CR 78
Lee	Alva	10.20	16.42	Broadway Street	To SR 80
Hendry		18.30	29.45	Fort Denaud Bridge Way (CR 78A west)	
Hendry		23.50	37.82	CR Old 78 east to SR 29 south – LaBelle	Western terminus of CR Old 78
Glades		24.20 0.000	38.95 0.000	SR 29 – Palmdale, LaBelle	CR 78 becomes SR 78
Glades	Ortona	5.933	9.548	CR 78A south (Ortona Road)	Northern terminus of CR 78A
Glades		14.858	23.912	US 27 north (SR 25) – Palmdale	Western end of US 27/SR 25 concurrency
Glades		18.839	30.318	US 27 south (SR 25) – Moore Haven	Eastern end of US 27/SR 25 concurrency
Glades	Lakeport	28.589	46.010	CR 74 west (Old Lakeport Road)	Eastern terminus of CR 74
Glades		29.556	47.566	CR 721 north	
Glades		31.651	50.937	CR 721 south	
Glades		32.104	51.666	CR 721 north – Seminole Reservation	
Glades	Buckhead Ridge	45.967	73.977	CR 78B south (Access Road)	
Kissimmee River		48.36	77.83	Bridge	
Okeechobee		53.080	85.424	US 98 (SR 15) / US 441 (SR 700) – West Palm Beach, Okeechobee	Eastern terminus
1.000 mi = 1.609 km; 1.000 km = 0.621 mi: Concurrency terminus; Route transition

== Related roads ==
=== County Road 78A in Lee County ===
County Road 78A
- Location: Cape Coral-North Fort Myers
- Length: 3.6 mi (5.8 km)
- Existed: 1980–present

County Road 78A is a spur road off of State Road 78 between Cape Coral and North Fort Myers locally known as Pondella Road. It provides a quicker way for motorists traveling east on CR 78 to access Downtown Fort Myers. The road was known as SR 78A before 1980.

Pondella Road previously intersected SR 78 at the same intersection as Del Prado Boulevard (CR 867A), but was later realigned to its current intersection. The original alignment is now Old Pondella Road.

=== County Road 78A in Hendry County ===
County Road 78A in Hendry County is a short spur off of CR 78 near Fort Denaud. It runs south from CR 78 along Fort Denaud Bridge Way and crosses the historic Fort Denaud Bridge over the Caloosahatchee River. Once across the river, it follows Fort Denaud Road south to SR 80 between Alva and LaBelle. The route was previously designated SR 78A.

=== County Road 78A in Glades County ===
County Road 78A in Glades County is a short spur off of SR 78 near Ortona. It is known as Ortona Road and it runs south to Ortona, coming to an end near the Ortona Lock and Dam on the Caloosahatchee River.

=== County Road 78B in Glades County ===
County Road 78B in Glades County is a route that loops through the community of Buckhead Ridge. It runs along Access Road, Hunter Road, and Linda Road and was previously SR 78B.
