= Pine Island Causeway =

Bridge in Florida, United States of America

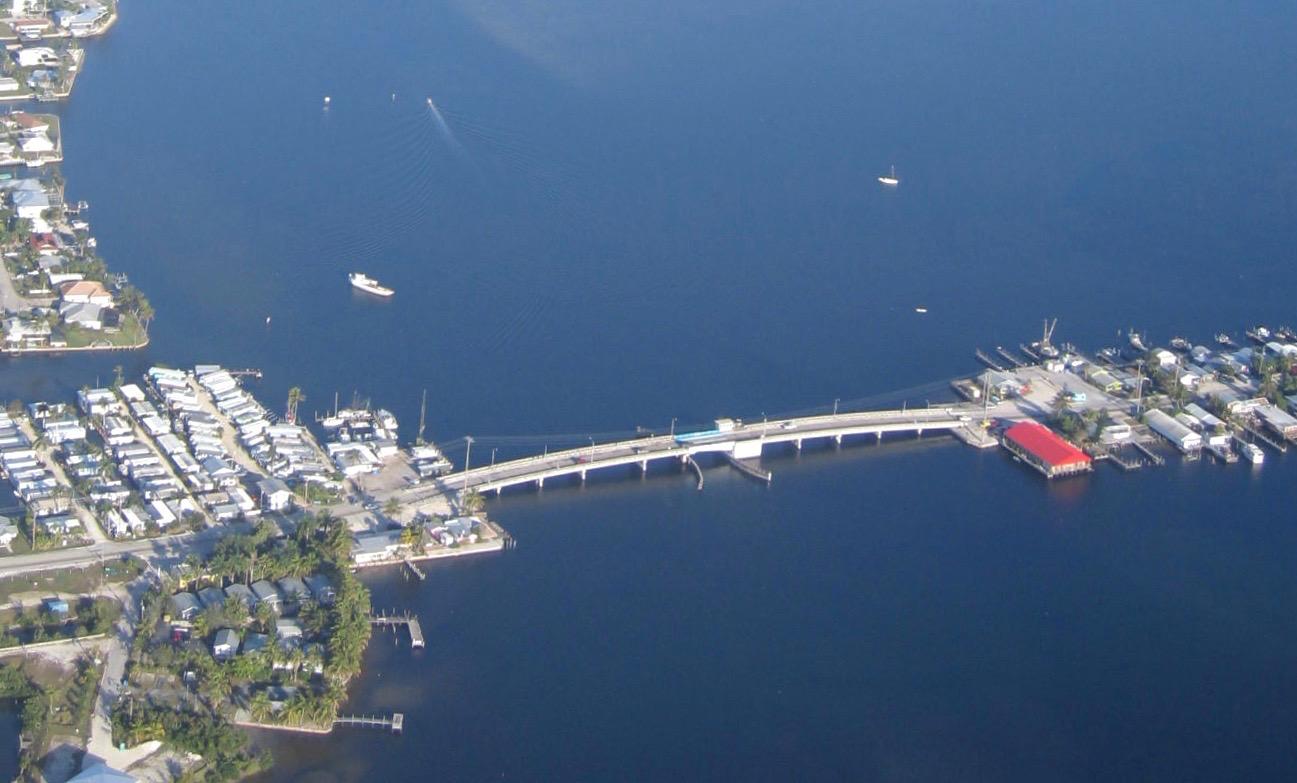
- Aerial view of the 1968–2012 Matlacha Pass Bridge
- Coordinates: 26°37′57.55″N 82°04′04.68″W
- Carries: CR 78 (Pine Island Road)
- Crosses: Matlacha Pass
- Locale: Matlacha, Florida
- Maintained by: Lee County Department of Transportation

Characteristics
- Design: 3 concrete bridges with 1 bascule span
- Clearance above: 9 ft (2.7 m) (with drawbridge lowered)

History
- Opened: Original crossing: 1927; 99 years ago Matlacha Pass Bridge: 1968; 58 years ago (second bridge); 2012; 14 years ago (current bridge); Porpoise Pass Canal Bridge: 1979; 47 years ago (current bridge); Little Pine Island Bridge: 1977; 49 years ago (second bridge); 2025; 1 year ago (current bridge)

Statistics
- Toll: None

Location
- Interactive map of Pine Island Causeway

The Pine Island Causeway is a roadway in Southwest Florida spanning Matlacha Pass connecting Pine Island, the largest island in Florida, to the main land in Cape Coral. The causeway carries Pine Island Road (CR 78) and consists of three bridges with dredged land sections in between them. The islands connected to the middle of the causeway are also home to the community of Matlacha (pronounced mat-la-SHAY). It provides the only vehicular access to both Matlacha and Pine Island.

== Route description ==
The Pine Island Causeway begins on the main land in Cape Coral. Heading west, the first bridge is the Matlacha Pass Bridge, a low level single-leaf bascule bridge. The causeway then enters the community of Matlacha on dredged land connected to Porpoise Point Island and West Island. The Porpoise Pass Canal Bridge on the causeway connects the two islands. The causeway then crosses the Little Pine Island Bridge, a low-level fixed-span bridge, to Pine Island.

== History ==
The Pine Island Causeway was first built in 1926 and opened for traffic in 1927. It was built largely in part to the influence of Pine Island resident Harry Stringfellow (for whom the nearby Stringfellow Road is named), who served as a county commissioner from 1926 to 1953. Before the causeway was built, Stringfellow would have to travel from his home in Pineland via a mule-drawn wagon south to St. James City to catch a steamboat to Fort Myers for county commission meetings. This process would often take all day one-way, meaning that Stringfellow was away from home for county commission meeting for days at a time. This led him to fight for the construction of the causeway to improve transportation to and on Pine Island.

When first built, the causeway originally consisted of wooden bridges with land dredged from oyster beds in between the bridges. The original Matlacha Pass Bridge included a swing span, which was a recycled span that had previously been used on the Alva Bridge over the Caloosahatchee River.

The roadway crossing the causeway was added to the state highway system in 1931 and the route was initially designated as State Road 183 (SR 183). SR 183 and a number of other roads became part of SR 78 during the 1945 Florida state road renumbering. The roadway was transferred to county control in the 1980s.

The original swing bridge over Matlacha Pass was replaced with a concrete bascule bridge in 1968. The bridge became a very popular fishing spot for local residents, and was nicknamed "The fishingest bridge in the world".

The original Little Pine Island Bridge was replaced with a concrete bridge in 1977. The Porpoise Pass Canal Bridge was replaced with its current concrete structure in 1979.

The current Matlacha Pass Bridge opened on November 18, 2012. After its demolition, the previous bridge (the one that operated from 1968 to 2012) was made into an artificial reef at Novak's reef, which is about 3 miles off the coast of Charlotte County.

=== Hurricane Ian ===
On September 28, 2022, the Pine Island Causeway was heavily damaged by the landfall of Hurricane Ian. The hurricane washed out the approaches to the bridges making them impassible, which greatly hindered rescue and recovery efforts on Pine Island. After completing temporary repairs, the causeway reopened for public use on October 5, 2022. The Florida Department of Transportation worked closely with Lee County on permanent repairs to the Pine Island Causeway, which included replacing the Little Pine Island Bridge. The first phase of the current Little Pine Island Bridge opened on April 4, 2025. The rest of the Little Pine Island Bridge was completed in March 2026 since the previous bridge needed to be removed to make room for it.
