= Ortona, Florida =

Unincorporated community in Florida, United States

Coordinates: 26°48′47″N 81°18′56″W

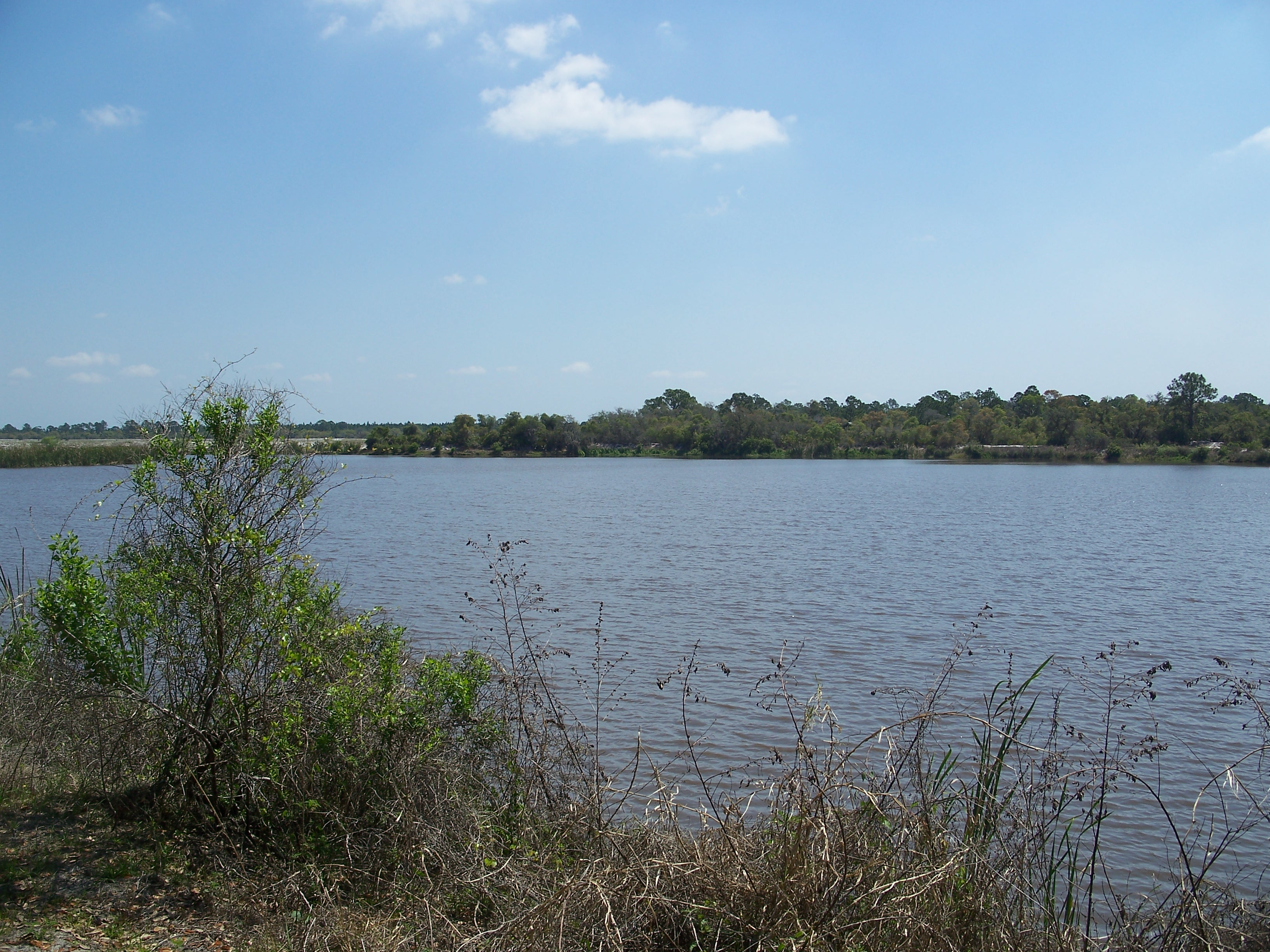
Lake Wobegon at Indian Mound Park, Ortona, Florida

Ortona is an unincorporated area and a populated place in Glades County, Florida.

One of the area's attractions is the Ortona Indian Mound Park, which preserves part of the Ortona Prehistoric Village, and the hiking trail through that area. The prehistoric mounds, canoe canals and earthworks were constructed by Native Americans across a five-square-mile region along the north side of the Caloosahatchee River. The site is located on SR 78, north of LaBelle.

== History ==
A LaBelle investor and businessman, Jerome G. Attanasio, bought 360 acres of land southwest of Citrus Center. He named the subdivision "Ortona" after the coastal town in Italy, where he was born. Hoping to attract grape growers to his development, Attanasio reported to the Moore Haven Times, in 1924, that he was impressed with the growth of 500 rootstock Carmen Grape on his six acres of land.

The original settlers were "squatters who moved in and out. Members of the Townsend family visited, stayed awhile, then moved on."

After the Depression, all land developers left except Williams, Storter, Hicks, Komer, and Rivers families.

Afterward, settlers moved into Ortona, along the Caloosahatchee River, living in "houses built of cane poles and roofed over with cabbage fan palms," buying five to ten acre tracts of land. Lonnie Williams, with other members of the community, went to Fisheating Creek to collect cane poles to build the Ortona Holiness Church, featuring a "cabbage fan roof." The palm frond roofs lasted up to three years. The community helped each other build their homes.

The settlers lived in a "cluster," fishing, hunting and farming, together. Everyone had access to sugarcane. Though all neighbors helped each other grind sugarcane for syrup; "everyone had a stand of cane," all supplies and tools had to be bought.

Tom and Amanda Williams, grandparents of Vance Storter, brought him to Ortona from Naples at four-years-old. They traveled from Naples to Fort Center after their daughter died of typhoid fever. With hogs bought from the Seminole, they finally moved to Ortona.

The first Ortona school was located by the O'Bannion's saw mill, according to Storter. A larger school was built by the county on two-acres of land "behind Mr. Komer's house to accommodate the increased enrollment."

Teachers were known for "leaving abruptly," according to Marvin Williams, "one with a nervous breakdown." The first consistent teacher was "Mr. Ketring" who "kept the boys at their school work." Focusing on school work was hard for the local students; "with plenty of hunting, fishing and chores, it was difficult to be very concerned about book learning."

Steamboats from Fort Myers came to load "cordwood" supplied by the J.F. "Bud" Cross family after contracting and cutting down woodland areas and delivering the wood to the boats.

Nailed to a tree was a coffee mill, accessible to everyone to grind their coffee beans. Afterward, the area was named Coffee Mill Hammock, including a road by the same name.

Without local fencing laws in the 1920s, cows grazed freely and dairy products were free, "if one had the determination and a drawdy pole."

"The drawdy pole was long with a loop of rope firmly attached to the end. The loop was hooked around the cow's horns, and the pole twisted to tighten the grip of the horns. Finally, the cow could only move in a slight semi-circle, and it could be milked."

There was no supplemental feed; the cows were free-range. Fourteen to twenty cows provided enough milk for a family. There was "sweet milk for drinking, sour milk for bread, butter, and other milk by-products."

Hogs were raised and sold to the locals and hauled to Fort Myers. "At that time, the cattle were too scrawny to be slaughtered, and the price wasn't nearly as good as for hogs."

Thirty-two acres of land was used for the Ortona Cemetery in 1921. The first caretaker was Clive Hicks.

A train depot was built after Chihi, a railroad crossing, was finished. The first bridge tender at the railroad was Eugene Walker, who "bought the cane mill from an outlaw for $112" and was still the owner in 1985. The depot was used as a refuge for flooding for those in lower areas around Ortona's ridge.

Owned by Don Melcer, Meadowlark Campground featured a two-story building, with workers living near the camp. Currently, it's called the Meadowlark Shores 55+ RV Park.

Ken Bracken started the River Oaks subdivision located west of Meadowlark Shores.

Turkey Creek was created by Eurgene Walker, the location of O'Bannion's saw mill, which kept a dragline onsite; "a horse couldn't get through the thick brush, but the dragline dug through."

In 1985, Ghands and Baker owned one sandmine while one was leased to E.R. Jahna, though operated by John Bruner. Paul and Wheeler planted 1,000 acres of young citrus groves in 1979.

At the same time, Ortona featured a beauty shop, store and bar for locals and "enthusiastic winter visitors."

== Climate ==
Climate data for Ortona, Florida, 1991–2020 normals, extremes 2002–2024
Month	Jan	Feb	Mar	Apr	May	Jun	Jul	Aug	Sep	Oct	Nov	Dec	Year
Record high °F (°C)	88 (31)	91 (33)	93 (34)	98 (37)	101 (38)	100 (38)	98 (37)	98 (37)	96 (36)	95 (35)	93 (34)	89 (32)	101 (38)
Mean maximum °F (°C)	85.8 (29.9)	87.2 (30.7)	88.9 (31.6)	92.7 (33.7)	94.2 (34.6)	96.0 (35.6)	95.5 (35.3)	95.6 (35.3)	94.4 (34.7)	92.6 (33.7)	88.5 (31.4)	86.2 (30.1)	96.8 (36.0)
Mean daily maximum °F (°C)	74.2 (23.4)	77.9 (25.5)	80.4 (26.9)	84.9 (29.4)	88.2 (31.2)	90.1 (32.3)	90.9 (32.7)	91.6 (33.1)	89.5 (31.9)	85.8 (29.9)	80.1 (26.7)	76.7 (24.8)	84.2 (29.0)
Daily mean °F (°C)	61.7 (16.5)	64.7 (18.2)	67.5 (19.7)	72.3 (22.4)	76.5 (24.7)	80.0 (26.7)	81.4 (27.4)	82.1 (27.8)	80.4 (26.9)	75.9 (24.4)	69.1 (20.6)	64.6 (18.1)	73.0 (22.8)
Mean daily minimum °F (°C)	49.2 (9.6)	51.5 (10.8)	54.6 (12.6)	59.8 (15.4)	64.7 (18.2)	70.0 (21.1)	72.0 (22.2)	72.5 (22.5)	71.4 (21.9)	66.0 (18.9)	58.2 (14.6)	52.6 (11.4)	61.9 (16.6)
Mean minimum °F (°C)	32.1 (0.1)	35.7 (2.1)	39.5 (4.2)	47.9 (8.8)	56.7 (13.7)	66.2 (19.0)	68.3 (20.2)	69.9 (21.1)	67.5 (19.7)	53.1 (11.7)	42.8 (6.0)	39.0 (3.9)	30.3 (−0.9)
Record low °F (°C)	25 (−4)	26 (−3)	32 (0)	42 (6)	51 (11)	60 (16)	61 (16)	67 (19)	62 (17)	40 (4)	37 (3)	26 (−3)	25 (−4)
Average precipitation inches (mm)	2.21 (56)	1.92 (49)	2.83 (72)	3.06 (78)	4.62 (117)	10.31 (262)	9.04 (230)	9.15 (232)	7.47 (190)	3.34 (85)	1.34 (34)	1.77 (45)	57.06 (1,449)
Average precipitation days (≥ 0.01 in)	5.6	5.7	5.1	5.9	9.0	17.2	17.1	19.7	15.8	7.2	5.1	5.8	119.2
Source 1: NOAA
Source 2: National Weather Service (mean maxima/minima 2006–2020)

== Communities ==
Meadowlark Shores 55+ RV Park

River Oaks Subdivision

Turkey Creek

== Festivals ==
The Cane Grinding Festival is a fund-raiser originally for Ortona's volunteer fire department, with the firehouse being built by the community. "It commemorates the early settlers’ cultivation and processing of the delectable sugar cane syrup. The festival features bluegrass music, clogging, arts and crafts booths, and barbecue chicken and rib dinners. Proceeds from the festival benefit the local fire department."

== Gallery ==
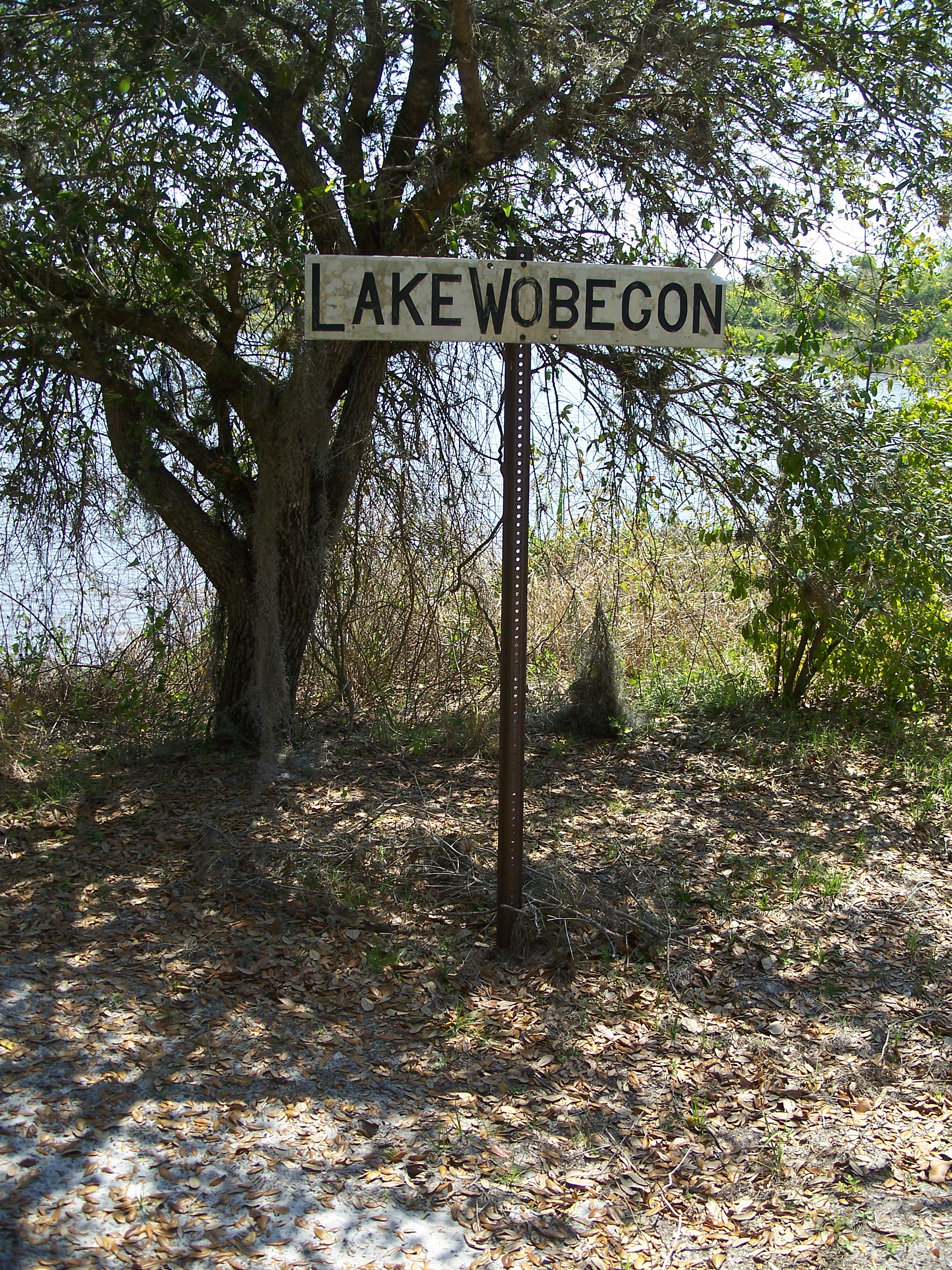
Lake Wobegon signage

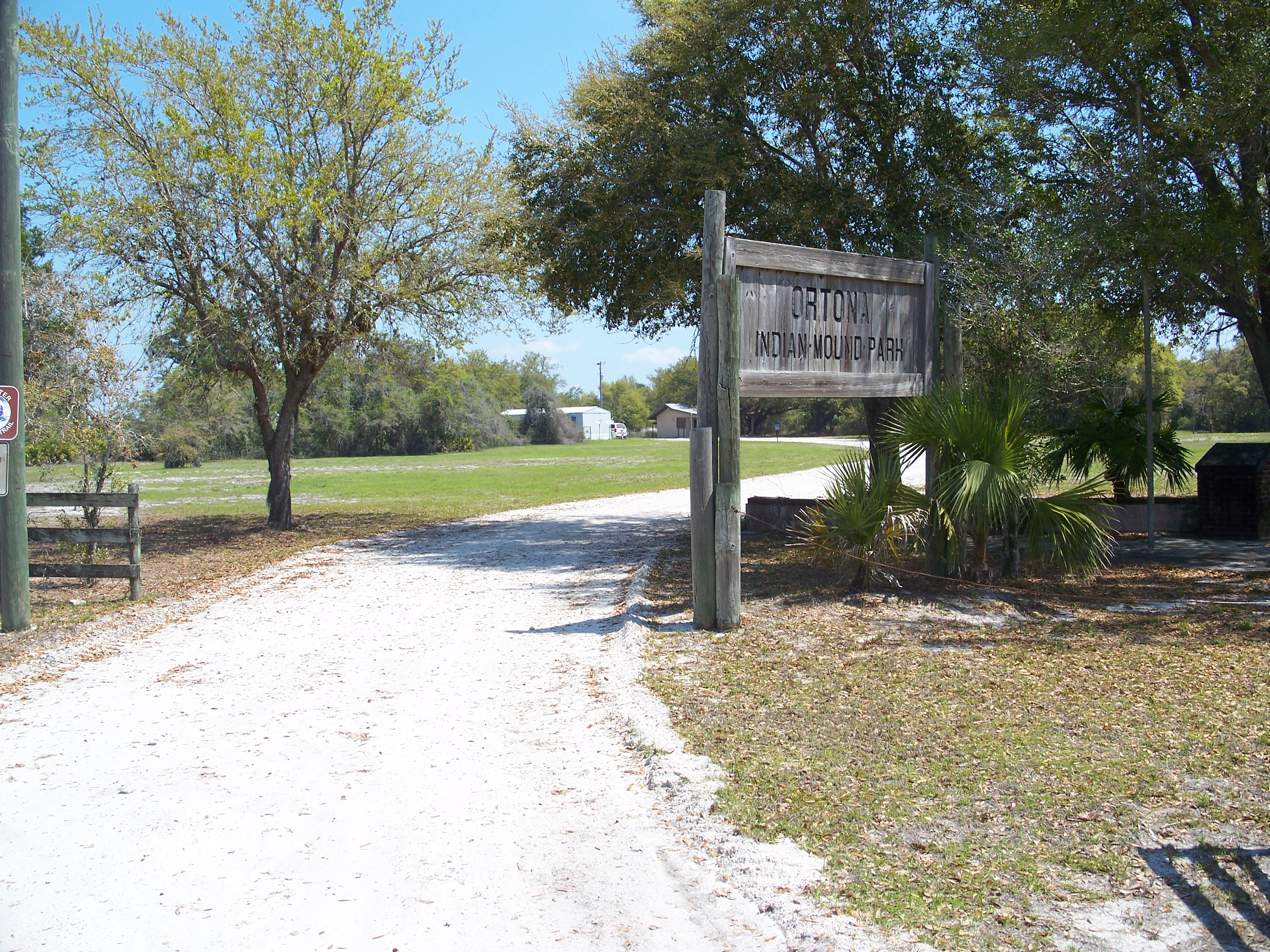
Ortona, Indian Mound Park entrance

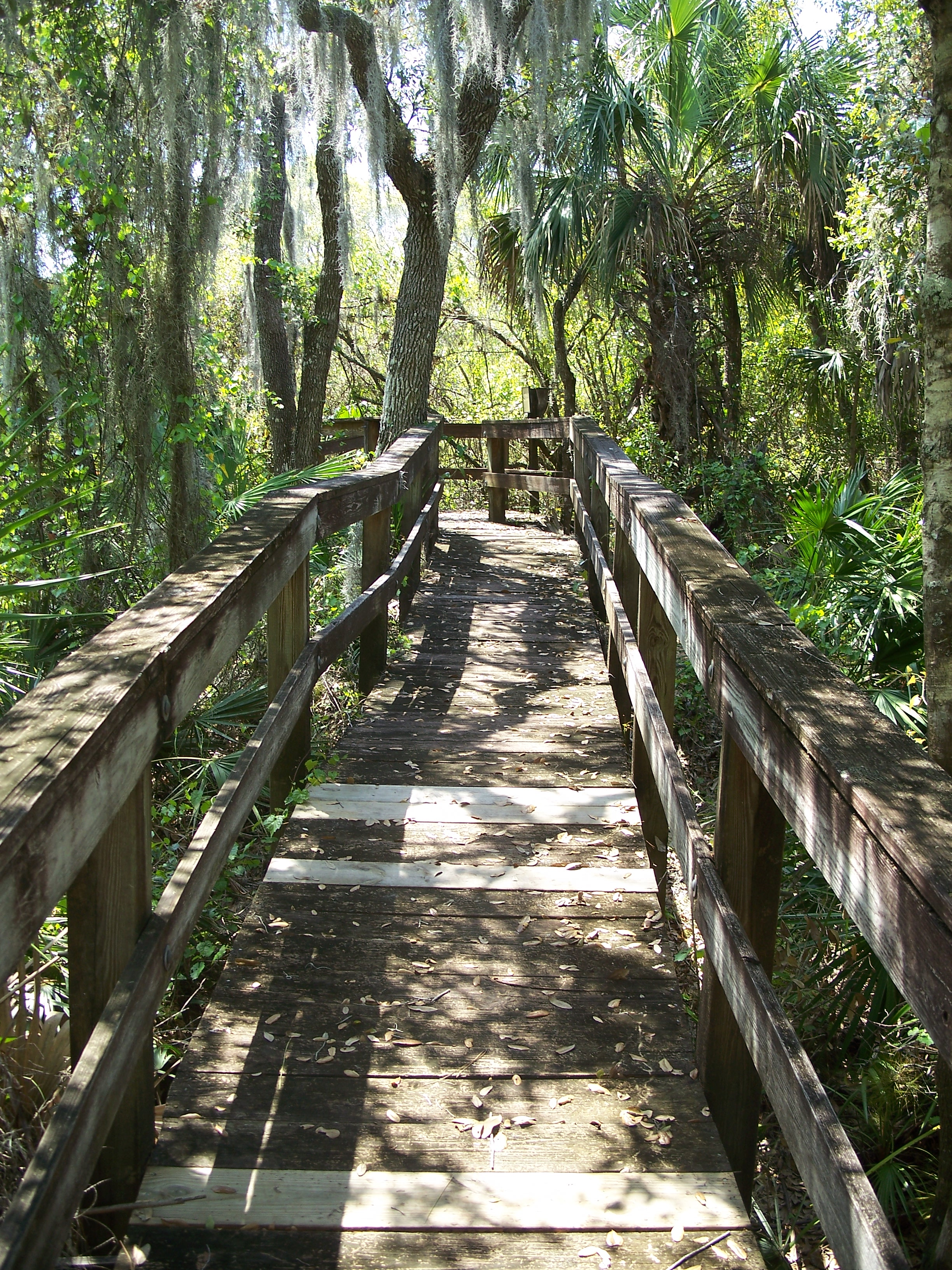
Indian Mound Park boardwalk

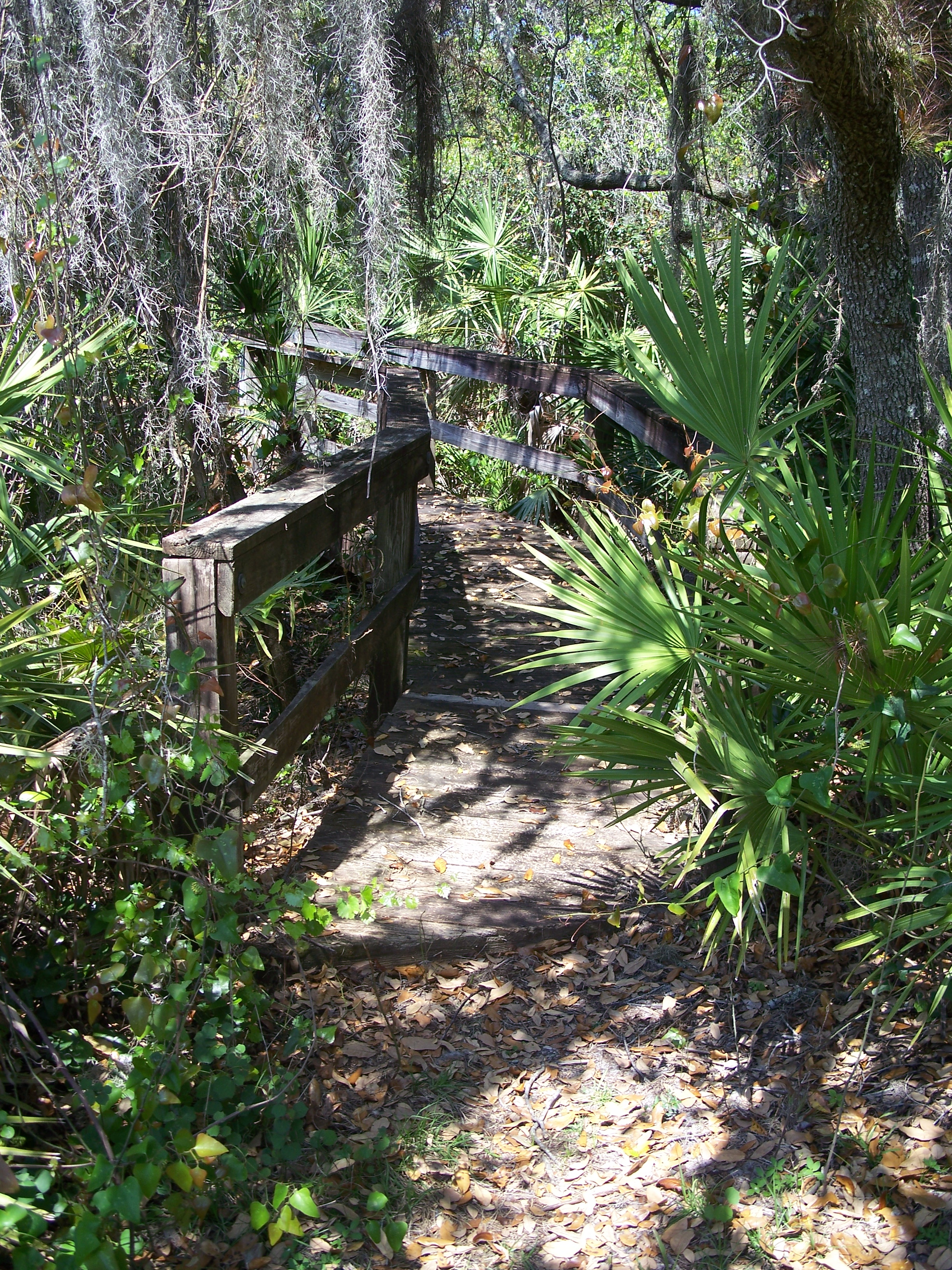
Indian Mound Park curving boardwalk

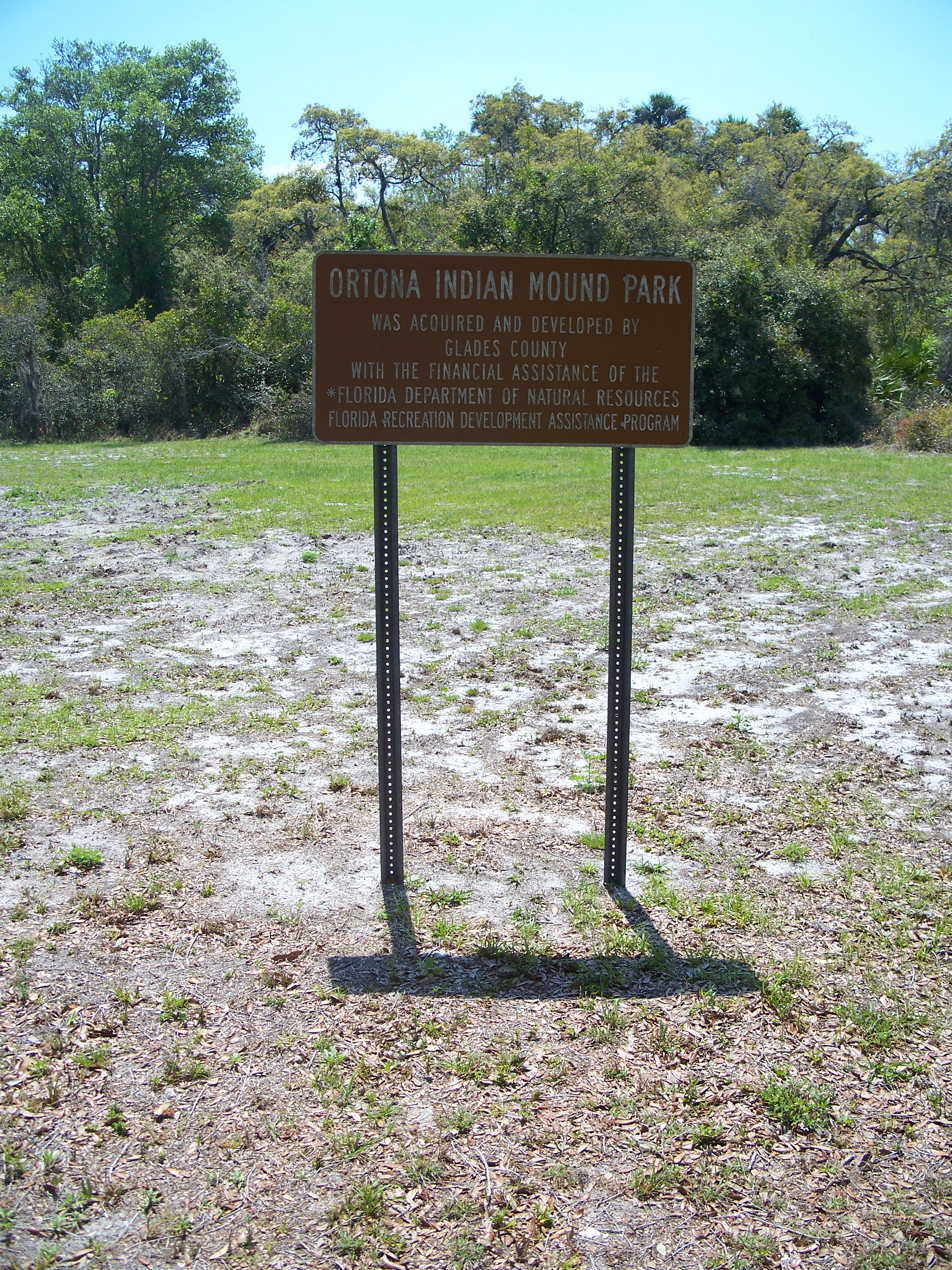
Ortona Indian Mound Park signage noting park was acquired and developed by Glades County, Florida with the assistance of the Florida Department of Natural Resources and the Florida Recreation Development Assistance Program

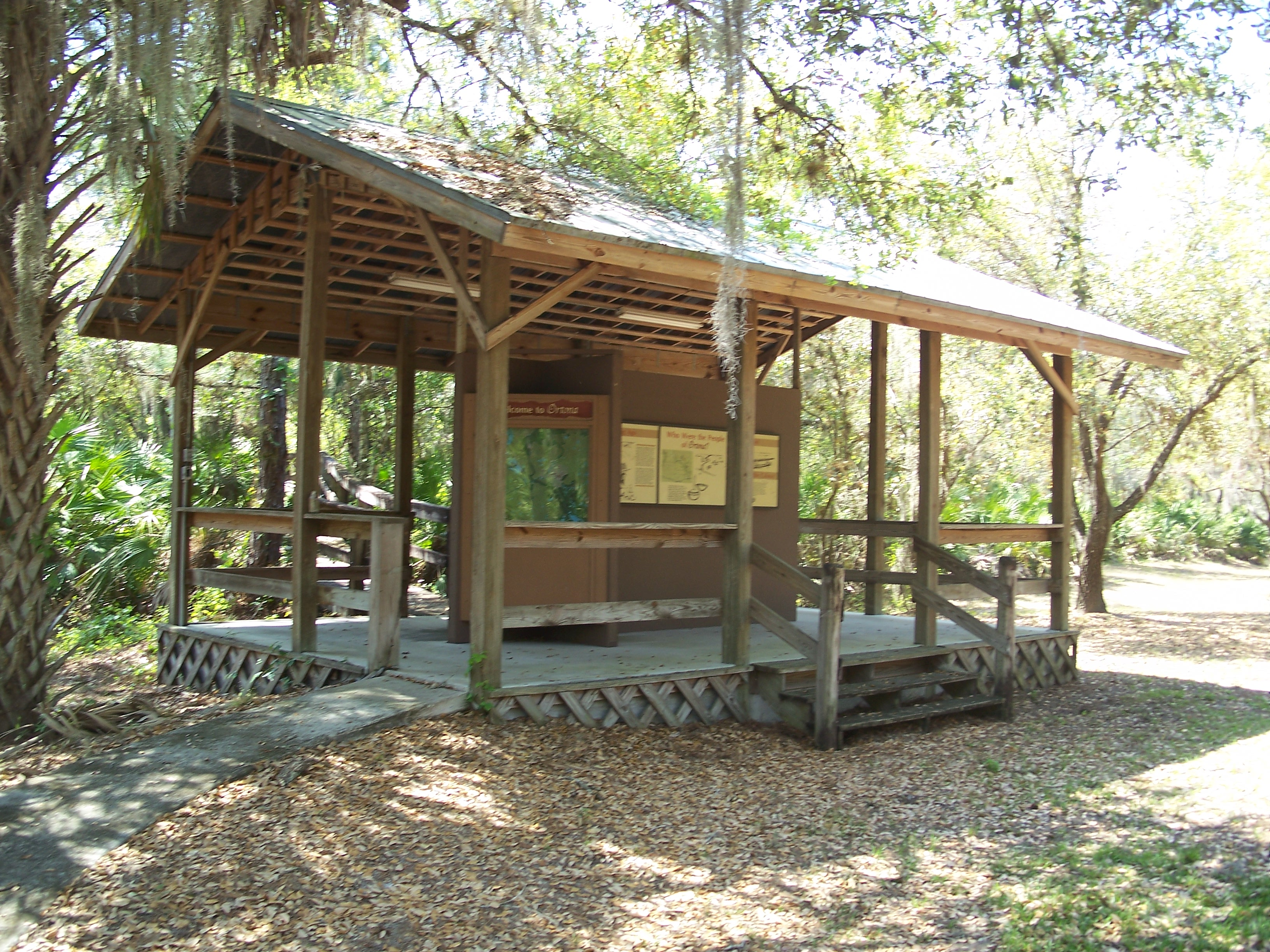
Indian Mound Park information kiosk

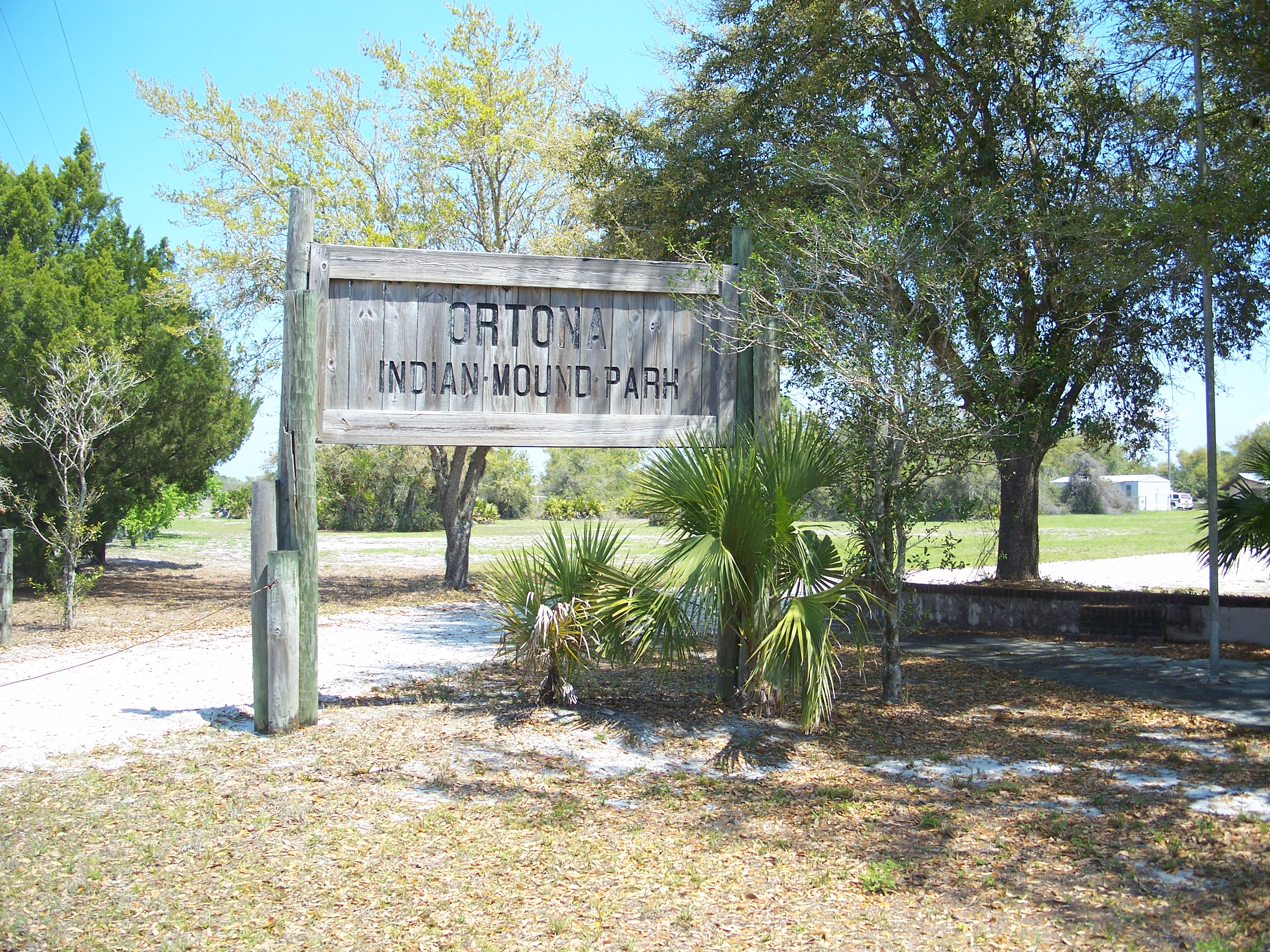
Ortona Indian Mound Park signage

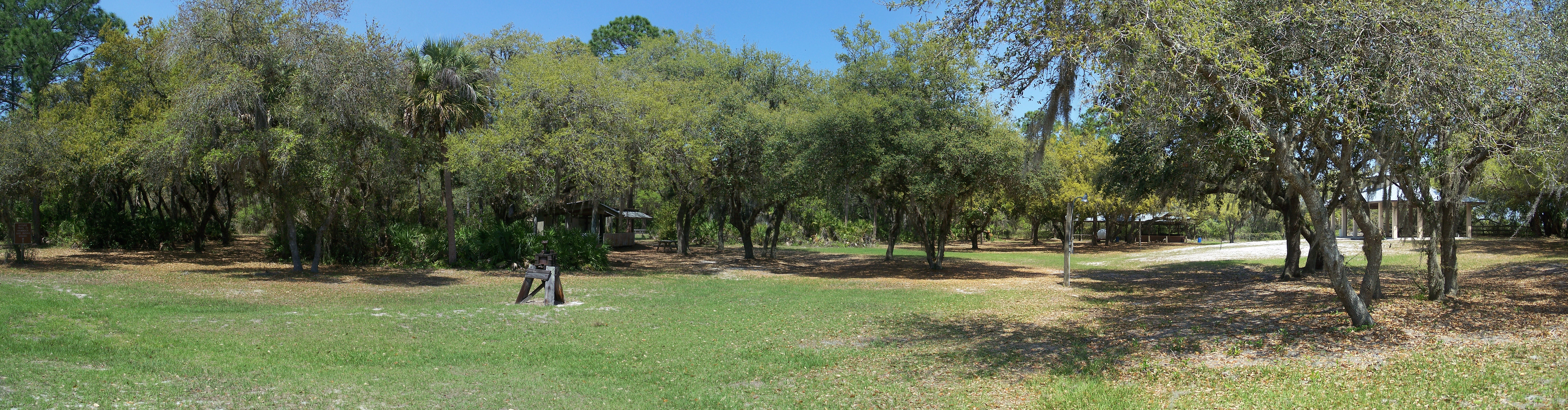
Panorama photograph of Ortona Indian Mound Park
