= Lake Okeechobee Scenic Trail =

Trail in Florida, United States

- Length: 109 mi (175 km)
- Location: Clewiston, Florida, United States
- Season: Year round
- Sights: Lake Okeechobee
- Hazards: Sunburn; Heat stroke Alligators; Pythons; Traffic
- Surface: Asphalt grass dirt concrete

The Lake Okeechobee Scenic Trail (LOST) is a 109-mile multi-use path around Lake Okeechobee, the seventh largest lake in the United States and the largest in the state of Florida. The trail began as the Okeechobee Segment of the Florida National Scenic Trail (FNST), a 1,000 mile trail that runs from Miami to Pensacola. The USDA and National Forest Service dedicated the Okeechobee Segment as part of the FNST in 1993. Most of the trail is atop the 35-feet tall Herbert Hoover Dike. The trail crosses five counties, Hendry, Glades, Okeechobee, Martin and Palm Beach. Many stretches run along state and county highways, including Florida State Road 78.

== Facilities ==
There are 13 camping areas around the trail, most of which have no water or sanitation facilities. While the trail circumnavigates the entire lake, there are portions in which the traveler must come down from the levee. In these areas, they may encounter heavy traffic and/or alligators. Because most of the trail runs atop a levee, there is very little shelter from the Florida sun, and running off the edge may result in a dangerous, rapid descent.

== Restrictions ==
Because the trail is administered by the federal government, firearms are prohibited. Groundfires are prohibited, pets must be kept on a leash, and all trash must be carried out.

== Closures ==
Because of the age of the dike and the instability of the terrain, there are frequent partial closures of the trail. A thirty-mile section from Mayaca to Canal Point is currently closed for renovation of the levee. Additionally, the portion of the trail running from Taylor Creek to Nubbin Slough section, the portion from Pahokee to Torry Island section, South Bay to Clewiston and Liberty Point to Lakeport section of the Lake Okeechobee Scenic Trail as well as a portion of the Florida National Scenic Trail are closed for extensive dike rehabilitation work. The US Army Corps of Engineers maintains the trail and posts information about trail conditions on their website.

== Access points ==
According to the Corps of Engineers, the following access points are available:

- Nubbin Slough 27.193°N 80.7639°W
- Belle Glade 26.7037°N 80.7134°W
- Fisheating Creek South 26.9231°N 81.1217°W
- Henry Creek 27.1631°N 80.716°W
- South Bay 26.683°N 80.7303°W
- Fisheating Creek North 26.9711°N 81.1175°W
- Chancy Bay 27.0905°N 80.6615°W
- John Stretch Park 26.6985°N 80.8079°W
- Bare Beach 27.0029°N 81.0522°W
- Port Mayaca North 26.7564°N 80.9173°W
- Clewiston East 26.9984°N 81.0677°W
- Harney Pond Canal 26.992°N 80.6219°W
- Port Mayaca South 26.9814°N 80.6169°W
- Clewiston West 26.762247°N 80.922811°W
- Indian Prairie Canal 27.0657°N 80.9781°W
- Canal Point 26.8685°N 80.6291°W
- Liberty Point 26.812°N 80.985°W
- Kissimmee River 27.1528°N 80.8666°W
- Pahokee 26.8251°N 80.6665°W
- Moore Haven East 26.8383°N 81.0822°W
- Okeechobee 27.1966°N 80.8308°W
- Rardin Park 26.7497°N 80.6836°W
- Moore Haven West 26.8416°N 81.0894°W

=== John Stretch Park ===
John H Stretch Memorial Park
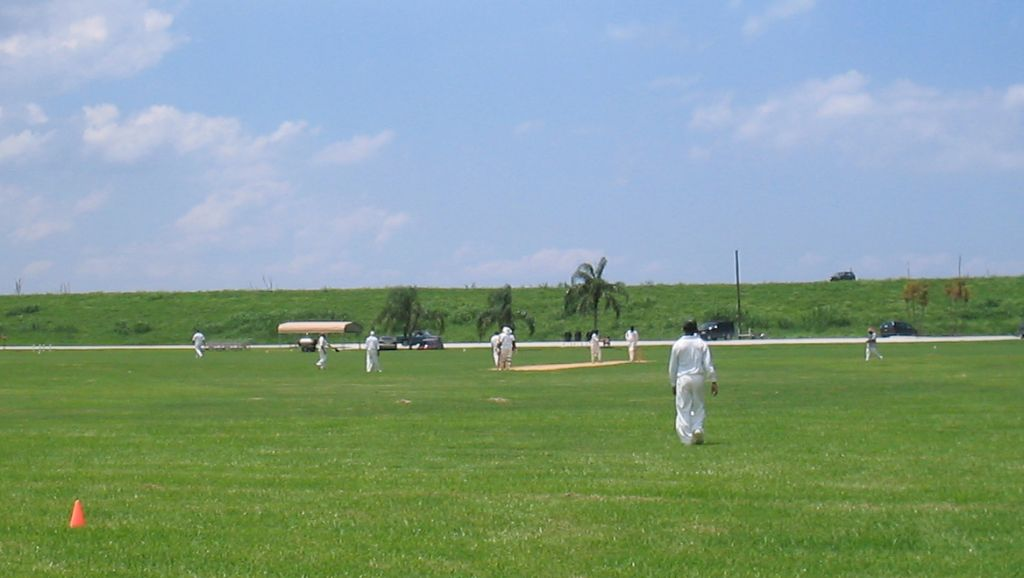
- Participants enjoy a game of cricket on the field at John Stretch Park
- Interactive map of John H Stretch Memorial Park
- Type: County park
- Location: 47225 US 27, Palm Beach County, Florida
- Nearest city: Lake Harbor, Florida
- Coordinates: 26.696606°N 80.808392°W

John Stretch Park is a small roadside park on the south side of Lake Okeechobee that allows access to the trail. The park is accessed along U.S. Route 27. The park provides picnic areas, restrooms, a large grassy field, an outdoor basketball court, and a boat ramp. Admission is not charged. The entire north edge of the park is dominated by the twenty-foot dike surrounding the lake. Set into this dike at one end of the park are flood control machinery and a lock for moving boats into and out of the lake.

This park also displays several diesel engines, valves, and pipes that once were part of the flood control facility.

The park is named in honor of John H. Stretch. A plaque in the park explains that Stretch worked as director of recreation and conservation for the flood control district between 1963 and 1970. In May 1970, Stretch was killed in a plane crash while working for the Florida Flood Control Agency.

In 2022, a man and a woman were shot to death in the park.

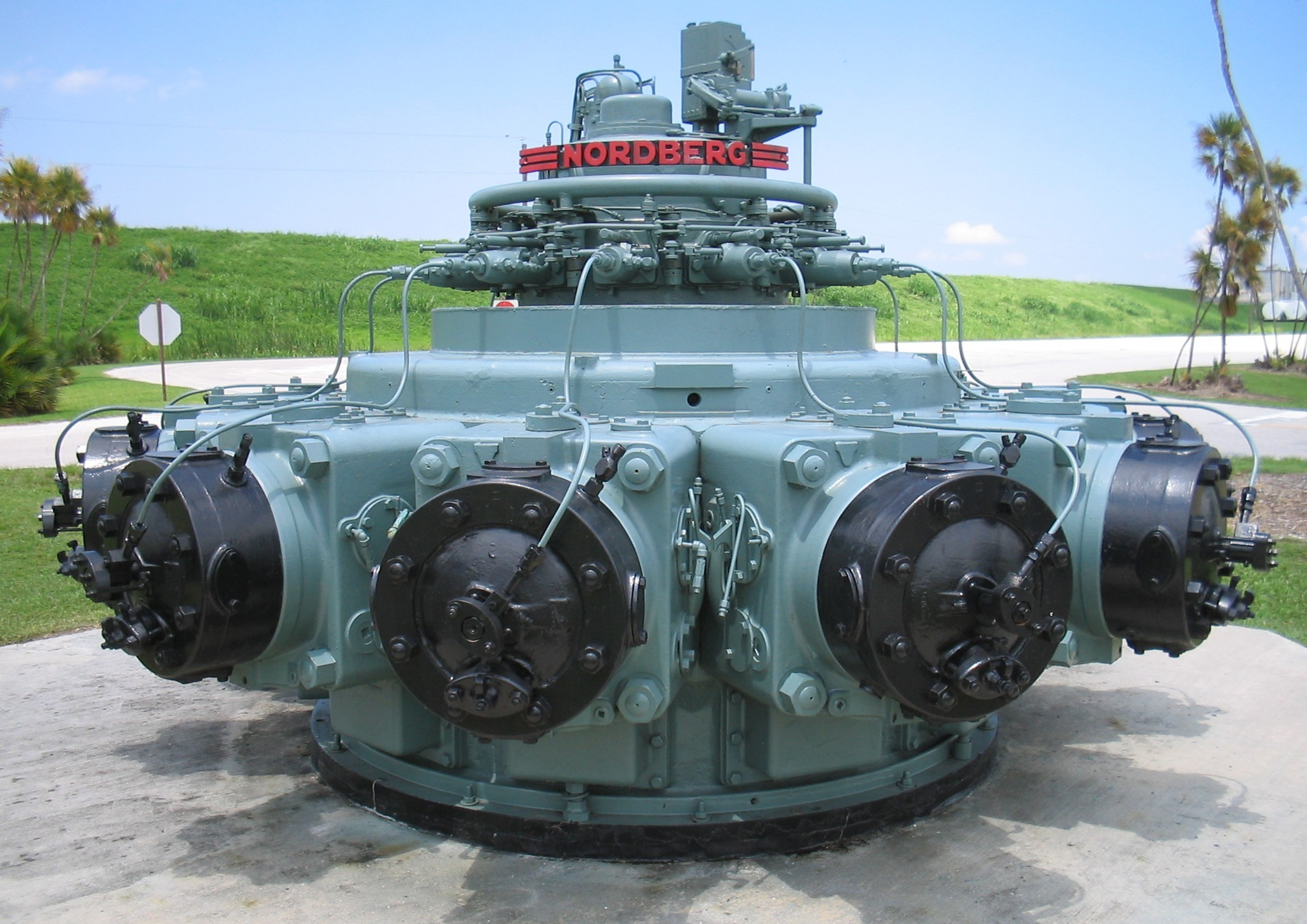
Flood control machinery on display
