= George Susce (pitcher) =

American baseball player (1931–2010)

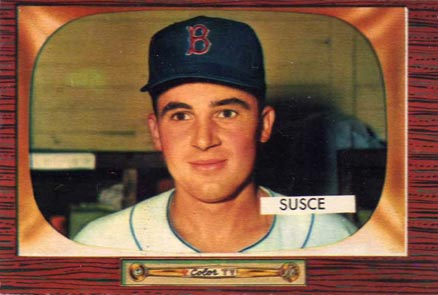
- Pitcher
- Born: September 13, 1931; Pittsburgh, Pennsylvania, U.S.
- Died: May 8, 2010 (aged 78); Matlacha, Florida, U.S.
- Batted: Right Threw: Right

MLB debut
- April 15, 1955, for the Boston Red Sox

Last MLB appearance
- May 6, 1959, for the Detroit Tigers

MLB statistics
- Win–loss record: 22–17
- Earned run average: 4.42
- Strikeouts: 177
- Stats at Baseball Reference

Teams
- Boston Red Sox (1955–1958); Detroit Tigers (1958–1959)

George Daniel Susce (September 13, 1931 – May 8, 2010) was an American pitcher in Major League Baseball.

== Biography ==
A right-handed pitcher and batter, the Pittsburgh, Pennsylvania, native stood 6 ft 1 in (185 cm) tall and weighed 180 pounds (82 kg). Also known as George Susce Jr., he was the son of George C. M. Susce, a former major league catcher and longtime coach with numerous teams.

The younger Susce pitched for five seasons (1955–59) in the American League for the Boston Red Sox and Detroit Tigers. His rookie 1955 campaign for Boston was his finest. On July 20, he threw a complete-game, one-hit shutout against the Kansas City Athletics, with Vic Power getting the only base hit against him in the first inning. Ironically, Susce's father was on the Athletics' coaching staff at the time and that was the first major league game he had ever seen his son pitch. That season, Susce appeared in 29 games, starting 15, and compiled a 9–7 record with six complete games and an earned run average of 3.06.

Overall, he won twenty-two games, lost seventeen, and compiled an ERA of 4.42 in 117 major league games, largely as a relief pitcher.

Susce remained in the Boston area after his playing career ended, and was a longtime resident of Needham, Massachusetts, until he retired to his winter home in Florida, where he died at the age of seventy-eight in Matlacha, Florida.

== See also ==
- List of second-generation Major League Baseball players
