= Fisheating Creek =

Creek in Florida, United States

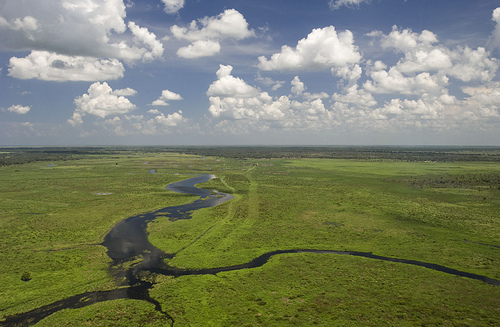
- Aerial view

Location
- Country: United States
- State: Florida

Physical characteristics
- Source
  - coordinates: 27°19′58″N 81°32′19″W
- Mouth
  - location: Fisheating Bay, Lake Okeechobee
  - coordinates: 26°58′15″N 81°06′02″W
  - elevation: 2 m (6 ft 7 in)

Fisheating Creek is a stream that flows into Lake Okeechobee in Florida. It is the only remaining free-flowing water course feeding into the lake, and the second-largest natural source for the lake. Most of the land surrounding the stream is either publicly owned or under conservation easements restricting development. The lower part of the stream remains in a largely natural state, and efforts are underway to restore the upper part of the stream to a more natural state.

== Description ==
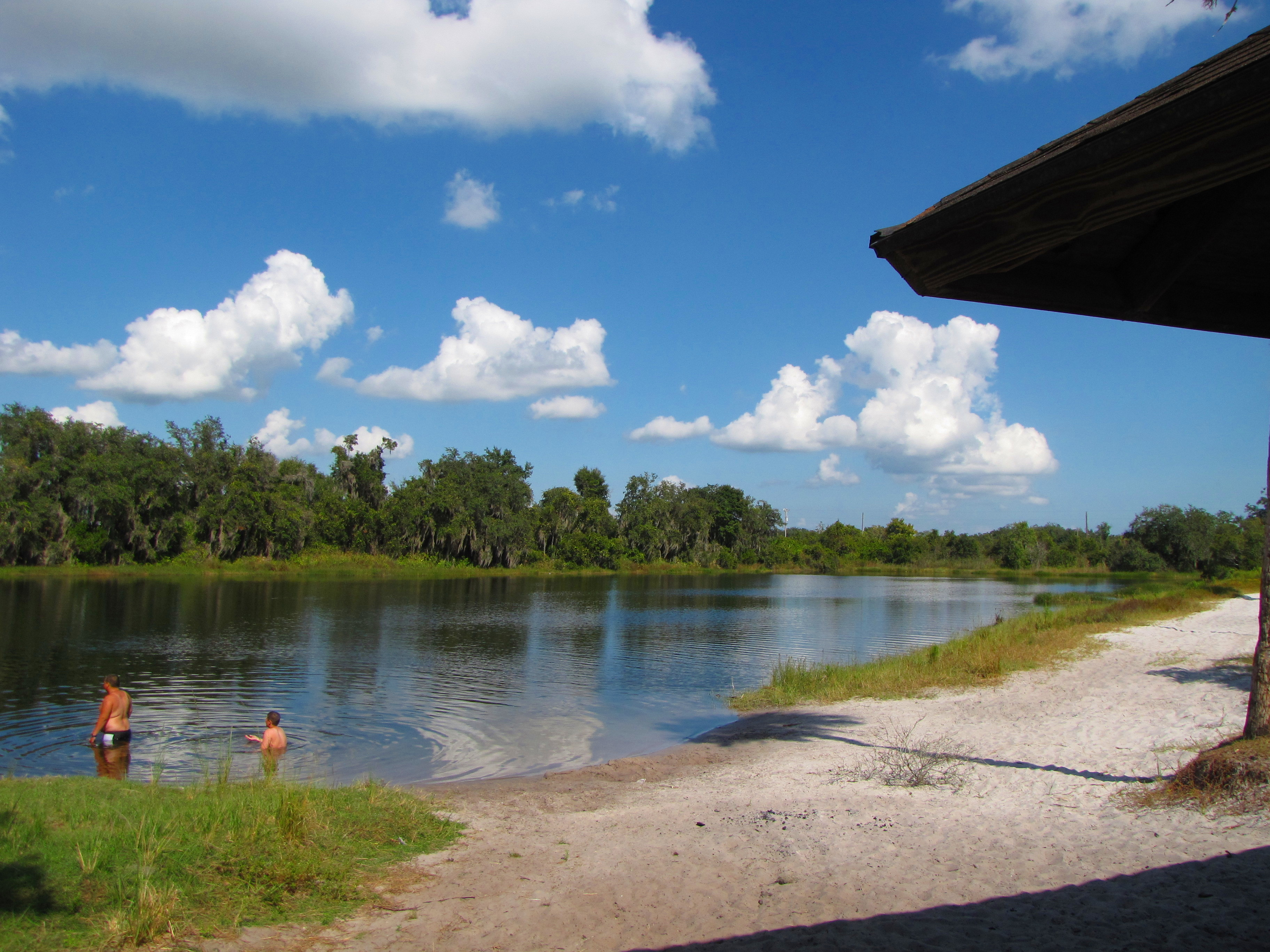
A swimming hole

The name Fisheating Creek is derived from the Seminole name for the stream recorded on a military map of 1839, Thlothlopopka-Hatchee, which is translated as "the river where fish are eaten". Fisheating Creek is between 40 miles (64 km) and 51 miles (82 km) long. It flows southward through an area called the Cypress Swamp in the southwestern part of Highlands County and into Glades County, where it turns eastward about 1 mile (1.6 km) north of County Road 731 and flows about 30 miles (48 km) to Lake Okeechobee. The stream spreads out into Cowbone Marsh for the last 8 miles (13 km) before entering the lake. Fisheating Creek is the second-largest natural source of water for Lake Okeechobee (behind the Kissimmee River), supplying close to 9% of the water flowing into the lake.

Fisheating Creek originally arose in a series of perennial marshes in Highlands County west of Lake Placid. Each marsh overflowed into another, slightly lower marsh until Fisheating Creek emerged. In the 20th century ditches and a canal drained the marshes, which were converted into agricultural land. In 2010 the United States Department of Agriculture purchased a conservation easement on 26,000 acres (110 km^{2}) in Highlands County south of State Road 70, and plans to restore the land in the easement area to marshes.

Fisheating Creek flows through a landscape of prairies, both dry and wet, flatwoods, freshwater marshes, hammocks, bottomland forests, and floodplain swamps. Human activity has introduced improved pastures, and eucalyptus and pine plantations. In 1842 Fisheating Creek was described as a large stream in the dry season, varying in width from a river to a brook, and very "tortuous". Lake Okeechobee has been artificially maintained at a lower level than prevailed before the 20th century, with the result that much of Cowbone Marsh has been drained and converted to agricultural land. Lake Okeechobee has been almost completely enclosed by the Herbert Hoover Dike. The only gap in the dike is at Fisheating Creek, where the dike turns inland and parallels the stream on both sides for several miles, leaving Fisheating Creek as the only remaining free-flowing tributary of Lake Okeechobee. The Lake Okeechobee Scenic Trail runs across the Herbert Hoover Dike.

The stream lies almost entirely within the Fisheating Creek Wildlife Management Area. The only populated places near Fisheating Creek are the small communities of Palmdale, near where U.S. Route 27 crosses the stream, and Lakeport, near the mouth of the stream on Lake Okeechobee. Twenty-seven rare species live in the Fisheating Creek watershed. Preservation of the Fisheating Creek ecosystem is considered critical to the long-term welfare of Florida panthers, black bears, swallow-tailed kites, whooping cranes, sandhill cranes, crested caracaras and other species

== History ==
The area around Fisheating Creek was occupied by people of the Belle Glade culture from as early as 1000 BCE. There are many archaeological sites from that period in the area, the best known of which is Fort Center, which was occupied from before 450 BCE until about 1700.

"Fort Center", a palisade of cabbage-palm trunks named for United States Army Lieutenant J. P. Center, was built on the banks of Fisheating Creek during the Second Seminole War (1835–1843) (the archaeological site is named after the Seminole War fort). In 1842, a reconnaissance party of 83 sailors and marines (along with a Seminole guide and his wife and child) led by United States Navy Lieutenant John Rodgers traveled in 16 dugout canoes from Key Biscayne through the Everglades, across Lake Okeechobee and up both the Kissimmee River to Lake Tohopekaliga, and Fisheating Creek to the head of the open stream, before returning to Key Biscayne. Fort Center had been abandoned by then, and the expedition had to repair the palisade when they occupied it for a few days. The expedition found evidence that Seminoles had been living in the area of Fisheating Creek, but did not encounter any in the course of the 60-day expedition. Fort Center was reactivated during the Third Seminole War (1853–55) as a station on a military road from Fort Myers to Fort Jupiter, with part of the route using canoes to cross Lake Okeechobee.

A survey in 1881 found that Fisheating Creek was one of five main areas in Florida occupied by Seminoles. Non-Indian settlement began impinging on the area in the 20th century. Lakeport, near the mouth of Fisheating Creek, was founded in 1915. Increasing development around Fisheating Creek had forced the Seminoles out of most of the area by 1930. The Brighton Seminole Indian Reservation, established in 1935, is in Glades County adjacent to Fisheating Creek.

== Modern history ==
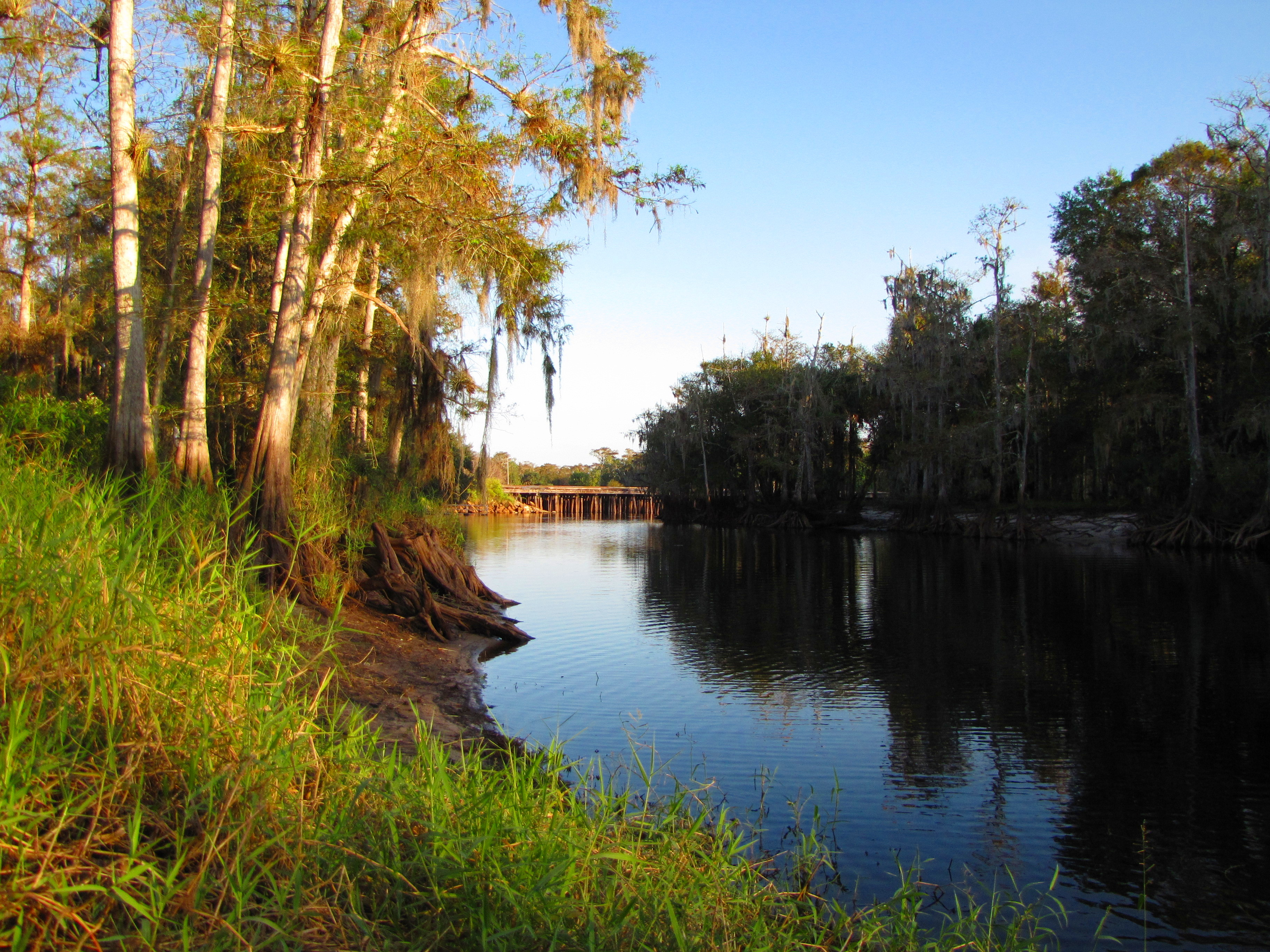
Near a railroad bridge

Lykes Brothers, Inc. acquired the land around Fisheating Creek early in the 20th century and used it as largely unimproved cattle range. The company owned 67% of the land in Glades County. For many years Lykes Brothers allowed public access to fisheating Creek and the land around the Creek, including a waterfront park, campground, and canoe concession at Palmdale and 76,000 acres (310 km^{2}) open to hunting in a Game Management Area leased to the state of Florida.

Lykes Brothers began closing public access to its land along Fisheating Creek in the 1980s, apparently in response to increased vandalism and poaching. Lykes Brothers did not renew the state's lease on the Wildlife Management Area in 1987, instead leasing the land to a private company that charged fees for hunting rights on the land. In 1989 Lykes closed the waterside park, campground, and canoe concession, and erected fences and gates to block access to land formerly open to the public. Lykes also placed logs and other obstructions in Fisheating Creek to block access by boats.

In March 1989 residents of Glades County broke open a gate that Lykes Brothers had placed on an old road to block access to Fisheating Creek. The Glades County Commission then ordered the gate and nearby fence to be bulldozed, claiming that the land in question belonged to the county. Lykes Brothers then sued the county. The legal fight soon settled on the question of whether or not Fisheating Creek was a navigable waterway. If the stream was navigable, then its bed, up to the high water mark, belonged to Florida. A court decided in 1998 that the stream was navigable, and therefore belonged to the state. Lykes Brothers prepared to appeal the decision, but a settlement to end litigation was agreed to by Florida and Lykes Brothers.

As part of the settlement Florida paid $46.4 million to Lykes Brothers to purchase 18,272 acres (73.94 km^{2}) along the stream, which became the Fisheating Creek Wildlife Management Area (WMA). The state also bought a conservation easement on another 41,523 acres (168.04 km^{2}) of Lykes Brothers land. The settlement also calls on the state to maintain a navigation channel in Fisheating Creek from Lake Okeechobee to the U. S. Route 27 bridge at Palmdale. Motor vehicles and jet-powered watercraft are prohibited from the WMA, and airboats are banned from parts of Cowbone Marsh. Hunting is limited in the WMA.

== See also ==
- Charlotte River
