= Citrus Center, Florida =

Unincorporated community in Florida, United States

Coordinates: 26°48′44.51″N 81°14′50.07″W

Citrus Center is an unincorporated community in Glades County, Florida, United States, located on State Road 78 approximately 4 miles (6.4 km) west of the junction of SR 78 and U.S. Route 27, west of Moore Haven.
