= Austin Simmons =

American football player (born 2005)

- Simmons in 2026

No. 13 – Missouri Tigers
- Position: Quarterback
- Class: (redshirt) Junior

Personal information
- Born: November 8, 2005 (age 21)
- Listed height: 6 ft 4 in (1.93 m)
- Listed weight: 220 lb (100 kg)

Career information
- High school: Moore Haven Junior Senior (Moore Haven, Florida)
- College: Ole Miss (2023–2025); Missouri (2026–present)
- Stats at ESPN

Austin David Simmons (born November 8, 2005) is an American college football quarterback for the Missouri Tigers. He previously played for the Ole Miss Rebels. He also played for the Ole Miss Rebels baseball team.

== Early life ==
Simmons attended Pahokee High School in Pahokee, Florida before transferring to Moore Haven Junior Senior High School in Moore Haven, Florida. As a sophomore he passed for 3,253 yards and 27 touchdowns. Simmons reclassified from the 2025 to 2023 recruiting class. He originally committed to play college football at the University of Florida before changing his commitment to the University of Mississippi.

While enrolled in high school, Simmons was also enrolled and earning college credits at Miami Dade College, completing an associate degree from that school before turning 17. He received a bachelor's degree from Ole Miss in May 2025.

== College career ==
=== 2023 season ===
Simmons was the third-string quarterback throughout 2023 season. As a result, Simmons was redshirted. After the season, he appeared in 13 games as a relief pitcher on the baseball team, going 2–0 with 3.21 earned run average (ERA) with 20 strikeouts over 14 innings pitched.

=== 2024 season ===
Simmons began his redshirt freshman year in 2024 as the backup to senior quarterback Jaxson Dart. In his first collegiate game, he recorded 7 completions, 111 yards, and he threw his first career touchdown pass. He made minor appearances in relief against Middle Tennessee State, Wake Forest, Georgia Southern, and Kentucky before helping the Rebels break or tie single-game team passing records in yards and touchdowns against Arkansas, Simmons threw for 47 yards and a touchdown finishing an Ole Miss victory of 63-32. On November 9, 2024, Simmons came off the bench versus Georgia for a crucial first quarter drive following a minor injury to Jaxson Dart, Simmons went 5-of-6 for 64 yards and led his team to the endzone ultimately giving the Rebels the offensive spark they needed to get a 28-10 victory.

=== 2025 season ===
Simmons began his third year as the Rebels' starting quarterback. He passed for 341 yards and 3 touchdowns in their week 1 victory over Georgia State. In week 2 against Kentucky, Simmons left the game with an ankle injury, forcing backup Trinidad Chambliss to finish the 30-23 win over the Wildcats. Due to Simmons's injury, Chambliss started against Arkansas the following week, and took over the starting quarterback role for the rest of the season.

Simmons saw limited action for the remainder of 2025. From week 3 onward, he appeared in 4 games, completing 12 of 20 passes for 168 yards and a single touchdown in that span.

On January 2, 2026, Simmons announced his intention to enter the transfer portal. On January 6, 2026, he signed with the Missouri Tigers. Despite signing at Missouri, Simmons opted to remain with the Ole Miss Rebels for the remainder of their College Football Playoff run.

=== 2026 season ===
In Week 5 against No. 8 Florida, Simmons went 23 of 30 for 340 yards and two touchdowns in a 45–17 victory.

== Career statistics ==
=== College football ===
Year	Team	Games			Passing								Rushing			
Year	Team	GP	GS	Record	Cmp	Att	Pct	Yds	Y/A	TD	Int	Rtg	Att	Yds	Avg	TD
2023	Ole Miss	0	0	—	Redshirted (redshirt)											
2024	Ole Miss	9	0	—	19	32	59.4	282	8.8	2	0	154.0	5	14	2.8	0
2025	Ole Miss	8	2	2–0	45	75	60.0	744	9.9	4	5	147.6	22	71	3.2	1
2026	Missouri	10	10	6–4	192	308	62.3	2,379	7.7	21	3	147.8	27	16	0.6	0
Career		27	12	8–4	256	415	61.7	3,405	8.2	27	8	148.2	54	101	1.9	1

=== College baseball ===
Year	Team	G	GS	W	L	ERA	CG	SHO	SV	IP	H	R	ER	HR	BB	SO
2024	Ole Miss	13	0	2	0	3.21	0	0	0	14.0	9	7	5	0	11	20
Career		13	0	2	0	3.21	0	0	0	14.0	9	7	5	0	11	20
