= Muse, Florida =

Unincorporated community in Florida, United States

- Unincorporated community
- Location within Florida
- Coordinates: 26°49′40″N 81°29′45″W
- Country: United States
- State: Florida
- County: Glades
- Elevation: 46 ft (14 m)
- Time zone: UTC-5
  - Summer (DST): UTC-4 (EDT)
- Area code: 863
- GNIS feature ID: 295469

Muse, previously misspelled on federal maps as Muce, is an unincorporated community in Glades County, Florida, United States. The spelling of Muse was officially corrected on federal maps on April 11, 2019.

== History ==
Muse, originally spelled "Meuse," was owned and homesteaded by John Browning, Will Ballard, Dallas Douglas, Mr. Wills, Mr. Thompson, Jim and John Dese, Cornelius Poole, Crisp, F.W. Coker, and the Langford family, Berry Summerall family, and Harley Altman family. Land is still owned by heirs of the original settlers through U.S. Government patents. Settlers used to call mosquitos, "gallenippers."

An acre was donated for a cemetery by Harley Altman, which was originally a private cemetery for her son, Hoyt Altman. Considered to be a local mystery, Alice Grace Long, who died in 1912, was found at the Carson Scrub Cemetery and not the Muse cemetery.

Forty acres was homesteaded by Cornelius Poole.

For business, the Deese family was known to have walked from Muse to Arcadia and LaBelle.

Farming and moonshine were the original businesses in Muse. The authors of Glades County: Florida History remarked that "hopefully the Gallenippers didn't disturb the workers in either occupation too much," on page 121.

Muse's school and post office shutdown during the Great Depression.

Before burning down in 1980, church services were held in the old local schoolhouse, belonging to M.S. Hayes. Miss Nelosi, Faye Allison, Mr. Fanning, Mr. and Mrs. Clyde Taylor, Mrs. O.C. Head, Nell Jackman, and Mrs. Alice Bailey. Bailey rode from LaBelle to Muse, on horseback, every day to teach.

In 1985, large amounts of property were known to be owned by the 6-L Company, run by the Lipman Brothers. Lipman Produce is the "largest field tomato grower in the United States."

Owning tree farms and cattle ranches, the Lykes Brothers Inc. offers deer, quail, and turkey hunts and fishing tours, on its 1,867-acre Silver Lake Preserve. Dr. Howell Tyson Lykes founded the company in 1900 and is owned by the descendants of his seven sons.

Jeff Freeman's Rainbow Farms bred and raised Thoroughbred horses, racing thirty of them nationally, in 1985. Muse also featured a plant nursery, rottweiler kennel and training center.

Residents raised money for their own local volunteer fire department.

== Awards ==
- Gov. Jeb Bush acknowledged Muse winning the Florida's Outstanding Rural Community of the Year 2002 award after "providing a safe community shelter to be used during storms."

== Honey Festival ==
- Muse hosts the annual Honey Festival at the Muse Community Park.

== Memorials ==
- The Community Center features a veteran memorial to Jim J. Greer at the base of the flagpole. Memorial reads as follows: In Memory of, SMSGT Jim J. Greer, USAF RET., Glades County Tax Collector, January 1994 to October 2000, For His Outstanding Service, To Muse and Glades County, The Muse Community Association, April 18, 2002.

== Geography ==
Located 11 miles west of Linden Pens Marsh; in Sec 11, T42S, R28E, Tallahassee Meridian, with an elevation of 46 feet, directly north of LaBelle, between the Babcock-Webb Wildlife Management Area and State Road 29, along County Road 720, fifty-three miles east of Punta Gorda, and twenty-nine miles east of Babcock Ranch.

Muse is located near the intersection of Charlotte, Lee, Glades, and Hendry counties.

== Education ==
- West Glades School
