= Gatorama =

Florida animal park and alligator farm

Coordinates: 26°55′3″N 81°17′27″W

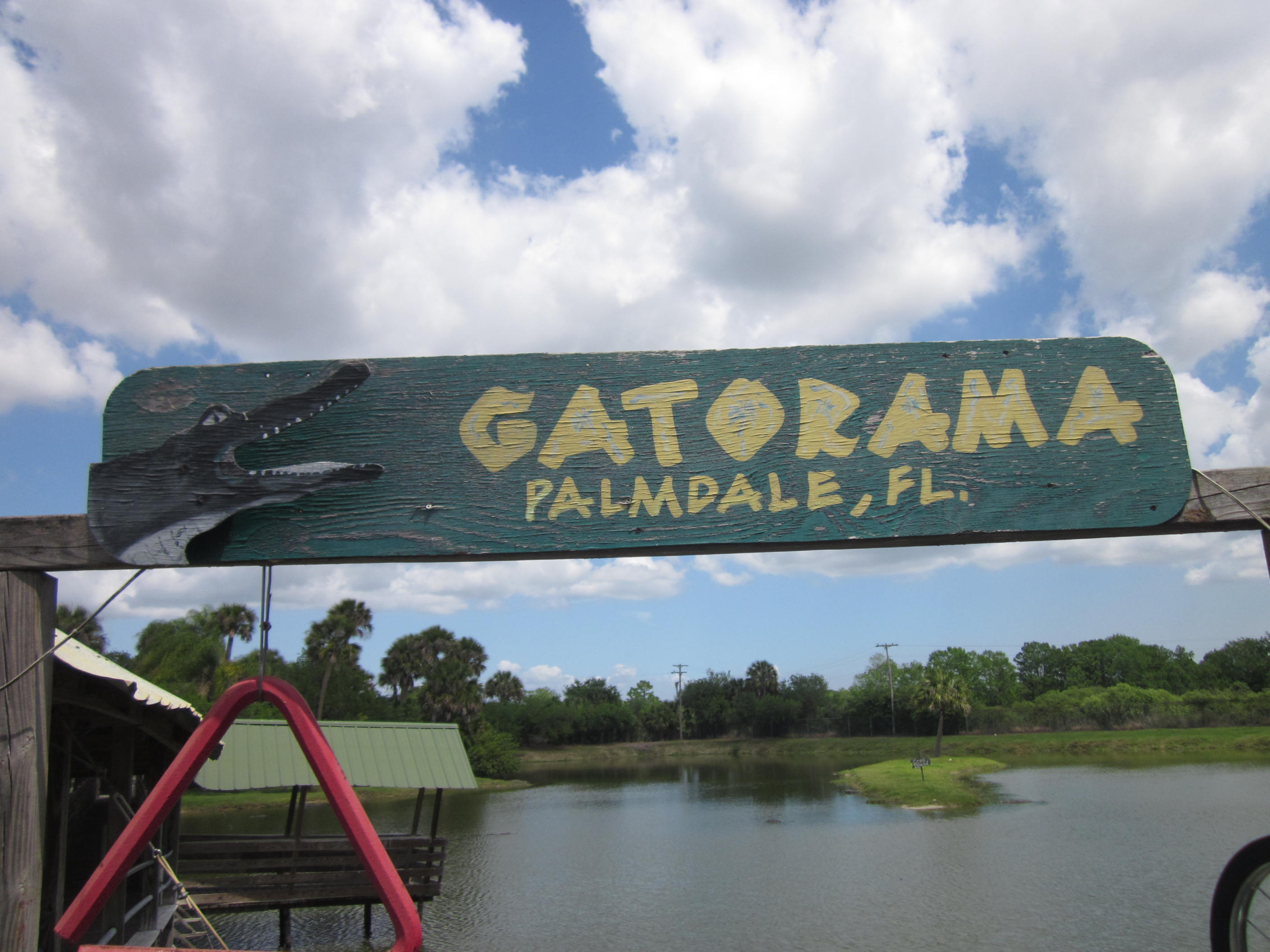
- Photograph March 2012
- Interactive map of Gatorama
- Slogan: Play Wild!
- Date opened: 1957
- Location: Palmdale
- Owner: Allen and Patty Register
- Website: www.gatorama.com

Gatorama is an alligator farm and visitor attraction in Palmdale, Florida, USA. Alligators and crocodiles are raised on the farm for meat and skins. Gatorama is one of Florida's oldest roadside attractions. Only six alligator farms are open to the public as attractions.

== History ==
Cecil Clemons opened the farm in 1957. The alligators were captured locally in the 1960s. Wild crocodiles were caught in Jamaica in 1967-1968.

Allen and Patty Register acquired the property in 2006.

== Attractions ==
Visitors can hold baby alligators as well as pythons. Adult participants can perform the "Fast Hands Challenge" to feed an adult alligator. The daily feed show is free with admission, where guests can watch keepers hand feed alligators from the front bridge.

Gatorama has an exhibit dedicated to the critically endangered Orinoco crocodile. The park works with Florida Fish and Wildlife's Statewide Nuisance Alligator Program (SNAP) program to rehome nuisance alligators.

Gatorama also features other native Florida wildlife such as the Florida panther, bobcats, racoons, birds, and snakes.

In late August, Gatorama hosts an annual Gator Hatchling Festival where visitors can hold an alligator egg while it hatches.

Gatorama also sells exotic meat at the park and on their website.
