= Charlotte River (Florida) =

Mythical river in Florida, United States

The Charlotte River (also Macaco River) is a former name for what was thought to be a continuous river draining Lake Okeechobee (formerly Lake Macaco) into Charlotte Harbor. Although an 1842 map indicates that the Charlotte was the same as the Caloosahatchee River, other sources distinguish the two from each other. Most maps that include the river show it following what is now known as Shell Creek east from the Peace River and splitting into multiple branches, with the south branch receiving water from Lake Macaco, a north or northeast branch, and a central branch labeled as Lost Creek. The most prominent actual waterway near the east half of the supposed Charlotte River is Fisheating Creek

The border between St. Johns and Monroe Counties was defined to follow the Charlotte River in 1823, and remained there (with various counties replacing St. Johns to the north) until it was moved south to the township line (now the Charlotte-Lee border) in 1859. Most maps postdating the discovery that the Charlotte River did not exist placed the line along the Caloosahatchee River.
