= LaBelle, Florida =

- City
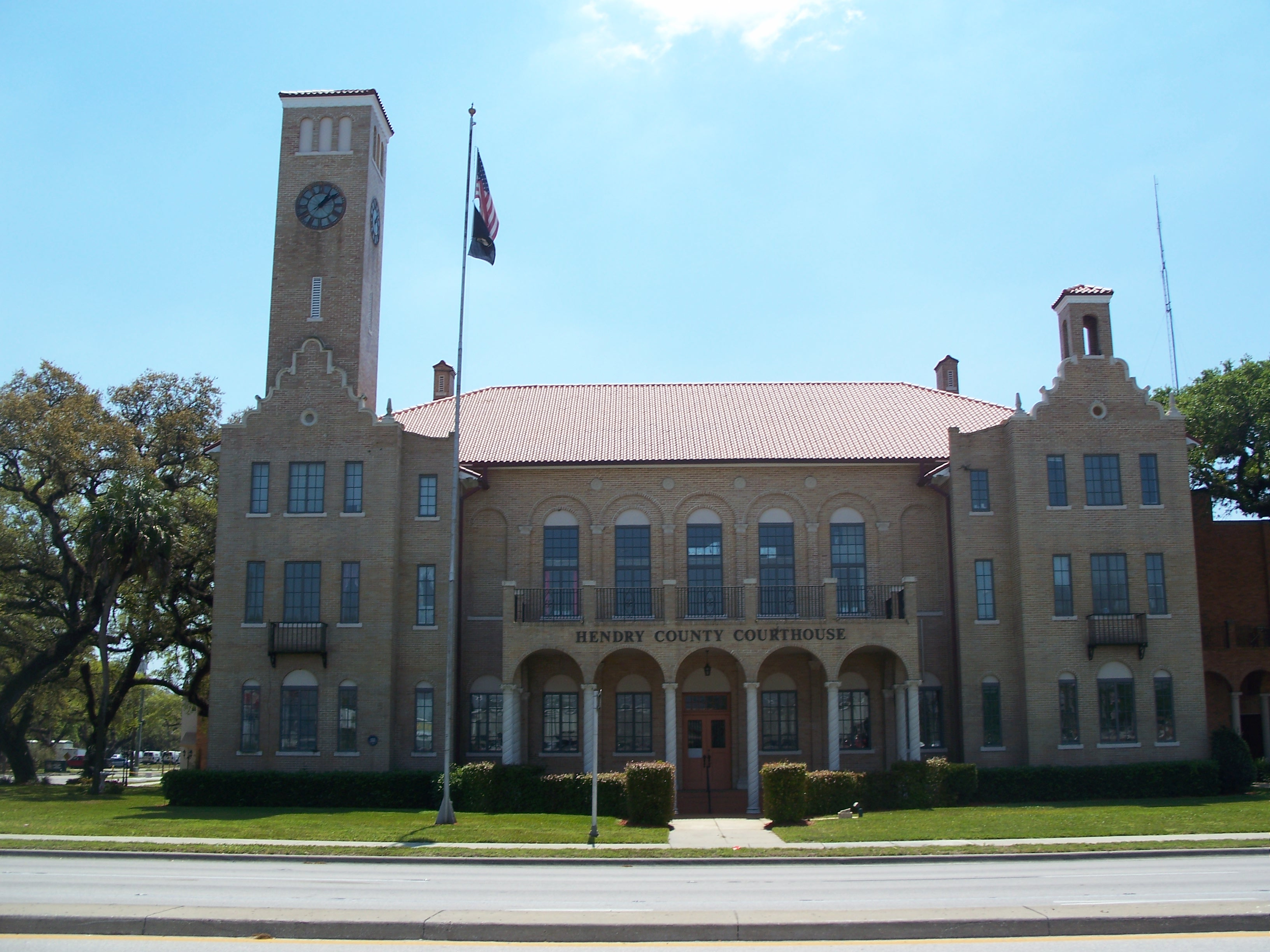
- Old Hendry County Courthouse

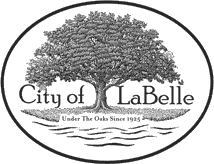
- Seal
- Nickname: The Belle of the Caloosahatchee
- Motto: "The City Under the Oaks"
- Location in Hendry County and the state of Florida
- Coordinates: 26°44′23″N 81°26′41″W
- Country: United States
- State: Florida
- County: Hendry
- Incorporated: 1925

Area
  - Total: 14.59 sq mi (37.78 km^{2})
  - Land: 14.49 sq mi (37.52 km^{2})
  - Water: 0.097 sq mi (0.25 km^{2})
- Elevation: 20 ft (6.1 m)

Population (2020)
  - Total: 4,966
  - Density: 342.8/sq mi (132.35/km^{2})
- Time zone: UTC-5 (Eastern (EST))
  - Summer (DST): UTC-4 (EDT)
- ZIP codes: 33935, 33975
- Area code: 863
- FIPS code: 12-37225
- GNIS feature ID: 2404850
- Website: www.citylabelle.com

LaBelle is a city in and the county seat of Hendry County, Florida, United States. The population was 4,966 at the 2020 census, up from 4,640 at the 2010 census. It is part of the Clewiston, FL Micropolitan Statistical Area (μSA).

It was named for Laura June Hendry and Carrie Belle Hendry, daughters of pioneer cattleman Francis Asbury Hendry.

LaBelle hosts the annual Swamp Cabbage Festival, which is held in honor of the Florida state tree during the last full weekend of February.

== History ==
LaBelle began as a settlement on the Caloosahatchee River around the time of Hamilton Disston's efforts to drain the Everglades with the hope of promoting growth. The settlement, which lay on the western edge of Captain Francis A. Hendry's large Monroe County property, was initially populated with Florida cracker cow hunters and wild game trappers.

By 1891, LaBelle had constructed its first school on the ground of what would become the white-columned LaBelle School, built in 1915. By 1921, LaBelle school was one of 18 accredited schools in Florida. The campus is now Edward A. Upthegrove Elementary School, named after one of LaBelle's original two families.

In 1909, Captain Hendry subdivided his land from the Lee County courthouse to be sold. The majority landholding stake was bought by Edgar Everett (E. E.) Goodno, which increased LaBelle to almost twenty times its original size. In May 1924, Henry Ford acquired 7,000 acres (2,800 ha) in LaBelle from E. E. Goodno. Ford had made a loan of $166,986.46 to Goodno in 1922, securing the loan with Goodno's property. Two years later, Ford cancelled Goodno's debt and mortgage, gave him $63,000, and took the 7,000 acre deed from Goodno. Goodno stayed to manage the property, raising Poll Angus cattle, Brahman cattle, and Angora goats.

LaBelle's first church, a Methodist congregation, was established in 1891 and soon absorbed an older Methodist Church in nearby Fort Denaud. In 1912, LaBelle also had a Baptist church, among other denominations, with mass baptisms in the Caloosahatchee River.

LaBelle became the county seat of Hendry County in 1923. In 1925, the Florida Legislature chartered the City of LaBelle, which replaced the Town of LaBelle. D. A. Mitchell was named the first mayor.

In 1926, LaBelle residents tortured and lynched Henry Patterson, a young African-American road construction worker, for asking a white woman for a drink of water.

In 1929, with part of LaBelle residing in Glades County and the majority in Hendry, the government of Glades County proposed resolving a bond dispute with the Hendry County government by surrendering all parts of LaBelle in Glades County. In an approved public referendum, the proposal was put forth and the portion of LaBelle in Glades was surrendered. Eight years later, the surrendered part of North LaBelle voted to annex itself back into Hendry County, as residents felt that the Glades County government in Moore Haven was ignoring them. The vote succeeded and what was previously North LaBelle was united back with the city of LaBelle.

== Geography ==
LaBelle is located in northwestern Hendry County, on the south side of the Caloosahatchee River.

Florida State Road 80 passes through the center of LaBelle, leading east 31 miles (50 km) to Clewiston and west 30 miles (48 km) to Fort Myers. Florida State Road 29 crosses SR 80 in the center of LaBelle and leads northeast 15 miles (24 km) to Palmdale and south 24 miles (39 km) to Immokalee.

According to the United States Census Bureau, LaBelle has a total area of 15.6 square miles (40.4 km^{2}), of which 15.5 square miles (40.2 km^{2}) are land and 0.1 square miles (0.2 km^{2}), or 0.60%, are water.

=== Climate ===
The climate in this area is characterized by hot, humid summers and generally warm winters. According to the Köppen Climate Classification system, LaBelle has a humid subtropical climate, bordering on a tropical savanna climate, abbreviated "Cfa"/“Aw” on climate maps.

== Demographics ==
Historical population
Census	Pop.	Note	%±
1920	377		—
1930	397		5.3%
1940	837		110.8%
1950	945		12.9%
1960	1,262		33.5%
1970	1,823		44.5%
1980	2,287		25.5%
1990	2,703		18.2%
2000	4,210		55.8%
2010	4,640		10.2%
2020	4,966		7.0%
U.S. Decennial Census

=== Racial and ethnic composition ===
LaBelle racial composition (Hispanics excluded from racial categories) (NH = Non-Hispanic)
Race	Pop 2010	Pop 2020	% 2010	% 2020
White (NH)	2,034	1,730	43.84%	34.84%
Black or African American (NH)	359	328	7.74%	6.60%
Native American or Alaska Native (NH)	9	15	0.19%	0.30%
Asian (NH)	28	24	0.60%	0.48%
Pacific Islander or Native Hawaiian (NH)	0	1	0.00%	0.02%
Some other race (NH)	7	17	0.15%	0.34%
Two or more races/Multiracial (NH)	22	71	0.47%	1.43%
Hispanic or Latino (any race)	2,181	2,780	47.00%	55.98%
Total	4,640	4,966		

=== 2020 census ===
As of the 2020 census, LaBelle had a population of 4,966. The median age was 35.5 years. 25.5% of residents were under the age of 18 and 17.2% of residents were 65 years of age or older. For every 100 females, there were 108.4 males, and for every 100 females age 18 and over, there were 105.7 males age 18 and over.

98.5% of residents lived in urban areas, while 1.5% lived in rural areas.

There were 1,617 households in LaBelle, of which 40.0% had children under the age of 18 living in them. Of all households, 44.0% were married-couple households, 18.4% were households with a male householder and no spouse or partner present, and 29.5% were households with a female householder and no spouse or partner present. About 22.8% of all households were made up of individuals and 12.8% had someone living alone who was 65 years of age or older.

There were 2,037 housing units, of which 20.6% were vacant. The homeowner vacancy rate was 3.3% and the rental vacancy rate was 7.8%.

=== Demographic estimates ===
In the 2016-2020 American Community Survey 5-year estimates, there were 1,036 families residing in the city.

=== 2010 census ===
As of the 2010 United States census, there were 4,640 people, 1,679 households, and 1,203 families residing in the city.

=== 2000 census ===
As of the census of 2000, there were 4,210 people, 1,440 households, and 995 families residing in the city. The population density was 1,214.0 inhabitants per square mile (468.7/km^{2}). There were 1,739 housing units at an average density of 501.4 per square mile (193.6/km^{2}). The racial makeup of the city was 73.28% White, 11.26% African American, 0.62% Native American, 0.33% Asian, 12.47% from other races, and 2.04% from two or more races. Hispanic or Latino of any race were 31.35% of the population.

In 2000, there were 1,440 households, out of which 32.2% had children under the age of 18 living with them, 55.2% were married couples living together, 10.2% had a female householder with no husband present, and 30.9% were non-families. 25.9% of all households were made up of individuals, and 14.1% had someone living alone who was 65 years of age or older. The average household size was 2.71 and the average family size was 3.26.

In 2000, in the city the population was spread out, with 26.8% under the age of 18, 8.5% from 18 to 24, 25.5% from 25 to 44, 18.3% from 45 to 64, and 20.9% who were 65 years of age or older. The median age was 36 years. For every 100 females, there were 102.7 males. For every 100 females age 18 and over, there were 99.8 males.

In 2000, the median income for a household in the city was $31,642, and the median income for a family was $39,550. Males had a median income of $26,327 versus $21,979 for females. The per capita income for the city was $15,652. About 12.9% of families and 18.0% of the population were below the poverty line, including 21.1% of those under age 18 and 15.4% of those age 65 or over.

== Arts and culture ==
The city of LaBelle holds an annual festival celebrating the state tree, the cabbage palm. The festival includes activities throughout the town including a 5K walk/run, beauty pageant and rodeo among others, with the peak of celebration at LaBelle's Barron Park.

== Education ==
LaBelle's education system is made up of four elementary schools (LaBelle Elementary, Country Oaks Elementary, Edward A. Upthegrove Elementary, and West Glades Elementary), one middle school (LaBelle Middle) and one high school (LaBelle High School). There also is a private school named International Christian Academy of Labelle.

== Notable people ==
- Mary Hayes Davis, publisher of The Hendry County News, Secretary of Chamber of Commerce
- Bill Gramática, NFL place kicker
- Martín Gramática, NFL place kicker
