= Palmdale, Florida =

Unincorporated community in Florida, United States

Palmdale is an unincorporated community in Glades County, Florida, United States, located on US 27 just north of the junction with State Road 29.

== History ==
Originally part of DeSoto County, Palmdale's land was pioneered by Florida Fruit Farm Corporation, selling the land to the Palmdale Land Company, which sold the land to five-hundred settlers, creating the first community in 1911. Many farmers were "discouraged" by the lack of transportation, prompting them to move out of the area by 1917. Many of these farmers left their homes behind, along with their personal belongings and furniture. New farmers and pioneers to the area would take up residence in the abandoned homesteads. Eventually, wildfires destroyed many of the original homesteads.

The earliest descriptions of Palmdale describe residents that "can-do, make-do, and out-do," which are "Crackers to the core, with staunch tradition of loyalty to God, family, home and country."

The "Tin Lizzie Trail," two dirt roads connected Arcadia and Lakeport. During rainy season, the longer "high road" of the trail was used while the more direct "low road" of the trail was used during the dry season.

Most people moved to Palmdale to farm the land and sell livestock. Adrian M. Link grew "several large citrus groves" and was a poultry farmer. "Mr. Fogg" described Palmdale as "The Garden of Eden." Fogg covered his land with blueberries, which were completely eaten by the birds.

Palmdale's original settlers were the Rean family, H.L. Delaney family, Ross family, Hart family, Snell family, Arnold family, Lanier family, Weinser family, A.Z. Hogan family, Wibb family, Streety Whidden family, Hendry family, Jones family, Cobb family, Willie Williams family, Norman Milton, Emery Nickelson, Lacy Raulerson and Joe Peeples Sr. There was also "a Mr. Thompson who ran a store at the railroad camp."

The original teachers were Mr. Locke, Arthur Hilton, Mary Clark, Maud Allison, Alton P. Gaines, Hilda Yeomans, Edith Pervis, Edith Daughtery and Rual Haskew.

There were not any churches built in Palmdale until the Baptist church, in the 1950s. Until then, church was held in people's homes.

H.C. Delaney operated the first general store and post office, followed by J.W. Snell, L.E. Guess and Peck Stalls. For thirty-six years, Peck Stalls held the office of postmaster. The post office moved to its own building after Stalls sold the general store. Mrs. Willie Powers then took over as "postmistress."

At some time, Palmdale also featured a photo studio.

Palmdale's economy was stimulated by a short "boom" in the early 1920s, with political rallies held at Fisheating Creek. "Barbecues and political speeches were attended by as many as 500-700 people." A train from Moore Haven, the Atlantic Coast Line Railroad, brought people who wanted to attend the rallies.

Oil drilling began in 1921 by the Palmdale Land Company under the supervision of company president "Mr. Marcus" and vice-president E.F. Caldwell. Through invitation of Caldwell, the Brewton Oil Company began drilling under the guidance of Robert J. Brewton due to the fact that Caldwell was "positive oil would be found." Gopher Gulley and Harness Pond were the first two sites drilled, Harness Pond to 2,800 feet, only to turn up dry.

After failing to find oil, Brewton Oil left. Geologists Smith Brooks and Ed Barnett claimed that the Harness Pond well "was not deep enough" at 2,800 feet.

The Lykes Brothers, bought land, opening canoeing, horseback riding, fishing with RV camping and tent camping, for the public, through Fisheating Creek Outpost and other wilderness areas.

Started by John and Audrey Hartman in the 1970s, recognized internationally, Hartman Nursery, was known for "tissue culture" and the "cloning of plants." The cloning process was passed on from father to son, Robert Hartman, who during the 1980s, shipped millions plants around the world, "growing them from tissue cuts."

Forbes Magazine recognized Hartman Nursery as "one of the few successful commercial ventures in the field of cloning." At the time, the nursery had "research facilities, growing laboratories, greenhouses, and a nature area."

It is home to Gatorama, self-proclaimed to feature "some of the largest Crocodiles and Alligators in Florida," built by Cecil Clemons in 1957. One of the state's first alligator attractions, it also has the largest captive breeding colony of American crocodiles in North America.

On October 21, 2016, a fire destroyed the historic Palmdale Cracker, a restaurant recently re-opened the year before. The owner, Larry Taylor, described the restaurant and general store as the "only nucleus that held these people together." The 1930s era house featuring a large porch and was a gathering place for both residents and wayfarers on 27. The building was one of the few historic landmarks in that part of Glades County.

== Geography ==
Palmdale is located at 26°56′43″N 81°18′58″W.

== See also ==
- Ortona Prehistoric Village
- Fisheating Creek
