= Matlacha, Florida =

- Census-designated place
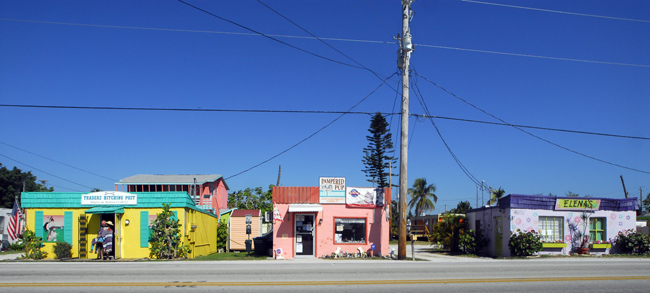
- Downtown Matlacha

- Location in Lee County and the state of Florida
- Coordinates: 26°37′36″N 82°04′12″W
- Country: United States
- State: Florida
- County: Lee

Area
  - Total: 0.67 sq mi (1.73 km^{2})
  - Land: 0.20 sq mi (0.51 km^{2})
  - Water: 0.47 sq mi (1.21 km^{2})
- Elevation: 3 ft (0.91 m)

Population (2020)
  - Total: 598
  - Density: 3,012.6/sq mi (1,163.16/km^{2})
- Time zone: UTC-5 (Eastern (EST))
  - Summer (DST): UTC-4 (EDT)
- ZIP code: 33993
- Area code: 239
- FIPS code: 12-43475
- GNIS feature ID: 2403264

Matlacha ( /ˈmætləʃeɪ/ MAT-lə-shay "MAT-la-shay") is a census-designated place (CDP) in Lee County, Florida, United States. The CDP had a population of 598 at the 2020 census, down from 677 at the 2010 census. It is part of the Cape Coral-Fort Myers, Florida Metropolitan Statistical Area.

Matlacha is an "Old Florida" fishing village, home to many brightly colored art galleries, island boutiques, seafood restaurants, and traditional Floridian cottages. The village was largely devastated by Hurricane Ian in October 2022.

== Geography ==
Matlacha is located in northwestern Lee County on West Island and Porpoise Point Island at a narrow point in Matlacha Pass, a tidal waterway separating Pine Island and Little Pine Island from the mainland. County Road 78 (Southwest Pine Island Road) crosses the waterway at Matlacha, leading southwest 3 miles (5 km) to Pine Island Center and northeast through Cape Coral 12 miles (19 km) to North Fort Myers. Matlacha is bordered to the northeast, across Matlacha Pass, by the Matlacha Isles-Matlacha Shores CDP.

According to the United States Census Bureau, the Matlacha CDP has a total area of 0.69 square miles (1.78 km^{2}), of which 0.20 square miles (0.52 km^{2}) are land and 0.49 square miles (1.26 km^{2}), or 70.99%, are water.

== Demographics ==
Historical population
Census	Pop.	Note	%±
2000	735		—
2010	677		−7.9%
2020	598		−11.7%
U.S. Decennial Census

As of the census of 2000, there were 735 people, 409 households, and 213 families residing in the CDP. The population density was 4,878.7 inhabitants per square mile (1,883.7/km^{2}). There were 579 housing units at an average density of 3,843.3 per square mile (1,483.9/km^{2}). The racial makeup of the CDP was 98.23% White, 0.27% Native American, 0.27% Asian, 0.68% from other races, and 0.54% from two or more races. Hispanic or Latino of any race were 1.36% of the population. As of the 2010 census, Matlacha's population decreased to 677 and the town's African-American population increased from 0 in 2000 to 2 in 2010.

There were 409 households, out of which 6.4% had children under the age of 18 living with them, 46.9% were married couples living together, 3.9% had a female householder with no husband present, and 47.7% were non-families. 39.4% of all households were made up of individuals, and 19.3% had someone living alone who was 65 years of age or older. The average household size was 1.80 and the average family size was 2.33.

In the CDP, the population was spread out, with 7.3% under the age of 18, 2.4% from 18 to 24, 17.4% from 25 to 44, 34.7% from 45 to 64, and 38.1% who were 65 years of age or older. The median age was 58 years. For every 100 females, there were 105.9 males. For every 100 females age 18 and over, there were 106.4 males.

The median income for a household in the CDP was $36,417, and the median income for a family was $50,000. Males had a median income of $28,056 versus $28,750 for females. The per capita income for the CDP was $24,371. About 7.4% of families and 9.2% of the population were below the poverty line, including 23.9% of those under age 18 and 2.8% of those age 65 or over.
