= Buckhead Ridge, Florida =

CDP in Florida, United States

- CDP
- Location in Glades County and the state of Florida
- Coordinates: 27°07′59″N 80°53′02″W
- Country: United States
- State: Florida
- County: Glades

Area
  - Total: 1.51 sq mi (3.92 km^{2})
  - Land: 1.40 sq mi (3.63 km^{2})
  - Water: 0.11 sq mi (0.29 km^{2})
- Elevation: 13 ft (4.0 m)

Population (2020)
  - Total: 1,509
  - Density: 1,076.5/sq mi (415.63/km^{2})
- Time zone: UTC-5 (Eastern (EST))
  - Summer (DST): UTC-4 (EDT)
- ZIP code: 34974
- Area code: 863
- FIPS code: 12-09315
- GNIS feature ID: 2402725

Buckhead Ridge is a census-designated place (CDP) in Glades County, Florida, United States. The population was 1,509 at the 2020 census, up from 1,450 at the 2010 census. It is part of the Clewiston, Florida Micropolitan Statistical Area (μSA). The community consists of a few small commercial developments and a large mobile home park. Most residential lots in the community have canals that feed into Lake Okeechobee.

== Geography ==
According to the United States Census Bureau, the CDP has a total area of 1.4 square miles (3.6 km^{2}), of which, 1.3 square miles (3.4 km^{2}) of it is land and 0.1 square miles (0.26 km^{2}) of it (7.09%) is water.

== Demographics ==
Historical population
Census	Pop.	Note	%±
1990	1,279		—
2000	1,390		8.7%
2010	1,450		4.3%
2020	1,509		4.1%
U.S. Decennial Census

=== 2020 census ===
As of the 2020 census, Buckhead Ridge had a population of 1,509. The median age was 63.0 years. 10.1% of residents were under the age of 18 and 45.4% of residents were 65 years of age or older. For every 100 females there were 103.6 males, and for every 100 females age 18 and over there were 105.9 males age 18 and over.

95.9% of residents lived in urban areas, while 4.1% lived in rural areas.

There were 744 households in Buckhead Ridge, of which 10.1% had children under the age of 18 living in them. Of all households, 43.7% were married-couple households, 29.6% were households with a male householder and no spouse or partner present, and 18.7% were households with a female householder and no spouse or partner present. About 34.8% of all households were made up of individuals and 21.5% had someone living alone who was 65 years of age or older.

There were 1,137 housing units, of which 34.6% were vacant. The homeowner vacancy rate was 2.8% and the rental vacancy rate was 11.3%.

Racial composition as of the 2020 census
Race	Number	Percent
White	1,391	92.2%
Black or African American	28	1.9%
American Indian and Alaska Native	6	0.4%
Asian	8	0.5%
Native Hawaiian and Other Pacific Islander	0	0.0%
Some other race	19	1.3%
Two or more races	57	3.8%
Hispanic or Latino (of any race)	75	5.0%

=== 2000 census ===
As of the census of 2000, there were 1,390 people, 694 households, and 465 families residing in the CDP. The population density was 1,066.3 inhabitants per square mile (411.7/km^{2}). There were 1,149 housing units at an average density of 881.4 per square mile (340.3/km^{2}). The racial makeup of the CDP was 98.35% White, 0.14% African American, 0.07% Native American, 0.07% Asian, 0.14% from other races, and 1.22% from two or more races. Hispanic or Latino of any race were 0.94% of the population.

There were 694 households, out of which 8.9% had children under the age of 18 living with them, 57.8% were married couples living together, 5.5% had a female householder with no husband present, and 32.9% were non-families. 26.1% of all households were made up of individuals, and 18.2% had someone living alone who was 65 years of age or older. The average household size was 2.00 and the average family size was 2.33.

In the CDP, the population was spread out, with 9.9% under the age of 18, 3.5% from 18 to 24, 12.3% from 25 to 44, 31.2% from 45 to 64, and 43.2% who were 65 years of age or older. The median age was 62 years. For every 100 females, there were 102.9 males. For every 100 females age 18 and over, there were 98.6 males.

The median income for a household in the CDP was $26,406, and the median income for a family was $28,047. Males had a median income of $36,563 versus $25,726 for females. The per capita income for the CDP was $16,475. About 13.5% of families and 19.4% of the population were below the poverty line, including 29.0% of those under age 18 and 18.2% of those age 65 or over.
