= Lakeport, Florida =

Unincorporated community in Florida, United States

Lakeport is an unincorporated community in Glades County, Florida, United States, located near the western shore of Lake Okeechobee, off State Road 78. It is just south of the Brighton Seminole Indian Reservation.

== Geography ==
Lakeport is located at 26°58′32″N 81°07′18″W.
