= Glades County, Florida =

County in Florida, United States

- County
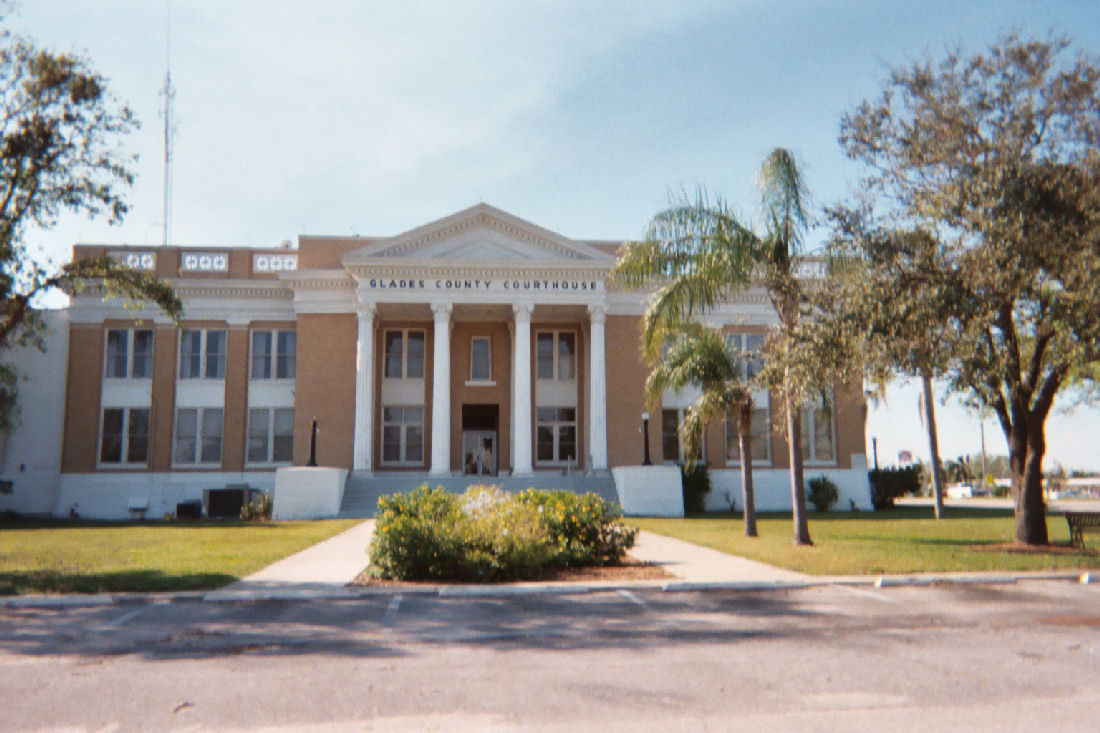
- Glades County Courthouse

- Location within the U.S. state of Florida
- Coordinates: 26°57′N 81°11′W
- Country: United States
- State: Florida
- Founded: April 23, 1921
- Named for: Florida Everglades
- Seat: Moore Haven
- Largest city: Moore Haven

Area
  - Total: 987 sq mi (2,560 km^{2})
  - Land: 806 sq mi (2,090 km^{2})
  - Water: 181 sq mi (470 km^{2}) 18.3%

Population (2020)
  - Total: 12,126
  - Estimate (2025): 13,270 ▲
  - Density: 15.0/sq mi (5.81/km^{2})
- Time zone: UTC−5 (Eastern)
  - Summer (DST): UTC−4 (EDT)
- Congressional district: 18th
- Website: www.myglades.com

Glades County is a county located in the Florida Heartland region of the U.S. state of Florida. As of the 2020 census, the population was 12,126, making it the fourth-least populous county in Florida. Its county seat is Moore Haven. Glades County is in the Clewiston micropolitan area, a Micropolitan statistical area (μSA) which also includes Hendry County. These two counties, along with the Cape Coral-Fort Myers (Lee County) MSA and the Naples-Marco Island (Collier County) MSA, constitute the Cape Coral-Fort Myers-Naples Combined Statistical Area (CSA).

== History ==
Indigenous people lived in this area for thousands of years. Due to warfare and exposure to infectious diseases after European contact, native tribes became depopulated. In the eighteenth century, when the area was under Spanish rule, Native American peoples of Creek and other tribes migrated into present-day Florida from Georgia. Africans and African Americans who escaped from slavery and shipwrecks also migrated to the area, where they created maroon communities. Some were given freedom by the Spanish in exchange for serving with their militias. Gradually the Seminole nation formed out of these multi-ethnic people. Some African-descended people set up communities near the Seminole and became known as Black Seminole. In the nineteenth century, most of the Seminole and many blacks were removed to Indian Territory after the Seminole Wars, a result of pressure from increasing Anglo-American settlement.

Glades County was created, in 1921, from Desoto County. It was named for the Florida Everglades, though most of the county is prairie and pinelands.

It is one of five counties surrounding Lake Okeechobee and the Lake Okeechobee Scenic Trail.

Glades County sponsors one of Florida's oldest recurring festivals. Chalo Nitka Festival is a celebration of local history and culture, similar to a county fair. The festival also draws attention to the long and friendly relationship between the local Seminole groups and Glades County settlers. Brighton Seminole Indian Reservation is located in the county.

== Geography ==
According to the U.S. Census Bureau, the county has a total area of 987 square miles (2,560 km^{2}), of which 806 square miles (2,090 km^{2}) is land and 181 square miles (470 km^{2}) (18.3%) is water.

Fisheating Creek is a stream that flows into Lake Okeechobee in Florida. It is the only remaining free-flowing watercourse feeding into the lake and the second-largest natural source for the lake.

Glades was added to the Clewiston micropolitan area (μSA) in July 2023.

=== Adjacent counties ===
- Highlands County, Florida - north
- Okeechobee County, Florida - northeast
- Martin County, Florida - east
- Palm Beach County, Florida - southeast
- Hendry County, Florida - south
- Lee County, Florida - southwest
- Charlotte County, Florida - west
- DeSoto County, Florida - northwest

=== Climate ===
Climate data for Glades County, Florida (1980-2010)
| Month | Jan | Feb | Mar | Apr | May | Jun | Jul | Aug | Sep | Oct | Nov | Dec | Year |
|---|---|---|---|---|---|---|---|---|---|---|---|---|---|
| Mean daily maximum °F (°C) | 73.7 (23.2) | 76.3 (24.6) | 80.0 (26.7) | 84.1 (28.9) | 89.3 (31.8) | 91.1 (32.8) | 91.8 (33.2) | 91.8 (33.2) | 90.1 (32.3) | 86.1 (30.1) | 80.2 (26.8) | 75.1 (23.9) | 84.1 (29.0) |
| Mean daily minimum °F (°C) | 47.8 (8.8) | 50.9 (10.5) | 54.6 (12.6) | 58.0 (14.4) | 64.6 (18.1) | 70.2 (21.2) | 71.8 (22.1) | 72.4 (22.4) | 71.4 (21.9) | 65.2 (18.4) | 57.3 (14.1) | 51.1 (10.6) | 61.3 (16.3) |
| Average precipitation inches (mm) | 1.9 (48) | 2.5 (64) | 3.3 (84) | 2.3 (58) | 3.3 (84) | 8.6 (220) | 7.7 (200) | 7.9 (200) | 6.7 (170) | 2.7 (69) | 2.0 (51) | 1.9 (48) | 50.8 (1,296) |
Source: USA.com

== Demographics ==
Historical population
| Census | Pop. | Note | %± |
|---|---|---|---|
| 1930 | 2,762 | | — |
| 1940 | 2,745 | | −0.6% |
| 1950 | 2,199 | | −19.9% |
| 1960 | 2,950 | | 34.2% |
| 1970 | 3,669 | | 24.4% |
| 1980 | 5,992 | | 63.3% |
| 1990 | 7,591 | | 26.7% |
| 2000 | 10,576 | | 39.3% |
| 2010 | 12,884 | | 21.8% |
| 2020 | 12,126 | | −5.9% |
| 2025 (est.) | 13,270 | ▲ | 9.4% |
U.S. Decennial Census; 1790-1960 1900-1990; 1990-2000 2010-2019

=== Racial and ethnic composition ===
Glades County, Florida – Racial and ethnic composition Note: the US Census treats Hispanic/Latino as an ethnic category. This table excludes Latinos from the racial categories and assigns them to a separate category. Hispanics/Latinos may be of any race.
| Race / Ethnicity (NH = Non-Hispanic) | Pop 1980 | Pop 1990 | Pop 2000 | Pop 2010 | Pop 2020 | % 1980 | % 1990 | % 2000 | % 2010 | % 2020 |
|---|---|---|---|---|---|---|---|---|---|---|
| White alone (NH) | 4,611 | 5,634 | 7,256 | 7,947 | 7,132 | 76.95% | 74.22% | 68.61% | 61.68% | 58.82% |
| Black or African American alone (NH) | 805 | 916 | 1,106 | 1,538 | 1,434 | 13.43% | 12.07% | 10.46% | 11.94% | 11.83% |
| Native American or Alaska Native alone (NH) | 336 | 425 | 473 | 518 | 193 | 5.61% | 5.60% | 4.47% | 4.02% | 1.59% |
| Asian alone (NH) | 7 | 10 | 31 | 46 | 34 | 0.12% | 0.13% | 0.29% | 0.36% | 0.28% |
| Native Hawaiian or Pacific Islander alone (NH) | x | x | 2 | 2 | 0 | x | x | 0.02% | 0.02% | 0.00% |
| Other race alone (NH) | 5 | 1 | 9 | 10 | 45 | 0.08% | 0.01% | 0.09% | 0.08% | 0.37% |
| Mixed race or Multiracial (NH) | x | x | 105 | 103 | 238 | x | x | 0.99% | 0.80% | 1.96% |
| Hispanic or Latino (any race) | 228 | 605 | 1,594 | 2,720 | 3,050 | 3.81% | 7.97% | 15.07% | 21.11% | 25.15% |
| Total | 5,992 | 7,591 | 10,576 | 12,884 | 12,126 | 100.00% | 100.00% | 100.00% | 100.00% | 100.00% |

A map of racial demographics in Glades County, Florida by Census tract Legend: Non-Hispanic White 40–50% >90% No population

=== 2020 census ===
As of the 2020 census, the county had a population of 12,126. The median age was 45.3 years. 16.8% of residents were under the age of 18 and 25.8% of residents were 65 years of age or older. For every 100 females there were 135.5 males, and for every 100 females age 18 and over there were 143.8 males age 18 and over.

The racial makeup of the county was 68.0% White, 12.1% Black or African American, 1.7% American Indian and Alaska Native, 0.3% Asian, <0.1% Native Hawaiian and Pacific Islander, 7.1% from some other race, and 10.9% from two or more races. Hispanic or Latino residents of any race comprised 25.2% of the population.

17.3% of residents lived in urban areas, while 82.7% lived in rural areas.

There were 4,250 households in the county, of which 25.2% had children under the age of 18 living in them. Of all households, 49.2% were married-couple households, 21.1% were households with a male householder and no spouse or partner present, and 23.0% were households with a female householder and no spouse or partner present. About 27.6% of all households were made up of individuals and 16.7% had someone living alone who was 65 years of age or older.

There were 6,491 housing units, of which 34.5% were vacant. Among occupied housing units, 80.4% were owner-occupied and 19.6% were renter-occupied. The homeowner vacancy rate was 3.0% and the rental vacancy rate was 14.4%.

=== 2000 census ===
As of the 2000 census, there were 10,576 people, 3,852 households, and 2,765 families residing in the county. The population density was 14 people per square mile (5.4 people/km^{2}). There were 5,790 housing units at an average density of 8 per square mile (3.1/km^{2}). The racial makeup of the county was 76.99% White, 10.53% Black or African American, 4.93% Native American, 0.33% Asian, 0.02% Pacific Islander, 5.63% from other races, and 1.58% from two or more races. 15.07% of the population were Hispanic or Latino of any race.

There were 3,852 households, out of which 25.80% had children under the age of 18 living with them, 58.30% were married couples living together, 8.60% had a female householder with no husband present, and 28.20% were non-families. 22.70% of all households were made up of individuals, and 11.40% had someone living alone who was 65 years of age or older. The average household size was 2.51 and the average family size was 2.91.

In the county, the population was spread out, with 22.10% under the age of 18, 7.60% from 18 to 24, 27.00% from 25 to 44, 24.50% from 45 to 64, and 18.80% who were 65 years of age or older. The median age was 40 years. For every 100 females, there were 121.50 males. For every 100 females age 18 and over, there were 125.40 males.

The median income for a household in the county was $30,774, and the median income for a family was $34,223. Males had a median income of $29,196 versus $20,987 for females. The per capita income for the county was $15,338. About 10.70% of families and 15.20% of the population were below the poverty line, including 18.20% of those under age 18 and 11.20% of those age 65 or over.

== Education ==
- Moore Haven Elementary School
- Moore Haven Junior Senior High School
- West Glades School, Muse
- Pemayetv Emahakv Charter School, Brighton Seminole Reservation

== Politics ==
United States presidential election results for Glades County, Florida
| Year | Republican | | Democratic | | Third party(ies) | |
| Year | No. | % | No. | % | No. | % |
|---|---|---|---|---|---|---|
| 1924 | 83 | 23.92% | 212 | 61.10% | 52 | 14.99% |
| 1928 | 331 | 53.73% | 281 | 45.62% | 4 | 0.65% |
| 1932 | 148 | 21.89% | 528 | 78.11% | 0 | 0.00% |
| 1936 | 235 | 31.00% | 523 | 69.00% | 0 | 0.00% |
| 1940 | 180 | 27.95% | 464 | 72.05% | 0 | 0.00% |
| 1944 | 164 | 30.54% | 373 | 69.46% | 0 | 0.00% |
| 1948 | 150 | 27.03% | 274 | 49.37% | 131 | 23.60% |
| 1952 | 264 | 39.70% | 401 | 60.30% | 0 | 0.00% |
| 1956 | 309 | 47.69% | 339 | 52.31% | 0 | 0.00% |
| 1960 | 314 | 44.35% | 394 | 55.65% | 0 | 0.00% |
| 1964 | 541 | 55.09% | 441 | 44.91% | 0 | 0.00% |
| 1968 | 261 | 23.92% | 230 | 21.08% | 600 | 55.00% |
| 1972 | 1,019 | 78.81% | 253 | 19.57% | 21 | 1.62% |
| 1976 | 624 | 31.76% | 1,311 | 66.72% | 30 | 1.53% |
| 1980 | 1,098 | 45.96% | 1,203 | 50.36% | 88 | 3.68% |
| 1984 | 1,987 | 65.00% | 1,070 | 35.00% | 0 | 0.00% |
| 1988 | 1,547 | 59.66% | 1,034 | 39.88% | 12 | 0.46% |
| 1992 | 1,185 | 35.12% | 1,305 | 38.68% | 884 | 26.20% |
| 1996 | 1,361 | 39.67% | 1,530 | 44.59% | 540 | 15.74% |
| 2000 | 1,841 | 54.71% | 1,442 | 42.85% | 82 | 2.44% |
| 2004 | 2,443 | 58.33% | 1,718 | 41.02% | 27 | 0.64% |
| 2008 | 2,533 | 59.45% | 1,674 | 39.29% | 54 | 1.27% |
| 2012 | 2,344 | 58.54% | 1,603 | 40.03% | 57 | 1.42% |
| 2016 | 2,996 | 68.37% | 1,271 | 29.01% | 115 | 2.62% |
| 2020 | 3,782 | 72.69% | 1,385 | 26.62% | 36 | 0.69% |
| 2024 | 4,034 | 76.11% | 1,222 | 23.06% | 44 | 0.83% |

United States Senate election results for Glades County, Florida1
| Year | Republican | | Democratic | | Third party(ies) | |
| Year | No. | % | No. | % | No. | % |
|---|---|---|---|---|---|---|
| 2024 | 3,987 | 76.06% | 1,161 | 22.15% | 94 | 1.79% |

United States Senate election results for Glades County, Florida3
| Year | Republican | | Democratic | | Third party(ies) | |
| Year | No. | % | No. | % | No. | % |
|---|---|---|---|---|---|---|
| 2022 | 3,026 | 79.26% | 764 | 20.01% | 28 | 0.73% |

Florida Gubernatorial election results for Glades County
| Year | Republican | | Democratic | | Third party(ies) | |
| Year | No. | % | No. | % | No. | % |
|---|---|---|---|---|---|---|
| 2022 | 3,091 | 80.73% | 721 | 18.83% | 17 | 0.44% |

=== Voter registration ===
According to the Secretary of State's office, Republicans are a majority of registered voters in Glades County.

Glades County Voter Registration & Party Enrollment as of July 31, 2022
| Political Party | Total Voters | Percentage |
|---|---|---|
| Republican | 3,506 | 50.88% |
| Democratic | 1,959 | 28.43% |
| No party affiliation | 1,303 | 18.91% |
| Minor parties | 122 | 1.77% |
| Total | 6,890 | 100.00% |

== Energy and environment ==
Florida Public Service Commission voted unanimously to deny a request by Florida Power and Light to build a huge coal-fired power plant in Glades County, that was to be located several miles to the west of Lake Okeechobee. The Glades County Commission also allowed the construction in 2007 of a 200-acre (0.81 km^{2}) landfill on the southwest shore of Lake Okeechobee.

== Libraries ==
Glades County is part of the Heartland Library Cooperative which serves Glades County and some of the surrounding counties, including Okeechobee, Highlands, Hardee, and DeSoto. Of the system's seven branches, the Moore Haven branch is the only one located in Glades County.

== Communities ==
=== Indian reservation ===
- Brighton Seminole Indian Reservation

=== County Seat ===
- Moore Haven

=== Census-designated places ===
- Buckhead Ridge
- Port LaBelle (part)

=== Other unincorporated communities ===
- Lakeport
- Muse
- Palmdale
- Ortona

== See also ==
- Florida Heartland
- National Register of Historic Places listings in Glades County, Florida
