= National Register of Historic Places listings in Madison County, Florida =

Location of Madison County in Florida

This is a list of the National Register of Historic Places listings in Madison County, Florida.

This is intended to be a complete list of the properties on the National Register of Historic Places in Madison County, Florida, United States. The locations of National Register properties for which the latitude and longitude coordinates are included below, may be seen in a map.

There are 9 properties listed on the National Register in the county.

This National Park Service list is complete through NPS recent listings posted June 26, 2026.

Contents: Counties in Florida (non-linked contain no National Register listings)
Alachua - Baker - Bay - Bradford - Brevard - Broward - Calhoun - Charlotte - Citrus - Clay - Collier - Columbia - DeSoto - Dixie - Duval - Escambia - Flagler - Franklin - Gadsden - Gilchrist - Glades - Gulf - Hamilton - Hardee - Hendry - Hernando - Highlands - Hillsborough (Tampa) - Holmes - Indian River - Jackson - Jefferson - Lafayette - Lake - Lee - Leon - Levy - Liberty - Madison - Manatee - Marion - Martin - Miami-Dade (Miami) - Monroe - Nassau - Okaloosa - Okeechobee - Orange - Osceola - Palm Beach - Pasco - Pinellas - Polk - Putnam - St. Johns - St. Lucie - Santa Rosa - Sarasota - Seminole - Sumter - Suwannee - Taylor - Union - Volusia - Wakulla - Walton - Washington

== Current listings ==
	Name on the Register	Image	Date listed	Location	City or town	Description
1	Bishop-Andrews Hotel	Bishop-Andrews Hotel	June 28, 1990 (#90001002)	109 Redding Street; 30°28′08″N 83°37′49″W	Greenville	
2	W.T. Davis Building	W.T. Davis Building	March 17, 2015 (#15000074)	200 SE. Range Ave. 30°28′05″N 83°24′47″W	Madison	
3	Dial-Goza House	Dial-Goza House	July 24, 1973 (#73000585)	105 Northeast Marion Street; 30°28′13″N 83°24′46″W	Madison	
4	First Baptist Church	First Baptist Church	November 14, 1978 (#78000953)	Pickney and Orange Streets; 30°28′06″N 83°25′05″W	Madison	
5	Jordan-Beggs House	Jordan-Beggs House	June 13, 1997 (#97000557)	211 North Washington Street; 30°28′14″N 83°24′56″W	Madison	
6	Madison County Training School		July 7, 2024 (#100010496)	1268 SW Martin Luther King Drive; 30°27′35″N 83°25′46″W	Madison	Part of the Florida's Historic Black Public Schools MPS
7	St. Mary's Episcopal Church	St. Mary's Episcopal Church	April 28, 1997 (#97000351)	108 Northwest Horry Street; 30°28′11″N 83°24′50″W	Madison	Part of the Florida's Carpenter Gothic Churches MPS
8	Dr. Chandler Holmes Smith House	Dr. Chandler Holmes Smith House	March 26, 1998 (#98000263)	302 North Range Street; 30°28′13″N 83°24′48″W	Madison	
9	Wardlaw-Smith House	Wardlaw-Smith House	June 30, 1972 (#72000339)	103 North Washington Street; 30°28′11″N 83°24′55″W	Madison	

== See also ==
- List of National Historic Landmarks in Florida
- National Register of Historic Places listings in Florida
