= National Register of Historic Places listings in Glades County, Florida =

Location of Glades County in Florida

This is a list of the National Register of Historic Places listings in Glades County, Florida.

This is intended to be a complete list of the properties and districts on the National Register of Historic Places in Glades County, Florida, United States. The locations of National Register properties and districts for which the latitude and longitude coordinates are included below, may be seen in a map.

There are 3 properties and districts listed on the National Register in the county.

This National Park Service list is complete through NPS recent listings posted March 21, 2025.

Contents: Counties in Florida (non-linked contain no National Register listings)
Alachua - Baker - Bay - Bradford - Brevard - Broward - Calhoun - Charlotte - Citrus - Clay - Collier - Columbia - DeSoto - Dixie - Duval - Escambia - Flagler - Franklin - Gadsden - Gilchrist - Glades - Gulf - Hamilton - Hardee - Hendry - Hernando - Highlands - Hillsborough (Tampa) - Holmes - Indian River - Jackson - Jefferson - Lafayette - Lake - Lee - Leon - Levy - Liberty - Madison - Manatee - Marion - Martin - Miami-Dade (Miami) - Monroe - Nassau - Okaloosa - Okeechobee - Orange - Osceola - Palm Beach - Pasco - Pinellas - Polk - Putnam - St. Johns - St. Lucie - Santa Rosa - Sarasota - Seminole - Sumter - Suwannee - Taylor - Union - Volusia - Wakulla - Walton - Washington

== Current listings ==
	Name on the Register	Image	Date listed	Location	City or town	Description
1	Moore Haven Downtown Historic District	Moore Haven Downtown Historic District	October 12, 1995 (#95001166)	3-99 Avenue J., 100 First Street, and Lone Cypress Park; 26°49′57″N 81°05′26″W	Moore Haven	
2	Moore Haven Residential Historic District	Moore Haven Residential Historic District	June 26, 1998 (#98000714)	Roughly bounded by Avenue J to Avenue M and 1st to 5th Streets; 26°49′51″N 81°05′41″W	Moore Haven	
3	Red Barn	Red Barn	December 24, 2008 (#08001243)	3 miles west of County Road 721 on County Road 721A; 27°04′25″N 81°06′50″W	Okeechobee	

== See also ==
- List of National Historic Landmarks in Florida
- National Register of Historic Places listings in Florida
