= Jordan House =

Jordan House or Jordan Farm may refer to:

- Henry-Jordan House, Guntersville, Alabama, listed on the NRHP in Marshall County, Alabama
- Jordan Ranch, Sedona, Arizona, listed on the NRHP in Coconino County, Arizona
- Jordan House (Laguna Beach, California), designed by architect John Lautner
- Orin Jordan House, Whittier, California, NRHP-listed
- Rufus P. Jordan House, Longboat Key, Florida, NRHP-listed
- Jordan-Beggs House, Madison, Florida, NRHP-listed
- Jordan-Bellew House, Monticello, Georgia, listed on the NRHP in Jasper County, Georgia
- Campbell-Jordan House, Washington, Georgia, listed on the NRHP in Wilkes County, Georgia
- Jordan House (West Des Moines, Iowa), listed on the NRHP in Polk County, Iowa
- Charles A. Jordan House, Auburn, Maine, NRHP-listed
- Dr. Charles Jordan House, Wakefield, Maine, NRHP-listed
- Jordan House (Carthage, Mississippi), listed on the NRHP in Leake County, Mississippi
- Charles R. Jordan House, West Point, Mississippi, listed on the NRHP in Clay County, Mississippi
- Moses Jordan House, West Point, Mississippi, listed on the NRHP in Clay County, Mississippi
- Dr. Abram Jordan House, Claverack, New York, NRHP-listed
- Dr. Arch Jordan House, Caldwell, North Carolina, listed on the NRHP in Orange County, North Carolina
- Marion Jasper Jordan Farm, Gulf, North Carolina, listed on the NRHP in Chatham County, North Carolina
- Bowen-Jordan Farm, Siler City, North Carolina, listed on the NRHP in Chatham County, North Carolina
- Jordan House (Windsor, North Carolina), listed on the NRHP in Bertie County, North Carolina
- William B. Jordan Farm, Eagleville, Tennessee, listed on the NRHP in Rutherford County, Tennessee
- Jordan-Williams House, Nolensville, Tennessee, listed on the NRHP in Williamson County, Tennessee
- Newton Jordan House, Triune, Tennessee, listed on the NRHP in Williamson County, Tennessee
- Jordan-Koch House, Victoria, Texas, listed on the NRHP in Victoria County, Texas
- Joseph Jordan House, Raynor, Virginia, listed on the NRHP in Isle of Wight County, Virginia

== See also ==
- Jordan House Hotel Ltd v Menow, a landmark Supreme Court of Canada case on liability of establishments serving alcohol
