= Grosskopf =

Grosskopf or Großkopf is a German and Yiddish surname, derived from the nickname literally meaning "big head". Notable people with the surname include:

- Harald Grosskopf (born 1949), German musician
- John Grosskopf, American academic
- Jörn Großkopf (born 1966), German football player and manager
- Markus Grosskopf (born 1965), German musician and songwriter
- Michelle Groskopf, Canadian photographer
- Ofer Grosskopf (born 1969), Israeli judge
- Shawna Grosskopf (born 1950), American economist
