= Red Barn =

Red Barn may refer to:

== Events ==
- Red Barn Murder, a notorious 1827 crime committed in England

== Places ==
- Red Barn Gallery, a photography exhibition space in Belfast, Northern Ireland
- Red Barn (Okeechobee, Florida), a historic structure in the United States
- Red Barn Observatory, a facility for observing celestial objects located in Georgia, United States
- Red Barn (restaurant), a fast-food chain founded in the United States in 1961
- A nickname for the original manufacturing plant of Boeing in Washington, United States, now part of the Museum of Flight
- A nickname for Earnest Andersson's birthplace in Burr Oak, Iowa

== Businesses ==
- Red Barn stall mats
- RedBarn pet products

== See also ==
- Red Barnes
