= North Florida (disambiguation) =

North Florida is a region of the U.S. state of Florida

North Florida may also refer to:

- University of North Florida in Jacksonville, Florida
- North Florida Ospreys, that university's athletics program
- North Florida Community College in Madison, Florida
