= Mamie Langdale Memorial Bridge =

Bridge in Moore Haven, Florida

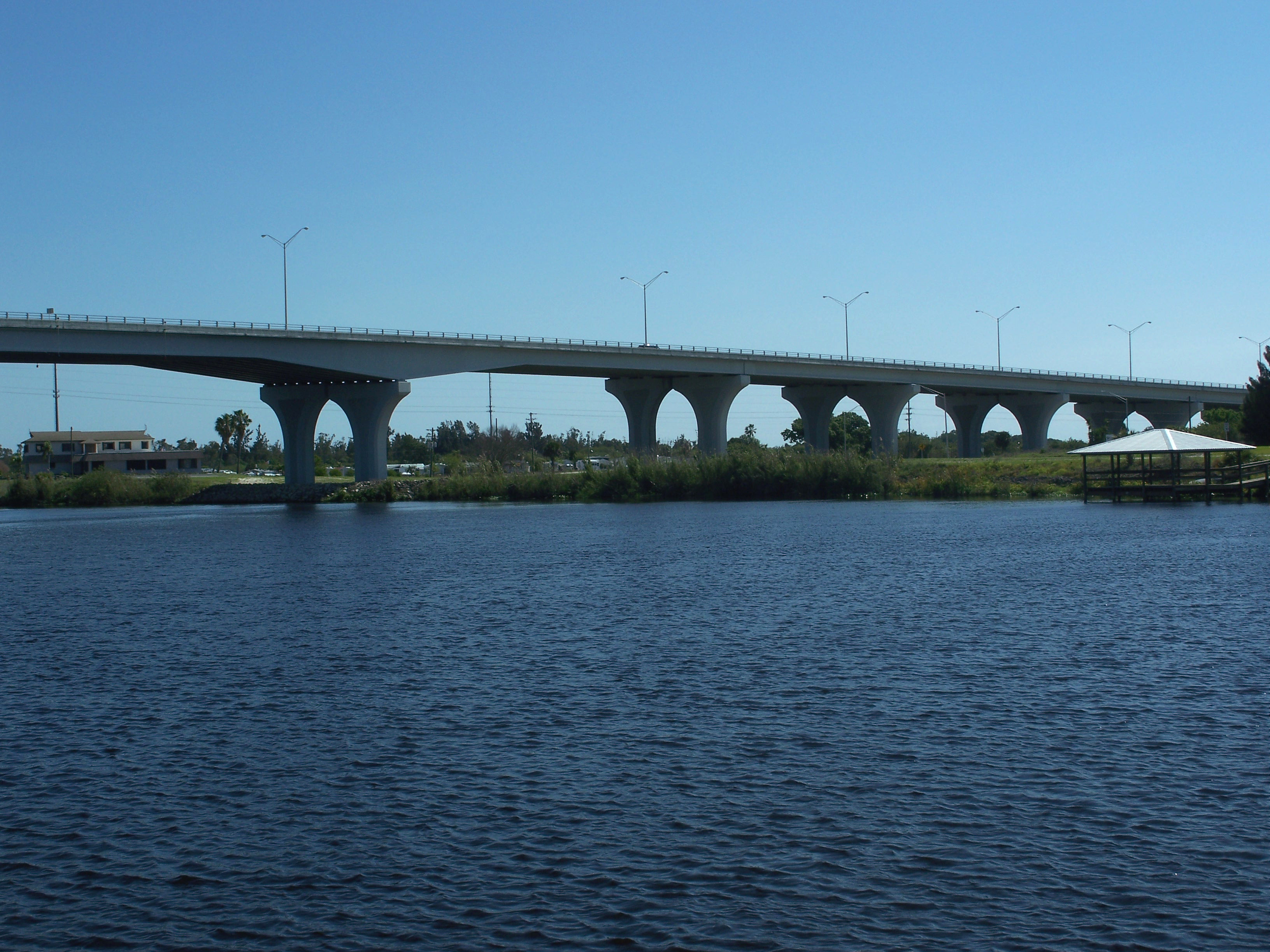
- Coordinates: 26°49′59″N 81°05′19″W
- Carries: US 27
- Crosses: Caloosahatchee Canal
- Locale: Moore Haven, Florida
- Official name: Mamie Langdale Memorial Bridge
- Maintained by: Florida Department of Transportation

Characteristics
- Design: concrete girder bridge
- Total length: 2,281 ft (695 m)
- Clearance below: 55 ft (17 m)

History
- Opened: Previous bridge 1954; Current bridge 1999

Statistics
- Toll: None

Location
- Interactive map of Mamie Langdale Memorial Bridge

The Mamie Langdale Memorial Bridge is a bridge carrying U.S. Highway 27 (US 27) over the Caloosahatchee Canal in Moore Haven, Florida. The bridge was built in 1999 and it is 55 feet (17 m) tall. The bridge's primary span over the canal is a 320-foot (98 m) spliced concrete girder span. It was the longest spliced concrete girder span in the country at the time. The bridge is named for Mamie Langdale, one of the former bridge tenders of the previous drawbridge at the site who passed away in 1973.

== History ==
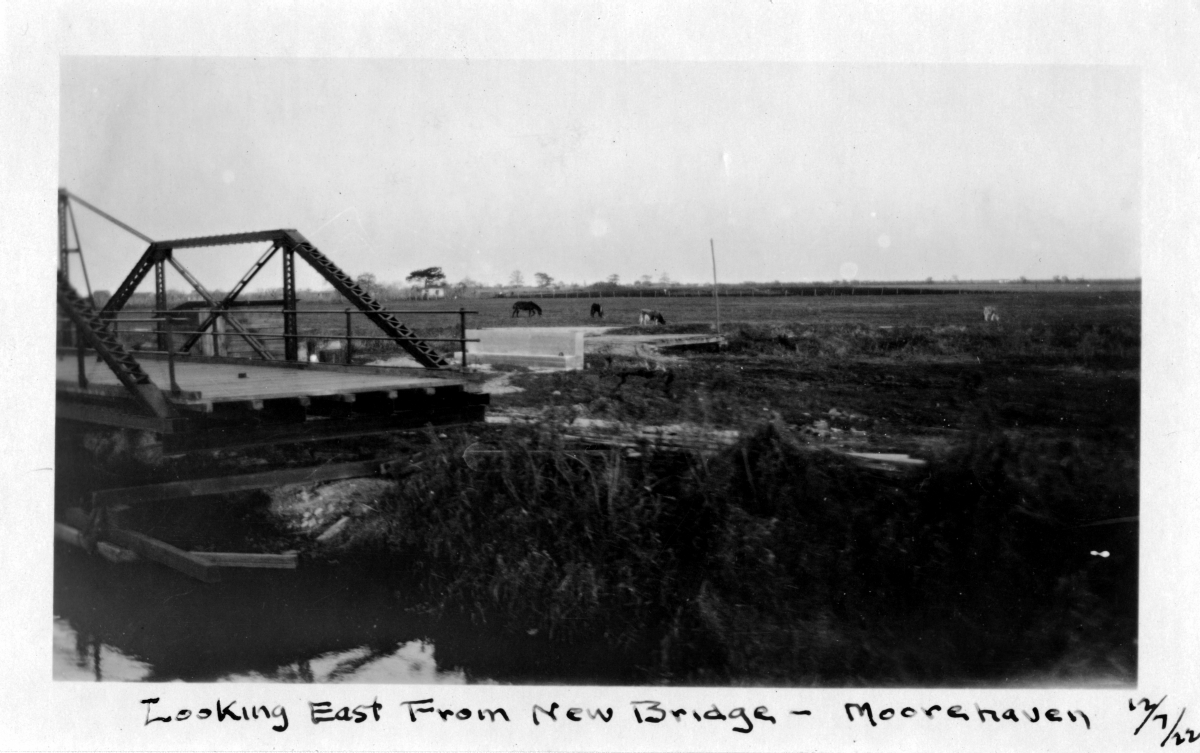
Original 1922 swing bridge in Moore Haven, Florida

The Mamie Langdale Memorial Bridge is the third bridge to cross the Caloosahatchee Canal (also known historically as the Three Mile Canal) in Moore Haven.

The first bridge was a small swing bridge built around 1922. This swing bridge was located just southwest of the current bridge connecting 1st Street in the Moore Haven Downtown Historic District with what is now "Old 27" on the south side. The swing bridge carried State Road 67 (SR 67) through Moore Haven. SR 67 was redesignated SR 25 after the 1945 Florida State Road renumbering. In 1948, the route became US 27 (with SR 25 as a hidden designation) when that designation was extended from Tallahassee to Miami.

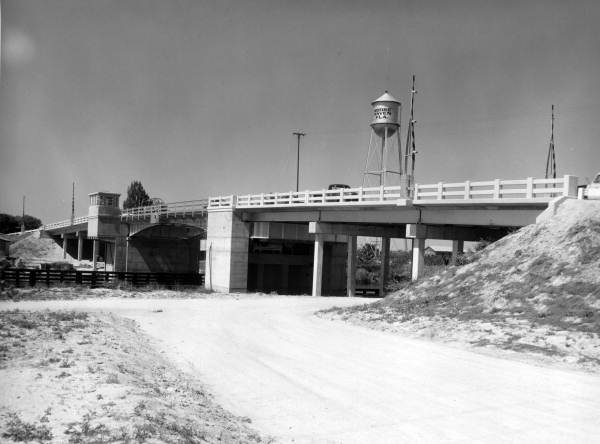
1954 Drawbridge over the Caloosahatchee Canal

The swing bridge was replaced with a concrete drawbridge in 1954. The drawbridge was built at the site of the current bridge and US 27 was rerouted on to its current alignment through Moore Haven at the time.

The current bridge opened in 1999. The west half opened first carrying one lane in each direction. The rest of the bridge was completed after the demolition of the drawbridge.
