= Morris G. Steen Jr. =

President of North Florida Community College
- In office 2002–2008
- Preceded by: Dr. Beverly M. Grissom
- Succeeded by: John Grosskopf

Personal details
- Spouse: Judy Gilliam
- Education: University of Florida; George Washington

Morris G. Steen Jr. is an American academic, and the former President of North Florida Community College. Steen graduated with his bachelor's degree in Agricultural Economics from the University of Florida in 1965. He received his master's degree from George Washington University in Administration in 1977. In addition he completed an Academic Leadership Program at the University of Florida in 1999. In 2002 he was selected to be President of North Florida Community College. Prior to this position, Steen served in the United States Navy, where he earned the rank of captain.

== See also ==
- North Florida Community College
- Florida Community Colleges System
