= Moore Haven Residential Historic District =

Historic district in Florida, United States

- U.S. National Register of Historic Places
- U.S. Historic district
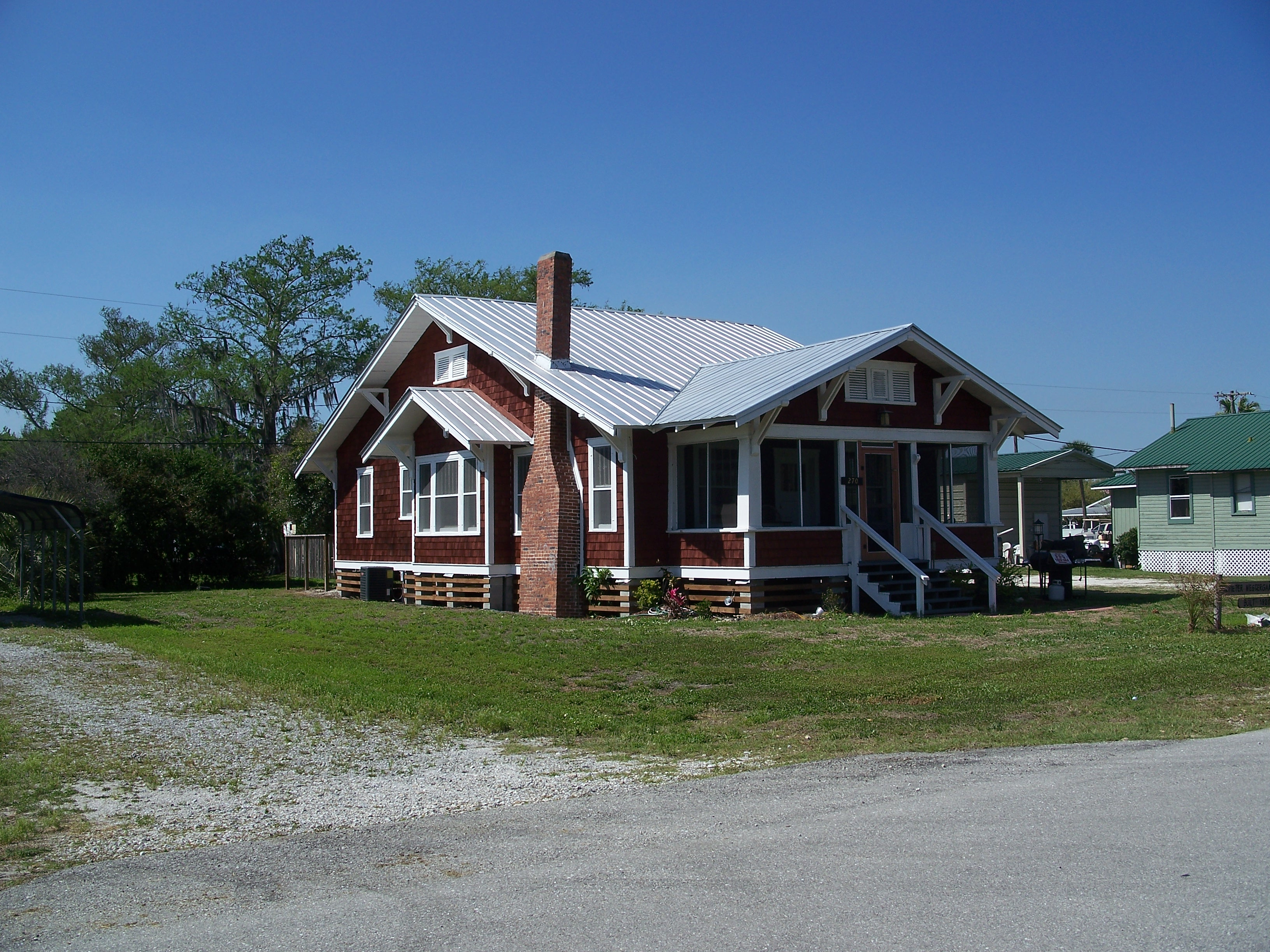

- Location within Florida Location within the United States
- Location: Roughly bounded by Ave. J to Ave. M and 1st to 5th Sts., Moore Haven, Florida
- Coordinates: 26°49′51″N 81°5′41″W
- Area: 8 acres (3.2 ha)
- Built: 1930
- Architect: Marion F. George,
- Architectural style: Late Victorian, Late 19th And Early 20th Century American Movements
- NRHP reference No.: 98000714
- Added to NRHP: June 26, 1998

The Moore Haven Residential Historic District is a U.S. historic district (designated as such on June 26, 1998) located in Moore Haven, Florida. The district is bounded by Avenue J to Avenue M and 1st to 5th Streets. It contains 40 historic buildings.
