= John Grosskopf =

President of North Florida College
- In office 2009–2025
- Preceded by: Morris G. Steen, Jr.
- Succeeded by: Jennifer H. Page

Personal details
- Born: Hialeah, Florida
- Spouse: Patricia
- Education: Florida International University (B.A.); Florida State University (M.A.)

John Grosskopf is an American academic administrator. Since 2009, Grosskopf has served as president of North Florida College (formerly North Florida Community College).

== Biography ==
Grosskopf graduated with his bachelor's degree in English from Florida International University. He received his master's degree and did Doctoral course work in English at Florida State University.

Prior to becoming president of North Florida College, he served as the college's vice president of academic affairs and chief academic officer. As president of North Florida College, he has worked with the Madison County Chamber of Commerce to help students find jobs.

== See also ==
- North Florida College
- Florida Community Colleges System
