= Chalo Nitka =

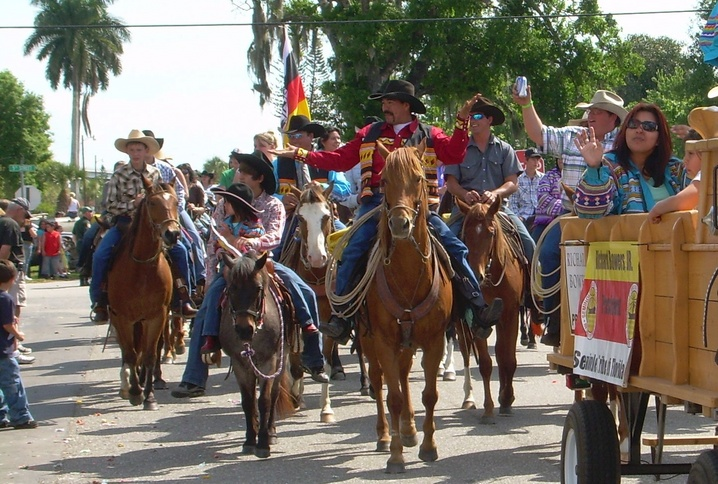
Chalo Nitka Parade

Chalo Nitka Festival and Frontier Days are the county fair of Glades County, Florida. The Festival and parade is held on the first Saturday every March. The festival spans a week with the livestock shows and sale during the week leading up to the main Festival weekend Festivities, which now include rodeos, dances, carnival rides, and arts and crafts for sale during the festival weekend. The event has evolved to culminate in showcasing the southern hospitality of Glades County and the history of the local Seminole people.

== History ==
Chalo Nitka is one of Florida's oldest continuous festivals, dating back to 1948 when the celebration was inaugurated to commemorate the completion of the paving of Main Street (now called Avenue J) in the town of Moore Haven. Chalo Nitka means "Day of the Big Bass" in the Miccosukee language.
