= Wardlaw–Smith House =

Historic house in Florida, United States

- U.S. National Register of Historic Places
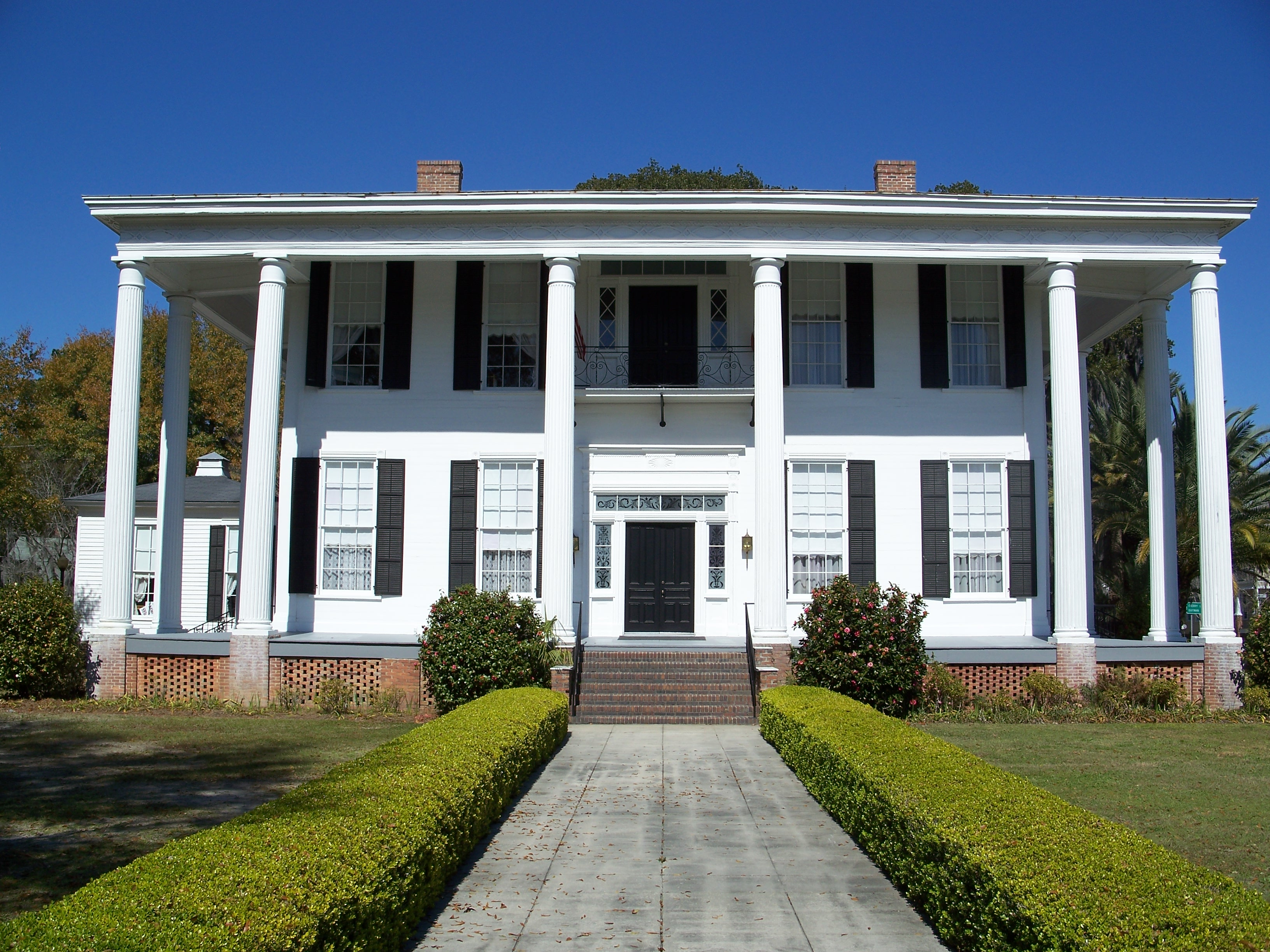

- Location within Florida Location within the United States
- Location: Madison, Florida
- Coordinates: 30°28′11″N 83°24′55″W
- Built: c. 1860
- Architect: William Archer Hammerly
- Architectural style: Classical Revival, Greek Revival
- NRHP reference No.: 72000339
- Added to NRHP: June 30, 1972

The Wardlaw–Smith House (also known as the Smith Mansion) is a U.S. historic building in Madison, Florida. It is located at 103 North Washington Street. On June 30, 1972, it was added to the U.S. National Register of Historic Places. Donated in 1988 to North Florida Community College in 1988; the college uses it as a conference center.
