= Dr. Chandler Holmes Smith House =

Historic house in Florida, United States

- U.S. National Register of Historic Places
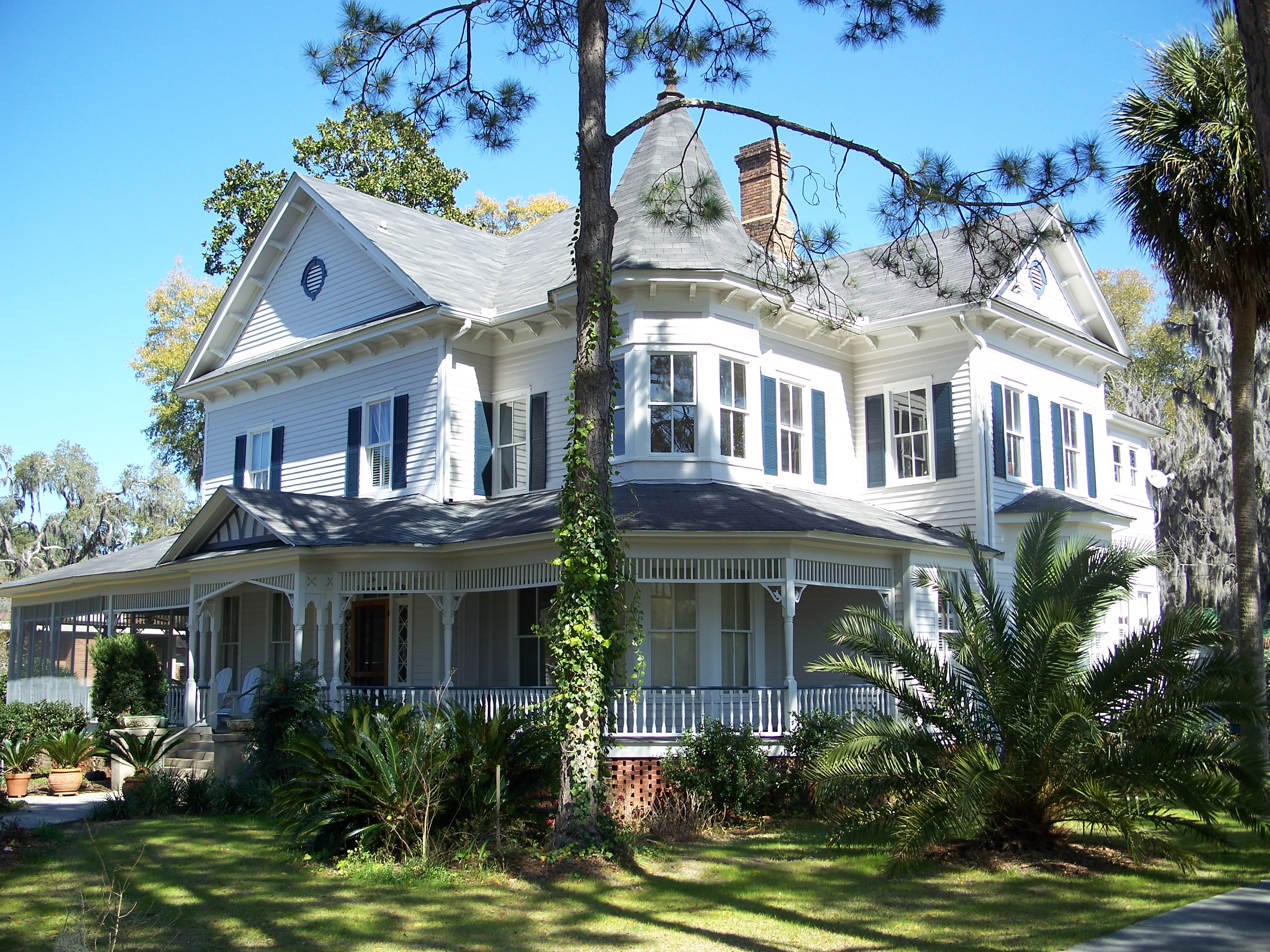

- Location within Florida Location within the United States
- Location: Madison, Florida
- Coordinates: 30°28′13″N 83°24′48″W
- Area: less than one acre
- Architect: William Turner Davis
- Architectural style: Queen Anne
- NRHP reference No.: 98000263
- Added to NRHP: March 26, 1998

The Dr. Chandler Holmes Smith House is a historic house in Madison, Florida, United States. It is located at 302 North Range Street. On March 26, 1998, it was added to the U.S. National Register of Historic Places.
