= Shawna Grosskopf =

American economist (born 1950)

Shawna P. Grosskopf
- Born: February 27, 1950 (age 76); Detroit, Michigan

Academic background
- Education: Syracuse University

Academic work
- Discipline: Public economics
- Institutions: Oregon State University
- Awards: Researcher of the Year Award from the Oregon State University College of Liberal Arts (2002)

Shawna Patricia Grosskopf (born February 27, 1950) is an American economist who is professor emerita at Oregon State University in Corvallis, Oregon, United States, and adjunct professor at the Centre for Environmental and Resource Economics in Umeå, Sweden. She was named one of the 250 most-cited scholars in economics and finance by the ISI Web of Knowledge in 2005. In 2023 at the 17th annual European Workshop on Efficiency and Productivity Analysis (EWEPA), Grosskopf was presented the Lifetime Achievement Award by the International Society for Efficiency and Productivity Analysis (ISEaPA).

== Education ==
Grosskopf has graduated with a Bachelor of Arts from Kalamazoo College, as well as later earning both a Master of Science and Ph.D. from Syracuse University.
