= Joseph Jordan House =

Historic house in Virginia, United States

- U.S. National Register of Historic Places
- Virginia Landmarks Register
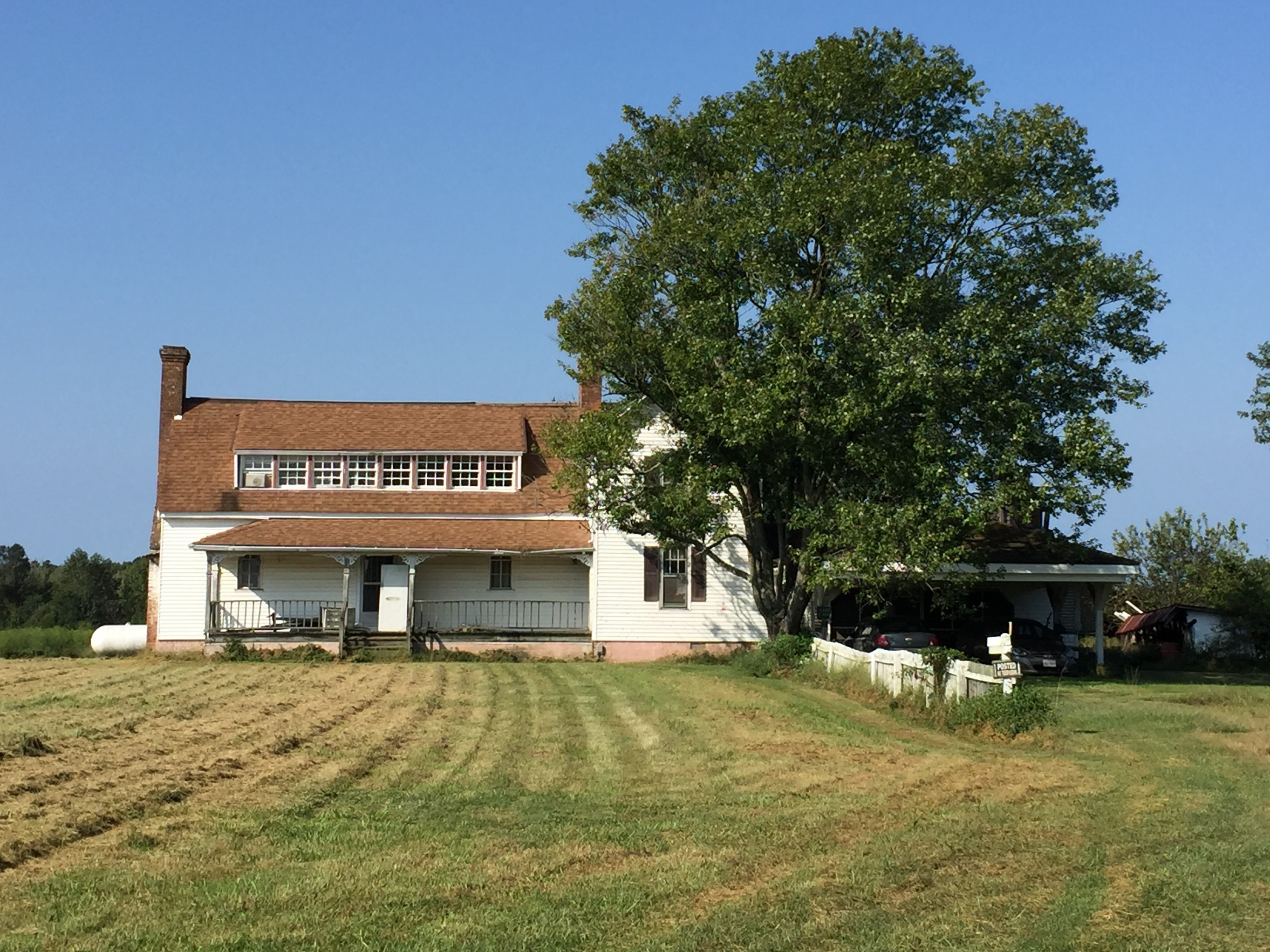
- Front of the Joseph Jordan House, 2018

- Location within Virginia Location within the United States
- Location: Dews Plantation Road, northeast of Raynor, Virginia
- Coordinates: 36°58′16″N 76°45′45″W
- Area: 150 acres (61 ha)
- Built: c. 1795
- NRHP reference No.: 79003046
- VLR No.: 046-0082

Significant dates
- Added to NRHP: June 22, 1979
- Designated VLR: February 26, 1979

Joseph Jordan House, also known as Boykin's Quarter, Jordan's, and Hatty Barlow Moody Farm, is a historic home located near Raynor in Isle of Wight County, Virginia, United States. The original structure was built about 1795, and is a 1 1/2-story, three-bay, frame structure with brick ends. It was later expanded with a two-story, one room, frame addition and a one-bay kitchen ell. The house features clerestory monitors that were probably added about 1820–1840. Also on the property are a variety of contributing outbuildings.

It was listed on the National Register of Historic Places in 1979.
