= W. T. Davis Building =

- W.T. Davis Building
- U.S. National Register of Historic Places
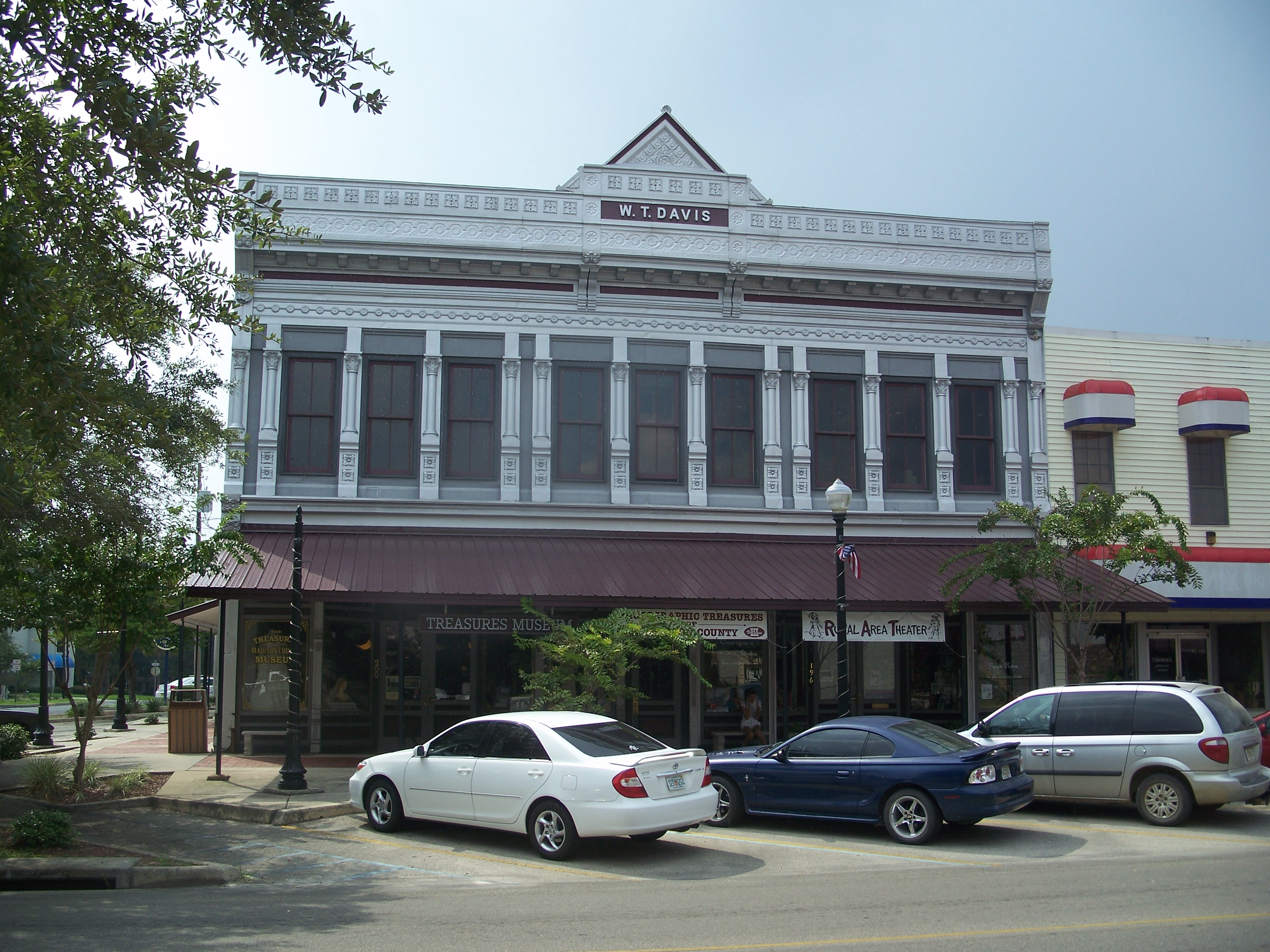

- Location within Florida
- Location: Madison, Florida
- Coordinates: 30.467984°N 83.412979°W
- NRHP reference No.: 15000074
- Added to NRHP: April 17, 2015

The W. T. Davis Building is a historic building located at 200 Southwest Range Avenue in Madison, Madison County, Florida, currently containing the Treasures of Madison County museum. The building has a metal front, one of just three remaining in the state of Florida according to the Treasures of Madison County website.

The building was added to the National Register of Historic Places on March 17, 2015.

== Gallery ==
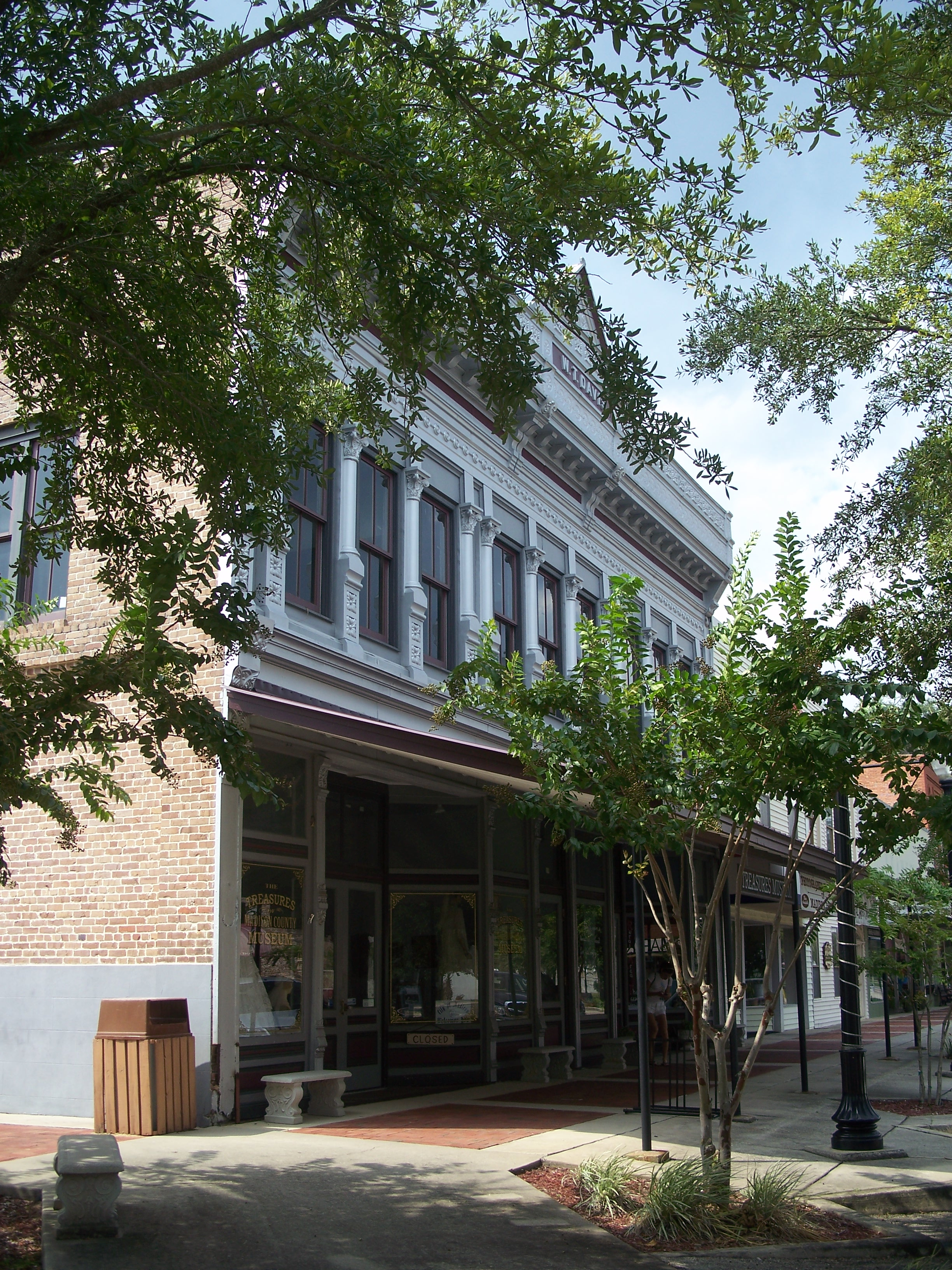
W.T. Davis Building, home of the Museum

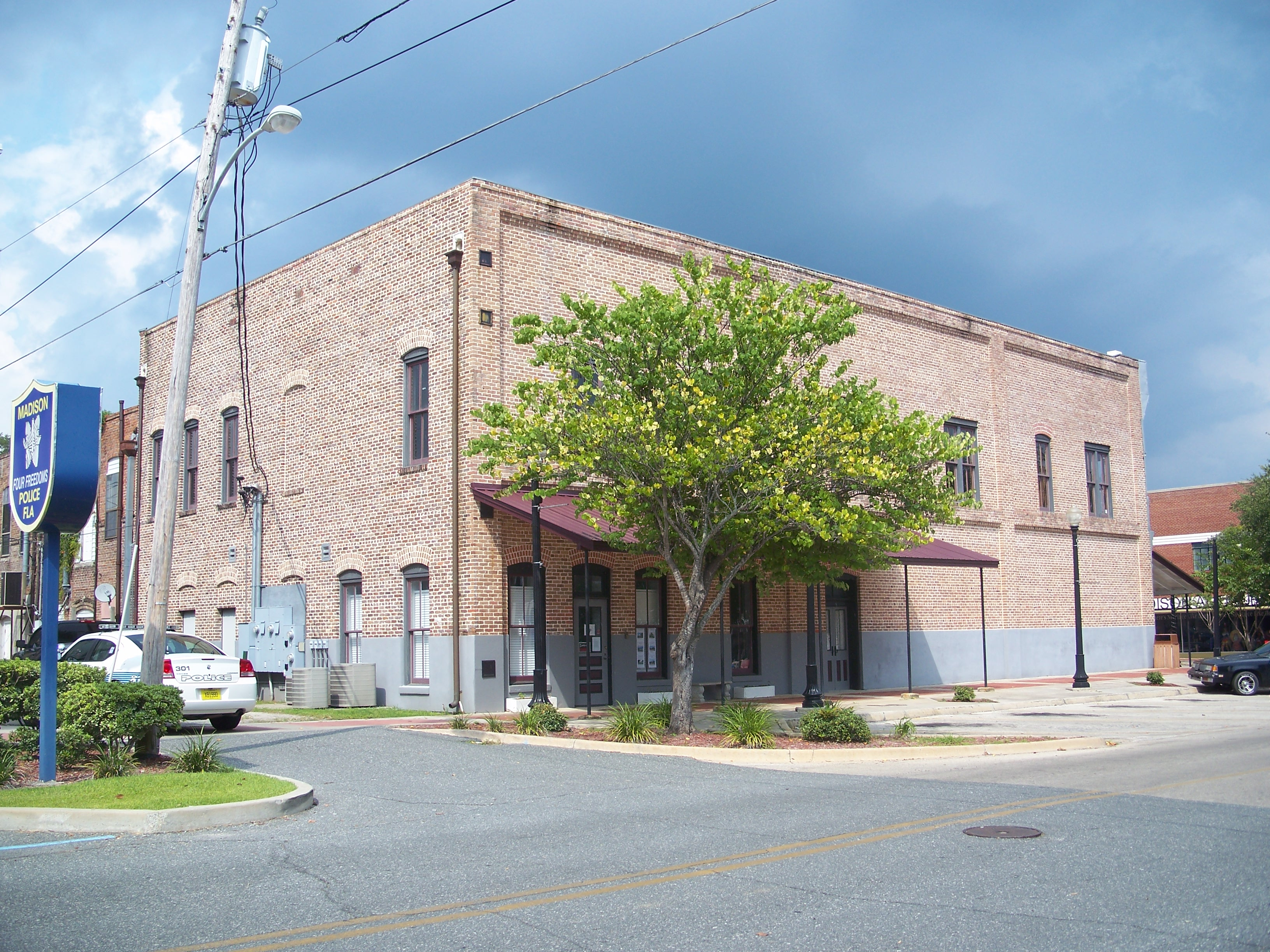
W.T. Davis Building, home of the Museum

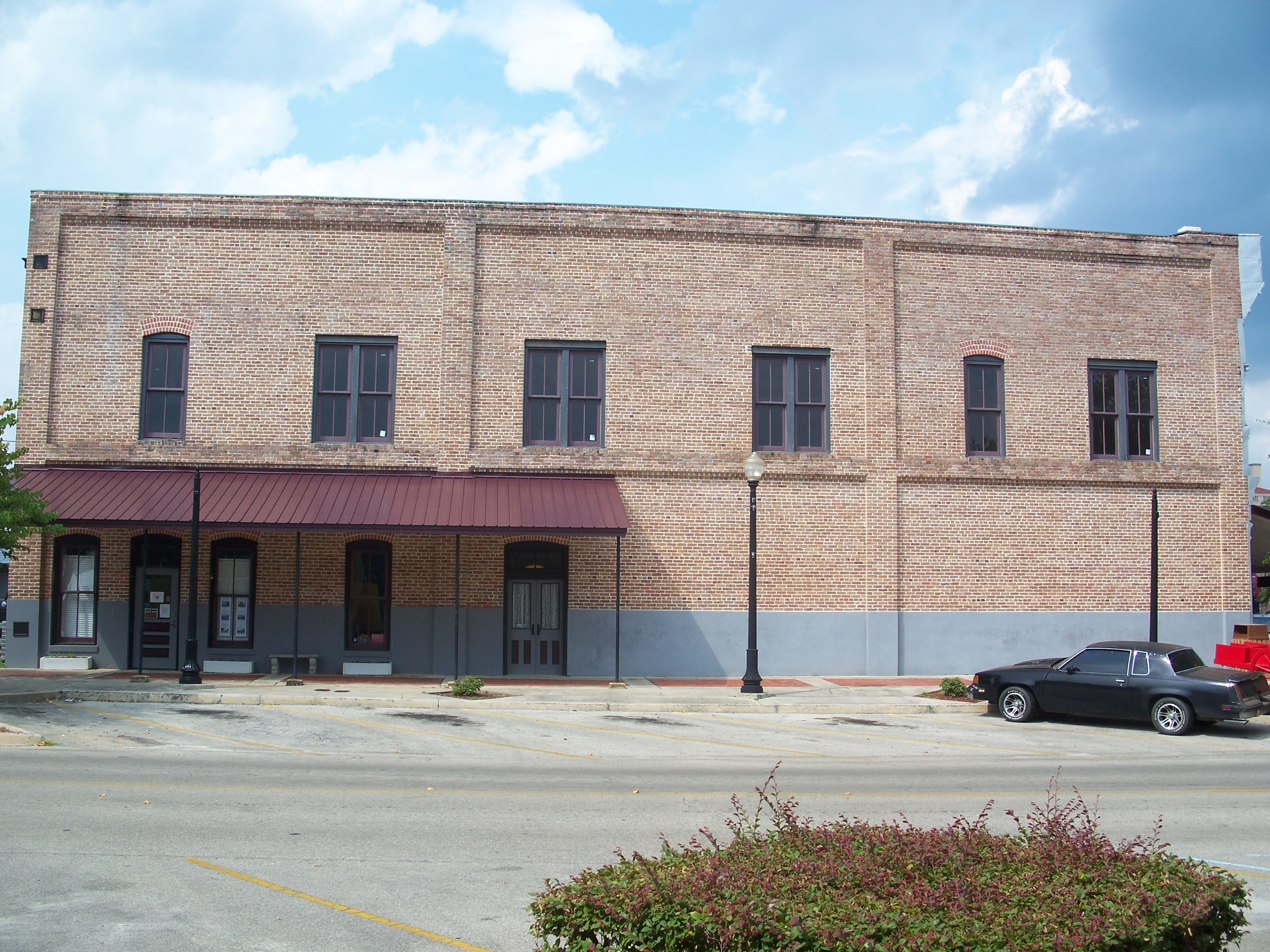
W.T. Davis Building, home of the Museum

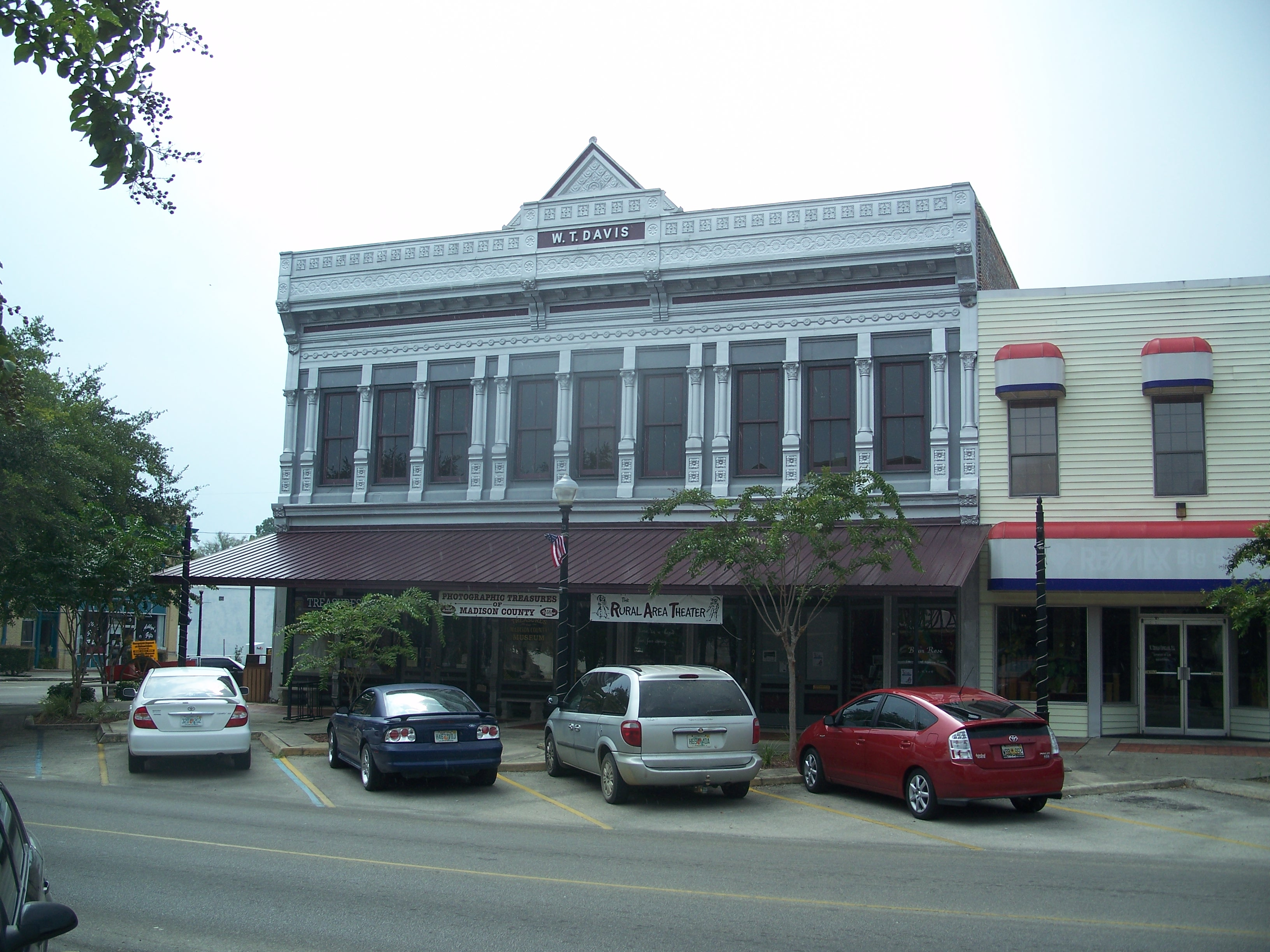
W.T. Davis Building, home of the Museum
