= Moore Haven Downtown Historic District =

Historic district in Florida, United States

- U.S. National Register of Historic Places
- U.S. Historic district
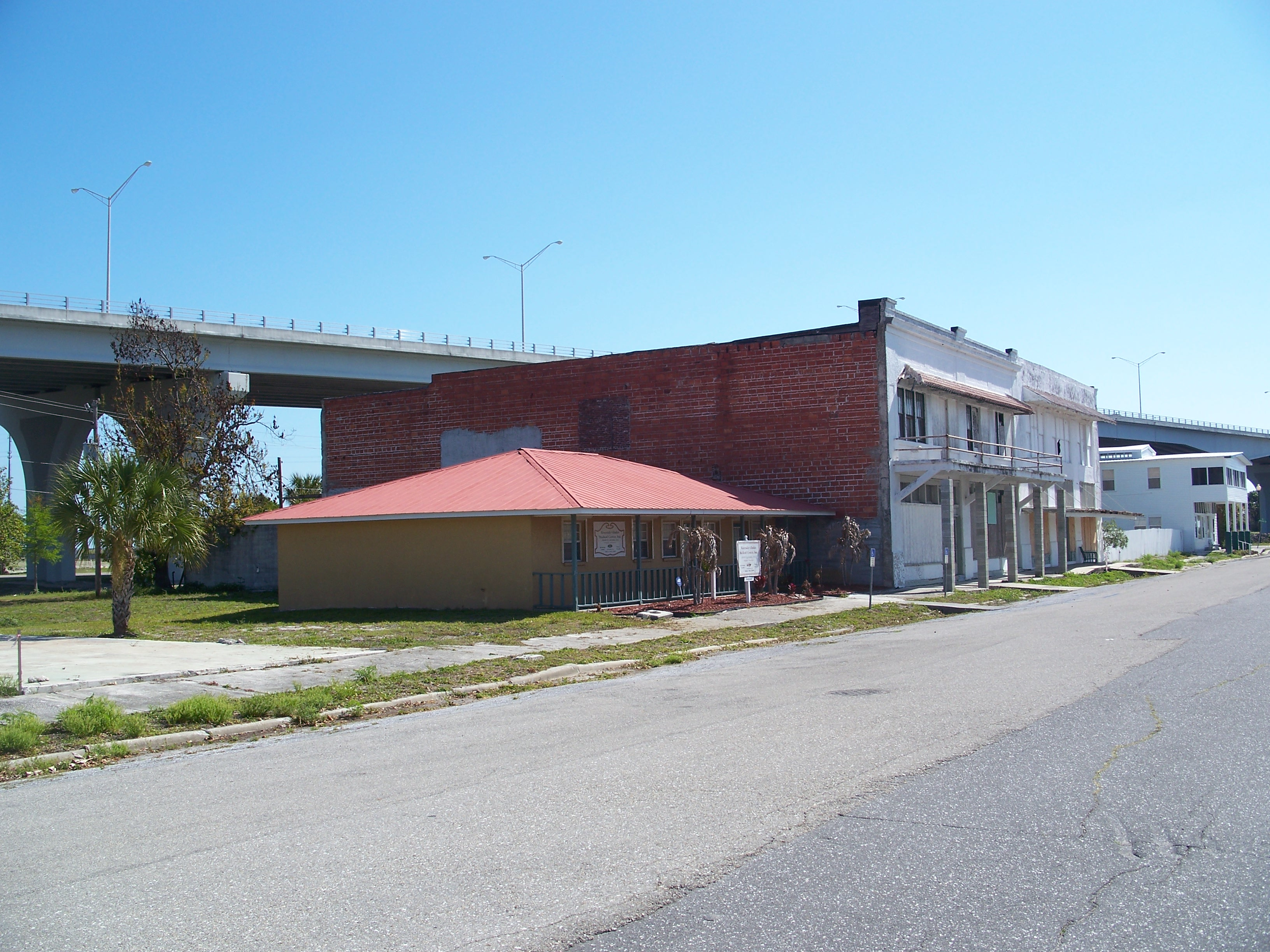

- Location within Florida Location within the United States
- Location: 3-99 Ave. J., 100 First St. and Lone Cypress Park, Moore Haven, Florida
- Coordinates: 26°49′57″N 81°5′26″W
- Area: 2.2 acres (0.89 ha)
- NRHP reference No.: 95001166
- Added to NRHP: October 12, 1995

The Moore Haven Downtown Historic District is a U.S. historic district (designated as such on October 12, 1995) located in Moore Haven, Florida. The district runs from 3 through 99 Avenue J., 100 1st Street and Lone Cypress Park, a park which houses the only cypress tree in the district. It contains 7 historic buildings covering 22 acres.
