= Moore Haven, Florida =

City in Florida, United States

- City
- City of Moore Haven
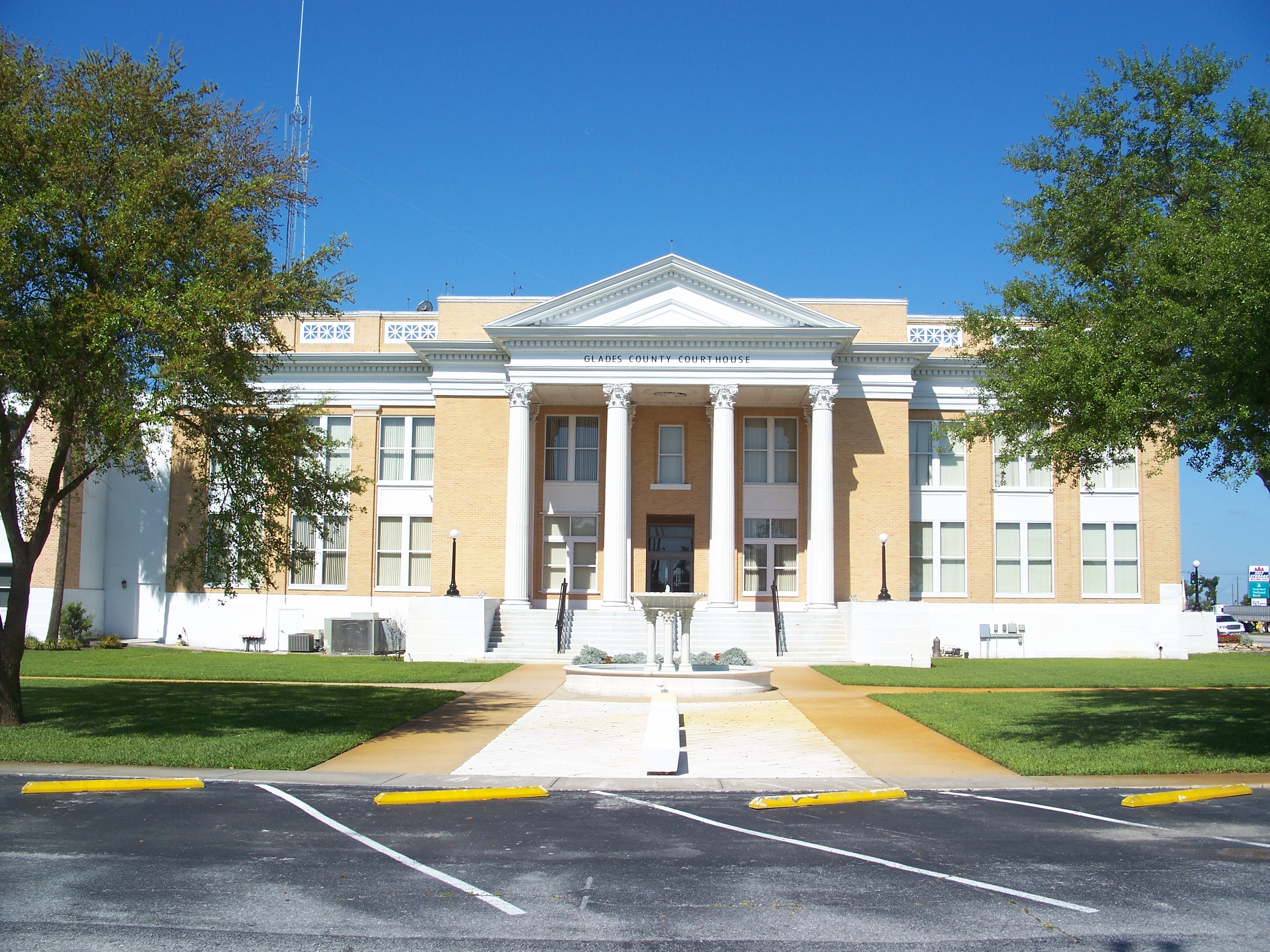
- Glades County Courthouse
- Nickname(s): Hooterville, Little Chicago
- Location in Glades County and the state of Florida
- Coordinates: 26°50′02″N 81°05′54″W
- Country: United States
- State: Florida
- County: Glades
- Founded: 1915
- Incorporated: 1917

Government
  - Type: Council-Manager
  - Mayor: Wayne "Clay" Browning
  - Vice Mayor: Marcus Decker
  - Councilors: RaShondra Croskey, Alisha Beck, and Bradley Smith
  - City Manager: Larry E. Tibbs
  - City Clerk: Ashley Wills

Area
  - Total: 1.07 sq mi (2.76 km^{2})
  - Land: 1.07 sq mi (2.76 km^{2})
  - Water: 0 sq mi (0.00 km^{2})
- Elevation: 13 ft (4.0 m)

Population (2020)
  - Total: 1,566
  - Density: 1,470.0/sq mi (567.57/km^{2})
- Time zone: UTC-5 (Eastern (EST))
  - Summer (DST): UTC-4 (EDT)
- ZIP code: 33471
- Area code: 863
- FIPS code: 12-46550
- GNIS feature ID: 2404296
- Website: https://moorehaven.org/

Moore Haven is a city and the county seat of Glades County, Florida, United States. It is part of the Florida Heartland region. The population was 1,566 at the 2020 census, down from 1,680 at the 2010 census. Moore Haven is located on the southwest shoreline of Lake Okeechobee. It is part of the Clewiston, Florida Micropolitan Statistical Area (μSA).

== History ==
The City of Moore Haven was named after its founder, James A. Moore (1861-1929), a man originally from Seattle, that immediately began platting the community upon his arrival in 1915. Two years later, in 1917, the rapidly growing community was officially incorporated as a municipality. In its early days, Moore Haven was often called "Little Chicago", reflecting the city's status as a significant boom town, as well as it originally being located where Lake Okeechobee and the Caloosahatchee River Canal meet, a lot like how the mouth of the Chicago River intersects into the southern part of Lake Michigan in Chicago.

=== First Woman Mayor of the South ===
In 1917, Marian Newhall Horwitz was elected as, not only the first woman mayor of Moore Haven, or the first woman mayor in Florida, she was additionally, the first female mayor south of the Mason-Dixon line.

Horwitz was described by the Moore Haven Times, in a July 27, 1917 issue, as being "business from head to foot" along with being seen regularly at 5:15 am riding horseback to work. She resigned on June 22, 1918, taking over management of the Desoto Land Company after her second husband, John J. O'Brien, left to serve in World War I, and after her decision to live on the farm, outside the city limits.

After stepping down as mayor, a "grateful citizenry" gave her a silver trophy, which was eventually passed to her son, Dr. Orville Horwitz, as of 1985.

=== Railroad ===
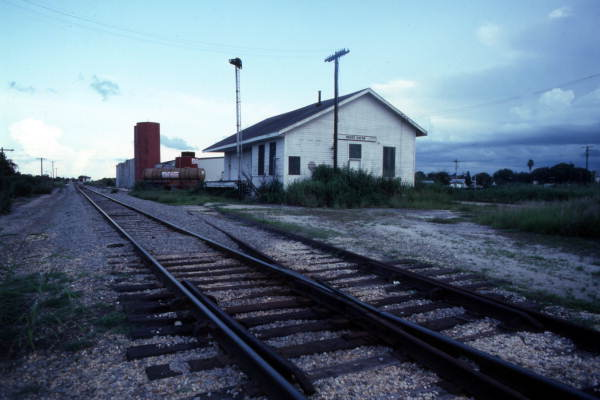
Moore Haven Railroad Depot

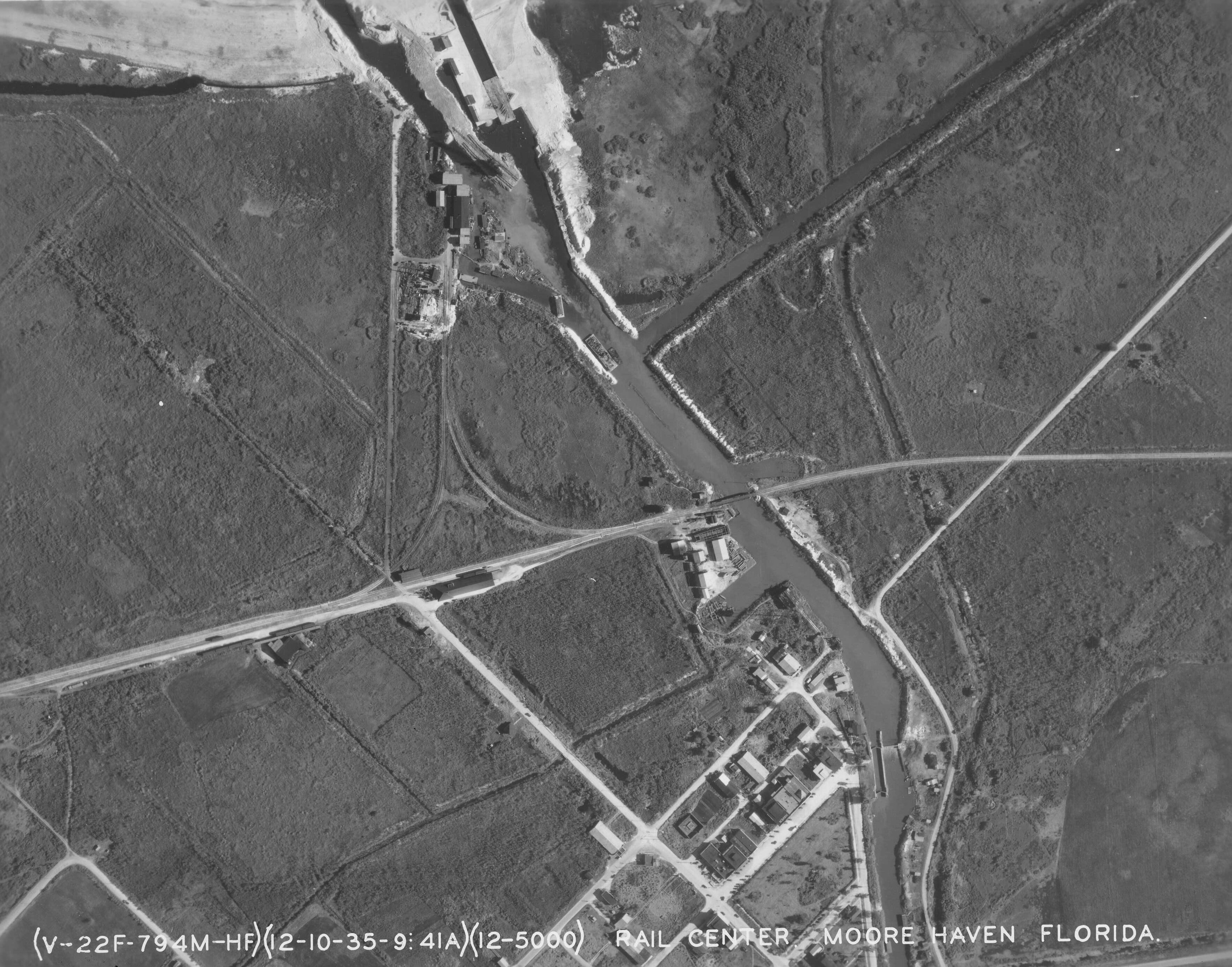
Railroads in Moore Haven, Dec. 1935

Horwitz is credited with bringing the railroad to Moore Haven, while her brother was a business associate of J.P. Morgan, the vice-president of the Atlantic Coastline Railroad.

In 1918, construction of the first extension line was finished, bringing Moore Haven's first train on May 13, 1918. The twenty passengers and fifteen freight cars arrived ninety minutes late. "Late arrivals, unannounced schedule changes, and faulty equipment, as well as derailments, were to plague the railroad from the start." The train was often called the "Hinky Dink" and the "Muck Special." In addition to nicknames, a well-known joke about the train circulated, too, "a middle-aged man, who got off the train at Moore Haven, had left Haines City, as a young boy, in the care of the conductor."

=== Impact of Hurricanes ===
The Great Miami Hurricane of 1926 dramatically altered the landscape of the area. The storm surge from the lake caused widespread death and destruction, sometimes literally relocating houses to the opposite side of the river. The town might have recovered, but it was hit not long after by the 1928 Okeechobee Hurricane. This decimated areas that had escaped damage in 1926.

Today, Moore Haven is a small, sleepy town that has little industry and infrastructure. Moore Haven is home to the Annual Chalo Nitka Festival, which is held the first weekend in March.

There are two access points to the Lake Okeechobee Scenic Trail, which passes through the town and around Lake Okeechobee.

Built in 2000 and crossing across the Caloosahatchee River 900 feet east of First Street, the Mamie Langdale Memorial Bridge breaks the Florida record of being the Longest Concrete I Girder Span, measuring 320 feet. The overall total length of the Prestressed Stringer/Multi-beam bridge equals 2,281 feet.

The Westergaard House, built in 1920, located on 270 Avenue L Southwest, is the headquarters of the Glades County Historical Society.

== Geography ==
According to the United States Census Bureau, the city has a total area of 1.1 square miles (2.8 km^{2}), of which 1.1 square miles (2.8 km^{2}) is land and 0.1 square miles (0.26 km^{2}) (6.09%) is water.

=== Climate ===
Moore Haven has a humid subtropical climate (Köppen Cfa) with some characteristics of a tropical monsoon climate (Am), with a defined rainy season from June through September.

Climate data for Moore Haven, Florida (Moore Haven Lock 1), 1991–2020 normals, extremes 1918–present
Month	Jan	Feb	Mar	Apr	May	Jun	Jul	Aug	Sep	Oct	Nov	Dec	Year
Record high °F (°C)	89 (32)	91 (33)	94 (34)	97 (36)	98 (37)	101 (38)	103 (39)	98 (37)	99 (37)	98 (37)	91 (33)	95 (35)	103 (39)
Mean maximum °F (°C)	83.7 (28.7)	85.8 (29.9)	88.1 (31.2)	91.3 (32.9)	93.9 (34.4)	95.3 (35.2)	95.6 (35.3)	95.5 (35.3)	94.5 (34.7)	91.8 (33.2)	87.3 (30.7)	85.1 (29.5)	96.8 (36.0)
Mean daily maximum °F (°C)	74.3 (23.5)	77.2 (25.1)	80.5 (26.9)	84.9 (29.4)	88.7 (31.5)	90.9 (32.7)	92.1 (33.4)	92.2 (33.4)	90.7 (32.6)	86.3 (30.2)	80.1 (26.7)	76.7 (24.8)	84.6 (29.2)
Daily mean °F (°C)	62.2 (16.8)	64.7 (18.2)	67.5 (19.7)	72.3 (22.4)	76.7 (24.8)	80.2 (26.8)	81.5 (27.5)	82.0 (27.8)	80.9 (27.2)	76.2 (24.6)	69.5 (20.8)	65.2 (18.4)	73.2 (22.9)
Mean daily minimum °F (°C)	50.1 (10.1)	52.2 (11.2)	54.6 (12.6)	59.7 (15.4)	64.6 (18.1)	69.4 (20.8)	71.0 (21.7)	71.7 (22.1)	71.1 (21.7)	66.2 (19.0)	58.9 (14.9)	53.6 (12.0)	61.9 (16.6)
Mean minimum °F (°C)	35.9 (2.2)	39.0 (3.9)	43.3 (6.3)	50.6 (10.3)	59.0 (15.0)	68.2 (20.1)	70.2 (21.2)	70.5 (21.4)	68.9 (20.5)	56.8 (13.8)	47.1 (8.4)	40.6 (4.8)	33.7 (0.9)
Record low °F (°C)	23 (−5)	28 (−2)	25 (−4)	33 (1)	47 (8)	54 (12)	60 (16)	61 (16)	58 (14)	40 (4)	31 (−1)	23 (−5)	23 (−5)
Average precipitation inches (mm)	2.15 (55)	2.02 (51)	2.44 (62)	2.43 (62)	3.73 (95)	8.43 (214)	7.45 (189)	7.87 (200)	5.93 (151)	2.89 (73)	1.52 (39)	1.76 (45)	48.62 (1,235)
Average precipitation days (≥ 0.01 in)	5.8	5.3	5.0	5.6	8.0	15.1	15.0	15.4	13.0	7.6	4.9	5.4	106.1
Source: NOAA

== Demographics ==
Historical population
Census	Pop.	Note	%±
1920	623		—
1930	612		−1.8%
1940	831		35.8%
1950	636		−23.5%
1960	790		24.2%
1970	974		23.3%
1980	1,250		28.3%
1990	1,432		14.6%
2000	1,635		14.2%
2010	1,680		2.8%
2020	1,566		−6.8%
U.S. Decennial Census

=== Racial and ethnic composition ===
Moore Haven racial composition (Hispanics excluded from racial categories) (NH = Non-Hispanic)
Race	Pop 2010	Pop 2020	% 2010	% 2020
White (NH)	659	546	39.23%	34.87%
Black or African American (NH)	407	403	24.23%	25.73%
Native American or Alaska Native (NH)	0	6	0.00%	0.38%
Asian (NH)	3	2	0.18%	0.13%
Pacific Islander or Native Hawaiian (NH)	0	0	0.00%	0.00%
Some other race (NH)	0	4	0.00%	0.26%
Two or more races/Multiracial (NH)	13	31	0.77%	1.98%
Hispanic or Latino (any race)	598	574	35.60%	36.65%
Total	1,680	1,566		

=== 2020 census ===
As of the 2020 census, there were 1,566 people residing in the city. The median age was 35.6 years. 27.5% of residents were under the age of 18 and 19.0% of residents were 65 years of age or older. For every 100 females, there were 99.0 males, and for every 100 females age 18 and over, there were 97.9 males.

0.0% of residents lived in urban areas, while 100.0% lived in rural areas.

There were 591 households in Moore Haven, of which 39.4% had children under the age of 18 living in them. Of all households, 39.3% were married-couple households, 23.4% were households with a male householder and no spouse or partner present, and 31.8% were households with a female householder and no spouse or partner present. About 26.4% of all households were made up of individuals and 12.9% had someone living alone who was 65 years of age or older.

There were 752 housing units, of which 21.4% were vacant. The homeowner vacancy rate was 5.2% and the rental vacancy rate was 12.8%.

According to the 2020 American Community Survey 5-year estimates, there were 422 families residing in the city.

=== 2010 census ===
As of the 2010 United States census, there were 1,680 people, 744 households, and 467 families residing in the city.

=== 2000 census ===
As of the census of 2000, there were 1,635 people, 572 households, and 414 families residing in the city. The population density was 1,508.8 inhabitants per square mile (582.6/km^{2}). There were 792 housing units at an average density of 730.9 per square mile (282.2/km^{2}). The racial makeup of the city was 61.28% White, 22.32% African American, 0.80% Native American, 0.43% Asian, 14.56% from other races, and 0.61% from two or more races. Hispanic or Latino of any race were 28.01% of the population.

In 2000, there were 572 households, out of which 35.0% had children under the age of 18 living with them, 48.8% were married couples living together, 14.5% had a female householder with no husband present, and 27.6% were non-families. 22.0% of all households were made up of individuals, and 10.1% had someone living alone who was 65 years of age or older. The average household size was 2.81 and the average family size was 3.23.

In 2000, in the city, the population was spread out, with 31.8% under the age of 18, 8.1% from 18 to 24, 25.5% from 25 to 44, 19.8% from 45 to 64, and 14.8% who were 65 years of age or older. The median age was 33 years. For every 100 females, there were 107.8 males. For every 100 females age 18 and over, there were 109.2 males.

In 2000, the median income for a household in the city was $26,801, and the median income for a family was $28,542. Males had a median income of $26,615 versus $20,250 for females. The per capita income for the city was $12,183. About 19.0% of families and 23.8% of the population were below the poverty line, including 30.0% of those under age 18 and 16.8% of those age 65 or over.

== Arts and culture ==
=== Historic district ===
The Moore Haven Downtown Historic District is a U.S. historic district, designated as such in 1995. The district contains seven historic buildings, and has a park which houses the only Cypress tree in the district.

== Education ==
All public schools are operated by the Glades County School District.

- Moore Haven Elementary School
- Moore Haven Junior Senior High School
