= Red Barn (Okeechobee, Florida) =

- U.S. National Register of Historic Places
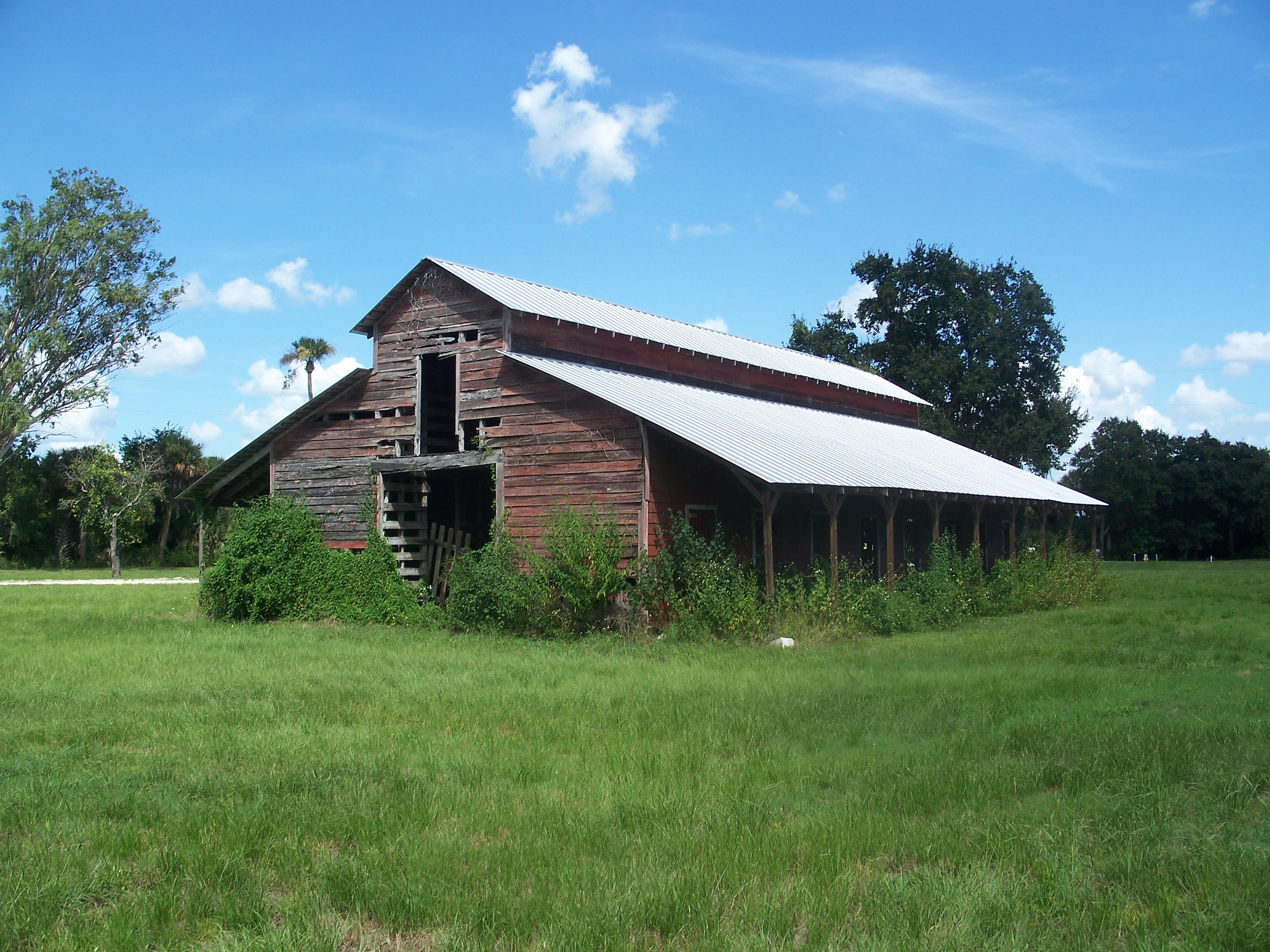

- Location within Florida Location within the United States
- Nearest city: Okeechobee, Florida (post office address)
- Coordinates: 27°4′25″N 81°6′50″W
- Area: less than one acre
- Built: 1941
- NRHP reference No.: 08001243
- Added to NRHP: December 24, 2008

The Red Barn is a historic barn located on the Brighton Seminole Indian Reservation in Glades County, Florida. It was built in 1941 with help from the Civilian Conservation Corps to serve the Seminole cattle business. It has a dirt floor and rests on a concrete block foundation. Its roof was replaced with a metal one after Hurricane Wilma in 2005. On December 24, 2008, it was added to the National Register of Historic Places.
