= Jordan-Beggs House =

Historic house in Florida, United States

- U.S. National Register of Historic Places
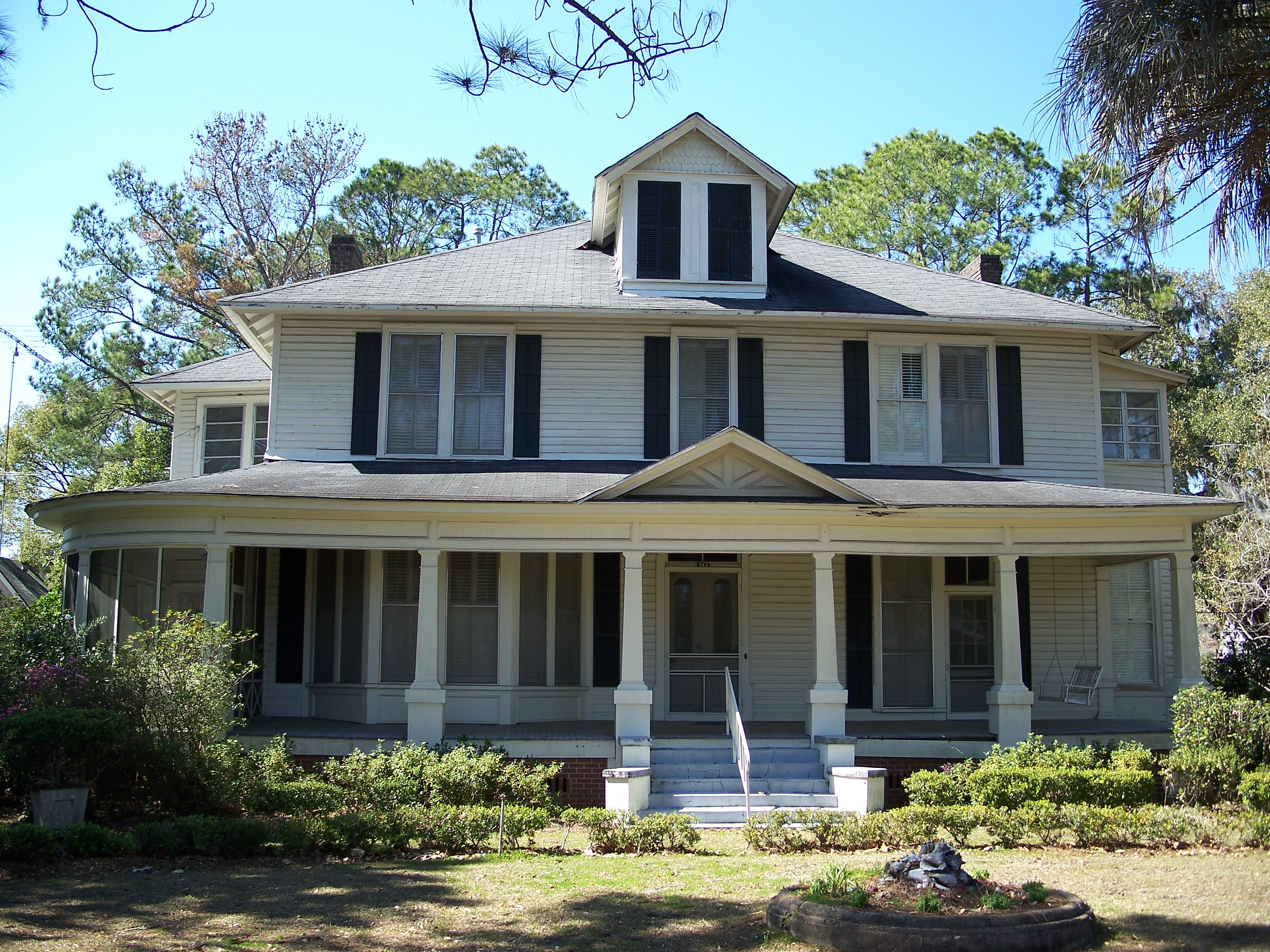

- Location within Florida Location within the United States
- Location: Madison, Florida
- Coordinates: 30°28′14″N 83°24′56″W
- Architectural style: Queen Anne, Colonial Revival
- NRHP reference No.: 97000557
- Added to NRHP: June 13, 1997

The Jordan-Beggs House (also known as the Beggs/Davis House) is a historic site in Madison, Florida, United States. It is located at 195 North Washington Street. On June 13, 1997, it was added to the U.S. National Register of Historic Places.

== Gallery ==
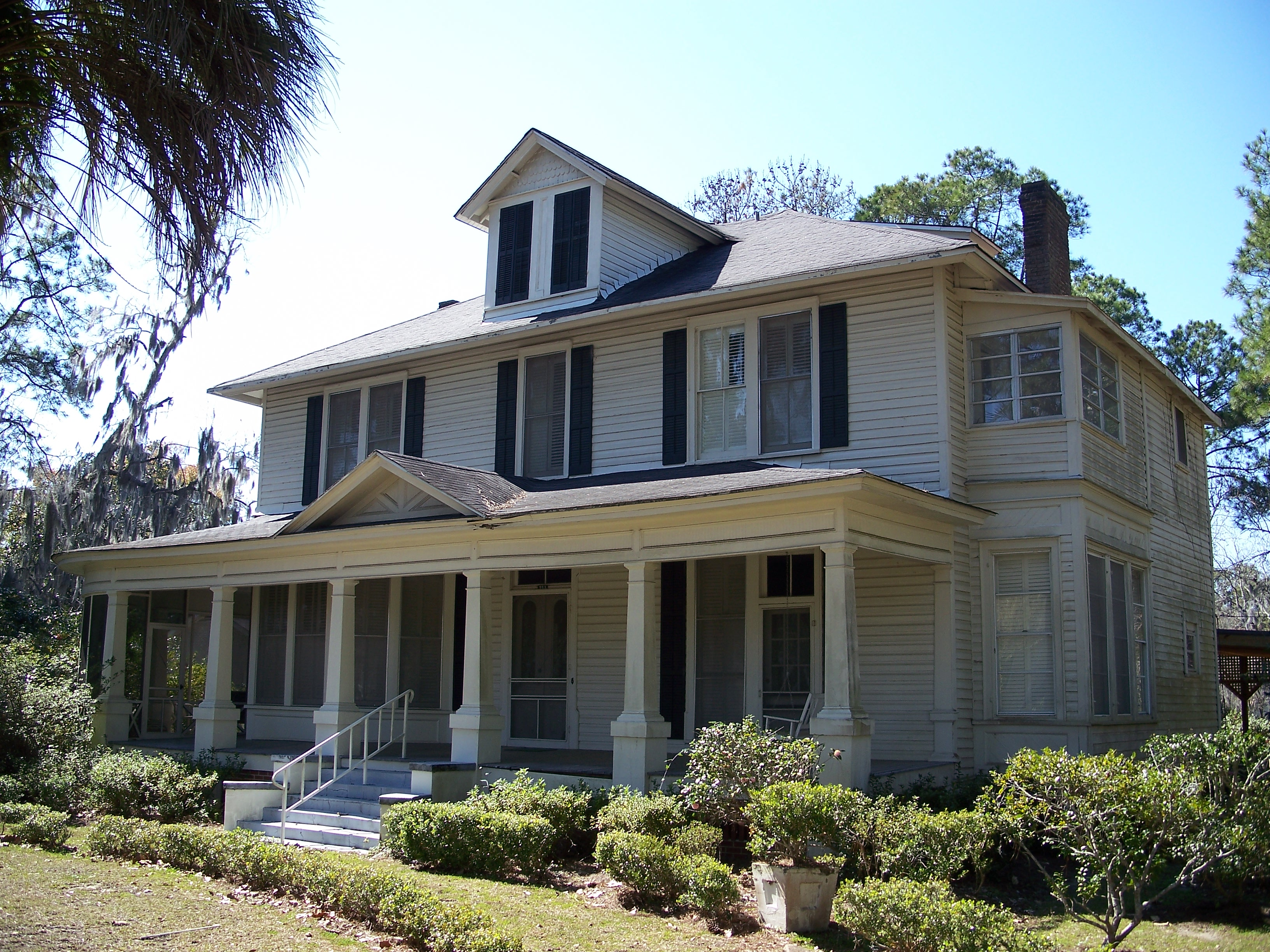

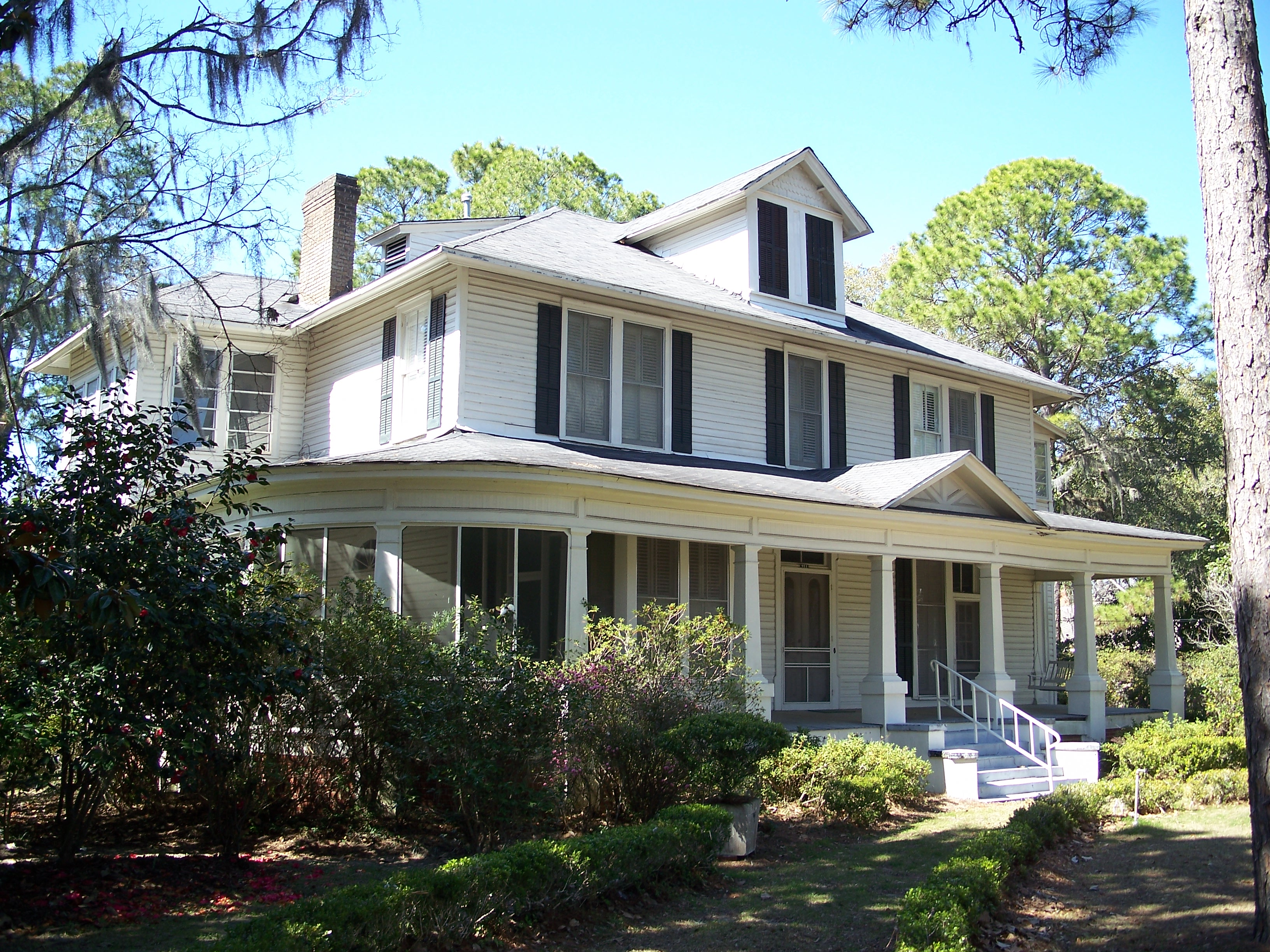
