= North Florida College =

Public community college in Madison, Florida, US

Coordinates: 30.473814°N 83.4236632°W

- Type: Public community college
- Established: 1958; 68 years ago
- Parent institution: Florida College System
- President: Jennifer Page
- Students: 1,255
- Location: Madison, Florida, United States
- Colors: Burgundy, gray, and black
- Nickname: NFC
- Mascot: Sentinel
- Website: www.nfc.edu

North Florida College is a public community college in Madison, Florida, United States. It is part of the Florida College System. It enrolls around 1,200 students and serves six rural counties in North Florida: Madison, Hamilton, Lafayette, Jefferson, Suwannee, and Taylor.

The school was founded as North Florida Junior College in 1957, with classes beginning the following year. It merged with the historically black Suwannee River Junior College in 1966. In July 1995, the District Board of Trustees changed the institution's name to North Florida Community College. Its current name was adopted in 2019.

== History ==
In 1957 the Florida Legislature authorized expansion of Florida's junior college system. North Florida Junior College, for white students, and Suwannee River Junior College, for black students, were founded simultaneously. In March 1958, Marshall W. Hamilton was appointed president and the first classes were held in September 1958.

Following the passage of the Civil Rights Act of 1964, which buttressed the 1954 Brown v. Board of Education court decision prohibiting racial discrimination in schools, Suwannee River Junior College was closed. Most faculty moved to North Florida Junior College. Although North Florida was now open to them, few black students enrolled.

In July 1995, the District Board of Trustees changed the institution's name to North Florida Community College. Over 20 years later, in 2016, NFCC announced plans to rename the college as it moved toward offering a new Bachelor of Science in Nursing, the college's first baccalaureate-level program.

In 2016, North Florida Community College established an educational partnership with Valdosta State University (VSU) in Valdosta, Georgia. In 2017, the Southern Association of Colleges and Schools accredited NFCC as a Level II baccalaureate degree-granting institution and the NFCC District Board of Trustees approved North Florida College as the new name.

== Gallery ==
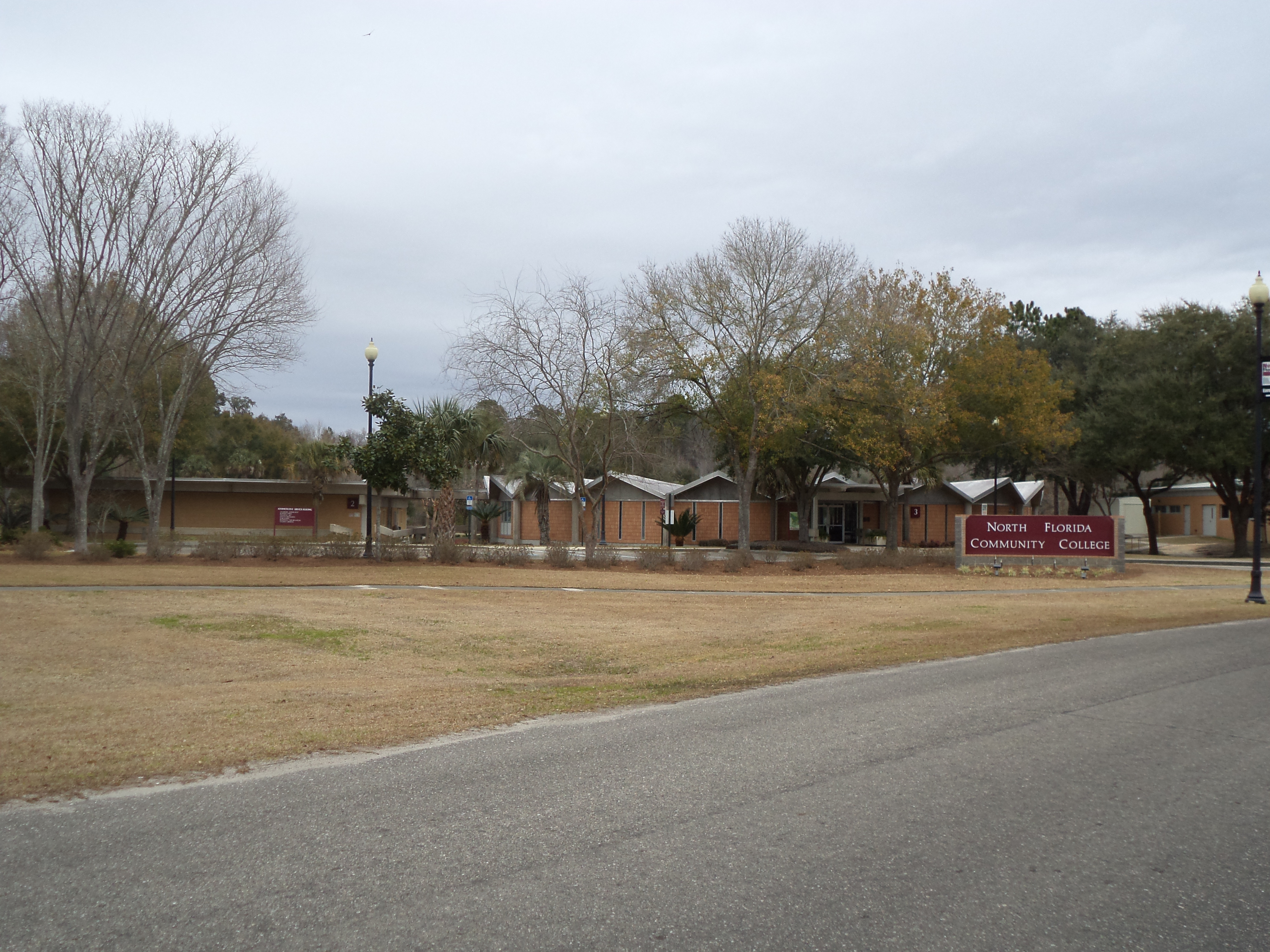
Entrance sign

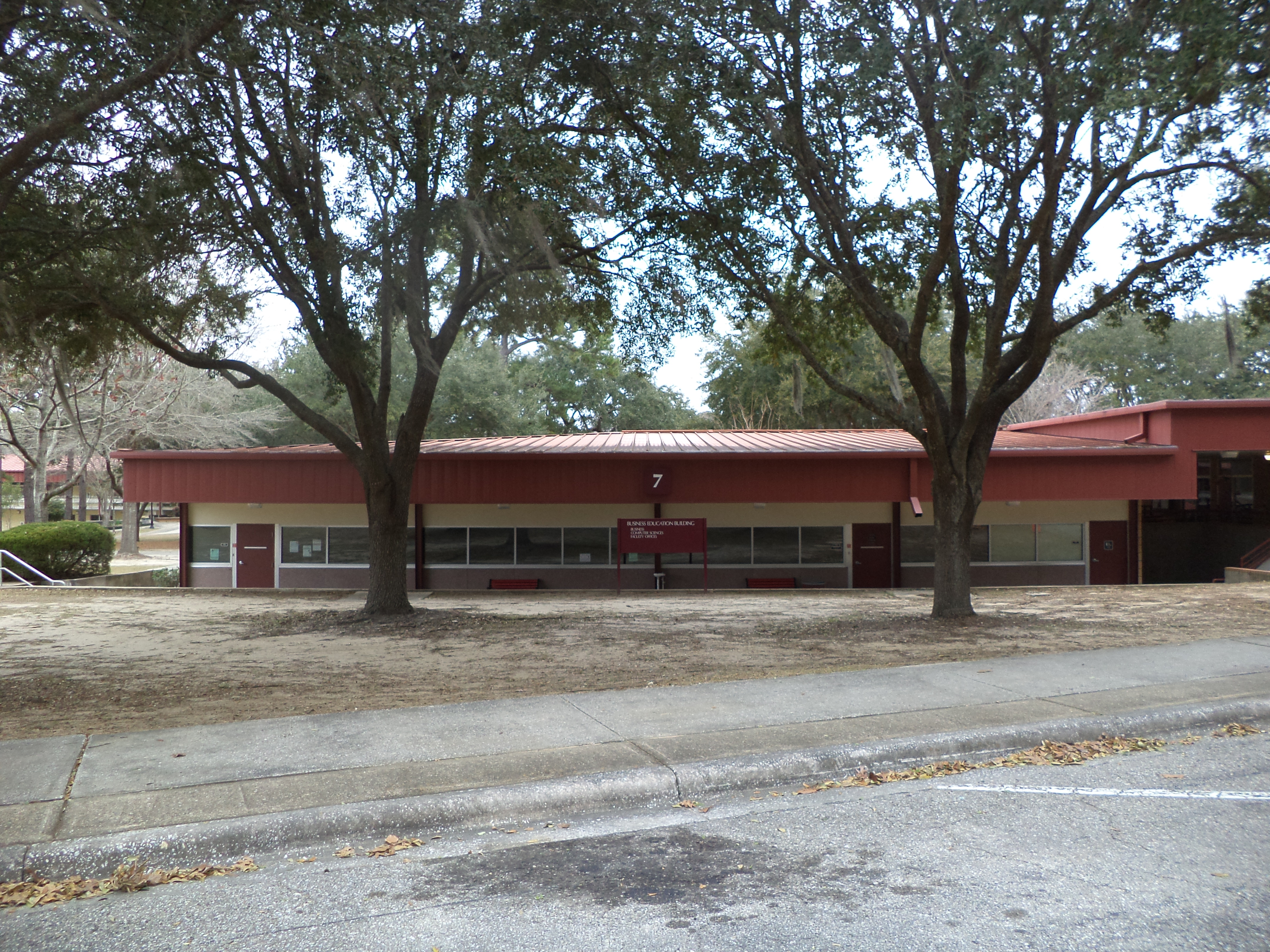
Business Education Building

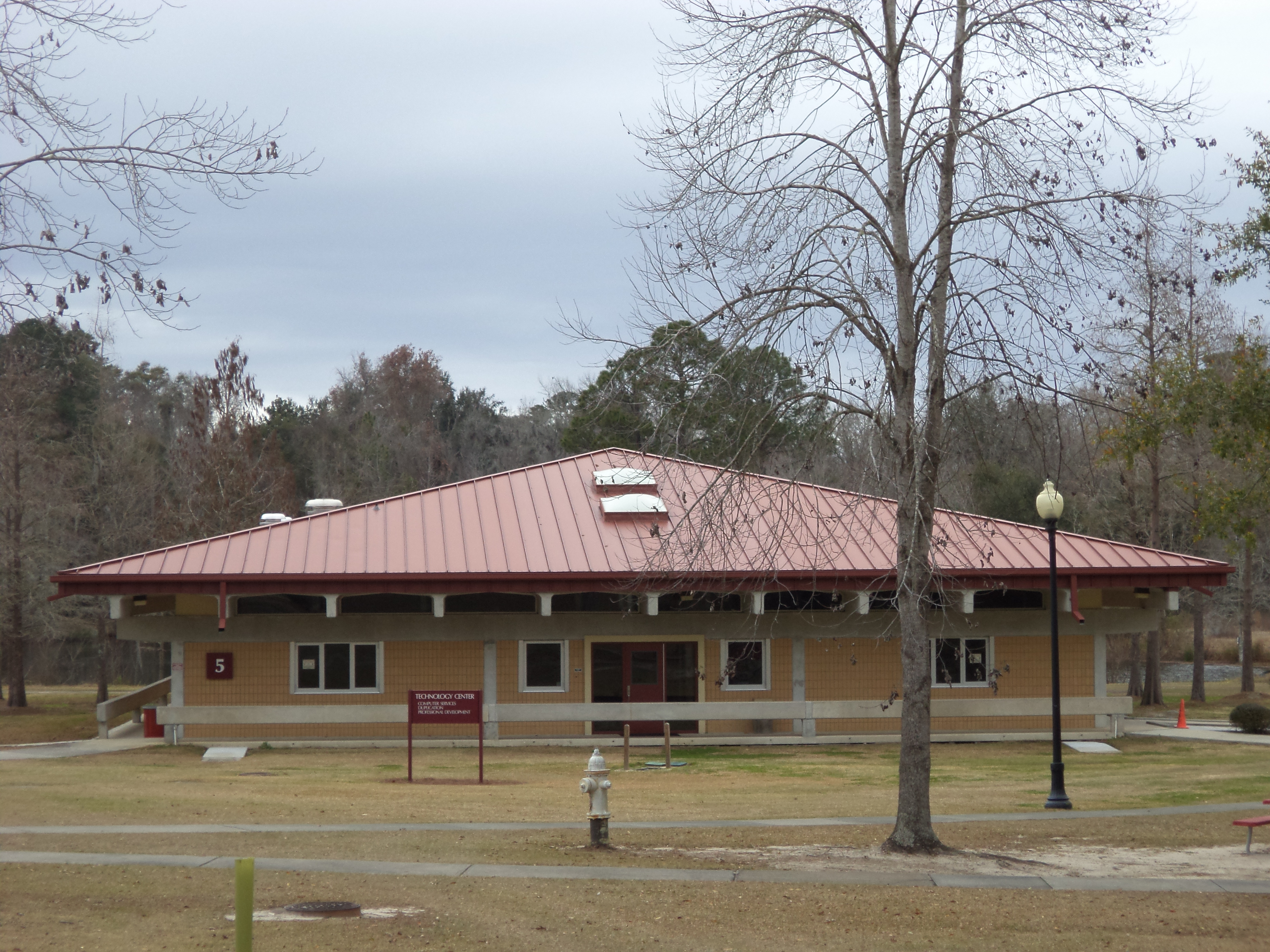
Technology Center

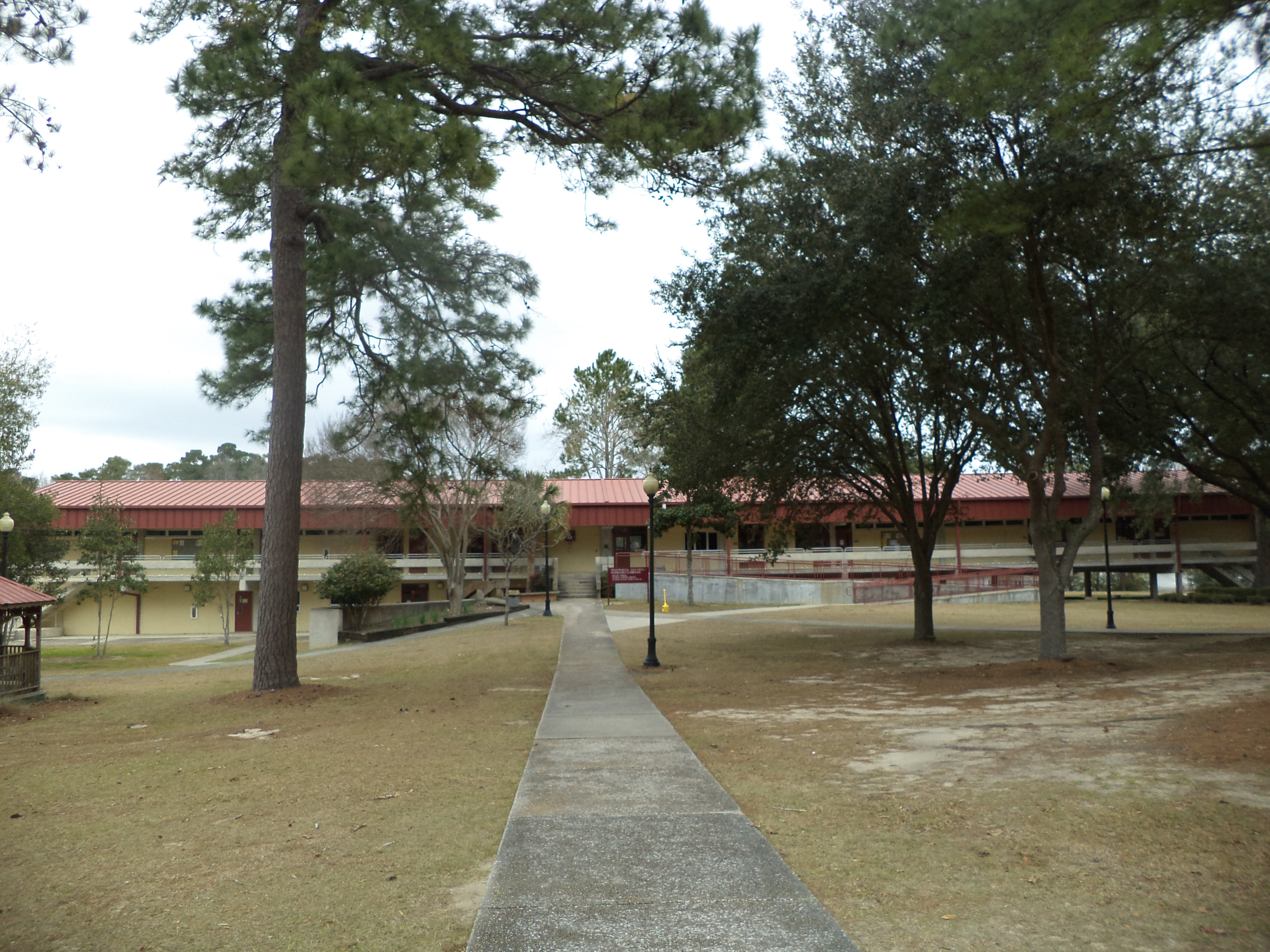
Mathematics Classrooms

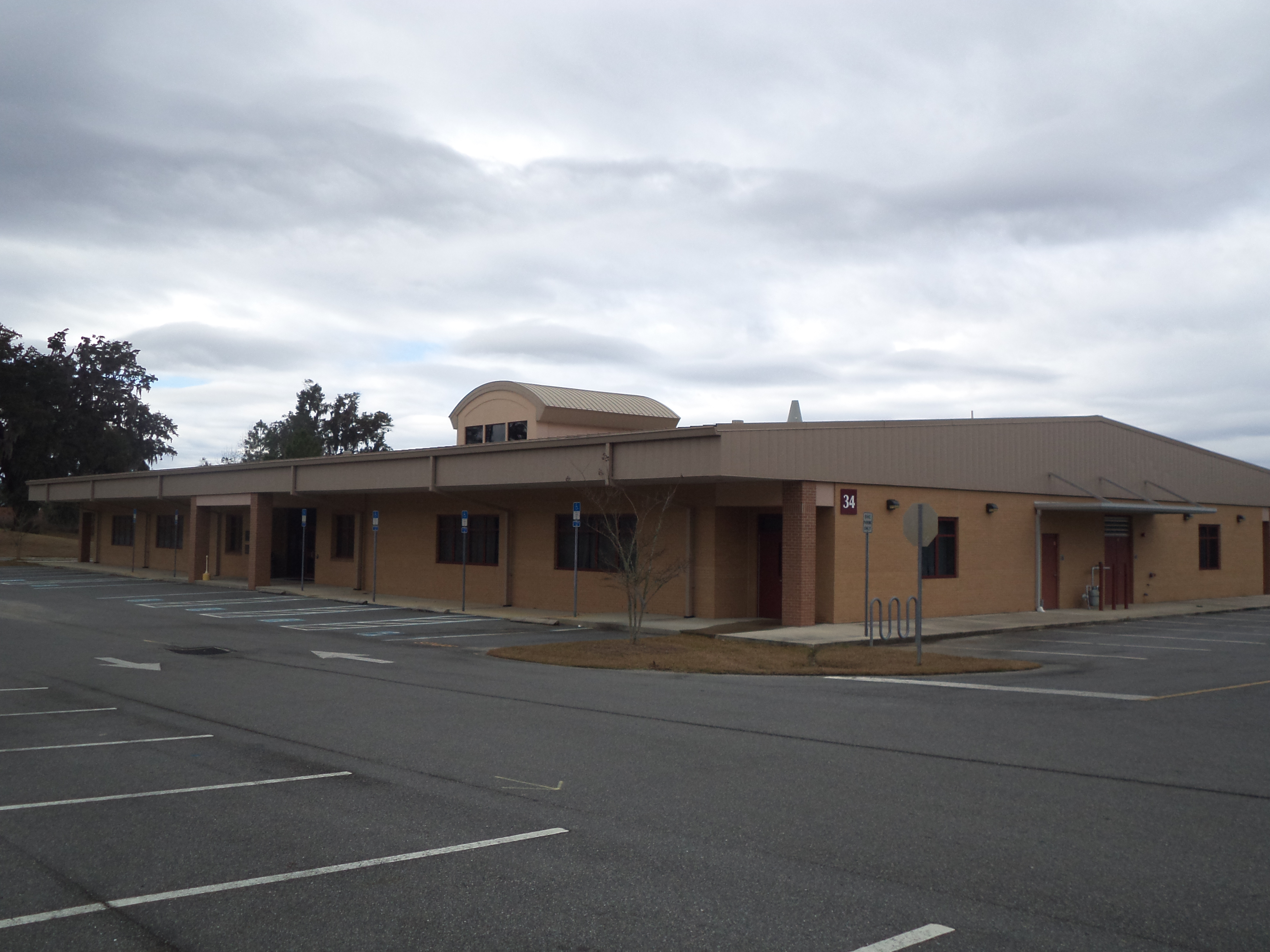
Science Learning Center

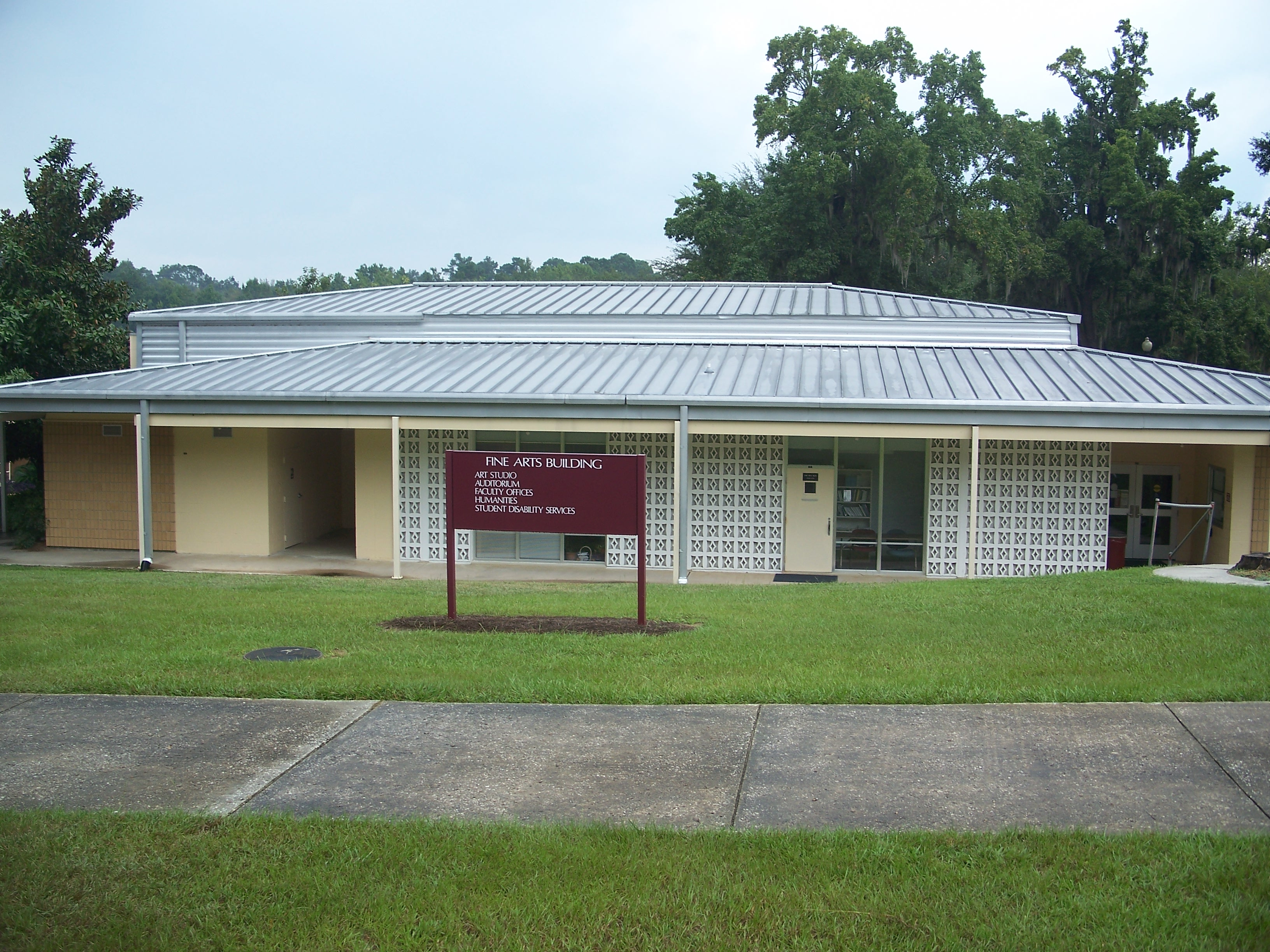
Fine Arts Building

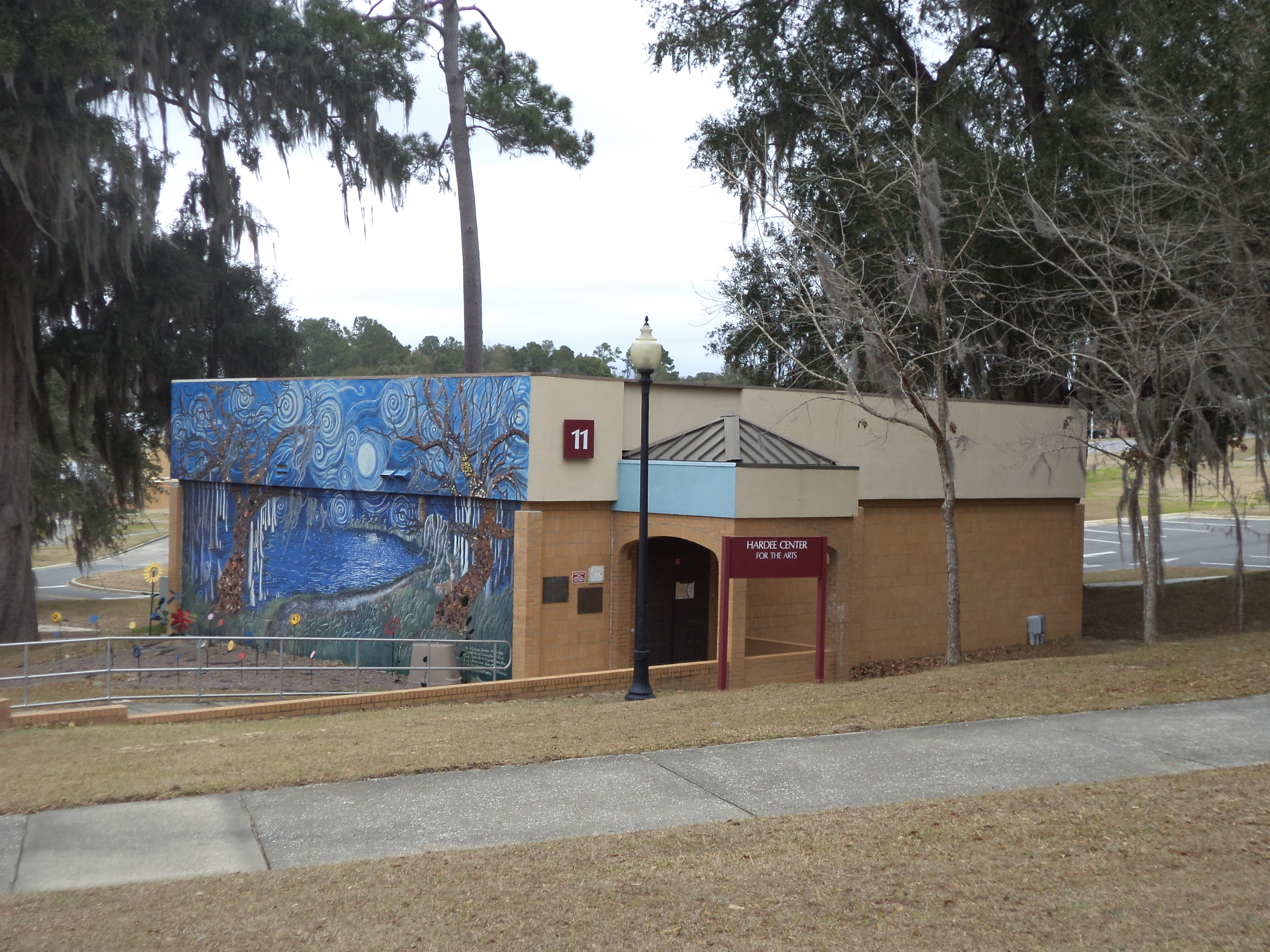
Hardee Center

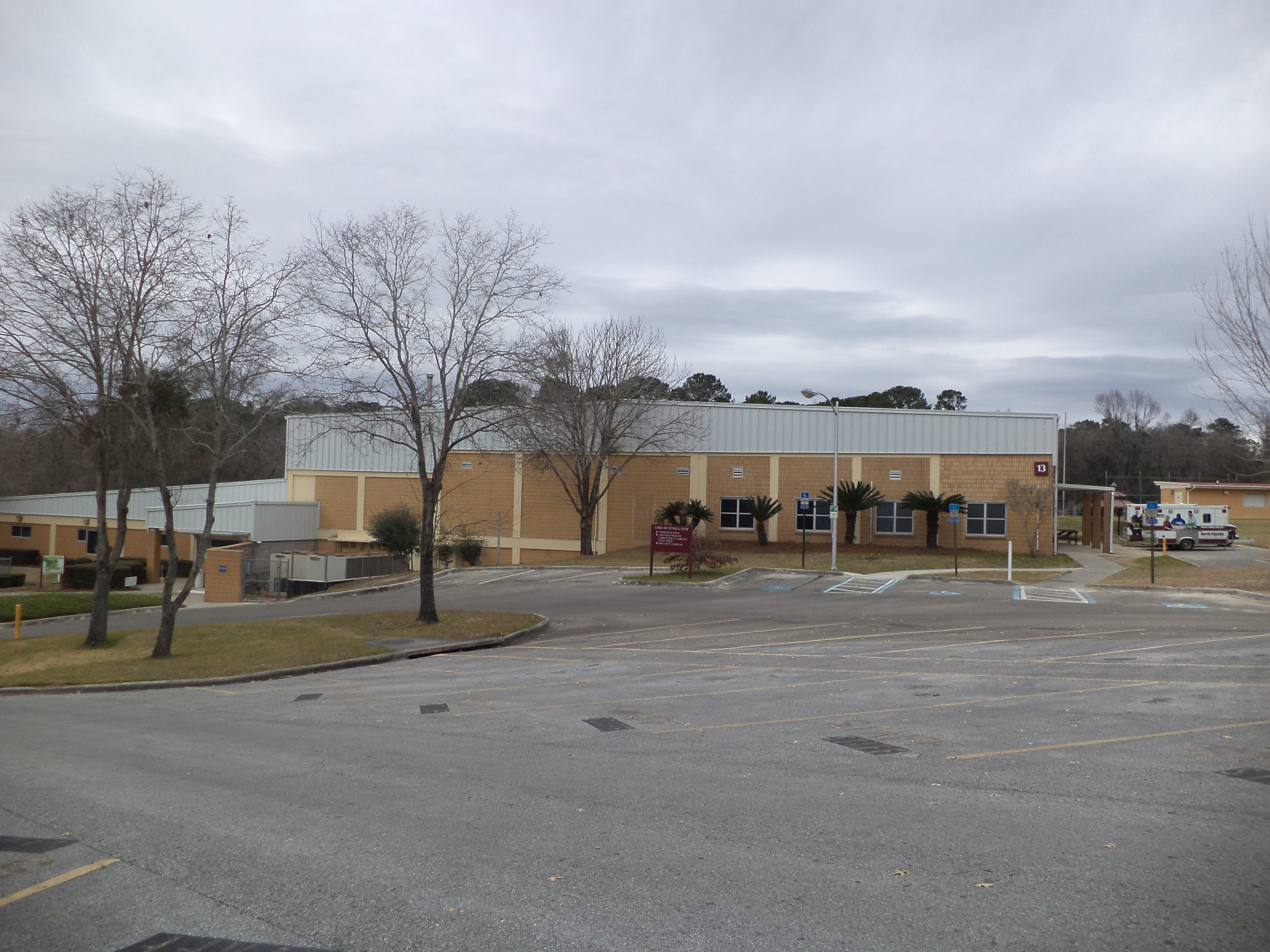
Career and Technical Education Center

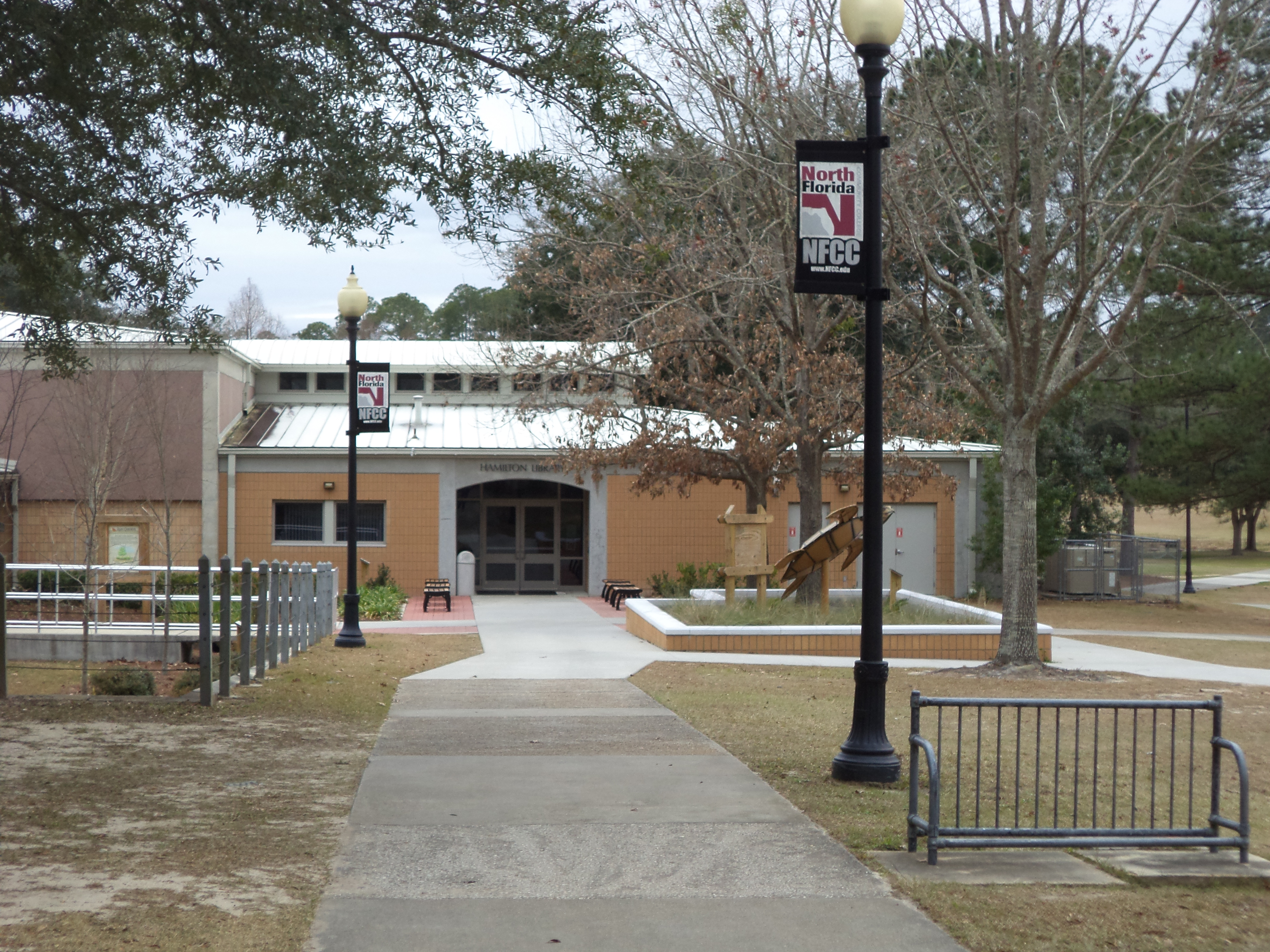
Hamilton Library

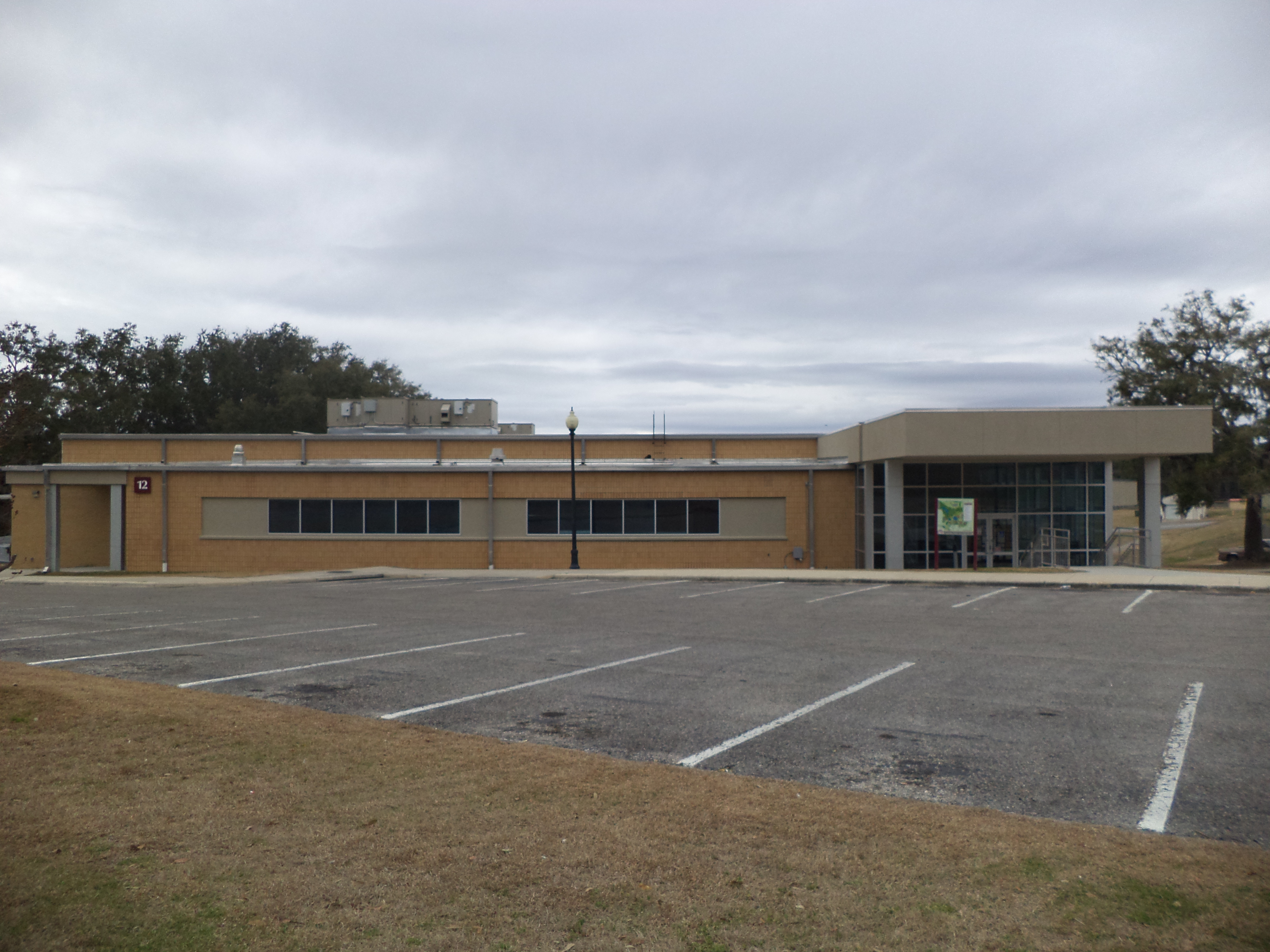
Colin P. Kelly Fitness Center

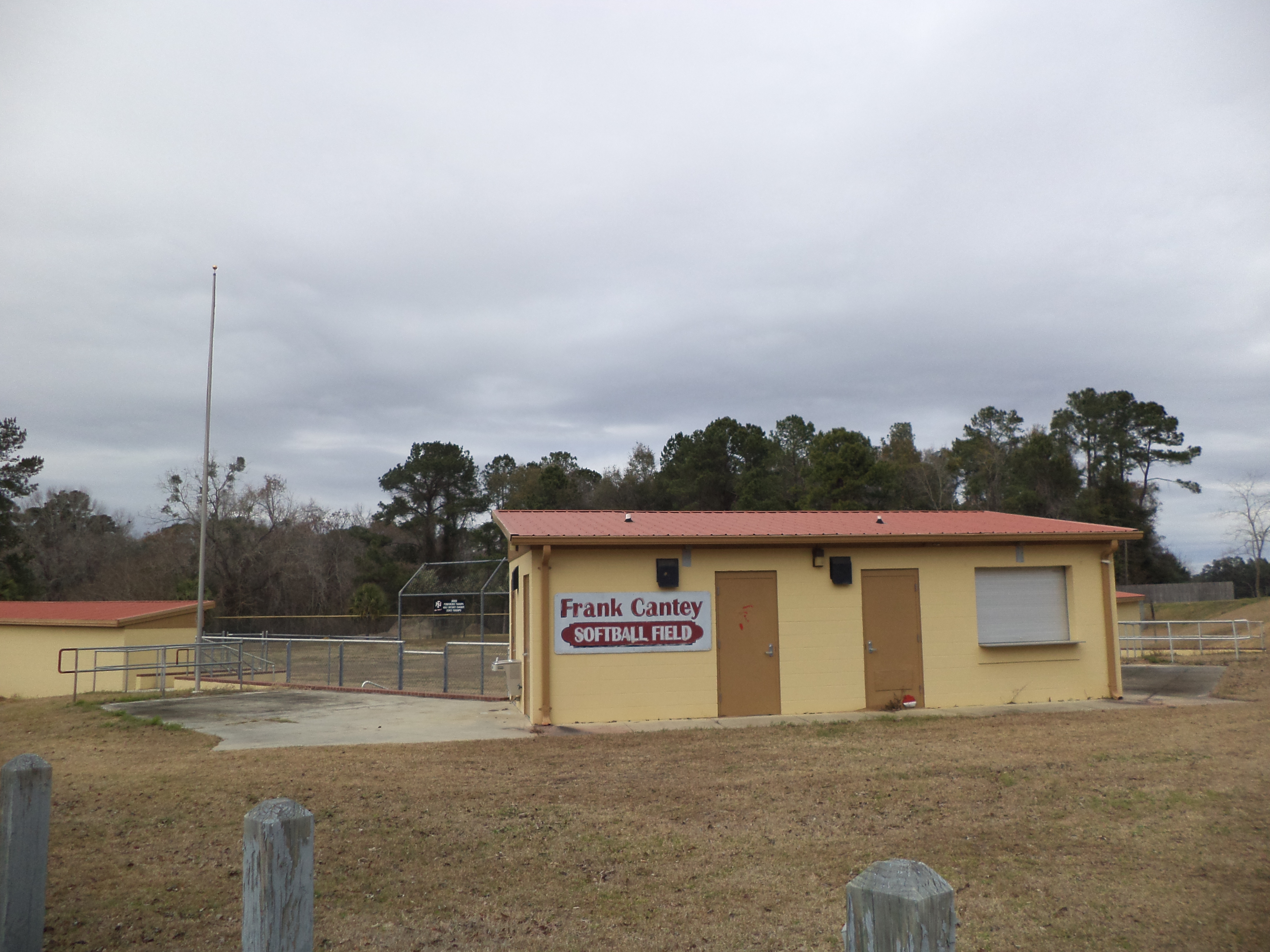
Frank Cantey Softball Field

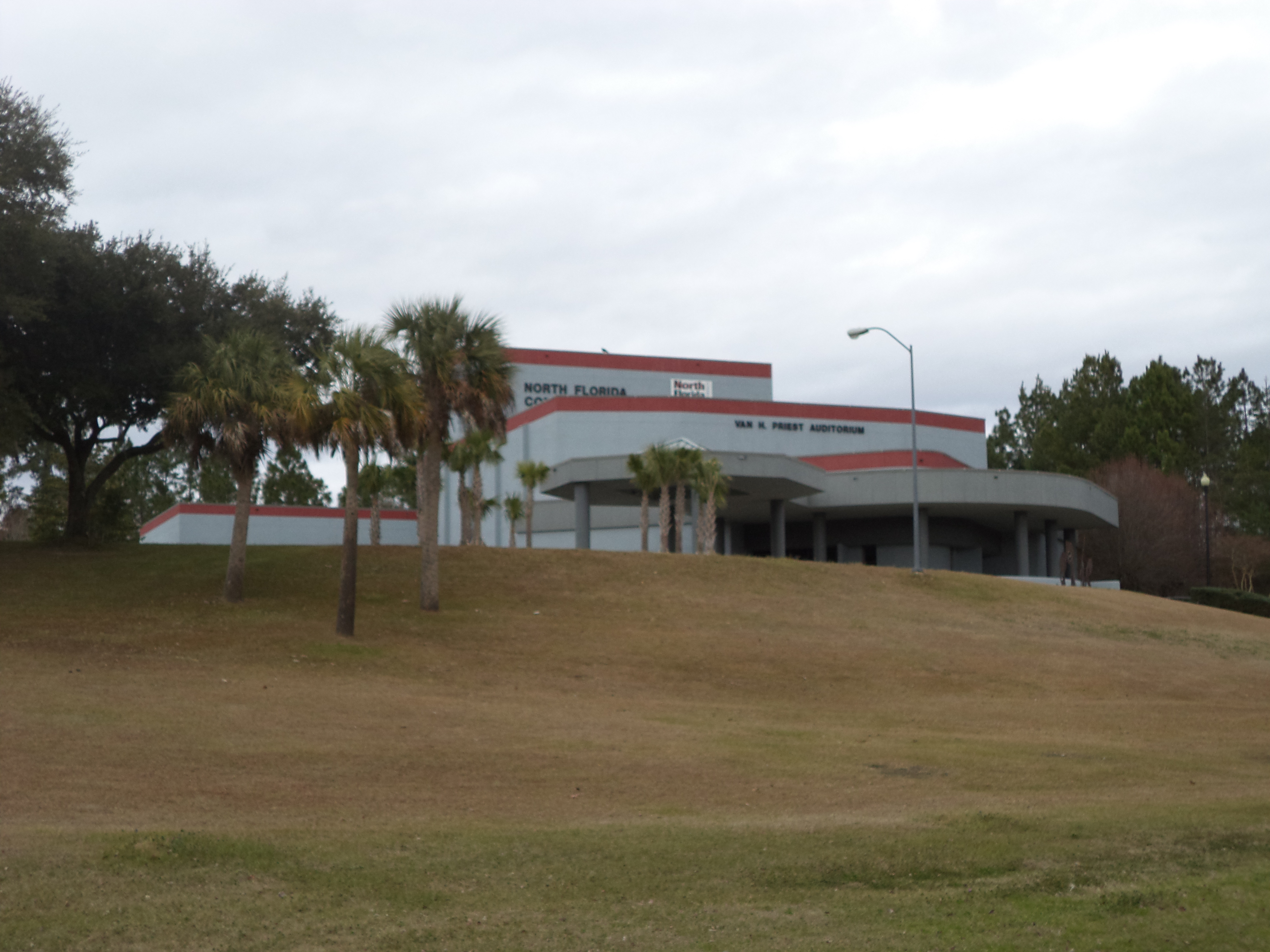
Van H. Priest Auditorium

== Notable alumni ==
- Leonard L. Bembry, politician
- Jesse Solomon, professional football player
- Kylie Williams, beauty pageant contestant

== See also ==
- Wardlaw-Smith House
