= Florida State Road 80 =

Highway in Florida

State Road 80
- SR 80 highlighted in red

Route information
- Maintained by FDOT
- Length: 123.500 mi (198.754 km)
- Existed: 1945 renumbering (definition)–present

Major junctions
- West end: US 41 in Fort Myers
- I-75 near Tice; SR 29 in LaBelle; US 27 in South Bay; US 98 / US 441 near Belle Glade; Florida's Turnpike near Royal Palm Beach; I-95 in West Palm Beach; US 1 in West Palm Beach
- East end: US 98 / SR A1A in Palm Beach

Location
- Country: United States
- State: Florida
- Counties: Lee, Hendry, Palm Beach

Highway system
- Florida State Highway System; Interstate; US; State; Former; Pre‑1945; Toll; Scenic
| ← SR 79 | → SR 81 |

State Road 80 (SR 80) also known as Palm Beach Boulevard in Lee County and Southern Boulevard in Palm Beach County is a 123.5 miles (198.8 km) route linking US 41 Business in Fort Myers and State Road A1A in Palm Beach. The road is the northernmost of three linking Southwest Florida to South Florida via the Everglades (Alligator Alley and Tamiami Trail being the other two). Due to increasing traffic, State Road 80 has experienced upgrades and widening in various sections since 2000. During the 2026 Florida legislative session, lawmakers passed Senate Bill 628, designating the entirety of State Road 80 as President Donald J. Trump Highway, effective July 1, 2026.

== Route description ==
=== Lee and Hendry counties ===
State Road 80 begins at an intersection with US 41 (Tamiami Trail) in downtown Fort Myers. From the terminus, it runs briefly along Main Street northeast to Monroe Street in the historic downtown of Fort Myers. This segment of SR 80 terminates at Monroe Street and the route becomes discontinuous. Historically, SR 80 continued east through downtown but that segment has since been turned over to city control.

State Road 80 resumes at Allen Street (just east of Seaboard Street) on the east side of Fort Myers. From here, it is known as Palm Beach Boulevard, a four-lane divided highway that parallels the Caloosahatchee River. It follows the river east out of the city, expanding to six lanes east of the Ortiz Avenue (CR 865) intersection in Tice. It has an interchange with Interstate 75 as it passes through the eastern suburbs of Fort Myers before being reduced to four lanes east of SR 31 before leaving Lee County and entering Hendry County just east of Alva.

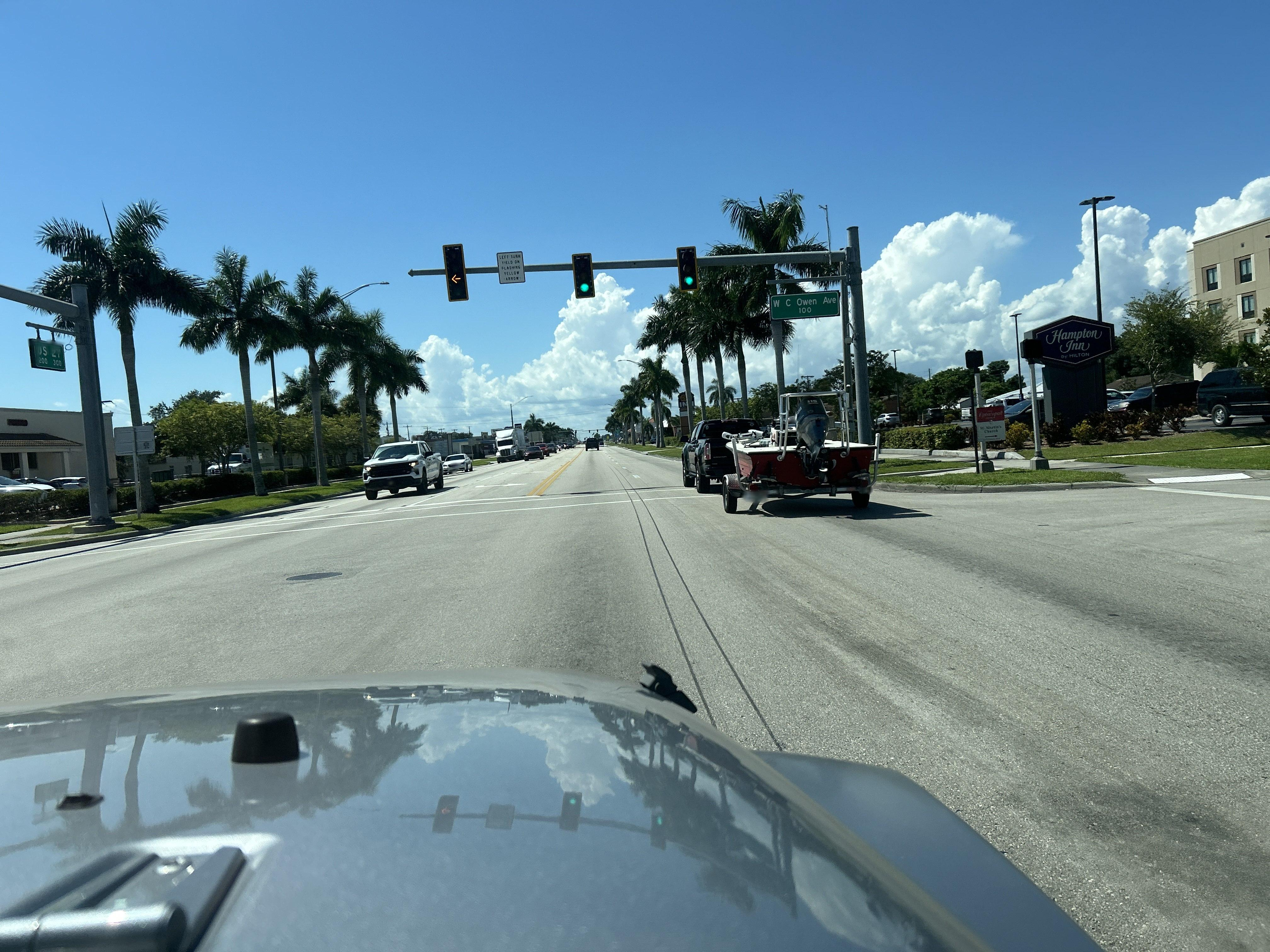
SR 80/US 27 in Clewiston

In Hendry County, SR 80 continues east to LaBelle, Florida. In LaBelle, SR 80 is known as Hickpochee Avenue and it serves as the town's main street and intersects SR 29. After LaBelle, it continues east through rural Hendry County to an interchange with US 27 just west of Clewiston. From here, SR 80 and US 27 continue east concurrently through Clewiston, where it is known as Sugarland Highway. Beyond Clewiston, SR 80 continues east and runs along the Herbert Hoover Dike on the south side of Lake Okeechobee and enters Palm Beach County.

=== Palm Beach County ===
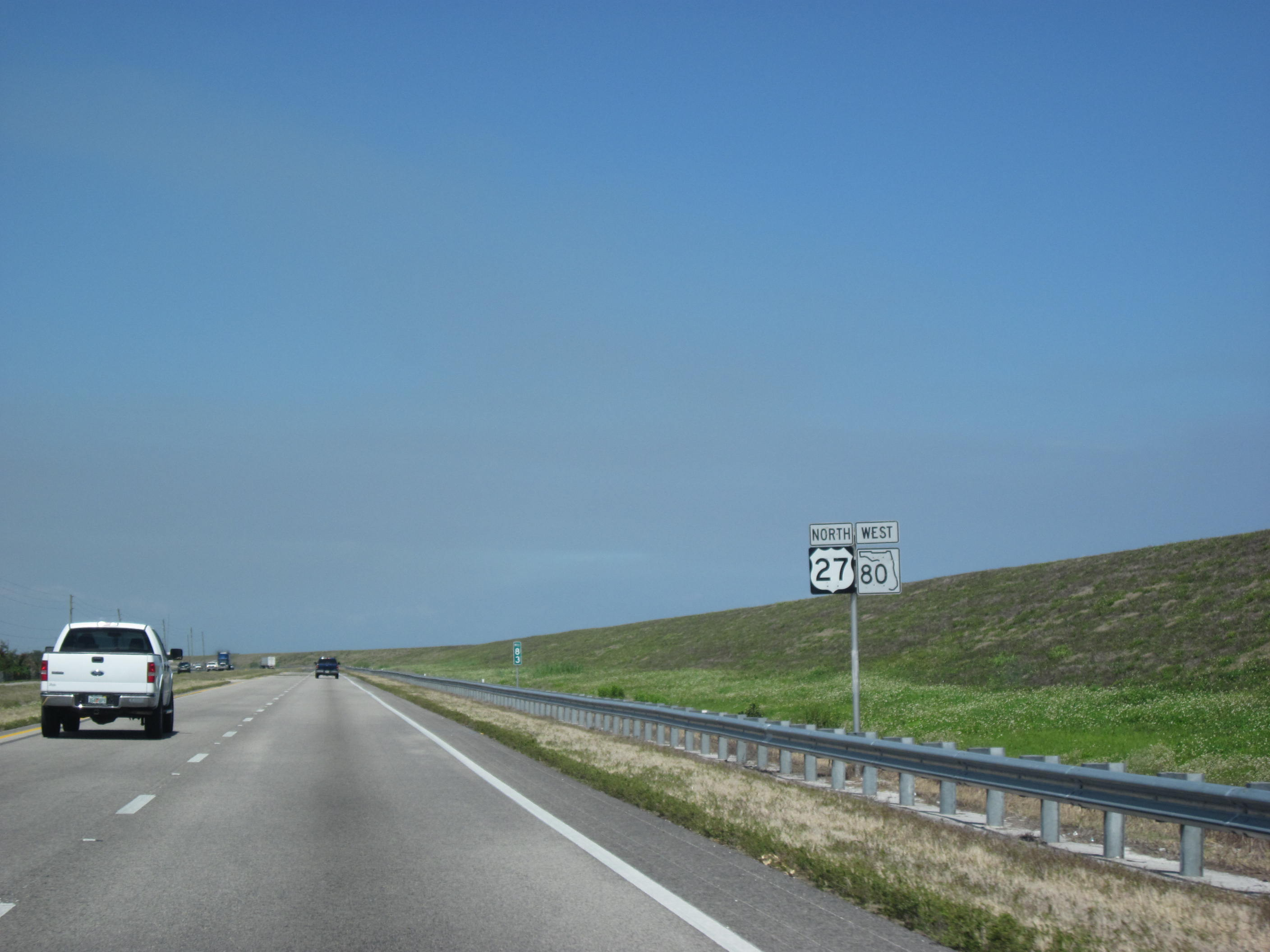
SR 80/US 27 along the Herbert Hoover Dike

In Palm Beach County, SR 80 and US 27 continue along the Herbert Hoover Dike for another 11 miles before reaching South Bay. In South Bay, the US 27 concurrency ends with US 27 heading south to Miami and SR 80 turns east to Belle Glade. It then runs northeast through the city of Belle Glade.

Just north of Belle Glade, SR 80 comes to an intersection with US 98 and US 441. From this intersection, US 98, US 441, and SR 80 all head east concurrently along the Kenneth C. Mock Memorial Highway. The route continues east through sugarcane fields in the Everglades Agricultural Area. At SR 700, the route turns southeast to Twenty Mile Bend, where it turns back east and joins Southern Boulevard. Lion Country Safari just east of Twenty Mile Bend marks the beginning of a rural to suburban and later urban transition of the road for the remainder of its journey. The road doubles from four to eight lanes in Royal Palm Beach, as the road serves as the border between Royal Palm Beach and Wellington.

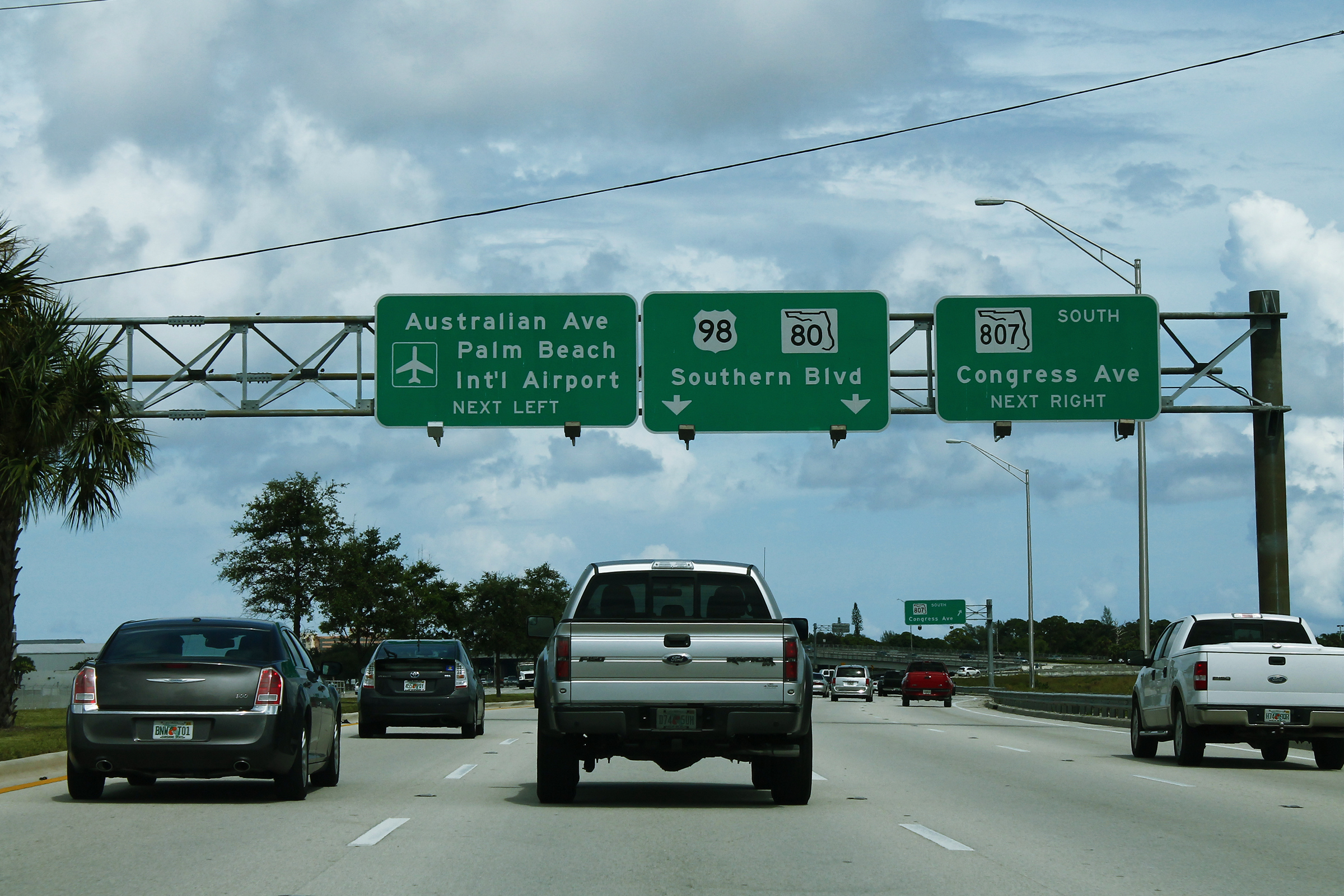
SR 80/US 98 near President Donald J. Trump International Airport

At the State Road 7 intersection, US 441 turns south towards Miami. The South Florida Fairgrounds and the Coral Sky Amphitheater, where the South Florida Fair takes place, are next on the route, just east of SR 7. After passing Florida's Turnpike, it gains two more lanes and becomes an expressway, with diamond interchanges with Jog Road, Haverhill Road and Military Trail. East of Military Trail, it loses a lane in each direction as it straddles the southern end of President Donald J. Trump International Airport, where private aircraft are serviced, with commercial access to the airport available via SR 704A. It then approaches a bridge over the Tri-Rail main line as it intersects Interstate 95 at Exit 68, then becomes a four-lane road in several older, high-density neighborhoods in West Palm Beach.

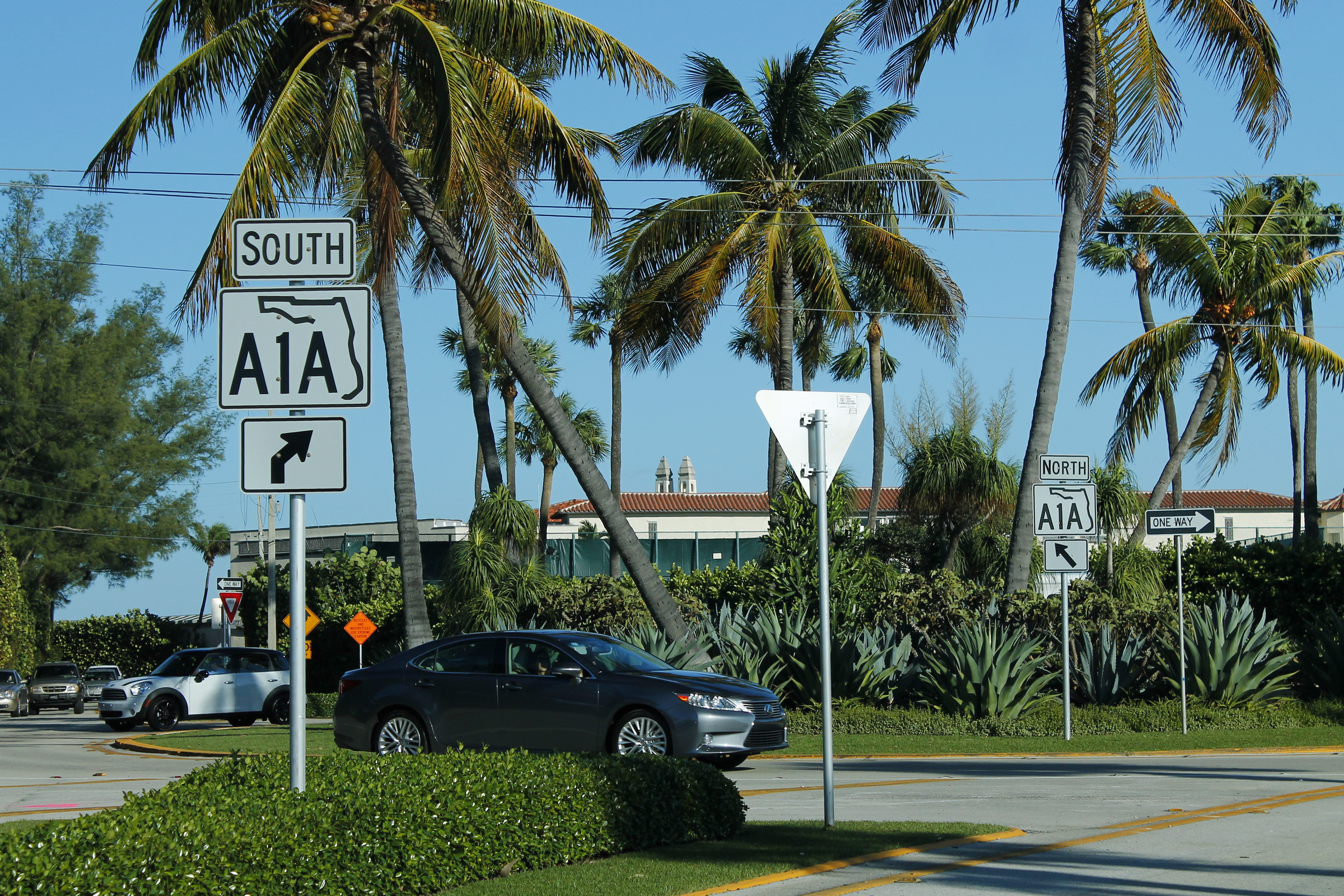
Eastern terminus of US 98/SR 80, Palm Beach

East of the Florida East Coast Railway bridge crossing, it intersects US 1 and SR 5, reducing to two lanes as it crosses Lake Worth Lagoon on two bridges, and ending on a roundabout with SR A1A in Palm Beach near the Mar-a-Lago estate.

== History ==
=== Planning and construcion ===
The route of State Road 80 was largely built in the 1920s and early 1930s. In its early years, it was simply known as the Fort Myers-Palm Beach Road. The unfinished route was added to the state highway system in 1923 and was designated as State Road 25 from Palm Beach to Fort Myers. SR 25 would also extend from Fort Myers southwest a short distance to Punta Rassa on the gulf coast.

The first vehicle to travel the route from Belle Glade to Palm Beach was in 1923. The section from Twenty Mile Bend to West Palm Beach was also considered part of the Conners Highway, which opened on July 4, 1924. The segment of the route in Lee County was complete by 1927. The route was complete from Belle Glade to Clewiston by 1929. The segment from Clewiston to LaBelle was completed in 1931.

The road was fully complete on April 7, 1933 with the opening of the final segment from the Lee/Hendry county line to LaBelle. This final segment of the route was built beside the former LaBelle Subdivision of the Seaboard Air Line Railroad which existed from 1926 to 1942).

=== Changes and realignments ===
As a result of the 1945 Florida State Road renumbering, SR 25 was redesignated as State Road 80 from Fort Myers to Palm Beach with the segment west of Fort Myers to Punta Rassa (present-day McGregor Boulevard) becoming State Road 867. After the renumbering, the SR 25 designation then was applied to a route that would become US 27, essentially keeping the SR 25 designation from South Bay to Whidden Corner (just west of Clewiston) concurrently with SR 80. US 27 was added to this concurrency when it was extended along the post-1945 SR 25 in 1948 (which remains its hidden designation). The US 441 concurrency was added to SR 80 between Belle Glade and Royal Palm Beach in 1950. The US 98 concurrency was added to SR 80 from Twenty Mile Bend to Palm Beach in 1951.

In the late 1940s, the current alignment of SR 80 between Tice and Olga (just east of Fort Myers) was completed. The previous alignment of SR 80 in this area ran along what is now Old Olga Road, Buckingham Road, and Orange River Boulevard.

SR 80 (along the US 27 concurrency) was realigned between Clewiston and South Bay to its current four-lane route along the Herbert Hoover Dike in the 1960s. The original alignment remains just to the south though it has been severed as a through route. The former alignment is known as "Old US Highway 27" and Corkscrew Boulevard.

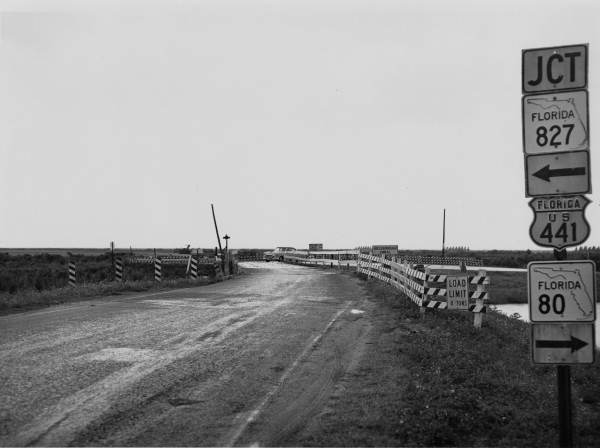
SR 80 and US 441 signage in 1953 along the original alignment (present day CR 880) near Six Mile Bend

The current four-lane segment of SR 80 between Belle Glade and Twenty Mile Bend, designated as the Kenneth C. Mock Memorial Highway, was completed in 1989. This segment was built to make SR 80 a four-lane divided highway between Belle Glade and West Palm Beach. Prior to this, SR 80 (and US 441) ran just to the south along what is now County Road 880. US 98, which previously ran along SR 700 (Conners Highway), would later be rerouted onto this route beginning around 2000.

Until 2002, Palm Beach County's Southern Boulevard was a four-lane road with a center left-turn lane, causing high gridlock due to the rapidly growing western suburbs of Loxahatchee, Royal Palm Beach and Wellington. The road was known as "Killer 80" due to its high fatality rate. In 2002, after many years of debate, the Florida Department of Transportation embarked on a $78 million project to upgrade and widen Southern Boulevard from I-95 to US 441/SR 7. Between 2003 and 2008, it was transformed into a limited-access highway with freeway-grade diamond interchanges at the most congested intersections, with traffic signals remaining at others.

=== Downtown Fort Myers alignment ===
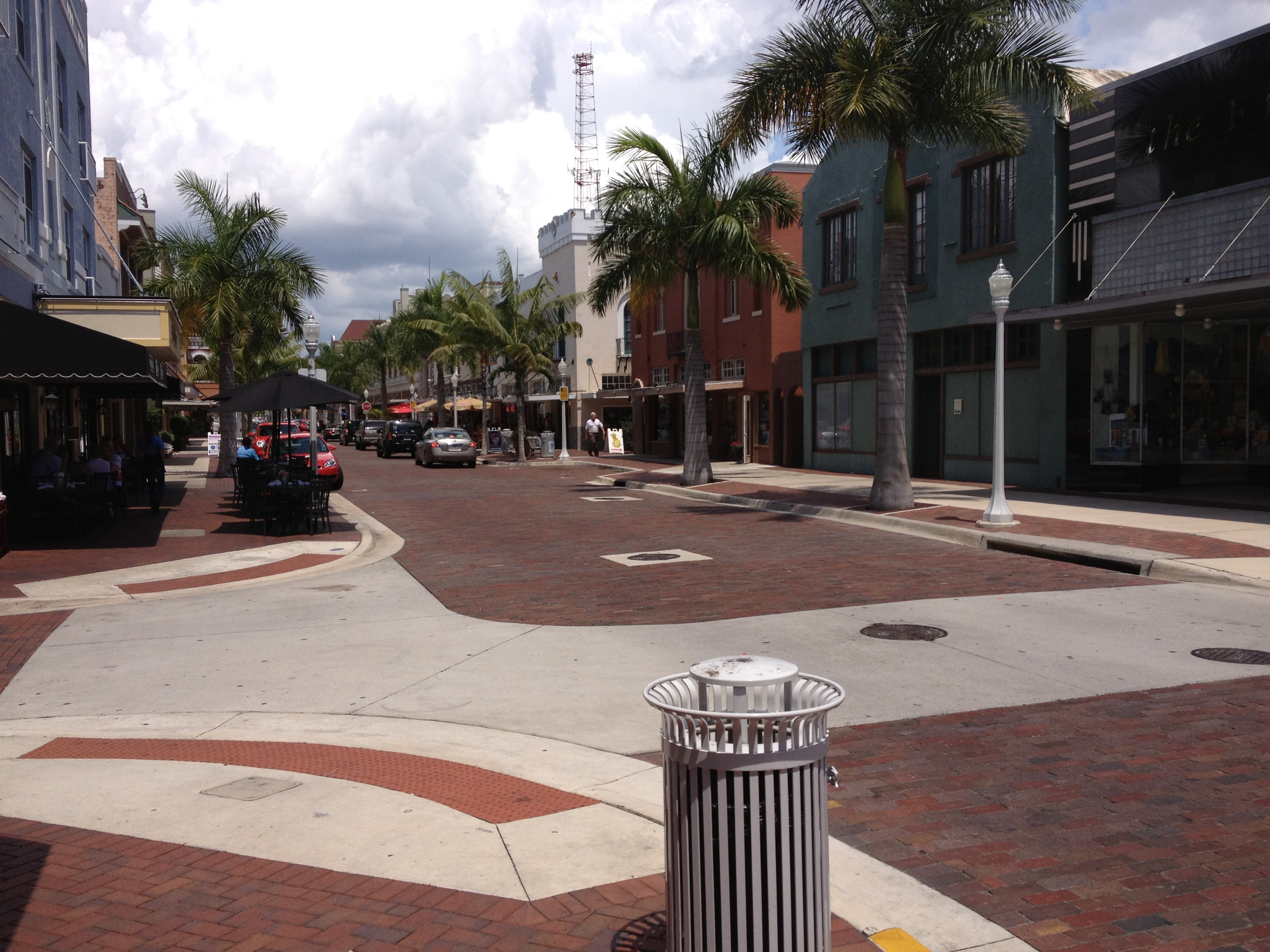
Former SR 80 through downtown Fort Myers on First Street.

State Road 80's routing through downtown Fort Myers has changed a few times over the years. After the 1945 Florida state road renumbering, SR 80 entered Downtown Fort Myers along First Street and terminated at Fowler Street. At the time, US 41 (Tamiami Trail) ran through downtown Fort Myers on First Street west of Fowler Street and crossed the Caloosahatchee River on the original Edison Bridge.

SR 80 would be extended through downtown along First Street in 1964 when US 41 was rerouted over the Caloosahatchee Bridge near Carson Street on the west side of downtown (First Street also carried the US 41 Business Route concurrently west of Fowler Street at this time).

In 1988, SR 80 was split into one-way street pairs from Monroe Street through downtown to Seaboard Street in East Fort Myers. The conversion to one-way street pairs was part of a larger project to widen SR 80 to a multi-lane divided road from Downtown Fort Myers to Interstate 75. From Monroe Street, eastbound traffic ran along Second Street and Seaboard Street, where it reconnected to the westbound lanes at Palm Beach Boulevard. Westbound traffic continued along Palm Beach Boulevard and First Street, and then shifted to Bay Street west of Fowler Street. At Monroe Street, both directions rejoined along Main Street to connect to US 41.

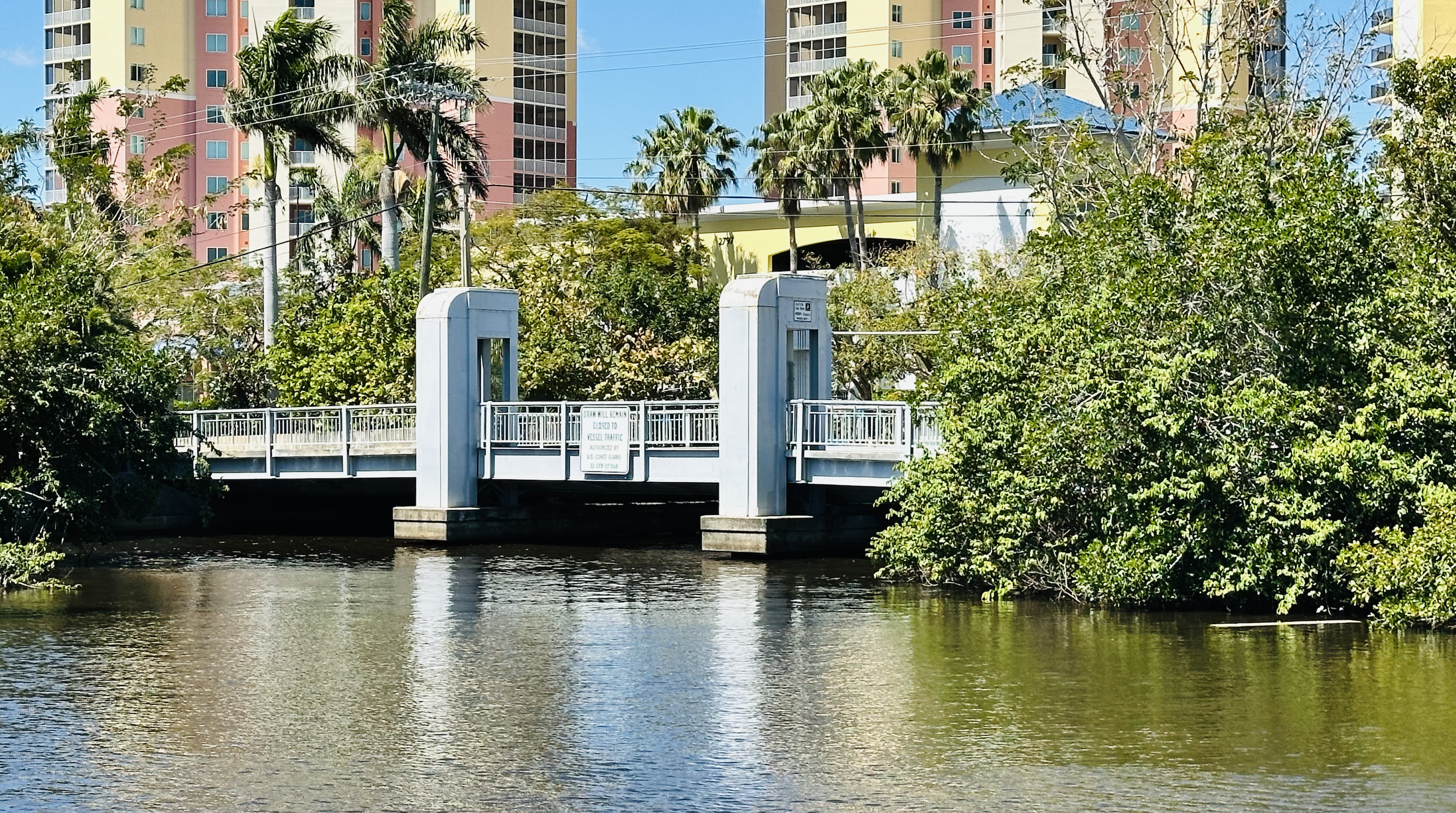
Historic Billy's Creek Lift Bridge, built in 1941, carries the former route of SR 80 near Fort Myers

SR 80 between Monroe and Fowler Streets was relinquished to the city of Fort Myers on January 11, 2006 as part of the downtown redevelopment and streetscape effort, which first created the gap in the route that exists today. The city restored this segment of the streets to two-way traffic. The segment of SR 80 east of Fowler Street to Allen Street (just east of Seaboard Street) remained one-way and under state control at this time.

SR 80 east of Fowler Street to Allen Street was relinquished to the city in August 2018. Though the state still maintains the historic Billy's Creek Lift Bridge, which was built in 1941. The City of Fort Myers restored the remaining one-way segments of First, Second, and Seaboard Streets to two-way traffic in June 2022.

=== Recent history ===
In Hendry County, a project to improve the intersection between SR 80 and US 27 and add an overpass was completed at the end of 2014. SR 80 was widened from east of LaBelle to CR 833 west of Clewiston in 2020. This widening eliminated the last two-lane undivided segment of SR 80, and it is now at least four lanes from Fort Myers to West Palm Beach.

In 2022, the current bridges across Lake Worth Lagoon between West Palm Beach and Palm Beach were completed, replacing bridges that had been built in 1950.

== Major intersections ==
| County | Location | mi | km | Destinations | Notes |
|---|---|---|---|---|---|
| Lee | Fort Myers | 0.000 | 0.000 | US 41 (Cleveland Avenue) to CR 867 south (McGregor Boulevard) | west end of concurrency with US 41 Bus. |
| Lee | Fort Myers | 0.168 | 0.270 | SR 82 east / US 41 Bus. east (Monroe Street south); Main Street east – Downtown | east end of concurrency with US 41 Bus. |
| Lee | Fort Myers | Gap in route | | | |
| Lee | Fort Myers | 0.000 | 0.000 | US 41 Bus. south (Fowler Street / SR 739) | One-way southbound |
| Lee | Fort Myers | 0.237 | 0.381 | US 41 Bus. north (Park Avenue / SR 739) – North Fort Myers | One-way northbound |
| Lee | Fort Myers | 0.831 | 1.337 | Billy's Creek Bridge over Billy Creek (under state maintenance) | |
| Lee | Fort Myers | 1.261 | 2.029 | Allen Street | west end of state maintenance |
| Lee | Tice | 3.861 | 6.214 | Ortiz Avenue (CR 865 south) | Former SR 80B; Northern terminus of CR 865 |
| Lee | | 5.060 | 8.143 | I-75 – Naples, Tampa | Exit 141 on I-75 |
| Lee | Fort Myers Shores | 7.746 | 12.466 | SR 31 north – Arcadia | Southern terminus of SR 31 |
| Lee | Fort Myers Shores | | | Buckingham Road (CR 876 west) – Lehigh Acres | Eastern terminus of CR 876 |
| Lee | Alva | 17.151 | 27.602 | Broadway Street to CR 78 – Alva | |
| Lee | Alva | 17.724 | 28.524 | CR 884 west (Joel Boulevard) – Lehigh Acres | Eastern terminus of CR 884 |
| Hendry | | 22.860 | 36.790 | Fort Denaud Road (CR 78A east) – Fort Denaud | Western terminus of CR 78A |
| Hendry | Fort Denaud | 27.325 | 43.975 | Fort Denaud Road (CR 78A west) / Cowboy Way (CR 80A east) | Eastern terminus of CR 78A; western terminus of CR 80A |
| Hendry | LaBelle | 28.450 | 45.786 | Dr. Martin Luther King Jr. Boulevard (CR 731 south) | |
| Hendry | LaBelle | 29.210 | 47.009 | SR 29 south (Main Street) – Immokalee | Western terminus of concurrency with SR 29 |
| Hendry | LaBelle | 29.277 | 47.117 | SR 29 north (Bridge Street) – Palmdale | Eastern terminus of concurrency with SR 29 |
| Hendry | Port LaBelle | 34.230 | 55.088 | CR 80A south (Cowboy Way) | Northern terminus of CR 80A |
| Hendry | | 48.709 | 78.390 | CR 833 south – Big Cypress Seminole Reservation | Northern terminus of CR 833 |
| Hendry | Whidden Corner | 51.677 | 83.166 | US 27 north – Sebring | Interchange; western terminus of concurrency with US 27 |
| Hendry | | 58.096 | 93.496 | CR 720 west | Eastern terminus of CR 720 |
| Hendry | Clewiston | 60.670 | 97.639 | W.C. Owen Avenue (CR 832 east) | Western terminus of CR 832 |
| Hendry | | 62.851 | 101.149 | CR 835 south (Evercane Road) | Northern terminus of CR 835 |
| Palm Beach | South Bay | 76.526 | 123.157 | US 27 south – Fort Lauderdale | Eastern terminus of concurrency with US 27 |
| Palm Beach | Belle Glade | 78.329 | 126.058 | SR 715 north (SW 16th Street) – Pahokee | Southern terminus of SR 715; truck bypass to West Palm Beach, Pahokee, and Canal Point} |
| Palm Beach | Belle Glade | 79.391 | 127.767 | CR 827A south | Northern terminus of CR 827A |
| Palm Beach | Belle Glade | 80.524 | 129.591 | Dr. Martin Luther King Jr. Boulevard (CR 880 east); SR 15 | Former routing of SR 80 until 1989; western terminus of CR 880; southern terminus of SR 15 |
| Palm Beach | Belle Glade | 80.766 | 129.980 | Canal Street South (SR 717) | |
| Palm Beach | | 83.534 | 134.435 | US 98 west / US 441 north / SR 15 north (Hooker Highway) / SR 812 west – Pahokee, Canal Point | Eastern terminus of concurrency with SR 15; western terminus of concurrency with US 98 / US 441; truck bypass to Pahokee, Canal Point, South Bay |
| Palm Beach | | 96.871 | 155.899 | SR 700 west / CR 700 east (Conners Highway) – Canal Point | Eastern terminus of SR 700; western terminus of CR 700 |
| Palm Beach | Twenty Mile Bend | 101.780 | 163.799 | CR 880 west | Former routing of SR 80 until 1989 |
| Palm Beach | Wellington–Royal Palm Beach line | 110.479 | 177.799 | Forest Hill Boulevard / Crestwood Boulevard | To SR 882 |
| Palm Beach | Royal Palm Beach | 113.25 | 182.26 | US 441 south / SR 7 | Interchange; eastern terminus of concurrency with US 441 |
| Palm Beach | | 115.47 | 185.83 | Florida's Turnpike / Pike Road – Miami, Orlando | Southbound Turnpike is accessed via Pike Road; exit 97 on Turnpike |
| Palm Beach | | 116.79 | 187.96 | Jog Road | Interchange |
| Palm Beach | | 118.32– 118.83 | 190.42– 191.24 | SR 809 (Military Trail) / Haverhill Road | Interchange |
| Palm Beach | Glen Ridge | 120.68 | 194.22 | SR 807 south (Congress Avenue) / Australian Avenue (CR 704A north) – President Donald J. Trump International Airport | Interchange; northern terminus of SR 807; southern terminus of CR 704A (former SR 704A) |
| Palm Beach | West Palm Beach | 121.47 | 195.49 | I-95 – Miami, West Palm Beach | Exit 68 on I-95 |
| Palm Beach | West Palm Beach | 122.392 | 196.971 | US 1 (Dixie Highway / SR 805) | |
| Palm Beach | West Palm Beach | 122.538 | 197.206 | SR 5 (Olive Avenue) | |
| Palm Beach | Lake Worth Lagoon | 122.87 | 197.74 | Southern Boulevard Bridge | |
| Palm Beach | Palm Beach | 123.480 | 198.722 | SR A1A (Ocean Boulevard) | Traffic circle; eastern terminus of US 98 |
1.000 mi = 1.609 km; 1.000 km = 0.621 mi: Concurrency terminus; Tolled

== Related roads ==
=== County Road 80A (Hendry County) ===
County Road 80A is the designation for Cowboy Way near LaBelle. It runs from SR 80 just southwest of LaBelle and heads east to SR 29. From SR 29, it continues east through Port LaBelle where it turns north and reconnects to SR 80. Cowboy Way was previously designated at SR 80A between SR 80 and SR 29. SR 80A was eventually turned over to county control, and was extended east to its eastern connection with SR 80 when Port LaBelle was being developed in the 1970s.

=== Former County Road 80A (Lee County) ===
The former CR 80A in Lee County ran between Tice and Olga via Buckingham. It ran along Orange River Boulevard east to Buckingham Road, where it ran north along Buckingham Road back to SR 80. These roads, along with Old Olga Road, were the original alignment of SR 80 in this area prior to the late 1940s. After the current alignment opened, the route became SR 80A. In the 1970s, Orange River Boulevard's intersection with SR 80 near Tice was realigned to its current intersection to accommodate the construction of the interchange with I-75. A portion of the former alignment still exists west of I-75 near Lexington Avenue. The roads were later relinquished to county control and were designated CR 80A. The CR 80A designation has since been decommissioned along the route and Orange River Boulevard now exists without a route designation. Buckingham Road has since become part of CR 876.

=== Former State Road 80B ===
SR 80B was the previous designation for Ortiz Avenue, which runs south from SR 80 in Tice. In its early years, Ortiz Avenue served as a connection between SR 80 and SR 82 east of Fort Myers. In the 1970s, Ortiz Avenue was relinquished to county control and was extended south from SR 82 to just south of the newly-extended Colonial Boulevard (SR 884). Six Mile Cypress Parkway, an extension of SR 865, was built by 1983 connecting to Ortiz Avenue near Colonial Boulevard and was designated as CR 865. The CR 865 designation was also extended to include Ortiz Avenue.
