= List of county roads in Hendry County, Florida =

- County road shields used in Florida

Highway names
- Interstates: Interstate X (I-X)
- US Highways: U.S. Highway X (US X)
- State: State Road X (SR X)
- County: County Road X (CR-X)

System links
- County roads in Florida; County roads in Hendry County

The following is a list of county roads in Hendry County, Florida. All county roads are maintained by the county in which they reside.

== County roads in Hendry County ==
| Route | Road name(s) | From | To | Notes |
|---|---|---|---|---|
| CR 29A | Main Street; Park Avenue | SR 29 / SR 80 in LaBelle | SR 29 / Park Avenue in LaBelle | Former SR 29A |
| CR 78 | | CR 78 at the Lee County line east of Alva | SR 29 north of LaBelle | Former SR 78 |
| CR Old 78 | Old CR 78 | CR 78 north of LaBelle | SR 29 north of LaBelle | |
| CR 78A | Ft. Denaud Road; Ft. Denaud Bridge Way | SR 80 southwest of Fort Denaud | CR 78 west of Fort Denaud | Former SR 78A |
| CR 80A | Cowboy Way Old US 27 | SR 80 / Ft. Denaud Road in LaBelle US 27 (SR 25) / SR 80 north-northeast of Hooker Point | SR 29 / West Cowboy Way in LaBelle Old US 27 at the Palm Beach County line east-southeast of Hooker Point | Former SR 80A |
| CR 720 | | US 27 (SR 25) / SR 80 west of Clewiston | CR 720 at the Glades County line west-northwest of Clewiston | Former SR 720 |
| CR 731 | Dr. Martin Luther King Jr. Boulevard | CR 80A / Barbara Street in LaBelle | SR 80 / Shady Oaks Avenue in LaBelle | Former SR 731 |
| CR 830 | | SR 29 in Felda | Dead end at an abandoned railroad line southeast of Felda | Former SR 830 |
| CR 830A | | SR 29 / Heritage Road in Felda | CR 830 southeast of Felda | Former SR 830A |
| CR 832 | Keri Road 9th Street; Harlem Academy Avenue; 13th Street; Della Tobias Avenue; 7th Street; Georgia Avenue; W.C. Owens Avenue; Sonora Avenue; Davidson Road; Hookers Point Road W.C. Owens Avenue Francisco Street | SR 29 southwest of the Okaloacoochee Slough Wildlife Management Area north of Felda CR 832 in Harlem CR 832 in Clewiston CR 832 in Clewiston | CR 833 in Devils Garden CR 80A east-southeast of Hooker Point US 27 (SR 25) / SR 80 / W.C. Owens Avenue in Clewiston Francisco Street / Hoover Dike Road in Clewiston | Former SR 832 |
| CR 833 | Josie Billie Highway; Sam Jones Trail | Josie Billie Highway at the Big Cypress Indian Reservation south-southeast of Point of Cypress | SR 80 east-southeast of Woodyard Hammock | Former SR 833 |
| CR 835 | Evercane Road | CR 833 east-southeast of Point of Cypress | US 27 (SR 25) / SR 80 northeast of Hooker Point | Former SR 832 and SR 846 |
| CR 846 | | CR 846 at the Collier County line west-southwest of Point of Cypress | CR 833 northwest of Point of Cypress | Former SR 846 |
