= Billy's Creek Bridge =

Bridge in Florida, United States of America

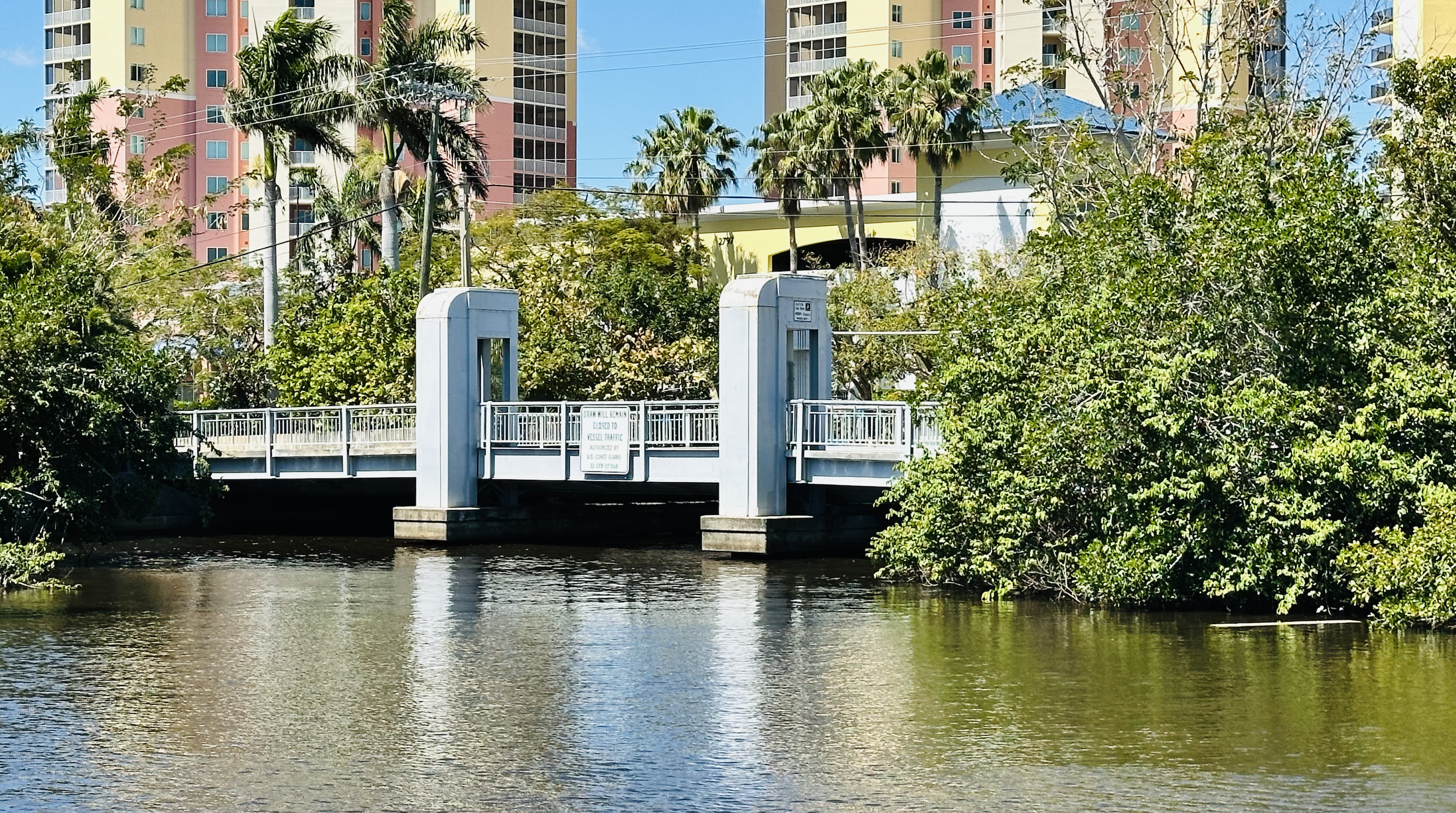
- Coordinates: 26.6517°N 81.8567°W
- Carries: First Street/Palm Beach Boulevard
- Crosses: Billy's Creek
- Locale: Fort Myers, Florida
- Maintained by: Florida Department of Transportation

Characteristics
- Design: Vertical-lift bridge

History
- Opened: 1941

Location
- Interactive map of Billy's Creek Bridge

The Billy's Creek Bridge is a historic vertical-lift bridge located just east of downtown Fort Myers, Florida. It carries a road previously part of State Road 80 (known as Palm Beach Boulevard on the west side and First Street on the east side) across Billy's Creek.

The bridge was built in 1941. As a vertical lift bridge, it has four short towers that house the lift mechanisms, which is a unique design for lift bridges. The bridge has the distinction of being both the smallest vertical lift bridge in Florida and the only hydraulically-powered vertical lift bridge in Florida. The lift has not been operational since 1987. The bridge was rehabilitated in 2013.

The road and bridge carried westbound traffic only from the late 1980s until 2023. While the road crossing the bridge is now under city control, the bridge is still maintained by the Florida Department of Transportation.
