= County Road 833 (Florida) =

Road in Florida, United States

County Road 833

Route information
- Maintained by Broward Public Works and Hendry County R&BD
- Length: 53.7 mi (86.4 km)

Major junctions
- South end: I-75 Toll in Miccosukee Indian Reservation
- CR 846 in Hendry County
- East end: SR 80 near Moore Haven

Location
- Country: United States
- State: Florida
- Counties: Broward, Hendry

Highway system
- County roads in Florida

County Road 833 (CR 833) is a 53-mile-long (85 km) county road near the Florida Everglades. Located in Broward and Hendry counties, it connects Miccosukee Indian Reservation and the Big Cypress Indian Reservation with agricultural land south of Lake Okeechobee. It is known as Snake Road in the Miccosukee Indian Reservation, Josie Billie Highway in the Big Cypress Indian Reservation, and Sam Jones Trail in unincorporated Hendry County. CR 833 was previously designated State Road 833 (SR 833).

== Route description ==
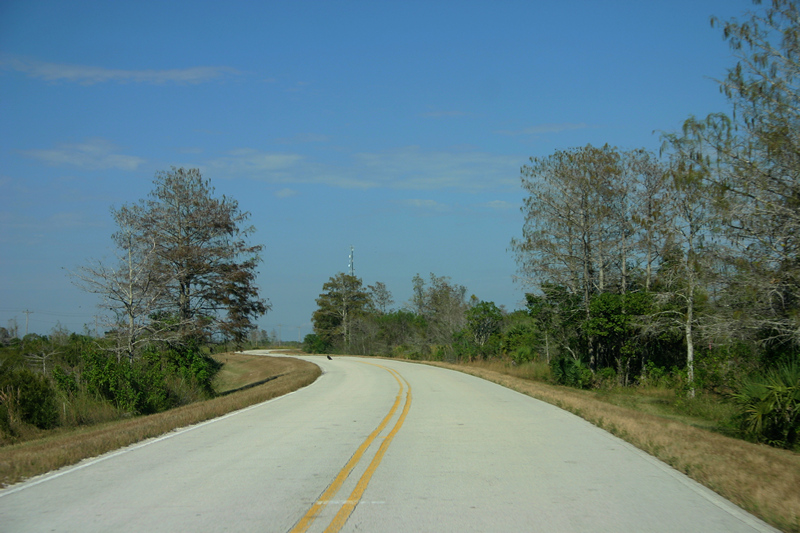
CR 833 in Broward County

CR 833 begins in western Broward County at a diamond interchange with the Alligator Alley segment of Interstate 75 (I-75) in the Miccosukee Indian Reservation. On the northeast corner of the interchange is the Miccosukee Service Plaza which is the only service plaza on the entire 75-mile (121 km) stretch of Alligator Alley.

From the interchange and the service plaza, CR 833 heads north as Snake Road through the Miccosukee Indian Reservation. The road is named Snake Road since it snakes back and forth through the Miccosukee Reservation. Six miles (9.7 km) later, CR 833 enters the Big Cypress Indian Reservation, one of the reservations of the Seminole Tribe of Florida. From here, the road is known as Josie Billie Highway. It then continues north another two miles (3.2 km) before turning west and entering Hendry County while still in the reservation.

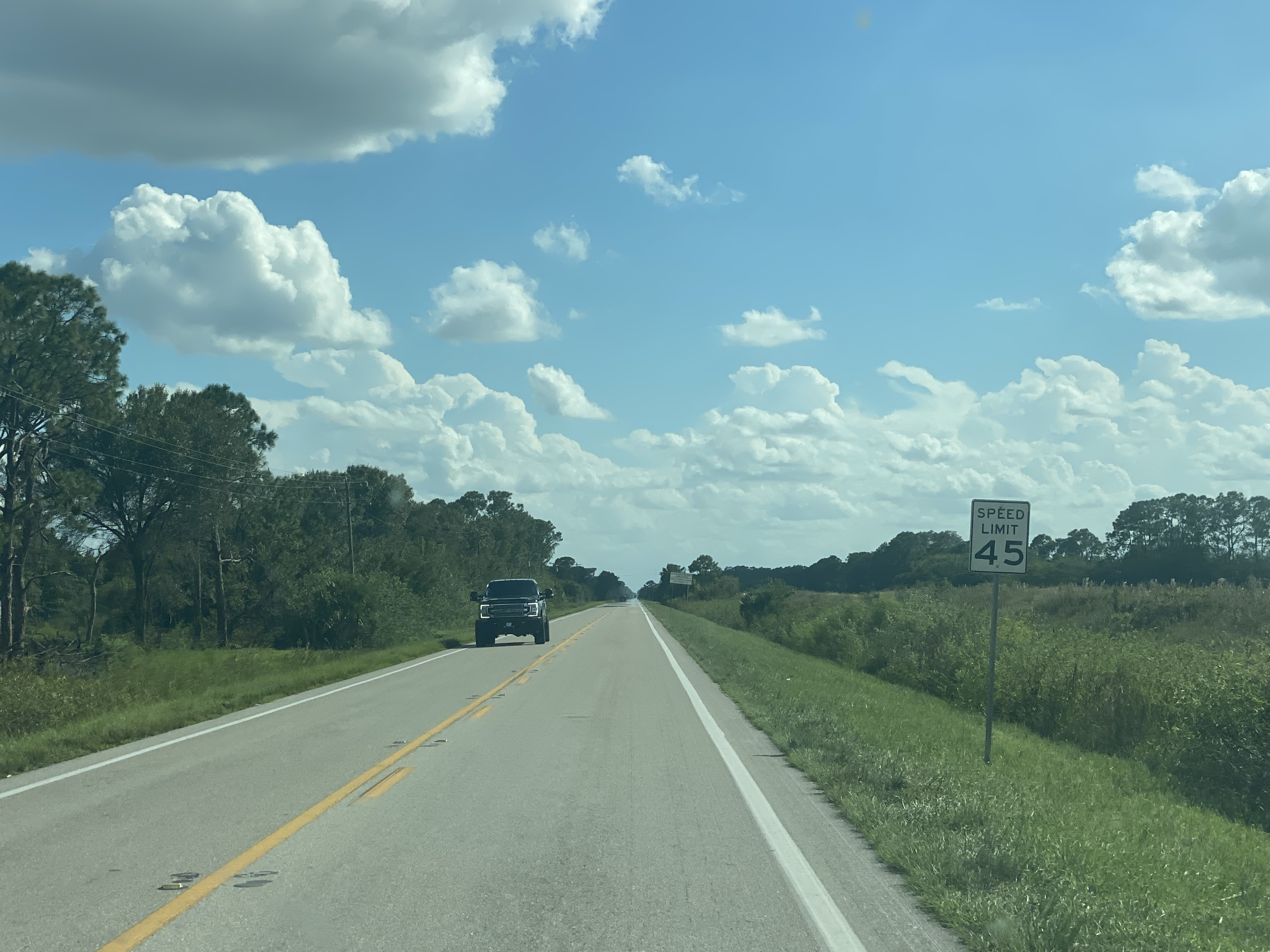
CR 833 in Montura, Hendry County

Once in Hendry County, CR 833 continues west another seven miles (11 km) through the center of the reservation before turning north. It then exits the reservation one mile (1.6 km) later and enters unincorporated Hendry County, where it is known as Sam Jones Trail.

As it winds through Hendry County, it intersects with CR 835 (Evercane Road) which heads northeast to Clewiston and CR 846 which heads west to Immokalee. From CR 846, CR 833 continues north passing Dinner Island Ranch Wildlife Management Area and Montura, where its name changes again to Devils Garden Street, before coming to its northern terminus at State 80 (SR 80) just west of Clewiston.

== History ==
CR 833 was previously designated SR 833. It was largely built from its northern terminus to the Big Cypress Indian Reservation in 1950. This segment of the route closely follows a path used by the Seminole and Miccosukee Indians to flee into the Florida Everglades during the Third Seminole War. They were led by Abiaka, also known as Sam Jones, to land close to the present-day Big Cypress Indian Reservation. This segment of the road was officially named Sam Jones Trail in 2015.

Within the Big Cypress Indian Reservation, the road is named Josie Billie Highway. It is named for Josie Billie, a medicine man who lived on the reservation and was a public spokesman for the Seminole Tribe of Florida.

In 1970, SR 833 was extended from the Big Cypress Indian Reservation south through the Miccosukee Indian Reservation to Alligator Alley, which at the time was a two-lane toll road designated SR 84. SR 833 became CR 833 in the early 1980s when it was relinquished to county control.

In 1987, the Florida Department of Transportation (FDOT) began upgrading Alligator Alley to Interstate Highway standards as part of the extension of I-75. CR 833's intersection with Alligator Alley was rebuilt into a diamond interchange as part of the upgrade to I-75. At the same time, construction began on a service plaza at CR 833 and Alligator Alley. The service plaza opened in 1989 and is operated by the Miccosukee. The plaza remains the only service plaza with food and gas along the 75-mile (121 km) Alligator Alley segment of I-75.

== Major intersections ==
County	Location	mi	km	Destinations	Notes
Broward	Miccosukee Indian Reservation	0.0	0.0	I-75 Toll (SR 93) – Naples, Miami	Exit 49 on I-75
Hendry		25.5	41.0	CR 835 north (Evercane Road) – Clewiston	
Hendry		33.5	53.9	CR 846 west – Immokalee	
Hendry	Montura	43.7	70.3	CR 832 west	
Hendry		53.7	86.4	SR 80 – LaBelle, Clewiston	
1.000 mi = 1.609 km; 1.000 km = 0.621 mi
