= Edison Bridge (Florida) =

Bridge in United States of America

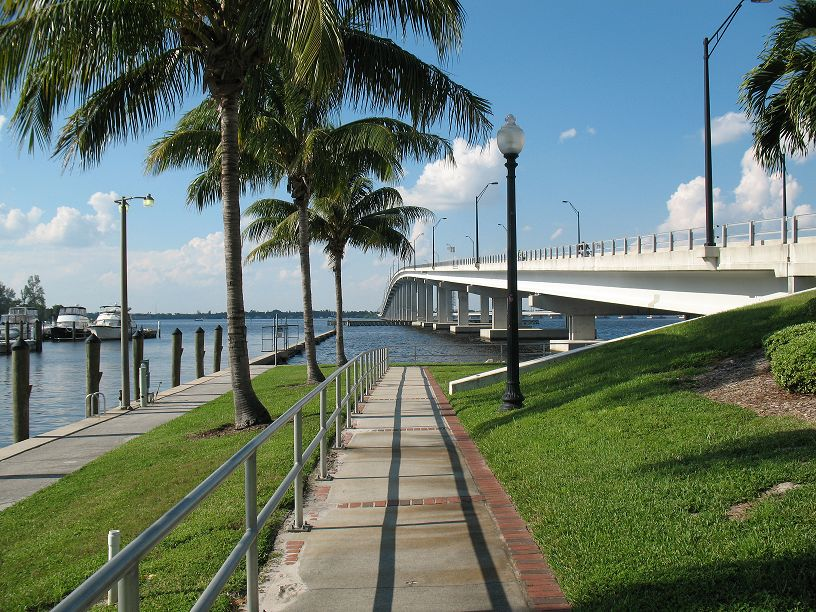
- Coordinates: 26°39′1.97″N 81°52′7.82″W
- Carries: US 41 Bus.
- Crosses: Caloosahatchee River
- Locale: Fort Myers and North Fort Myers, Florida
- Official name: Thomas A. Edison Bridge
- Named for: Thomas Edison
- Owner: Florida Department of Transportation
- Maintained by: Florida Department of Transportation
- ID number: 120157 (northbound); 120158 (southbound)

Characteristics
- Design: Concrete girder
- Clearance below: 55 feet (17 m)
- No. of lanes: 2

History
- Opened: Original Bridge: February 11, 1931; 95 years ago; Current Bridges: 1992 (Northbound); 1993 (Southbound)

Statistics
- Daily traffic: 16,000 (northbound, 2017); 16,500 (southbound, 2017)
- Toll: None

Location
- Interactive map of Edison Bridge

The Edison Bridge is a set of two one-way bridges located in Fort Myers, Florida. Named after inventor Thomas Alva Edison, the two bridges carry each direction of U.S. Highway 41 Business (US 41 Bus.) over the Caloosahatchee River, connecting downtown Fort Myers (on the southern shore) with North Fort Myers.

The two bridges each have three lanes and are 55 feet (17 m) tall. They land at the same point on the north side of the river but are separated by a few blocks on the south side since US 41 Bus. runs on two separate one-way streets in Downtown Fort Myers. When looking on a map, the two spans and the south bank of the river form a right triangle. The two bridges were built in the early 1990s, replacing a single two-lane drawbridge which also bore the name Edison Bridge. The original bridge, which was located on the site of the southbound span, was once part of Tamiami Trail.

== History ==
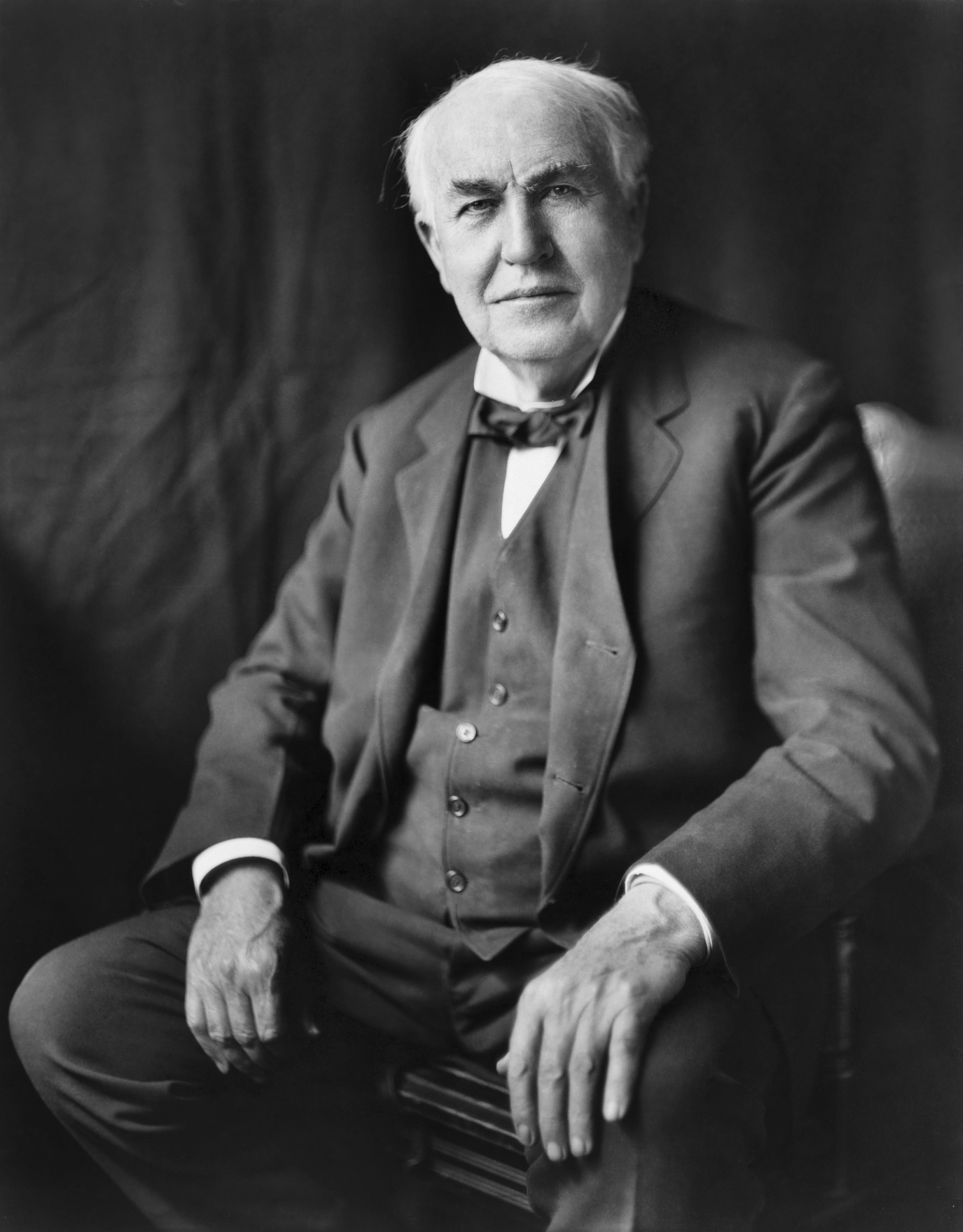
Thomas Alva Edison

The original Edison Bridge opened for traffic on February 11, 1931, the 84th birthday of its namesake Thomas Edison. Edison, who had a winter home in Fort Myers, dedicated the bridge, and was also the first to drive across it.

The original Edison Bridge was built to carry Tamiami Trail, which had previously crossed the river on a bridge in East Fort Myers. This bridge, sometimes referred to as the East End Bridge, opened on March 12, 1924 and was a narrow wooden bridge with an iron swing span. It crossed the river at Freemont Street and connected to present-day Old Bridge Road in North Fort Myers. Construction of the East End Bridge was initially started by a private company with the intention of making it a toll bridge. Lee County planned to use the East End Bridge as a temporary river crossing for the planned Tamiami Trail, but the federal government would not designate it as part of a U.S. Highway if the bridge had a toll. So, the county purchased the bridge and completed its construction.

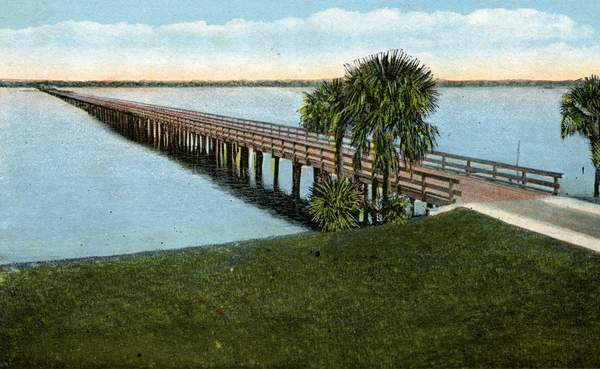
Postcard of the East End Bridge, which previously carried Tamiami Trail

The East End Bridge was only intended to be a temporary crossing of the Caloosahatchee River for Tamiami Trail because it was too far east of Downtown Fort Myers and was too narrow, making passing difficult. A couple of locations were determined as potential sites for a permanent bridge, including Carson Street west of downtown (which would become the location of the Caloosahatchee Bridge years later). But it was ultimately decided that a new bridge, which would become the Edison Bridge, would connect Fowler Street (east of downtown) with a rerouted portion of Tamiami Trail (US 41) on the north side. After the Edison Bridge opened, the East End Bridge was closed to vehicular traffic and was later used as a fishing pier. The bridge's iron swing span subsequently was sold to Collier County where it operated on the original Goodland Bridge on Marco Island from 1936 to 1975. The East End Bridge's remaining wooden structure was destroyed by a fire in 1940.

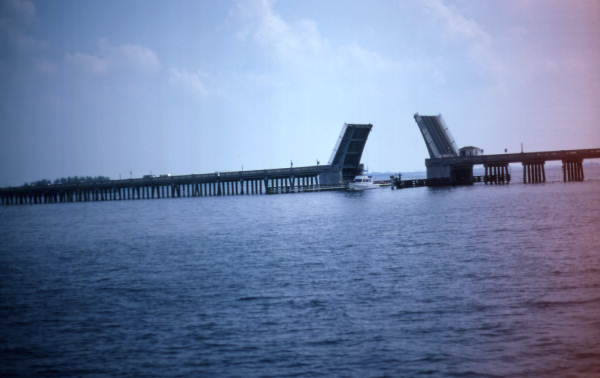
Original Edison Bridge in 1983

The original Edison Bridge carried US 41 from its opening in 1931 up until 1964, when the Caloosahatchee Bridge, a new four-lane high-level fixed bridge, opened just downstream on the other side of downtown. US 41 was rerouted onto the new structure, bypassing downtown Fort Myers. The route over the Edison Bridge was redesignated as US 41 Bus., but is still considered part of Tamiami Trail.

The original Edison Bridge was replaced with the current dual high-level bridge spans in the early 1990s. The northbound span opened in 1992, and the southbound span opened in 1993. The current bridges are 55 feet (17 m) tall, which eliminated the need for a drawbridge, and carry a combined six lanes across the river. The alignment of the two spans is similar to that of the Barron Collier Bridge and the Gilchrist Bridge, which carry US 41 over the Peace River just to the north in Punta Gorda.

== Gallery ==
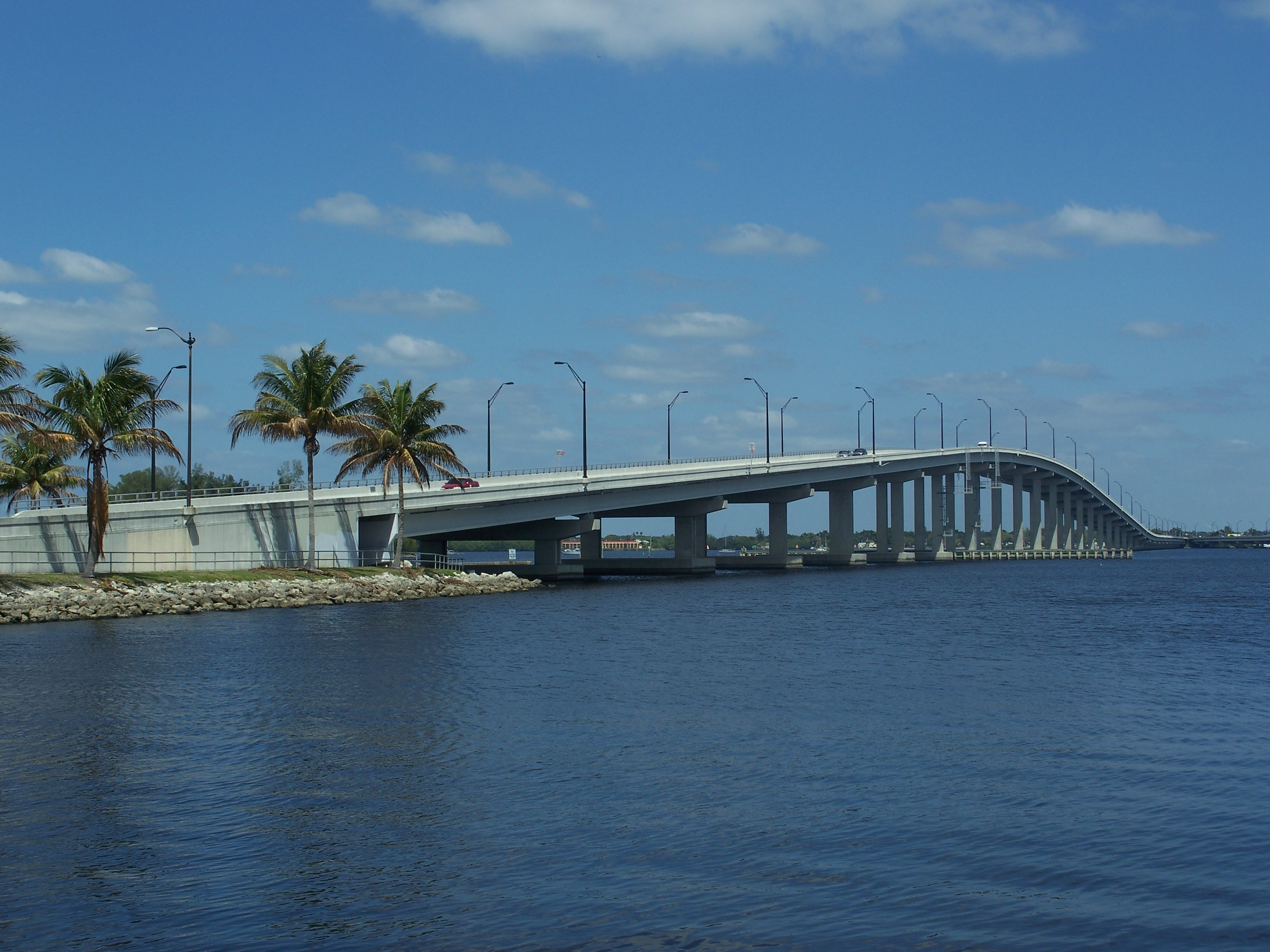
The southbound span

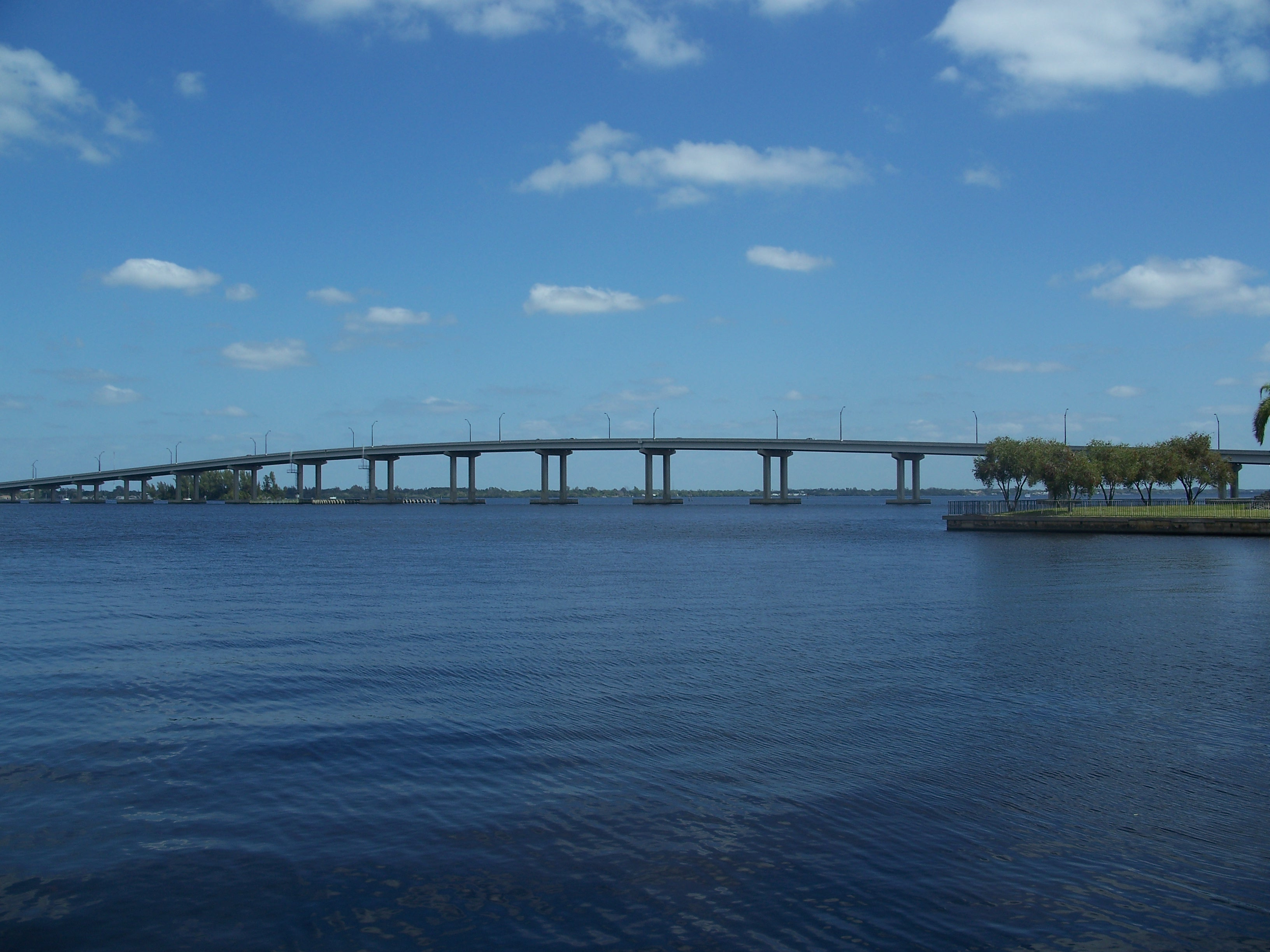
The northbound span

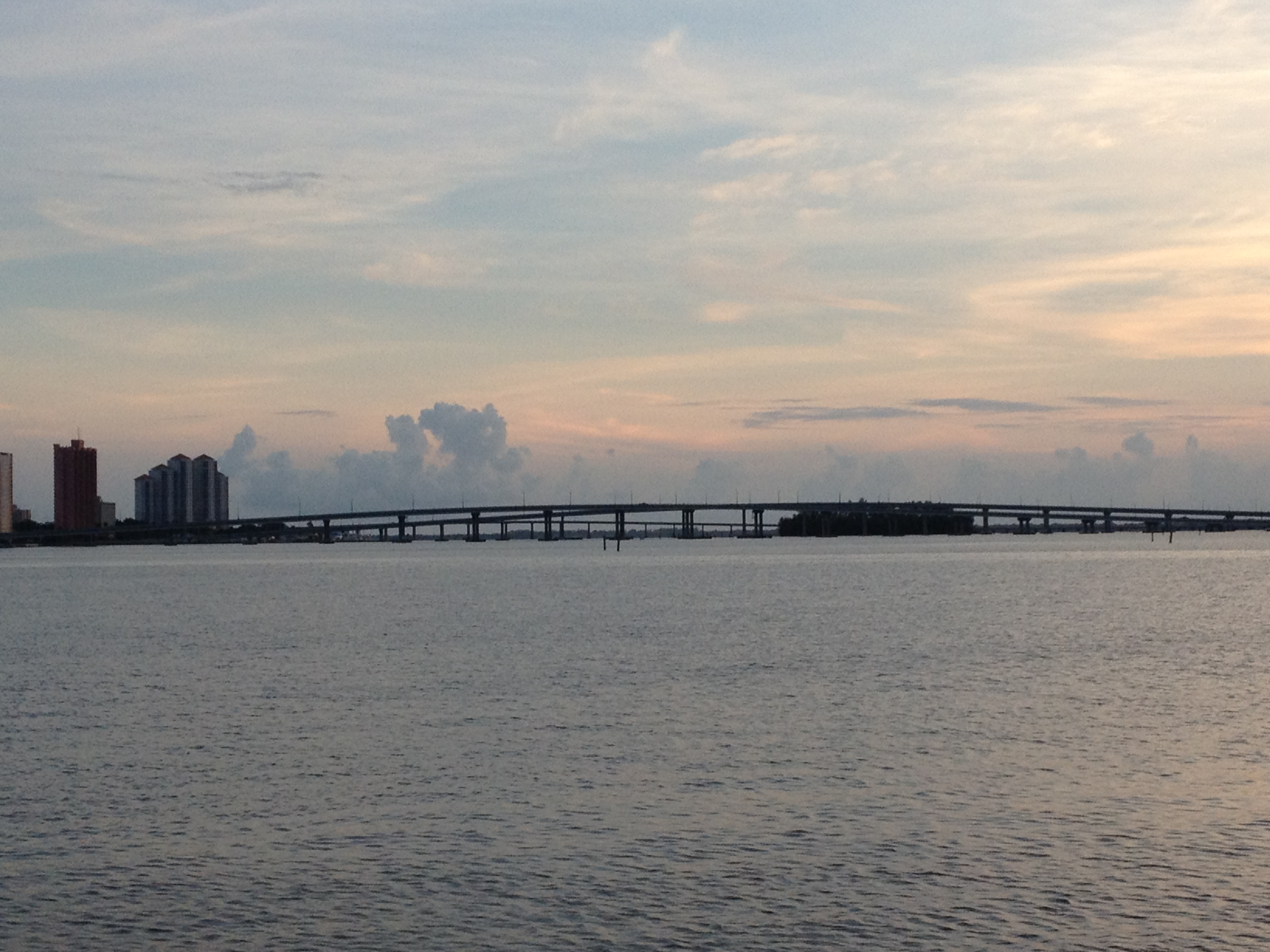
The bridges at sunset as seen from the Riverside Park pier

== See also ==
- List of crossings of the Caloosahatchee River
