= Caloosahatchee Bridge =

Bridge in Fort Myers, Florida, United States

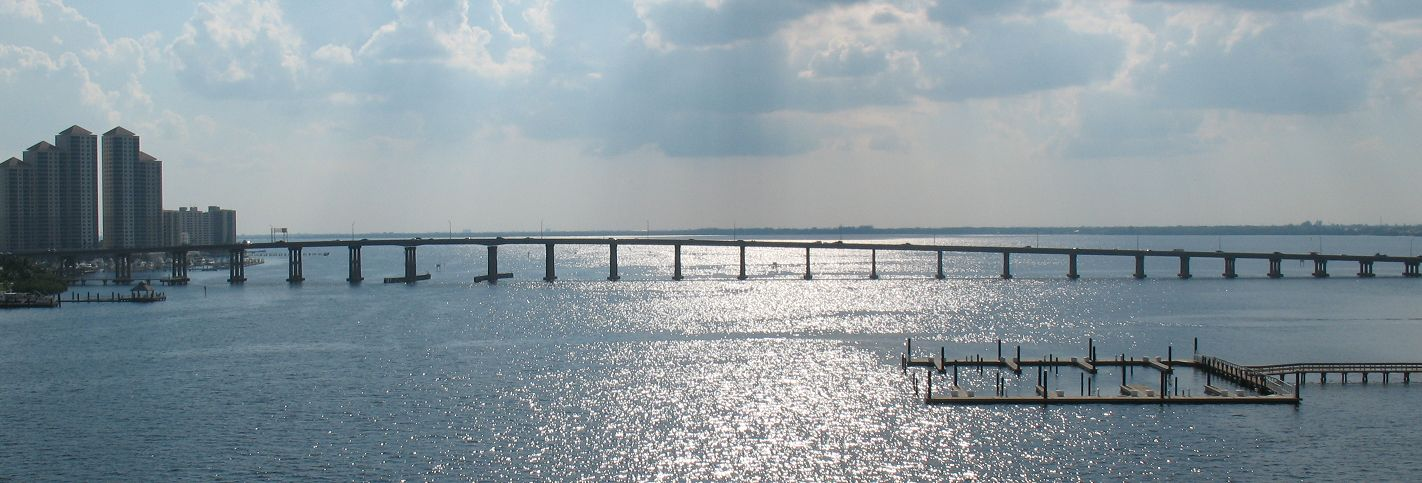
- Coordinates: 26°38′45.59″N 81°52′29.67″W
- Carries: US 41 / SR 45 / Cleveland Avenue
- Crosses: Caloosahatchee River
- Locale: Fort Myers and North Fort Myers, Florida
- Other name(s): US 41 Bridge, Henry Ford Bridge
- Named for: Caloosahatchee River
- Maintained by: Florida Department of Transportation
- ID number: 120002

Characteristics
- Design: Concrete girder bridge
- Clearance below: 55 ft (16.8 m)

History
- Opened: 1964; 62 years ago

Statistics
- Toll: None

Location
- Interactive map of Caloosahatchee Bridge

The Caloosahatchee Bridge is a bridge located in Fort Myers, Florida. It carries U.S. Highway 41 (US 41, locally known as Cleveland Avenue) over the Caloosahatchee River, which is where its name comes from. The bridge has four lanes and is 55 feet (17 m) tall.

== History ==
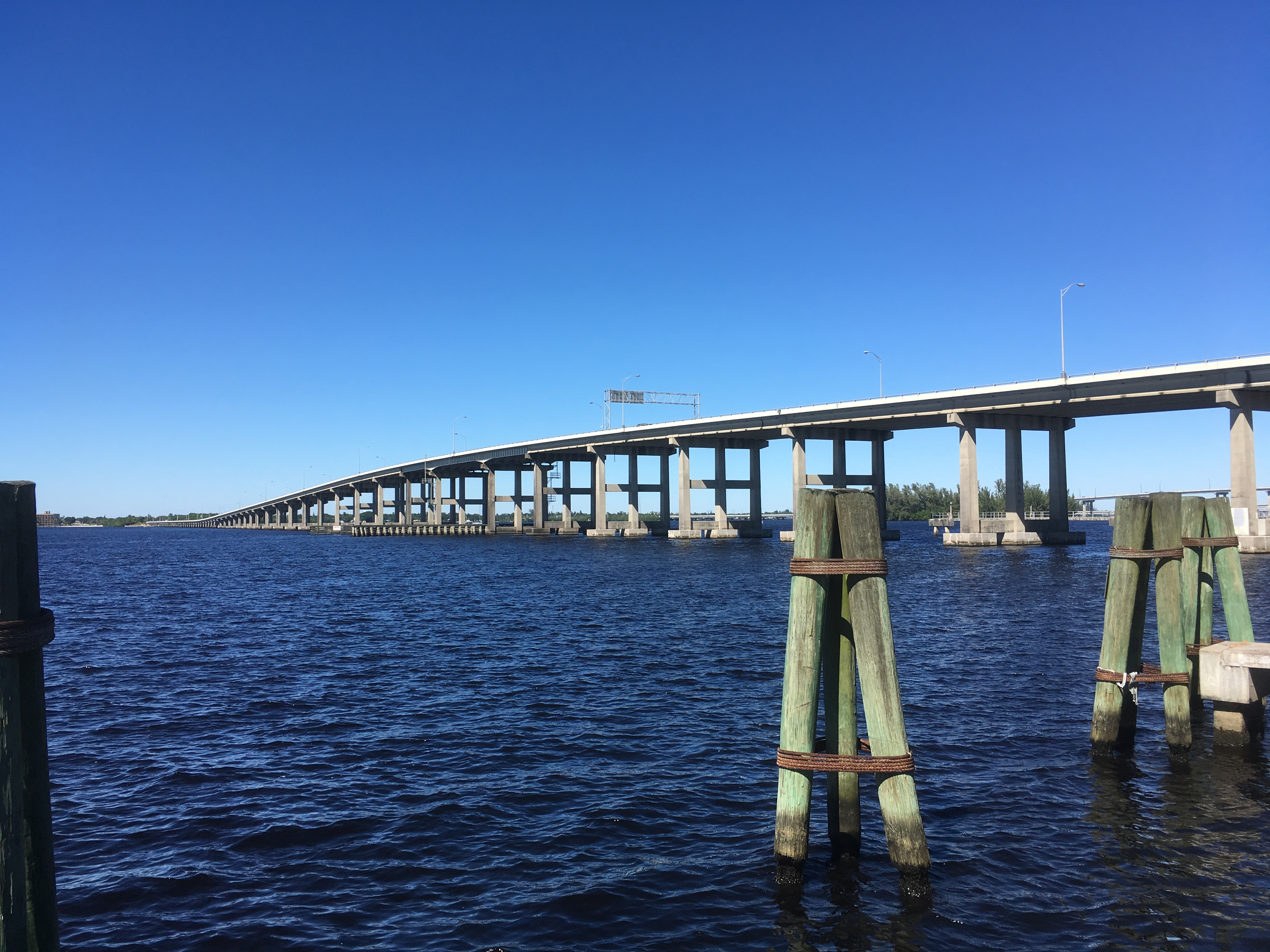
Caloosahatchee Bridge as seen from Centennial Park

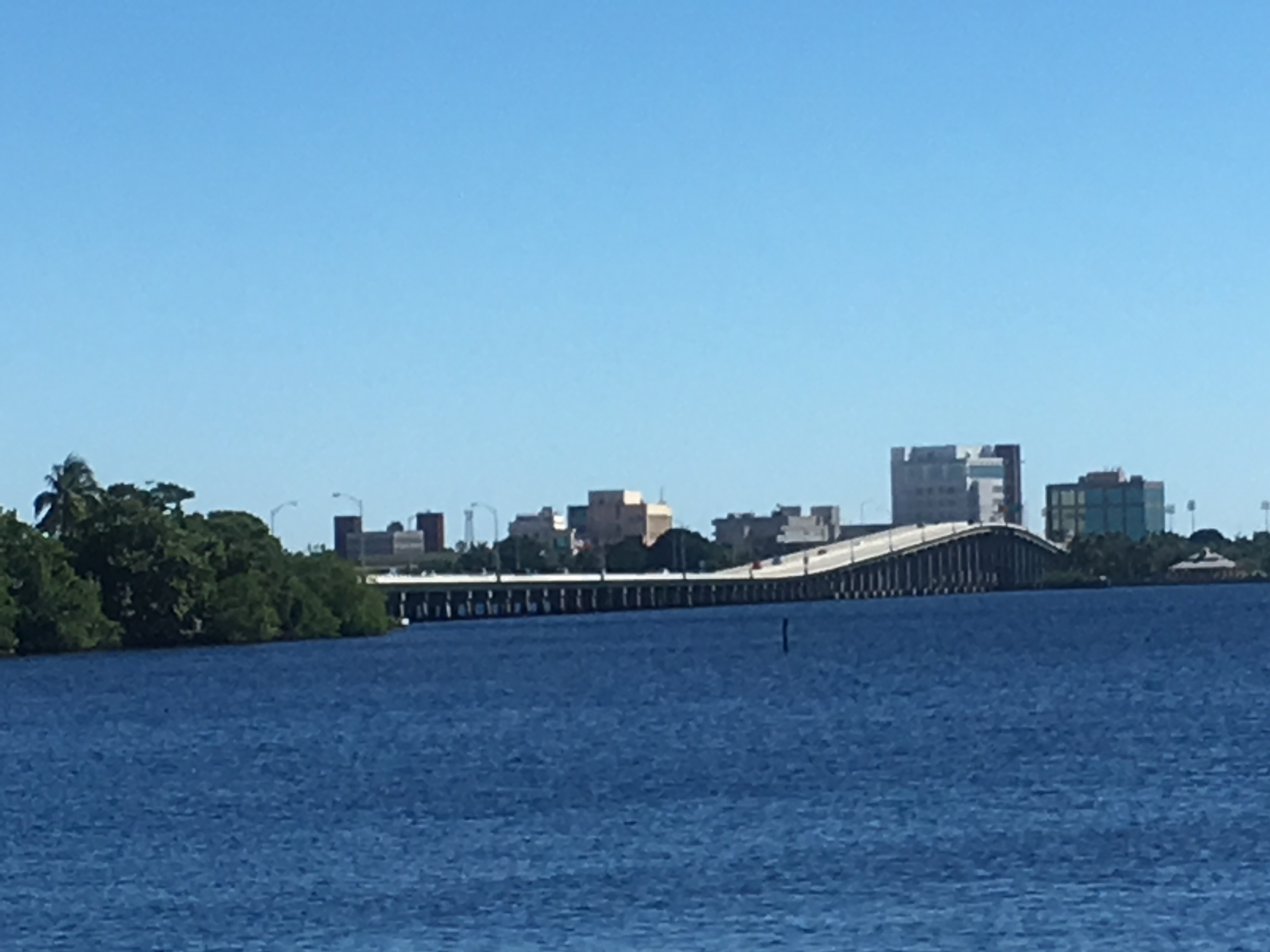
Caloosahatchee Bridge as seen from North Fort Myers

The Caloosahatchee Bridge was built in 1962 but it did not open for traffic until 1964. The bridge's opening was delayed due to difficult negotiations with landowners at the south side over land needed to connect the bridge to Cleveland Avenue.

The opening of the bridge changed the routing of US 41 to bypass downtown Fort Myers. Originally, US 41 went through downtown Fort Myers via Carson Street and First Street, and crossed the Caloosahatchee River on the Edison Bridge, which at the time was a two-lane drawbridge. The old route was then designated as the US 41 Business.

The south side of the bridge passes over Centennial Park, as well as First Street, the main road through downtown Fort Myers. A loop ramp connects the southbound lanes of the bridge to First Street. Directly south of the bridge is US 41's intersection with McGregor Boulevard, SR 80, and SR 82. Each of these highways terminate at this intersection. A two-lane overpass constructed with the Caloosahatchee Bridge crosses this intersection, which is historically known as the Five Points interchange, since it is a five-way interchange. The overpass originally carried both northbound and southbound traffic from the bridge, but was changed to have both lanes carry northbound traffic in the early 1990s.

In March 2024, the Florida Department of Transportation began a project to add a pedestrian pathway to the bridge. FDOT is installing an 8 ft (2.4 m) long side bridge in the center with a single median barrier and restriping the lanes. Originally, FDOT closed a single lane in each direction to allow for construction and the continuation of traffic, a process which would cause the project to take a year to finish. In May, FDOT altered its plans in order to speed up the project and closed the bridge starting on May 31 to traffic, with exception only for emergency evacuations, bringing the expected completion date to August 11, 2024.

== Honorary designation ==
As part of the adoption of HB 7149 in the 2014 Florida Senate session (Chapter 2014-228), the bridge, effective July 1, 2014, received the honorary designation of Henry Ford Bridge. However, per the adopted bill, the designation does not change its official name (Caloosahatchee Bridge) and the local government is not required to change signage to the honorary designation. The City of Fort Myers opted to not rename the bridge.

== See also ==
- List of crossings of the Caloosahatchee River
