= Fort Denaud Bridge =

Bridge in Florida, United States of America

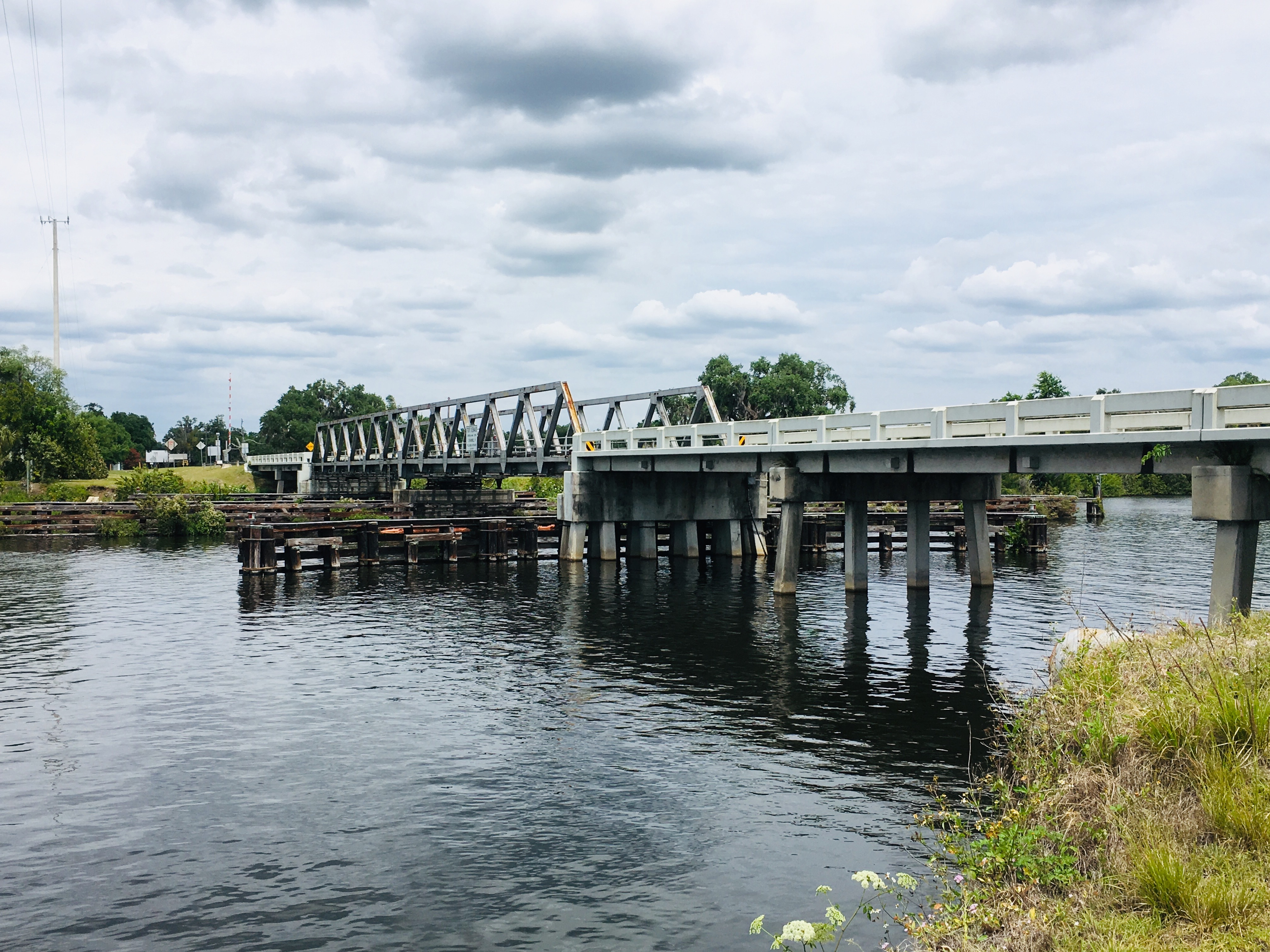
- Coordinates: 26.744638°N 81.510457°W
- Carries: CR 78A (Fort Denaud Bridge Way)
- Crosses: Caloosahatchee River
- Locale: Fort Denaud, Florida
- Owner: Hendry County
- Maintained by: Hendry County
- ID number: 070013

Characteristics
- Design: Swing bridge
- Material: Steel
- Trough construction: Steel
- Pier construction: Concrete
- Total length: 434.7 ft (132 m)
- Clearance below: 8.9 ft (3 m)
- No. of lanes: 2

History
- Opened: 1963

Statistics
- Toll: None

The Fort Denaud Bridge is a historic swing bridge located in Fort Denaud, Florida, a small community in Hendry County between Alva and LaBelle. The bridge crosses the Caloosahatchee River and is one of three vehicle swing bridges in Southwest Florida along with the Blackburn Point Bridge in Osprey and the Boca Grande Causeway.

The bridge was built in 1963 to replace a bridge located a short distance upstream that had been condemned and demolished in the early 1960s.

The bridge is 434.7 feet long from end to end and has a vertical clearance of 8.9 feet over the river.

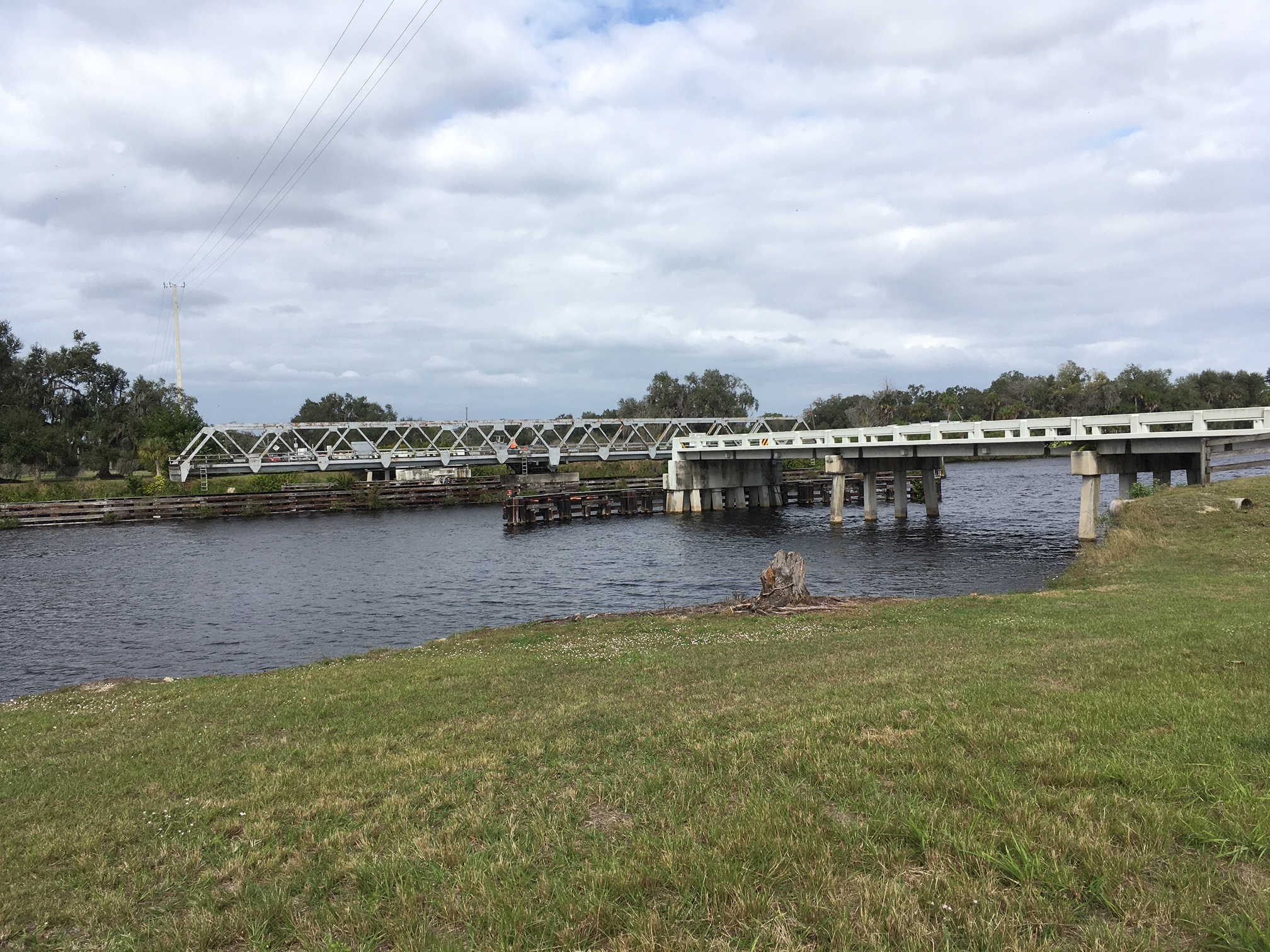
Swing open for vessel traffic
