= Montura, Florida =

- Census-designated place
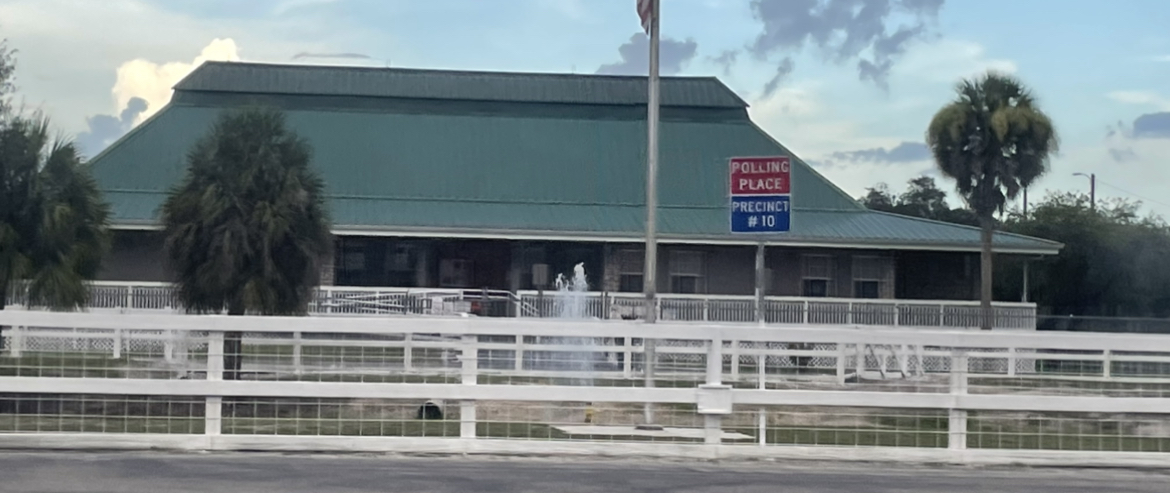
- The clubhouse in Montura Ranch Estates (a private community in Montura).

- Montura in Hendry County
- Coordinates: 26°38′20″N 81°06′32″W
- Country: United States
- State: Florida
- County: Hendry
- Established: 1970

Area
  - Total: 22.34 sq mi (57.85 km^{2})
  - Land: 22.34 sq mi (57.85 km^{2})
  - Water: 0 sq mi (0.00 km^{2})
- Elevation: 23 ft (7.0 m)

Population (2020)
  - Total: 3,343
  - Density: 149.7/sq mi (57.79/km^{2})
- Time zone: UTC-5 (Eastern (EST))
  - Summer (DST): UTC-4 (EDT)
- ZIP code: 33440
- Area code: 863
- GNIS feature ID: 2583364

Montura is an unincorporated community and census-designated place in Hendry County, Florida, United States. Montura had a population of 3,343 at the 2020 census, up from 3,283 at the 2010 census.

== Geography ==
According to the U.S. Census Bureau, the community has an area of 22.379 square miles (57.96 km^{2}), all of it land.

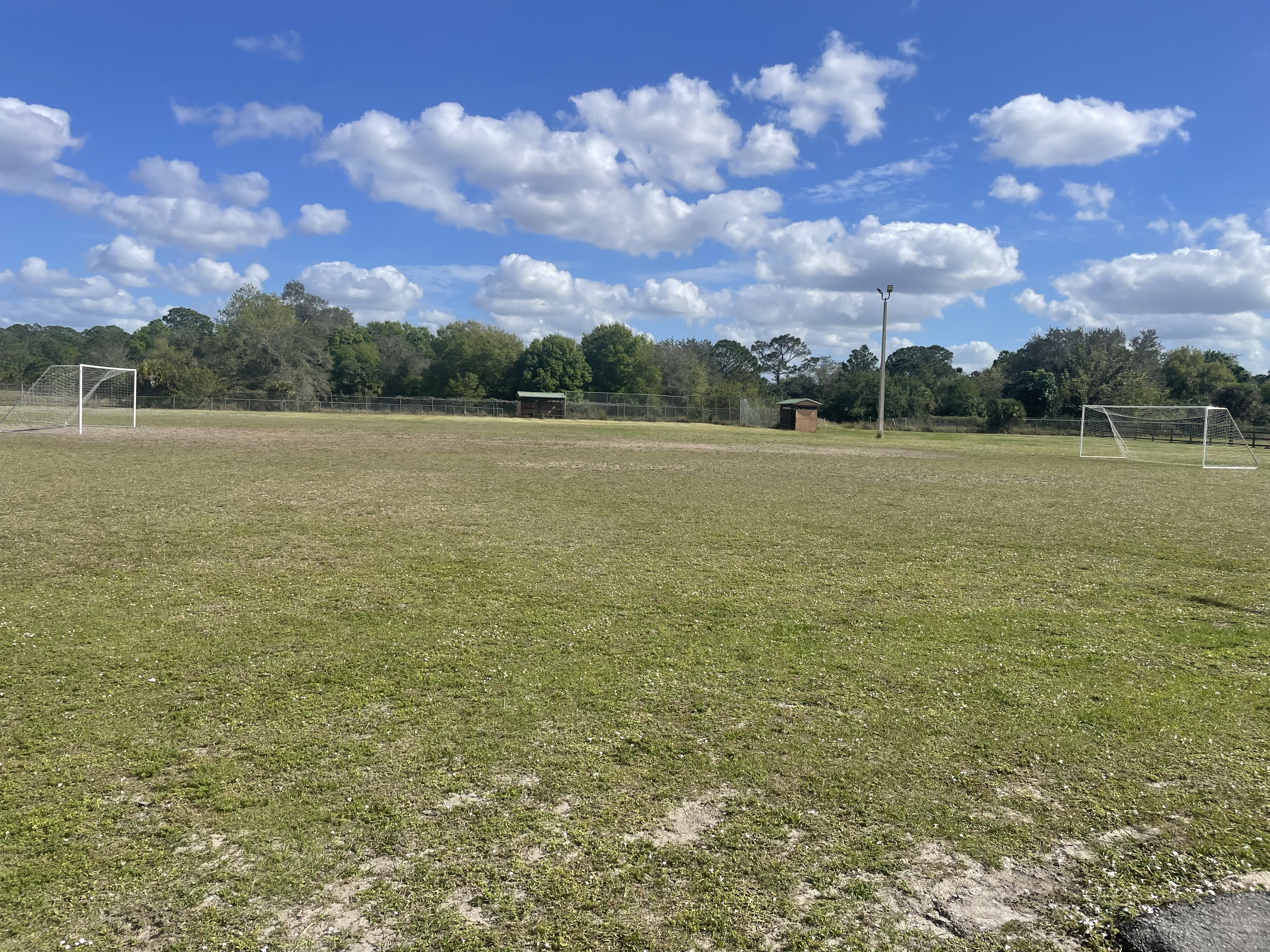
Soccer field and baseball field at the Montura Ranch Estates Clubhouse

In Montura Ranch Estates (includes the majority of Montura) there’s the Montura Ranch Estates Clubhouse at 255 N. Hacienda St. The clubhouse has 2 playgrounds (one for toddlers, one for kids 8-12), a soccer field, a swing set, and a volleyball court all open from 10:00 AM – 6:00 PM (EST). It also has 2 basketball courts, a soccer field, and a baseball field open all hours.

== Demographics ==
Historical population
Census	Pop.	Note	%±
2010	3,283		—
2020	3,343		1.8%
U.S. Decennial Census

Montura first appeared as a census designated place in the 2010 U.S. census.

=== 2020 census ===
As of the 2020 census, Montura had a population of 3,343. The median age was 41.9 years. 24.3% of residents were under the age of 18 and 16.4% were 65 years of age or older. For every 100 females, there were 107.6 males, and for every 100 females age 18 and over, there were 110.5 males age 18 and over.

0.0% of residents lived in urban areas, while 100.0% lived in rural areas.

There were 1,142 households, of which 32.6% had children under the age of 18 living in them. Of all households, 44.9% were married-couple households, 23.2% were households with a male householder and no spouse or partner present, and 21.5% were households with a female householder and no spouse or partner present. About 21.0% of households were made up of individuals, and 9.7% had someone living alone who was 65 years of age or older.

There were 1,344 housing units, of which 15.0% were vacant. The homeowner vacancy rate was 2.6%, and the rental vacancy rate was 1.8%.

Racial composition as of the 2020 census
Race	Number	Percent
White	1,641	49.1%
Black or African American	64	1.9%
American Indian and Alaska Native	45	1.3%
Asian	2	0.1%
Native Hawaiian and Other Pacific Islander	0	0.0%
Some other race	711	21.3%
Two or more races	880	26.3%
Hispanic or Latino (of any race)	2,469	73.9%

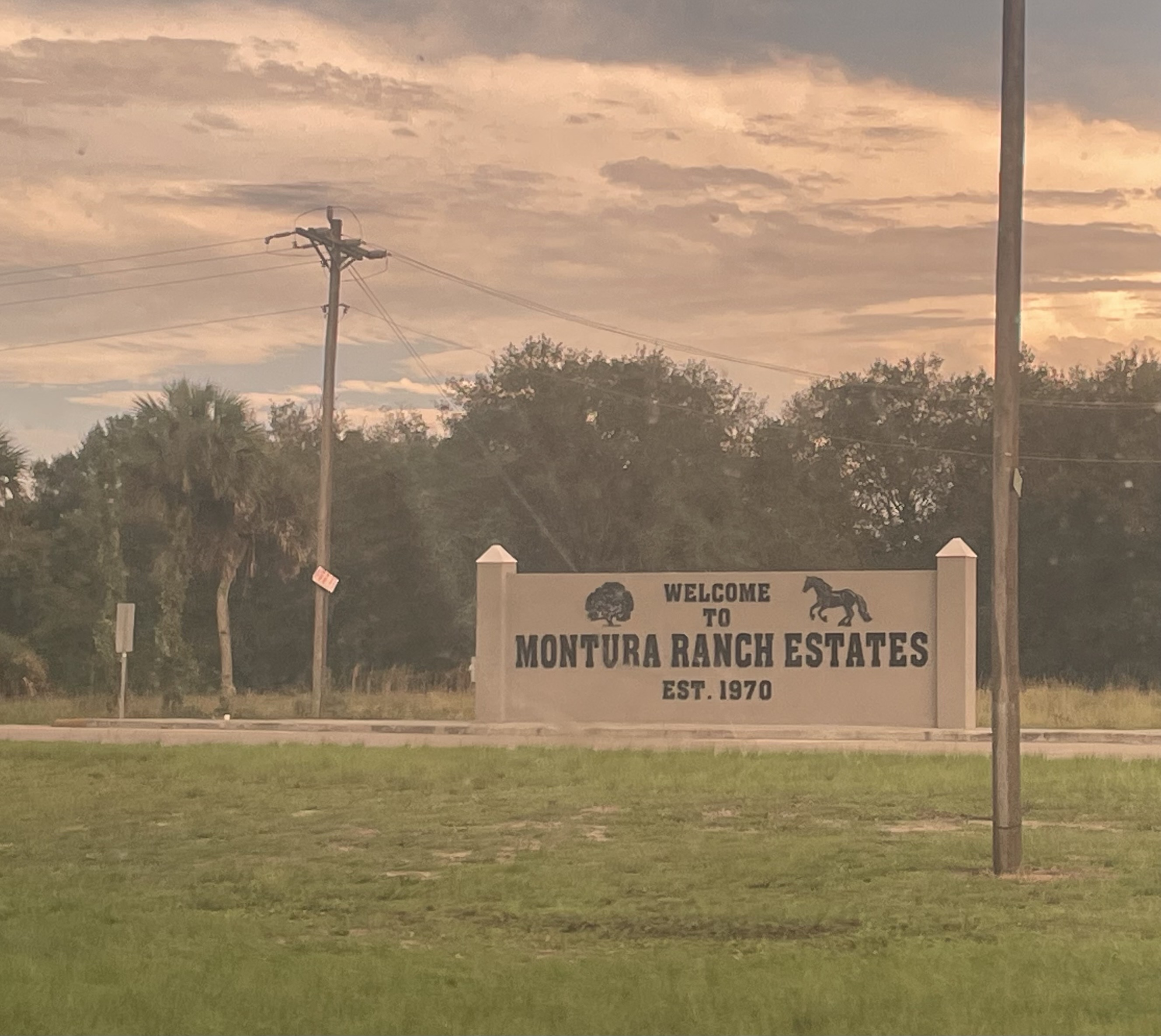
Montura's welcome sign.
