= Felda, Florida =

Unincorporated community in Florida, U.S.

Location of Felda in Florida

Felda is an unincorporated community in Hendry County, Florida, United States, located east of Fort Myers, on State Road 29. The name is a portmanteau of Felix and Ida Taylor's first names.

== Geography ==
Felda is located at 26°32′23″N 81°26′08″W, on the Florida State Road 29, and is north of Immokalee.

== Economy ==
The area was once known for its tomato and cucumber production.

== See also ==
- List of geographic names derived from portmanteaus
- Tomato production in Florida
