= Fort Denaud, Florida =

- Census-designated place
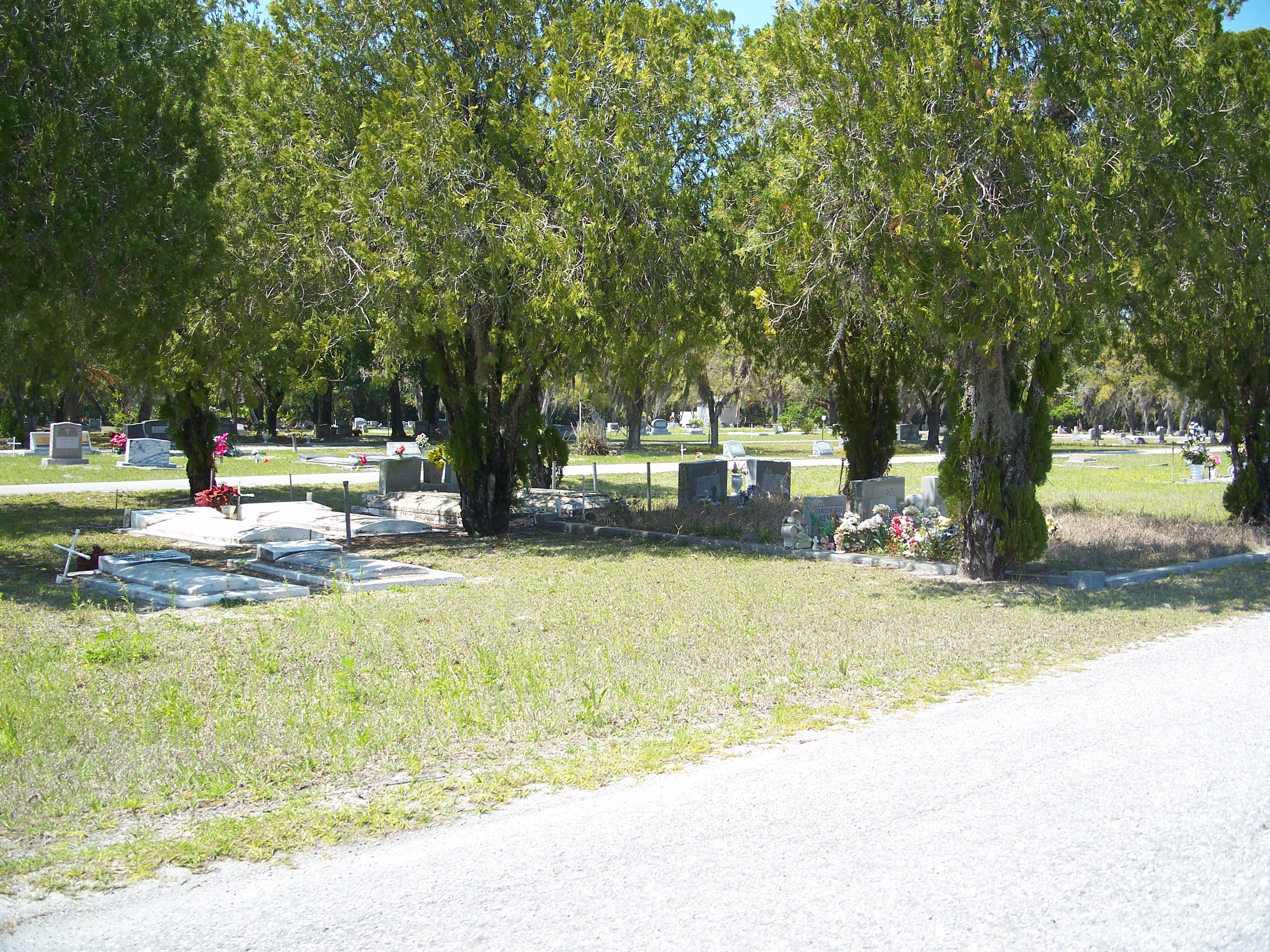
- Fort Denaud Cemetery

- Location within Florida Location within the United States
- Coordinates: 26°44′52″N 81°30′36″W
- Country: United States
- State: Florida
- County: Hendry

Area
  - Total: 20.76 sq mi (53.78 km^{2})
  - Land: 20.05 sq mi (51.94 km^{2})
  - Water: 0.71 sq mi (1.84 km^{2})
- Elevation: 10 ft (3.0 m)

Population (2020)
  - Total: 2,049
  - Density: 102.2/sq mi (39.45/km^{2})
- Time zone: UTC−5 (Eastern (EST))
  - Summer (DST): UTC−4 (EDT)
- ZIP code: 33935
- Area code: 863
- FIPS code: 12-23730
- GNIS feature ID: 2583343

Fort Denaud is a census-designated place (CDP) and former fort in Hendry County, Florida, United States. As of the 2020 census, the population of the CDP was 2,049, up from 1,694 at the 2010 census. It is part of the LaBelle, Florida Micropolitan Statistical Area.

== History ==
The fort was situated next to the Caloosahatchee River, 27 miles (43 km) east of Fort Myers. The fort was first established in 1837 as a supply depot during the Second Seminole War. It was named in honor of Pierre Denaud, a French-Canadian trapper who had owned the land and had traded skins and hides with the Seminole prior to the Seminole War. The fort was reoccupied and was more tactically significant during the Third Seminole War, where it served as a headquarters for several companies of federal troops and as a middle point on the Caloosahatchee river between Fort Myers and Lake Okeechobee. In December 1854, Brevet Major William Hays took command of three companies from the 2nd Artillery Regiment serving in the area. In January 1855, he moved most of his men to Fort Denaud and established it as his operational base and headquarters. From there, patrols were sent out into Big Cypress Swamp to map out Indian villages as well as along Fisheating Creek. A sketch from 1855 shows that Fort Denaud was connected to a fort opposite the Caloosahatchee called Fort T.B. Adams by a boat bridge. On January 18, 1856, a small army detachment was attacked on the river near Denaud and all but one of the soldiers were killed.

In 1963, the swing-style Fort Denaud Bridge was built across the Caloosahatchee. The bridge and its current approach stands were put into place at mile 108.2 along Route 78A. On the north side of the river is Fort Denaud Cemetery. On the south side of the Fort Denaud Bridge is a historic marker.

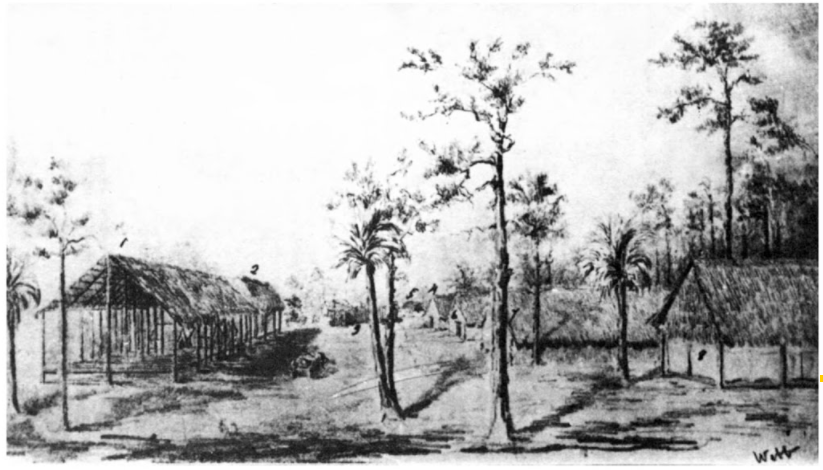
Fort Denaud, sketched by Alexander Webb in early 1856

Text of Fort Denaud historic marker: —

The combined pressure of growing white settlement in Florida and federal policy of relocating Indian tribes west of the Mississippi sparked the outbreak of the 2nd Seminole War in 1835. Controlling the coasts and campaigning in the heart of Seminole lands were the objectives of Major General Thomas Jesup in 1837. Captain B. L. E. Bonneville established Fort Denaud in 1838 as one of a series of posts linking American operations south of Tampa to the east coast. It was constructed on the south bank of the Caloosahatchee River 27 miles from Fort Myers on land owned by Pierre Denaud, a French Indian trader. The fort consisted of tents with a blockhouse in their midst. It served as a supply depot for troops in the Lake Okeechobee area and was utilized intermittently until the war ended in 1842. Fort Denaud was reopened in 1855, soon after the outbreak of the 3rd Seminole War. Additions included company quarters, hospital guardhouse, sutler's store and stables. A few months after a fire ravaged the post in June 1856, another site on the north bank of the river two miles west was chosen. The fort, which was abandoned in May 1858, gave its name to the nearby town of Ft. Denaud.

== Geography ==
The Fort Denaud CDP occupies the northwest corner of Hendry County. It is bounded to the north by Glades County, to the southeast by the city of LaBelle, and to the west by Lee County. Florida State Road 80 forms the southern edge of the CDP; SR 80 leads east 2 miles (3 km) into LaBelle and 34 miles (55 km) to Clewiston, and west 27 miles (43 km) to Fort Myers.

According to the U.S. Census Bureau, the CDP has a total area of 20.8 square miles (54.0 km^{2}), of which 20.2 square miles (52.2 km^{2}) are land and 0.69 square miles (1.8 km^{2}), or 3.40%, are water. The Caloosahatchee River flows through the center of the CDP, running west to tidewater at Fort Myers.

== Demographics ==
Historical population
Census	Pop.	Note	%±
2010	1,694		—
2020	2,049		21.0%
U.S. Decennial Census

Fort Denaud first appeared as a census designated place in the 2010 U.S. census.

=== 2020 census ===
As of the 2020 census, Fort Denaud had a population of 2,049. The median age was 51.0 years. 18.2% of residents were under the age of 18 and 30.2% of residents were 65 years of age or older. For every 100 females there were 105.7 males, and for every 100 females age 18 and over there were 102.3 males age 18 and over.

9.1% of residents lived in urban areas, while 90.9% lived in rural areas.

There were 814 households in Fort Denaud, of which 28.7% had children under the age of 18 living in them. Of all households, 63.6% were married-couple households, 12.3% were households with a male householder and no spouse or partner present, and 17.6% were households with a female householder and no spouse or partner present. About 16.9% of all households were made up of individuals and 11.0% had someone living alone who was 65 years of age or older.

There were 1,252 housing units, of which 35.0% were vacant. The homeowner vacancy rate was 1.0% and the rental vacancy rate was 3.9%.

Racial composition as of the 2020 census
Race	Number	Percent
White	1,724	84.1%
Black or African American	22	1.1%
American Indian and Alaska Native	10	0.5%
Asian	6	0.3%
Native Hawaiian and Other Pacific Islander	0	0.0%
Some other race	116	5.7%
Two or more races	171	8.3%
Hispanic or Latino (of any race)	356	17.4%

== Fictional references ==
A scene from Just Cause, a 1995 suspense crime thriller film directed by Arne Glimcher and starring Sean Connery and Laurence Fishburne, was filmed in Fort Denaud.
