= Billy's Creek =

River in Florida, United States

Coordinates: 26.65174°N 81.85675°W

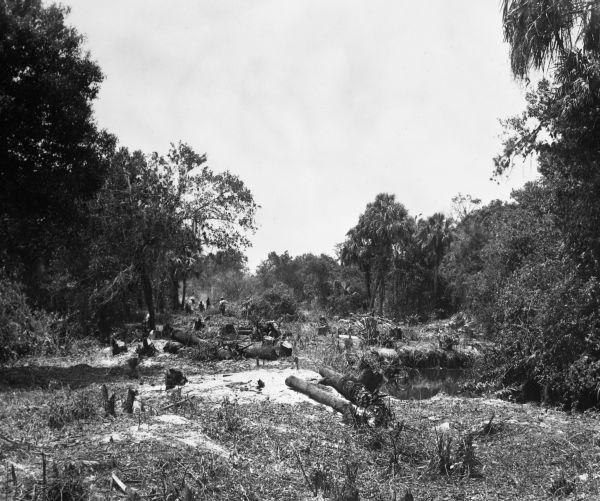
Image taken of drainage work being done on April 27, 1935.

Billy's Creek is a creek in Fort Myers, Florida. It is a tributary of the Caloosahatchee River and contains mangrove vegetation. The creek was named after the Seminole chief Billy Bowlegs who was forced to surrender there by United States forces in 1858. Billy's Creek has its beginnings as meandering water from a canal and is unique in that it is a scenic urban waterway and part of the Calusa Blueway. Joint efforts to improve water quality from various government agencies allowed the construction of the Billy's Creek Filter Marsh and adjacent nature park. This waterway is maintained by the Friends of Billy's Creek, a volunteer group in Lee County.
