= North Fort Myers, Florida =

- Census-designated place
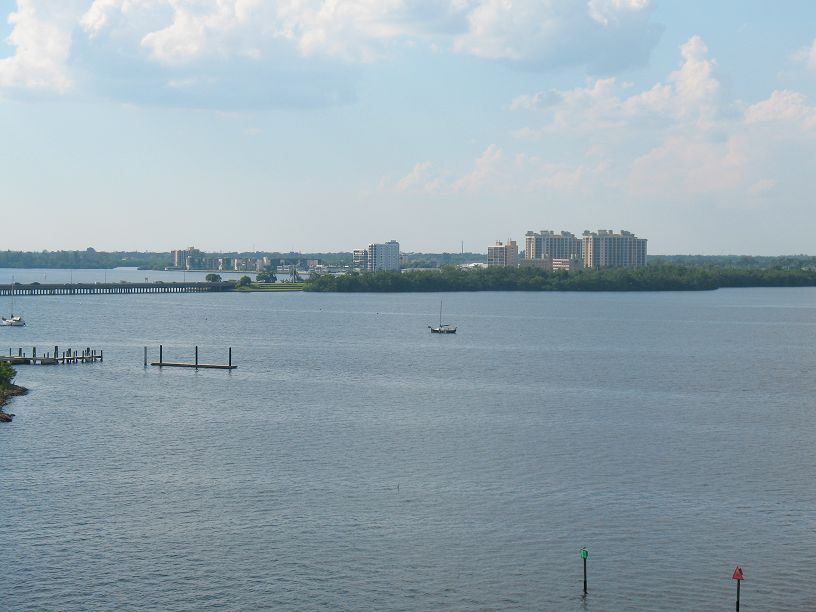
- View of North Fort Myers, Florida

- Location in Lee County and the state of Florida
- Coordinates: 26°43′50″N 81°51′30″W
- Country: United States
- State: Florida
- County: Lee

Area
  - Total: 53.13 sq mi (137.61 km^{2})
  - Land: 49.37 sq mi (127.86 km^{2})
  - Water: 3.76 sq mi (9.75 km^{2})
- Elevation: 16 ft (4.9 m)

Population (2020)
  - Total: 42,719
  - Density: 865.4/sq mi (334.12/km^{2})
- Time zone: UTC-5 (Eastern (EST))
  - Summer (DST): UTC-4 (EDT)
- ZIP codes: 33903, 33917, 33918
- Area code: 239
- FIPS code: 12-49350
- GNIS feature ID: 2403350

North Fort Myers is an unincorporated area and census-designated place (CDP) in Lee County, Florida, United States. The population was 42,719 at the 2020 census, up from 39,407 at the 2010 census. It is part of the Cape Coral-Fort Myers, Florida Metropolitan Statistical Area.

== Geography ==
North Fort Myers is located in northern Lee County northwest across the Caloosahatchee River from Fort Myers proper. It is bordered to the west by the city of Cape Coral and to the north by Charlotte County.

Interstate 75 runs through North Fort Myers, with access from Exit 143 (Florida State Road 78). I-75 leads northwest 67 miles (108 km) to the Sarasota area and south 38 miles (61 km) to the Naples area, while SR-78 leads east 34 miles (55 km) to LaBelle and west 16 miles (26 km) to Pine Island Center. U.S. Route 41 (North Tamiami Trail) passes through the center of North Fort Myers, leading southeast across the Caloosahatchee Bridge into the center of Fort Myers and northwest 24 miles (39 km) to Port Charlotte.

According to the United States Census Bureau, the North Fort Myers CDP has a total area of 54.4 square miles (140.9 km^{2}), of which 50.6 square miles (131.1 km^{2}) are land and 3.8 square miles (9.8 km^{2}), or 6.97%, are water.

== Demographics ==
Historical population
Census	Pop.	Note	%±
1970	8,798		—
1980	22,808		159.2%
1990	30,027		31.7%
2000	40,214		33.9%
2010	39,407		−2.0%
2020	42,719		8.4%

=== Racial and ethnic composition ===
North Fort Myers racial composition (Hispanics excluded from racial categories) (NH = Non-Hispanic)
Race	Pop 2010	Pop 2020	% 2010	% 2020
White (NH)	35,742	36,350	90.70%	85.09%
Black or African American (NH)	508	595	1.29%	1.39%
Native American or Alaska Native (NH)	108	68	0.27%	0.16%
Asian (NH)	254	292	0.64%	0.68%
Pacific Islander or Native Hawaiian (NH)	18	7	0.05%	0.02%
Some other race (NH)	18	128	0.05%	0.30%
Two or more races/Multiracial (NH)	321	1,136	0.81%	2.66%
Hispanic or Latino (any race)	2,438	4,143	6.19%	9.70%
Total	39,407	42,719	100.00%	100.00%

=== 2020 census ===
As of the 2020 census, North Fort Myers had a population of 42,719. The median age was 64.0 years. 9.6% of residents were under the age of 18 and 47.8% of residents were 65 years of age or older. For every 100 females there were 92.5 males, and for every 100 females age 18 and over there were 91.6 males age 18 and over.

90.1% of residents lived in urban areas, while 9.9% lived in rural areas.

There were 21,718 households in North Fort Myers, of which 10.6% had children under the age of 18 living in them. Of all households, 46.8% were married-couple households, 18.9% were households with a male householder and no spouse or partner present, and 27.5% were households with a female householder and no spouse or partner present. About 35.0% of all households were made up of individuals and 23.8% had someone living alone who was 65 years of age or older.

There were 28,395 housing units, of which 23.5% were vacant. The homeowner vacancy rate was 3.1% and the rental vacancy rate was 12.7%.

Racial composition as of the 2020 census
Race	Number	Percent
White	37,591	88.0%
Black or African American	682	1.6%
American Indian and Alaska Native	133	0.3%
Asian	304	0.7%
Native Hawaiian and Other Pacific Islander	7	0.0%
Some other race	1,093	2.6%
Two or more races	2,909	6.8%
Hispanic or Latino (of any race)	4,143	9.7%

=== 2010 census ===
As of the 2010 United States census, there were 39,407 people, 20,468 households, and 12,082 families residing in the CDP.

Of the 20,468 households in 2010, 12.2% had children under the age of 18 living with them, 49.1% were headed by married couples living together, 6.8% had a female householder with no husband present, and 40.8% were non-families. 33.9% of all households were made up of individuals, and 22.0% were someone living alone who was 65 years of age or older. The average household size was 1.98, and the average family size was 2.45.

In 2010, in the CDP, 10.8% of the population were under the age of 18, 4.1% were from 18 to 24, 12.3% were from 25 to 44, 29.3% were from 45 to 64, and 43.4% were 65 years of age or older. The median age was 61.8 years. For every 100 females, there were 93.4 males. For every 100 females age 18 and over, there were 91.6 males.

=== Income ===
For the period 2013–2017, the estimated median annual income for a household in the CDP was $39,876, and the median income for a family was $53,893. Male full-time workers had a median income of $41,079 versus $34,207 for females. The per capita income for the CDP was $26,891. About 9.0% of families and 13.8% of the population were below the poverty line, including 20.8% of those under age 18 and 8.3% of those age 65 or over.

== Notable people ==
- Thomas Bohanon, NFL player
- Noel Devine, Canadian Football League player
- Mike Greenwell, MLB player and NASCAR Craftsman Truck Series driver
- Jeff Kottkamp, Florida lieutenant governor
- Mindy McCready, country music singer
- Deion Sanders, NFL player
