= Florida Heartland =

Region in Florida

Coordinates: 27.1941°N 81.3702°W

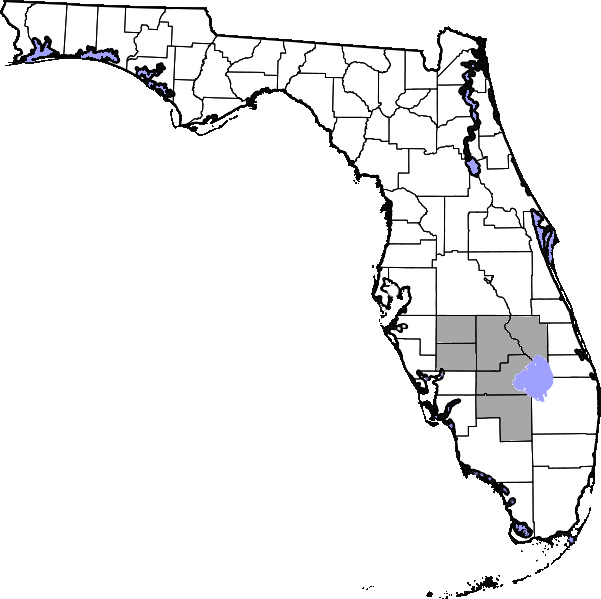
Map of the Florida Heartland

The Florida Heartland (also known as South Central Florida) is a region of Florida located to the north and west of Lake Okeechobee, composed of six inland, predominantly rural counties—DeSoto, Glades, Hardee, Hendry, Highlands, and Okeechobee. In 2020, The US Census Bureau recorded the population of the Florida Heartland region at 251,927. The most populous county in the region is Highlands County (2022 population of 105,618). Highlands County also contains the region's two largest cities: Avon Park (2022 population of 10,046) and Sebring (2022 population of 11,379).

Unlike the more urbanized coastal areas to the east and west, the Florida Heartland is more culturally akin to the Florida panhandle and the Deep South in general than the rest of South Florida. While located in Palm Beach County, the nearby rural cities of South Bay, Belle Glade and Pahokee as well as the census-designated place of Lake Harbor, located on the southeastern shore of Lake Okeechobee, are more associated with the Florida Heartland than the remainder of South Florida. The same could also apply to the Collier County communities of Immokalee, Ave Maria and Harker as well as to the Martin County community of Port Mayaca. Occasionally included are the southern Polk County communities of Fort Meade, Frostproof and River Ranch as well as Yeehaw Junction in Osceola County.

== Economy and resources ==
The region is primarily rural in nature, with the primary economic driver being agriculture. Important products grown in this area include tomatoes, beef, sugarcane, cucumbers and citrus products including oranges.

In Hardee County, phosphate mining is also a substantial industry, particularly along the Peace River basin.

== Demographics ==
As of the 2020 United States Census, there were 251,927 people living in the Florida Heartland region.

The racial makeup of the region was: 65.6% White (150,302) 22.2% Hispanic (50,817) 9.8% Black (22,510) 1.2% Other/Pacific Islander (2,687) 0.7% Asian (1,701) 0.5% Native American (1,192)

== Government ==
Like much of Florida, each county in the region has its own government. Within each county, there are also incorporated cities and towns.

== Education ==
Each of the six counties has its own school board, with four of the county school systems consisting of one high school, one alternative school and no more than two middle schools. Highlands County has three high schools while Hendry County has two.

The six school districts are all members of the Heartland Educational Consortium, located in Lake Placid, Florida. The Consortium is one of three educational consortia in the state, created by state legislature to provide support to small and rural school districts.

South Florida State College, the largest post-secondary institution based within Florida's Heartland, is located in Avon Park and has campuses in Lake Placid, Bowling Green and Arcadia.

Other community colleges that have campuses in the Florida Heartland include the Indian River State College's Dixon Hendry Campus in Okeechobee, and the Fort Myers-based Florida SouthWestern State College with its Hendry/Glades Center in LaBelle.

== Regional transportation ==
=== Highways ===
There are no exits from Interstate highways in the Florida Heartland. The only Interstate highway to pass through the Florida Heartland is Interstate 75, which passes briefly through extreme southwestern DeSoto County near Port Charlotte, however, there are no exits in the county. The Florida's Turnpike passes through the northeastern corner of Okeechobee County, and includes the Fort Drum service plaza, however, there are no exits along that segment.

U.S. Route 27 and U.S. Route 17 are the only major four-lane highways within the Florida Heartland region. U.S. 27 runs from the southeastern corner of the region at the Hendry–Palm Beach county line just east of Clewiston to the northern boundary of the Heartland region at the Highlands–Polk county line. U.S. Route 17 runs from the DeSoto-Charlotte County line north to the Hardee–Polk county line.

Other four-lane highways within the Heartland region include Florida State Road 70, which runs from Okeechobee east to the Okeechobee–St. Lucie County line, and Florida State Road 80, which runs from Whidden Corner several miles west of Clewiston west to the Hendry–Lee County line.

U.S. Highways in the region:

- US 17
- US 27
- US 441
- US 98

State Roads in the region include:

- State Road 17
- State Road 29
- State Road 64
- State Road 66
- State Road 70
- State Road 710
- State Road 78
- State Road 80

=== Airports ===
There is no scheduled airline service in the Florida Heartland. The following General Aviation airports operate in the region:

- Arcadia Municipal Airport
- Avon Park Executive Airport
- Airglades Airport (Clewiston)
- LaBelle Municipal Airport
- Okeechobee County Airport
- Sebring Regional Airport
- Wauchula Municipal Airport

=== Railway ===
There are three freight lines operating in the Florida Heartland, with approximately 190 miles of track: CSX Transportation, Seminole Gulf Railway, and South Central Florida Express.

Amtrak service operates on CSX tracks, with stops in Sebring and Okeechobee.

== Tourism ==
Tourism is an economic driver in the area, but far less so than most of the rest of the state. The lack of development and amenities results in fewer tourists visiting the area, and there are no oceanfront beaches to attract nearby residents. The largest tourist attraction in the Florida Heartland is the Sebring International Raceway, southeast of Sebring in Highlands County. There, the 12 Hours of Sebring, an American Le Mans Series race usually held in the second week of March, drew a "paying crowd" of more than 169,000 in 2006. Many seasonal residents (sometimes referred to as "snowbirds") live in the area during the winter months only, as temperatures in south Florida stay very moderate during that time of year. Lake Okeechobee and Lake Istokpoga in Highlands County attract fishers to the area.

== Area codes ==
Area code 863 is used throughout the region.

== Regional media ==
=== Newspapers ===
There are two daily newspapers published in the Heartland, the Okeechobee News (Okeechobee), and Highlands Today (Sebring).

Other daily newspapers that serve the Heartland include:

- The Ledger (Lakeland)
- The News-Press (Fort Myers)
- Miami Herald (Miami)
- Orlando Sentinel (Orlando)
- The Palm Beach Post (West Palm Beach)
- Tampa Bay Times (St. Petersburg)
- Charlotte Sun (Port Charlotte)
- The DeSoto Sun Herald (Arcadia)

=== Radio stations ===
The following radio stations operate in the Heartland:

- WAFC Clewiston
- WJNX-FM Okeechobee
- WAPQ-LP Avon Park
- WAUC Wauchula
- WBIY LaBelle
- WAVP Avon Park
- WFLJ Frostproof
- WCXS Arcadia
- WITS Sebring
- WQJS Clewiston
- WJCM Sebring
- WJFH Sebring
- WOKC Okeechobee
- WWLL Sebring
- WWOJ Avon Park
- WWRZ Fort Meade
- WWTK Avon Park
- WWWP-LP Arcadia (off air)
- WZSP Nocatee
- WSRQ-FM Zolfo Springs

WRMI, a Miami-based shortwave radio station, broadcasts from facilities near Okeechobee. The Okeechobee site was previously the longtime home of Family Radio's WYFR from 1977 to 2013.

== Florida Heartland population data ==
=== Counties ===
County	County Seat	Pop. (2020)	Pop. (2010)	Pop. (2000)	Change (2020–2010)	Change (2000–2010)	Change (1990–2000)
DeSoto County	Arcadia	33,976	34,862	32,209	-2.5%	+8.2%	+35.0%
Glades County	Moore Haven	12,126	12,884	10,576	-5.9%	+21.8%	+39.3%
Hardee County	Wauchula	25,327	27,731	26,938	-8.7%	+2.9%	+38.2%
Hendry County	LaBelle	39,619	39,140	36,120	+1.2%	+8.1%	+40.5%
Highlands County	Sebring	101,235	98,786	87,366	+2.5%	+13.1%	+27.7%
Okeechobee County	Okeechobee	39,644	39,996	35,910	-0.9%	+11.4%	+21.2%
Total		251,927	253,399	229,209	-0.6%	+11.0%	+31.1%
Florida - statewide		21,538,187	18,801,310	15,982,378	+14.6%	+17.6%	+23.5%

=== Incorporated municipalities ===
- Arcadia, DeSoto County
- Avon Park, Highlands County
- Bowling Green, Hardee County
- Clewiston, Hendry County
- LaBelle, Hendry County
- Lake Placid, Highlands County
- Moore Haven, Glades County
- Okeechobee, Okeechobee County
- Sebring, Highlands County
- Wauchula, Hardee County
- Zolfo Springs, Hardee County

=== Metropolitan and micropolitan areas ===
The Sebring, Florida, Metropolitan Statistical Area, which includes all of Highlands County, is the only MSA within the Florida Heartland region. With a 2023 estimated population of 107,614 the Sebring MSA has the smallest population of Florida's 22 Metropolitan Statistical Areas.

Additionally, the Census Bureau has identified four Micropolitan Statistical Areas:

- Arcadia, Fla. Micropolitan Statistical Area (DeSoto County, Florida)
- Clewiston, Fla. Micropolitan Statistical Area (Hendry County, Florida)
- Okeechobee, Fla. Micropolitan Statistical Area (Okeechobee County, Florida)
- Wauchula, Fla. Micropolitan Statistical Area (Hardee County, Florida)
