= National Fire =

2026 Wildfire in Collier County, Florida

- Part of the 2026 Florida wildfires
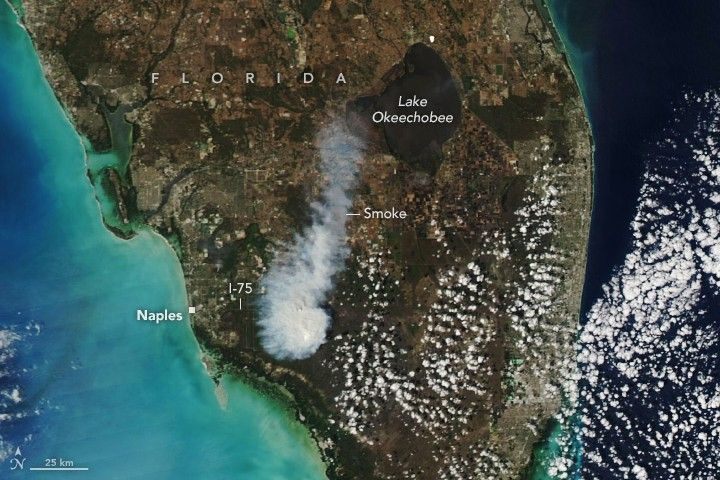
- National Fire seen from space on February 25
- Date: February 22, 2026 – March 17, 2026 (23 days)
- Location: Big Cypress National Preserve; (Collier County, Florida)
- Coordinates: 26°12′47″N 81°32′30″W

Statistics
- Status: Extinguished
- Burned area: 35,027 acres (14,175 ha)

Impacts
- Evacuated: Jerome; (Voluntary Evacuation)
- Cost: >$4.5 million in fire suppression efforts alone

Ignition
- Cause: Human; under investigation

Map
- Location of National Fire in Florida, United States

The National Fire was a major wildfire that burned in Big Cypress National Preserve. The fire began on February 22, 2026. During the night from February 25 to 26, dense smoke from the fire led to the temporary closure of Alligator Alley. As of March 7, the fire had burned an estimated 35,027 acres (14,175 ha) and was 67% contained. The fire was fully contained on March 17. The total estimated cost of fire suppression efforts to date exceeds $4.5 million (2026 USD). The cause of the fire has been identified as “human caused”.

== Background ==
=== Drought ===
During the winter of 2025–2026, a record-breaking drought struck the Florida Peninsula, leading to level 3 "extreme" drought covering more than two-thirds of the state. Combined with a hard freeze in the beginning of February, abundant dead vegetation fuel was present throughout the state.

These conditions, combined with winds 15–25 mph (24–40 km/h) and humidity as low as 30% caused critical fire conditions across the region.

== Progression ==
The fire first ignited at 23:34 local time on February 22 and was initially named the Mile Marker 80 fire. The fire slowly grew throughout the day on February 23, being named the National Fire and growing to 350 acres in size. By later that afternoon, it was reported that the fire had grown to 5,000+ acres in size and was being fought with aircraft. A portion of the Big Cypress National Preserve was then closed due to these conditions. Dense smoke from the fire later that day caused poor visibility on the 18-mile bend stretch of US-1.

By February 24, the fire had grown to 15,000 acres in size and remained 0% contained, further growing to 24,000 acres burned by February 25. Following a wind shift to the north later that day, dense smoke began to cover Alligator Alley.

=== Closure of Alligator Alley ===
On the evening of February 25, winds shifted from the south, causing heavy smoke to cover the Alligator Alley portion of I-75. At 9 P.M. (EST), a 57-mile stretch of the highway from exits 23 to 80 was shut down due to poor visibility, causing significant impacts to travelers. The interstate was reopened the following morning at 6 A.M. (EST).

The smoke plume from the National Fire continued past Alligator Alley, spreading across the Florida Heartland region and into as far as the Treasure Coast on the morning of February 26.

With the incoming arrival of a front to the state, which would bring much needed rain, firefighters took advantage of the favorable weather conditions and began defensive firing operations. As a result, the community of Jerome was evacuated, and FL-29 from I-75 to US-41 was closed on February 28 from 8 A.M. (EST) to 8 P.M. (EST). Residents of Copeland were also advised of possible evacuation.

The following day, after successful containment efforts on the National Fire, containment increased to 27%. By March 3, the fire had grown to 35,334 acres and was 53% contained following further successes in the containment efforts.

The National Fire then had no further growth thereafter, even decreasing in size to 35,027 acres, and was 67% contained by March 7.

Following rainfall and improving drought in the state, fire activity significantly decreased and the fire was fully contained by March 17.

== See also ==
- Mile Marker 39 Fire
- 2025 Florida wildfires
- Florida Firestorm
