= Haines City Branch =

Atlantic Coast Line Railroad branch in Florida

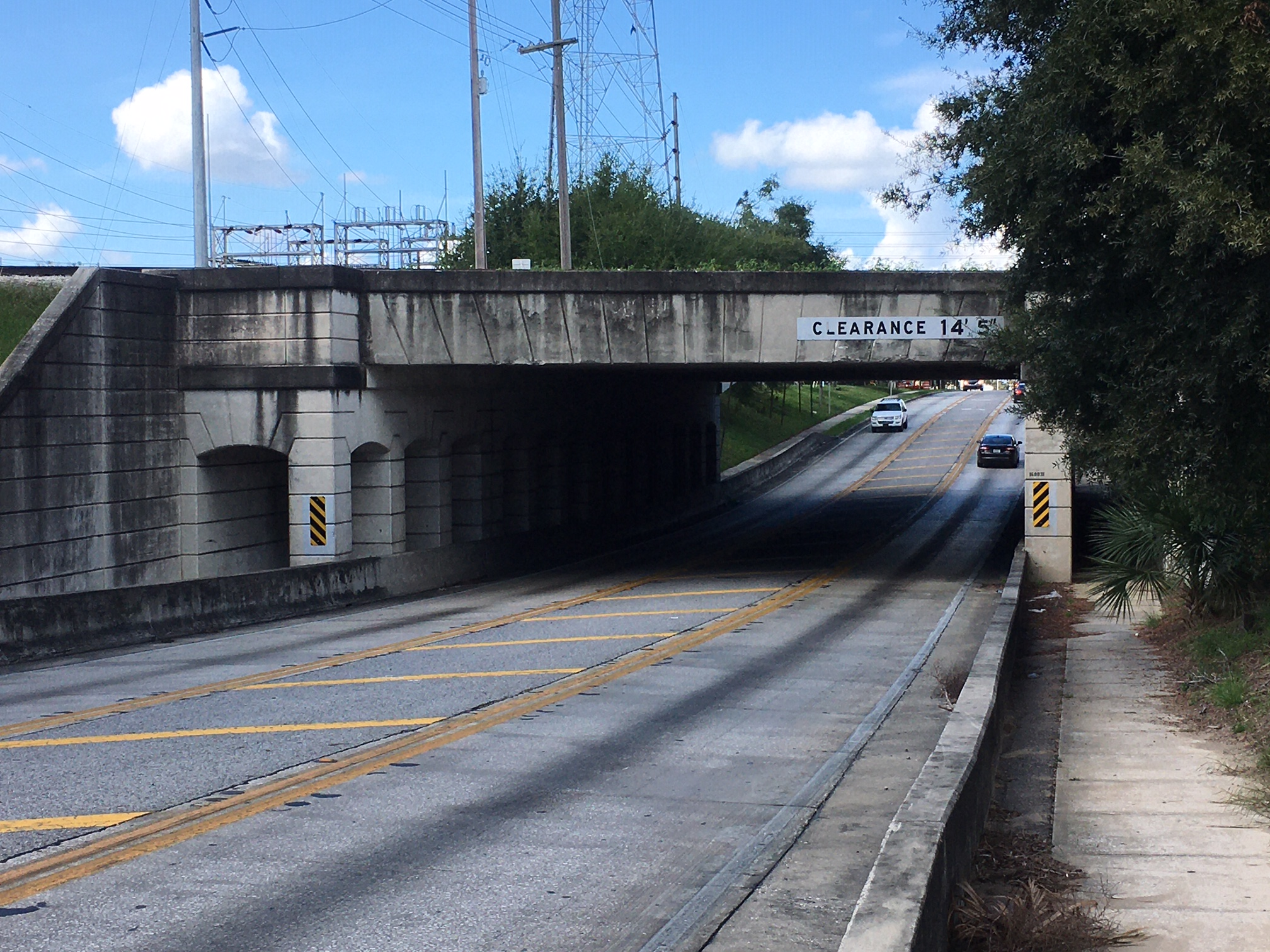
- US 17/92 passing under what remains of the Haines City Branch in Haines City. The structure once held multiple tracks but today only carries the one remaining track and a multi-use path.

Overview
- Status: Some segments are still operating
- Owner: Atlantic Coast Line Railroad
- Locale: Central Florida

Technical
- Line length: 167.9 mi (270.2 km)
- Track gauge: 1,435 mm (4 ft 8 1/2 in) standard gauge
- Electrification: No
- Signalling: None

The Atlantic Coast Line Railroad's Haines City Branch was a railroad line running from their main line in Haines City, Florida south through southern Central Florida. Track would stretch as far south as Everglades City upon its completion in 1928, which would be the southernmost point the entire Atlantic Coast Line Railroad system would ever reach. The Haines City Branch was one of the Atlantic Coast Line's major additions to its Florida network, much of which was previously part of the Plant System.

== Route description ==
The Haines City Branch began at a junction with the Atlantic Coast Line Railroad's main line in Haines City. It then headed south running through southern Central Florida, passing through Lake Wales, Avon Park, Sebring, Lake Placid, and Palmdale. Just south of Palmdale at Harrisburg, the line split with one route running southeast to Moore Haven, Clewiston, and Lake Harbor on Lake Okeechobee. The other route ran south from Harrisburg to Immokalee, Sunniland, and Everglades City at its greatest extent.

== History ==
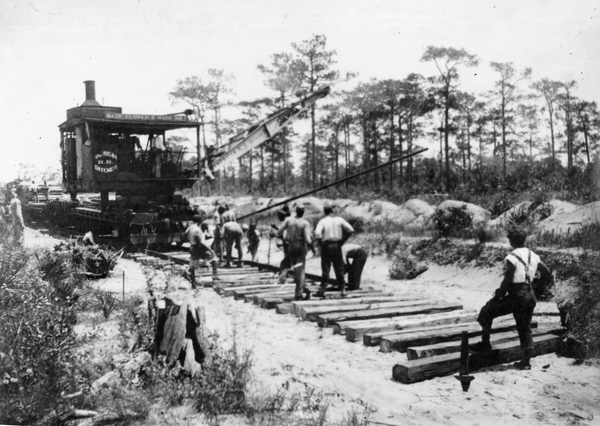
Track under construction in Sebring

=== Construction and early years ===
The Atlantic Coast Line Railroad began construction on the Haines City Branch in 1910, with its initial route running from the main line in Haines City south 47 miles to Sebring. This segment would be complete in June 1912 and served many vegetable and citrus growers.

In 1916, the Atlantic Coast Line made plans to extend the branch further south to Immokalee. Construction began that year with track reaching the Caloosahatchee River at Ortona by April 1918. This project also included a branch from Harrisburg (just south of Palmdale) to Moore Haven which was completed around the same time. The junction at Harrisburg was named after the Harris track-laying machine used to construct the line.

In 1919, construction resumed from Ortona and track was built south across the Caloosahatchee River through Goodno, Sears, and Felda to Immokalee. The first train to Immokalee arrived on October 16, 1921.

Shortly after service to Immokalee began, the Atlantic Coast Line's President Henry Walters authorized one last extension of the line south to Everglades City. The Atlantic Coast Line accomplished this extension by purchasing the Deep Lake Railroad from entrepreneur Barron Collier, the namesake of Collier County. The Deep Lake Railroad was originally built in 1913 by Walter Langford and John Roach, who operated a grapefruit grove near Deep Lake. The line was used to transport grapefruit south to Everglades City to be sold and shipped. In 1921, Collier purchased the line and grapefruit groves and also used the line to transport pine and cypress logs to a sawmill he operated in Everglades City. After the Atlantic Coast Line acquired the Deep Lake Railroad, they rebuilt it to their standards and extended track south from Immokalee to Deep Lake. The line was completed in 1928 and a passenger depot was built in Everglades City (known then as simply Everglades), which would be the farthest south the Atlantic Coast Line would ever reach.

In Moore Haven, the Atlantic Coast Line Railroad chartered the Moore Haven & Clewiston Railway to extend the Moore Haven Branch southeast a short distance to Clewiston, which would be complete in 1921. The Southern Sugar Corporation (which became the U.S. Sugar Corporation in 1931) would be a major customer on the line in Clewiston and they would also build private branch tracks from the line to their sugar fields. The Atlantic Coast Line acquired the Moore Haven and Clewiston Railway in 1925. In 1929, it was extended from Clewiston to the Miami Canal in Lake Harbor to connect with the Florida East Coast Railway's Kissimmee Valley Line. Track to Clewiston and Lake Harbor would end up being the busier route south of Harrisburg due to the Southern Sugar Company's operation. This led to track from Harrisburg to Lake Harbor to became the main route of the Haines City Branch with track to Everglades City becoming the Immokalee Branch on employee timetables.

=== Height of operation ===
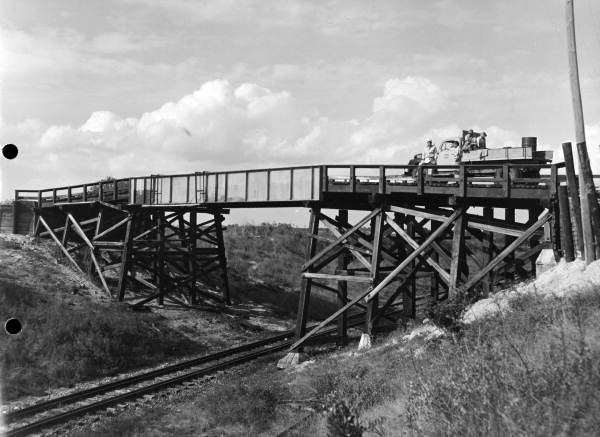
Haines City Branch passing through Lake Placid

In 1925, the Atlantic Coast Line would lose its monopoly in communities on the northern half of the Haines City Branch when the Atlantic Coast Line's competitor, the Seaboard Air Line Railroad, built their Miami Subdivision through Auburndale, West Lake Wales, Avon Park, and Sebring. The Seaboard line paralleled the Haines City Branch to the west through much of southern Central Florida, and the lines crossed each other just south of Avon Park.

By 1949, the line was relatively busy with the Atlantic Coast Line running a daily local passenger train from Haines City to Clewiston. A daily local freight train also ran from Haines City to Lake Harbor, and two additional freight trains ran six days a week from Haines City to Sebring. In addition, a mixed train (both passengers and freight) ran six days a week from Palmdale to Immokalee and Everglades City. In 1958, service to Everglades City was discontinued due to diminished traffic and track was removed between there and Copeland. By 1961, track was removed between Copeland and Sunniland.

In 1951, the Atlantic Coast Line built a branch from Keela (just east of Clewiston) south and east to Okeelanta to serve the Okeelanta sugar mill. The Okeelanta Branch was extended further east to the A. Duda and Sons Packing Co. in the 1960s (though this extension has since been abandoned).

=== Mergers and consolidation ===
The Atlantic Coast Line and Seaboard Air Line Railroads would merge in 1967, with the merged company being named the Seaboard Coast Line Railroad. The Haines City Branch initially remained intact after the merger, which was then known as the Haines City Subdivision. Though by 1968, the Seaboard Coast Line would abandon parts of the line north of Sebring to consolidate the network with the parallel Miami Subdivision becoming the main route through this area. The Haines City Subdivision was truncated at Waverly and track was abandoned from Waverly to Lake Wales. Track was also abandoned from Frostproof to Sebring with the exception of a short segment in Avon Park which became a spur of the Miami Subdivision. Remaining track from Lake Wales to Frostproof was annexed to the Lake Wales Subdivision (an east–west line that was previously part of the Seaboard Air Line's Valrico Subdivision). Track south of Sebring to Lake Harbor then became the Sebring Subdivision while the Immokalee Branch became the Immokalee Subdivision.

In 1980, the Seaboard Coast Line's parent company merged with the Chessie System, creating the CSX Corporation. The CSX Corporation initially operated the Chessie and Seaboard Systems separately until 1986, when they were merged into CSX Transportation. By 1982, the company removed track from south of Haines City to Waverly, as well as track from Immokalee to Sunniland. The rest of the Immokalee Subdivision was abandoned in 1989.

== Current conditions ==
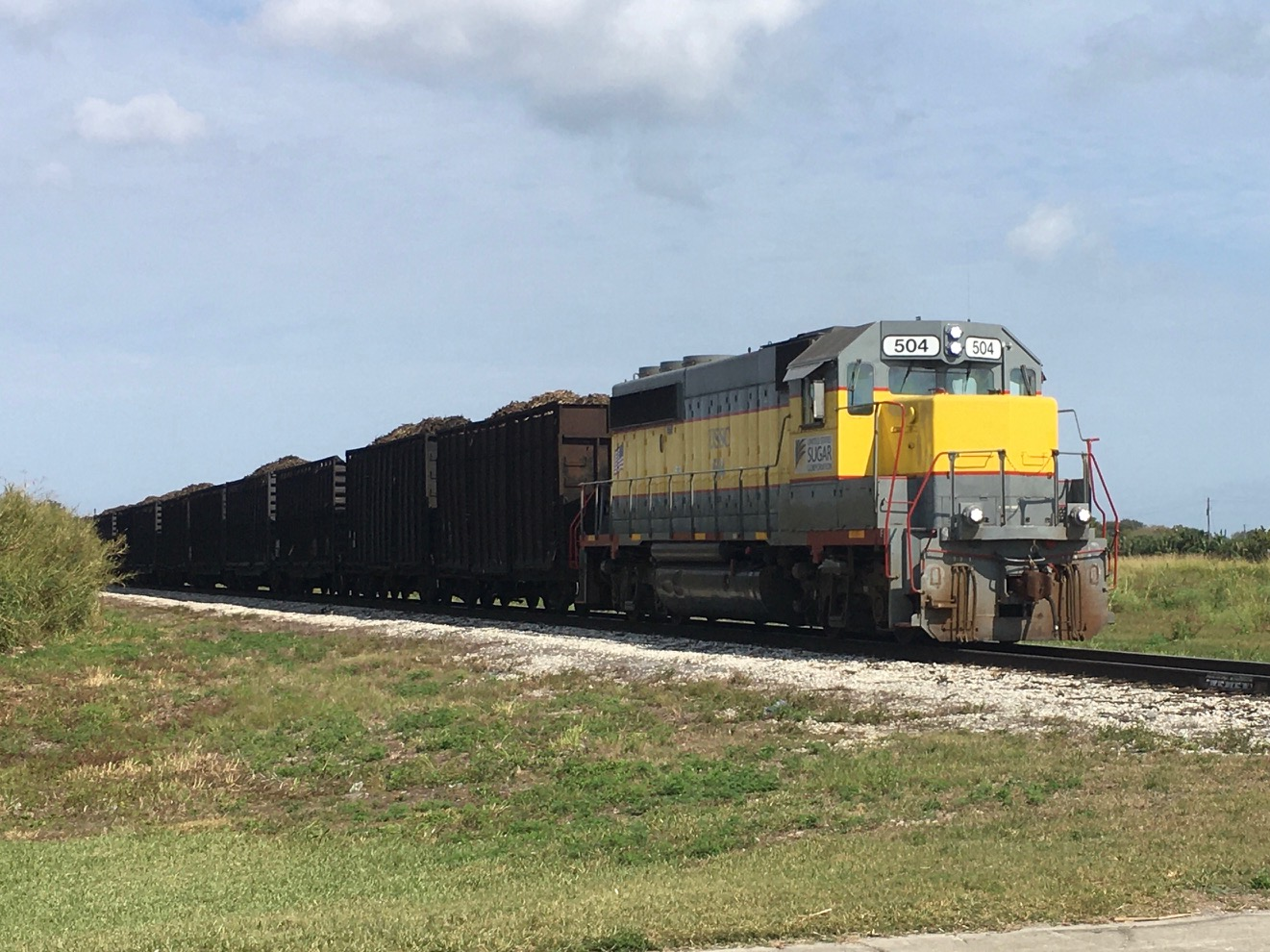
South Central Florida Express train approaching Clewiston on former line carrying harvested sugarcane

Despite parts of the Haines City Branch being abandoned, some segments remain in service. At the north end, the line remains within Haines City but is now serves as an industrial spur off of CSX's A Line (the former Atlantic Coast Line main line). The line remains grade separated through downtown Haines City, owing to how busy the line was in its earlier days.

From Lake Wales to Frostproof, the line is still in service and is now operated by the Florida Midland Railroad, a shortline that took over the line in 1987. This segment is now connected to the Auburndale Subdivision via a former Seaboard Air Line track from West Lake Wales to Lake Wales.

The short industrial spur in Avon Park is still in service that now branches off the Auburndale Subdivision (former Seaboard line). It begins south of the Avon Park Depot Museum and ends at a plastic irrigation manufacturing company.

The remaining track from Sebring to Clewiston and Lake Harbor also remains in service. U.S. Sugar, who has historically been a major customer on that part line for its entire history, bought it in 1994 and established its own shortline, the South Central Florida Express, Inc., who continues to operate it today.

State Road 29 continues to run very close to the former right of way between Immokalee and Everglades City.

== Historic stations ==
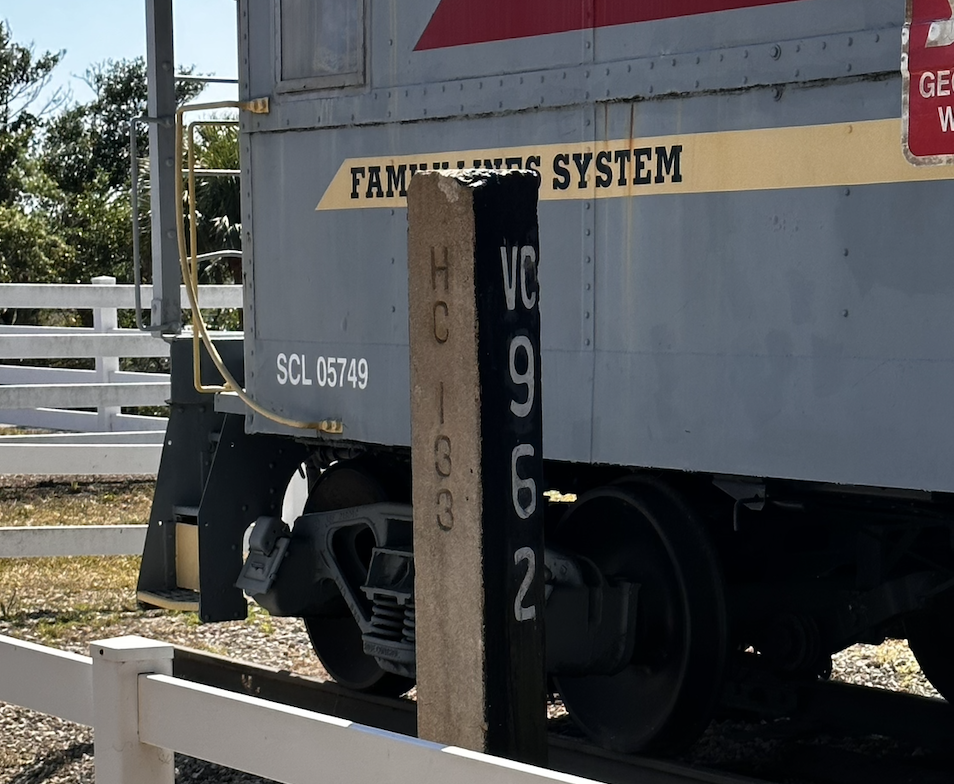
Milepost "VC 962" from the line near Harker (prefix became AVC after 1967 merger). The "HC 133" on the side denotes 133 miles from Haines City. Milepost is currently on display as part of the Train Village at Lakes Regional Park near Fort Myers.

Haines City to Everglades
Milepost	City/Location	Station	Image	Connections and notes
AVC 828.5	Haines City	Haines City		station located on the main line junction with Atlantic Coast Line Railroad Main Line
AVC 833.8	Lake Hamilton	Lake Hamilton		
AVC 835.7	Dundee	Dundee		
AVC 838.5	Waverly	Waverly		
AVC 840.1	Mountain Lake	Mountain Lake		
AVC 843.3	Lake Wales	Lake Wales		junction with Seaboard Air Line Railroad Valrico Subdivision
AVC 845.2	Highland Park	Highland Park		
AVC 849.8	Babson Park	Babson Park		
AVC 856.7	Frostproof	Frostproof		
AVC 861.3		Neilson		
AVC 863.4	Pittsburg	Pittsburg		
AVC 867.4	Avon Park	Avon Park		
AVC 869.0		Tulane		junction with Seaboard Air Line Railroad Miami Subdivision
AVC 875.5	Sebring	Sebring		
AVC 879.8		Desoto City		
AVC 884.6		Istokpoga		
AVC 892.0	Lake Placid	Lake Placid		
AVC 897.9		Childs		
AVC 902.7	Hicoria	Hicoria		
AVC 908.8	Venus	Venus		
AVC 918.6	Palmdale	Palmdale		
AVC 919.7		Harrisburg		junction with branch to Lake Harbor
AVC 923.4	Hall City	Hall City		
AVC 926.7	Ortona	Ortona		
AVC 929.5		Goodno		
AVC 939.3		Sears		
AVC 942.7		Keri		
AVC 947.6	Felda	Felda		
AVC 955.0	Immokalee	Immokalee		
AVC 957.9		Bunker Hill		
AVC 962.1	Harker	Harker		
AVC 967.9		Sunniland		
AVC 975.7	Miles City	Miles City		
AVC 983.3	Deep Lake	Deep Lake		
AVC 990.0	Copeland	Copeland		
AVC 992.4	Carnestown	Carnestown		
AVC 996.4	Everglades City	Everglades		

Harrisburg to Lake Harbor
Milepost	City/Location	Station	Image	Connections and notes
AVD 919.7		Harrisburg		junction with main route
AVD 929.5		Muckway		
AVD 933.8	Moore Haven	Moore Haven		
AVD 937.4		Gramlin		
AVD 937.8		Benbow		
AVD 941.5		Liberty Point		
AVD 943.0		Shawnee		
AVD 944.9		Sugarton		
AVD 947.9	Clewiston	Clewiston		
AVD 949.5		Sugar Junction		Wye to Clewiston Yard and U.S. Sugar mill
AVD 953.7		Keela		junction with Okeelanta Branch
AVD 957.7	Lake Harbor	Lake Harbor		junction with Florida East Coast Railway Lake Harbor Branch

Okeelanta Branch
Milepost	City/Location	Station	Connections and notes
AVF 953.7		Keela	junction with main route from Harrisburg to Lake Harbor
AVF 958.0		Vaughn	
AVF 970.0	Okeelanta	Okeelanta	
AVF 972.0		Cane	
AVF 977.0		Duda	
