= List of places in Florida: H =

This list of current cities, towns, unincorporated communities, counties, and other recognized places in the U.S. state of Florida also includes information on the number and names of counties in which the place lies, and its lower and upper zip code bounds, if applicable.

Name of place	Number of counties	Counties	Lower zip code	Upper zip code
Hacienda Village	1	Broward	33314	
Hague	1	Alachua	32601	
Haile	1	Alachua	32669	
Haile Plantation	1	Alachua		
Haines City	1	Polk	33844	
Hainesworth	1	Alachua		
Half Moon	1	Alachua	32669	
Halifax Estates	1	Volusia		
Hallandale	1	Broward	33009	
Hallandale Beach	1	Broward	33009	
Hall City	1	Glades		
Halsema	1	Duval		
Hamburg	1	Madison		
Hamilton	1	Broward	33062	
Hammock	1	Flagler		
Hammock Dunes	1	Flagler		
Hammocks	1	Miami-Dade		
Hammond	1	Putnam	32012	
Hammondville	1	Broward		
Hampton	1	Bradford	32044	
Hampton Beach	1	Bradford		
Hamptons at Boca Raton	1	Palm Beach		
Hampton Springs	1	Taylor	32347	
Hancock	1	Polk		
Hanson	1	Madison	32340	
Happy Valley	1	Escambia		
Harbeson City	1	Franklin		
Harbinwood Estates	1	Leon		
Harbor Beach	1	Broward		
Harbor Bluffs	1	Pinellas	33540	
Harbor East	1	Palm Beach	33432	
Harbor Heights	1	Broward		
Harbor Oaks	1	Volusia	32119	
Harbor Palms	1	Pinellas		
Harbor Point	1	Volusia	32023	
Harbor Shores	1	Lake		
Harbor View	1	Charlotte	33950	
Harbor View	1	Duval	32208	
Harbor Village	1	Broward		
Harbour Heights	1	Charlotte	33950	
Hardaway	1	Gadsden	32324	
Hardees	1	Brevard		
Hardeetown	1	Levy	32626	
Hardin Heights	1	Gadsden	32324	
Harker	1	Collier		
Harlem	1	Hendry	33440	
Harlem Heights	1	Lee		
Harlem Heights	1	Orange	32787	
Harmony	1	Osceola		
Harmony Heights	1	St. Lucie	33452	
Harney	1	Hillsborough		
Harold	1	Santa Rosa	32563	
Harp	1	Santa Rosa		
Harper	1	Santa Rosa		
Harrisburg	1	Glades	33944	
Harrison	1	Citrus		
Hart Haven	1	Duval	32205	
Hart Springs	1	Gilchrist		
Harvey Heights	1	Lee	33901	
Hasan	1	Alachua		
Hastings	1	St. Johns	32145	
Hatchbend	1	Lafayette	32008	
Hathaway Mill	1	Holmes		
Havana	1	Gadsden	32333	
Haven Beach	1	Pinellas	33535	
Haverhill	1	Palm Beach	33406	
Hawley Heights	1	Miami-Dade		
Hawthorne	1	Alachua	32640	
Hawthorne	1	Lake		
Haynes	1	Jackson		
Hays Place	1	Franklin		
Heathrow	1	Seminole	32746	
Hedges	1	Nassau	32097	
Heilbronn	1	Bradford		
Heilbron Springs	1	Bradford	32091	
Helen	1	Leon		
Hell Gate	1	Martin		
Henderson Creek	1	Collier		
Henderson Mill	1	Calhoun		
Hen Scratch	1	Highlands		
Hercules	1	Duval	32234	
Heritage Pines	1	Pasco		
Hermitage	1	Gadsden	32324	
Hernando	1	Citrus	34442	
Hernando Beach	1	Hernando	34607	
Herndon	1	Orange	32803	
Hero	1	Nassau	32097	
Hesperides	1	Polk	33853	
Hialeah	1	Miami-Dade	33010	17
Hialeah Estates	1	Miami-Dade		
Hialeah Gardens	1	Miami-Dade	33016	
Hialeah Lakes	1	Miami-Dade	33014	
Hibernia	1	Clay	32043	
Hibiscus Mobile Park	1	Lake	32757	
Hickory Hill	1	Holmes	32464	
Hicoria	1	Highlands		
Hidden River	1	Sarasota		
High Bluff	1	Franklin		
Highland	1	Clay	32058	
Highland Beach	1	Palm Beach	33487	
Highland City	1	Polk	33846	
Highland Court Manor	1	Alachua	32601	
Highland Lakes	1	Highlands	33825	
Highland Lakes	1	Miami-Dade		
Highland Meadows	1	Broward		
Highland Park	1	Pinellas	33540	
Highland Park	1	Polk	33853	
Highland Park	1	Seminole	32771	
Highlands	1	Broward	33064	
Highlands	1	Duval	32218	
Highlands City	1	Polk		
Highlands Park Estates	1	Highlands		
Highland View	1	Gulf	32456	
High Pines	1	Miami-Dade		
High Point	1	Brevard		
High Point	1	Hernando		
High Point	1	Palm Beach		
Highpoint	1	Pinellas		
High Ridge Estates	1	Broward		
High Springs	1	Alachua	32643	
Hiland Park	1	Bay	32405	
Hilden	1	St. Johns		
Hildreth	1	Suwannee	32008	
Hillburn Spring	1	Bradford		
Hillcoat	1	Hamilton		
Hillcrest Heights	1	Polk	33827	
Hilldale	1	Hillsborough	33614	
Hilliard	1	Nassau	32046	
Hilliardville	1	Wakulla	32301	
Hill 'n Dale	1	Hernando	33512	
Hillsboro	1	Hillsborough		
Hillsboro Beach	1	Broward	33062	
Hillsboro Pines	1	Broward		
Hillsboro Ranches	1	Broward		
Hilolo	1	Okeechobee		
Hines	1	Dixie		
Hinson	1	Gadsden	32333	
Hinsons Crossroads	1	Washington	32427	
Hiway Park	1	Highlands		
Hobbs Crossroads	1	Holmes		
Hobe Sound	1	Martin	33455	
Hodgson	1	Levy		
Hogan	1	Duval	32216	
Hogtown	1	Alachua		
Hog Valley	1	Marion		
Holden Heights	1	Orange	32805	
Holder	1	Citrus	34445	
Holiday	1	Pasco	34690	
Holiday Gardens	1	Pasco	33589	
Holiday Harbor	1	Duval	32216	
Holiday Heights	1	Monroe	33037	
Holiday Hills	1	Pasco	33552	
Holiday Manor	1	Polk	33844	
Holiday Plaza	1	Bay	32407	
Holland	1	Leon		
Holland Crossroads	1	Holmes	32425	
Holley	1	Santa Rosa	32561	
Hollingsworth Bluff	1	Columbia		
Hollister	1	Putnam	32147	
Holly Ford	1	Duval	32218	
Holly Hill	1	Volusia	32117	
Holly Point	1	Clay	32073	
Hollywood	1	Broward	33019	84
Hollywood Beach	1	Bay	32461	
Hollywood Beach Gardens	1	Broward		
Hollywood Hills	1	Broward	33021	
Hollywood Indian Reservation	1	Broward	33024	
Hollywood Ridge Farms	1	Broward		
Holmes Beach	1	Manatee	34218	
Holmes Valley	1	Washington		
Holopaw	1	Osceola	32901	
Holt	1	Okaloosa	32564	
Holts	1	Okaloosa		
Homeland	1	Polk	33847	
Homestead	1	Miami-Dade	33030	92
Homestead Air Force Base	1	Miami-Dade	33039	
Homestead Base	1	Miami-Dade		
Homestead Naval Security Group	1	Miami-Dade	33039	
Homestead Ridge	1	Leon		
Homine	1	Polk		
Homosassa	1	Citrus	34487	
Homosassa Springs	1	Citrus	34447	
Honeyville	1	Gulf	32465	
Honore	1	Sarasota		
Hooker Point	1	Hendry		
Hooker Point	1	Hillsborough		
Hooker's Prairie	1	Polk		
Hoover Mill	1	Holmes		
Hopewell	1	Hillsborough	33566	
Hopewell	1	Madison	32340	
Hopewell Gardens	1	Hillsborough		
Hopkins	1	Brevard	32901	
Horizon West	1	Orange		
Hornsville	1	Jackson	32460	
Horseshoe Beach	1	Dixie	32648	
Hosford	1	Liberty	32334	
Houston	1	Suwannee	32060	
Howard	1	Miami-Dade		
Howard Creek	1	Gulf		
Howey	1	Lake		
Howey Height	1	Lake		
Howey-in-the-Hills	1	Lake	34737	
Hoyt	1	Marion		
Huckleberry	1	Orange		
Hucomer	1	Volusia		
Hudson	1	Holmes		
Hudson	1	Pasco	34667	
Hudson-Bayonet Point	1	Pasco	33567	
Hudson Beach	1	Pasco		
Hugh	1	Clay	32265	
Hulaw	1	Holmes		
Hulaw	1	Washington		
Hull	1	DeSoto	33821	
Hunt	1	Seminole		
Hunt Club	1	Seminole	32703	
Hunter	1	Putnam		
Hunter's Creek	1	Orange		
Huntington	1	Marion		
Huntington	1	Putnam		
Hurlburt Field	1	Okaloosa	32544	
Hutchinson Island	2	Martin, St. Lucie	34957	
Hutchinson Island South	1	St. Lucie		
Hyde Grove	1	Duval	32222	
Hyde Park	1	Duval	32222	
Hyde Park	1	Hillsborough		
Hyde Park	1	Sarasota		
Hyde Park	1	Wakulla	32305	
Hydro	1	Alachua		
Hypoluxo	1	Palm Beach	33462	

== See also ==
- Florida
- List of municipalities in Florida
- List of former municipalities in Florida
- List of counties in Florida
- List of census-designated places in Florida
