= Huntington, Florida =

Huntington is the name of two places in the State of Florida:

- Huntington, Marion County, Florida
- Huntington, Putnam County, Florida
