= WAUC =

- Wauchula, Florida; United States
- Broadcast area: Sebring area
- Frequency: 1310 kHz
- Branding: Real Country 102.1 The Outlaw (translator frequency)

Programming
- Format: Real Country

Ownership
- Owner: Hardee Broadcasting LLC

History
- First air date: May 19, 1958
- Call sign meaning: City of license WAUChula

Technical information
- Licensing authority: FCC
- Facility ID: 40387
- Class: B
- Power: 5000 watts day 500 watts night
- Transmitter coordinates: 27°31′48.00″N 81°49′0.00″W
- Translator: (102.1 MHz) W271DH (Wauchula)

Links
- Public license information: Public file; LMS
- Webcast: TuneIn; Streema
- Website: 1021theoutlaw.com

WAUC (AM 1310 & FM 102.1) is a radio station broadcasting a Real Country format. Licensed to Wauchula, Florida, USA, the station serves the Florida Heartland, includes the Hardee, Desoto and Highlands County areas, along with radio listeners in nearby Polk County and online listeners worldwide.

On August 22, 2019, WAUC began simulcasting on FM translator W271DH on frequency 102.1.

== Programming ==
WAUC's 24-hour programming lineup blends country music from the 1970s to the 2010s, and features artists such as Blake Shelton, Brad Paisley, Merle Haggard, Willie Nelson, George Strait, Chris Stapleton, Garth Brooks, Alan Jackson, Travis Tritt, Kenny Rogers, Charley Pride, Jo Dee Messina, and more. The station also broadcasts several original live shows alongside syndicated programming.

The original logo of WAUC 1310 AM, before the slogan was introduced.

== Translators ==
Broadcast translator for WAUC (Main Programming)
Call sign	Frequency	City of license	FID	ERP (W)	HAAT	Class	FCC info
W271DH	102.1 FM	Wauchula, Florida	202801	250	135 m (443 ft)	D	LMS

== Promotions ==
Starting in 2017, the station helped to strengthen a campaign to revitalize the annual Pioneer Park days events that drew income to the local Hardee County and Heartland Florida areas. WAUC now remotely broadcasts from various community events throughout the Heartland.

== In popular culture ==
WAUC are the call letters used for the local television station depicted in the Academy Award-winning film Rocky. Real-life news anchor/reporter Diana Lewis interviews lead character Rocky Balboa in a refrigerated meat locker operated by the fictitious Shamrock Meats Inc.
