= Jerome, Florida =

- Unincorporated community
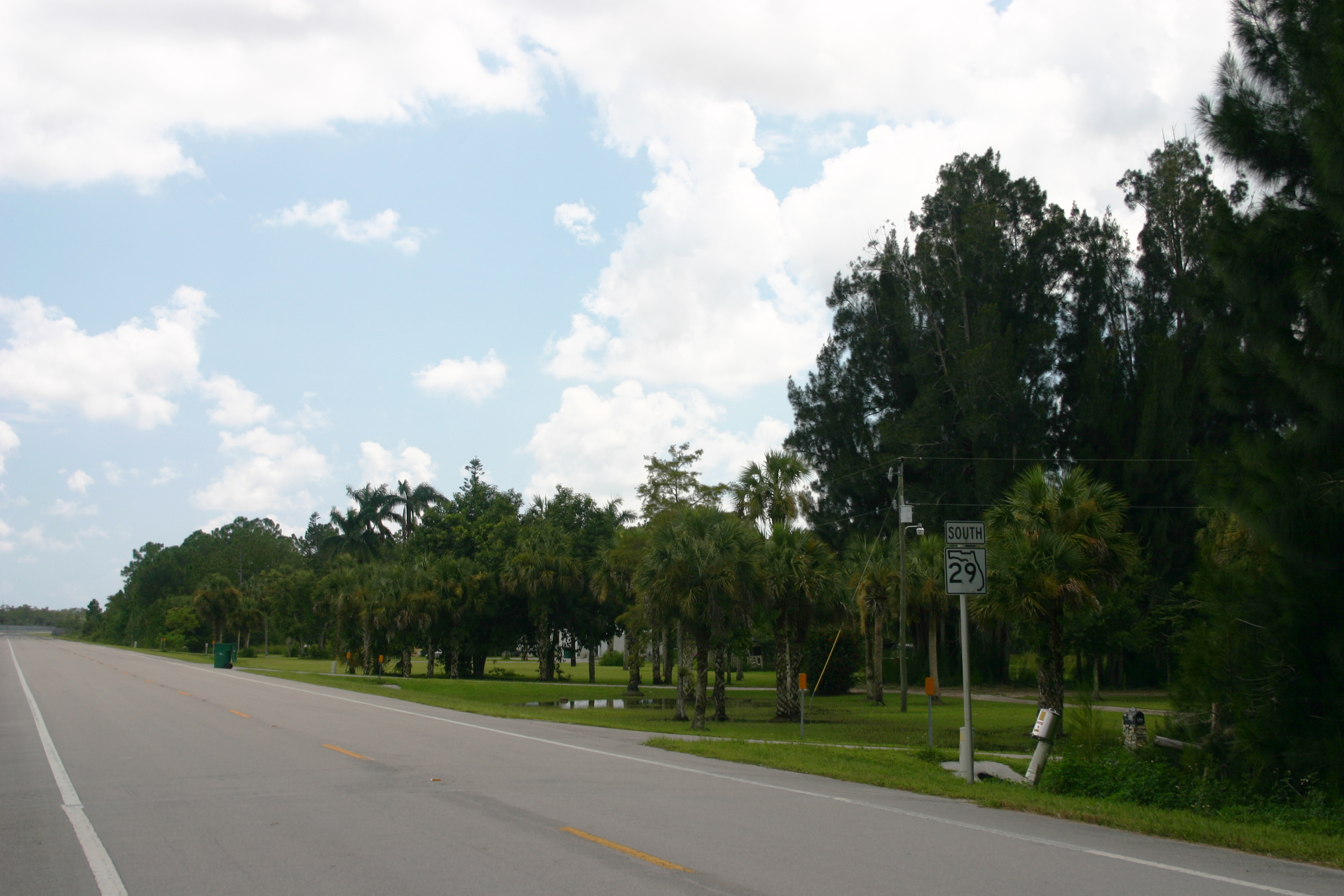
- Looking south along State Road 29

- Location within the state of Florida Jerome (the United States)
- Coordinates: 25°59′58″N 81°20′47″W
- Country: United States
- State: Florida
- County: Collier
- Elevation: 7 ft (2.1 m)
- Time zone: UTC-5 (Eastern (EST))
  - Summer (DST): UTC-4 (EDT)
- GNIS feature ID: 284765

Jerome is a small unincorporated community in Collier County, Florida, United States. It lies along State Road 29 north of Copeland and south of Deep Lake at an elevation of 10 feet (3 m). In the 1950s, Jerome housed the largest steam-powered lumber mill in the American South, until it burned down in 1956.

Jerome is part of the Naples–Marco Island Metropolitan Statistical Area. Creosote contamination has been a concern in the area.
