= WWLL =

Adult contemporary radio station in Sebring, Florida

- Sebring, Florida; United States
- Broadcast area: Sebring, Florida
- Frequency: 105.7 MHz
- Branding: 105.7 Lite FM

Programming
- Language: English
- Format: Adult contemporary
- Affiliations: Premiere Networks

Ownership
- Owner: Cohan Radio Group, Inc.
- Sister stations: WWTK; WWOJ; WJCM; WITS

History
- First air date: July 1967; 59 years ago (as WANZ at 105.5)
- Former call signs: WANZ (1967–1972); WSEB-FM (1972–1973); WSKP (1973–1984); WCAC (1984–1995); WYMR (1995–1998)
- Former frequencies: 105.5 MHz (1967–1997)

Technical information
- Licensing authority: FCC
- Facility ID: 57627
- Class: C3
- ERP: 19,000 watts
- HAAT: 107 meters (351 ft)
- Transmitter coordinates: 27°21′29″N 81°28′22″W

Links
- Public license information: Public file; LMS
- Webcast: Listen live
- Website: 1057litefm.com

WWLL (105.7 FM) is a radio station known as "105.7 Lite FM" which broadcasts from Sebring, in Highlands County, Florida. The station's format is adult contemporary.

Former logo
