= Lakes Regional Park =

Public park in Florida

Lakes Park
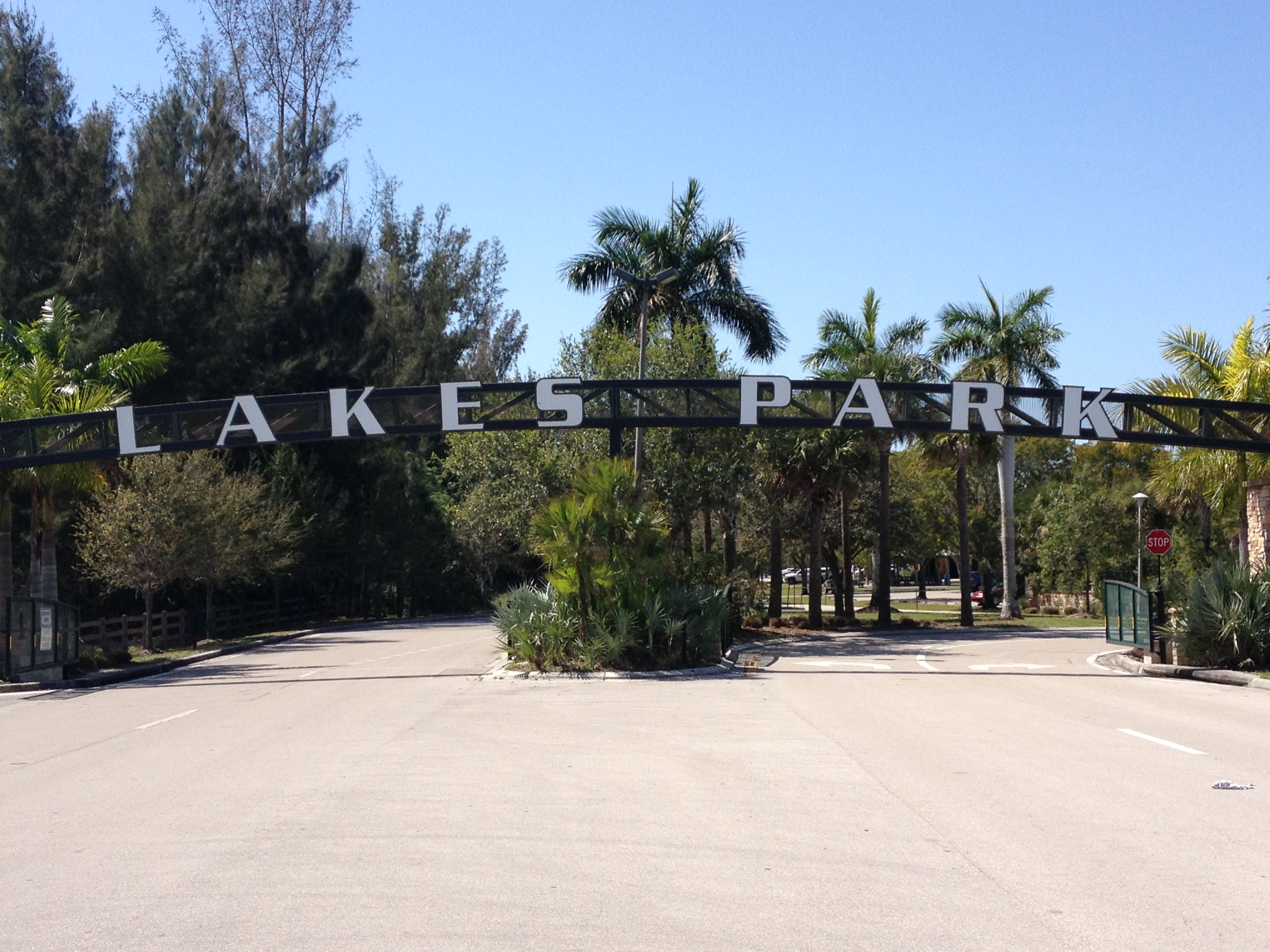
- Type: Regional (Lee County, Florida)
- Location: Fort Myers, Florida
- Area: 279 acres (113 ha)
- Created: 1984
- Operator: Lee County Department of Parks and Recreation
- Status: Open

Lakes Park (sometimes called Lakes Regional Park) is a 279-acre public park located along Gladiolus Drive (CR 865) just south of Fort Myers, Florida. It opened on April 21, 1984, and is operated by the Lee County Department of Parks and Recreation. The park was named after its main feature: 158 acres of man-made freshwater lakes. The park is part of the Great Florida Birding Trail as well as Lee County's Tour de Parks bicycle route.

== Features ==
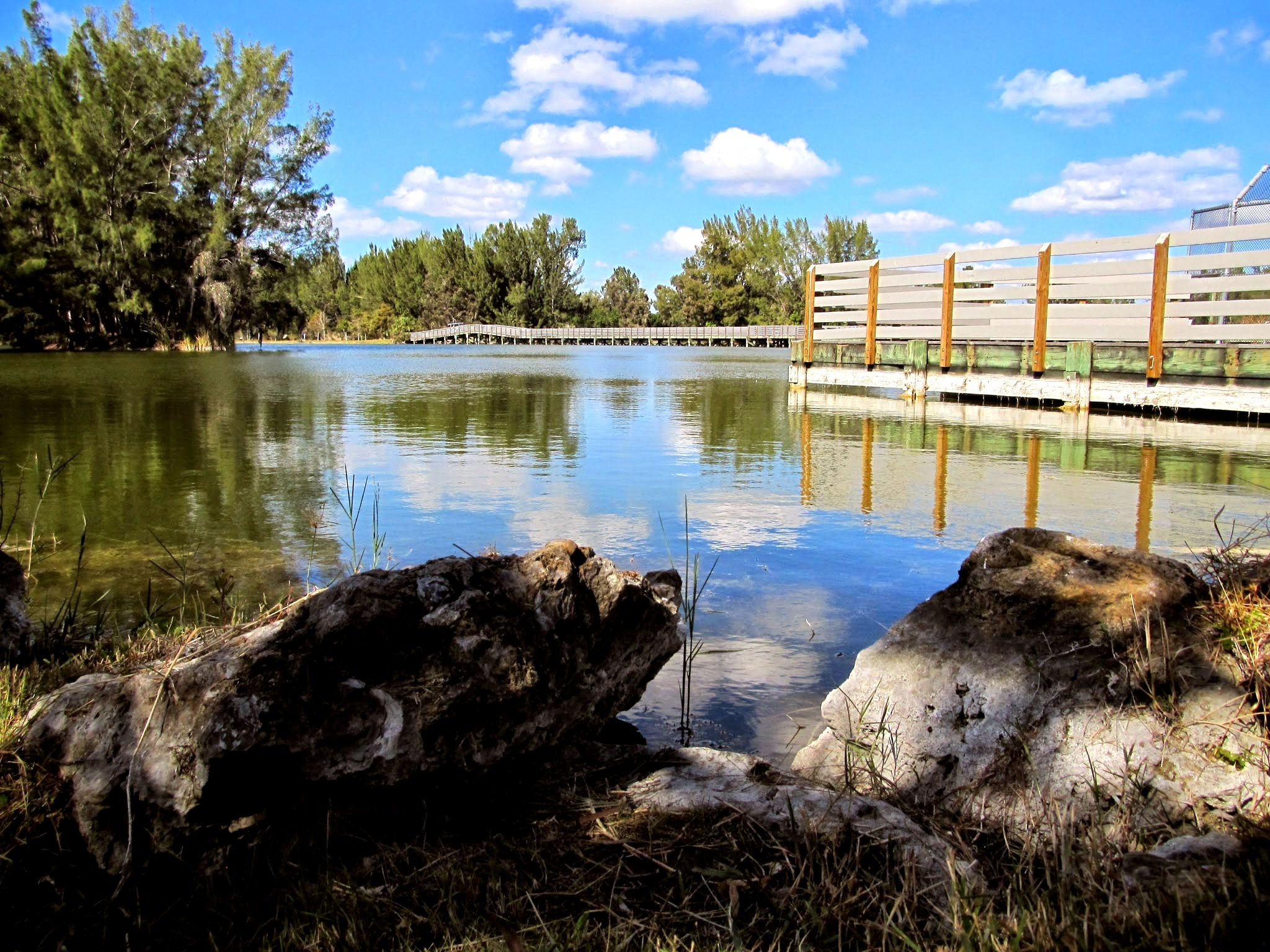
The Boardwalk over the lakes

The park includes about 2.5 miles of walking and biking trails running along the lakes. A scenic boardwalk carries the trails over the lakes. Other features include playgrounds, a large field for recreational activities, as well as a fragrance garden with herb, butterfly, and cactus gardens. A variety of wildlife can be spotted throughout Lakes Park, especially birds.

=== Train Village ===
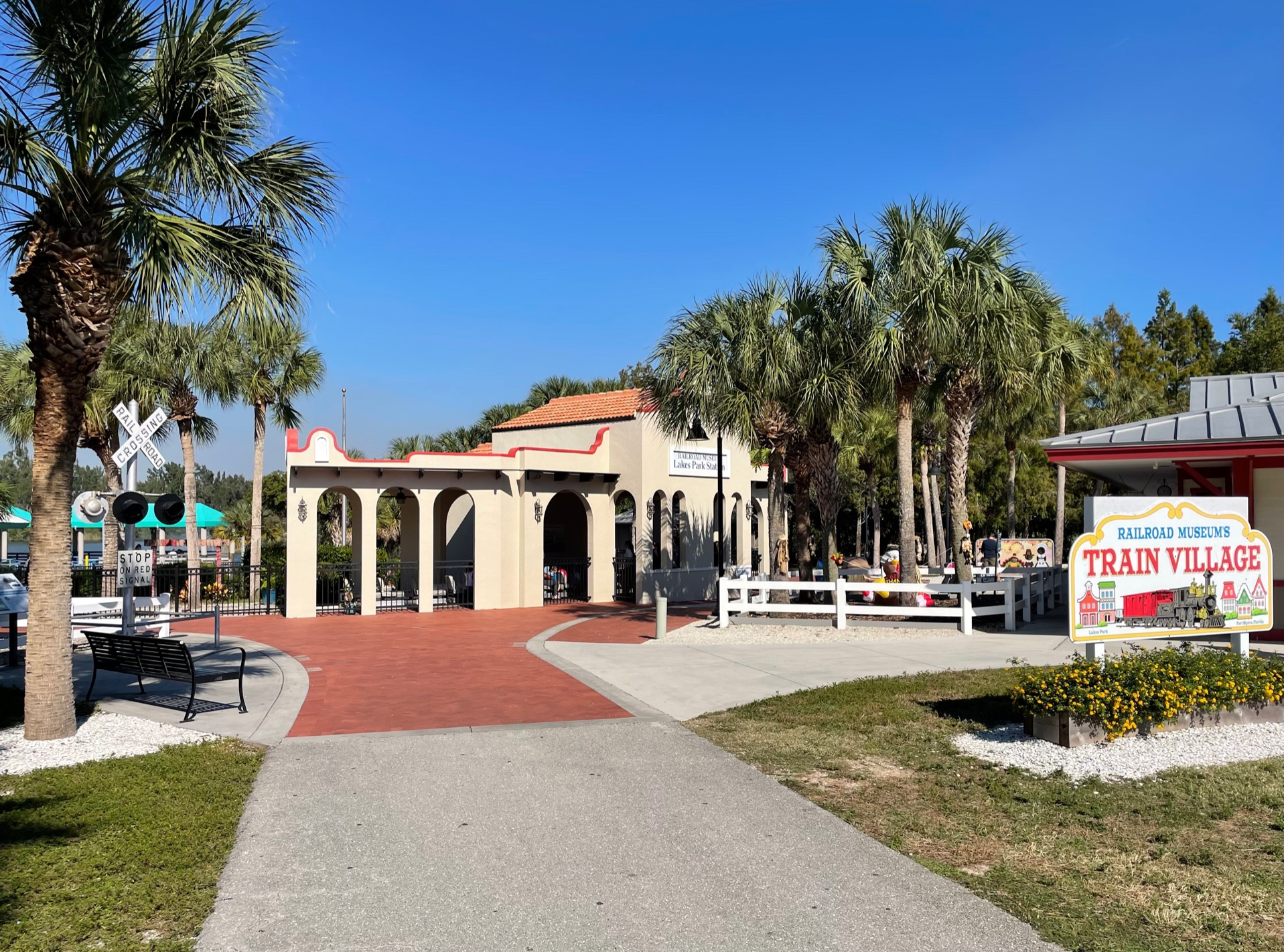
Train Village and loading platform for the miniature railroad

A section in the middle of the park is known as the Train Village. The train village includes the Railroad Museum of South Florida, a full size historic locomotive and caboose on display, and a children's playground.

The railroad museum also operates the Lakes Park & Gulf Railroad, a 7 1/2 in (190.5 mm) gauge miniature railway which takes riders on a 15-minute ride through the north end of the park. The miniature railway has carried over 300,000 passengers since it opened in 1994.

== History ==
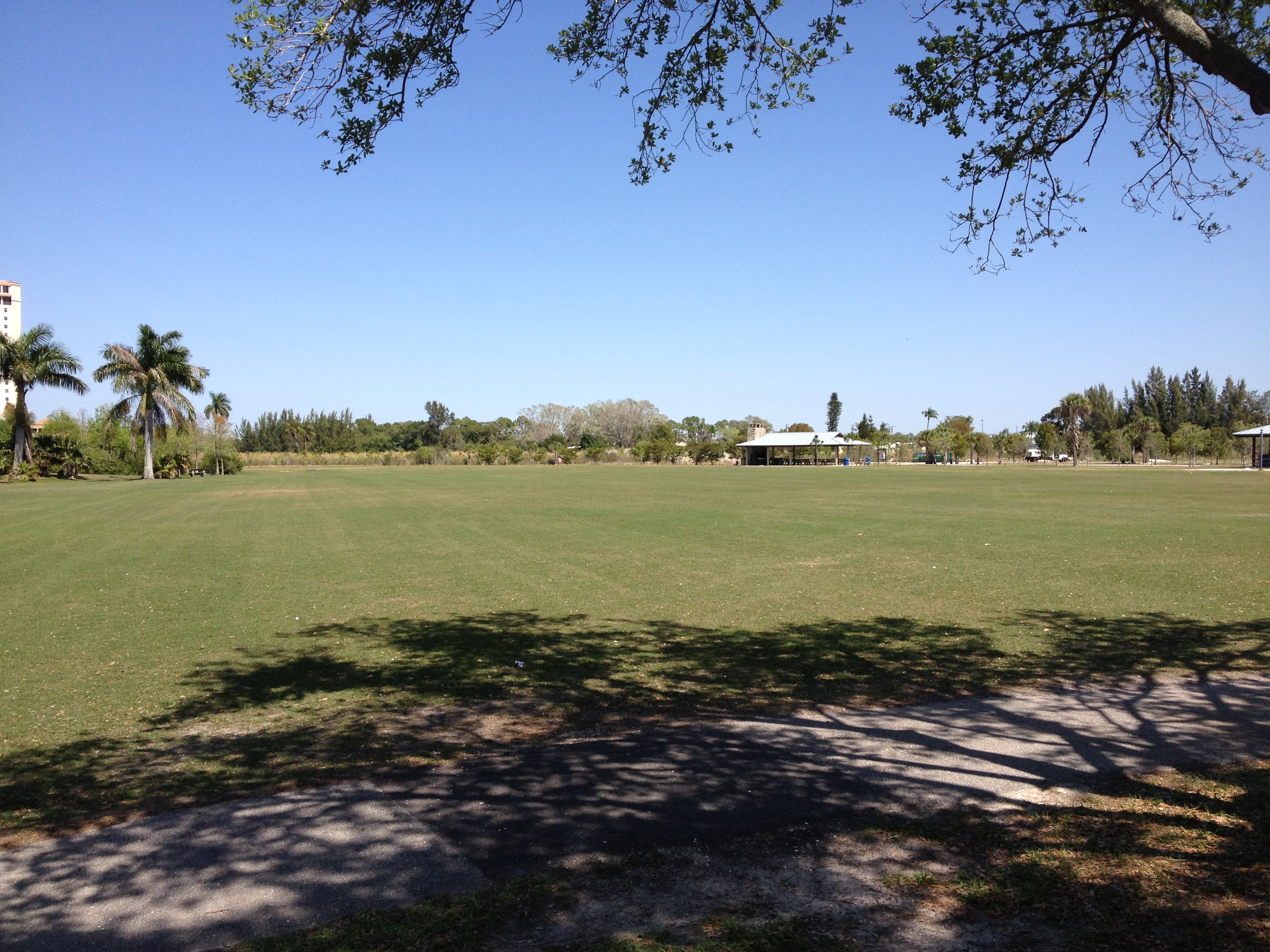
Recreational Field

Lakes Park opened on April 21, 1984. The park was built on the site of a former rock mine that operated on the site from 1956 to the mid 1960s. The lakes within the park were created are man-made and were excavated during the operation of the mine. The mine was owned by the West Coast Rock Co. and it operated from 1956 to the mid 1960s.

In 1958, the Atlantic Coast Line Railroad built a spur from their line along the Ten Mile Canal to serve the mine. The Atlantic Coast Line's rail spur, which ran along the present route of Six Mile Cypress Parkway, was built on the right of way of an earlier railroad branch built by the Seaboard Air Line Railroad (their Punta Rassa Subdivision). The Seaboard's track operated through the site from 1926 to 1952. The Train Village and Railroad Museum at the park are located just north of where the railroad previously existed and a historic plaque marks its location.

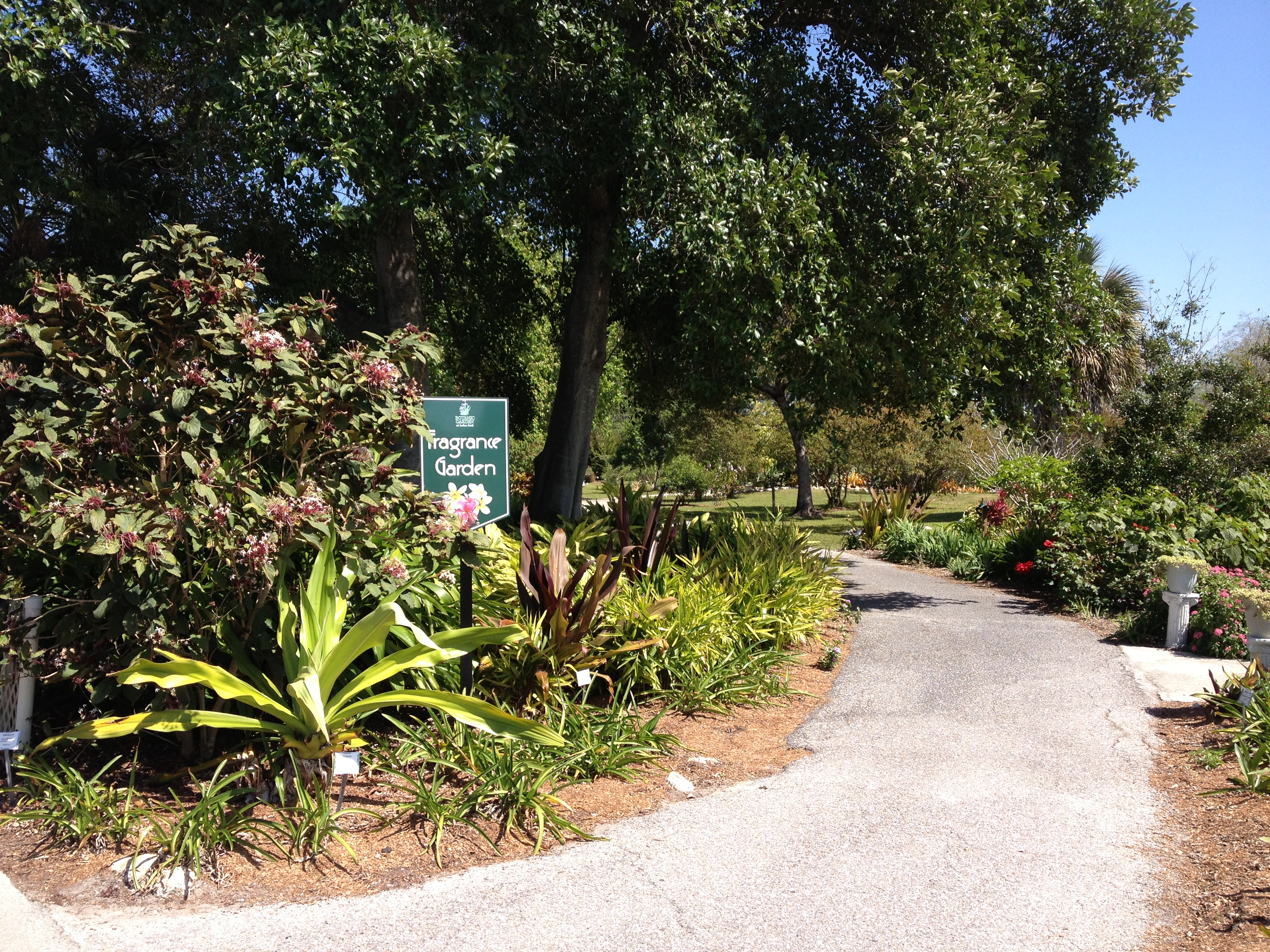
Entrance to Fragrance Garden
