= Deep Lake, Florida =

- Unincorporated community
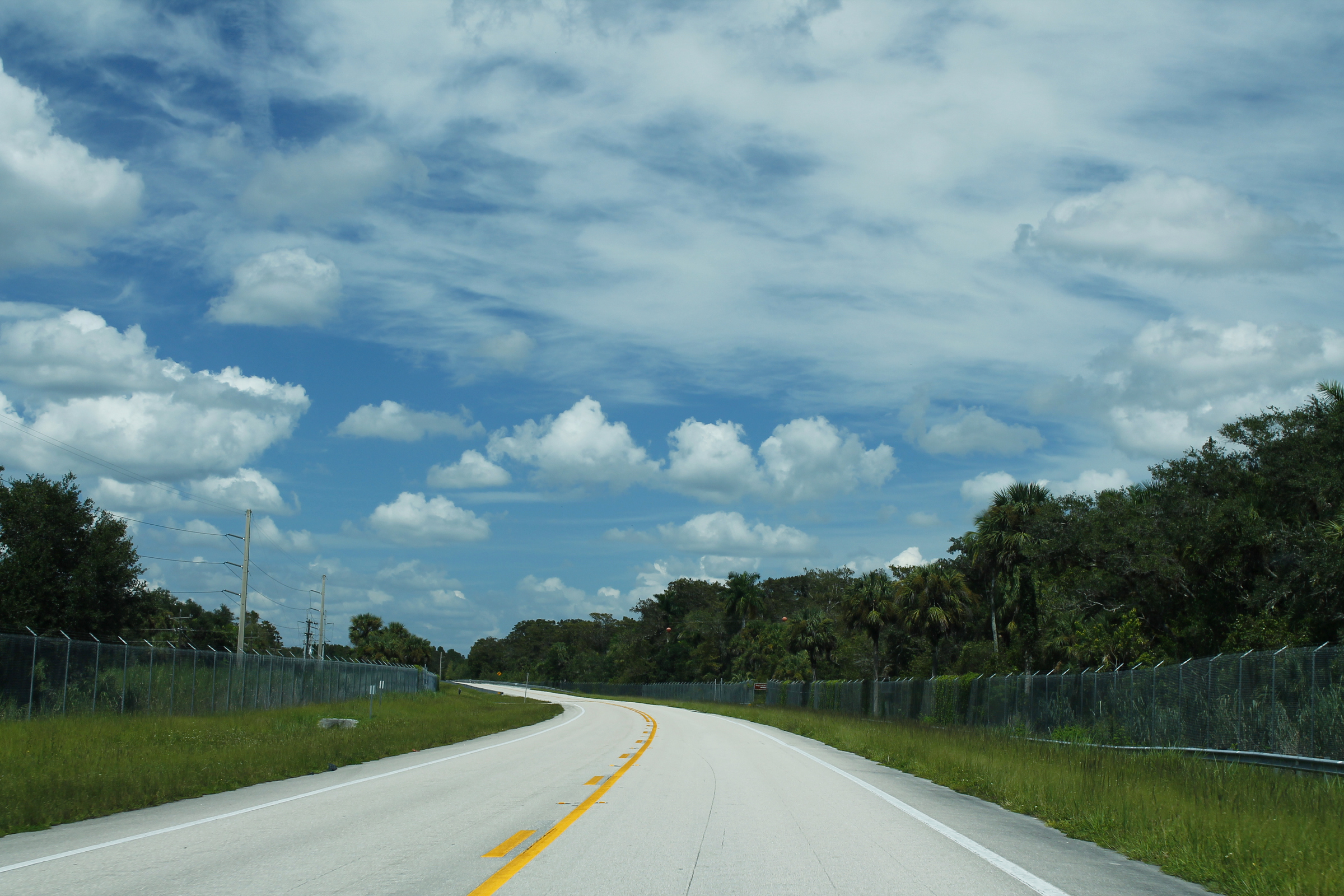
- Looking north toward the Deep Lake Fire Station

- Location within Florida Location within the United States
- Coordinates: 26°02′33″N 81°20′38″W
- Country: United States
- State: Florida
- County: Collier
- Time zone: UTC-5 (Eastern (EST))
  - Summer (DST): UTC-4 (EDT)
- ZIP codes: 34141
- GNIS feature ID: 294743

Deep Lake is an uninhabited unincorporated area in Collier County, Florida, United States. It is located between Immokalee and Everglades City along State Route 29. The area is named after Deep Lake, a 90 ft (27 m) deep naturally occurring sinkhole, which is the deepest lake south of Lake Okeechobee.

== History ==
Around 1901, Walter Langford and John Roach acquired a 300-acre (1.2 km^{2}) tract of land in the Deep Lake area, known as "Deep Lake Hammock," with plans to develop the land into a grapefruit growing and packing enterprise. After years of laborious work, 200 acres of the hammock had been cleared and seeds were planted.

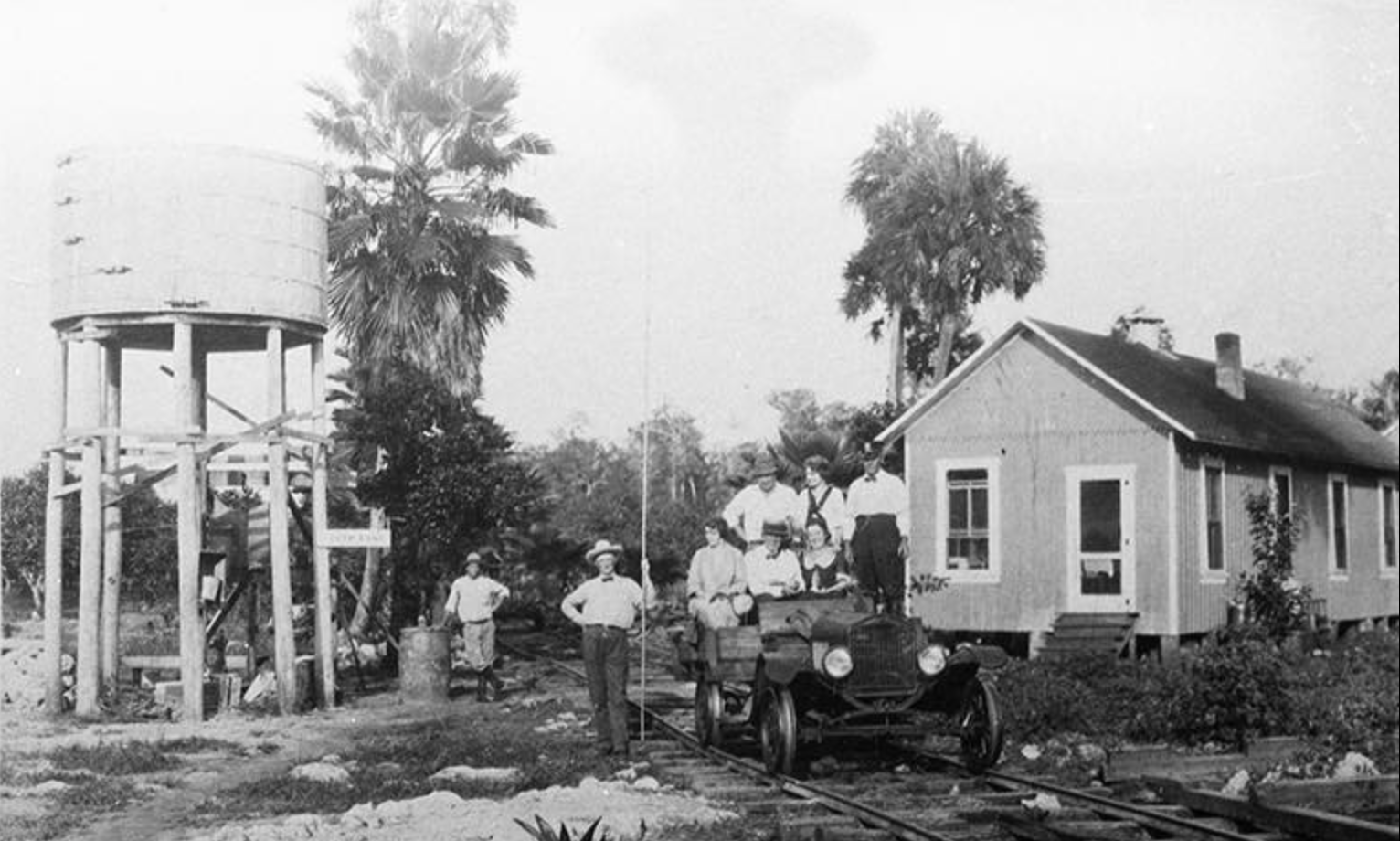
Deep Lake in 1920

=== Deep Lake Railroad ===
To facilitate the process of transporting the grapefruit to market, the partners needed to build their own rail system. The Deep Lake Railroad was built in 1913 and spanned 14 miles (23 kilometres) from Everglades City to Deep Lake.

Barron Collier, friend of Roach and namesake of Collier County, purchased the grapefruit grove and railroad in the early years of the 1920s. He would go on to buy more land in the surrounding area to grow the business, which would later be called "Deep Lake Grove & Cannery."

In 1928, the Atlantic Coast Line Railroad acquired the Deep Lake Railroad. After rebuilding the track to meet Coast Line specifications, the line was incorporated into the Haines City Branch, which would extend up through Immokalee and into Central Florida.

The railroad was removed in 1957.

== Geography ==
Deep Lake is located within the Big Cypress National Preserve. This particular section is higher in elevation and therefore drier than other areas of the preserve.
