= WITS (AM) =

Coordinates: 27°30′30″N 81°25′20″W

- Sebring, Florida; United States
- Broadcast area: Sebring, Florida
- Frequency: 1340 kHz
- Branding: Highlands 104.3

Programming
- Format: Classic hits

Ownership
- Owner: Cohan Radio Group
- Sister stations: WJCM, WWLL, WWOJ, WWTK

History
- First air date: November 24, 1959 (as WSEB)
- Former call signs: WSEB (1959–1984)

Technical information
- Licensing authority: FCC
- Facility ID: 57629
- Class: C
- Power: 1,000 watts
- Translator: 104.3 W282CP (Sebring)

Links
- Public license information: Public file; LMS
- Webcast: Listen Live
- Website: highlands1043.com

WITS is a commercial radio station in Sebring, Florida, United States, broadcasting to the Sebring area on 1340 AM. WITS is one of the more popular stations in the Sebring market, consistently placing among the top four stations in the market.

On January 1, 2022, WITS flipped to classic hits and adopting the "Highlands 104.3", utilizing the FM translator in its branding.

== Translators ==
In addition to the main station, WITS is relayed by an FM translator.

Broadcast translator for WITS
Call sign	Frequency	City of license	FID	ERP (W)	HAAT	Class	FCC info
W282CP	104.3 FM	Sebring, Florida	200623	250	133 m (436 ft)	D	LMS

== Previous logo ==
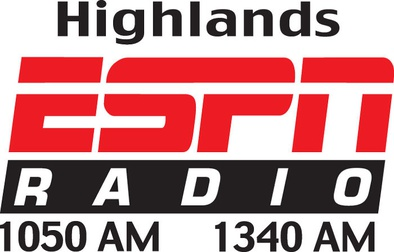
