= WWTK =

Coordinates: 27°24′25″N 81°25′56″W

- Lake Placid, Florida; United States
- Broadcast area: Sebring
- Frequency: 730 kHz
- Branding: NewsTalk 730 AM - 95.3 FM

Programming
- Format: News/Talk
- Affiliations: Fox News Radio; Premiere Networks; Salem Radio Network; Westwood One

Ownership
- Owner: Cohan Radio Group
- Sister stations: WWOJ, WWLL, WJCM, WITS

History
- First air date: May 22, 1989
- Former call signs: WLPF (1985–1989, CP)
- Call sign meaning: W W TalK

Technical information
- Licensing authority: FCC
- Facility ID: 27194
- Class: B
- Power: 500 watts day 340 watts night
- Translator: 95.3 W237FC (Lake Placid)

Links
- Public license information: Public file; LMS
- Webcast: Listen Live
- Website: newstalk730am.com

WWTK (730 AM) is a commercial radio station in Lake Placid, Florida, broadcasting to the Sebring area. WWTK's format is news/talk, and they run a slate of conservative commentators including The Rush Limbaugh Show, The Sean Hannity Show, Doctor Joy, Jerry Doyle and Jim Bohannon. The late night program is Coast to Coast AM. Sundays are dominated by religious programming. The station fares moderately well in the Sebring radio market, pulling a relatively stable 5.2 share, placing them sixth in the market.

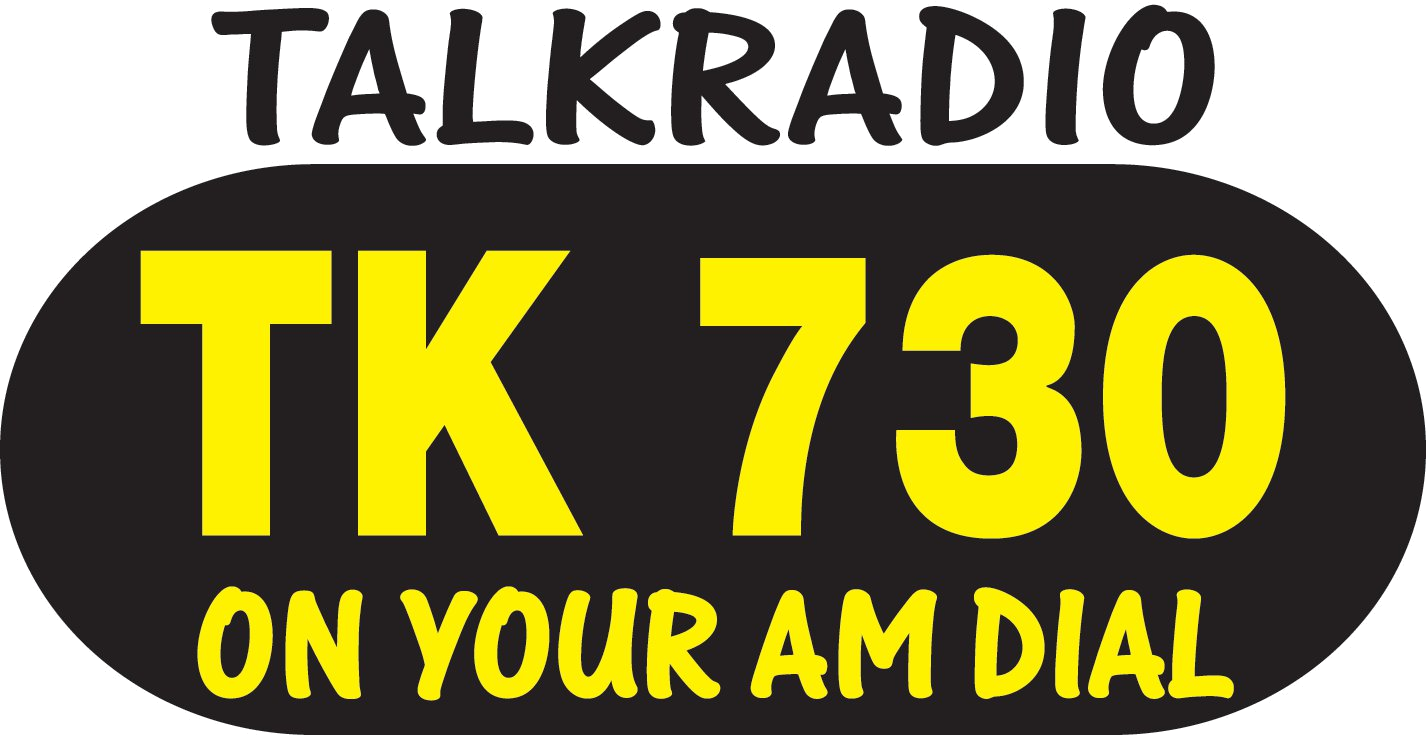
Former logo
