= WWOJ =

- Avon Park, Florida; United States
- Broadcast area: Sebring, Florida
- Frequency: 99.1 (MHz)
- Branding: OJ 99.1

Programming
- Format: Country

Ownership
- Owner: Cohan Radio Group
- Sister stations: WITS, WJCM, WWLL, WWTK

History
- First air date: June 22, 1982
- Former frequencies: 106.3 MHz (1982–1997)
- Call sign meaning: W W Orange Juice

Technical information
- Licensing authority: FCC
- Facility ID: 27199
- Class: C3
- ERP: 10,000 watts
- HAAT: 157 meters (515 feet)
- Transmitter coordinates: 27°30′39″N 81°34′54″W

Links
- Public license information: Public file; LMS
- Webcast: Listen Live
- Website: WWOJ website

WWOJ (99.1 FM) is a commercial radio station in Avon Park, Florida, broadcasting to the Sebring area. The stations is known as "OJ 99.1". The station's format is Country music, and the station consistently achieves the highest Arbitron ratings for the Sebring radio market.

WWOJ signed on in 1982 at 106.3 FM; the station's original format was adult standards/MOR. The current country format was adopted in 1985. WWOJ moved to its current 99.1 FM frequency with 10,000 watts of power in 1997.
