= WJCM =

Coordinates: 27°30′29″N 81°25′18″W

- Sebring, Florida; United States
- Broadcast area: Sebring, Florida
- Frequency: 1050 kHz
- Branding: ESPN Radio 1050 & 106.3

Programming
- Format: Sports
- Affiliations: ESPN Radio

Ownership
- Owner: Cohan Radio Group
- Sister stations: WITS, WWLL, WWOJ, WWTK

History
- First air date: May 22, 1950 (at 960)
- Former frequencies: 960 kHz (1950–1999)

Technical information
- Licensing authority: FCC
- Facility ID: 73124
- Class: D
- Power: 1,000 watts day 11 watts night
- Translator: 106.3 W292FP (Sebring)

Links
- Public license information: Public file; LMS
- Webcast: Listen live
- Website: highlandsespn.com

WJCM (1050 AM) is a commercial radio station in Sebring, Florida, broadcasting to the Sebring area. WJCM's format is sports, with programming from ESPN Radio.

WJCM is in Highlands County, Florida.

WJCM originally broadcast on 960 AM. For many years the studios located in downtown Sebring on Commerce St. On-air personalities included Ron Wilson, who also served as program director, and John Wright.

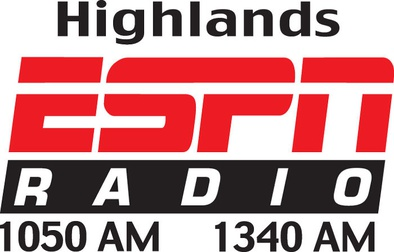
Logo while simulcasting with WITS

On July 1, 2016, WJCM changed their format from oldies to sports, with programming from ESPN Radio.

== Translators ==
In addition to the main station, WJCM is relayed by an FM translator.

Broadcast translator for WJCM
Call sign	Frequency	City of license	FID	ERP (W)	HAAT	Class	FCC info
W292FP	106.3 FM	Sebring, Florida	200620	250	133 m (436 ft)	D	LMS
