= River Ranch, Florida =

- Unincorporated community
- Location within Florida Location within the United States
- Coordinates: 27°46′16″N 81°12′25″W
- Country: United States
- State: Florida
- County: Polk
- Elevation: 56 ft (17 m)
- Time zone: UTC-5 (Eastern (EST))
  - Summer (DST): UTC-4 (EDT)
- ZIP code: 33867
- Area code: 863

River Ranch is an unincorporated community in far eastern Polk County, Florida, United States. The community is located on the west bank of the Kissimmee River, south of Florida State Road 60. Some of the community is occupied by the Westgate River Ranch Resort, a cowboy-themed resort. There is an ownership RV park adjacent to the resort, though it has no affiliation with Westgate. Resort amenities include a golf course, petting zoo, outdoor activities such as fishing and horseback riding, a restaurant and convenience store, and cabins. The resort is also home to the community's post office, which has ZIP code 33867, and a privately operated airport. The community also includes several privately owned homes, many of which are owned by sportsmen who use the surrounding land for outdoor sports. The remainder of River Ranch is occupied by the RRPOA (River Ranch Property Owners Association), A large, 44,000 acre, privately owned recreation property used for hunting, trail riding, camping and mudding, with entry by legal property owners with an active membership in RRPOA only. River Ranch is also a trailhead for the Florida Trail, which can be accessed through the KICCO Wildlife Management Area.
