= Pittsburg, Florida =

Town in Florida, U.S.

Coordinates: 27°39′14″N 81°30′09″W

Pittsburg is an unincorporated community in southern Polk County, Florida, United States, named for the city in Pennsylvania. Its elevation is 105 feet (32 m). It was mostly known for phosphate mining and a heavy industry rail spur (since abandoned), used mainly for transporting phosphates and cattle. It is approximately five miles (8 km) north of Avon Park.
