= Hicoria, Florida =

Coordinates: 27°12′23″N 81°24′05″W

Hicoria was a town in Highlands County, Florida. The site is listed as a populated place by GNIS. The town was situated 5 miles (8.0 km) south of Lake Placid and was established in the 1890s.

The town was located south of Florida State Road 70, between Old State Road 8 and U.S. Route 27. The Atlantic Coast Line Railroad had a stop at the town on their Haines City Branch. A lumber mill, owned by Mr. Roblin operated in Hicoria between 1928 and 1934.

== See also ==
- List of ghost towns in Florida
