= Lake Harbor, Florida =

- CDP
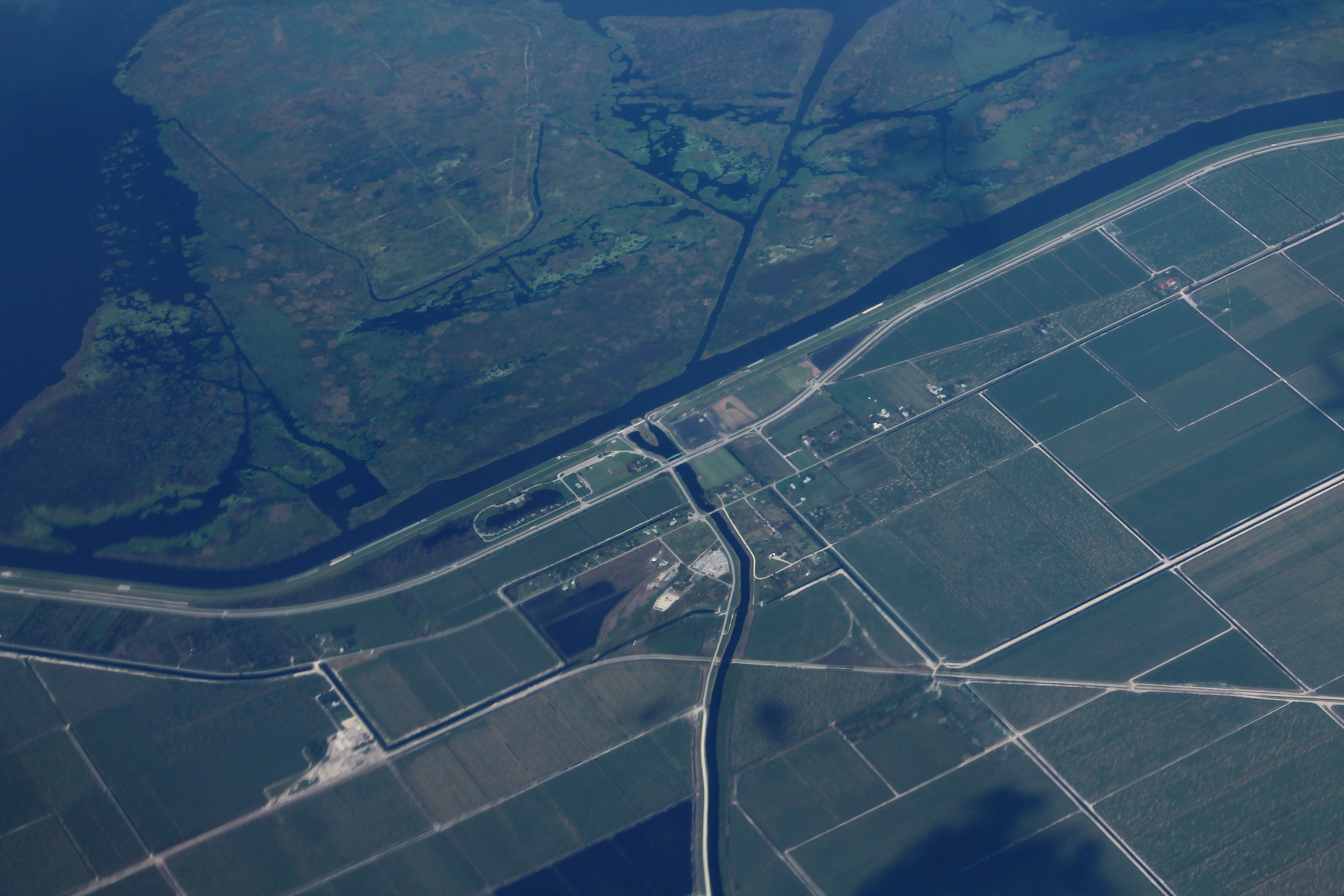
- Aerial view of Lake Harbor, Florida
- Interactive map of Lake Harbor, Florida
- Coordinates: 26°41′19″N 80°48′29″W
- Country: United States
- State: Florida
- County: Palm Beach

Area
  - Total: 1.32 sq mi (3.42 km^{2})
  - Land: 1.32 sq mi (3.42 km^{2})
  - Water: 0 sq mi (0.00 km^{2})
- Elevation: 10 ft (3.0 m)

Population (2020)
  - Total: 49
  - Density: 37.1/sq mi (14.33/km^{2})
- Time zone: UTC-5 (Eastern (EST))
  - Summer (DST): UTC-4 (EDT)
- ZIP code: 33459
- Area codes: 561, 728
- FIPS code: 12-38000
- GNIS feature ID: 2403191

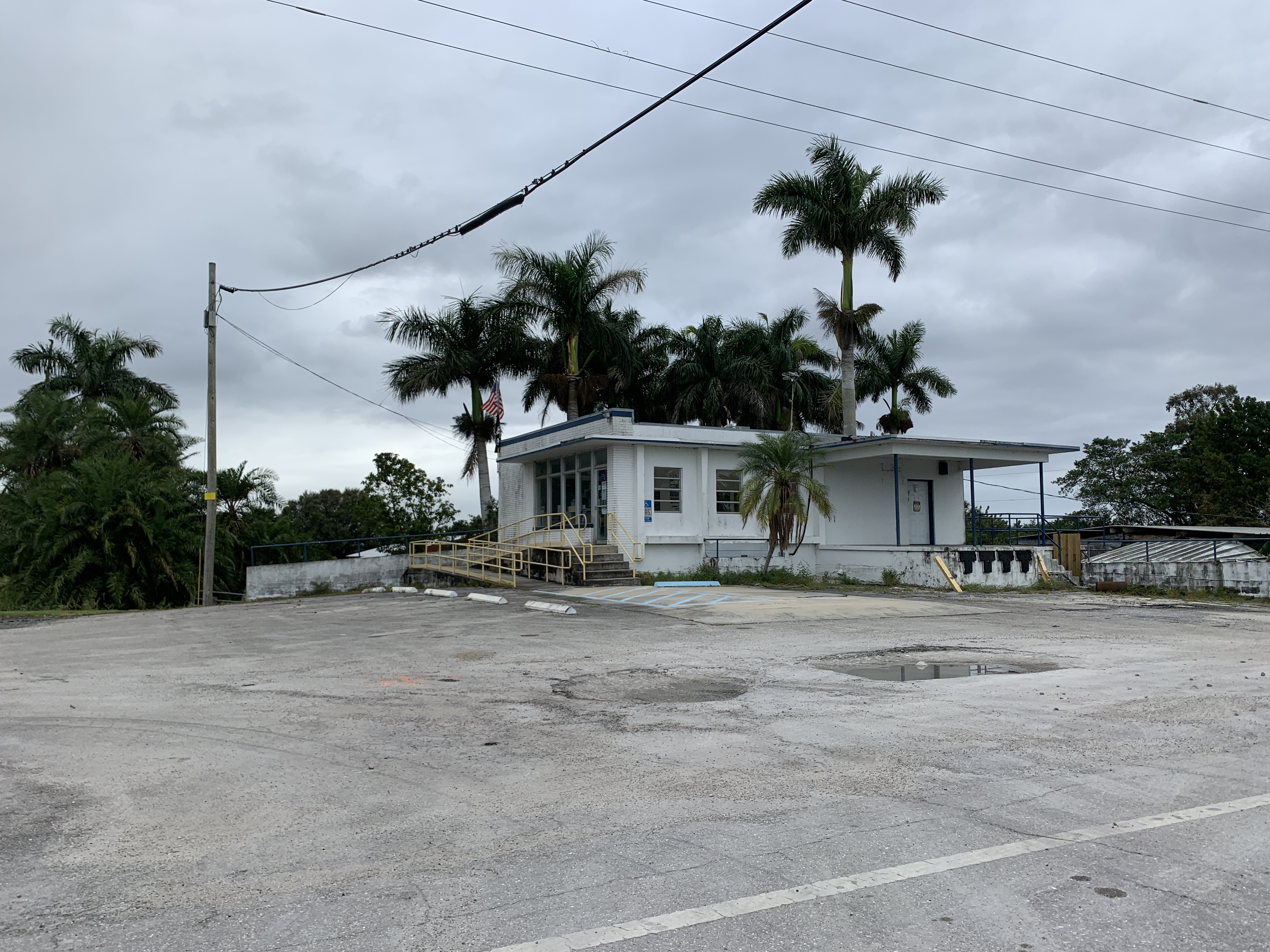
Post office at Lake Harbor, Florida

Lake Harbor is a census-designated place (CDP) in Palm Beach County, Florida, United States. It is part of the Miami metropolitan area of South Florida despite being physically and culturally closer to the Florida Heartland. The population was 49 at the 2020 US census.

== Geography ==
According to the United States Census Bureau, the CDP has a total area of 3.4 km^{2} (1.3 sq mi), all land. The community is centered at the intersection of Mutt Thomas Road and U.S. Route 27 (which runs concurrently with Florida State Road 80).

It is located along the southern banks of Lake Okeechobee, at the beginning of the Miami Canal. John Stretch Park is also located alongside the north end of Lake Harbor and the Lake Okeechobee.

== Demographics ==
Historical population
Census	Pop.	Note	%±
2000	195		—
2010	45		−76.9%
2020	49		8.9%
U.S. Decennial Census

=== 2020 census ===
Lake Belvedere Estates racial composition (Hispanics excluded from racial categories) (NH = Non-Hispanic)
Race	Number	Percentage
White (NH)	22	44.90%
Black or African American (NH)	13	26.53%
Native American or Alaska Native (NH)	0	0.00%
Asian (NH)	0	0.00%
Pacific Islander or Native Hawaiian (NH)	0	0.00%
Some Other Race (NH)	0	0.00%
Mixed/Multiracial (NH)	0	0.00%
Hispanic or Latino (any race)	14	28.57%
Total	49	100.00%

As of the 2020 United States census, there were 49 people, 15 households, and 15 families residing in the CDP.

=== 2010 census ===
Lake Harbor racial composition (Hispanics excluded from racial categories) (NH = Non-Hispanic)
Race	Number	Percentage
White (NH)	32	71.11%
Black or African American (NH)	4	8.89%
Native American or Alaska Native (NH)	0	0.00%
Asian (NH)	0	0.00%
Pacific Islander or Native Hawaiian (NH)	0	0.00%
Some Other Race (NH)	0	0.00%
Mixed/Multiracial (NH)	0	0.00%
Hispanic or Latino (any race)	9	20.00%
Total	45	100.00%

As of the 2020 United States census, there were 45 people, 0 households, and 0 families residing in the CDP.

=== 2000 census ===
As of the census of 2000, there were 195 people, 65 households, and 44 families residing in the CDP. The population density was 57.5 people/km^{2} (149 people/mi^{2}). There were 118 housing units at an average density of 34.8 units/km^{2} (90 units/mi^{2}). The racial makeup of the CDP was 41.54% White (35.9% were Non-Hispanic White), 42.56% African American, 3.08% Asian, 2.05% from other races, and 10.77% from two or more races. Hispanic or Latino of any race were 6.67% of the population.

In 2000, there were 65 households, out of which 32.3% had children under the age of 18 living with them, 50.8% were married couples living together, 12.3% had a female householder with no husband present, and 32.3% were non-families. 24.6% of all households were made up of individuals, and 4.6% had someone living alone who was 65 years of age or older. The average household size was 3.00 and the average family size was 3.55.

As of 2000, in the CDP, the population was spread out, with 29.2% under the age of 18, 5.1% from 18 to 24, 32.8% from 25 to 44, 22.6% from 45 to 64, and 10.3% who were 65 years of age or older. The median age was 39 years. For every 100 females, there were 105.3 males. For every 100 females age 18 and over, there were 106.0 males.

In 2000, the median income for a household in the CDP was $35,208, and the median income for a family was $31,250. Males had a median income of $36,458 versus $16,250 for females. The per capita income for the CDP was $12,977. None of the families and 9.7% of the population were living below the poverty line.

As of 2000, English was the first language for 100% of the population, however, only 25 people out of 195 residents answered the 2000 U.S. census' language section.

== Education ==
Lake Harbor Elementary was the only school in Lake Harbor; School District of Palm Beach County closed the school in 1972 the community is grouped within the School District of Palm Beach County, though the community is just over equidistant from the Henry County Schools' Clewiston High School compared to Palm Beach County's Glades Central High School. Numerous charter and private schools are also located in the area, the largest of which being Glades Day School, and through Belle Glade, Lake Harbor additionally is within driving distance of numerous satellite university campuses and specialty education centers.

== Religion ==
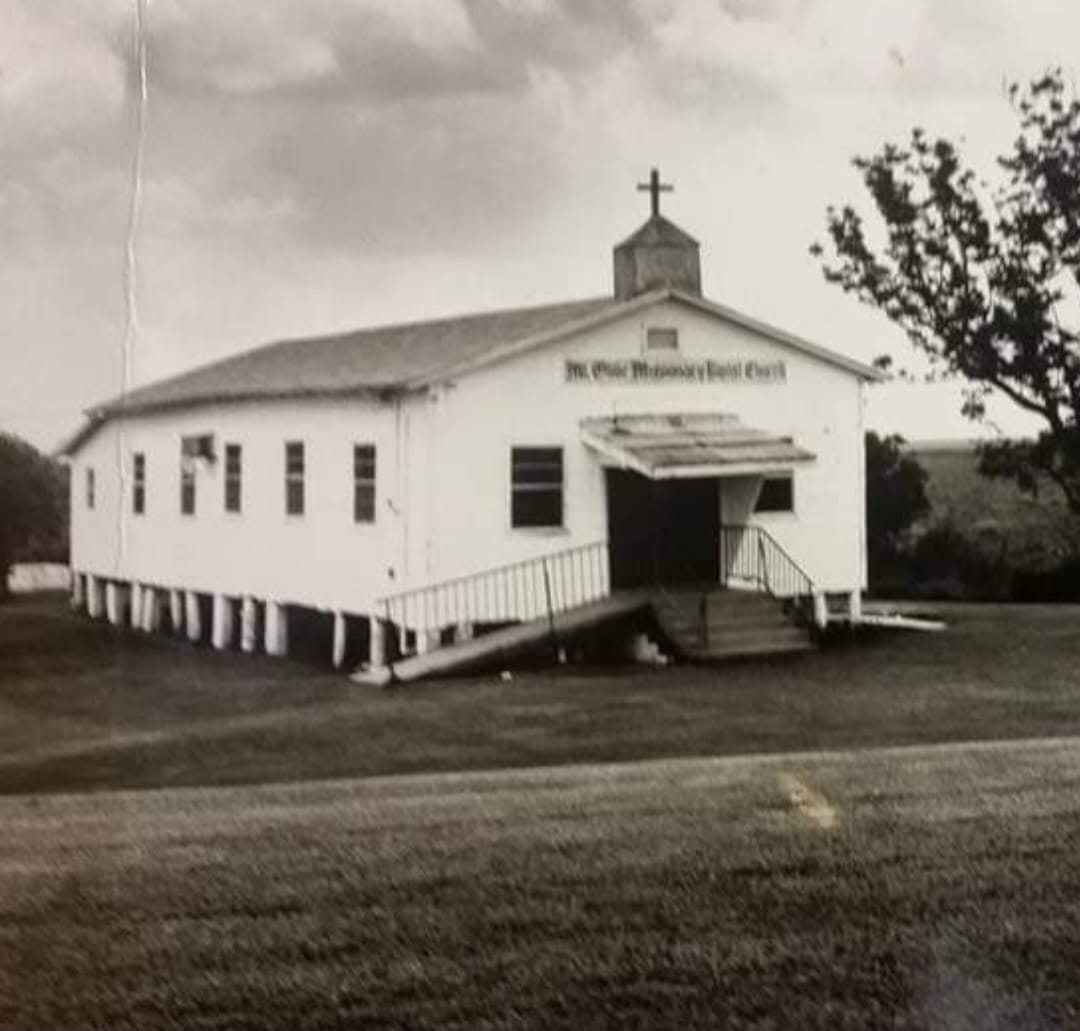
Mt. Olive Missionary Baptist Church of Lake Harbor

Mt. Olive Missionary Baptist Church of Lake Harbor was founded in 1924 by Pastor Riley on the west side of the Miami canal, along Miami Canal Road.

However, the young church faced a devastating setback in 1928 when the Okeechobee hurricane, also known as the San Felipe Segundo hurricane, struck the region. The hurricane's destructive force was overwhelming, and Mt. Olive Missionary Baptist Church was not spared. The church building was destroyed, leaving the congregation in a state of disarray and uncertainty.

In a remarkable act of generosity, Mutt Thomas, the owner and operator of C.A. Thomas Farms, donated both land and a new building for the church. The new location was on the east side of the Miami canal, along Mutt Thomas Road. With this gift, the church was able to rebuild and continue its mission.

Over the years, the church had several pastors, but one of the most prominent figures was Pastor Aaron Drayton. Under his leadership, the church experienced growth and expansion. Pastor Drayton also played a significant role in nurturing young ministers within the congregation. Among them were Pastor Willie C. Thornton, Pastor Freddie Lee Thornton, and Pastor John Holman, who were licensed under his guidance.

When Pastor Aaron Drayton retired, Pastor John Holman assumed the role of pastor.

However, in October 2005, Hurricane Wilma struck the area, once again wreaking havoc on the church. The building was destroyed, and the congregation faced the challenge of rebuilding yet again. Undeterred, Pastor John Holman and the devoted members of Mt. Olive Missionary Baptist Church found alternative locations to continue their worship and community activities.

== Transportation ==
Lake Harbor has limited access to outside regions by road, and the primary road links Lake Harbor are U.S. Route 27 and Florida State Road 80. Lake Harbor, however, is directly on the Okeechobee Waterway, enabling connections to multiple other regions of Lake Okeechobee and its maritime links.

Commercial air transport to Lake Harbor is limited, and the closest airport with commercial service to Lake Harbor is President Donald J. Trump International Airport, 50 miles away. Residents can also elect to utilize Fort Lauderdale–Hollywood International Airport or Southwest Florida International Airport, both of which are less than 80 miles away from Lake Harbor. General aviation has a much closer link to Lake Harbor, as Belle Glade State Municipal Airport is located less than ten miles away from the town.
