= 2025 Florida wildfires =

Natural disasters in the USA

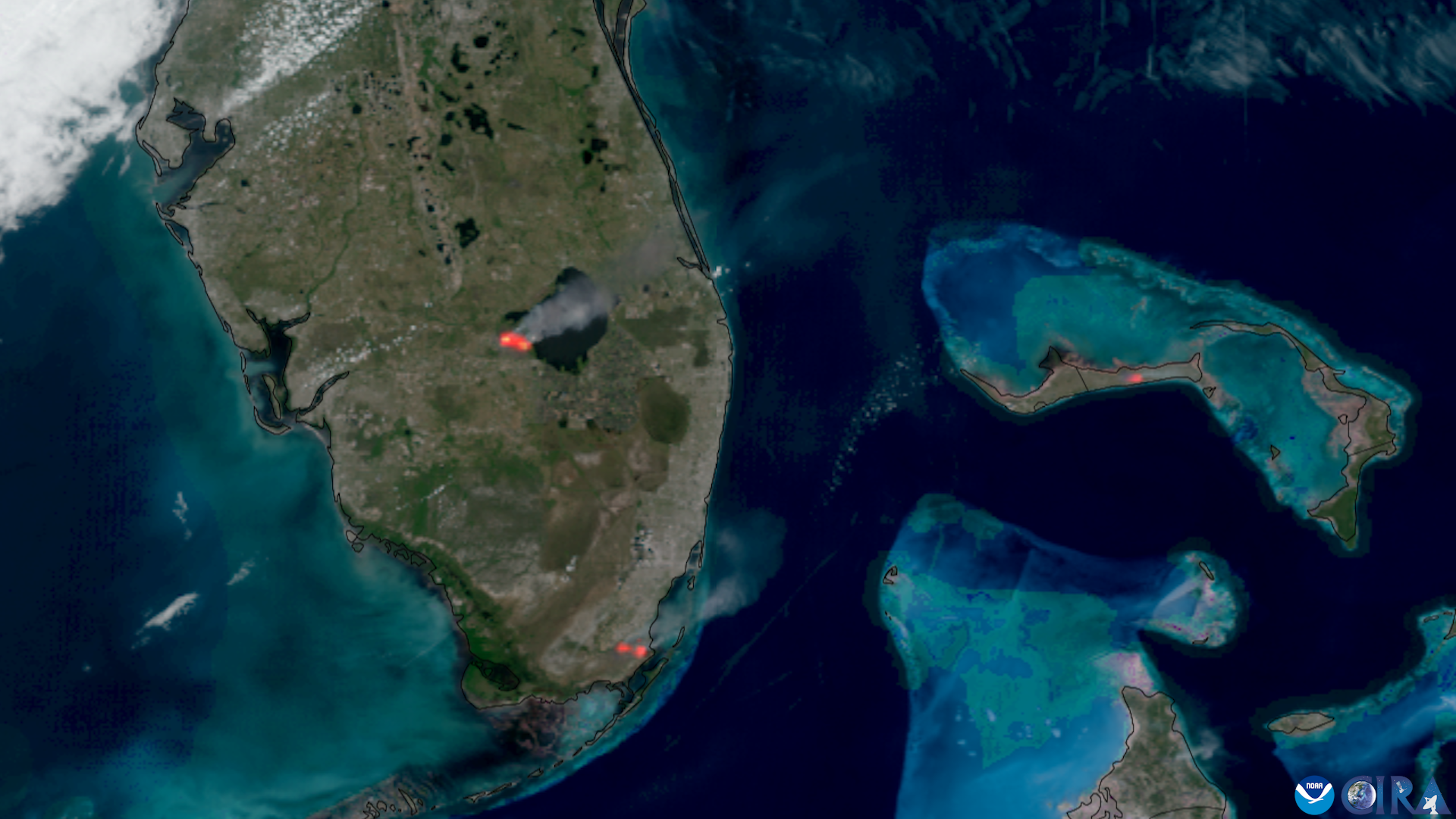
- Smoke in south Florida due to wildfires on March 20.

Statistics
- Total fires: 2,913
- Burned area: 228,183 acres

The 2025 Florida wildfires were a series of wildfires that burned in the U.S. state of Florida. As of July 2025, 2,531 fires have burned in Florida, with a total burned area of 146,761 acres.

== Background ==
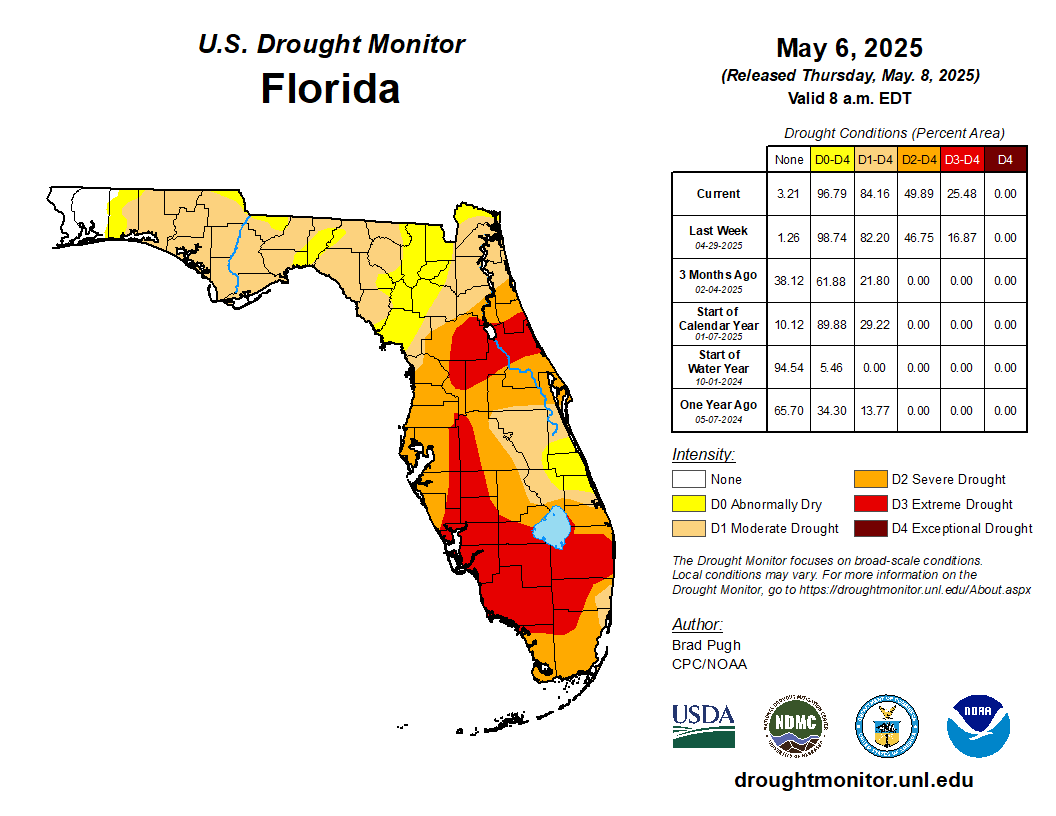
Florida Drought Monitor on May 6, 2025

Florida's wildfire season is shaped by its subtropical climate, seasonal rainfall shifts, human activity, and occasionally catastrophic weather events. The state traditionally experiences a prolonged dry season from October through May, during which wildfire risks are elevated. Central Florida and northern Florida typically sees its wildfire trends begin as early as January, with activity continuing into May or even early June—right before the onset of the rainy season and hurricane impacts.

Lightning is a potent natural ignition source—but its role is often overshadowed by human-caused fires, particularly those that originate from escaped yard debris burning and equipment sparks. In 2023, lightning accounted for more than 35% of wildfires, but the remainder were traced to human activities.

Florida's ecosystems—such as pine flatwoods and scrub—evolved with recurrent fire cycles, typically burning every 3 to 7 years to maintain ecological health. These fire-adapted landscapes depend on periodic burns to sustain species like the gopher tortoise and regenerating longleaf pine stands.

Major wildfire years have occurred in the past. One of the most destructive was the 1998 Florida wildfires, a series of thousands of fires sparked mostly by lightning and exacerbated by heavy vegetation growth followed by sudden drought conditions. These blazes scorched roughly 500,000 acres—including over 150 structures—before rains eventually helped contain them.

In recent years, wildfire seasons have remained active and in some cases expanded. Throughout 2023, over 2,600 wildfire incidents in Florida burned more than 101,000 acres. This year was fueled by La Niña-induced dryness, precipitation shortfalls, and vegetation damage from Hurricane Ian, prompting burn bans and Red Flag Warnings in many counties.

Hurricanes leave behind another major and often overlooked risk factor: downed trees and debris. These serve as abundant dry fuel. Experts warn that when combined with ongoing drought and drought-induced dryness, these remnants contribute significantly to early and intense fire outbreaks each spring.

== Summary ==
Florida’s 2025 wildfire season has seen several significant events by mid-season, driven by lightning ignitions, dry fuels, and wind in south Florida’s Everglades and brushland areas. According to the Florida Department of Agriculture and Consumer Services, as of early October, about 162,448 acres have burned statewide in 2025.

One of the largest and most prominent fires in Florida this year was the Mile Marker 39 Fire in Broward County. Ignited on August 18 by lightning in sawgrass fuels in the Everglades, it merged from two earlier fires (Mile Marker 39 + Sawgrass) and ultimately scorched about 48,000 acres before being reported fully contained.

Fuel conditions in 2025 were primed by a combination of factors: drought stress in some regions, lower-than-average moisture in grasses and sawgrass, and leftover debris from prior wet seasons contributing to greater fuel loads.

Smoke from large fire events like Mile Marker 39 has periodically degraded air quality across South Florida, prompting health advisories and visibility warnings, particularly in Broward and neighboring counties.

== List of wildfires ==
The following is a list of fires that have burned more than 1,000 acres (400 ha), or caused significant structural damage or casualties.

Name	County	Acres	Start date	Containment date (Note: Containment means that fire crews have established and secured control lines around the fire's perimeter. These lines are artificial barriers, like trenches or cleared vegetation, designed to stop the fire's spread, or natural barriers like rivers. Containment reflects progress in managing the fire but does not necessarily mean the fire is starved of fuel, under control, or put out.)	Notes/References
Two Barrel	Liberty	1,943	February 26	March 17	The fire caused $290,000 in damage.
Turkey Hammock	Brevard	1,171	February 28	March 22	
BOX-R (19-T5) 0161	Franklin	1,200	March 3	March 19	
The 344	Miami-Dade	26,719	March 12	April 4	
Johnson	Miami-Dade	8,340	March 18	May 13	
East Marsh	Volusia	3,377	March 31	April 7	
Juniper Swamp	Liberty	4,986	April 12	May 8	
Hilliardville	Wakulla	1,291	April 15	April 20	
Curry Island	Glades	1,050	April 18	May 1	
Sandy	Monroe	6,656	May 24	June 5	
Wood	Highlands	1,272	May 25	May 31	
Ollie Roberts Road	Hardee	1,350	June 10	June 12	
Indian Prairie Canal (22)	Glades	3,925	June 22	June 27	
Henry George West (29)	Hillsborough	1,200	June 24	July 1	
Mosquito	Monroe	8,373	July 1	July 11	
13 Mile	Palm Beach	13,000	July 7	July 15	
Iron	Miami-Dade	1,374	July 8	July 11	
Mile Marker 39	Broward	48,000	August 18	August 26	Lightning-caused. Merged with the lightning-caused Sawgrass Fire. Burned in Everglades National Park and winds from Hurricane Erin pushed smoke across South Florida.

Perimeters of 2025 Florida wildfires (map data)

== See also ==
- 2025 United States wildfires
