= Huntington, Marion County, Florida =

Unincorporated community in Florida, U.S.

Coordinates: 29°10′12″N 82°03′43″W

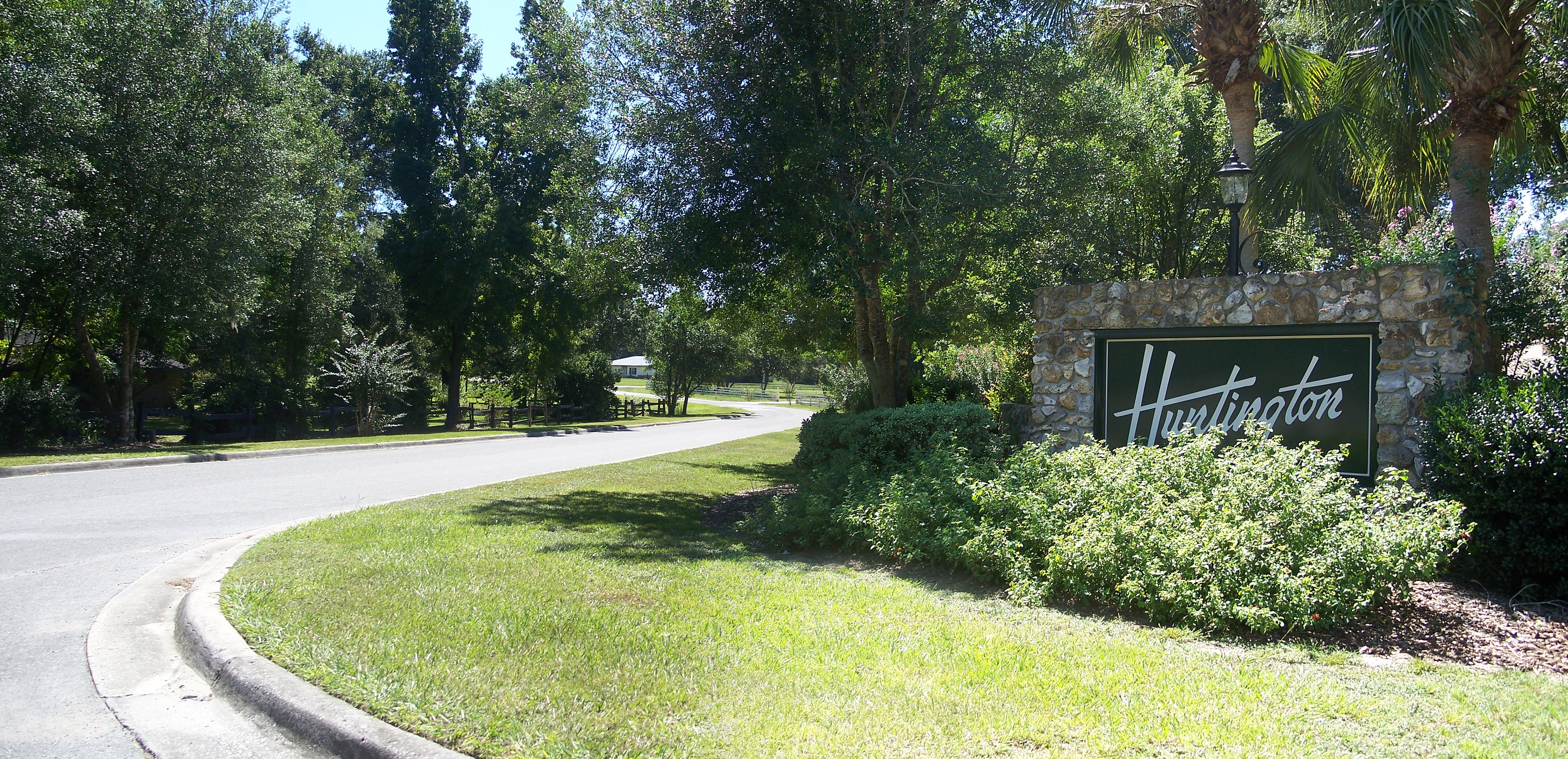
Entrance

Huntington is an unincorporated community in Marion County, Florida, United States, west of Baseline Road, between Ocala and Belleview. The community is part of the Ocala Metropolitan Statistical Area.
