= Harker, Florida =

Harker
- Unincorporated community
- Location within the state of Florida
- Coordinates: 26°20′36″N 81°20′36″W
- Country: United States
- State: Florida
- County: Collier
- Elevation: 23 ft (7.0 m)
- Time zone: UTC-5 (Eastern (EST))
  - Summer (DST): UTC-4 (EDT)
- GNIS feature ID: 295336

Harker was an unincorporated community located in Collier County, Florida, United States, about 40 kilometres (25 mi) East of the city of Bonita Springs and 8 kilometres (5.0 mi) Southeast of the town of Immokalee. Most maps indicate that Harker is located on State Road 29 between West Main Street to the North and Oil Well Road to the South. West of Harker is Summerland Swamp, and to the East is the Okaloacoochee Slough.

Harker is believed to have been settled as a farming community in the 1930s. It was a stop on the Haines City Branch branch of the Atlantic Coast Line Railroad and was home mainly to farm workers who road the train daily to work sites farther south. Farms in Harker were known for their "squash, potatoes, and large tomatoes". Harker is one of at least 15 communities in a contiguous 40-mile line that are now gone.

State Road 29 and the railroad were both built through Harker in the 1920s.

== See also ==
- List of ghost towns in Florida
