= Copeland, Florida =

- Unincorporated community
- Location within the state of Florida
- Coordinates: 25°57′13″N 081°21′21″W
- Country: United States
- State: Florida
- County: Collier
- Elevation: 3 ft (0.91 m)
- Time zone: UTC-5 (Eastern (EST))
  - Summer (DST): UTC-4 (EDT)
- ZIP code: 34137
- GNIS ID: 295218

Copeland is an unincorporated community located in eastern Collier County, Florida, United States. It lies at the junction of State Road 29 and Janes Memorial Scenic Drive (County Road 837). Copeland lies along the western border of the Big Cypress National Preserve, and wedged beside the Fakahatchee Strand Preserve State Park to the east. The hamlet of Jerome is a few miles to the north, while Carnestown lies a few miles to the south at the intersection of State Road 29 and U.S. Route 41. Copeland is part of the Naples–Marco Island Metropolitan Statistical Area.

== History ==
Copeland was founded in 1932 and named in honor of David Graham Copeland, a U.S. Navy engineer who helped plan the Tamiami Trail and began a family-owned farming business at this location.

During the Second World War, the demand for cypress brought the timber industry to southwest Florida. The newly established Lee Cypress Lumber Company began operations in 1943 and made Copeland a company town. The operation was overseen by superintendent J.R. Terill, and Copeland served as the base camp for over three hundred sawyers, railroad workers, and their families. Homes were made of cypress and built on-site as the population increased. Most of the people living at Copeland were black and the community was segregated with separate facilities for white and black workers. The town boasted a commissary and a few "jukes" for entertainment. Almost all functions including entertainment were overseen by the Lee Cypress Company. A large railroad depot handled the logs that were brought out of the Fakahatchee Strand and other parts of the Big Cypress Swamp, the current Jane's Scenic Drive following the route of the main railroad line through Fakahatchee. The logs were sent to the massive sawmill complex in Perry, Florida, four hundred miles north. The last steam locomotive used to carry timber is on display at the Collier County Museum in Naples. Copeland's population dwindled quickly in the late Fifties as the timber industry concluded its operations in 1957.

== Demographics ==
The population was estimated at 275 people in 2006. Copeland also lies within a Florida panther habitat.
