= List of county roads in Manatee County, Florida =

List of county roads in Manatee

- County road shields used in Florida

Highway names
- Interstates: Interstate X (I-X)
- US Highways: U.S. Highway X (US X)
- State: State Road X (SR X)
- County: County Road X (CR X)

System links
- County roads in Florida; County roads in Manatee County

The following is a list of county roads in Manatee County, Florida.

== County Road 10 ==
County Road 10
- Location: Rubonia
- Length: 4.2 mi (6.8 km)

County Road 10 (CR 10) is 69th Street West near Rubonia. CR 10 begins at US 41 (Tamiami Trail) near Rubonia. It runs east and crosses over Interstate 75 before turning south. CR 10 crosses CSX's out-of-service Parrish Spur and terminates at Erie Road.

== County Road 39 ==
County Road 39
- Location: Duette
- Length: 4.1 mi (6.6 km)

County Road 39 (CR 39) runs from SR 62 just west of Duette north to the Hillsborough County line.

== County Road 43 ==
County Road 43
- Location: Palmetto–Snead Island
- Length: 3.1 mi (5.0 km)

County Road 43 (CR 43) is 10th Street West connecting Palmetto with Snead Island. 10th Street West runs from Palmetto west three miles through residential areas to Snead Island. On Snead Island, it runs along 13th Street West. Previously part of SR 43, it is essentially the western extension of SR 43, which is the hidden designation for US 301 north of Palmetto.

The county maintains 10th Street West from 8th Avenue West to Snead Island. From 28th Avenue to US 41 Business, it is maintained by the city of Palmetto. The state maintains the rest of 10th Street West between US 41 Business and US 41/US 301.

The first bridge to Snead Island was built in 1920 using disassembled pieces of the former Davis Toll Bridge which previously crossed the Manatee River between Bradenton and Palmetto. In 1932, a slightly taller bridge was built using disassembled pieces of the original Longboat Pass Bridge. The current bridge was built in 1957.

== County Road 64 ==
County Road 64
- Location: Bradenton
- Length: 4.5 mi (7.2 km)

County Road 64 (CR 64) is the unsigned designation for 75th Street Northwest on the west side of Bradenton.

== County Road 610 ==
County Road 610
- Location: Lakewood Ranch
- Length: 5.4 mi (8.7 km)

County Road 610 (CR 610) is University Parkway from US 41 along the Manatee/Sarasota County line to Interstate 75 near Lakewood Ranch.

== County Road 675 ==
County Road 675
- Location: Waterbury–Parrish
- Length: 16.9 mi (27.2 km)

County Road 675 (CR 675) is Waterbury Road and Rutland Road through Waterbury and Parrish.

=== Route description ===
CR 675 begins at an intersection with SR 70 about 10 miles northwest of Myakka City. From SR 70, CR 675 runs north along Waterbury Road. It passes through the community of Waterbury before coming to an intersection with SR 64 near Lake Manatee. At SR 64, CR 675 becomes discontinuous and resumes across Lake Manatee less than half a mile east on SR 64. From SR 64, CR 675 continues north on Rutland Road. It runs northwest through rural areas before turning west and terminating at US 301 in Parrish.

=== History ===
Waterbury Road was originally signed SR 161. Rutland Road was originally SR 309. After the 1945 Florida state road renumbering, both Waterbury Road and Rutland Road were designated SR 675.

=== Major intersections ===
Location	mi	km	Destinations	Notes
	0.0	0.0	SR 70	
	5.3	8.5	SR 64	brief gap in route
Parrish	16.9	27.2	US 301 (SR 43)	
1.000 mi = 1.609 km; 1.000 km = 0.621 mi

== County Road 683 ==
County Road 683
- Location: Tallevast–Oneco–Ellenton–Gillette–Parrish
- Length: 18.9 mi (30.4 km)

County Road 683 (CR 683) exists in three segments in Tallevast, Oneco, Ellenton, Gillette, and Parrish.

=== Route description ===
CR 683 begins at University Parkway (CR 610) near Sarasota–Bradenton International Airport. Manatee County maintains the route to University Parkway despite the fact that the southernmost 500 feet of the route are in Sarasota County. From University Parkway, CR 683 runs west along West University Parkway, then north along 15th Street (also known as 301 Boulevard) through Tallevast and Oneco. It intersects SR 70 in Oneco. Just north of SR 70, CR 683 (301 Boulevard) turns northwest splitting off of 15th Street (which continues north as a spur of SR 70). CR 683 continues northwest along 301 Boulevard and intersects US 41 in South Bradenton. CR 683 then passes the now-defunct DeSoto Square Mall before coming to its terminus at 9th Street West.

CR 683 resumes north of the Manatee River in Ellenton. It runs from US 301 north along 36th Avenue North (also known as Ellenton Gillette Road). It crosses over Interstate 275 and terminates at Moccasin Wallow Road in the ghost town of Gillette.

The third segment of CR 683 runs along Moccasin Wallow Road. Moccasin Wallow Road begins at US 41 (Tamiami Trail) in Gillette and runs east. It intersects with Interstate 75 and continues east to Parrish. It terminates at US 301 in Parrish.

=== History ===
Much of CR 683 consists of former alignments of SR 683. When designated in 1945, SR 683 ran from Sarasota along Bradenton Road and 15th Street to SR 70 in Oneco, with 15th Street continuing north of here as part of SR 70. 15th Street and Bradenton Road in Sarasota were originally a continuous road known as Range Road. Range Road was built in 1912 and it was the first road connecting Bradenton and Sarasota.

SR 683 resumed on the other side of the Manatee River north along Ellenton Gillette Road and then west along Moccasin Wallow Road to US 41 (Tamiami Trail). Prior to the 1945 Florida State Road renumbering, SR 683 south of the Manatee River was SR 356 and it was SR 310 north of the river.

US 301 was extended south from Tampa to Sarasota in the early 1950s. US 301 entered Bradenton concurrently with US 41 over the Manatee River on the original Green Bridge. US 301 then split off from US 41 in Bradenton and ran south along 9th Street West before turning southeast on a new alignment (present-day 301 Boulevard) to Oneco, where it merged with 15th Street and continued south. SR 683 was extended along this route as the hidden designation of US 301 between Bradenton and Sarasota. At the Sarasota/Manatee County line, US 301/SR 683 turned east on a new alignment and entered Sarasota along Washington Boulevard. The previous alignment of SR 683 in Sarasota (Bradenton Road) was then designated SR 683A. 15th Street/301 Boulevard has been severed from Bradenton Road in Sarasota due to extensions of Runway 14/32 at Sarasota–Bradenton International Airport.

In 1957, US 301 was rerouted to cross the Manatee River on the newly-built Hernando Desoto Bridge with US 301 turning north along present-day US 41 (SR 55). This removed the US 301 from the northernmost 0.6 miles of present-day 301 Boulevard.

In 1985, US 301 and SR 683 were realigned further east between Bradenton and the Sarasota/Manatee County line along a former railroad route. After the realignment, the former route became CR 683 as it is today.

Moccasin Wallow Road east of CR 683 in Gillette to Parrish was previously designated County Road 6 (CR 6). Around 2013, Moccasin Wallow Road was redesignated as part of CR 683 and signage at the I-75 interchange was changed accordingly.

=== Major intersections ===
South segment

Location	mi	km	Destinations	Notes
Sarasota–Manatee county line	0.0	0.0	CR 610 (University Parkway)	junction 500 feet south of Sarasota County line
Oneco	4.6	7.4	SR 70 (53rd Avenue)	
South Bradenton	6.3	10.1	US 41 (SR 55)	
South Bradenton	6.9	11.1	9th Street West	
1.000 mi = 1.609 km; 1.000 km = 0.621 mi

Middle segment

Location	mi	km	Destinations	Notes
Ellenton	0.0	0.0	US 301 (SR 43)	
	3.7	6.0	CR 10 (69th Street West)	
Gillette	5.5	8.9	CR 683 (Mocassin Wallow Road)	
1.000 mi = 1.609 km; 1.000 km = 0.621 mi

North segment

Location	mi	km	Destinations	Notes
	0.0	0.0	US 41 (Tamiami Trail / SR 45)	
Gillette	0.8	1.3	CR 683 south (Ellenton Gillette)	
	2.3	3.7	I-75 – Tampa, Naples	Exit 229 on I-75
Parrish	7.1	11.4	US 301 (SR 43)	
1.000 mi = 1.609 km; 1.000 km = 0.621 mi

== County Road 780 ==
County Road 780
- Length: 9.1 mi (14.6 km)

County Road 780 (CR 780) is Clay Gully Road in eastern Manatee County. It was once part of SR 780, which still exists further west in Sarasota County.

== County Road 789 ==
County Road 789
- Location: Anna Maria Island
- Length: 3.3 mi (5.3 km)

County Road 789 (CR 789) is the former designation for Gulf Drive north of Manatee Avenue (SR 64) on Anna Maria Island. It was previously part of SR 789. It has since been turned over to city control. The city of Holmes Beach has redesignated as City Road 789 with its own unique shield.
