= Parmalee, Florida =

- Unincorporated community
- Location within Florida Location within the United States
- Coordinates: 27°22′16″N 82°13′05″W
- Country: United States
- State: Florida
- Counties: Manatee
- Elevation: 66 ft (20 m)
- Time zone: UTC-5 (Eastern (EST))
  - Summer (DST): UTC-4 (EDT)
- Area code: 941
- GNIS feature ID: 294880

Parmalee, Florida was a short-lived town and stop on the East and West Coast Railway in Manatee County, Florida, United States. Located at the modern day intersection of Betts Road and State Road 70, the area remains largely undeveloped or agricultural.

== History ==
Parmalee was established in 1915 as a stop on the East and West Coast Railway between Verna and Myakka City. In January 1917, a post office was opened at Parmalee. Parmalee never grew beyond a small railway stop. It was home to a rice mill and grist mill as well as one store and storehouse. The town primarily relied on the lumber industry via the Updegraff Lumber Company mill.

In 1926, the lumber company (by then known as Roux-Askew Lumber) sold a large tract of land which included the town of Parmalee to the Constructive Agricultural Syndicate of New York City. The organization cleared the land and developed multi-acre farming lots.

A few months after the sale, the post office at Parmalee was closed, and the area ceased to go by that name, being largely absorbed into the growing nearby town of Myakka City.

== See also ==
- List of ghost towns in Florida
