= East and West Coast Railway =

Historic railroad in Florida

- Map of the East and West Coast Railway

Overview
- Locale: Bradenton, Florida; Arcadia, Florida
- Dates of operation: 1915–1933
- Successor: Seaboard Air Line Railroad

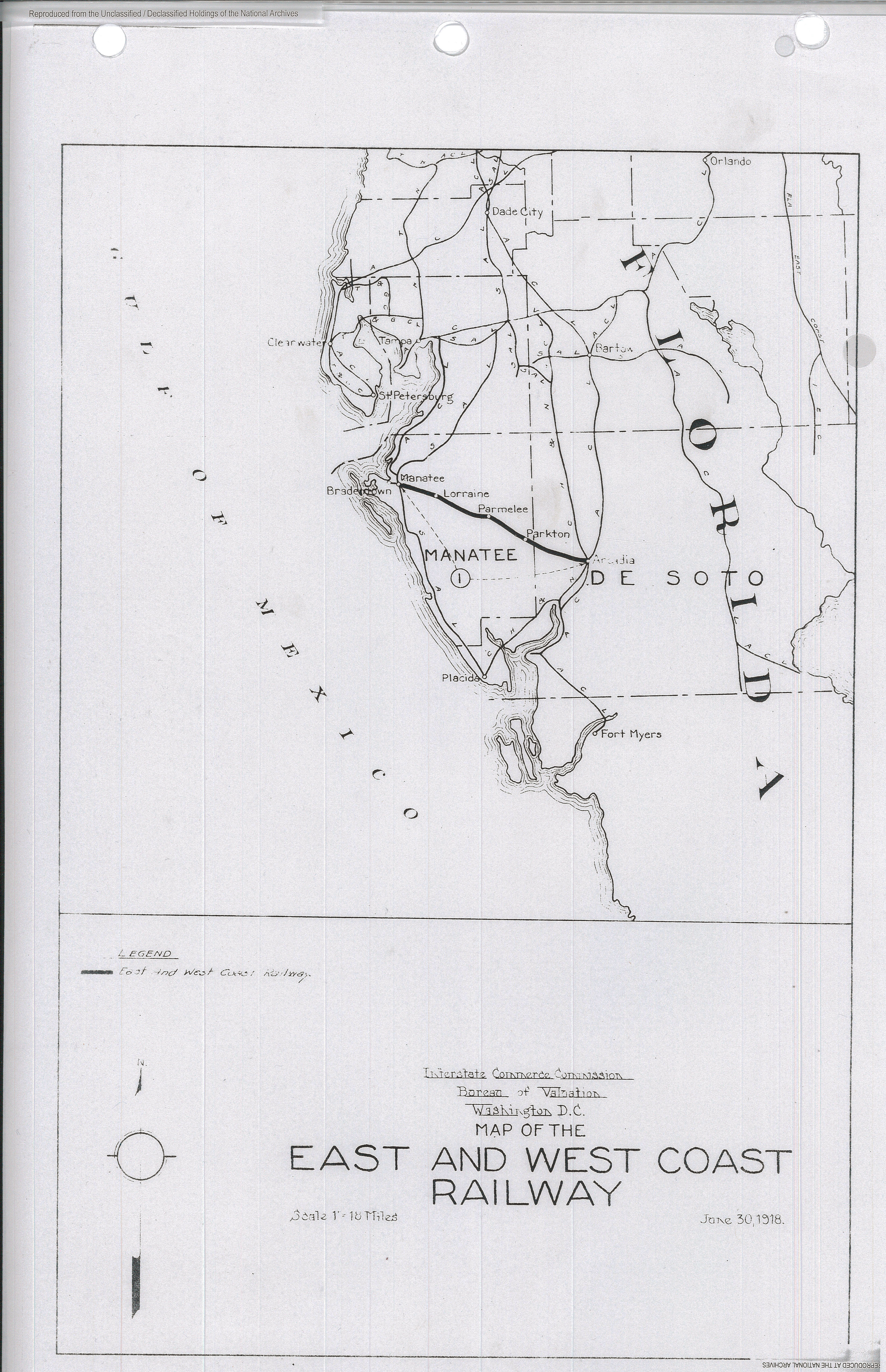
1918 maps of the railroad

The East and West Coast Railway was a railroad line running from Bradenton on the west coast of Florida southeast to Arcadia in the Peace River valley. Despite its name, the line never went all the way to the east coast of Florida. The line was often used to transport mail, lumber, grain and other commodities.

Opened on May 3, 1915, the nearly fifty mile line began at the Seaboard Air Line Railroad's line through Bradenton just south of the Manatee River, and ran southeast closely following the current route of State Road 70 via Myakka City to Arcadia. In Arcadia, the line crossed the Charlotte Harbor and Northern Railway and the Atlantic Coast Line Railroad's Lakeland–Fort Myers Line before terminating in the southeast portion of Arcadia.

In 1925, the Seaboard Air Line Railroad leased the entire line, who had provided locomotives and rolling stock for the line since its construction. A year later, Seaboard also purchased the Charlotte Harbor and Northern Railway. As a result, Seaboard used the East and West Coast Railway less frequently to the point where the line was completely removed in 1934.

The East and West Coast Railway was one of two railroad lines running from the Bradenton area to the Peace River valley. The other was the southern extension of the Atlantic Coast Line's Tampa Southern Railroad which ran from Sarasota to Southfort (near Fort Ogden) in a parallel trajectory to the East and West Coast Railway.

== Station listing ==
Miles from Bradenton	City/Location	Station	Connections and notes
0.0	Bradenton	Bradentown	located on Seaboard Air Line Railroad Bradenton Spur junction with Tampa Southern Railroad (ACL)
1.0	Bradenton	Bradentown Junction	located on Seaboard Air Line Railroad Sarasota Subdivision
1.3	Bradenton	Manatee	located on Seaboard Air Line Railroad Sarasota Subdivision
1.2	Bradenton	S.A.L. Junction	junction with Seaboard Air Line Railroad Sarasota Subdivision
3.2		East Manatee	
5.1		Alsace	
11.7		Lorraine	
21.4		St. Claire	renamed Verna in 1916
24.5		Parmalee	
28.5		Myakka City	
29.4		East Myakka	
35.2		Parkton	
40.6		Pine Level	
42.4		Tryon	
44.1		Nocatee Junction	
47.0		Belgium	
49.6	Arcadia	C. H. & N. Crossing	junction with Charlotte Harbor and Northern Railway (SAL)
50.3	Arcadia	Arcadia	junction with Atlantic Coast Line Railroad Lakeland–Fort Myers Line
