= Wingate Creek State Park =

State park in Manatee County, Florida

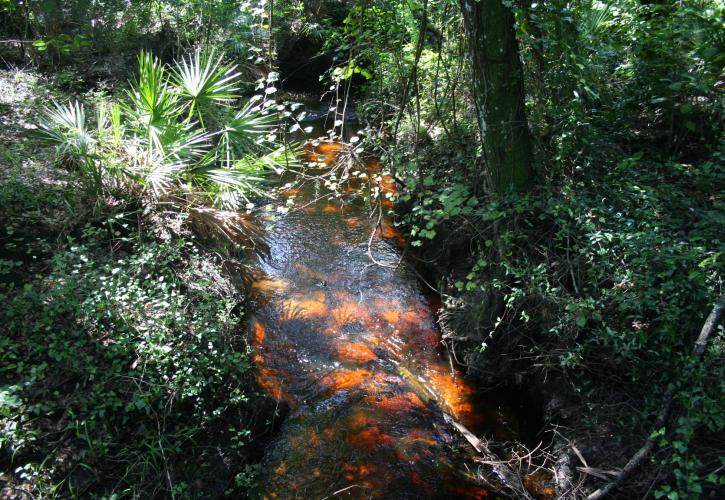
- A view of the Wingate Creek

- Location within Florida Location within the United States
- Interactive map of Wingate Creek State Park
- Location: Manatee County, Florida, United States
- Nearest city: Myakka City
- Coordinates: 27.44662381571223°N 82.14325574918058°W
- Area: 614.57 acres (248.71 ha)
- Established: October 26, 1988; 38 years ago
- Governing body: Florida Department of Environmental Protection
- Website: https://www.floridastateparks.org/parks-and-trails/wingate-creek-state-park

Wingate Creek State Park is a Florida state park in Manatee County, located about 25 miles east of Bradenton near Myakka City off of State Road 64. The 615 acres (249 ha) park is a satellite park of Lake Manatee State Park.

The property was acquired by the Internal Improvement Trust Fund on October 26, 1988, as a donation from the Beker Phosphate Corporation. The donation was a part of a settlement that the corporation, which filed Chapter 11 bankruptcy in 1985 while owing the State of Florida roughly $2.5 million in severance taxes, transferred some of their property of comparable value to the state in exchange for a compromise on their outstanding tax debt. The land was originally designated Beker B and was acquired together with the adjoining Beker A parcel, which is now South Fork State Park. Despite coming from a phosphate mining company, neither parcel was mined at the time of transfer.

The Wingate Creek flows south through the park out to the Myakka River. All of the waters within the park are designated as Outstanding Florida Waters. Natural upland communities found in the park include scrub, scrubby flatwoods, and mesic flatwoods, while baygall and bottomland forest line the creek and its tributaries. Visitors can participate in activities such hiking, bicycling, birding, and nature study, with trails accessible from a single trailhead on State Road 64.

== History ==
=== Archaeology ===
The Florida Master Site File records two archaeological sites within the park. One is a Weeden Island period mound complex covering roughly two acres, and the other is Wingate Creek I, a preceramic campsite.
