= South Fork State Park =

State park in Manatee County, Florida

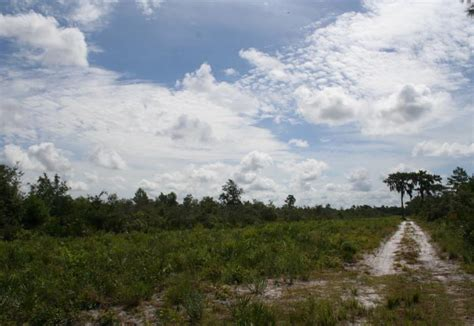
- A view of the park on a sunny day

- Location within Florida Location within the United States
- Interactive map of South Fork State Park
- Location: Manatee County, Florida, United States
- Nearest city: Parrish
- Coordinates: 27.6162°N 82.2515°W
- Area: 455 ha (1,124 acres)
- Established: October 26, 1988; 38 years ago
- Governing body: Florida Department of Environmental Protection
- Website: https://www.floridastateparks.org/parks-and-trails/south-fork-state-park

South Fork State Park is a Florida state park in Manatee County, located about 11 miles east of Parrish along the South Fork of the Little Manatee River. The 1,124 acres (455 ha) park is administered as a satellite of Lake Manatee State Park. This park currently has no developed public access.

== History ==
The property was acquired by the Internal Improvement Trust Fund on October 26, 1988, as a donation from the Beker Phosphate Corporation. The donation was a part of a settlement that the corporation, which filed Chapter 11 bankruptcy in 1985 while owing the State of Florida roughly $2.5 million in severance taxes, transferred some of their property of comparable value to the state in exchange for a compromise on their outstanding tax debt.

The land was originally designated Beker A and was acquired together with the adjoining Beker B parcel, which is now Wingate Creek State Park. Despite coming from a phosphate mining company, neither parcel was mined at the time of transfer.

== Ecology ==
The South Fork of the Little Manatee River flows through the park from southeast to northwest, with elevations ranging from 45 to 125 feet above sea level. Natural upland communities at the park include scrub, scrubby flatwoods, mesic flatwoods, mesic hammock, and small pockets of sandhill, while bottomland forest can be found along the river floodplain. All of the waters within the park boundaries are designated as Outstanding Florida Waters.

Park visitors that manage to visit the park may participate in activities such as hiking, birding, wildlife viewing, nature study, and photography. The Florida Park Service has stated that a developed public entrance is in progress.
