= Manatee County Public Library =

Public library in Manatee County, Florida (US)

Coordinates: 27.495644°N 82.573172°W

- Type: Public library
- Established: 1918
- Branch of: Manatee County Community and Veterans Services Department
- Branches: 7

The Manatee County Public Library is a public library that provides services and resources to the communities and visitors of Manatee County. It is a division of the Manatee County Government's Community and Veterans Services Department located in Manatee County, Florida. The library system provides patrons with in-person resources such as books, movies, and music, as well as online databases to access e-books, e-audiobooks, journal articles, magazines, and other resources. Library services include free events for the public, one-on-one learning sessions, and computers and other technological equipment available for public use. Library cards are provided at no charge to those who reside, own property, attend school, or work in Manatee County.

== Branches ==
- Braden River Branch, Bradenton
- Central Library, Bradenton
- Island Branch, Holmes Beach
- Lakewood Ranch Library, Lakewood Ranch
- Palmetto Branch, Palmetto
- Rocky Bluff Branch, Ellenton
- South Manatee Branch, Bradenton

== History ==
In 1898, Julia Fuller carried book rentals in her store, which later moved to American Sudbury's store. A library committee was formed in 1904 by the Village Improvement Association. Dr. J.C. Pelot donated a lot at 12th St. West and Avenue West for the library to be built on. In 1904, T. J. Bachman loaned $500 to aid in the construction of a small library.

In 1914, $10,000 was given by the Carnegie Foundation to establish the first library in the area, Palmetto Carnegie Library.

In 1918 the County Library System was established with the opening of the Bradenton Carnegie Library, where the first bookmobile was started in 1956. That same year, some additions were added to the Bradenton Carnegie Library, increasing the overall square footage by one third.

In 1963, a plan was approved for a countywide system which allowed the cities of Bradenton and Palmetto to join with Manatee County. From 1966 to 1969, the South Manatee Branch Library and the Island Branch Library were built. In the early 1970s, the idea of a large central library was proposed by the county. On April 24, 1978, the Central Library was opened to county citizens.

In 1990, the library system decided to use the Online Computer Library Center (OCLC) to catalog books and other items. OCLC has become a vital part of the information infrastructure that supports research, scholarship, and learning around the world.

In 1992, a text-only computer was added to the libraries that was connected to the Bradenton Herald newspaper and had access to the index software. Two years later, one public computer was added for the use of word processing and educational software. In 1996, the first online catalog computers were added for the staff, which replaced the old large wooden card catalogs. Soon after, a few were added for patrons to use.

In 2000, the Central Library gained twelve Windows-based PCs in the second-floor computer lab, thanks to a grant from the Bill and Melinda Gates Foundation. In 2001, bookmobiles were updated, but their services ended in 2010.

Throughout the 2010s, other technology was brought to the library, such as iPads, PCs, laptops, e-readers, and Wifi systems to enhance patrons' experience.

Beginning November 16, 2020, Manatee County Public Libraries went fine free.

From July 1st-31st in 2021, the Manatee County Public Library System held a library card design contest where library staff chose winners from original artwork entries created by Manatee county residents. There were three age group divisions consisting of youths (up to the age of ten), teens (eleven through seventeen years old), and adults (eighteen and up). The winners of each division were Dagney Tang, Madeline Thompson, and Catalina Montalvo.

On January 12th, 2024, the Lakewood Ranch Library opened and was added as the seventh branch of Manatee County's libraries. This facility is the county's first library built in the 21st century and cost $17.6 million. It is 25,000 square feet with two stories and has Manatee County's first library drive-thru window.

== Eaton Room ==
The Eaton Room is a collection of local and state historic materials housed in the Manatee Library System's Central Branch. Originally created following the death of local philanthropist Elizabeth M. Eaton in 1973, the collection includes materials gathered from County libraries, as well as Eaton's own antiquarian Florida purchases. Yearbooks from local schools, telephone books, city directories, oral interviews, and archival negatives from the Manatee County Historical Society were later added. The collection has been expanded to include local maps, local newspapers and magazines, hundreds of books on local history, government documents, and census data. In 2023, The Archive Lab located in the Eaton Room became available to use.

== Historical Digital Collection ==
In 1965, the Manatee County Historical Society began collecting and copying photos from local Manatee County families. The Society turned over 6,259 images to the Manatee County Public Library System in 1977, and the library system continued to collect images from community members within its Eaton Room. In 2003, 32,300 archival negatives were sent to the University of South Florida Tampa Library for digitization. These images were then added to what is now the Manatee County Public Library Historical Image Digital Collection, an online resource where visitors can browse and download images at no charge. The collection includes images of people, activities, and buildings in Manatee County.

== Awards ==
- 2021: Foundations & Boards Outstanding Program Award - Florida Library Association for Friends of the Rocky Bluff Library's Storytelling Festival
- 2021: Foundations & Boards Outstanding Member Award - Florida Library Association for Friends of the Central Library treasurer and bookstore manager Judy Wetter.
- 2018: Innovation Award - Florida Library Association in recognition of 805 Lit + Art Journal, the first literary and art journal published by a library.
- 2018: Libraries Mean Business - Florida Library Association for Information Services' beneficial service to local businesses and job seekers
- 2017: Librarian of the Year (Florida Library Association) - Ava Ehde, Library Services Manager
- 2017: Friends, Foundation & Board Award (Florida Library Association) - Friends of the Rocky Bluff Library's Biannual Newsletter
- 2016: Library of the Year - Florida Library Association, in recognition of the Manatee County Public Library System for the outstanding service it provides to the community
