= Tallevast, Florida =

Unincorporated community in Florida, U.S.

Coordinates: 27°24′06″N 82°32′34″W

Tallevast is an unincorporated community in Manatee County, Florida, United States. It is part of the Bradenton–Sarasota–Venice Metropolitan Statistical Area. The ZIP Code for Tallevast is 34270.

== History ==
The land that now makes up the Tallevast area was originally owned by two brothers, J. H. and J.L. Tallevast of South Carolina. The Tallevast family moved to Manatee County in 1900. They settled in a home on Bowlees Creek in what is today known as Whitfield Estates. The Tallevast neighborhood began as a labor-camp for the Tallevast family's turpentine business.

A post office called Tallevast has been in operation since 1919.

A historically African American neighborhood, Tallevast has for many decades been left underdeveloped and underfunded. In the 1940s, telephone service was extended to the community. In the early 1980s, a $1 million federal Community Block grant was secured to finally extend sewer and water into the community and pave the dirt and grass roads. An Amazon distribution center opened along Tallevast Road in October 2021. In recent years there has been more development in the area.

Tallevast was home to the American Beryllium Company plant, which built parts for nuclear warheads for the federal government. In 1996, the plant was purchased by Lockheed Martin and shut down. Lockheed Martin officials determined that the site was causing water and soil pollution, which was reported to state officials in 2000. It was determined that for several decades runoff from the American Beryllium Co. plant had been contaminating the groundwater in the Tallevast community. It was not until 2004 that residents, many of whom rely solely on well water, were informed of the issue. In 2009, Lockheed Martin pledged to clean up the pollutants from the area, a plan which is expected to take up to 50 years. The plant would be dismantled in its entirety in 2011.
