= Palm View, Florida =

- Unincorporated community
- Location within Florida Location within the United States
- Coordinates: 27°34′07″N 82°33′25″W
- Country: United States
- State: Florida
- County: Manatee
- Elevation: 13 ft (4.0 m)
- Time zone: UTC−05:00 (EST)
  - Summer (DST): UTC−04:00 (EDT)
- Area code: 941
- FIPS code: 12-54550
- GNIS feature ID: 288415

Palm View is an unincorporated area in Manatee County, Florida, United States. The area is located north of the Manatee River.

== History ==
Palm View began in the 1800s as a fishing and agricultural community. The first church there was built in 1885 as a Seventh-Day Adventist church. This building was destroyed by fire in 1927. The Church of Nazarene was later rebuilt and by the 1940s, it had a new pastor and became Palm View Bible Church, and as of 2021, Palm View First Baptist Church.

Over the years, local families such as the Gilletts, Smiths, and Bishops buried their family members there, later calling it Palm View Cemetery. A log cabin schoolhouse was built in 1885 and educated 10 children through the eighth grade. In 1918, a wooden building replaced that structure, followed by a new school building in 1926 at a cost of about $20,000, next door to the cemetery. By the 1940s, the school needed more space, also citing poor lighting, and a lack of windows, with new classroom wings added in 1956. In 1949, the school had three teachers and a teacher-principal, Mrs. Editha Smoak. The school had an auditorium that could seat up to 250, which made it a popular place for community events. In 1993-94 a new building was constructed, and the original 1926 building was preserved at the behest of Manatee Historical Society as part of the school complex, and currently serves as the school's media center.
