= Fort Hamer Bridge =

Bridge over Manatee River, Florida, United States

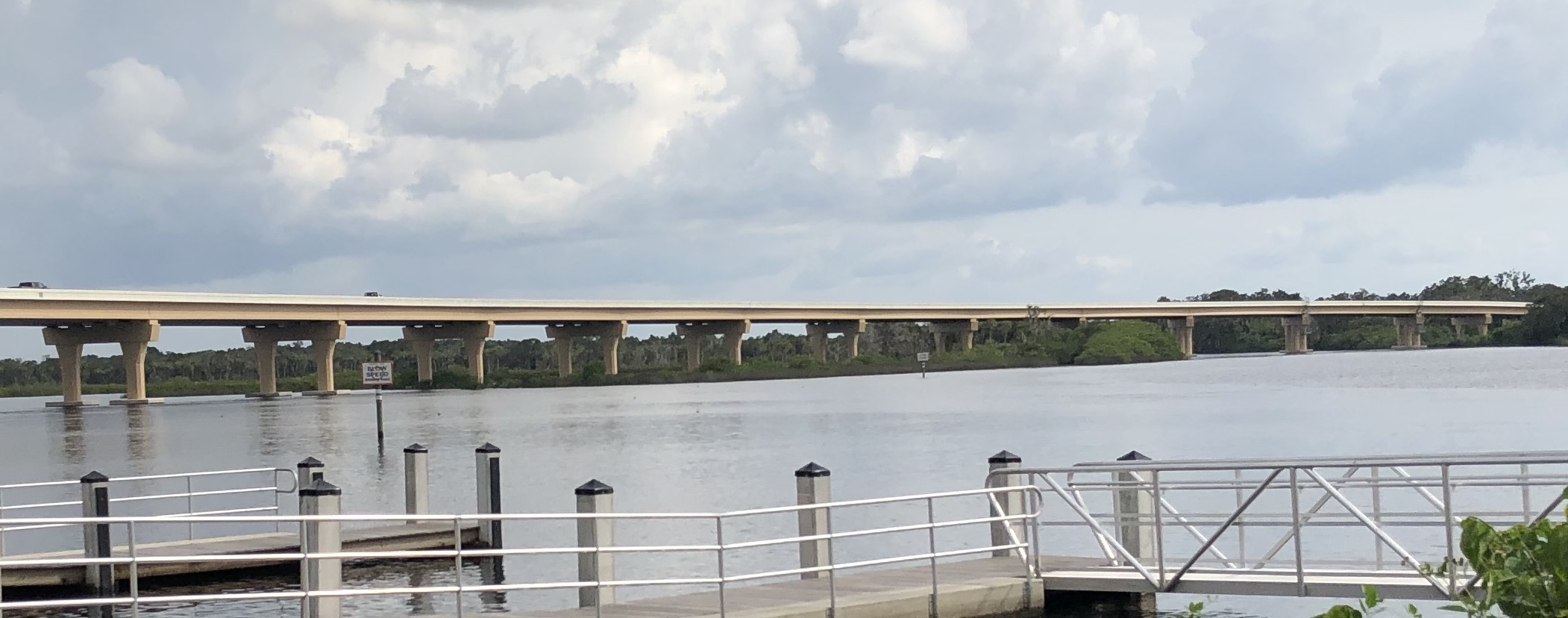
- The Fort Hamer Bridge in 2018.
- Coordinates: 27°31′15″N 82°25′42″W
- Carries: 2 lanes of Fort Hamer Road, pedestrians, and bicycles
- Crosses: Manatee River
- Locale: Parrish, Florida
- Official name: Fort Hamer Bridge
- Named for: Fort Hamer
- Owner: Manatee County
- Maintained by: Manatee County
- ID number: 134123
- Website: forthamerbridge.com

Characteristics
- Design: Box girder
- Material: Steel, concrete
- Total length: 2,318 ft (707 m)
- Height: 32 ft (10 m)
- Longest span: 144 ft (44 m)
- No. of spans: 18
- No. of lanes: 2

History
- Engineering design by: AECOM (initially URS before acquisition)
- Constructed by: Johnson Brothers Corporation
- Construction start: March 19, 2015
- Construction end: August 2017
- Construction cost: $23.5 million
- Opened: October 18, 2017; 8 years ago
- Inaugurated: October 18, 2017

Statistics
- Daily traffic: 15,900 (2017)
- Toll: None

Location
- Interactive map of Fort Hamer Bridge

Fort Hamer Bridge is a bridge that spans the Manatee River between Lakewood Ranch and Parrish. It was built in 2015 and completed in 2017 by Johnson Brothers Corporation and was designed by AECOM (initially as URS before acquisition). The name of the bridge comes from the former fort of the same name that resided nearby the bridge during the Seminole Wars.

== History ==
A bridge over Manatee River was first proposed by the Manatee County Board of Commissioners on September 9, 1909. The county proposed a $250,000 road bond, equivalent to $6,224,000 in 2024, to pay for construction of the bridge. This proposal was abandoned due to opposition and lack of funds. It was proposed again by the County Commission in 1989 and added in the initial adoption of the County's Comprehensive Plan on May 11, 1989.

Construction of the bridge broke ground on March 19, 2015. The bridge opened to vehicular traffic on October 18, 2017 after it was temporarily open a month prior as an evacuation route for Hurricane Irma.

== Accolades ==
The bridge was ranked No. 7 on Roads & Bridges Top 10 Bridges for 2017. The list compromises of bridges in North America and rates bridges based on project challenges, impact to the region, and scope of work.

The project was also awarded "Highway/Bridge Best Project" in ENR as part of ENR Southeast's 2018 Best Projects.
