= Elwood Park =

Elwood Park may refer to

- Ellwood Park, Baltimore
- Elwood Park, Florida
- Elwood Park in Elwood, New York

== See also ==
- Elmwood Park, Illinois
- Elmwood Park, Wisconsin
