= Rattlesnake Key =

Rattlesnake Key may refer to:

- Rattlesnake Key (Tampa Bay), a key in Tampa Bay, Manatee County, Florida
- Long Key, an island in the middle Florida Keys called Cayo Vivora (Rattlesnake Key) by early Spanish explorers, a reference to the shape of the island which resembles a snake with its jaws open
- Rattlesnake Key, a fictional island on the Florida Gulf Coast in the 2024 Stephen King novella Rattlesnakes
