= Gillette, Florida =

Unincorporated community in Florida, U.S.

Coordinates: 27°36′04″N 82°31′37″W

Gillette is an unincorporated area and small community in Manatee County, Florida, United States.

== History ==
Gillette was originally known as Frog Creek. The town was settled before the Civil War by people from Northern Florida, Georgia and Alabama. Its main founder was Daniel Gillett, who raised cattle and grew citrus there. The town's church started in 1850 and formally organized in 1868. This church was the first Baptist church in Manatee County and north of the Manatee River. In 1895 to 1910 the town had a post office. In 1925 the town opened a schoolhouse (closed in 1948). The town has always been in the Citrus and Cattle industry.
