= Fort Hamer, Florida =

- Unincorporated community
- Fort Hamer
- Location within Manatee County, Florida
- Coordinates: 27°31′31″N 82°25′48″W
- Country: United States
- State: Florida
- County: Manatee
- Established: November 28, 1849
- Elevation: 7 ft (2.1 m)
- Time zone: UTC-5 (EST)
  - Summer (DST): UTC-4 (EDT)
- Area code: 941
- FIPS code: 12-23895
- GNIS feature ID: 295293

Fort Hamer is an unincorporated area in Manatee County, Florida, United States, and was the name of a short-lived U.S. Army fort in eastern Manatee County. Although the area is named for Fort Hamer, the former military installation has never been precisely located through historical or archaeological research.

== History ==
The Second Seminole War ended in 1842, and the U. S. Congress passed the Armed Occupation Act, which allowed settlers to homestead in the Florida Territory. Soon settlers began pushing closer to the last Seminole and Miccosukee remnant bands located in the central and southern parts of the state ignoring the terms forced on them by the Treaty of Payne's Landing of 1832 to enforce the Indian Removal Act of 1830.

During the summer of 1849, a small group of warriors from the band of Echo Emathla Chopco (Chipco), a Talisi-Creek (see also Red Sticks) chief, started to attack various pioneer outposts throughout Florida. While this band was allied with the Seminoles and Miccosukees, the rogue-men had been previously outlawed by the tribal leaders Holata Micco (Billy Bowlegs) and Abiaka (Sam Jones), and were forced to remove themselves.

The first outpost to be attacked during this period, called “The Crisis of 1849,” was at the Indian River settlement north of Fort Pierce, on the east coast of Florida. Next, traveling inland, the men attacked the trading post of Kennedy and Darling at Paynes Creek near the Peace River.

Secretary of War George W. Crawford sent Major General David E. Twiggs to Fort Brooke on Tampa Bay. Meanwhile, Billy Bowlegs and Sam Jones had initiated peace overtures to U.S. Army Captain John C. Casey, the Indian agent in Florida. While the men who committed the attacks were caught and surrendered to Twiggs, by tribal leaders the damage had already been done.

Fort Hamer was established in November 1849, as part of an order by Twiggs to establish a 200-mile-span (320 km) of forts from the Manatee River to the Indian River. Named after Thomas L. Hamer, the fort consisted of several log buildings including a hospital, commissary, hay barn and accommodations for around 165 soldiers at its inception.

General Twiggs by the end of November 1849 had completed or reopened Fort Hamer, Fort Crawford (between Ft. Hamer and Ft. Myakka), Fort Myakka (near present Myakka Head), Fort Meade, Fort Fraser, Fort Gardiner, Fort Gatlin, Fort Basinger, Fort Vinton, Fort Pierce, and Fort Dallas on Biscayne Bay.

However, the stretch of forts constructed under General Twiggs's command were abandoned only a year after opening.

In 1856, during the Third Seminole War, Fort Hamer was once again used in service. A detachment of 10 men in Captain William B. Hooker's Company from the Florida Mounted Volunteers were stationed there. On Feb. 26, 1876, the War Department formally turned over the Fort Hamer property to the Department of the Interior.

By 1895, none of the fort remained. The area was described as a sandy bank on the Manatee River that was a popular location for boating and day-trips.
