= Lorraine, Florida =

- Unincorporated area
- Lorraine
- Location within Manatee County, Florida
- Coordinates: 27°25′55″N 82°23′43″W
- Country: United States
- State: Florida
- County: Manatee
- Elevation: 39 ft (12 m)
- Time zone: UTC−05:00 (EST)
  - Summer (DST): UTC−04:00 (EDT)
- Zip code: 34202, 34211
- Area code: 941
- FIPS code: 12-41310
- GNIS feature ID: 294840

Lorraine is an unincorporated area located in Manatee County, Florida.

== History ==
The small company town of Lorraine was established by the Lorraine Turpentine Company. Both were created in 1915 by Tampa financier G.A. McLeod. The company became a public corporation in 1916. Both company and town were likely named after the region of Lorraine in France, which dominated national news during this time. A nearby community where the Lorraine Turpentine Company also operated is similarly named Alsace. In addition to being home to a turpentine mill, Lorraine was also the location of a saw mill owned by Schroeder Mill & Timber Company.

By the mid-1920s, the turpentine industry in the area began drying up and The Lorraine Turpentine Company lost the land in a government seizure due to their indebtedness. A significant area of Lorraine remained in the ownership of Schroeder Mill & Timber Company. In 1926, Lorraine Farms, a community of multi-acre farmable plots was platted at Lorraine.

Since the 1990s, Lorraine has been considered part of greater Lakewood Ranch, a planned community located on former Shroeder-Manatee Ranch land.
