= Waterbury, Florida =

Waterbury
- Location within Manatee County, Florida
- Coordinates: 27°26′44″N 82°18′11″W
- Country: United States
- State: Florida
- Counties: Manatee
- Elevation: 79 ft (24 m)
- Time zone: UTC−05 (EST)
  - Summer (DST): UTC−04 (EDT)
- Area codes: 941
- FIPS code: 12-75270
- GNIS feature ID: 294967

Waterbury is an unincorporated area in Manatee County, Florida, United States.

== History ==
Waterbury was a planned company town by the James L. Waterbury Company of Chicago and Minneapolis located within a large citrus development in eastern Manatee County.

The development was first proposed in 1914 by James L. Waterbury, a recent transplant to Bradenton. The Waterbury property was originally six square miles just south of the Manatee River, half to the north and half to the south of the intersecting East and West Coast Railroad (today location of State Road 70). The project required over 10,000 acres in the Manatee River valley to be drained. The southern half of the development was to be a town known as Pomelo Park and the northern half was to be the town of Waterbury.

In 1918, the beginnings of the grapefruit farm were planted. The town of Waterbury was platted in 1920. It was intended to have 192 building sites over one square mile located in the heart of the grapefruit trees. The Waterbury project gained notoriety locally because the company used dynamite to clear the many pine trees on the land, which was a novel process for its time.

By 1922, 650 acres of trees had been planted. A lodge and administrative office for the grapefruit operation had also been built. In 1923, James Waterbury sold his company to Rudolph Haas of Springfield. At that time, the Waterbury grapefruit development was home to over 700 acres of groves, as well as office buildings, laborer housing, stables, and packing houses.

The recession that hit Florida in 1926 severely damaged the citrus industry and the Waterbury Grapefruit Company went out of business. In the 1930s, the property was acquired by the State of Florida as part of the Murphy Act.

In 1967, the Hunsader family of Wisconsin purchased the land that was platted for the proposed town of Waterbury and developed a tomato farm there. Today the planned site for the town is still part of the Hunsader Farms property, but no original buildings remain. Today the original Waterbury Grapefruit grove tracts are home to agricultural businesses and rural residences.
