= Elwood Park, Florida =

Unincorporated area in Florida, U.S.

Coordinates: 27°28′09″N 82°30′21″W

Elwood Park is an unincorporated area in Manatee County, Florida, United States.

== History ==
Elwood Park is a neighborhood located at what was a 1500-acre farming community near Oneco on the Braden River. The area was named for J. Elwood Moore, a Sarasota banker and developer of the area who established the New Home Development Company in the mid-1910s. The New Home Development Company advertised the agricultural tracts in the Midwest to Northerners willing to cultivate the land and Moore provided the training and supplies needed. By 1918, several farms had been established at the site and a shell road was laid to connect Elwood Park to the nearest town of Manatee. By 1921, the Elwood Park settlement was home to 50 people. In 1923, Carl Haselton purchased the property from Elwood Moore with plans to expand the agricultural tracts available there as well as develop a large subdivision known as Elwood Park Manor. A new schoolhouse and sawmill were built by Haselton to attract residents. However, the development of the neighborhood, which included plans for an amusement park and lavish amenities, was hampered by the Florida real estate bust in 1927.

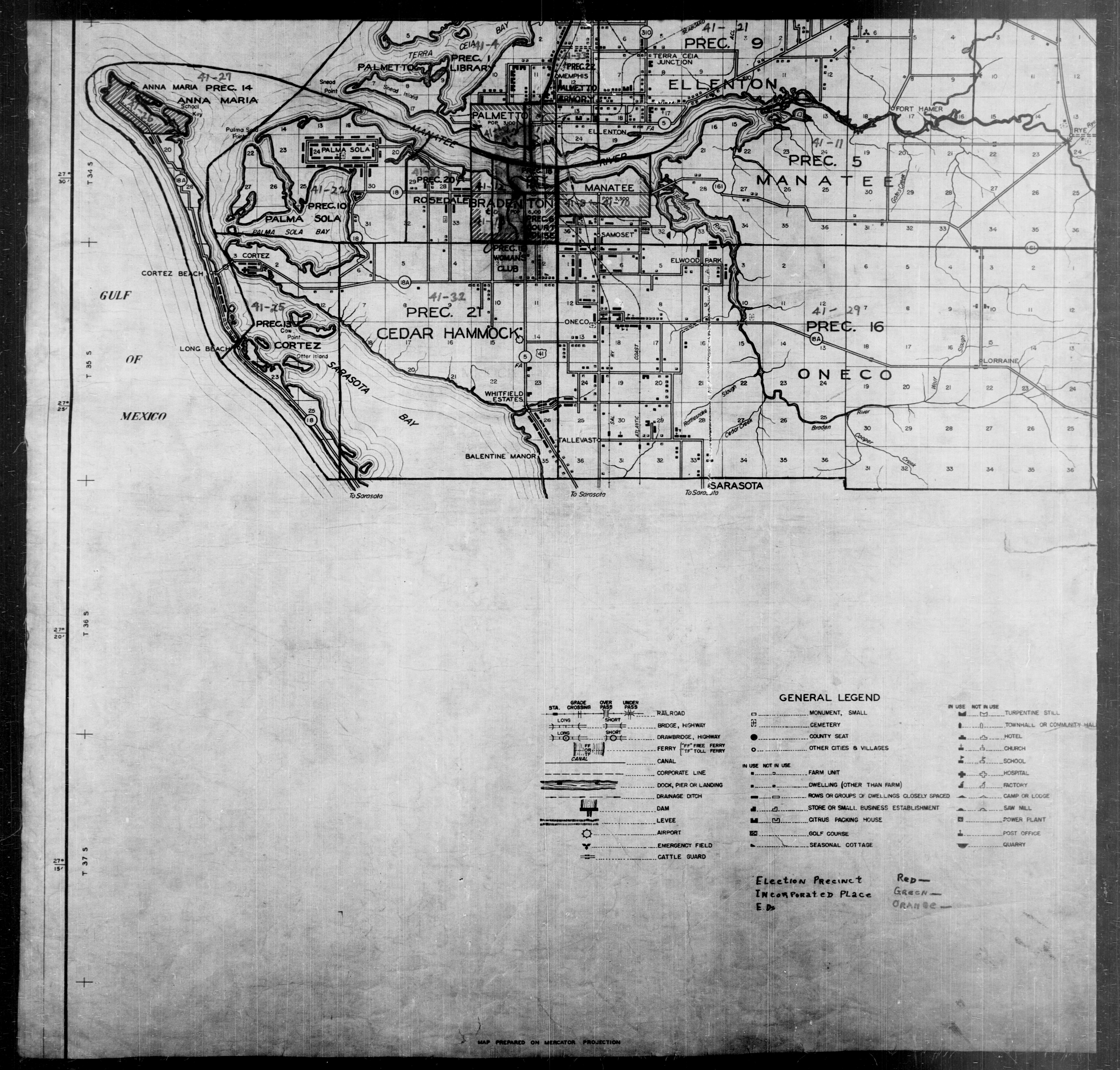
A 1940 US Census enumeration district map of Manatee County showing the location of Elwood Park

Although still largely rural and home to a few smaller farms and plant nurseries, Elwood Park had experienced independent residential development since the 1950s, but the former subdivision plans were never brought to fruition.
