= Ward Lake (Florida) =

Lake in Florida, United States

- Bill Evers Reservoir
- Location within Florida Location within the United States
- Coordinates: 27°25′54.48″N 82°29′8.16″W
- Type: Reservoir
- Primary inflows: Braden River
- Primary outflows: Braden River
- Basin countries: United States
- Surface area: 255 acres (103 ha)
- Settlements: Bradenton

Ward Lake, also known as Bill Evers Reservoir, is a 255-acre body of water in Manatee County, Florida, in the United States. It provides most of the water for the city of Bradenton and is a water feature in the Manatee River watershed.

== Overview ==
Its inflow and outflow is the Braden River. The lake has had problems with nutrient loading and elevated concentrations of dissolved copper. Ward Lake /Bill Evers Reservoir was built in the late 1930s and expanded in 1985.

== See also ==
- Upper Manatee River Canoe Trail
