= Terra Ceia, Florida =

- Unincorporated community
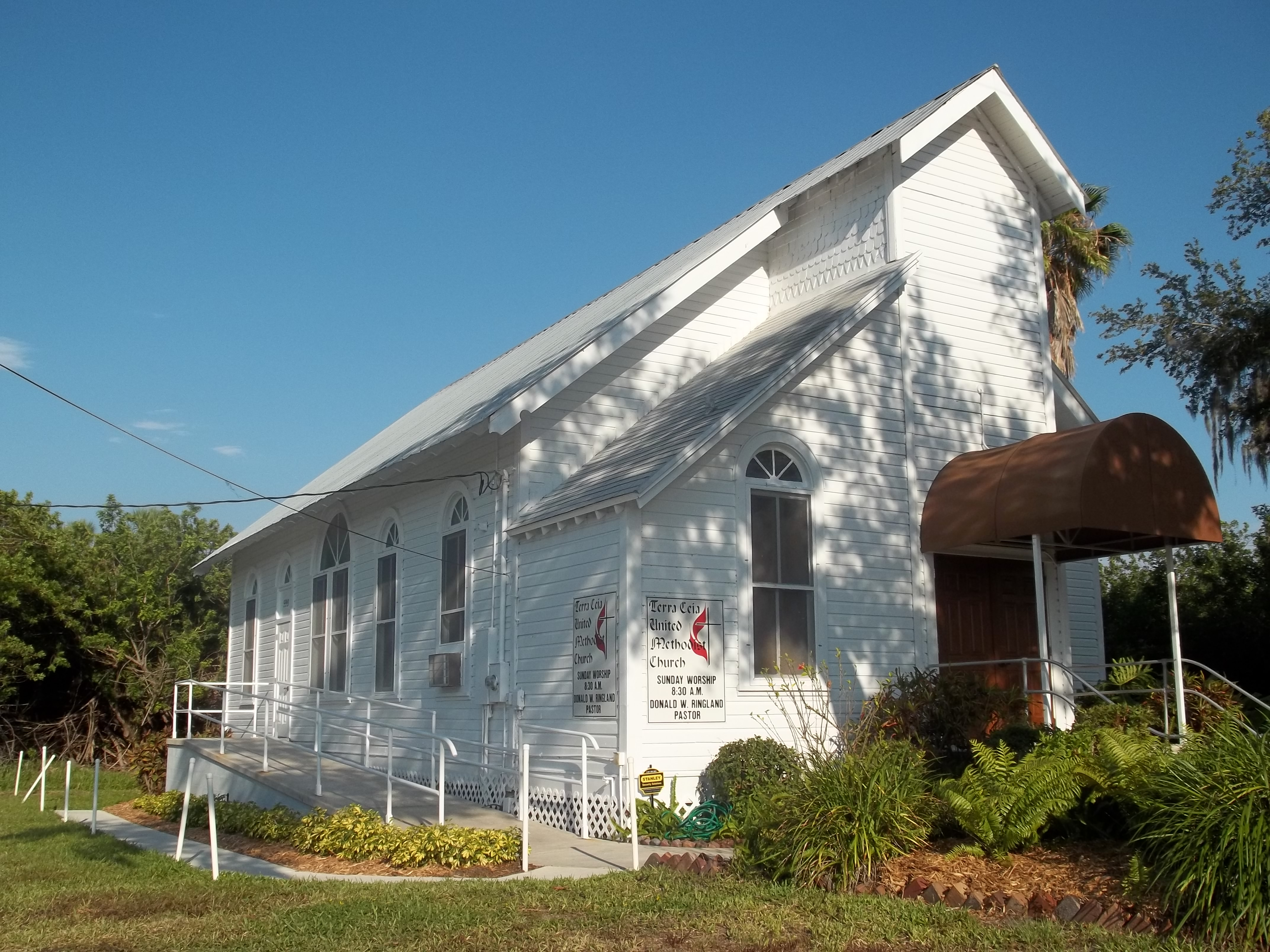
- United Methodist Church in Terra Ceia

- Location within Manatee County
- Coordinates: 27°34′45″N 82°34′50″W
- Country: United States
- State: Florida
- County: Manatee
- Elevation: 3 ft (0.91 m)
- Time zone: UTC-5 (Eastern (EST))
  - Summer (DST): UTC-4 (EDT)
- ZIP Code: 34250 (originally 33591)
- Area code: 941
- FIPS code: 12-71550
- GNIS feature ID: 292127

Terra Ceia is an unincorporated community in Manatee County, Florida, United States that includes the 1,932 acres (7.82 km^{2}) Terra Ceia Preserve. It is located on Terra Ceia Island near the Southern shore of Tampa Bay near the intersection of US 19 and I-275, at the southern end of the Sunshine Skyway Bridge. It is surrounded by Tampa Bay to the north and west, Rubonia to the east, and Terra Ceia Bay to the south.

== Geography ==
The community is part of the Bradenton–Sarasota–Venice Metropolitan Statistical Area. The 1,932-acre (7.82 km^{2}) Terra Ceia Preserve is also located in the area and protected by the Southwest Florida Water Management District and Florida Department of Environmental Protection. It offers fishing and hiking.

== History ==
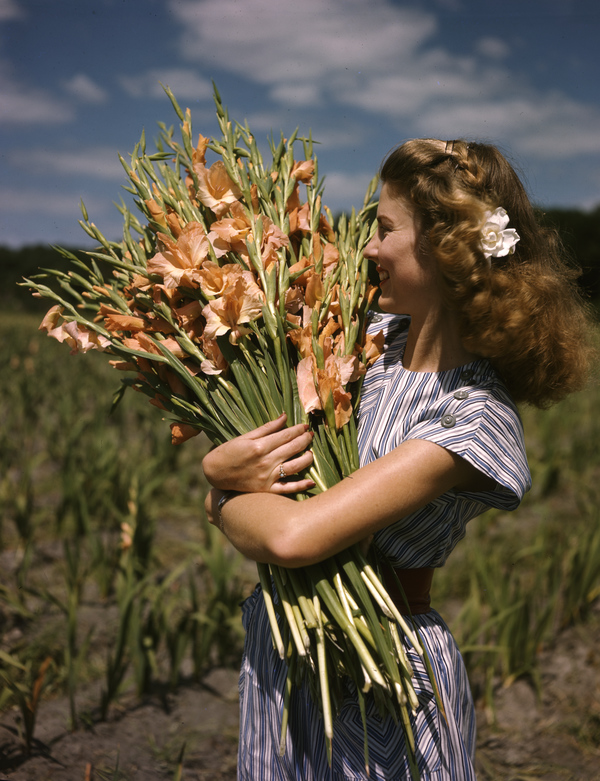
A woman holding flowers at a farm on Terra Ceia Island, 1947

=== Early Inhabitants and Origins of Name ===
The first known inhabitants of Terra Ceia were the Timucuan Indians. These people lived quietly on the western shore of Terra Ceia. Proof of their existence can be seen in the shell mounds that dot the area. In 1539, Hernando De Soto and his men established a camp at the Indian mounds of Terra Ceia and rested there for six weeks before continuing their exploration of the southeastern United States.

By the late 1700s, Terra Ceia became a temporary home to Cuban and Spanish fishermen who set up temporary camps and homes during their seasonal fishing expeditions. Records show that Spanish cartographers labeled the island Terra Ceia. One version of the origin story of the name says that this meant ‘Land of Rosia,’ a reference to Ranchero de Rosie, a Cuban fishing rancho located there at the time. Cuban fishermen utilized the ranchero to meet with native people for trading and to catch and prepare fish for shipment to Cuba. An alternative name explanation in the 1930s is that Terra Ceia is a misinterpretation of ‘terra cielo’ meaning heavenly land. A subsequent 1970 explanation stated that Terra Ceia is a possible misspelling of ‘terra ceja’ which would translate to ‘land’s summit.’

=== 19th Century Settlers ===
In 1843, Joseph and Julia Atzeroth became the first permanent settlers on the island. Originally from Bavaria, Germany, the Atzeroth family came to Terra Ceia seeking a warm, southern climate that would improve Julia's liver disease. The Atzeroths built a small cabin on the north shore of Terra Ceia Bay and applied for 160 acres of land under the federal government's Armed Occupation Act of 1842. Other families began homesteading on Terra Ceia shortly after. A post office would open in Terra Ceia on February 11, 1891. By 1897, 127 households resided in Terra Ceia, most of them growing citrus, vegetables (celery in particular) and flowers.

=== 20th Century ===
During World War I 45 residents of the town would serve in the military. Of those who served: 23 were in the Army, 17 in the Navy, 3 in the Coast Guard and two in other branches. One resident would notably serve as an early aviator in the US military.

==== Interwar Era ====
In 1926, a storm surge washed over the island and made it hard to grow crops there. The Seaboard Airline railroad soon no longer provided service and the rail line and the depot was abandoned. The Great Depression caused the Bank of Terra Ceia to fail in 1931. The former bank building currently houses a post office, which has been operating since 1891.
