= Ellenton, Florida =

- Census-designated place
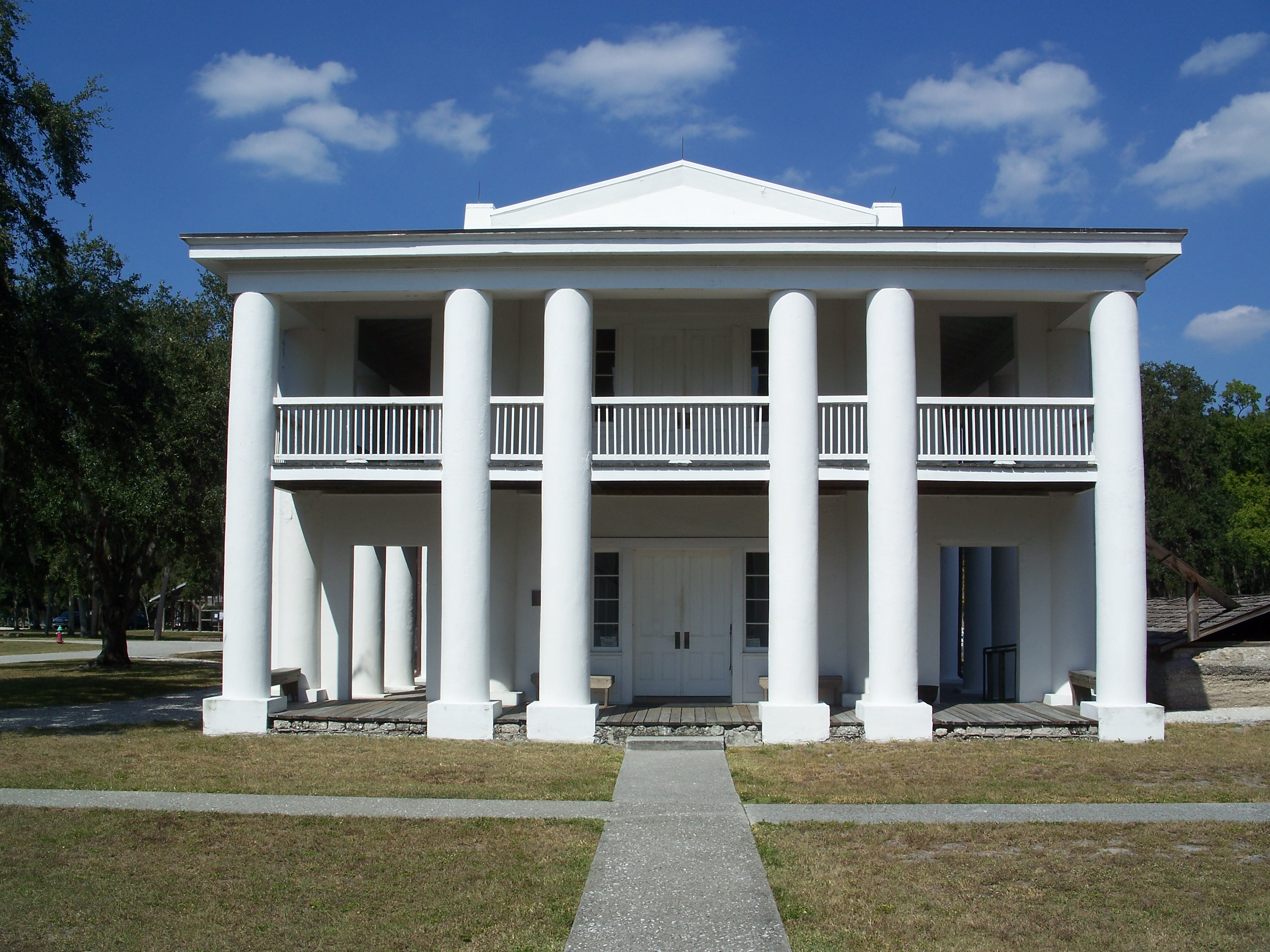
- Gamble Plantation Mansion

- Location in Manatee County and the state of Florida
- Coordinates: 27°31′37″N 82°31′33″W
- Country: United States
- State: Florida
- County: Manatee

Area
  - Total: 4.47 sq mi (11.57 km^{2})
  - Land: 3.31 sq mi (8.56 km^{2})
  - Water: 1.16 sq mi (3.00 km^{2})
- Elevation: 13 ft (4.0 m)

Population (2020)
  - Total: 4,129
  - Density: 1,248.6/sq mi (482.09/km^{2})
- Time zone: UTC-5 (Eastern (EST))
  - Summer (DST): UTC-4 (EDT)
- ZIP codes: 34222 (Ellenton); 34221 (Palmetto)
- Area code: 941
- FIPS code: 12-20375
- GNIS feature ID: 2402450

Ellenton is an unincorporated community and census-designated place (CDP) in Manatee County, Florida, United States. The population was 4,129 at the 2020 census, down from 4,275 at the 2010 census. It is part of the North Port-Bradenton-Sarasota, Florida Metropolitan Statistical Area.

== History ==
The oldest structure in Ellenton is the Gamble Plantation, which was built between 1845 and 1850 by Major Robert Gamble. Originally a sugar plantation worked by slaves, the antebellum mansion fell into disrepair after the Civil War. Major George Patten and his wife, Mary, purchased the property in 1870 and named the area "Ellenton" after his daughter Ellen. In 1881, the United States government designated Ellenton as an official post office site.

A refining plant for fuller's earth located in Ellenton along the Manatee River opened in 1903. It was owned by the Atlantic Refining Company and had 150+ employees being the biggest refinery the company owned. It burned down once in 1908 and again in 1912. In 1922, it burned down for the final time after which it was permanently closed.

== Geography ==
Ellenton is located in central Manatee County. It is on the north side of the tidal Manatee River and is bordered to the west by the city of Palmetto. Unincorporated Memphis is to the northwest.

U.S. Route 301 passes through the center of the community, and Interstate 75 forms the eastern border, with the highways intersecting at Exit 224 on I-75. US 301 leads west into Palmetto and then south across the Manatee River into Bradenton, the county seat, while to the northeast it leads 8 miles (13 km) to Parrish. I-75 leads north 32 miles (51 km) to the east side of Tampa and south 85 miles (137 km) to Fort Myers.

According to the United States Census Bureau, the Ellenton CDP has a total area of 4.5 square miles (12 km^{2}), of which 3.3 square miles (8.5 km^{2}) are land and 1.2 square miles (3.1 km^{2}), or 25.95%, are water.

== Demographics ==
Historical population
Census	Pop.	Note	%±
1970	1,421		—
1980	1,561		9.9%
1990	2,573		64.8%
2000	3,142		22.1%
2010	4,275		36.1%
2020	4,129		−3.4%

=== 2020 census ===
As of the 2020 census, Ellenton had a population of 4,129. The median age was 45.4 years. 19.8% of residents were under the age of 18 and 26.0% of residents were 65 years of age or older. For every 100 females there were 95.2 males, and for every 100 females age 18 and over there were 88.9 males age 18 and over.

100.0% of residents lived in urban areas, while 0.0% lived in rural areas.

There were 1,731 households in Ellenton, of which 26.2% had children under the age of 18 living in them. Of all households, 46.6% were married-couple households, 17.0% were households with a male householder and no spouse or partner present, and 28.4% were households with a female householder and no spouse or partner present. About 28.9% of all households were made up of individuals and 16.3% had someone living alone who was 65 years of age or older.

There were 2,055 housing units, of which 15.8% were vacant. The homeowner vacancy rate was 1.7% and the rental vacancy rate was 5.5%.

Racial composition as of the 2020 census
Race	Number	Percent
White	2,964	71.8%
Black or African American	335	8.1%
American Indian and Alaska Native	19	0.5%
Asian	67	1.6%
Native Hawaiian and Other Pacific Islander	2	0.0%
Some other race	302	7.3%
Two or more races	440	10.7%
Hispanic or Latino (of any race)	883	21.4%

=== Demographic estimates ===
According to Census Bureau profile estimates, the employment rate was 46.1%, the median household income was $59,723, and 11.2% of the population lived below the poverty threshold.

According to the same estimates, 46.9% of the population 25 years or older had a high school diploma or equivalent, and 10.5% had a bachelor's degree or higher.

20.7% of the population spoke Spanish at home, 0.4% spoke other Indo-European languages, and 0.3% spoke Asian and Pacific Islander languages at home. 9.0% of the population were foreign born persons.

== Industry ==
January 2012 - Feld Entertainment purchased the Palmetto Corporate Center, a former Siemens Corp. complex here and plans to move most of its various operations and its world headquarters there over a five-year period starting with its worldwide production center.

1900 - Fuller's Earth Plant mined clay to be used as bleaching agent and as an absorbent for oil and fat.

1850s to present - Agriculture was an important industry, starting with sugarcane from Gamble Plantation. This was harvested through slave labor up until the Civil War. Vegetable farms and citrus groves are also important industries in Ellenton.

== Notable people ==
- James Ehnes (born 1976), violinist and violist
