= Rubonia, Florida =

- Unincorporated community
- Rubonia
- Location within Manatee County, Florida
- Coordinates: 27°34′44″N 82°33′09″W
- Country: United States
- State: Florida
- County: Manatee
- Elevation: 3 ft (0.91 m)
- Time zone: UTC-5 (EST)
  - Summer (DST): UTC-4 (EDT)
- Area code: 941
- FIPS code: 12-62225
- GNIS feature ID: 290046

Rubonia is an unincorporated community in Manatee County, Florida. It is surrounded by Parrish to the east, Tampa Bay to the north, Terra Ceia the west, and Memphis, FL to the south.

== History ==
The land where Rubonia was laid out was part of an 80-acre plot that Albert Stonelake, a United States Union Army surgeon, purchased in 1868. Stonelake sold the undeveloped land to Marcus DeVoursney in 1881. DeVoursney died in 1904 and his estate sold the land in 1911 to William and Nellie Smith, who platted the area in 1913 with plans to develop it as a neighborhood known as East Terra Ceia. The area was planned as housing for African Americans working in the area as migrant farmers.

Within a few years, Atlantic Coast Line Railroad officials requested that East Terra Ceia's name be changed due to frequent mix-ups between it and adjacent Terra Ceia. William Smith renamed the area based on a list of available names provided by the railroad company. Although unconfirmed, Rube Allyn, Sarasota Sun newspaperman and humorist, claimed to be the source of the name Rubonia. Allyn claimed that his friend, Charles R. Capp, vice-president of the Seaboard Air Line Railroad, selected the name in his honor. This story does not mesh with most tellings of the story, which attribute the name to the other rail company operating at Rubonia, Atlantic Coast, and may just be another example of Allyn's humorous tales.

Although the community was planned as a segregated neighborhood, the 1920 census for Rubonia shows that the neighborhood was racially mixed, with some white families also living in the community. The community has remained small throughout the decades and most residents worked in the agricultural and manufacturing industries.

Rubonia's development suffered due to the construction of U.S. 41 in 1965, which bypassed the small town on the main route between Tampa and Bradenton.

The community gained some attention in 1973 when it served as the filming location of the movie Ride in a Pink Car which starred Glenn Corbett. However, much of that attention was negative, as the themes of the movie and subsequent press blurred with the realities of life in Rubonia. Newspaper coverage described Rubonia as a nearly lawless wild west divided by ethnic lines and a hotbed of crime and violence. This ran counter to the community's history as a diverse neighborhood of resident-owned family homes.

== Rubonia Mardi Gras ==
Rubonia hosts one of the only Mardi Gras parades in the area, known as the Historical Rubonia & Terra Ceria Mardi Gras. The event dates back to 1980 when Luanne Topp (aka Ruby Rubonia) wanted to go to the New Orleans Mardi Gras to celebrate her birthday. She couldn't manage to put the trip together, so to cheer her up, about a dozen friends jumped on a truck and threw their own parade through the town. The event was so popular among community members that it began being held annually and at its peak had an attendance of over 20000 spectators. In 2015, the event was cancelled due to financial troubles but in 2017 it was revived by the D.L. Randall Foundation, who continue to fund and host the event each year.
