= Rattlesnake Key (Tampa Bay) =

Rattlesnake Island in Florida

- Rattlesnake Key Rattlesnake Key (Tampa Bay) (the Caribbean)

Geography
- Location: Manatee County, Florida
- Coordinates: 27.556°N 82.619°W
- Adjacent to: Gulf of Mexico

Administration
- United States
- State: Florida
- County: Manatee

Rattlesnake Key is a key (island) in a part of Tampa Bay in Manatee County, Florida.

SSA Marine proposed a plan in January 2026 for a new cruise port to be built at Rattlesnake Key. The Florida Senate introduced Senate Bill 302 on January 13, 2026 which was amended in the following month to include language that prevents dredging or filling of the submerged lands of the Terra Ceia Aquatic Preserve. The bill was signed into law by Florida Governor Ron DeSantis on March 19, 2026.
