= Bowlees Creek =

Coordinates: 27.4347928°N 82.5440562°W

Bowlees Creek is a 4.8 mile stream. This river is located within watershed(s): Sarasota Bay Watershed. Manatee County, Florida, USA.
