= Lake Manatee =

Lake in Florida, United States

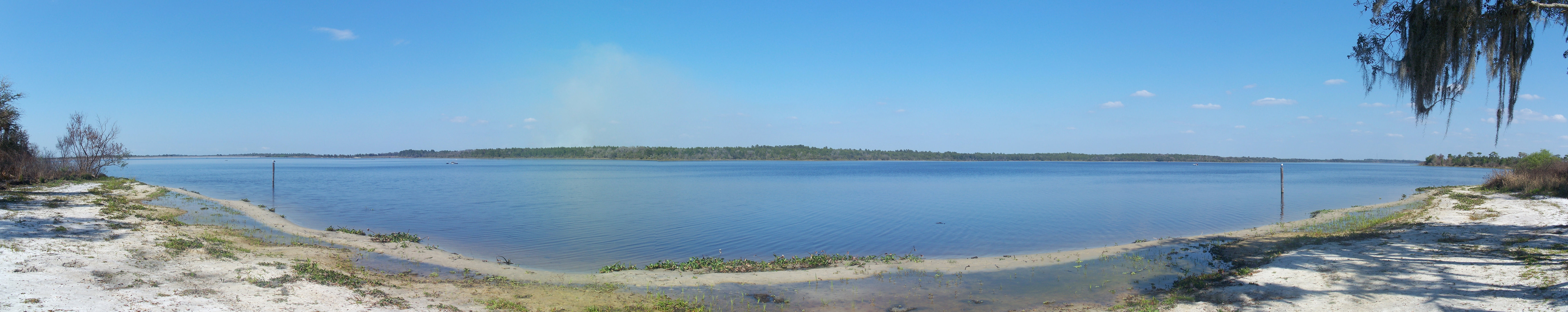

- Location of lake in the state of Florida
- Location: Manatee County, Florida
- Coordinates: 27°29′01″N 82°19′44″W
- Type: Reservoir
- Primary inflows: Manatee River
- Primary outflows: Manatee River
- Catchment area: 120 sq mi (310 km^{2})
- Basin countries: United States
- Built: October 23, 1965
- Surface area: 1,174 acres (4.75 km^{2})
- Max. depth: 11.2 ft (3.4 m)
- Water volume: 5,911 million US gallons (22,380,000 m^{3})
- Surface elevation: 39.1 ft (11.9 m) (2009)

Lake Manatee is an artificial reservoir located in Manatee County, Florida. State Road 64 crosses the eastern end of the lake, while the Lake Manatee State Park is found at the southwestern end. The Manatee River flows into the lake at the eastern end, then continues to the west, where it flows into Tampa Bay. Lake Manatee is a major source of water for Bradenton and other cities in Manatee County, providing 32 million US gallons (120,000,000 L; 27,000,000 imp gal) per day. Lake Manatee State Park is located on the south shore of the lake.

== History ==
Discussion of building a reservoir in Manatee County started in the 1950s. In 1951, the Manatee County Commission passed a resolution indicating interest in building a dam at an existing deep ravine east of the Rye Road bridge. Construction of the Lake Manatee reservoir broke ground on October 23, 1965. The reservoir's dimensions consisted of about 50 feet (15 m) high and 4,510 feet (1,370 m) across, with a 100-foot (30 m) concrete spillway. The dam was completed on January 9, 1967.
