= USS Stonewall (1863) =

Tender of the United States Navy

History

United States
- Acquired: 24 July 1863
- In service: c. February 1863
- Out of service: May 1865
- Captured: by Union Navy forces; c. 24 February 1863
- Fate: Sold, 28 June 1865

General characteristics
- Displacement: 30 tons
- Propulsion: sail
- Sail plan: schooner
- Armament: one heavy 12-pounder howitzer

USS Stonewall was a small 30-ton blockade-running schooner captured by the Union Navy during the Union blockade of the American Civil War.

The Union Navy placed Stonewall in service as a ship’s tender, a role she played during the rest of the war.

== Service history ==
Stonewall was a Southern pilot boat captured by Union screw gunboat USS Tahoma on, or sometime shortly before, 24 February 1863. She was placed in service as a tender to Tahoma pending legal proceedings against her at Key West, Florida. She was condemned there and formally purchased by the Navy from the Key West prize court on 24 July 1863. She operated between Tampa Bay and Charlotte Harbor, Florida, for over one and one-half years, serving as a ship’s tender for the various Union warships assigned in turn to Tampa Bay. The highlight of her career came on 24 January 1864 when she captured Southern sloop Josephine of Tampa, Florida, bound for Havana, Cuba, with seven bales of cotton.

In October 1864, Stonewall was transferred to blockade duty, still as a tender, between St. Marks and Cedar Keys, Florida, and she served in that area through the end of the Civil War. She was inactivated late in May 1865 and was sold at auction at Key West on 28 June 1865 to I. Silvery.

== See also ==
- Blockade runners of the American Civil War
