= Verna, Florida =

Unincorporated community in Florida, United States

Verna
- Location within Manatee County, Florida
- Coordinates: 27°23′14″N 82°16′05″W
- Country: United States
- State: Florida
- Counties: Manatee, Sarasota
- Elevation: 92 ft (28 m)
- Time zone: UTC-5 (EST)
  - Summer (DST): UTC-4 (EDT)
- Area code: 941
- FIPS code: 12-74100
- GNIS feature ID: 294959

Verna is an unincorporated area in Manatee County and Sarasota County, Florida, United States.

== History ==
The town of Verna was a small community from 1915 to 1930 built from a stop located on the East and West Coast Railroad which ran from Bradenton in Manatee County to Arcadia in Desoto County. Today its location is marked by the intersection of what is now State Road 70, Verna Bethany Road, and Verna Road.

The community was established in 1915 on the former Posey Farm and was originally called St. Claire. Early advertisements for the railroad use this name. The name was changed a year later by John Posey, owner of the land and future clerk of the city. He named the community after his daughter, Verna Posey.

In 1915 the land deed for the St. Claire School was approved by the Manatee County School Board and by 1918 Verna School opened under teacher Lois Bond.<news/> Verna's post office was established in February 1916. By 1923 there were 16 homes in Verna. By 1925, there was a garage, post office, hotel, restaurant, train depot, gas station, and a grocery store owned by F.E. Albritton in the town. The Verna Methodist Episcopal Church was erected in 1926.

During the real estate boom of the 1920s, expansion was planned. John Posey and business partner Frank Golden, along with other Bradenton developers such as C.H. Ballard platted new communities adjacent to the town. Subdivisions including Verna Heights, La Verna, and Verna Courts were advertised in newspapers from Tampa to Miami. The decelopment projects did not come to fruition due to a major economic depression which began in Florida in 1926.

In June 1925, the town of Verna was incorporated, but it was not long-lived. In 1927, Florida State Legislature ordered the city to be abolished, which was completed in 1929.

The Verna Post Office closed in January 1930 and the school closed at the end of that spring. The community was unofficially absorbed into the neighboring Myakka City. The area that was once Verna is home to agricultural businesses, small residential neighborhoods, and the Myakka City Fire Department.

Peachey Dairy operated in the area. The Lakewood Ranch Southeast development has been approved near Verna's historic boundary.
