= Terra Ceia Preserve State Park =

State park in Florida, United States

- Frog Creek, Terra Ceia Preserve State Park
- IUCN category IV (habitat/species management area)
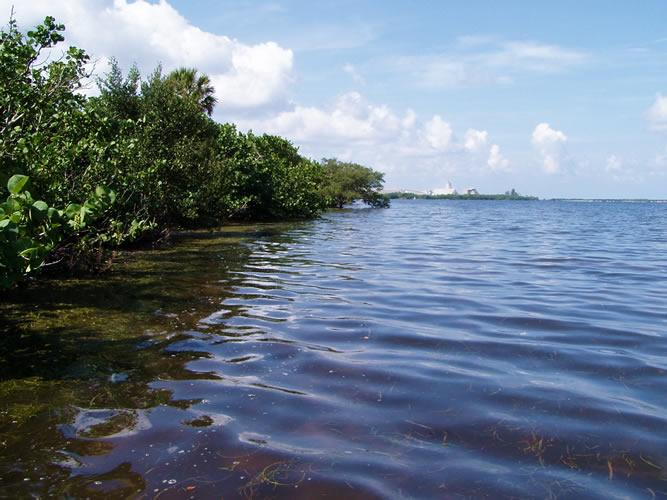
- Terra Ceia Preserve State Park

- Location within Florida
- Interactive map of Terra Ceia Preserve State Park
- Location: Terra Ceia, Florida
- Coordinates: 27.59798222231904°N 82.56204544361735°W
- Area: 1,932 acres (7.82 km^{2})
- Established: 1995
- Governing body: Florida Department of Environmental Protection; Southwest Florida Water Management District
- Website: www.floridastateparks.org/park/terra-ceia

Terra Ceia Preserve State Park (also known as Frog Creek) is a 1,932-acre (7.82 km^{2}) preserve located in Manatee County, Florida north of Palmetto. The preserve is maintained and co-owned by Southwest Florida Water Management District (SFWMD) and Florida Department of Environmental Protection (FDEP).

== Overview ==
The initial portion of the state preserve was acquired in 1995 by SFWMD to protect the water quality of Tampa Bay. In 1998, a joint acquisition between SWFMD and the Board of Trustees for the Internal Improvement Trust Fund was done to purchase an additional 1,400 acres (5.7 km^{2}).

The preserve contains mangrove forests, freshwater and saltwater wetlands, and upland habitats. Restoration work aims to return former agricultural land to natural habitat.

== Activities ==
Hiking, kayaking and fishing are the main recreational activities in the preserve. Its trails are open to pedestrians only, and admission is free.
