= Manatee County, Florida =

County in Florida, United States

- U.S. county
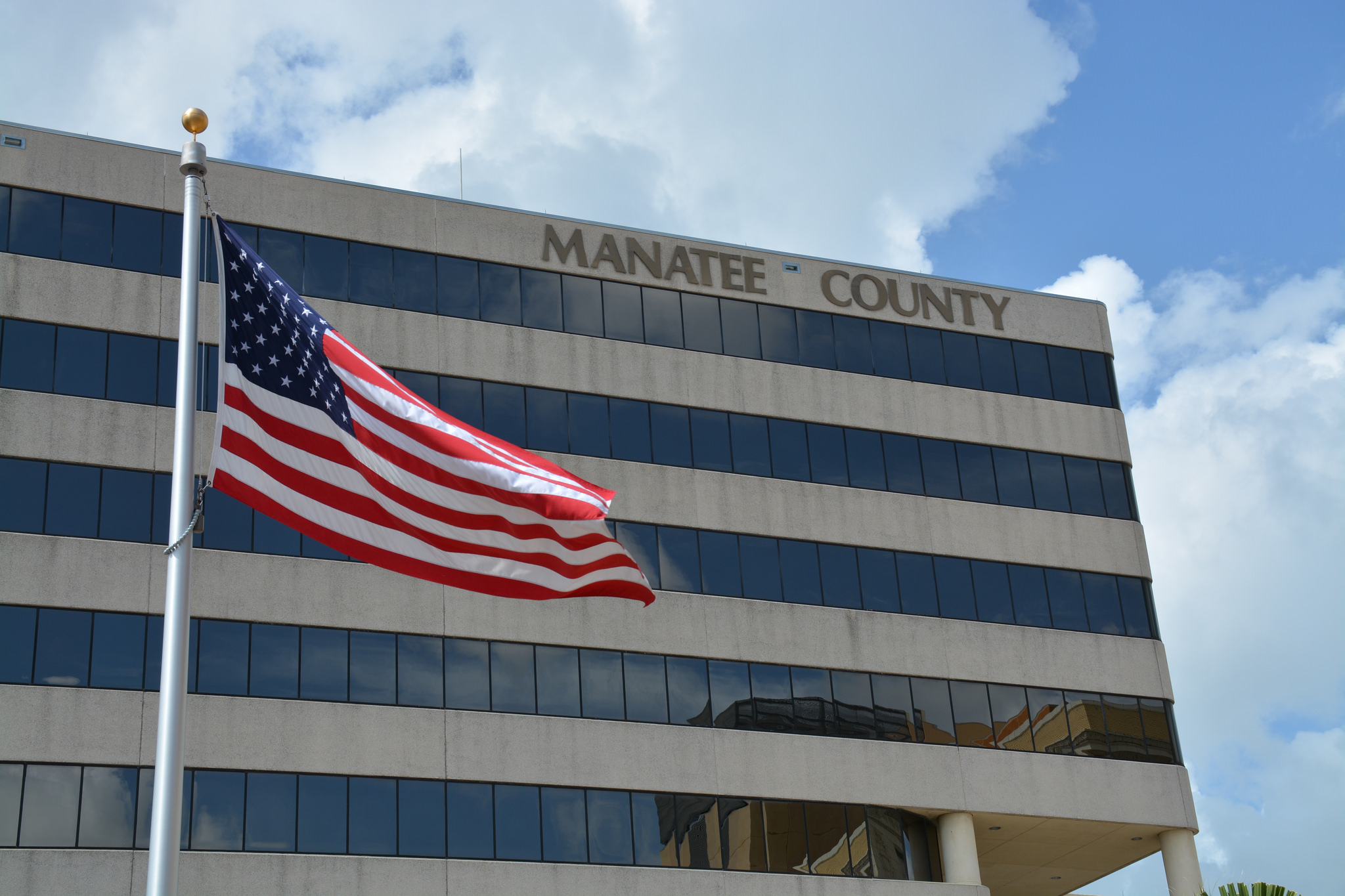
- Manatee County Administration Building

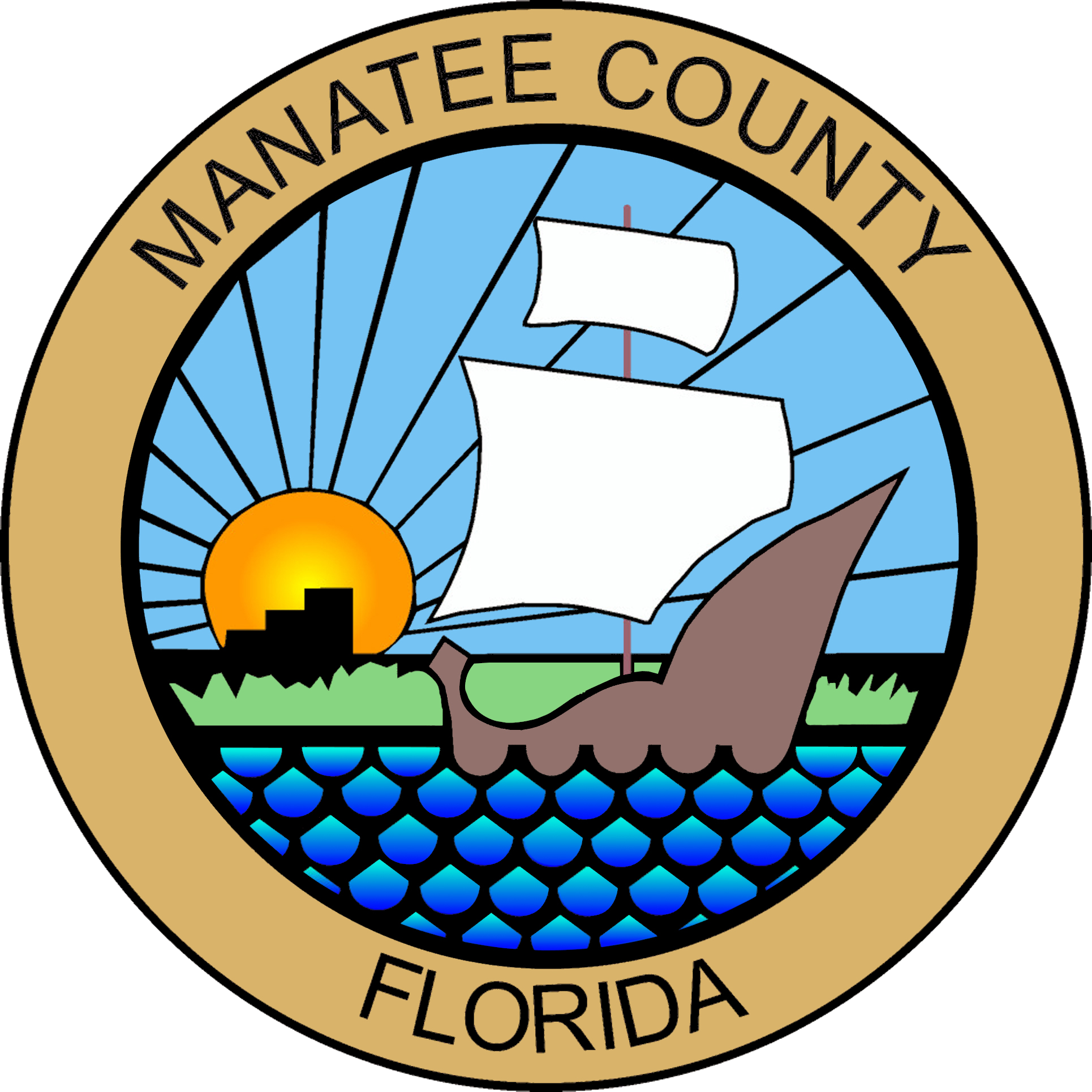
- Seal Logo

- Location within the U.S. state of Florida
- Country: United States
- State: Florida
- Founded: January 9, 1855
- Named for: Florida manatee
- Seat: Bradenton
- Largest city: Bradenton

Area
  - Total: 893 sq mi (2,310 km^{2})
  - Land: 743 sq mi (1,920 km^{2})
  - Water: 150 sq mi (390 km^{2}) 16.8%

Population (2020)
  - Total: 399,710
  - Estimate (2025): 468,200 ▲
  - Density: 538/sq mi (208/km^{2})
- Time zone: UTC−5 (Eastern)
  - Summer (DST): UTC−4 (EDT)
- Area code: 941
- Congressional district: 16th
- Website: www.mymanatee.org

Manatee County is located in the U.S. state of Florida. As of the 2020 United States census, its population was 399,710. Manatee County is part of the Sarasota metropolitan area. Its county seat and largest city is Bradenton, Florida. The county was created in 1855 and named for the West Indian manatee, Florida's official marine mammal. Features of Manatee County include access to the southern part of the Tampa Bay estuary, the Sunshine Skyway Bridge, and the Manatee River.

== History ==
=== Prehistoric history ===
The area now known as Manatee County had been inhabited by Native Americans for thousands of years. Shell middens and other archaeological digs have been conducted throughout the county, including at Terra Ceia and Perico Island. These digs revealed materials belonging to peoples from the Woodland period.

=== European exploration and early settlement ===
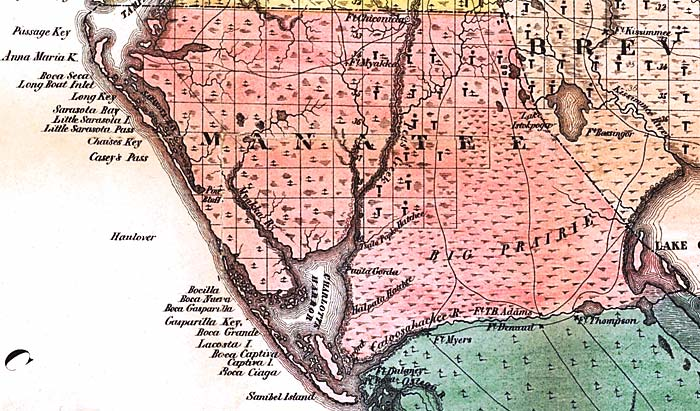
Map of Manatee County in 1856, shortly after its creation

Some historians have suggested that the southern mouth of the Manatee River was the landing site of the De Soto Expedition.

Due to conflict during the Patriot War and First Seminole War, many Native American and African American refugees fled to the Tampa Bay region of Florida, and some settled in now-Manatee County. The settlement they founded on the Manatee River was called Angola. By 1819, the population of Angola may have reached as high as 700 people.

The Manatee area was opened to settlement in 1842 with the passing of the federal Armed Occupation Act. Early settlements included the Manatee Colony led by Colonel Samuel Reid that numbered 31 individuals, both black and white. Other prominent early settlers were Joseph and Hector Braden who moved into an area near the Manatee River in 1842. The two had lost their land for their plantations in Northern Florida during the Panic of 1837. They were said to have heard that land in the area was abundant. The brothers moved into a log cabin five miles north of the mouth of the Manatee River. Four years later, Hector drowned while trying to cross the Manatee River on his horse during a hurricane. Despite this tragic event, Joseph decided he would still build the Braden sugar mill (Note: Sugar production became a major industry in the area during the 1840s, and several major sugar works were established.) at the mouth of the Manatee and Braden Rivers. He later built a dock where Main Street was and fortified the area near his house by building a stockade. A few years later in 1851, he built the Braden Castle, which was made out of tabby and served as his residence. In spring of 1856, the fortified home was attacked by Seminole Indians during the Third Seminole War. It later became a popular tourist attraction in the early 1900s with Tin Can Tourists. He only stayed there for the next six years before moving to Tallahassee.

=== County formation and development ===
Manatee County was carved out from a vast Hillsborough County in January 1855 and led by Florida Senate President Hamlin V. Snell. The new county covered 5,000 square miles and included all of what are now Charlotte, DeSoto, Glades, Hardee, Highlands, part of Lee, and Sarasota Counties. The original county seat was Manatee, a village on the southern shore of the Manatee River in what now is eastern Bradenton. In 1866, the county seat was moved from the village of Manatee to Pine Level, as a result of a referendum mandated by the Florida Legislature. In 1887, the county seat was moved again due to the creation of DeSoto County within the existing boundaries. Braiden Town (Bradenton) was selected as the new county seat by referendum of the county residents who mostly resided near the Manatee River. In 1921, Sarasota County was created by the Florida Legislature, which further reduced Manatee County to its current boundaries.

=== American Civil War ===
Following the Seminole Wars, Manatee County continued to grow in both population and economic output. Hogs and some sheep were raised, but the land was primarily used for cattle raising. The cattle-to-person ratio in Manatee County in 1860 was 37 to one. Processed sugar and molasses were produced and exported. This agricultural economy, like much of the south, was increasingly becoming reliant on slave labor. A federal census in 1860 showed that the county had a population of 601 white people and 214 enslaved black people. After the outbreak of the American Civil War, Manatee County provided supplies to the Confederate army. Aside from the Union blockade, the Federal army dispatched raiding parties throughout Florida to further limit the Confederate supply chain. For example in August 1864, the Union schooner USS Stonewall came up the Manatee River on a raid. According to the Florida State Archives, Dr. Braden's sugar works were destroyed during the raid. However, another source states that Braden's property was left untouched.

According to a partial list of soldiers of the Confederate States of America, the county also sent at least 100 of its citizens to fight. Some of the men from Manatee were recruited to the 7th Florida Infantry Regiment, which fought as part of the Army of Tennessee.

Within Manatee County is the Gamble Plantation, a sugar plantation and home of Major Robert Gamble. Following the Civil War, in May 1865, the Confederate secretary of state, Judah P. Benjamin, took refuge at the mansion for several weeks before escaping to England.

== Geography ==
According to the U.S. Census Bureau, the county has a total area of 893 square miles (2,310 km^{2}), of which 150 square miles (390 km^{2}) (17%) are covered by water.

=== Adjacent counties ===
- Hillsborough County – north
- Polk County – northeast
- Hardee County – east
- DeSoto County – southeast
- Sarasota County – south

=== State and nationally protected areas ===
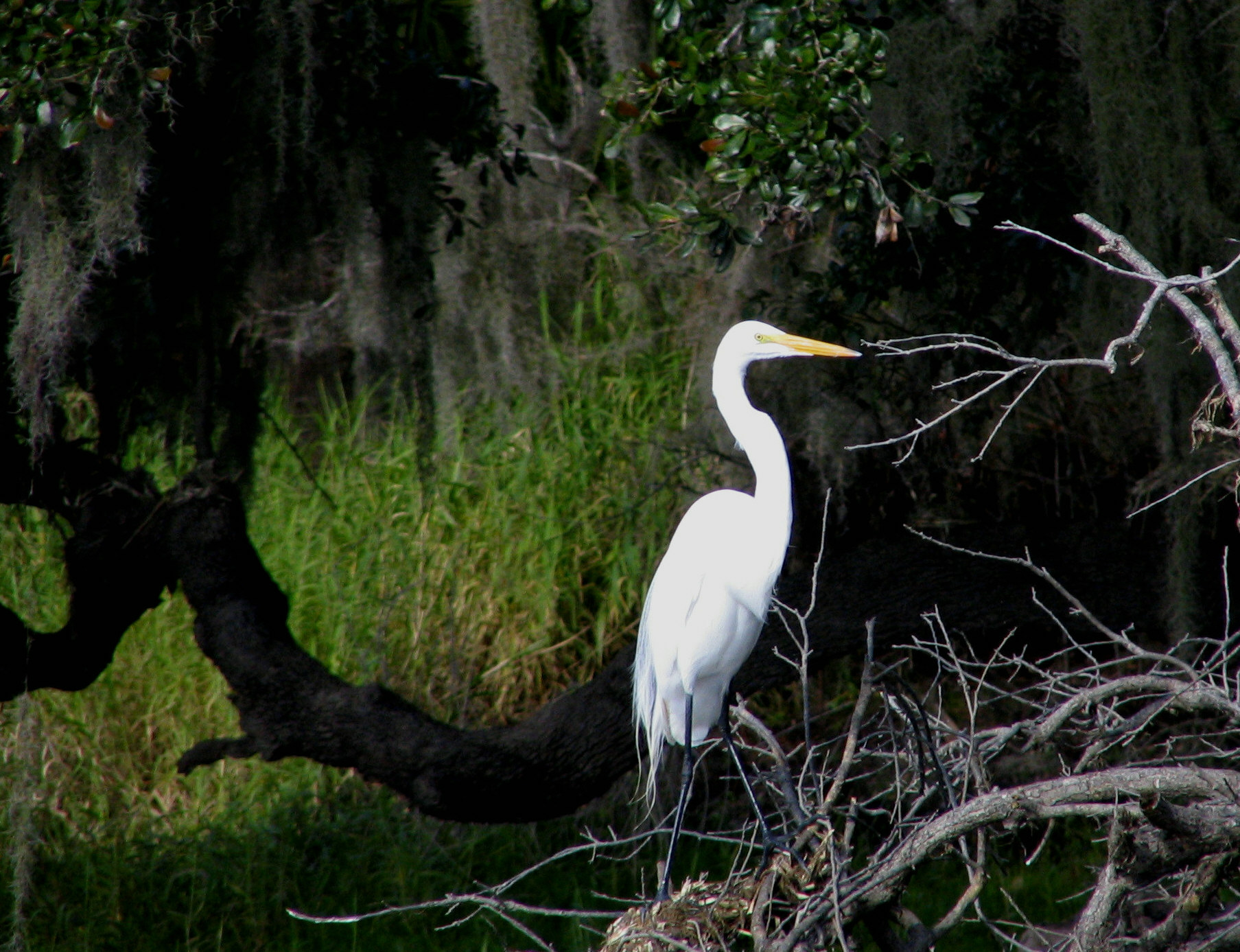
A great egret in Myakka River State Park

- De Soto National Memorial
- Lake Manatee State Park
- Madira Bickel Mound State Archaeological Site
- Myakka River State Park
- Passage Key National Wildlife Refuge
- Terra Ceia Preserve State Park
- Wingate Creek State Park
- Pillsbury Mound Preserve

=== Rivers ===
- Manatee River
  - Wares Creek
  - Braden River
    - Gamble Creek
- Bowlees Creek

=== Lakes ===
- Ward Lake
- Lake Parrish
- Lake Manatee

== Demographics ==
Historical population
Census	Pop.	Note	%±
1860	854		—
1870	1,931		126.1%
1880	3,544		83.5%
1890	2,895		−18.3%
1900	4,663		61.1%
1910	9,550		104.8%
1920	18,712		95.9%
1930	22,502		20.3%
1940	26,098		16.0%
1950	34,704		33.0%
1960	69,168		99.3%
1970	97,115		40.4%
1980	148,442		52.9%
1990	211,707		42.6%
2000	264,002		24.7%
2010	322,833		22.3%
2020	399,710		23.8%
2025 (est.)	468,200	▲	17.1%
U.S. Decennial Census

=== 2020 census ===
As of the 2020 census, the county had a population of 399,710 and 168,437 households. Of those households, 23.1% had children under 18, 49.3% were married-couple households, 16.6% had a male householder with no spouse or partner present, 27.1% had a female householder with no spouse or partner present, 27.9% were someone living alone, with 15.5% 65 or older.

The median age was 49.4 years; 18.3% of residents were under 18 and 27.9% were 65 or older. For every 100 females, there were 93.1 males, and for every 100 females age 18 and over, there were 91.1 males 18 and over.

The racial makeup of the county was 72.3% White, 8.0% Black or African American, 0.4% American Indian and Alaska Native, 2.1% Asian, 0.1% Native Hawaiian and Pacific Islander, 6.6% from some other race, and 10.4% from two or more races. Hispanic or Latino residents of any race comprised 17.8% of the population.

About 95.3% of residents lived in urban areas, while 4.7% lived in rural areas.

Of the 206,633 housing units, 18.5% were vacant. Among occupied housing units, 71.0% were owner-occupied and 29.0% were renter-occupied. The homeowner vacancy rate was 2.3% and the rental vacancy rate was 12.8%.

The median income for a household in the county was $59,963 in 2020, with a per capita income in the past 12 months of $35,146. A reported 10.9% of the population lived in poverty.

=== Racial and ethnic composition ===
Manatee County, Florida – Racial and ethnic composition Note: the US Census treats Hispanic/Latino as an ethnic category. This table excludes Latinos from the racial categories and assigns them to a separate category. Hispanics/Latinos may be of any race.
Race / Ethnicity (NH = Non-Hispanic)	Pop 1980	Pop 1990	Pop 2000	Pop 2010	Pop 2020	% 1980	% 1990	% 2000	% 2010	% 2020
White alone (NH)	131,276	184,568	212,664	236,950	273,101	88.44%	87.18%	80.55%	73.40%	68.32%
Black or African American alone (NH)	13,106	15,971	21,136	27,228	31,147	8.83%	7.54%	8.01%	8.43%	7.79%
Native American or Alaska Native alone (NH)	259	439	527	608	779	0.17%	0.21%	0.20%	0.19%	0.19%
Asian alone (NH)	405	1,192	2,330	5,203	8,433	0.27%	0.56%	0.88%	1.61%	2.11%
Native Hawaiian or Pacific Islander alone (NH)	x	x	92	168	246	x	x	0.03%	0.05%	0.06%
Other race alone (NH)	211	113	253	521	1,583	0.14%	0.05%	0.10%	0.16%	0.40%
Multiracial (NH)	x	x	2,460	4,200	13,442	x	x	0.93%	1.30%	3.36%
Hispanic or Latino (any race)	3,185	9,424	24,540	47,955	70,979	2.15%	4.45%	9.30%	14.85%	17.76%
Total	148,442	211,707	264,002	322,833	399,710	100.00%	100.00%	100.00%	100.00%	100.00%

== Economy ==
Bealls of Florida has its headquarters and was founded 1915 in unincorporated Manatee County.

Tropicana was founded in Manatee County in the 1950s. Tropicana was bought by PepsiCo in 2001. PepsiCo sold Tropicana to a French private equity firm in 2021.

== Libraries ==
Manatee County Public Library System
- 27°29′55.2″N 82°34′29″W
- Location: 1301 Barcarrota Blvd West; Bradenton, Florida 34203
- Type: Public
- Established: 1964
- Branches: 7

Collection
- Items collected: books, movies, newspapers
- Size: 30,000

Access and use
- Population served: 322,000
- Members: 20,000

Other information
- Budget: $25,000
- Employees: 120
- Website: mymanatee.org/library

The Manatee County Public Library System offers a collection of adult, young adult, and children's materials, as well as a genealogy section and a local history collection in the form of the Eaton Florida History Reading Room. Public computers are available at all library locations. The library also has a digital collection that includes e-books through OverDrive, Inc. and Libby; television shows, movies and more e-books through Hoopla; and magazines through Flipster; and local images and documents from the late nineteenth century to the early 1980s.

The libraries also offer author luncheons, children's story times, summer reading programs, job fairs, and book discussion groups.

The library system serves the county in seven locations:

- Central - Bradenton
- Palmetto - Palmetto
- Braden River - Bradenton
- Island - Holmes Beach
- South Manatee - Bradenton
- Rocky Bluff - Ellenton
- Lakewood Ranch - Bradenton
- Talking Book Library is administered through the Bureau of Braille and Talking Books Library, Daytona

In September 2021, a seventh branch was approved by county commissioners, to be built in Lakewood Ranch. The library's grand opening was on January 12, 2024.

Library cards are free to those who reside, own property, attend school, or work in Manatee County. Non-residents may obtain a temporary card upon payment of a $25.00 annual fee.

Manatee County participates in the Little Free Library program. Several Little Free Libraries are at parks and other public places around the county.

=== History of libraries ===
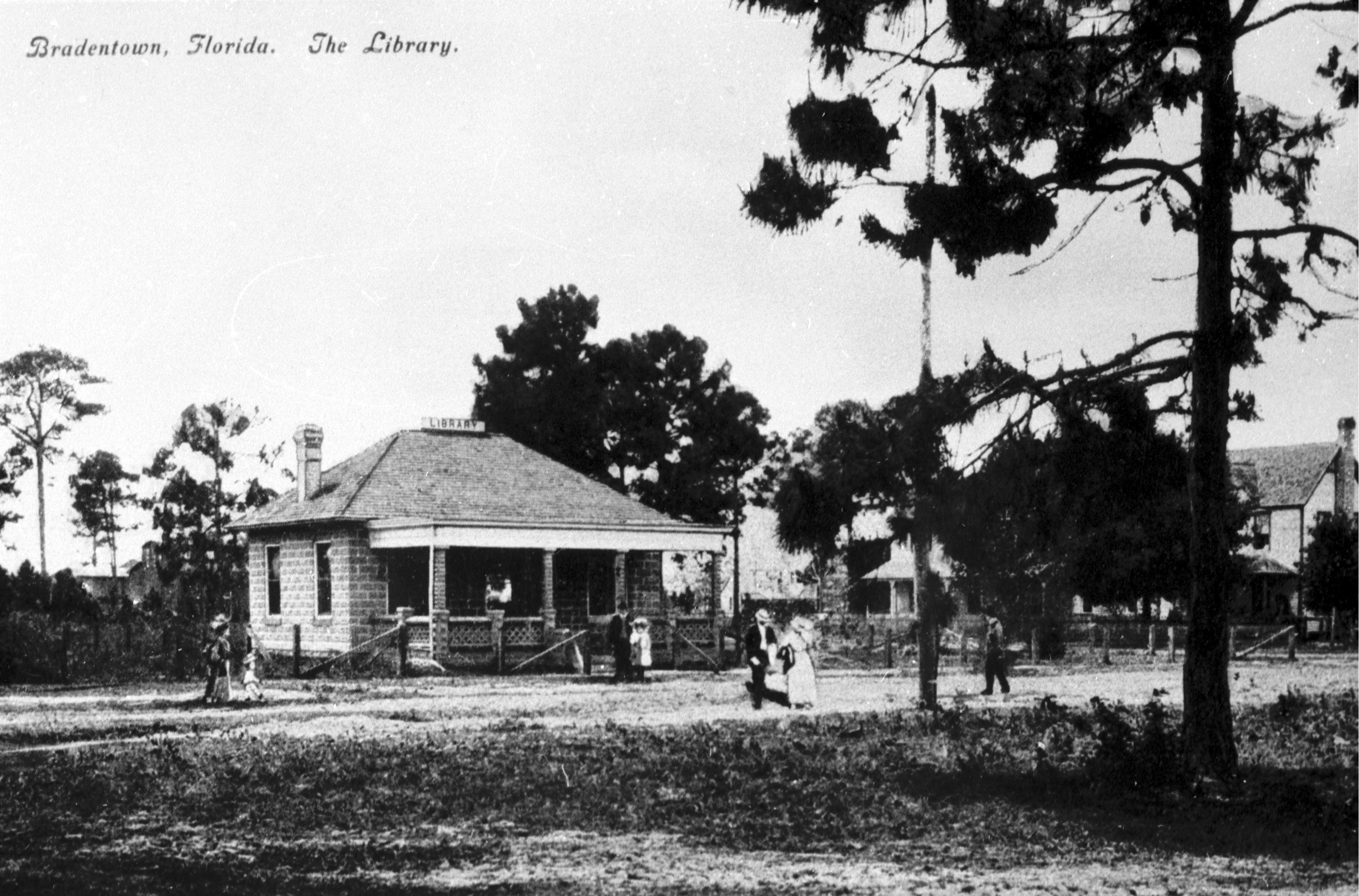
Original Bradenton Library

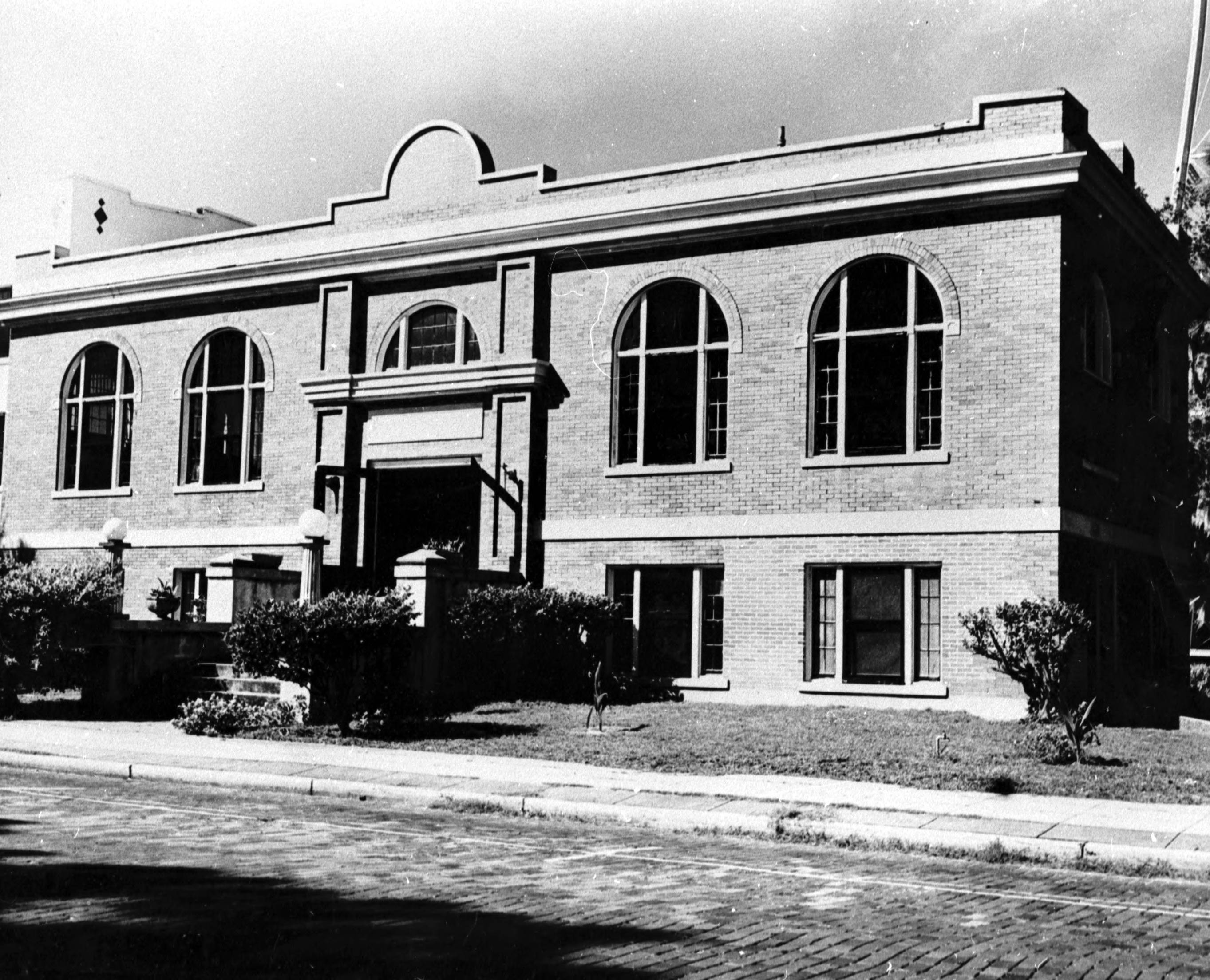
Palmetto's Carnegie Library, built in 1914

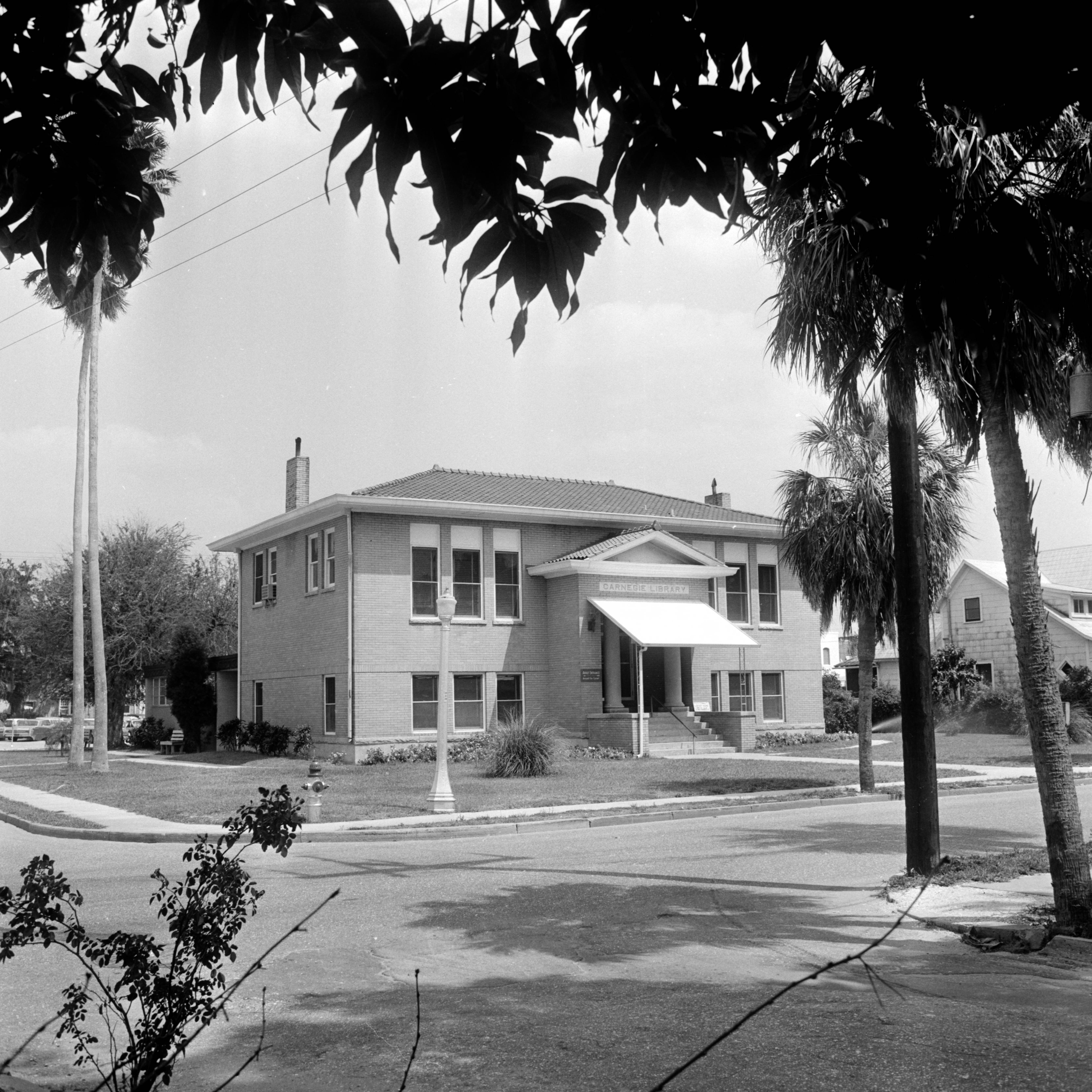
Bradenton's Carnegie Library, built in 1918

Manatee County's first public library was a privately owned rental library created by Julia Fuller at the Mrs. Bass Dry Goods store in 1898. The county's first independent library opened in Bradenton in 1907, followed a Carnegie Library in Palmetto in 1914 and another in Bradenton in 1918. For much of the twentieth century, both cities' libraries were free to city residents while county residents had to pay a non-resident fee. In 1964, the Bradenton and Palmetto library associations merged with the Manatee County government to create the Manatee County Public Library System. This was followed by the establishment of a bookmobile for rural areas in 1964 and a Talking Books program for the blind in 1966.

As demands on the bookmobile grew and the library collection outstripped the existing buildings in Bradenton and Palmetto, the first branch of the Manatee County Public Library system was built in Bayshore in 1967, followed by a new branch on East Ninth Street in 1969 and an Island branch in 1971, the last of which was moved into a new building in 1983. A new building for the Palmetto Library was built in 1969, followed by the modern Central Public Library in downtown Bradenton in 1978.

The 1990s saw a period of rapid growth in Manatee County and the library system grew accordingly, with the Braden River, Rocky Bluff, and South Manatee branches opening in 1991, 1994, and 1998, respectively. The Braden River branch moved to a new building in 1997. The Rocky Bluff location would be moved to a larger location, featuring a built in café, in 2011. The new location is still physically within Ellenton. The additions as well as investment into various technologies such as modern computers, a 3-D Printing Lab, as well as new loanable items, brings Manatee County Libraries to its modern services.

Reciprocal borrowing began in 2000 between Manatee and Sarasota County Libraries, which would be followed by statewide reciprocal borrowing programs. Starting in 2017, the Manatee County library system began offering items including musical instruments, tools, telescopes, binoculars, cake pans, hotspots, and museum passes. During the COVID-19 pandemic, the library system began offering WiFi hotspots to patrons in order to provide internet service remotely to work safely and at home. This began in Spring of 2020.

On December 15, 2021, the county broke ground for a new East County library, which was to serve the community of Lakewood Ranch. The new library was scheduled to open mid-2023. The new library, dubbed the Lakewood Ranch Library, had its grand opening on January 12, 2024.

== Education ==
=== Primary and secondary education ===
- Manatee County School District – Public K-12 School district serving all of Manatee County

=== Higher education ===
- Lake Erie College of Osteopathic Medicine (LECOM) Bradenton – Private, nonprofit graduate school of medicine, dentistry, and pharmacy
- State College of Florida, Manatee–Sarasota (SCF) – Public, four-year state college, branch campus of State College of Florida
- University of South Florida Sarasota-Manatee campus (USF)-Preeminent, Public Research University and member of the American Association of Universities (AAU)

== Communities ==
Map of Manatee County indicating incorporated municipalities: 1. Anna Maria; 2. Bradenton; 3. Bradenton Beach; 4. Holmes Beach; 5. Longboat Key; 6. Palmetto

=== Cities ===
- Anna Maria
- Bradenton
- Bradenton Beach
- Holmes Beach
- Palmetto

=== Town ===
- Longboat Key (part)

=== Census-designated places ===
- Bayshore Gardens
- Cortez
- Ellenton
- Lakewood Ranch (part)
- Memphis
- Samoset
- South Bradenton
- West Bradenton
- West Samoset
- Whitfield

=== Unincorporated places ===
- Cedar Hammock
- Duette
- Elwood Park
- Fort Hamer
- Foxleigh
- Gillette
- Lake Manatee
- Manavista
- Manhattan
- Marsh Island
- Memphis Heights
- Myakka City
- Oak Knoll
- Oneco
- Palm View
- Palma Sola
- Parrish
- Rattlesnake Key
- Rubonia
- Rye
- Snead Island
- Tara
- Terra Ceia
- Verna
- Village of the Arts
- Ward Lake
- Waterbury
- Willow

== Transportation ==
Manatee County has a county transportation service, MCAT. It serves this county, Pinellas County, and Sarasota County.

=== Airports ===
- Sarasota–Bradenton International Airport
- Airport Manatee 48X, a small local airport located near US Highway 41 and SeaPort Manatee.

=== Interstates ===
- Interstate 75 – the county's major north-south limited-access freeway
- Interstate 275 – the Interstate begins westward from I-75 near Palmetto and has an interchange with US Highway 41 (Tamiami Trail) and begins a concurrency with US Route 19 for 13 miles (21 km) including the Sunshine Skyway Bridge

=== U.S. Highways ===
- U.S. Route 19
- U.S. Route 41, Tamiami Trail
- U.S. Route 301

=== State and County Roads ===
- State Road 64
- State Road 70
- State Road 684 (Cortez Road)
- State Road 789
- State Road 62
- State Road 37
- Rutland Road
- University Parkway

=== Waterways ===
- Intracoastal Waterway
- Manatee River

=== Ports ===
- SeaPort Manatee

== Government ==
=== Political history ===
Manatee County is part of the strongly Republican Sun Belt. The area became a Republican stronghold following World War II and has remained so since: the last Democrat to win Manatee County was Franklin D. Roosevelt in 1944.

During the peak of the Socialist Party's prominence in the early 20th century, Manatee County would elect the only socialist to the state legislature, Andrew Jackson Pettigrew to the Florida House of Representatives in 1906 for one term defeating John A. Graham (who was a Democrat) in the general election. As a state legislator he would make several proposals that were inline with what the Party reflected at the national level such as making US Senators popularly elected and creating a national income tax. Overall as a state legislator he would make little progress in getting legislation proposed by him passed. Prior to the 1906 race he would run in 1904 for the same position unsuccessfully losing to A.T. Cornwell (also a Democrat) who had served as Bradenton's first mayor and in a variety of positions at the county level. Pettigrew would later go on to run for governor in 1908 and Secretary of Agriculture in 1912 being unsuccessful in both races.

In 1970, Governor Claude R. Kirk Jr. fired Manatee County's superintendent along with the entire school board and appointed himself in their place in an attempt to end desegregation busing. This situation would last from April 6 to 13 before Kirk left his position as the superintendent.

=== Law enforcement and justice ===
==== Sheriff's Office ====
Unincorporated Manatee County is served by the Manatee County Sheriff's Office.

==== Justice ====
===== Circuit Court =====
Manatee County is a part of the Twelfth Circuit Court of Florida.

===== Court of Appeals =====
Manatee County is part of the Second District of Appeals.

=== Recent presidential election results ===
United States presidential election results for Manatee County, Florida
Year	Republican		Democratic		Third party(ies)	
Year	No.	%	No.	%	No.	%
1892	0	0.00%	348	83.25%	70	16.75%
1896	135	21.26%	480	75.59%	20	3.15%
1900	60	8.72%	535	77.76%	93	13.52%
1904	91	10.64%	592	69.24%	172	20.12%
1908	93	10.23%	644	70.85%	172	18.92%
1912	55	5.31%	712	68.73%	269	25.97%
1916	289	18.67%	1,033	66.73%	226	14.60%
1920	884	30.83%	1,790	62.43%	193	6.73%
1924	629	32.54%	1,064	55.04%	240	12.42%
1928	2,705	63.87%	1,472	34.76%	58	1.37%
1932	1,280	30.67%	2,894	69.33%	0	0.00%
1936	1,455	29.44%	3,487	70.56%	0	0.00%
1940	1,983	27.87%	5,131	72.13%	0	0.00%
1944	2,218	32.80%	4,544	67.20%	0	0.00%
1948	3,371	44.30%	2,766	36.35%	1,473	19.36%
1952	9,055	66.40%	4,583	33.60%	0	0.00%
1956	11,904	68.82%	5,394	31.18%	0	0.00%
1960	16,462	65.13%	8,814	34.87%	0	0.00%
1964	17,147	56.74%	13,074	43.26%	0	0.00%
1968	18,247	52.51%	8,286	23.85%	8,214	23.64%
1972	32,664	79.79%	8,058	19.68%	218	0.53%
1976	29,300	53.90%	24,342	44.78%	718	1.32%
1980	40,535	61.81%	21,679	33.06%	3,362	5.13%
1984	55,793	72.75%	20,889	27.24%	6	0.01%
1988	51,187	65.53%	26,624	34.08%	302	0.39%
1992	42,725	42.63%	33,841	33.77%	23,654	23.60%
1996	44,136	45.56%	41,891	43.24%	10,851	11.20%
2000	58,023	52.58%	49,226	44.61%	3,095	2.80%
2004	81,318	56.62%	61,262	42.66%	1,041	0.72%
2008	80,721	52.94%	70,034	45.93%	1,712	1.12%
2012	85,627	55.65%	66,503	43.22%	1,736	1.13%
2016	101,944	56.40%	71,224	39.40%	7,589	4.20%
2020	124,987	57.47%	90,166	41.46%	2,319	1.07%
2024	140,486	61.13%	86,674	37.72%	2,652	1.15%

=== Government officials ===
==== United States Senate ====
Office	Senator	Party
Class 3 Senator	Ashley Moody	Republican
Class 1 Senator	Rick Scott	Republican

==== United States House of Representatives ====
District	Representative	Party
Florida's 16th Congressional District	Vern Buchanan	Republican

==== Florida State Senate ====
District	Senator	Party
21	Jim Boyd	Republican
22	Joe Gruters	Republican

==== Florida House of Representatives ====
District	Representative	Party
70	Michael Owen	Republican
71	Will Robinson	Republican
72	Bill Conerly	Republican

==== Manatee County Board of County Commissioners ====
The Board of Commissioners includes the following:

Position	Incumbent
District 1	Carol Ann Felts
District 2	Amanda Ballard
District 3	Tal Siddique
District 4	Mike Rahn
District 5	Bob McCann
District 6 (Note: At-large, representing the entire county.)	Jason Bearden
District 7	George Kruse (Chair)

==== Public education ====
Manatee County School Board
Position	Incumbent	Term ends
District 1	Heather Felton	November 2028
District 2	Cindy Spray	November 2026
District 3	Charlie Kennedy	November 2028
District 4	Chad Choate III	November 2026
District 5	Richard Tatem	November 2026

==== Other offices ====
Constitutional officers
Office	Name	Party	First elected
Clerk of the Circuit Court	Angelina M. Colonneso	Republican	2015†
Property Appraiser	Charles E. Hackney	Republican	1992
Sheriff	Rick Wells	Republican	2016†
Supervisor of Elections	Scott Farrington	Republican	2024
Tax Collector	Ken Burton, Jr	Republican	1992

=== Voter registration ===
Information as of November 4, 2025.

Voter registration and party enrollment
Party	Number of voters	Percentage
Republican	135,990	49.65%
Democratic	65,699	23.99%
Others	72,184	26.36%
Total	273,873	100%

== See also ==
- National Register of Historic Places listings in Manatee County, Florida
