= Braden River =

River in Florida, United States

Coordinates: 27°25′38″N 82°26′27″W

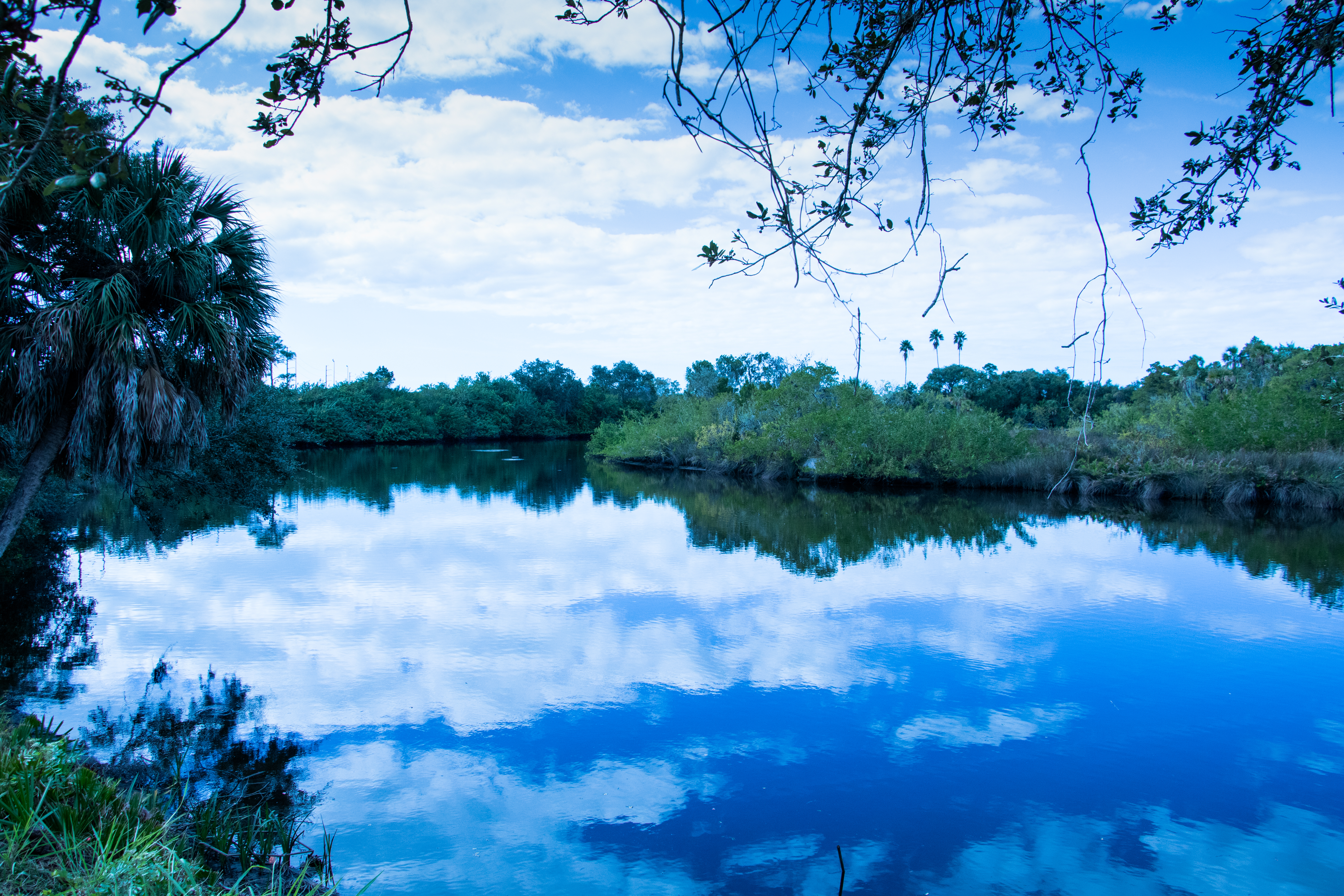
- Braden River near bridge at 53rd Avenue East

Location
- Country: United States

Physical characteristics
- Mouth
  - location: Manatee River
- Length: 21 mi (34 km)
- Basin size: 83 mi^{2} (210 km^{2})

The Braden River is a 21-mile (34 km) waterway that drains an 83-square-mile (210 km^{2}) area watershed in west-central Florida and is the largest tributary of the Manatee River.

== Hydrology ==
The hydrology of the Braden River was altered in 1936 when the city of Bradenton created Ward Lake, a reservoir with an 838-foot (255 m) broad-crested weir 6 miles (9.7 km) upstream from the mouth. In 1985 the reservoir was expanded and supplies an annual average of 5.7 million US gallons (22,000 m^{3}) of water per day.

The Braden River can be hydrologically divided into three distinct sections that include an 8.6-mile (13.8 km) reach of naturally incised, free-flowing channel; a 6.4-mile (10.3 km) reach of impounded river created by the Ward Lake reservoir and weir; and a 6-mile (9.7 km) reach of tidal estuary.
