= Lake Manatee State Park =

State park in Florida, United States

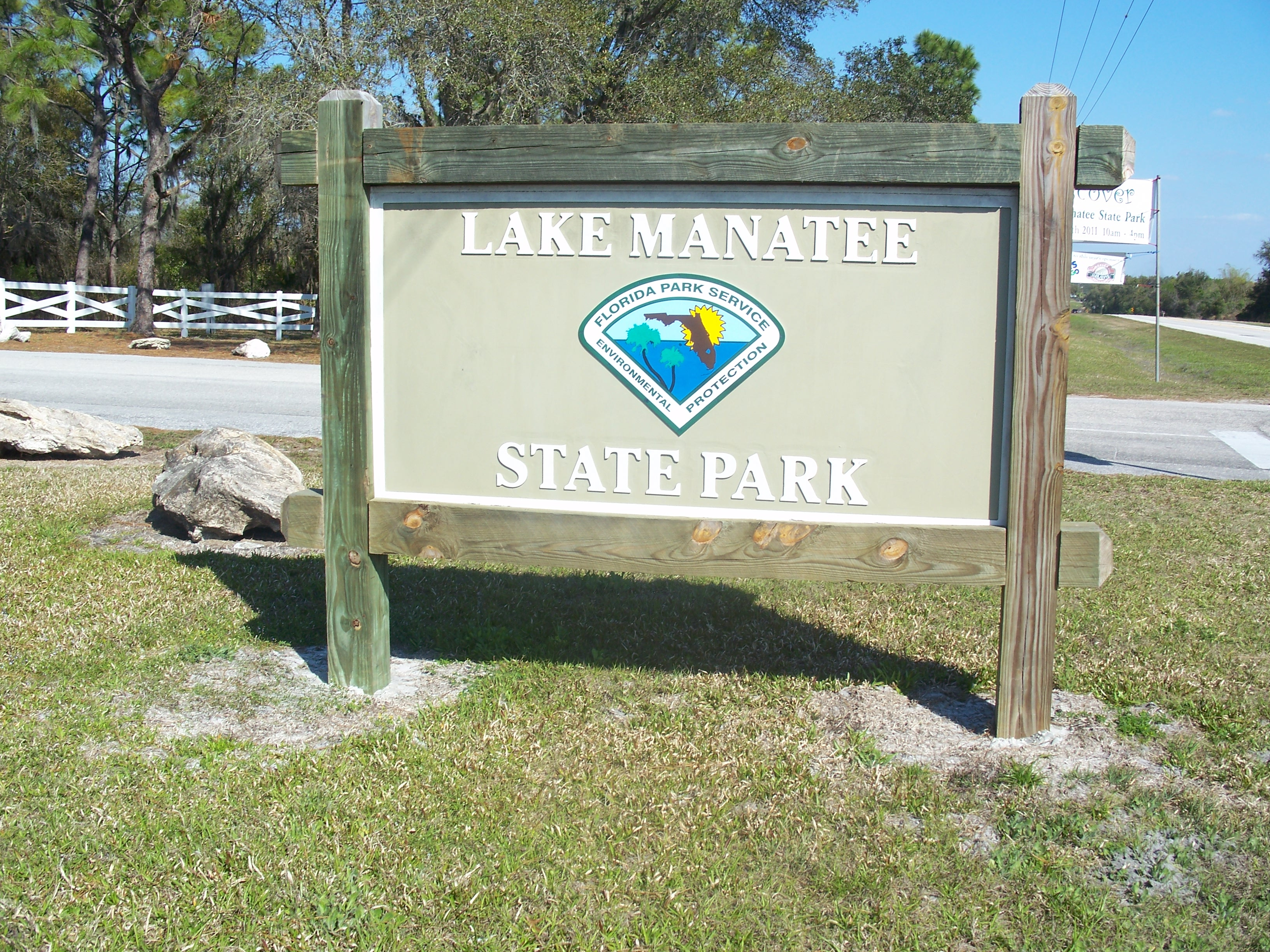
- Lake Manatee State Park: Park sign

- Location within Florida Location within the United States
- Interactive map of Lake Manatee State Park
- Location: Manatee County, Florida, USA
- Nearest city: Bradenton, Florida
- Coordinates: 27°28′41″N 82°20′10″W
- Governing body: Florida Department of Environmental Protection

Lake Manatee State Park (Lake Manatee State Recreation Area) is a 556-acre (2.3 km^{2}) State Park in the U.S. state of Florida, located on the south shore of 2,400-acre (10 km^{2}) Lake Manatee. It is 9 miles (14 km) east of I-75 on State Road 64 in Bradenton. It is made up of pine flatwoods, Sand Pine scrub, marshes, and hardwood forests.

Activities include canoeing and kayaking, camping, boating, picnicking, swimming. Among the wildlife of the park are alligators, turtles, osprey. Amenities include a 60-site campground, boat ramp, dock, and picnic area. The park is open from 8:00 am till sundown year-round.
