= Myakka City, Florida =

Unincorporated community in Florida, United States

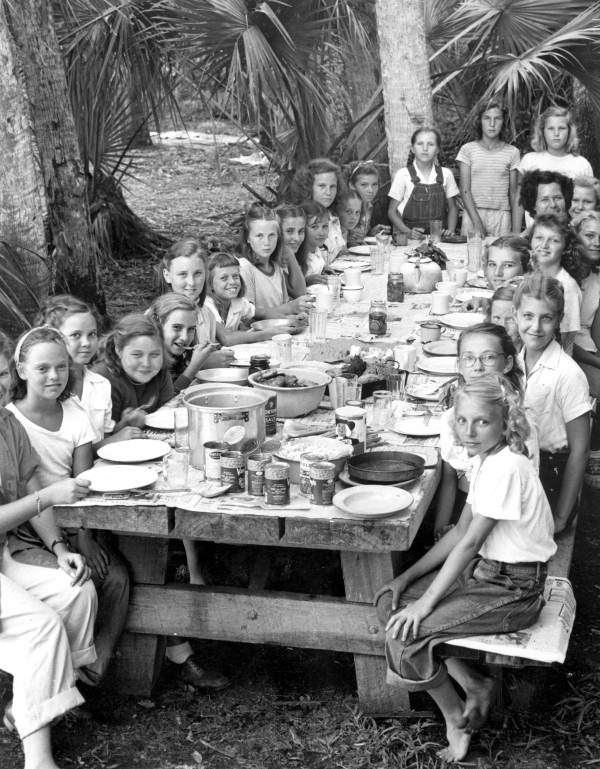
July 4 picnic in Myakka City, 1948

Myakka City (also Myakka) is an unincorporated community in southeastern Manatee County, Florida, United States. It lies along State Road 70 near the city of Bradenton, the county seat of Manatee County. Its elevation is 43 feet (13 m), and it is located at 27°20′59″N 82°9′41″W (27.3497671, -82.1614780). Although Myakka is unincorporated, it has a post office, with the ZIP code of 34251; the ZCTA for ZIP code 34251 had a population of 6,351 at the 2010 census, up from 4,239 in 2000.

== History ==
Myakka is a name believed to be derived from an unidentified Native American language, from the same word used as the namesake for Miami. Myakka City was founded by Frank Earl Knox (1870–1950) in 1915, after purchasing early pioneer William Durrance's land a year earlier. Knox's original plan was for 91 blocks, each with 10 home sites. The new town also opened its post office the same year, as well as a new school. The school opened November 2, 1915, and registered 35 pupils, and Mr. and Mrs. Carl Park were the first teachers. Knox chose to call the new town Myakka City to differentiate it from Old Miakka, an early pioneer settlement that lay to the west. A retired judge from New Jersey, Knox became interested in the area due to rumors of an east-west railroad to be constructed. Knox wanted the track to go through his planned dream town. The East and West Coast Railway, a subsidiary of Seaboard Air Line Railroad, was constructed at the same time the post office opened. The opening was delayed by several days due to floods destroying Horse Creek Bridge, affecting the areas between Arcadia and Myakka. The route from Bradenton to Myakka was unaffected. The train depot was constructed from Florida-based materials, in Myakka City's own sawmills.

The little town's hotel was owned and operated by James Q. Baker, and locals and visitors alike stayed there. The town was prospering so well that there was even discussion of building a junior high school in the area. Lumber sawmills, turpentine, and agriculture were the main industries. Baker also operated a sawmill, but by 1916, had sold the hotel and moved into East Myakka, where his mill was located. In the late 1910s, the E.E. Edge Turpentine Company operated east of Myakka City in an area known as Edgeville, coming from Groveland, a town in Lake County, Florida. By the 1920s, the Florida land boom was in full swing. Knox responded by issuing a second plan of the town and renaming his company, from Myakka Fruit Farms to Bradenton Suburban Company, as well as the town's streets, for the sake of modernization. A 1926 advertisement noted that the new town consisted of 300,000 acres and a population of 250. In addition to a railroad station, the town also sported a four-room school building with three teachers, plus two churches, three stores, a warehouse, a hotel, and a large garage. Knox and other county officials desired a hard-surface highway that connected the town with Bradenton, with the intention of taking the highway further east to the border with Desoto County.

Up until that point, travelers journeyed on sandy, rutted and often flooded roads, particularly during rainy seasons. The land boom was short-lived; with the onset of the Great Depression, the town saw a decline. The area had been deforested, despite a railroad official's claim that there were abundant trees to last the sawmills fifty years, and timber to keep several sawmills in operation for half a century. The railroad tracks were subsequently removed and reportedly sent to South America by the mid-1930s.

Compiled in the late 1930s and first published in 1939, the Florida guide listed Myakka City's population as 125 and described it as:

a roadside settlement and trading center for near-by truck farmers and citrus growers along the Miakka River ... In this section live many old-time Floridians, who settled here shortly after the War between the States. Almost all are landowners; their sun-bleached one-story frame houses, with center hall or 'breezeway,' sit well back from sandy roads. They are raised high above the ground on posts to prevent dry rot and to escape attacks of termites; all have vine-shaded verandas, occupied on Sunday by a rocking-chair brigade; even the poorest houses have well-tended vegetable and flower gardens about them, and in many cases a few citrus trees. These people live on their own garden produce, slaughter and cure their own meats, and depend on the market for little.

— Federal Writers' Project, "Part III: The Florida Loop", Florida: A Guide to the Southernmost State (1947)

In 1953, the little town's population was about 100, with 36 residences. Today, the area has continued to be largely agricultural and sparsely populated, and the post office is still in operation as of 2021. The original schoolhouse has been preserved, and is undergoing renovation as a multi-purpose community and history center.

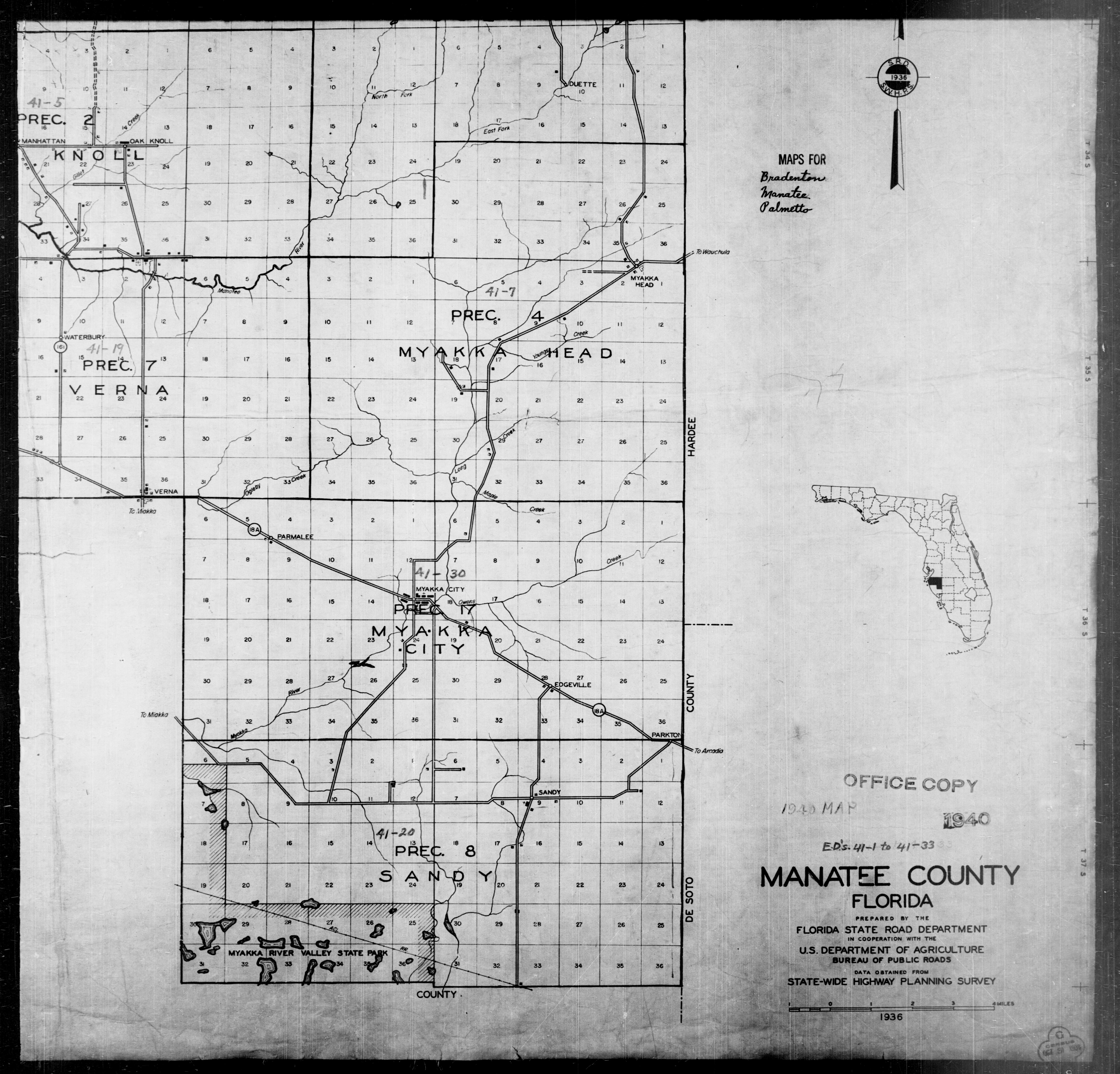
A 1940 US Census enumeration district map showing Myakka City within Manatee County.

== Parks ==
Crane Park is a 27 acre park in Myakka City along the Myakka River.

Myakka Community Park is also in Myakka City and includes a playground, walking trail, softball field, and community center.

== See also ==
- Mayaca (tribe), which uses a variant spelling but is pronounced the same as Myakka
- Port Mayaca, Florida, a settlement on the eastern shore of Lake Okeechobee
- Old Miakka, Florida, Sarasota County
