= Manatee River =

River in Florida, United States

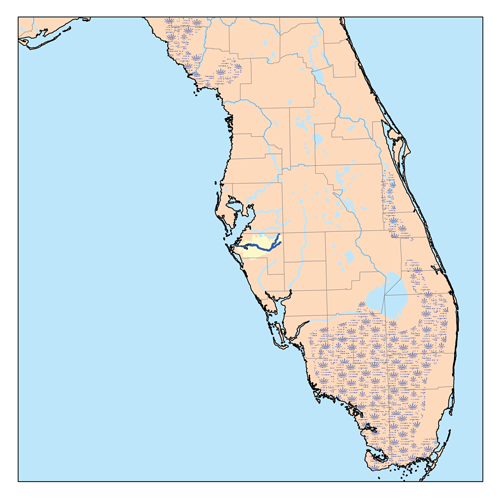
- Map of Manatee River in Florida

- Location of the mouth in Florida

Location
- Country: United States
- State: Florida
- Counties: Manatee
- District: Southwest Florida Water Management District

Physical characteristics
- Source: confluence of the East Fork and North Fork, eastern Manatee County
  - location: Myakka City, Florida
  - coordinates: 27°29′23″N 82°11′35″W
- Mouth: Gulf of Mexico
  - location: Tampa Bay
  - coordinates: 27°31′51″N 82°39′12″W
- Length: 36 miles (58 km)
- Basin size: 360 square miles (930 km^{2})

Basin features
- River system: Manatee River Watershed
- Landmarks: Edward W. Chance Reserve; Lake Manatee State Park; Bradenton Riverwalk; Palmetto Riverside Park; De Soto National Memorial; Emerson Point Preserve; Robinson Preserve
- Waterbodies: Lake Manatee
- Bridges: Fort Hamer Bridge; Trooper JD Young Bridge; Hernando DeSoto Bridge; Green Bridge

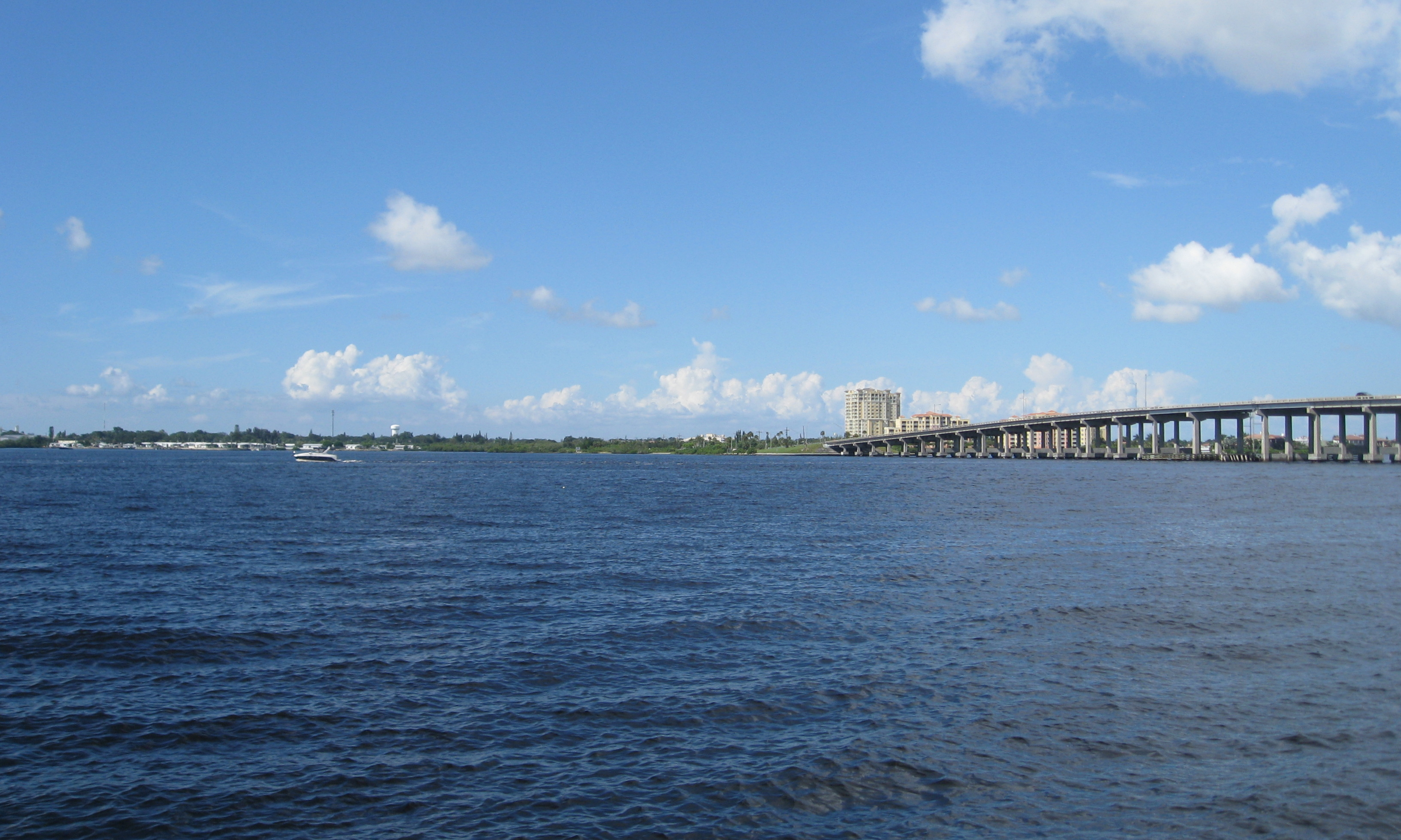
Manatee River with DeSoto Bridge in the background

The Manatee River is a 36-mile-long (58 km) river in Manatee County, Florida. The river forms in the northeastern corner of Manatee County and flows into the Gulf of Mexico at the southern edge of Tampa Bay.

Wildlife in and around the river includes alligators, herons, manatees, dolphins, and fish such as bass, bluegill, catfish, and gar. Bull sharks are occasionally found in the brackish water near its low-lying outlet. The river includes the Upper Manatee River Canoe Trail for paddlers.

== Overview ==
The Manatee River has a watershed that is approximately 362 square miles (940 km^{2}). Lake Manatee, an artificial reservoir, is located about midway in the river's course. The lower part of the river below the dam is an estuary, with Bradenton and smaller settlements located along its banks. The river's main tributary is the Braden River, which runs through the communities of River Club and Lakewood Ranch.

== Watershed ==
The Manatee River watershed lies in the Tampa Bay sector of Manatee County. The watershed covers approximately 360 sq mi (930 km^{2}). The Manatee River headwaters flow 45 mi (72 km) in a westerly direction towards the Gulf of Mexico and southern Tampa Bay. Two major river systems make up the Manatee River Watershed — Braden River and Manatee River. These two rivers have been impounded to create two reservoirs for potable supply — Ward Lake (also known as Bill Evers Reservoir) and Lake Manatee Reservoir. Ward Lake is located upstream on the narrow, winding Braden River. This reservoir, built in the 1930s, covers 255 acres (103 ha) and is responsible for the majority of the water for the city of Bradenton. The Lake Manatee Reservoir is located upstream on the Manatee River. This reservoir, built in 1967, is a 1,174 acres (475 ha) artificial reservoir used as Manatee County's primary water supply.

The Manatee River Watershed has three different physiographic locations: plains, lowlands, and uplands. These locations cause the river to contain areas that are as varied as hardwood swamps, mesic flatwoods, coastal lowlands, and marshes. The highlands include areas with scattered bushes, pine trees, and oak trees. The soil in the highlands tends to be moderately well drained. The marshes and swamps have very poorly drained soil and tend to have water-tolerant grasses. The uplands consist of flatwoods which have poorly drained soils. These areas contain saw palmettos and slash pines.

== Wildlife ==
Wildlife that can be found within the river itself includes manatees, alligators, and various types of fish. The Manatee River Estuary is widely used for commercial fishing. Everything from finfish and invertebrates to bait and food shrimp is harvested from its waters, therefore, many commercial fishing regulations apply. As the name would suggest, there are also many manatees found within the river. These mammals prefer warm water so they move throughout the river towards the warmest areas depending on the season.

Around the Manatee River, many species of birds can be found and some, such as the wood stork are listed as endangered species. A few of the birds are considered threatened such as the snowy plover, bald eagle, Florida scrub-jay, and peregrine falcon. Other common birds that can be seen around the Manatee River include cattle egret, white ibis, great blue heron, and yellow-crowned night heron.

== Human impact ==
Human development has a great impact on the environment of the Manatee River and its watershed. With the increased development of the area surrounding the Manatee River, the water quality within the River has decreased. The use of organic pesticides is a rising fear in the ecological communities. The uprooting of the forested wetlands and uplands has caused excess nutrients to build up in the Bill Evers Reservoir. Also, in both reservoirs there have been increased levels of lead, zinc, and copper.
