= List of botanical gardens and arboretums in Florida =

This list of botanical gardens and arboretums in Florida is intended to include all significant botanical gardens and arboretums in the U.S. state of Florida

Name	Image	Affiliation	City	Coordinates
American Orchid Society Visitors Center and Botanical Garden		American Orchid Society	Delray Beach	26°25′43.68″N 80°9′12.6″W
Arboretum of the University of Central Florida		University of Central Florida	Orlando	28°36′14″N 81°11′35″W
Bok Tower Gardens			Lake Wales	27°56′07.2″N 81°34′39″W
Botanic Gardens at Kona Kai Resort			Key Largo	25°04′39.5″N 80°27′40.7″W
Cummer Museum of Art and Gardens			Jacksonville	30°18′53.8″N 81°40′36.84″W
Cypress Gardens			Winter Haven	27°59′24.41″N 81°41′30.66″W
Deerfield Beach Arboretum			Deerfield Beach	26°19′7.79″N 80°8′29.1″W
Edison and Ford Winter Estates			Fort Myers	26°38′05″N 81°52′48″W
Fairchild Tropical Botanic Garden			Coral Gables	25°40′43″N 80°16′25″W
Flamingo Gardens			Davie	26°04′25″N 80°18′46″W
Florida Botanical Gardens			Largo	27°52′37″N 82°48′32″W
Florida Institute of Technology Botanical Garden		Florida Institute of Technology	Melbourne	28°03′59.9″N 80°37′21.7″W
Four Arts Botanical Gardens		Garden Club of Palm Beach	Palm Beach	26°42′23″N 80°02′32″W
Fruit & Spice Park		Redland	Homestead	25°32′8.16″N 80°29′39.12″W
John C. Gifford Arboretum		University of Miami	Coral Gables	25°43′25.54″N 80°16′49.26″W
Heathcote Botanical Gardens			Fort Pierce	27°25′5.8″N 80°19′26.4″W
Jacksonville Arboretum & Botanical Gardens			Jacksonville	30°20′46.32″N 81°32′22.56″W
Jacksonville Zoo and Gardens			Jacksonville	30°24′14.67″N 81°38′36.04″W
The Kampong		National Tropical Botanical Garden	Coconut Grove, Miami	25°42′53″N 80°14′59″W
Kanapaha Botanical Gardens			Gainesville	29°36′43.92″N 82°24′32.04″W
Key West Tropical Forest & Botanical Garden			Stock Island, Key West	24°34′25″N 81°44′58″W
Harry P. Leu Gardens			Orlando	28°34′2.58″N 81°21′26.36″W
Alfred B. Maclay Gardens State Park			Tallahassee	30°31′08″N 84°15′04″W
McKee Botanical Garden			Vero Beach	27°36′27.36″N 80°22′55.2″W
Mead Botanical Garden			Winter Park	28°35′00″N 81°21′31″W
Miami Beach Botanical Garden			Miami Beach	25°47′44.9″N 80°08′08.5″W
Montgomery Botanical Center			Coral Gables	25°39′40.46″N 80°16′53.8″W
Morikami Museum and Japanese Gardens			Delray Beach	26°25′46″N 80°9′22.4″W
Mounts Botanical Garden			West Palm Beach	26°41′07″N 80°06′49″W
Naples Botanical Garden			Naples	26°6′25.2″N 81°46′15.6″W
Nature Coast Botanical Gardens			Spring Hill	28°27′31″N 82°37′22″W
Ormond Memorial Art Museum and Gardens			Ormond Beach	29°17′22.74″N 81°2′41.82″W
Palm and Cycad Arboretum		Florida Community College	Jacksonville	30°17′29.5″N 81°30′35.49″W
Palma Sola Botanical Park			Bradenton	27°30′48.6″N 82°39′36″W
Peace River Botanical and Sculpture Gardens			Punta Gorda	
Pinecrest Gardens			Pinecrest	25°40′10″N 80°17′9″W
Port St. Lucie Botanical Gardens			Port St. Lucie	27.27006°N 80.31846°W
Roji-en Japanese Gardens		Morikami Museum and Japanese Gardens	Delray Beach	26°25′39.04″N 80°8′50.59″W
Sarasota Jungle Gardens			Sarasota	27°20′14″N 82°32′07″W
Marie Selby Botanical Gardens			Sarasota	27°19′40″N 82°32′25″W
Sunken Gardens			St. Petersburg	27°47′24″N 82°38′18″W
Tree Hill Nature Center			Jacksonville	30°20′0.6″N 81°34′45.12″W
Tropical Ranch Botanical Garden			Stuart	27°05′44″N 80°16′48″W
Unbelievable Acres Botanic Gardens			West Palm Beach	26°41′3.36″N 80°8′33.98″W
University of South Florida Botanical Gardens		University of South Florida	Tampa	28°3′16″N 82°24′47″W
Vizcaya Museum and Gardens			Coconut Grove, Miami	25°44′37″N 80°12′37″W

== See also ==
- List of botanical gardens and arboretums in the United States
