= Tampa Bay Reforestation and Environmental Effort =

Nonprofit environmental organization

- Formation: 1983
- Founder: William Moriaty
- Dissolved: 2023
- Headquarters: Tampa Bay area, Florida, United States
- Members: 60
- Website: http://www.treeinc.org

Tampa Bay Reforestation and Environmental Effort, Inc., or "T.R.E.E. Inc.", was a grassroots nonprofit environmental organization based in the Tampa Bay area from 1983 to 2023. It promoted the practice of volunteers raising and then planting trees along the interstates, roadways, and parks of the greater Tampa Bay area to beautify and preserve the environment. The organization planted over 30,000 trees and palms in its 40-year history.

== History ==
=== Early years 1983–1987 ===
The group formed to plant more trees in the Tampa Bay area. On February 8, 1983, T.R.E.E. Inc. was incorporated under Florida law. T.R.E.E. Inc.'s modus operandi for the first 22 years of their existence was to purchase bare root tree seedlings, grow them in 1-gallon containers for one growing season, step them up into 3-gallon containers for a second growing season, and then donate or out-plant them before their third growing season.

The different kinds of trees that were most commonly used during this period were the genetically improved or superior North Florida slash pine (Pinus elliottii var. "elliottii"). It was selected due to its adaptability, rapid growth, and relative ease of maintenance after establishment. Hardwood trees during that time were typically purchased as 4" potted seedlings. Varieties typically used were sweetgum (Liquidambar styraciflua), Pignut Hickory (Carya glabra), and Loblolly Bay (Gordonia lasianthus).

=== Major program initiatives, 1990–2004 ===
The genetically improved or superior North Florida slash pine began to lose favor to the local indigenous Longleaf Pine (Pinus palustris), "Ocala" Race Sand Pine (Pinus clausa), and South Florida slash pine (Pinus elliottii var. "densa"). The availability of Florida grown bare root hardwood seedlings further broadened the plant palette to include Baldcypress (Taxodium distichum), Tulip Poplar (Liriodendron tulipifera), and southern magnolia (Magnolia grandiflora) as well as dependable stand-bys, sweetgum and Pignut Hickory (Carya glabra).

Due to a major push by members living in Pinellas County, Florida, the organization's name was changed through Florida law on July 24, 1991, from its original title of Tampa Reforestation and Environmental Effort, Inc. to Tampa Bay Reforestation and Environmental Effort, Inc.

On August 9, 1991, T.R.E.E. Inc. was given 501 (c)(3) tax-exempt status from the United States Internal Revenue Service (IRS) as an educational organization.

=== Major programs and milestones 2005–2021 ===
Beginning in 2005, T.R.E.E. Inc. secured its first major sponsor, Esurance. Esurance is an online insurance provider based in San Francisco, California. Beginning with the Esurance St. Pete Beach Tree-Athalon planting on September 24, 2005, T.R.E.E. Inc. had an additional ten volunteer tree plantings sponsored by Esurance.

The Esurance plantings were a departure from T.R.E.E. Inc.'s previous plantings, which were conducted almost solely through the use of 3-gallon material grown at its own nursery. This gave T.R.E.E. Inc. the ability to plant large-sized 30-gallon trees, allowing it to finally conduct plantings with a much higher visual impact. In addition, the Esurance projects led to a gradual phasing out of T.R.E.E. Inc., having to depend so heavily upon its nursery to obtain trees.

In addition to the Esurance plantings, T.R.E.E. Inc. began introducing programs such as the Tulip Poplar Repopulation Program, Orange and Seminole Counties, Florida, where Florida Peninsula Tulip Poplar (Liriodendron tulipifera) grown from the seed of trees native to East Central Florida area had been planted in Orlando, Winter Park, Altamonte Springs, Sanford, and Casselberry, Florida.

Similar programs included the Longleaf Pine Repopulation Program in Temple Terrace, Florida, and the Egmont Key Reforestation Initiative at Egmont Key State Park in Hillsborough County, Florida.

In December 2008, T.R.E.E. Inc. received a major contribution from the Home Depot Foundation and assisted the National Football League's Green Program and Florida Forest Service with a Super Bowl Trail of Trees planting initiative in April 2009 after leading plantings at 18 locations throughout the Tampa Bay area from November 2008 to February 2009, with a major emphasis of the Tampa Bay watershed.

In August 2017, TREE, Inc. created a checklist of the "Trees and Palms of the Hillsborough Community College Botanical Gardens" at the college's Plant City campus. The Garden was originally a Teaching Garden for the University of Florida, at 2001 E. Cherry Street in Plant City.

TREE, Inc. also conducted seven projects related to raising public awareness about the Park Road Outfall/East Canal watershed in Plant City, Florida, which are contributors to the Tampa Bay estuary. These projects included providing educational signing in July 2019 for a wetland located at the outer perimeter of the Plant City, Florida campus of Hillsborough Community College; the planting of native wetland trees within the campus in March 2020 and January 2022; the planting of a Memory Tree at the campus' Botanical Treasure Gardens in September 2020; the planting of 25 Baldcypress trees at Mike E. Sansone Community Park in January 2021, and; the planting of a sweetgum tree along the East Canal at Gilchrist Park on Earth Day 2021 (April 22, 2021) - - that planting was a part of the Hillsborough 100 Conservation Challenge sponsored by the Hillsborough Soil and Water Conservation District and planted by Future Farmers of America students from Tomlin Middle School and Plant City High School in Plant City, Florida. Additional plantings along the Park Road Outfall on the campus grounds were also performed in February and December 2022, and December 2023.

On May 18, 2020, a new logo for the organization was adopted, replacing the pine and oak rendition logo that had been used since 1983.

=== Dissolution ===
After 40 years of planting trees, educating the public on the value of planting them, highlighting the need for diverse forests, and placing great emphasis on the preservation and enhancement of Florida's natural communities, T.R.E.E. Inc. voted on October 7, 2023 to dissolve the Corporation and merge in to the TakeMAR organization, effective January 1, 2024. T.R.E.E.'s final project occurred on December 11, 2023 at the University of South Florida Botanical Gardens in Tampa.

== Accomplishments ==
T.R.E.E. Inc. has over the past 40 years:

- Conducted 638 projects.
- Furnished the original design, and subsequent installation on November 23, 1996, of what would become the Richard T. Bowers Historic Tree Grove at the Museum of Science and Industry (Tampa).
- With the permission of the Florida Department of Transportation, made history by planting over 4,600 native trees in ten (10) TREE DAY on I-75 projects along Interstate 75 in Hillsborough County, Florida from 1986 to 1996.
- Donated and planted approximately 31,181 trees and palms, utilizing an estimated 3,500 volunteers since T.R.E.E. Inc.'s creation on February 8, 1983.
- Assisted in a joint tree planting effort with the National Football League and Florida Division of Forestry consisting of over 20 projects in the Greater Tampa Bay Area for Super Bowl XLIII.
- Worked in conjunction with the City of St. Petersburg, Florida and Keep Pinellas Beautiful to reforest and beautify Clam Bayou Nature Preserve, with the First Phase of this effort starting on May 5, 2018, and a Second Phase having been conducted on October 27, 2018. Work with the same partners occurred on August 24, 2019, with the planting of South Florida slash pines at the Boyd Hill Nature Preserve, with plans to continue tree plantings at the Preserve over the coming years.
- Partnered with the City of Tampa, Florida, the Florida Aquarium and Keep Tampa Bay Beautiful, Inc. to conduct a Picnic Island Riparian Planting Initiative. The first Phase consisted of the planting of 400 Red Mangrove (Rhizophora mangle) propagules on April 27, 2019. The second Phase occurred on November 2, 2019, consisting of the removal of invasive exotic plants and the planting of over 500 Florida native trees, consisting of 14 varieties. A third Phase was conducted on April 24, 2021, and consisted of the planting of 150 Red Mangroves propagules, 10 Sea Grapes, 15 Silver Buttonwoods, and 27 Muhly Grass.
- Was a partner with the Hillsborough Soil and Water Conservation District, Rotary International, Sustany Foundation, and Hillsborough Conservation and Environmental Lands Management in the planting of 20,000 Longleaf Pine tubelings at the Lower Green Swamp Preserve in Hillsborough County, Florida on June 12, 2021.
- Was the 2022-2023 recipient of Cherrylake Nursery's "1,000 Trees for 1,000 Years" planting initiative, installing Baldcypress trees at seven locations throughout the Tampa Bay area, beginning with a retention pond in Seminole, Florida on December 3, 2022, and ending at the Little Manatee River Corridor Nature Preserve in Wimauma, Florida.
- Created a Florida Indigenous Peoples Garden concept to be used by its successor, the TakeMAR (https://www.takemar.org/) organization. If approved by a participating entity, the Garden would educate the public about Florida's Indian tribes, the languages that they spoke, replication of a Tocobaga Indian village, and emphasis on the ethnobotany between that West Central Florida tribe and the area's native flora.
