= Tropical Ranch Botanical Garden =

Botanical garden in Stuart, Florida

- Tropical Wedding Venue
- Location within Florida
- Type: Botanical garden
- Location: Stuart, Florida
- Coordinates: 27°05′44″N 80°16′48″W
- Opened: May 2006
- Owner: Jim Haines and Diane Rexroad
- Open: open for private tours, available to groups and organizations for a small charge by appointment
- Website: tropicalweddingvenue.com

Tropical Ranch Botanical Garden is a small botanical garden located at 1905 SW Ranch Trail, in Stuart, Florida. It is the only botanical garden in Martin County, and is open for private tours. The gardens are also available to groups and organizations for a small charge by appointment. They are located on the property of Diane Rexroad and Jim Haines, the founders and current owners and operators of the garden.

== History ==
The gardens opened to the public in May 2006, in accordance with the University of Florida's Florida Friendly Landscaping Program, to educate people in home landscaping and horticulture.

Rexroad and Haines manage the garden by using environmentally friendly practices such as fertilizing, mulching, attracting wildlife, controlling yard pests with integrated pest management strategies, water conservation, and reducing stormwater runoff.

Tropical Ranch Botanical Garden has nine themed garden areas, each with distinctive plant specimens and landscaping styles. The gardens are maintained by the owners and a staff of volunteers.

== See also ==
- List of botanical gardens and arboretums in Florida
- List of botanical gardens and arboretums in the United States
