= Palma Sola, Florida =

- Unincorporated community
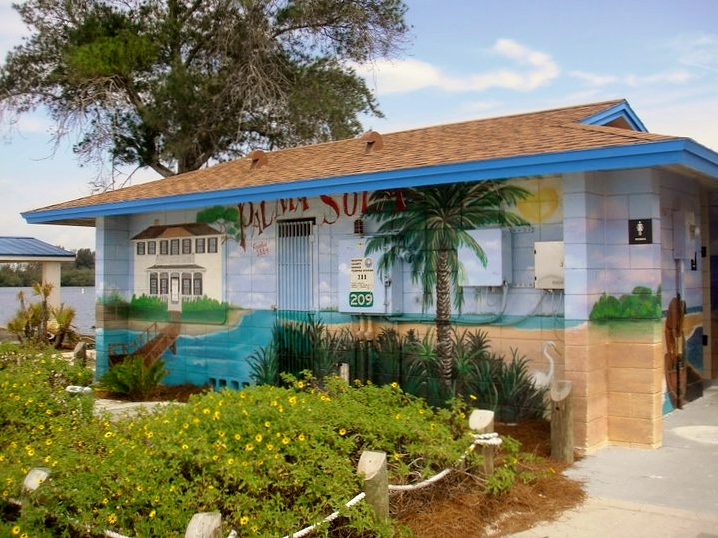
- Palma Sola Park

- Location within Florida Location within the United States
- Coordinates: 27°30′44″N 82°37′55″W
- Country: United States
- State: Florida
- County: Manatee
- Settled: 1868
- Platted: 1880
- Named for: A lone palm tree

Palma Sola is an unincorporated area of Manatee County, Florida, United States. The botanical garden in Bradenton, Florida is known as the Palma Sola Botanical Garden.

== History ==
In 1868 a firearms manufacturer named James Warner along with his family moved from Springfield, Massachusetts to Manatee County. He made his home along the Manatee River but ended up dying a year after moving. His son Warburton S. Warner would end up creating a town called Palma Sola in 1884 on part of the family's homestead. It got its name from a "single tall date palm that dominated the skyline on Snead Island" located directly across the river from McNeill Point where the center of town was located at.

A sawmill would be built in 1884 at what was the center of town at McNeill Point. When the sawmill burned down, the town started to decline. The town was also known for the Palma Sola Hotel and general store which was known as the biggest general store between Cedar Key and Key West.

== Demographics ==
As of the first census for the town in 1880 it had a population of 962.

== Notable people ==
- Jennie Kidd Trout, first licensed female doctor in Canada.
