= Lake Maggiore (Florida) =

Lake in St. Petersburg, Florida, United States

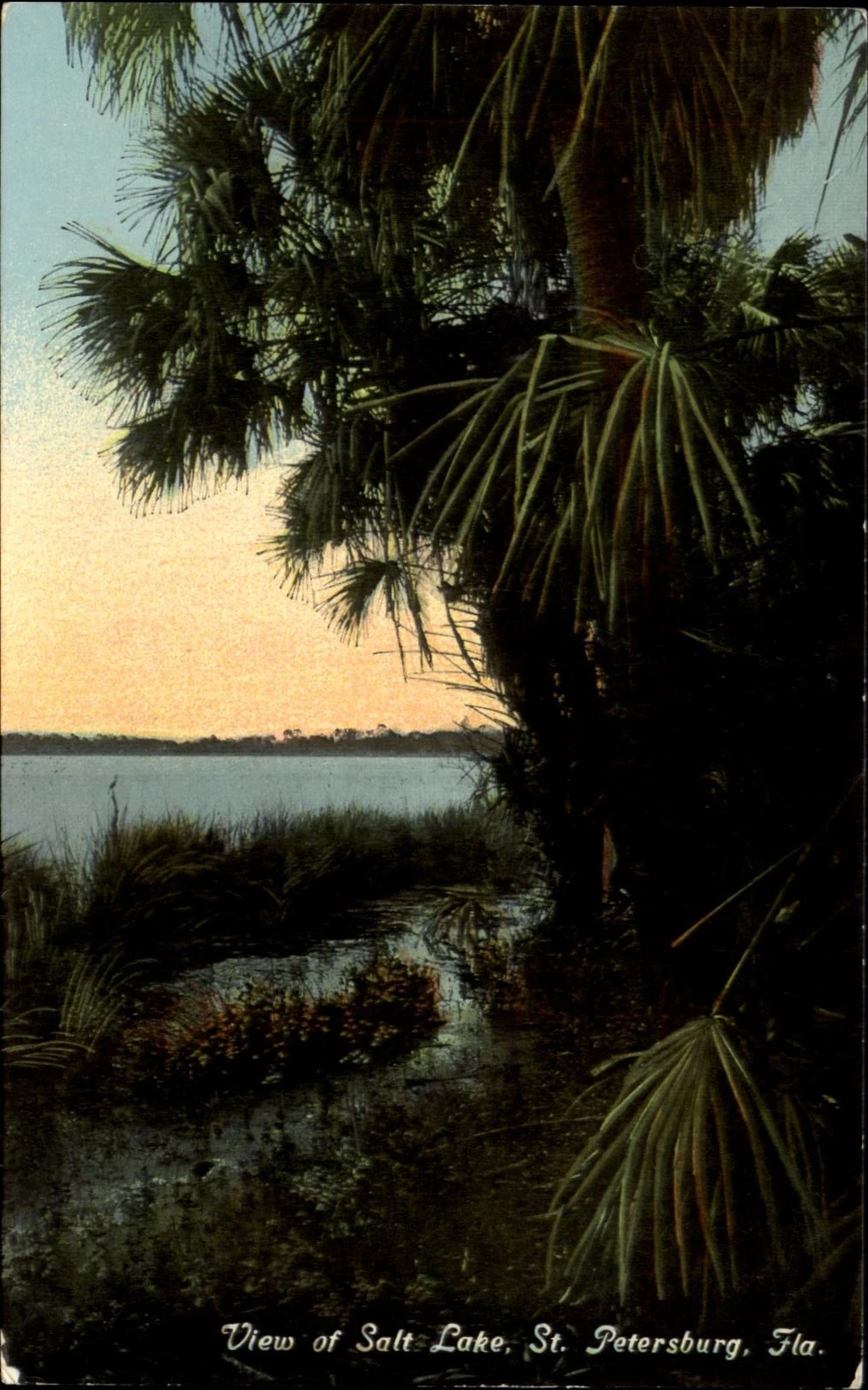
- Postcard view of "Salt Lake" in St. Petersburg, Florida, c. 1910
- Interactive map of Lake Maggiore
- Location: St. Petersburg, Florida, United States
- Coordinates: 27.735°N 82.640°W
- Type: Freshwater lake (formerly estuarine)
- Primary outflows: Salt Creek
- Basin countries: United States
- Surface area: 363 acres (1.47 km^{2})

Lake Maggiore is a freshwater lake in southern St. Petersburg, Florida, United States. Covering approximately 363 acres, it is one of the largest lakes in the city and lies within the Salt Creek watershed. The lake was historically a tidal estuarine system connected to Tampa Bay and was originally known as Salt Lake.

== History ==
=== Early history and "Salt Lake" ===
Prior to urban development, Lake Maggiore functioned as a brackish tidal lagoon connected to Tampa Bay via Salt Creek. The lake was historically known as Salt Lake, a name used by early settlers in the late 19th century.

Historical accounts describe the lake as influenced by tides, with water levels that could drain toward Tampa Bay during low tide.

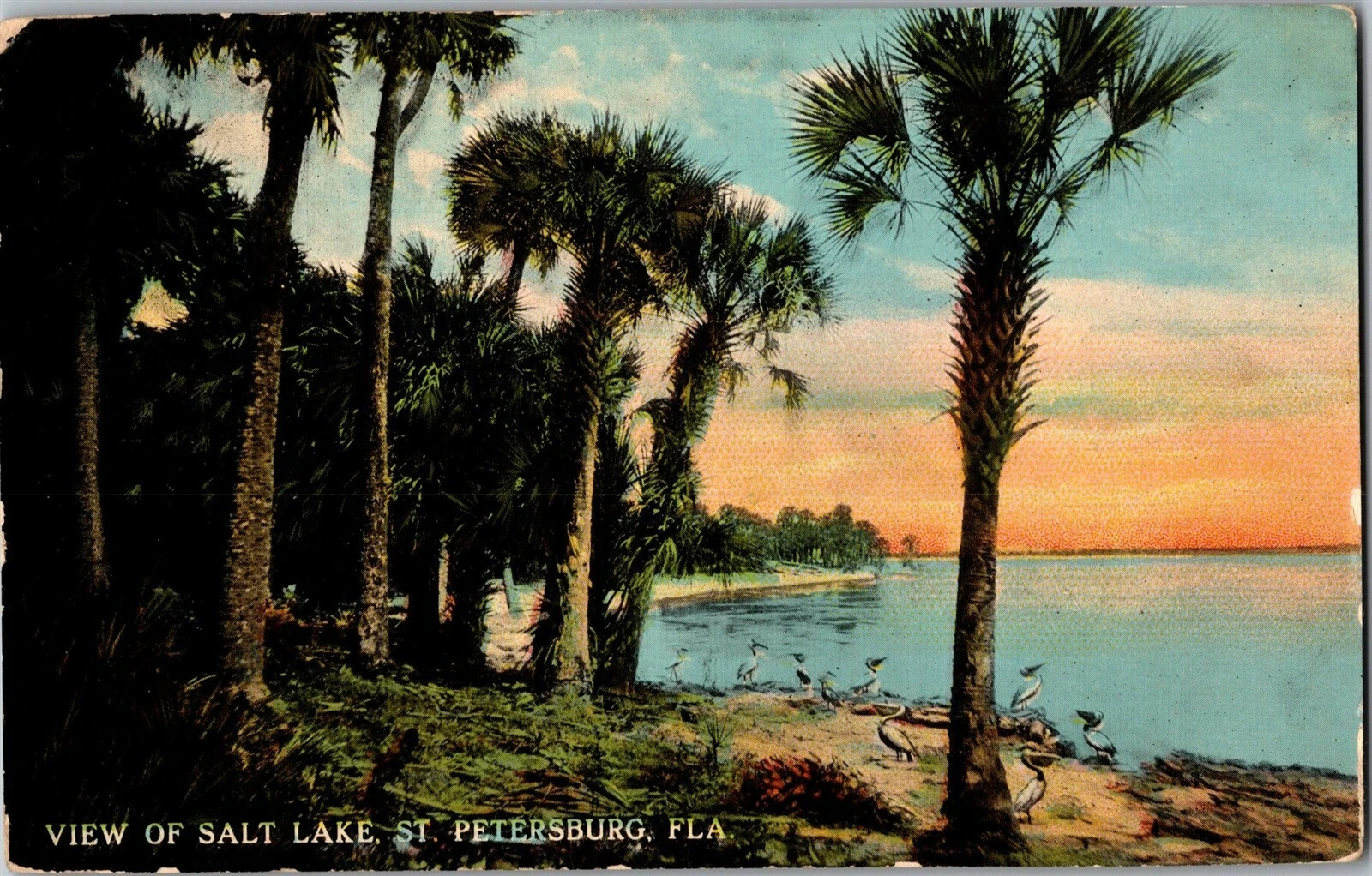
Panoramic postcard view of "Salt Lake", 1914.

Early 20th-century postcard views, including a 1914 panoramic image, depict the shoreline as largely undeveloped, with natural banks and minimal built infrastructure. These images were part of broader promotional efforts during the development of St. Petersburg, Florida, emphasizing the area's natural scenery.

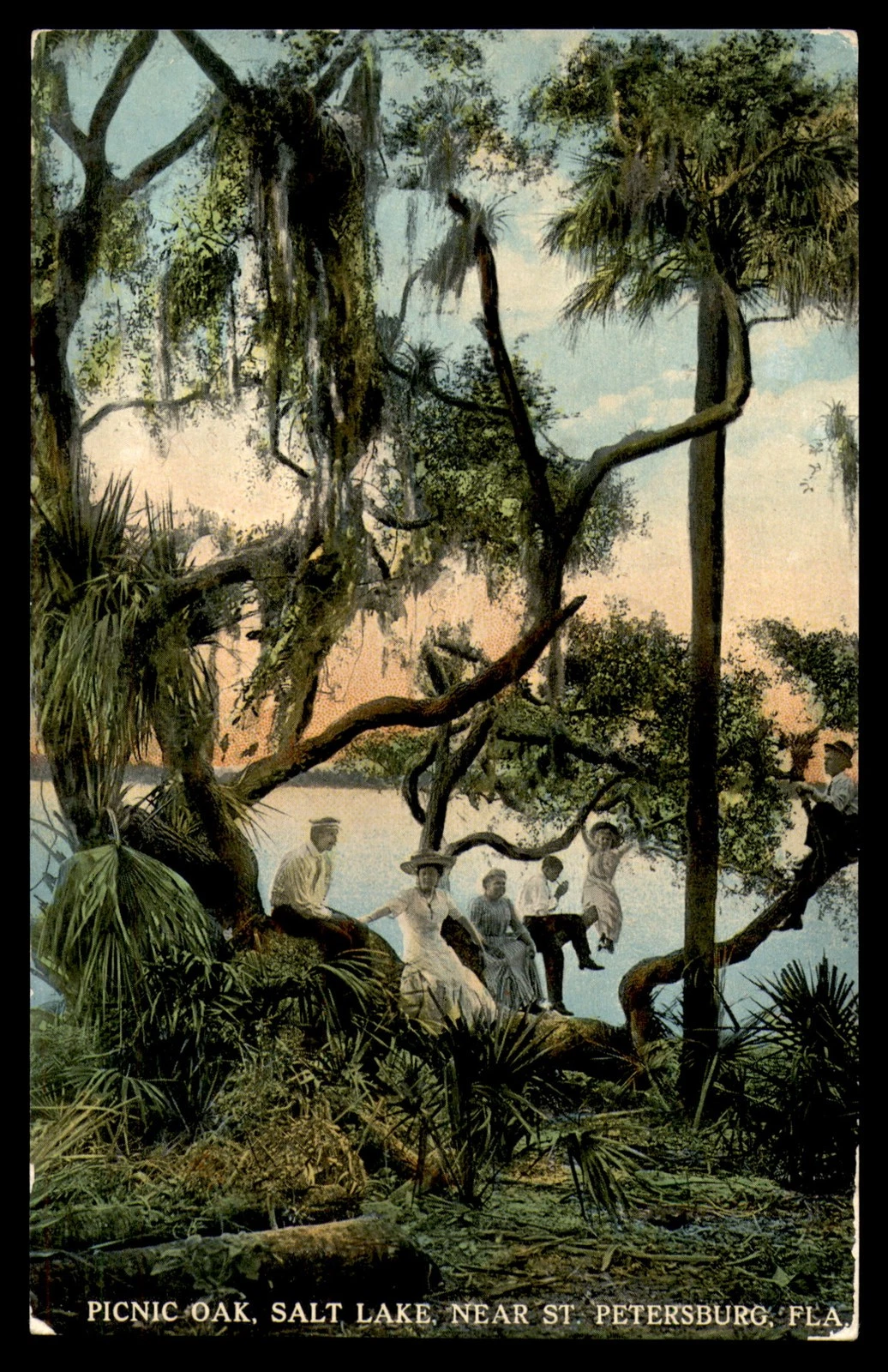
Family at the "Picnic Oak" along Salt Lake, 1913.

Photographs from this period also show the lake as a site of informal recreation and social gathering. A 1913 image of a family at a location known as the "Picnic Oak" indicates that specific natural features along the shoreline served as local landmarks and gathering places.

=== Renaming and development ===
The name Lake Maggiore was adopted in the early 20th century, likely after Lake Maggiore in Italy and Switzerland. The renaming reflected a broader trend in St. Petersburg, Florida of using European-themed names to promote real estate development during the Florida land boom.

=== Engineering and hydrological changes ===
Lake Maggiore was extensively altered by drainage and flood-control projects in the 20th century. A dam constructed in 1940 near 9th Street South (now Dr. Martin Luther King Jr. Street) severed the lake’s tidal connection to Tampa Bay, converting it into a managed freshwater system.

The impoundment of Salt Creek to form Lake Maggiore is identified in regional planning documents as a significant alteration of natural habitats within the Tampa Bay watershed.

=== Environmental decline ===
By the mid- to late 20th century, Lake Maggiore experienced environmental degradation due to urban runoff and its role in the stormwater system. Reported impacts included declining water quality, algal blooms, and fish kills.

Sediment and environmental monitoring studies have documented nutrient loading and anoxic conditions in the lake.

=== Restoration and modern use ===
From the late 20th century into the 21st century, restoration efforts have focused on improving water quality and ecological conditions. Projects have included dredging, stormwater treatment, and habitat restoration.

Today, Lake Maggiore serves as both a recreational resource and an important component of the city’s stormwater management system.

== Recreation and education ==
Lake Maggiore is bordered by Boyd Hill Nature Preserve, a 245-acre nature preserve operated by the City of St. Petersburg. The preserve provides environmental education programs and public access to the lake through trails and boardwalks.

Historically, Boyd Hill included a small zoo and wildlife attraction during the mid-20th century, which was later phased out as the site transitioned toward conservation and environmental education.

The preserve is now known for its raptor rehabilitation and education program, which houses non-releasable birds of prey such as hawks, owls, and eagles. These birds are used in educational programming and public events, including the annual Raptor Fest.

== See also ==
- Boyd Hill Nature Preserve
- Salt Creek
- Tampa Bay
