= Naples Botanical Garden =

Botanical garden in Naples, Florida

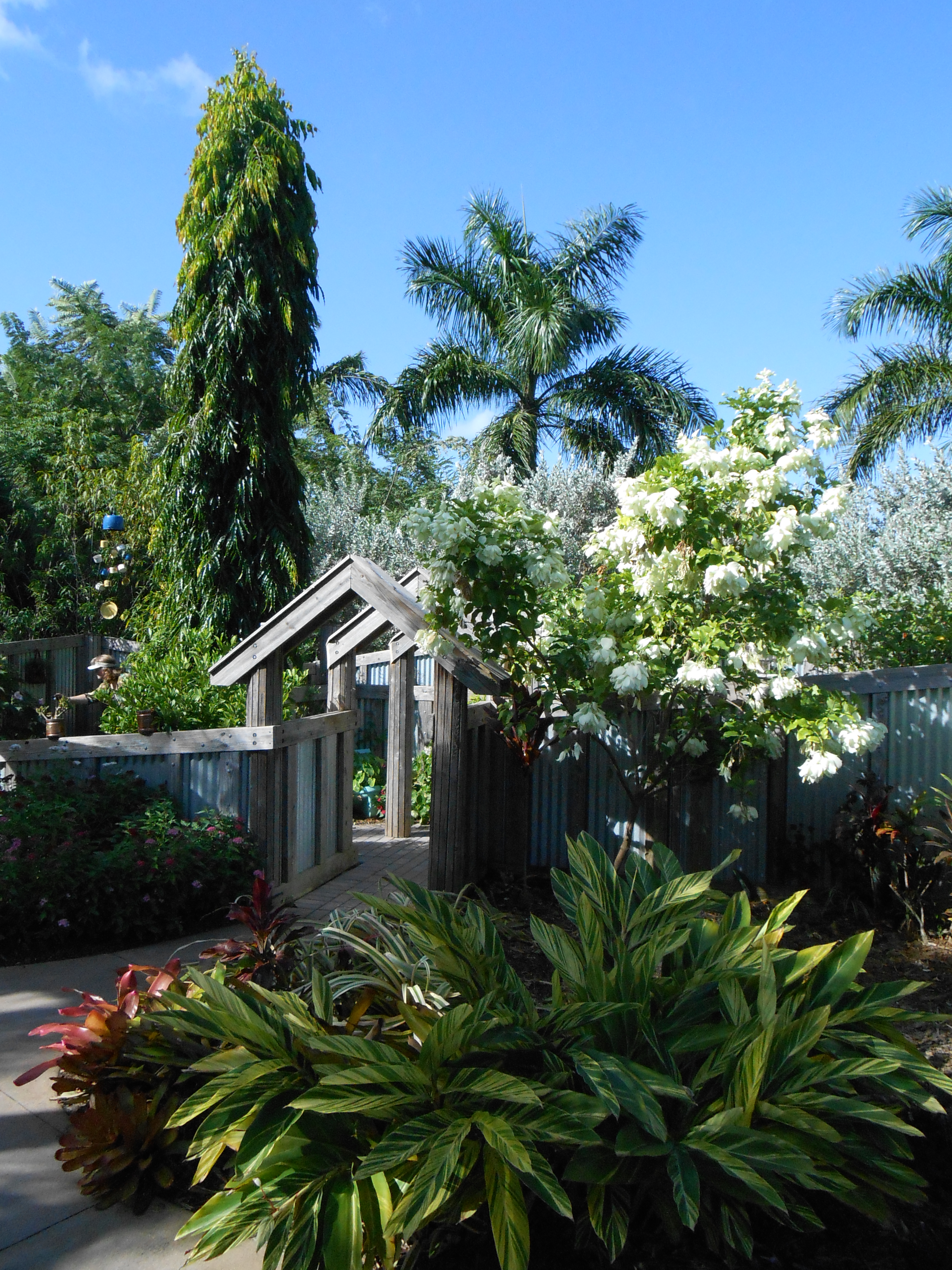
- Interactive map of Naples Botanical Garden
- Type: Botanical garden
- Location: Naples, Florida
- Coordinates: 26.107°N 81.771°W
- Area: 170 acres (69 ha)
- Created: 1993
- Website: www.naplesgarden.org

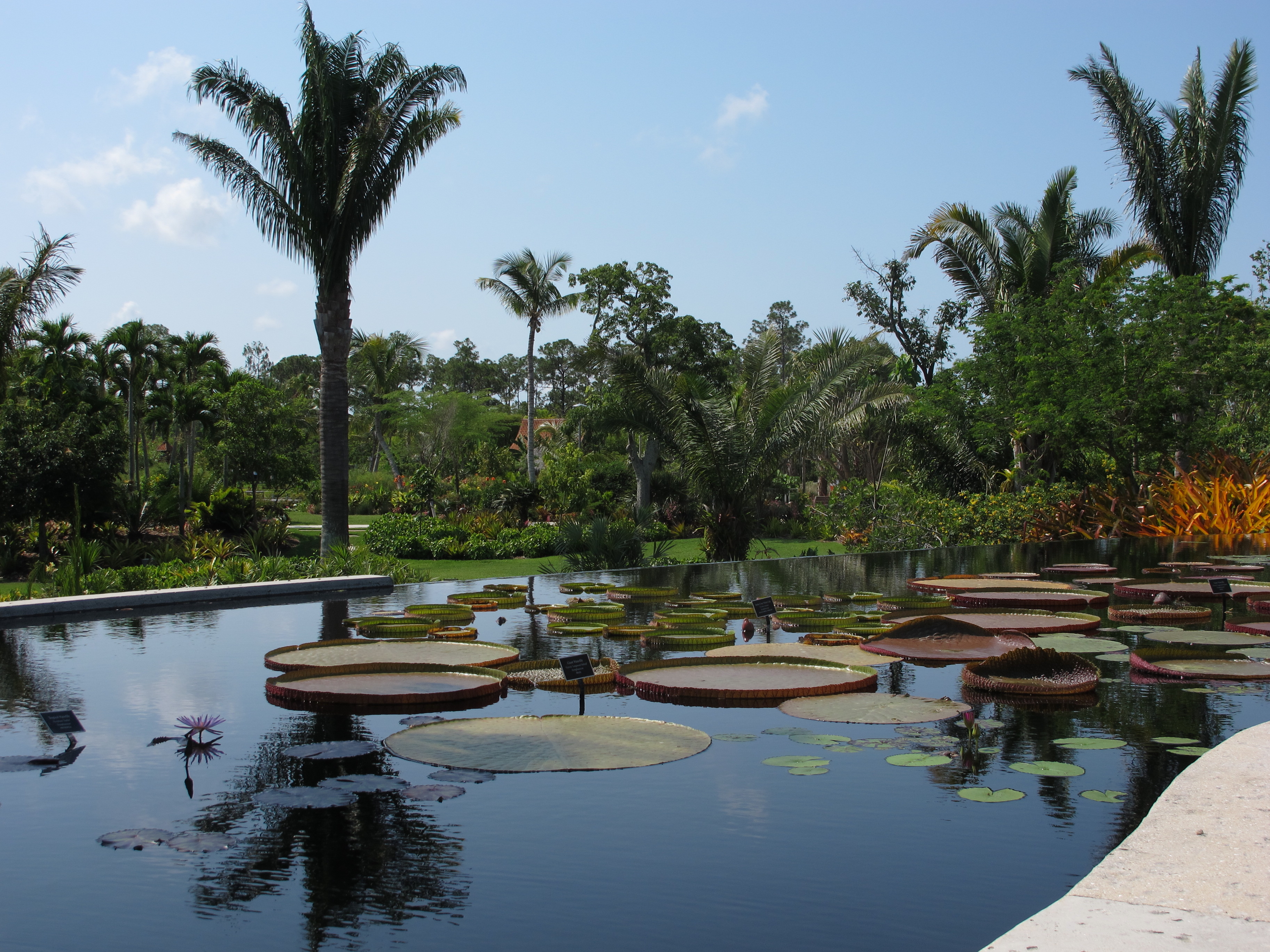
Infinity pool at the Burle Marx Plaza in the Brazilian garden

Naples Botanical Garden is a 170-acre (69 ha) botanical garden located in Naples, Florida. As of 2025, the garden contains around 50,000 different plants. It is also the youngest garden to receive the Award for Garden Excellence from the American Public Gardens Association back in 2017.

== History ==
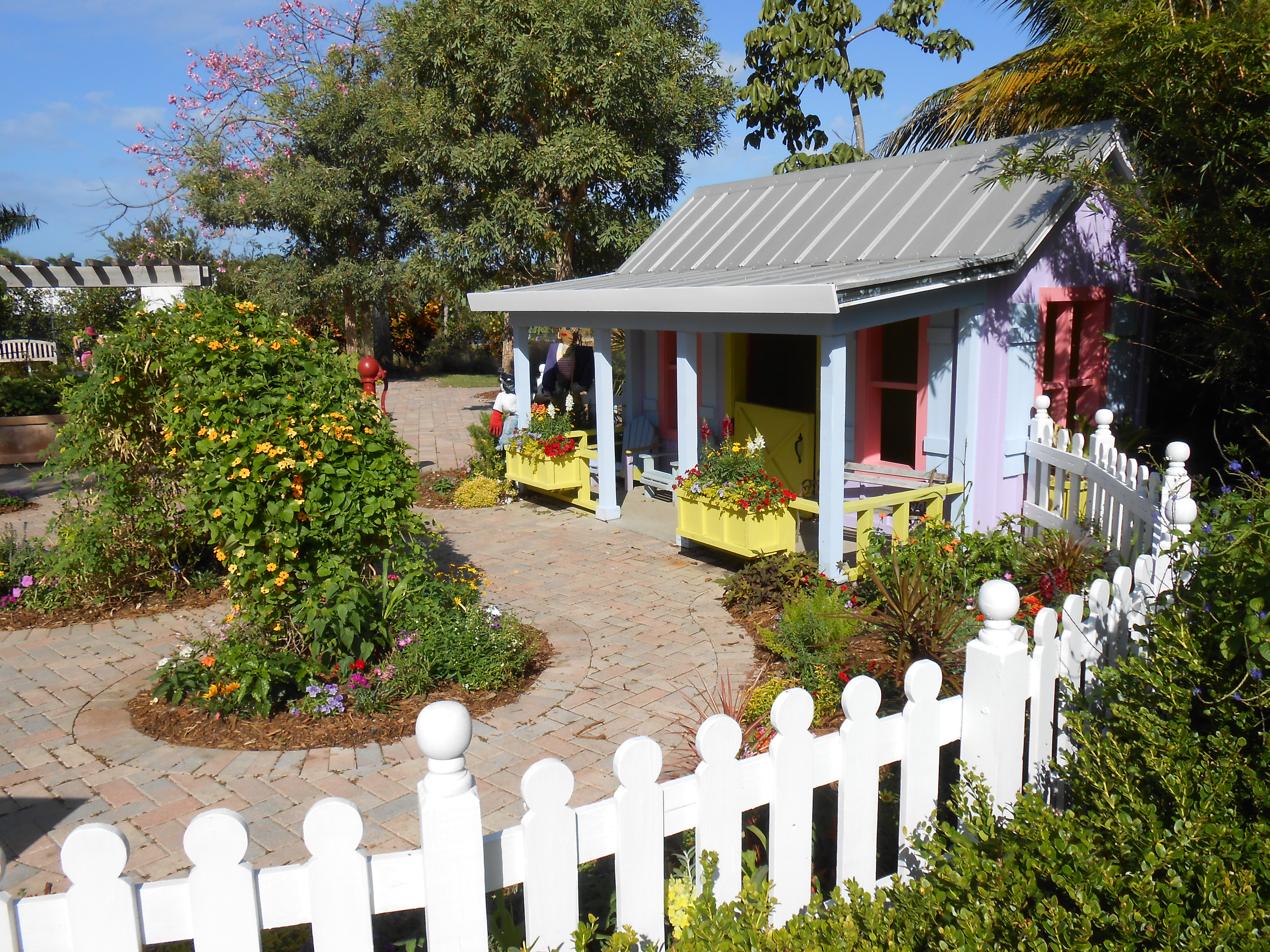
Nov 2013 Naples Botanical Gardens

The botanical garden was founded in 1993 and consists of 170 acres of cultivated gardens and preservation land, representing seven distinct natural habitats and ecosystems, and featuring over 1000 species, with special emphasis on the ecosystems between the 26th parallel north and the 26th parallel south.

== Executive staff ==
The following are the executive staff from the Naples Botanical Garden.

- Carl Crosetto - Interim President & CEO
- Liz Carver - Vice President and Chief People Officer
- Gavin Cooke - Vice President of Facility Operations
- Brian Galligan - Vice President of Horticulture
- Kara Laufer - Vice President of Marketing and Business Development
- Rhea Merrill - Vice President & Chief Strategic and Philanthropic Officer
- Britt Patterson-Weber - Interim Deputy CEO, Vice President of Education & Interpretation
- Brian Scheall - Vice President & Chief Financial Officer
- Chad Washburn - Vice President of Conservation

== Programs for Lifelong Learning ==
The Naples Botanical Garden has multiple programs promoting life-long learning for children and families.

Some of the programs they offer are:

- W.O.N.D.E.R.
- Garden Workshops (Dig Deeper, Birding in the Garden, etc.)
- Activity Packets
- Meet Me In The Garden
- Nature Journaling

=== W.O.N.D.E.R. ===
The Garden offers creative art programs that families can register for throughout the month that combine nature and art. The Garden encourages families to walk, observe, navigate, draw, explore, and read (W.O.N.D.E.R.), from Fridays to Mondays from 10 am to 12 pm. There are W.O.N.D.E.R activity packets available in multiple languages that can be picked up at the gardens activity center and at home learning activities for children available online.

=== Garden Workshops ===
The garden provides garden workshops for adult learners exploring nature journaling, daily 45-minute tours, and two other programs: Dig Deeper and Birding in the Garden. Dig Deeper is an interactive drop-in program that takes place 11:30 am – 12 pm and 1 – 1:30 pm daily where visitors learn a new skill, ask questions, and gain insight. Birding in the Garden allows visitors to participate in a weekly 90-minute walk on Tuesday from 8 – 10 am with volunteer guides. The garden's website also has DIY gardening activities available for adults.

=== Meet Me In The Garden ===
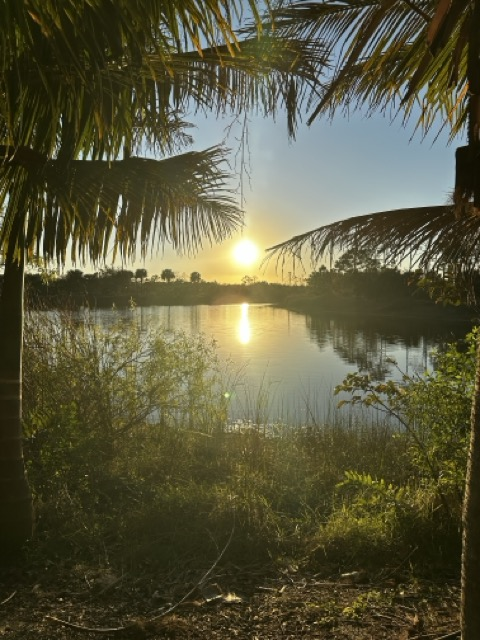
February 2026 sunset at Naples Botanical Garden

Meet Me In The Garden, a program designed to reconnect those with memory impairments and their care partners to nature and its senses. It is designed to be a therapeutic horticulture program, developed with the Naples-based Alzheimer’s Support Network.

== See also ==
- List of botanical gardens and arboretums in Florida
