= Mounts Botanical Garden =

Botanical garden in West Palm Beach, Florida

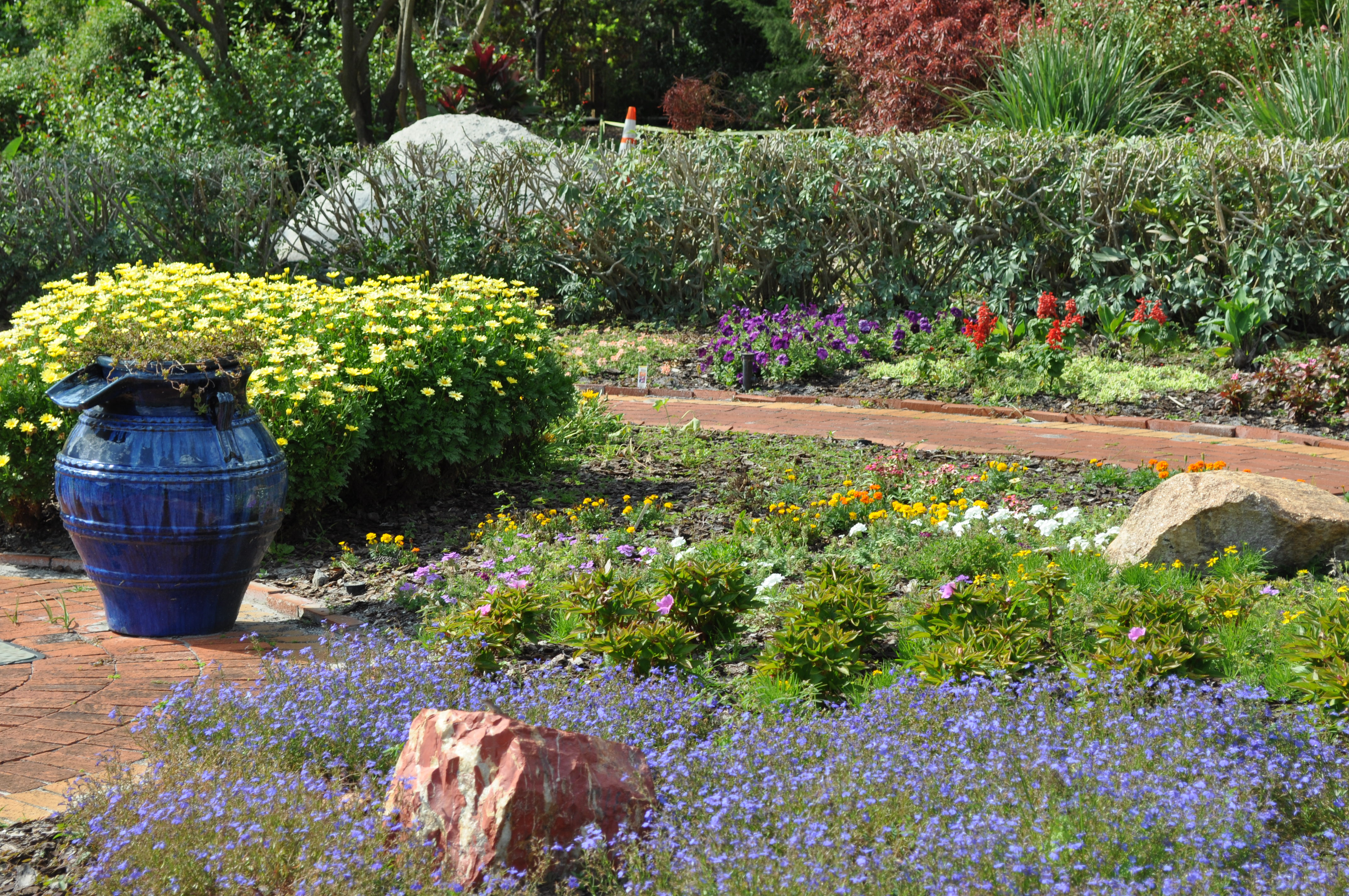
- Mounts Botanical Garden in West Palm Beach, Florida

- Location within Florida
- Type: Botanical
- Location: 531 North Military Trail; West Palm Beach, Florida
- Coordinates: 26°41′07″N 80°06′49″W
- Area: 20 acres (8.1 ha)
- Opened: 1954
- Owner: Palm Beach County Cooperative Extension Service
- Website: Mounts.org

Mounts Botanical Garden is a botanical garden located in West Palm Beach, Florida, United States. It is Palm Beach County's oldest and largest public garden, with over 7,000 species of tropical and subtropical plants from six continents, including plants native to Florida, exotic trees, tropical fruit, herbs, citrus and palms. Mounts Botanical is part of the Palm Beach County Cooperative Extension Department, in partnership with the University of Florida / IFAS and the nonprofit Friends of the Mounts Botanical Garden, Inc.

== History ==
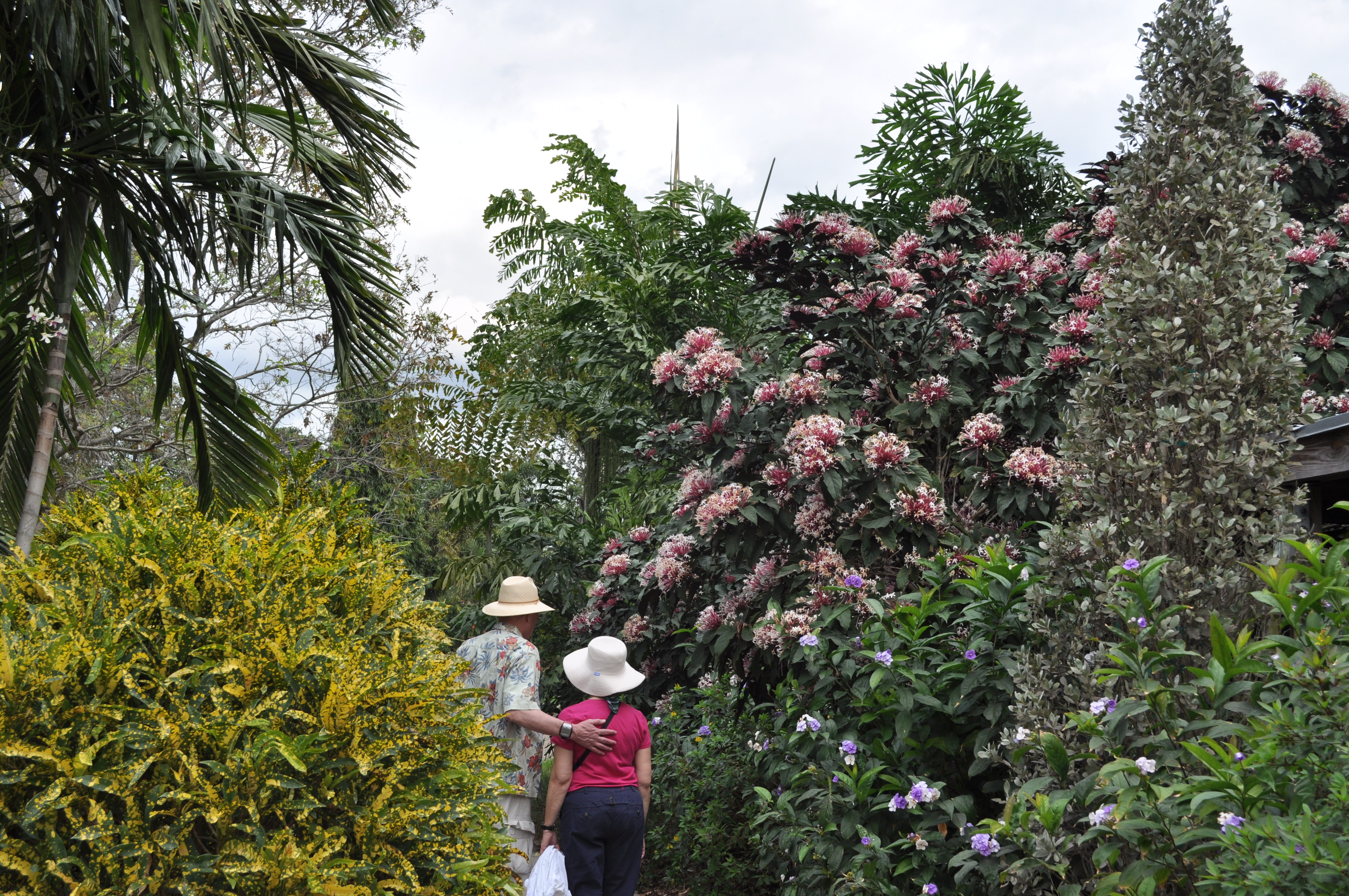
Mature tropical plants and trees adorn the mile long meandering route through the garden.

Botanical plantings began shortly after the Mounts Building was built and opened in 1954. Then-Palm Beach County Cooperative Extension Director Marvin Mounts wanted to create a tropical fruit tree arboretum on the adjacent three acres. This vision was never realized, but many tropical fruits were planted, and a few remain to this day.

In 1975, Clayton Hutcheson, Palm Beach County Cooperative Extension Director, envisioned creating a Horticultural Learning Center on the three acres surrounding the Mounts Building, which housed the Extension Service. This initiative was successfully supported by many local plant-focused organizations and volunteers and was created in 1983. Today’s Garden was formed by a public-private partnership of Palm Beach County and the Friends of Mounts Horticultural Learning Center in 1985. Ten additional acres were added to the property in 1985, bringing the total acreage to fourteen. In 1986, the Friends voted to officially change the name to Mounts Botanical Garden to better understand the organization and its mission-driven purpose.

In 2004, the Friends funded a research grant to the University of Florida to produce a Master Plan to guide the Garden’s future development. During 2004 and 2005, Hurricanes Frances, Jeanne and Wilma destroyed 70% of the property’s mature tree canopy and virtually shattered the original Garden. Since 2006, The Friends and Palm Beach County have restored both the lost tree canopy and the Garden.

Windows on the Floating World – Blume Tropical Wetland Garden officially opened on June 18, 2017. Designed by artists Mags Harries and Lajos Héder in collaboration with WGI's landscape architecture division, it features open-gridded, 4-foot wide walkways on the surface of the wetlands to give visitors the feeling of "walking on water." Within these walks are four “windows” planted with aquatics and changed out with rotating and seasonal botanical exhibits growing from submerged containers.

The Garden of Tranquility was opened in the Spring of 2018. In an artistic Asian-inspired fashion, this serene garden experience was created by natural elements of stone, wood (bamboo), and living plant materials. The garden simulates a Zen-like garden, although it is not meant to be authentic or of strictly Japanese elements.

As of 2024, the garden covered 20 acres (8.1 ha), with 25 display gardens containing more than 7,000 species of tropical and sub-tropical plants.

== Gardens ==
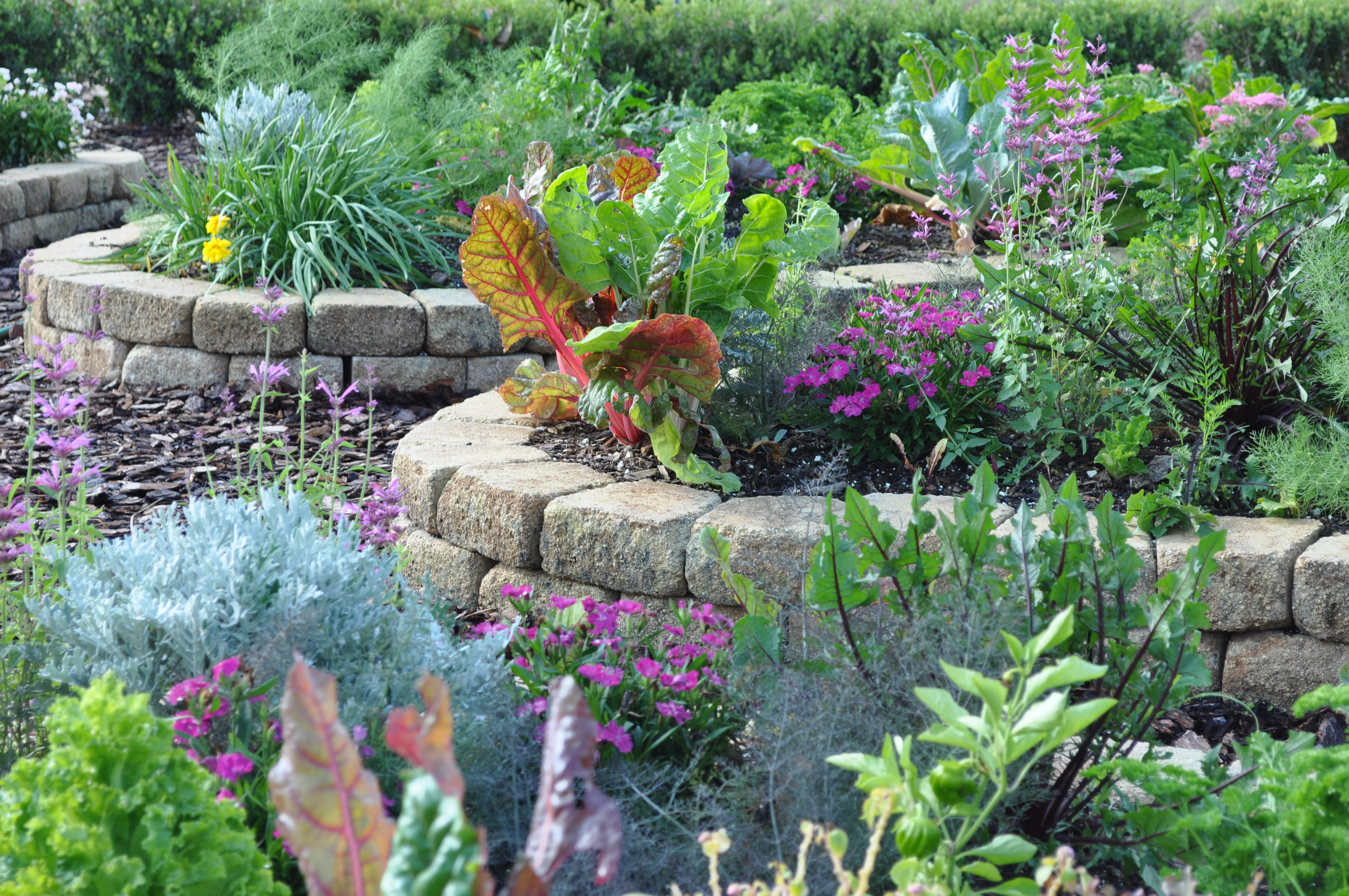
The Edible Gardens contain dooryard tropical fruit trees, vegetables, herbs and consumable flowers.

- Butterfly Garden, has a dozen or so different species of butterflies at any given time
- Rainbow Garden, arranged in a spectrum of color hues, this full sun garden showcases a wide variety of plants that grow well in Palm Beach County
- Dry Stream Bed, allows water a cleansing path flowing through the landscape
- Edible Garden, offers a wide variety of tropical fruits, seasonal vegetables, flowers and herbs that can be grown in South Florida
- Herb Garden of Well Being, showcases plants which have been used in foods, cosmetics, teas, medicines, dyes, ceremonies, and folk remedies
- Tropical Foliage Border, non-woody tropicals in two gently curving borders reliant on foliage color have a visual impact that lasts year-round
- Garden of Extremes, features plants and materials often unique to extremes such as light and weather conditions
- Rose and Fragrance Garden, pleases the eye while fragrance adds another level of indulgence
- Zimmerman Color and Shade Island, provides color in the shade through foliage, diverse texture, and flowers
- Tropical Forest, lush foliage and ferns provide a feeling of a tropical forest, outdoor or living conservatory
- Tropical Cottage Garden, traditional elements include an abundance of colorful flowering perennials, annuals and vines, cascading over arbors and trellises
- Begonia Garden, highlights this popular plant which grows in the tropics along edges of forests or river banks
- Florida Native Plant Garden, comprises a Native Plant Initiative demonstrating the wide variety of plants native to South Florida in a traditional, easy-to-understand landscape design
- Mediterranean Garden, shows how to successfully grow Mediterranean plants or reasonable substitutes that will thrive in the South Florida climate
- O'Keeffe Rain Garden, demonstrates how the quality of all runoff water in the region can be improved
- Trial Garden, evaluates plants for how well they will perform for the average gardener or landscape
- The Pines
- Signature Ridge
- Children's Maze
- Gazebo Garden, covered in dappled shade, foliage, and flower color, the setting for many of the weddings held in the Garden
- Garden of Tranquility, peaceful zen inspired sun garden
- Windows on the Floating World, transports visitors to a unique water garden, complete with seasonal water plants and waterfalls
- Ribbit the Exhibit II, a 2004–2005 exhibit of whimsical frog sculptures displayed throughout the Gardens
- Moai at Mounts Botanical, an ongoing exhibit and gift from Margaret Blume

== Gallery ==
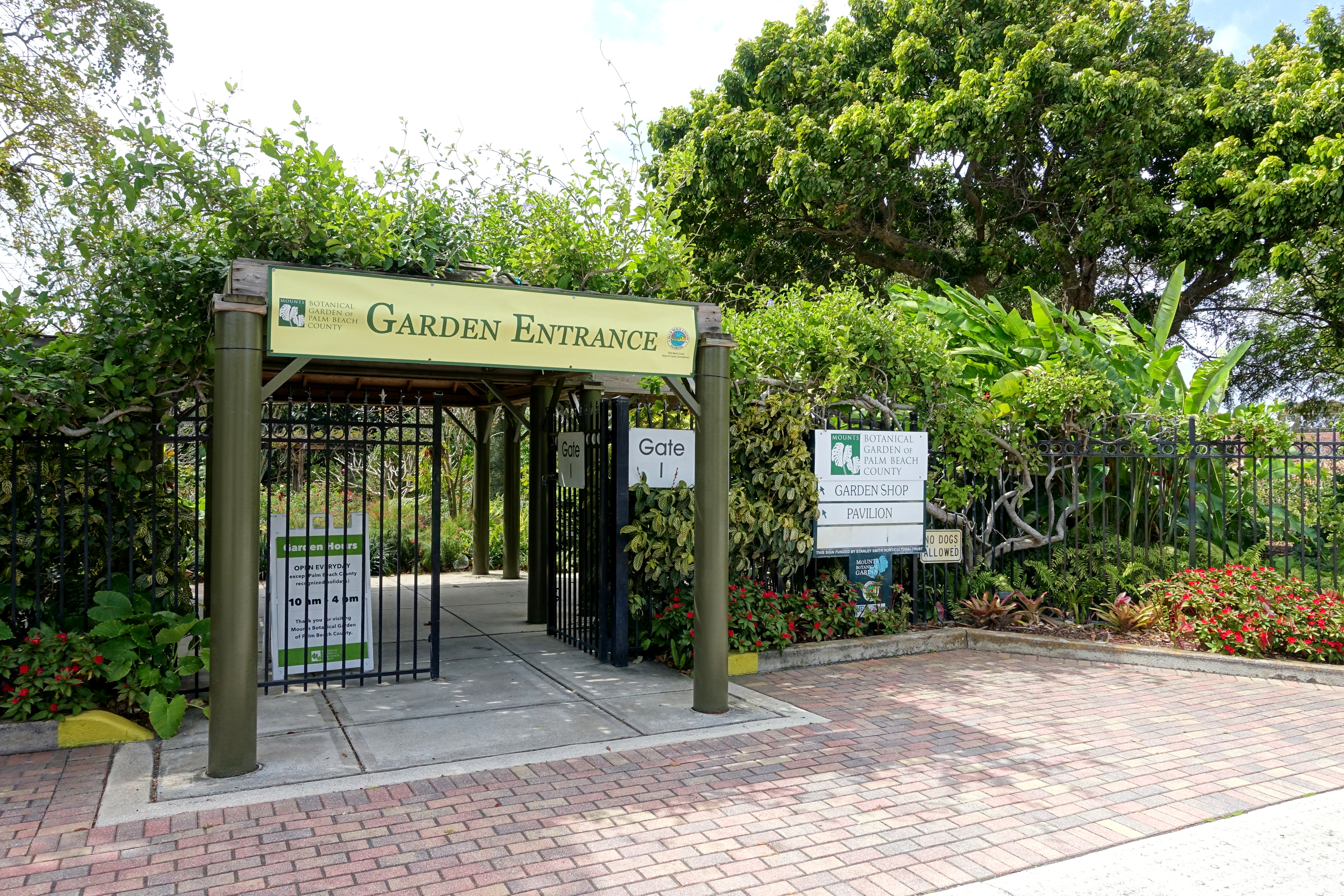
Garden entrance

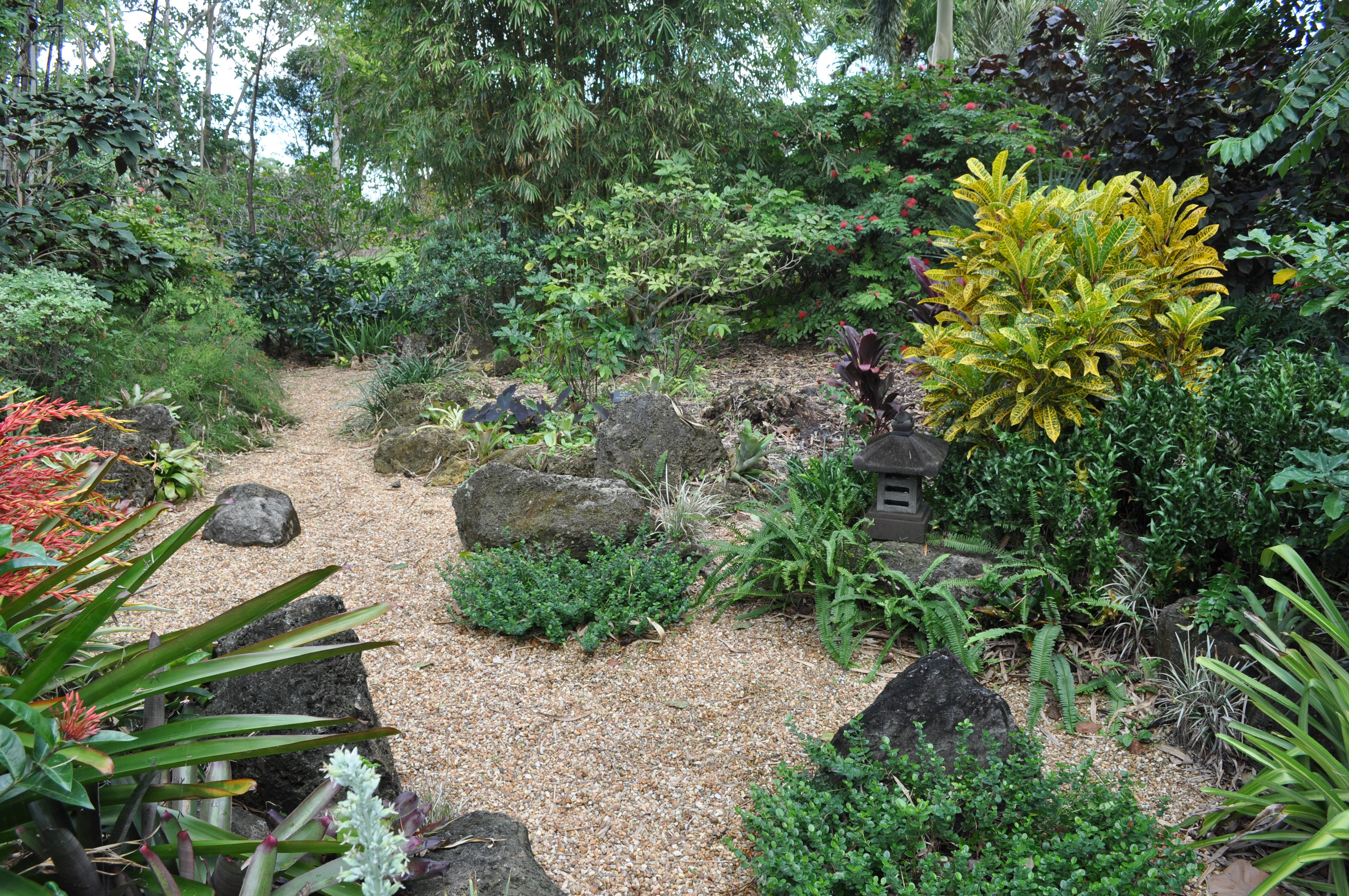
Dry stream bed (bioswale)

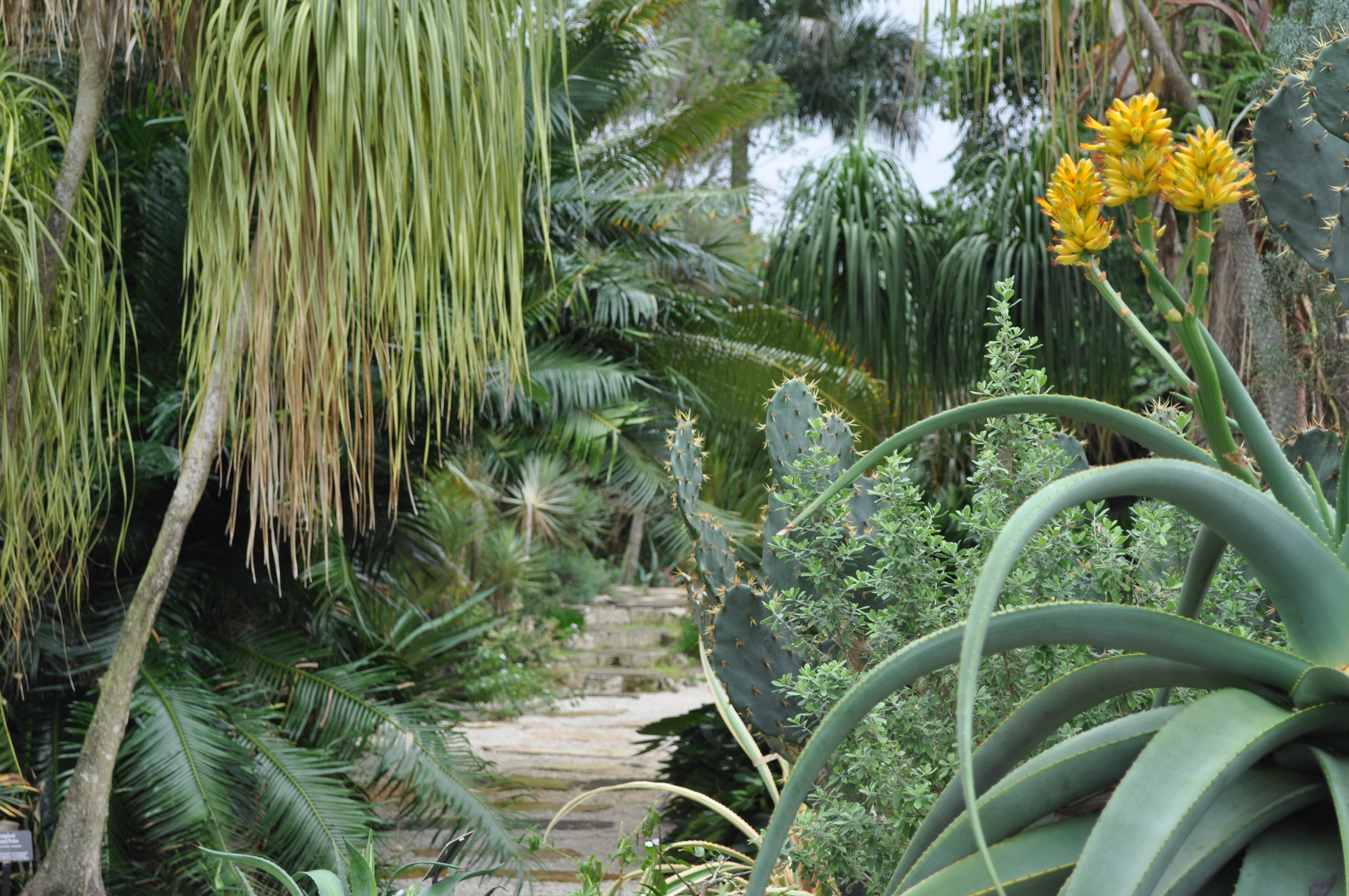
Garden of Extremes

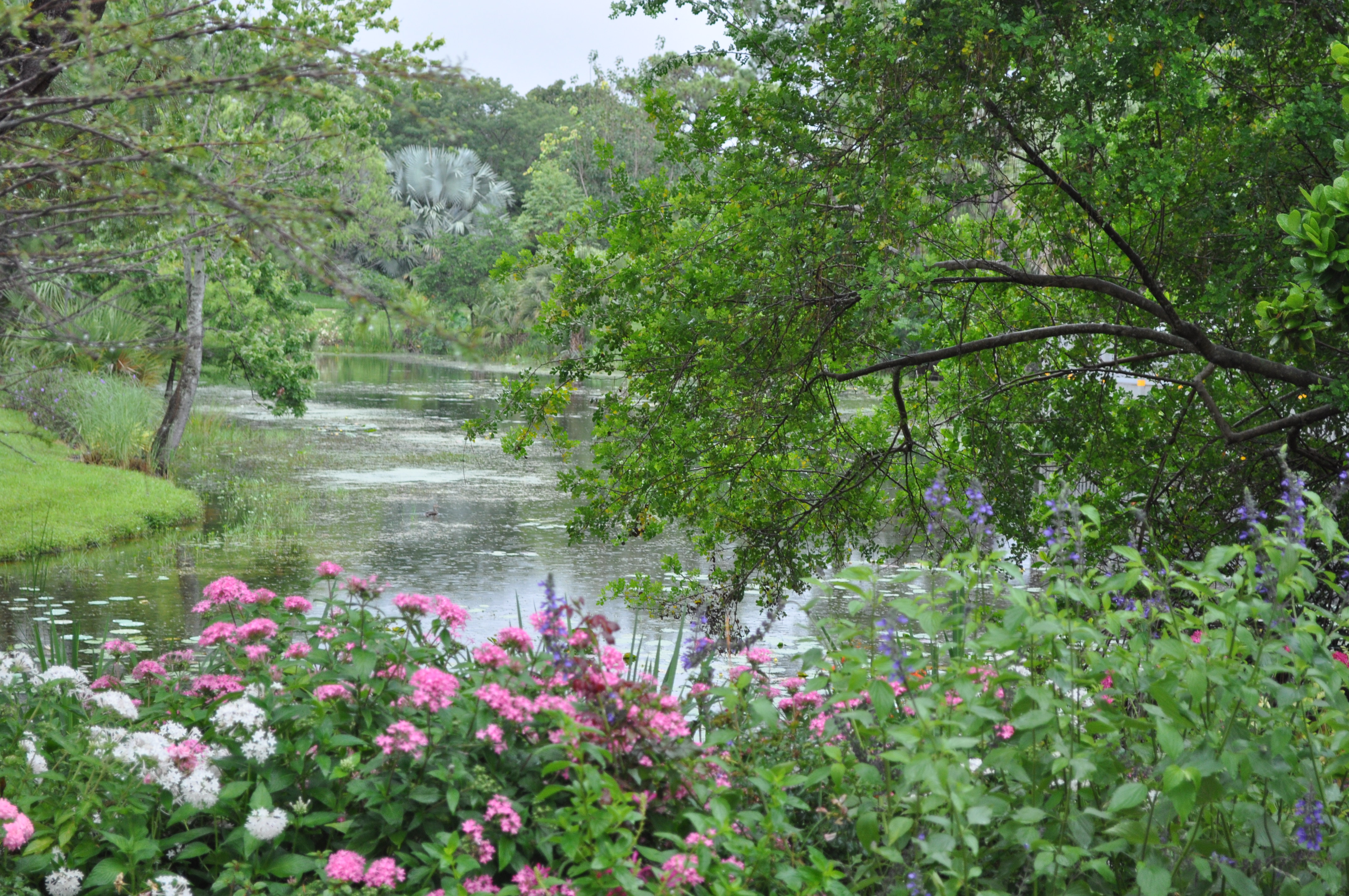
Tropical Cottage Garden

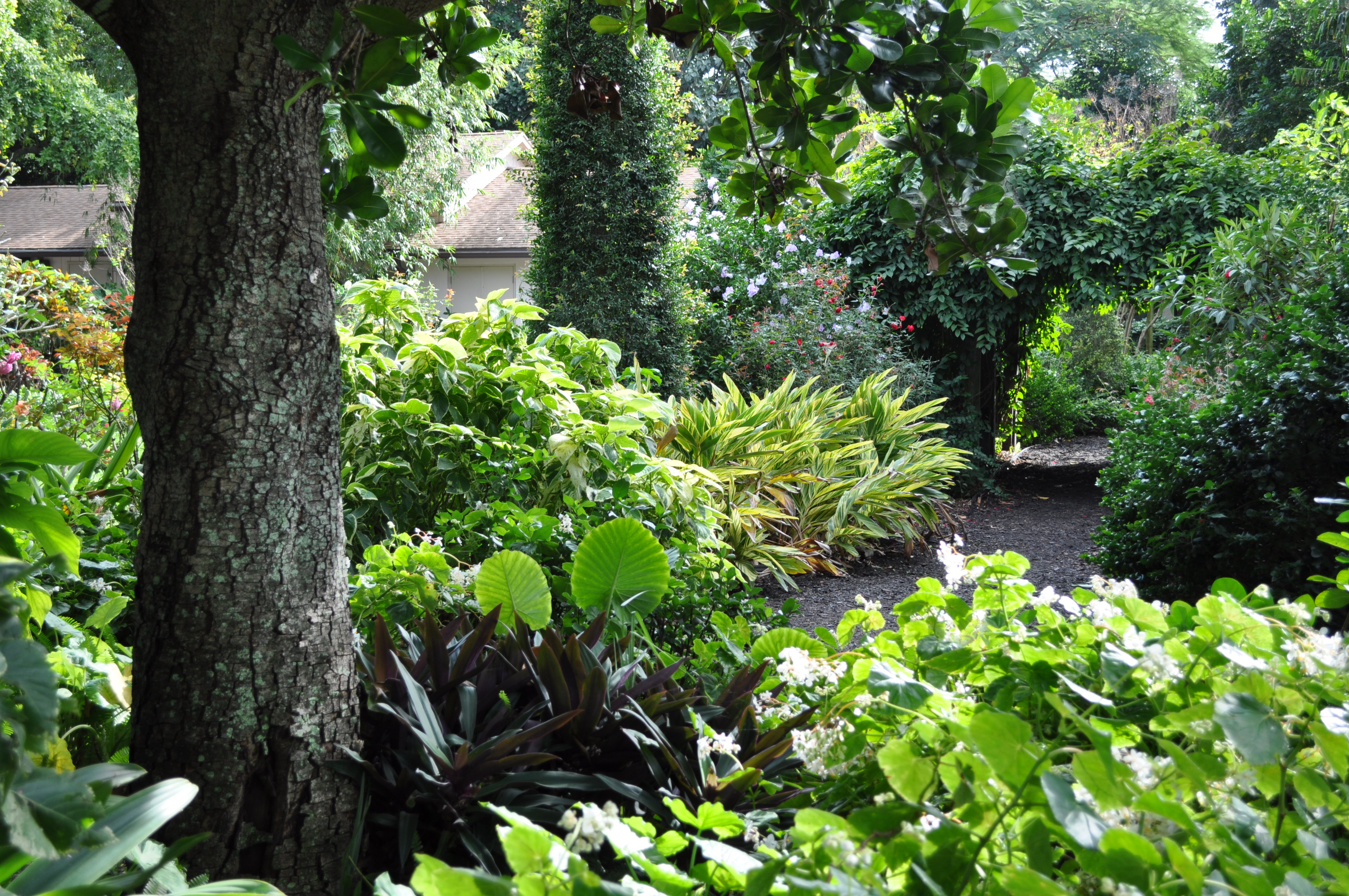
Rose and Fragrance Garden

== See also ==
- List of botanical gardens in Florida
