= Boyd Hill Nature Preserve =

Coordinates: 27.733°N 82.658°W

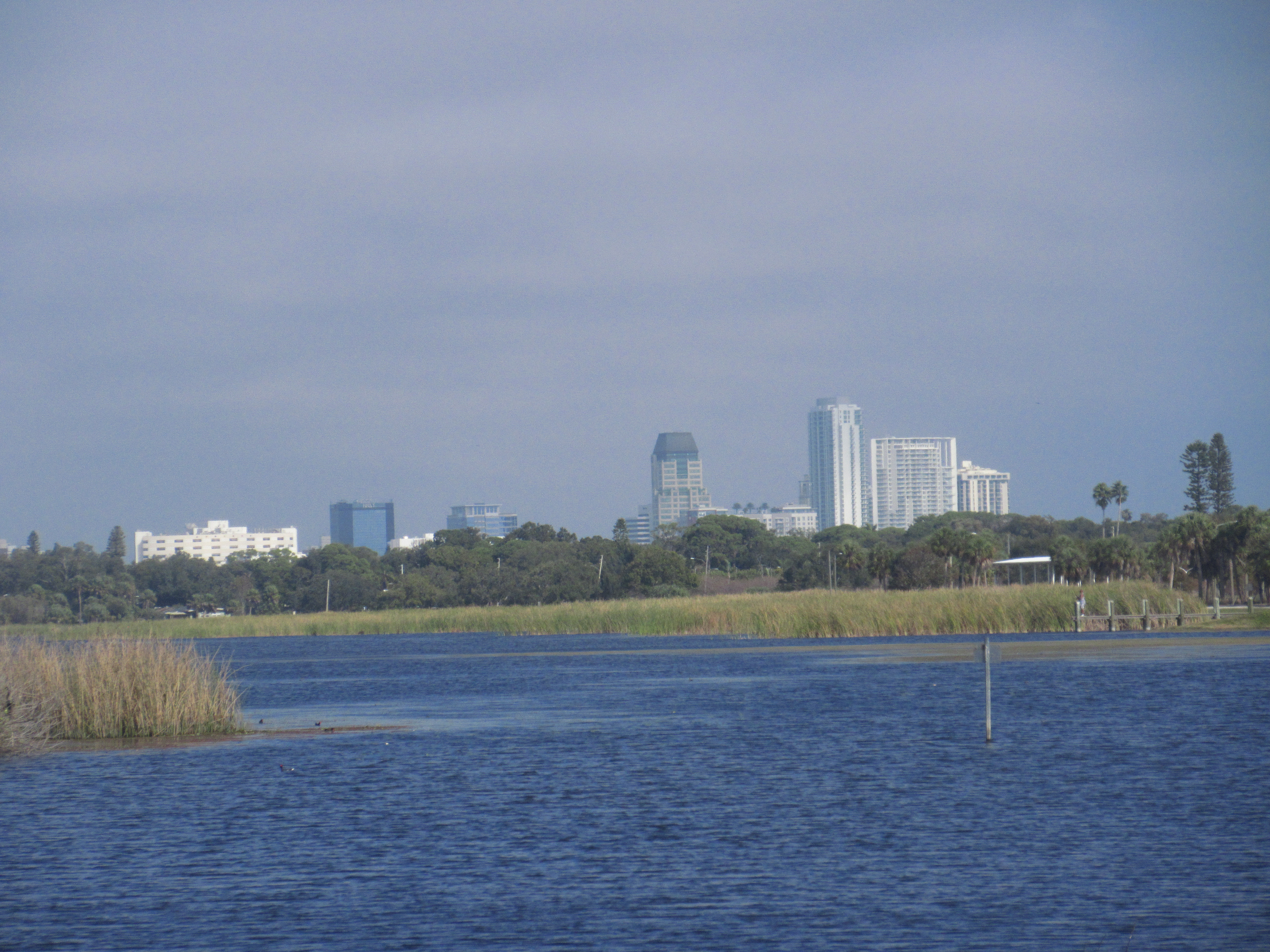
View of downtown St. Petersburg from boardwalk over protected wetlands

Boyd Hill Nature Preserve is a 245-acre (99 ha) protected area in Pinellas County, Florida. It is located on the shores of Lake Maggiore in south St. Petersburg and is operated by the city's Parks and Recreation department.

The preserve contains over 3 mi (4.8 km) of trails through a variety of natural communities. These include lakes, freshwater marshes, and swamps as well as pine flatwoods, scrub, and hardwood hammocks. Common wetland plants include red maple, giant leather fern, lizard's tail, willow, and bald cypress. Upland areas include saw palmetto, live oak, cabbage palm, bracken, goldenrod, and three types of pine:sand, longleaf, and slash. Migratory birds and other wildlife rely on Lake Maggiore as a food source.

Facilities include a playground and picnic areas. The preserve is also used for school field trips and hosts environmental education programs. It is located at 1101 Country Club Way South.

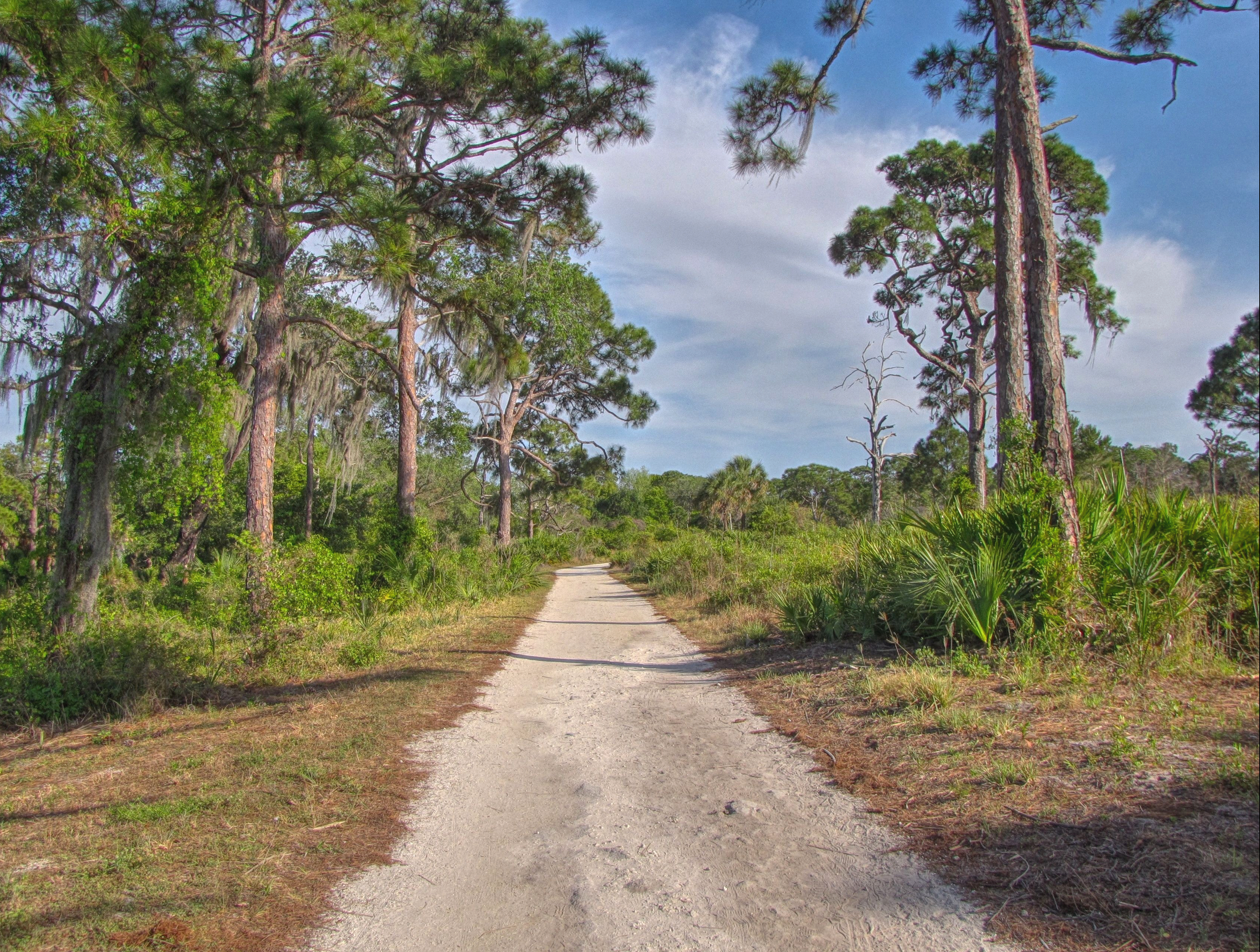
Trail through the preserve

A longtime resident of St. Petersburg, the late Paul Eppling used recycled metal and scrap metal to make sculptures. Boyd Hill Nature Preserve has seven of his sculptures: Narcissus from Greek mythology in the parking lot, a similar figure in a tree behind the environmental center, a glass-top table inside the environmental center, two large armadillos near Wax Myrtle Pond, a heron near Lake Maggiore Island, and another bird in front of Boyd Hill's aviary, where injured raptors are cared for.
