= Unbelievable Acres Botanic Gardens =

Botanical garden in West Palm Beach, Florida, United States

Coordinates: 26.684266°N 80.142772°W

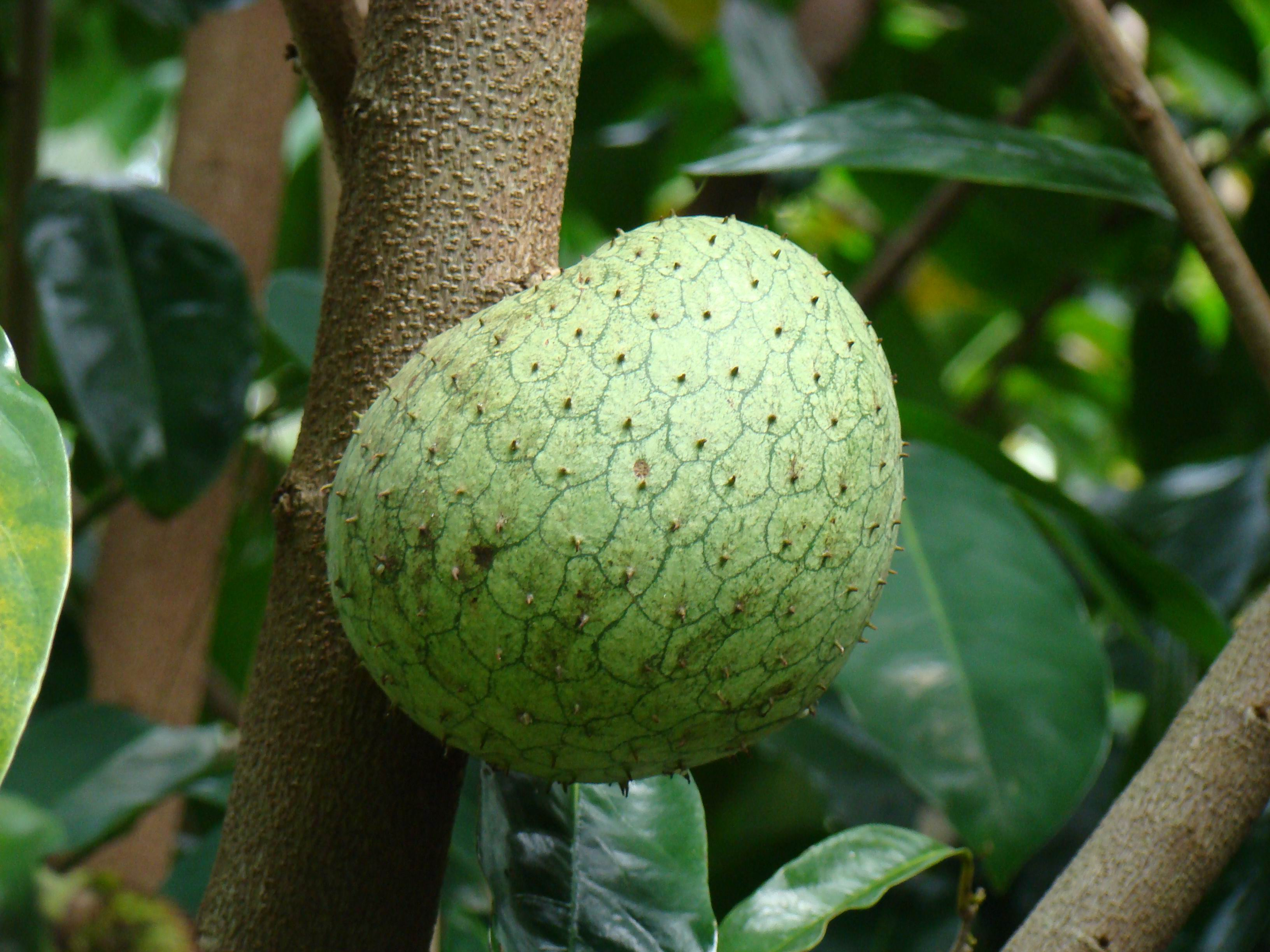
- Interactive map of Unbelievable Acres Botanic Gardens
- Website: www.unbelievableacresbotanicgardens.org

Unbelievable Acres Botanic Gardens (1 ha / 2.5 acres) is a private man-made, nonprofit botanical garden located at 470 63rd Trail North, West Palm Beach, Florida, United States.

The Tropical Rainforest garden was established in 1970 by Gene Joyner, who has developed and maintained it since. It is now one of Florida's largest private collections of tropical fruit trees, with a 30-metre-high (100 ft) tree canopy.

The garden contains some 2500 varieties of plants, including more than 160 varieties of fruit trees, with 40 types of citrus, and 35 types of banana and plantain trees. It also includes orchids, bromeliads, palms, and ferns, as well as less well-known plants such as jaboticaba, black sapote, jackfruit, and carambola trees.

== See also ==
- List of botanical gardens in the United States
