= Port St. Lucie Botanical Gardens =

Botanical garden in Port St. Lucie, Florida, U.S.

Coordinates: 27.27006°N 80.31846°W

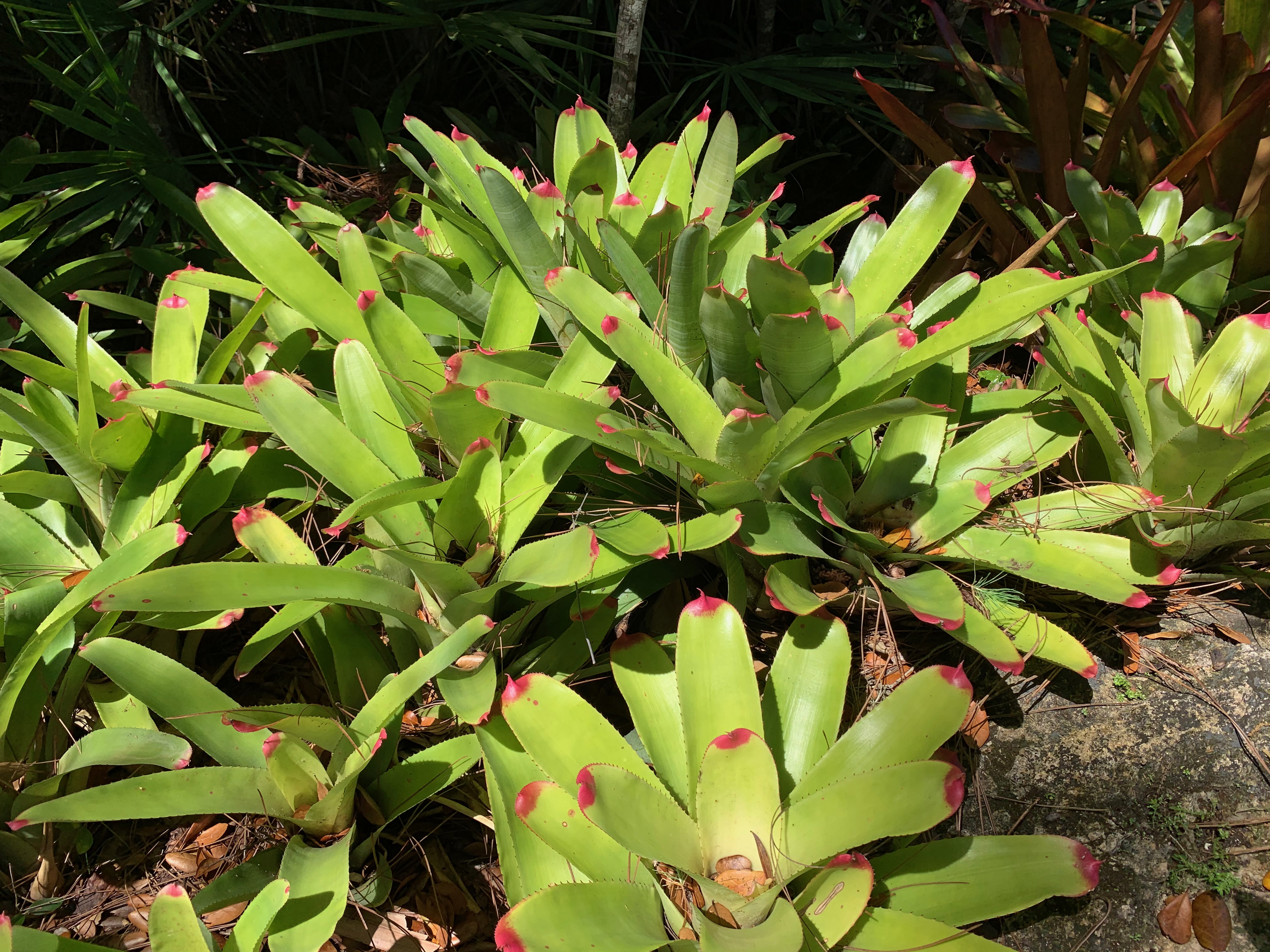
- Neoregelia cruenta at the gardens.
- Interactive map of Port St. Lucie Botanical Gardens
- Location: Port St. Lucie, Florida, United States
- Website: www.pslbg.org

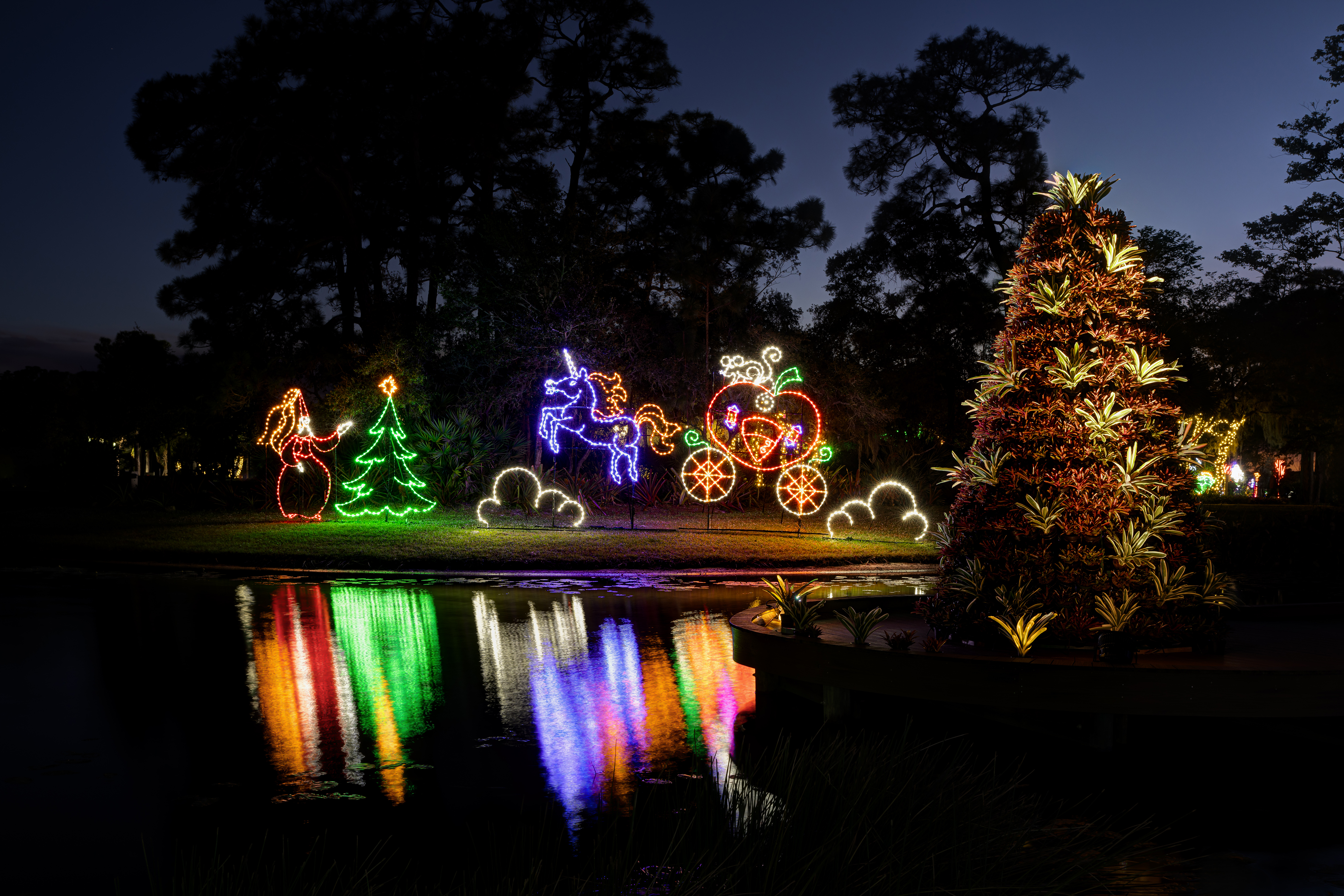
Christmas lights at Port St. Lucie Botanical Gardens

The Port St. Lucie Botanical Gardens is a 21-acre subtropical botanical garden located at 2410 SE Westmoreland Blvd, Port St. Lucie, Florida, United States.

The garden opened in March 2010 and is operated by The Friends of the Port St. Lucie Botanical Gardens, a non-profit, 501 (C)3 educational foundation. The construction of the garden began on March 4, 2009 and the grand opening was on March 6, 2010.

The setting includes a bamboo garden, bonsai garden, bromeliad island, butterfly garden, faery garden, cactus & succulents island, hibiscus garden, native plants, orchid room, palm walk, rose garden, serenity garden, and tropical fruit garden. It also includes a two-acre lake, 4100-sq.ft. Pavilion, amphitheater, which serves as a popular wedding venue. The garden also had a center for selling saplings.

The garden offers free annual illuminated light display during the holidays.

== See also ==
- List of botanical gardens in the United States
