= Palma Sola Botanical Park =

Botanical garden in Florida

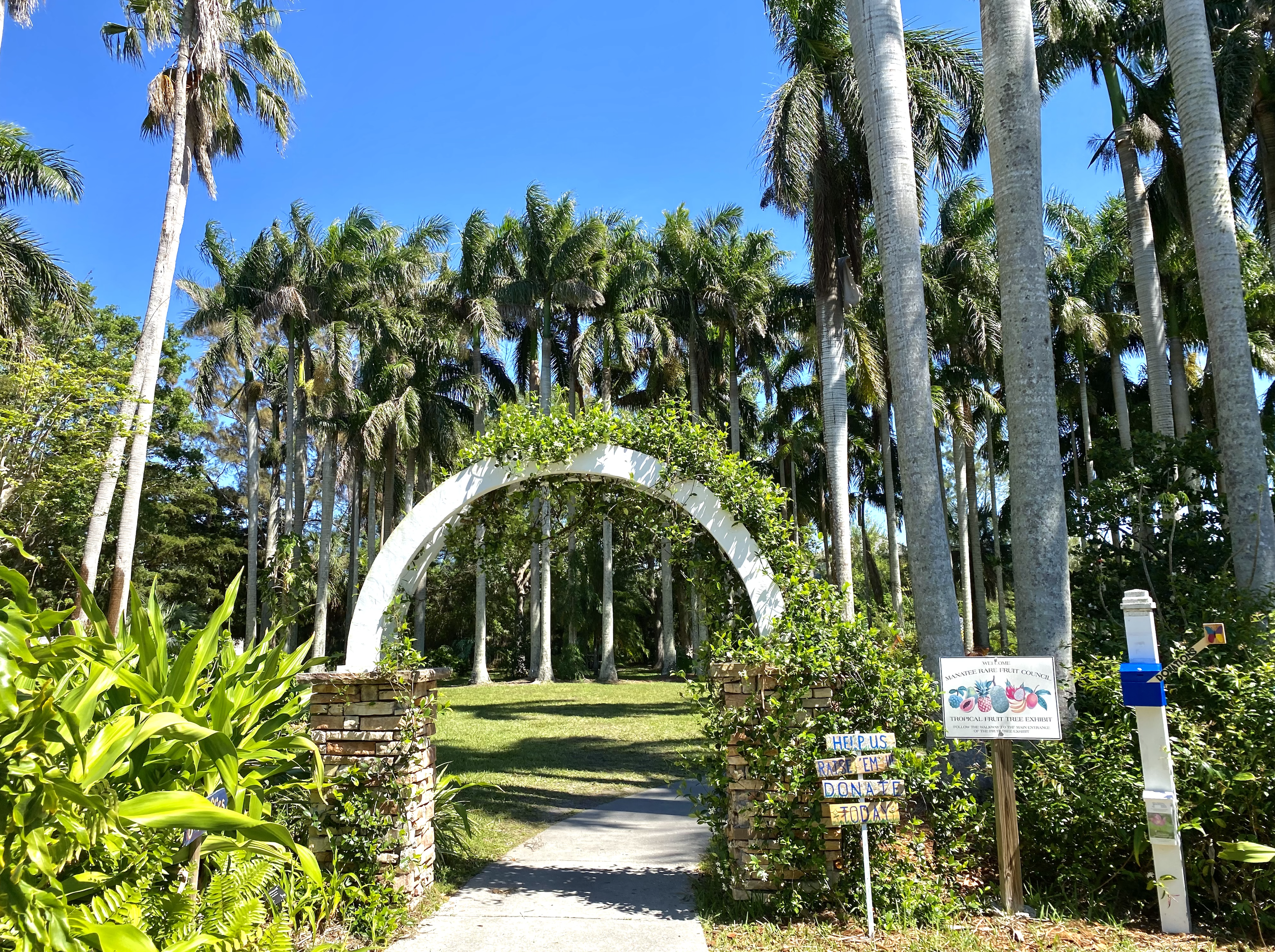
- Entrance
- Interactive map of Palma Sola Botanical Park
- Type: Botanical garden
- Location: Palma Sola, Florida
- Coordinates: 27.5135°N 82.6600°W
- Area: 10 acres (4.0 ha)
- Website: palmasolabp.org

Palma Sola Botanical Park is a botanical garden located at 9800 17th Avenue N.W. Bradenton, Florida, United States. The park showcases collections of rare palms, fruits, and flowering trees, as well as three lakes, a butterfly garden, gazebo, and pavilion. It is open daily without charge.

== Overview ==
The park began in 1990 when a group organized to save the Manatee County palm nursery by turning it into a botanical garden. In 1993 a non-profit foundation was formed, which in 1996 agreed with Manatee County Government to establish the Palma Sola Botanical Park. Today's park is a joint venture between the Manatee County parks department and the nonprofit Palma Sola Botanical Park Foundation.

== Gallery ==
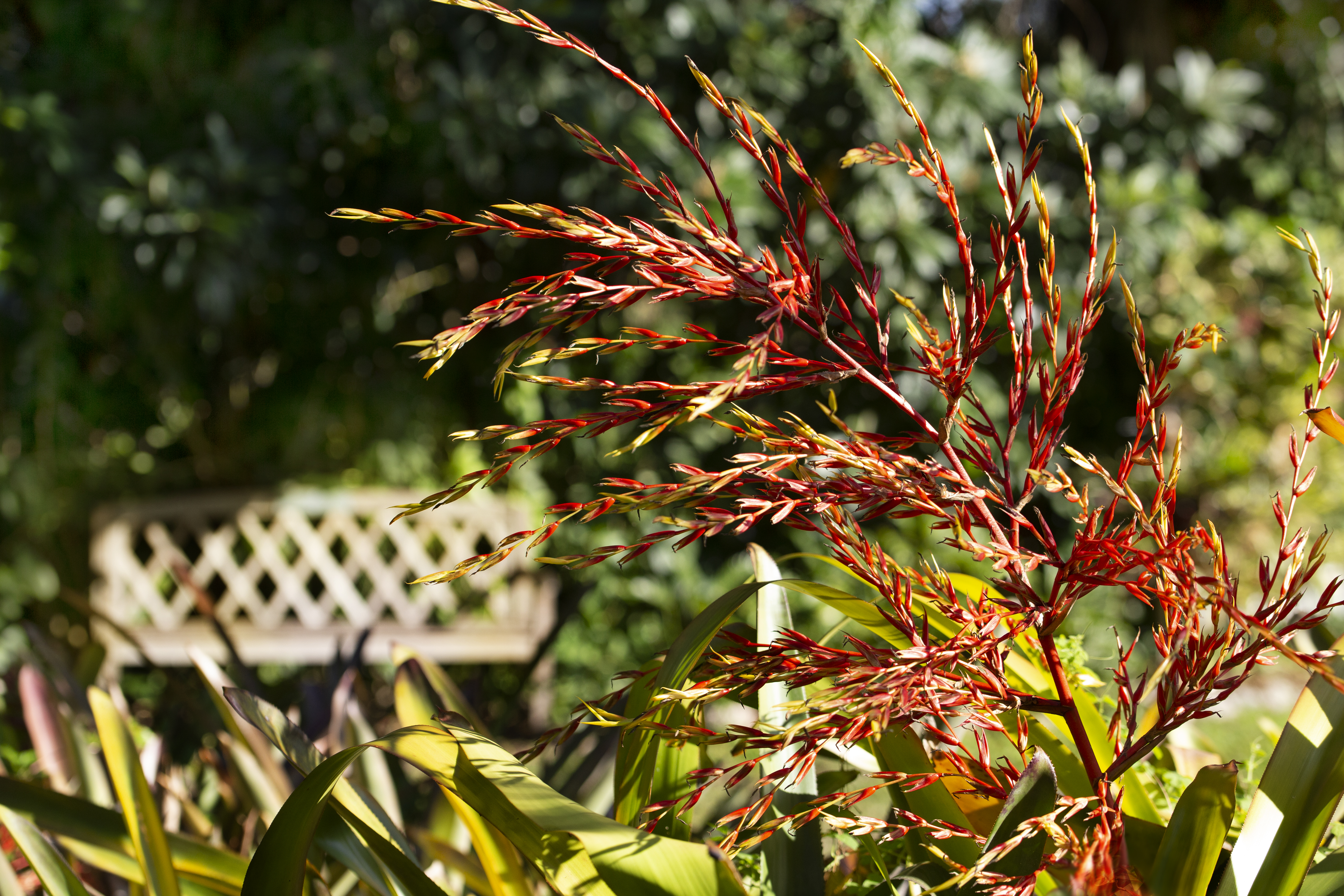

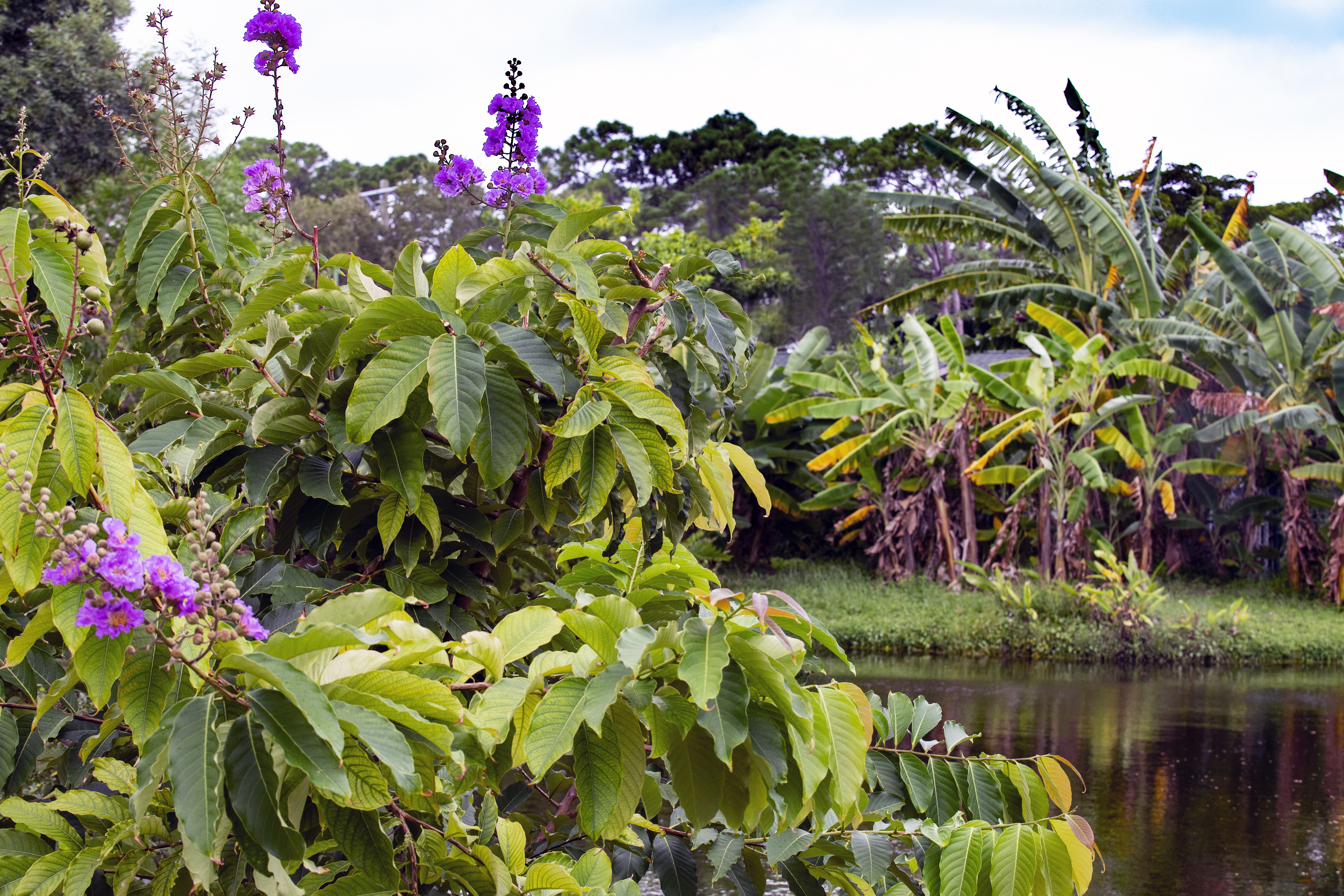

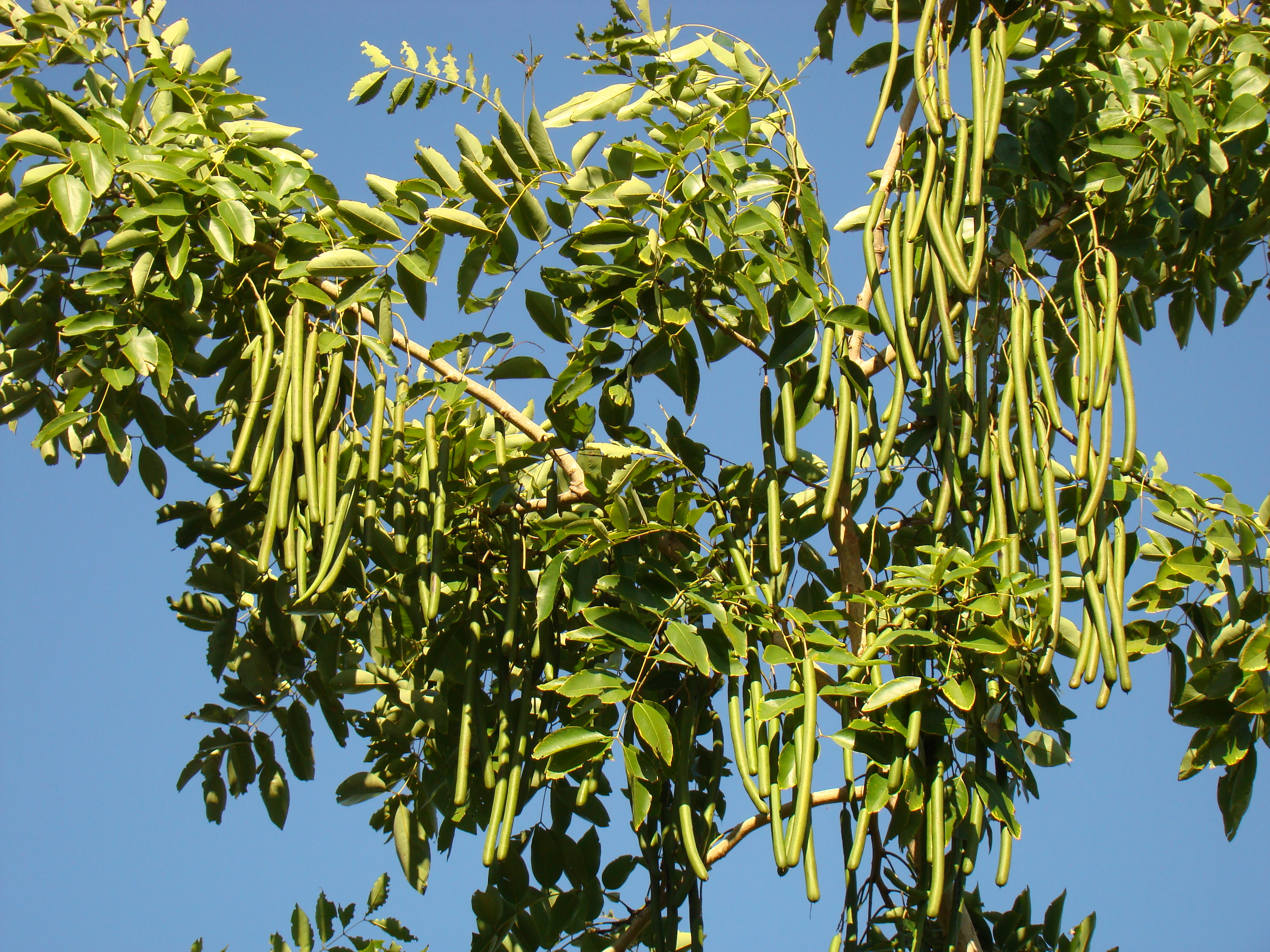

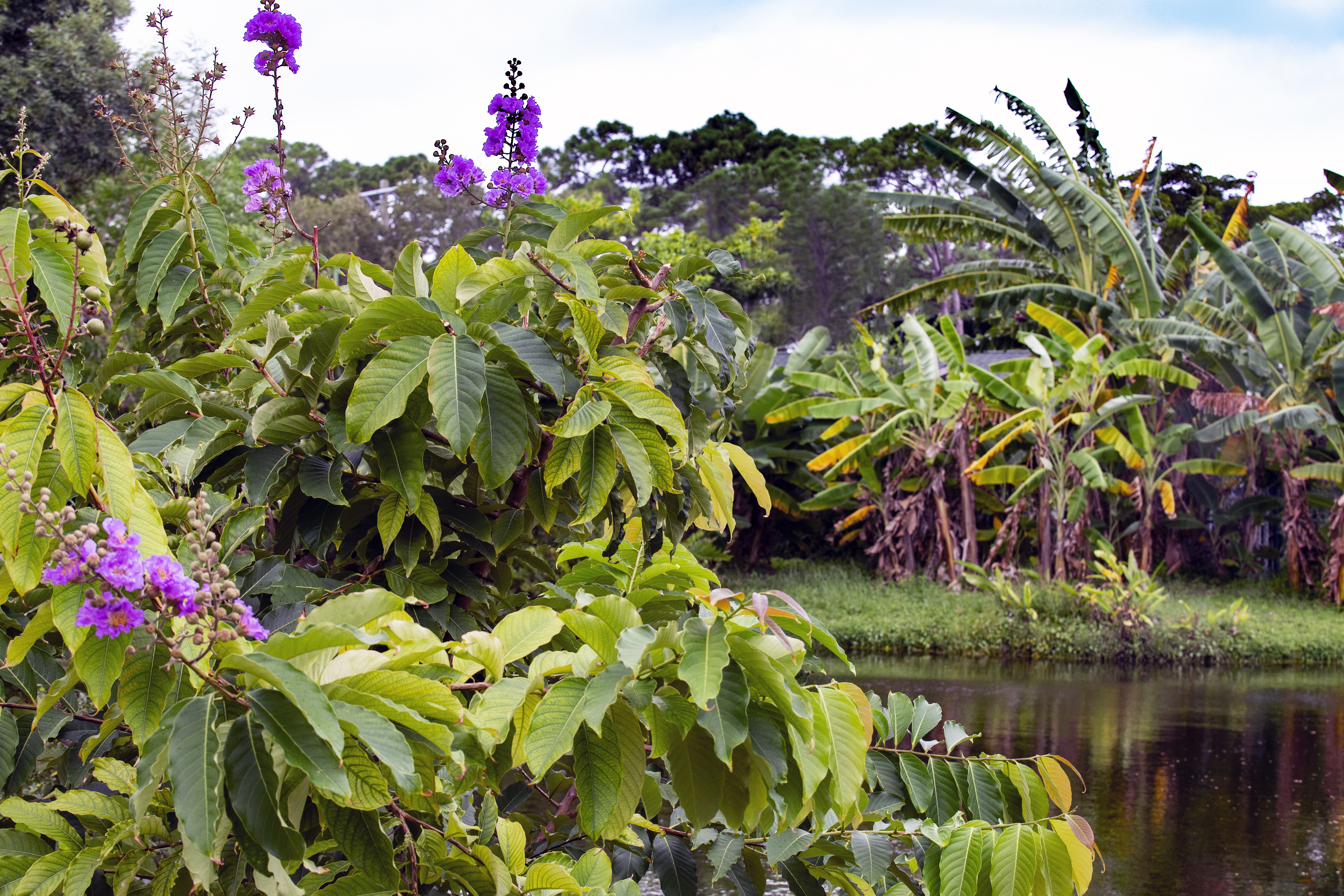

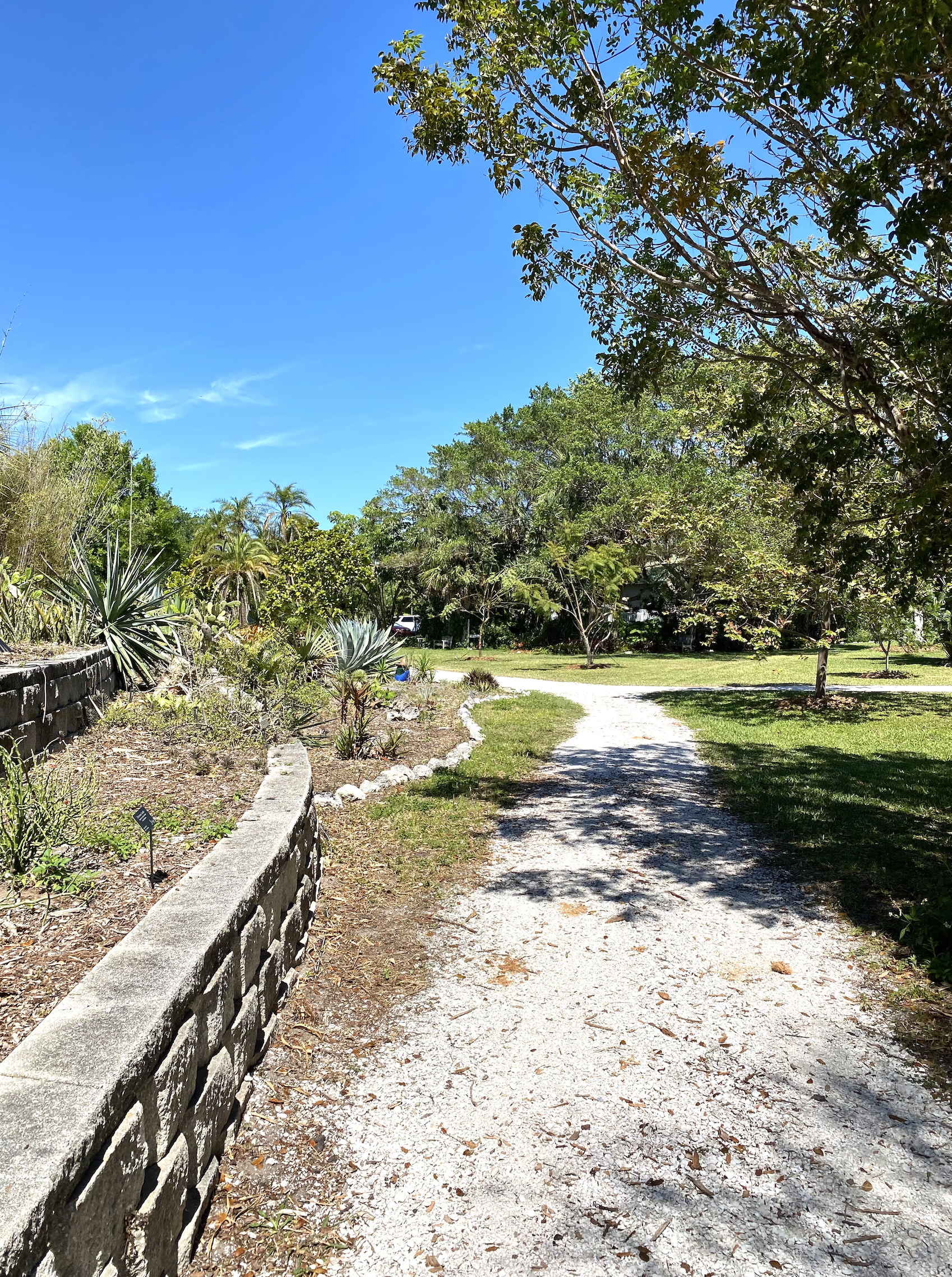

== See also ==
- Palma Sola, Florida
- List of botanical gardens in the United States
