= University of South Florida Botanical Gardens =

Botanical garden located on the campus of the University of South Florida

Coordinates: 28°03′16″N 82°24′47″W

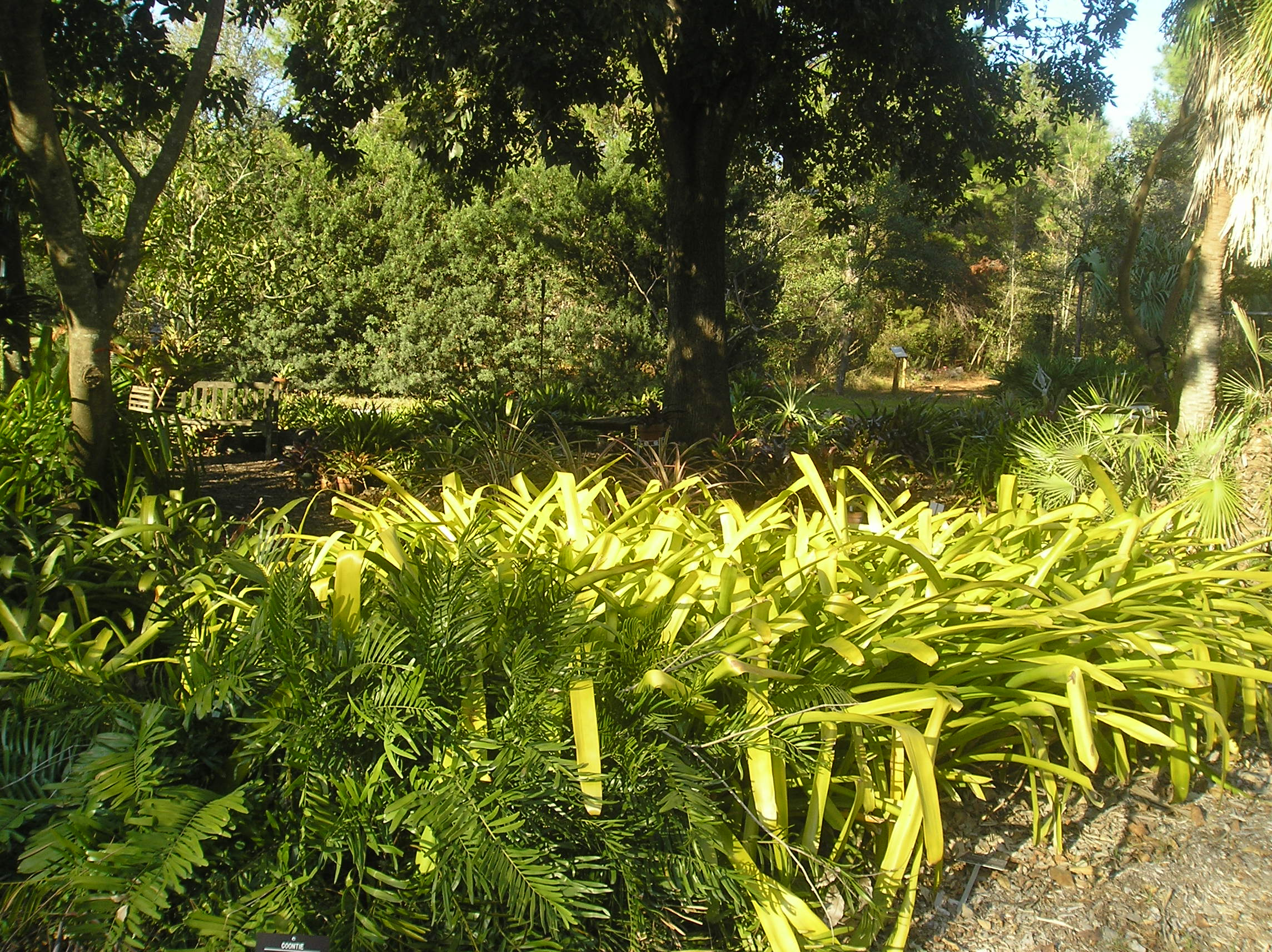
- A section of the garden.
- Interactive map of University of South Florida Botanical Gardens
- Website: Official website

The University of South Florida Botanical Gardens 15 acres (6.1 hectares) are located on the campus of the University of South Florida in Tampa, Florida, United States, and consist of 7 acres (2.8 hectares) of developed gardens plus 6 to 9 acres (2.4 to 3.6 hectares) of natural greenbelt. It is a member of the American Public Gardens Association, American Horticulture Society Reciprocal Admissions Program, Greater Temple Terrace Chamber of Commerce, and Visit Florida and receives about 35,000 visitors annually. The gardens are open to the public during weekday business hours, and on shorter weekend hours. Admission is $5 for adults.

== History ==
The botanical gardens were established in 1969 for use by the Biology Department in the USF College of Arts and Sciences. In the early 1970s many of today's temperate, subtropical, and tropical trees and shrubs were planted. During the late 1970s and 1980s, the palm garden, the wetland forest, and sand scrub beds were planted. New structures and demonstration gardens were built in the 1990s. Today, it is part of the Department of Geography, Environment and Planning in the College of Arts and Sciences at USF.

== Collection ==
The gardens contain over 3,000 taxa of plants including: fruit trees, bonsai trees, grasses, begonias, orchids, bromeliads, palms, aroids, bamboo, gingers, carnivorous plants, cycads, cactus and succulent plants, an herb and scent garden, wetland forest, temperate forest, subtropical shade garden, and Florida upland scrub and sandhill habitats. The gardens also has a medicinal herb garden, which is used by the USF College of Pharmacy for research purposes. While not part of the collection, native wildlife, including butterflies and over 60 species of birds, can frequently be found in the garden.

== Festivals and Events ==
The USF Botanical Gardens hosts events such as flower and garden festivals, where visitors have the opportunity to learn about and purchase plants from vendors. The gardens also host workshops such as beekeeping workshops, where the public can learn about a specific skill. The USF Botanical Gardens have also hosted yoga classes and is a popular wedding venue.

== Gallery ==
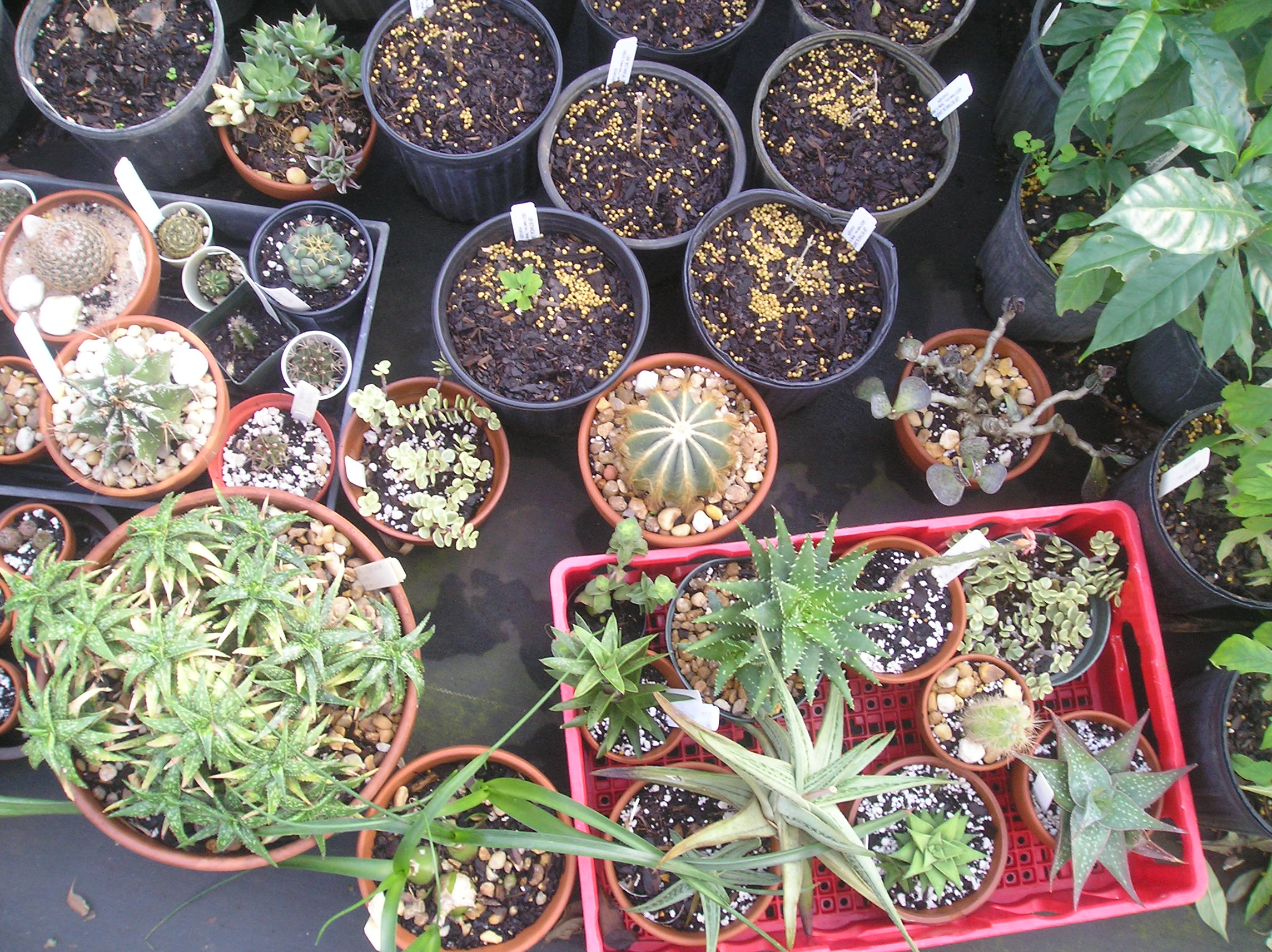

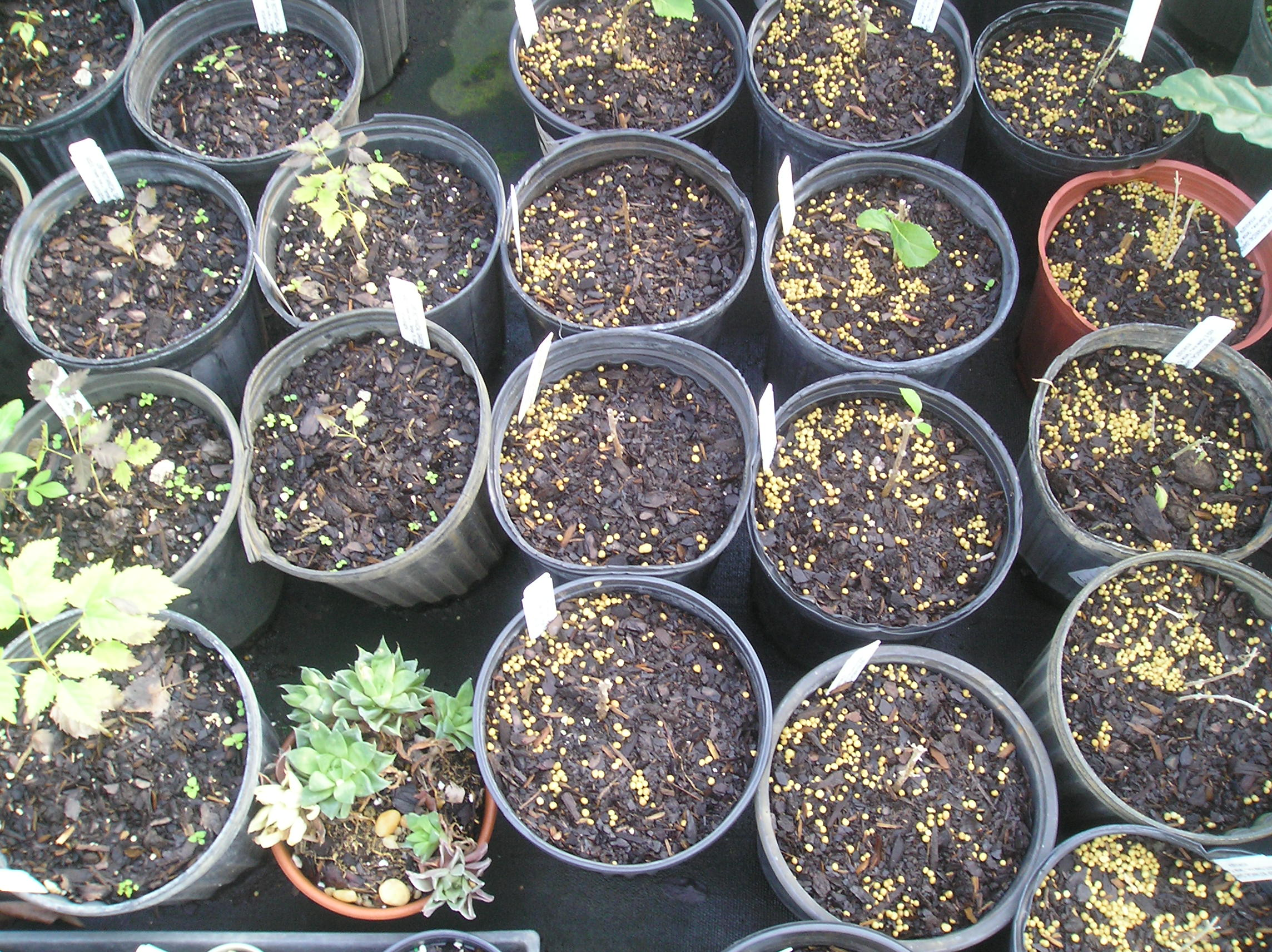

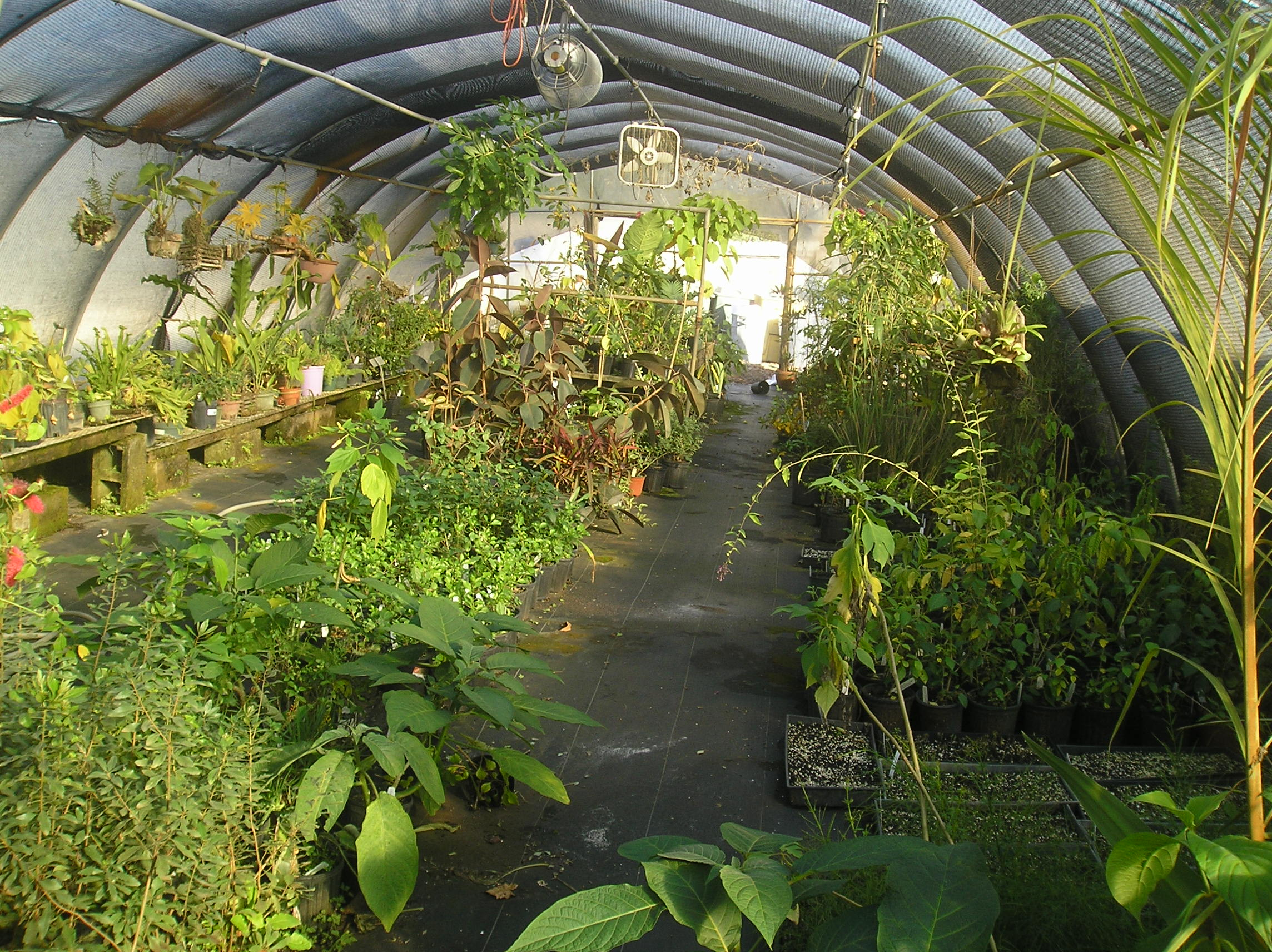

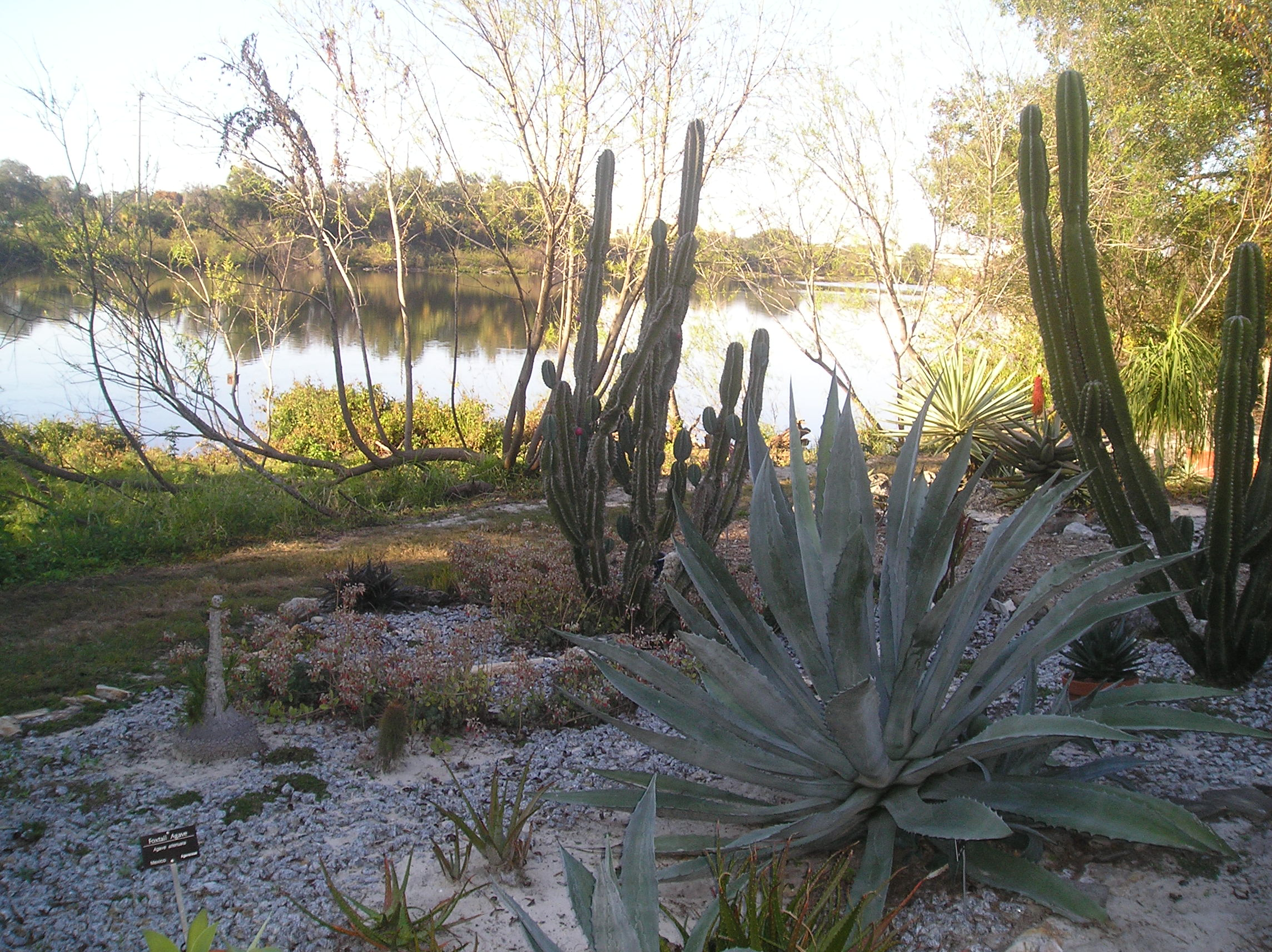

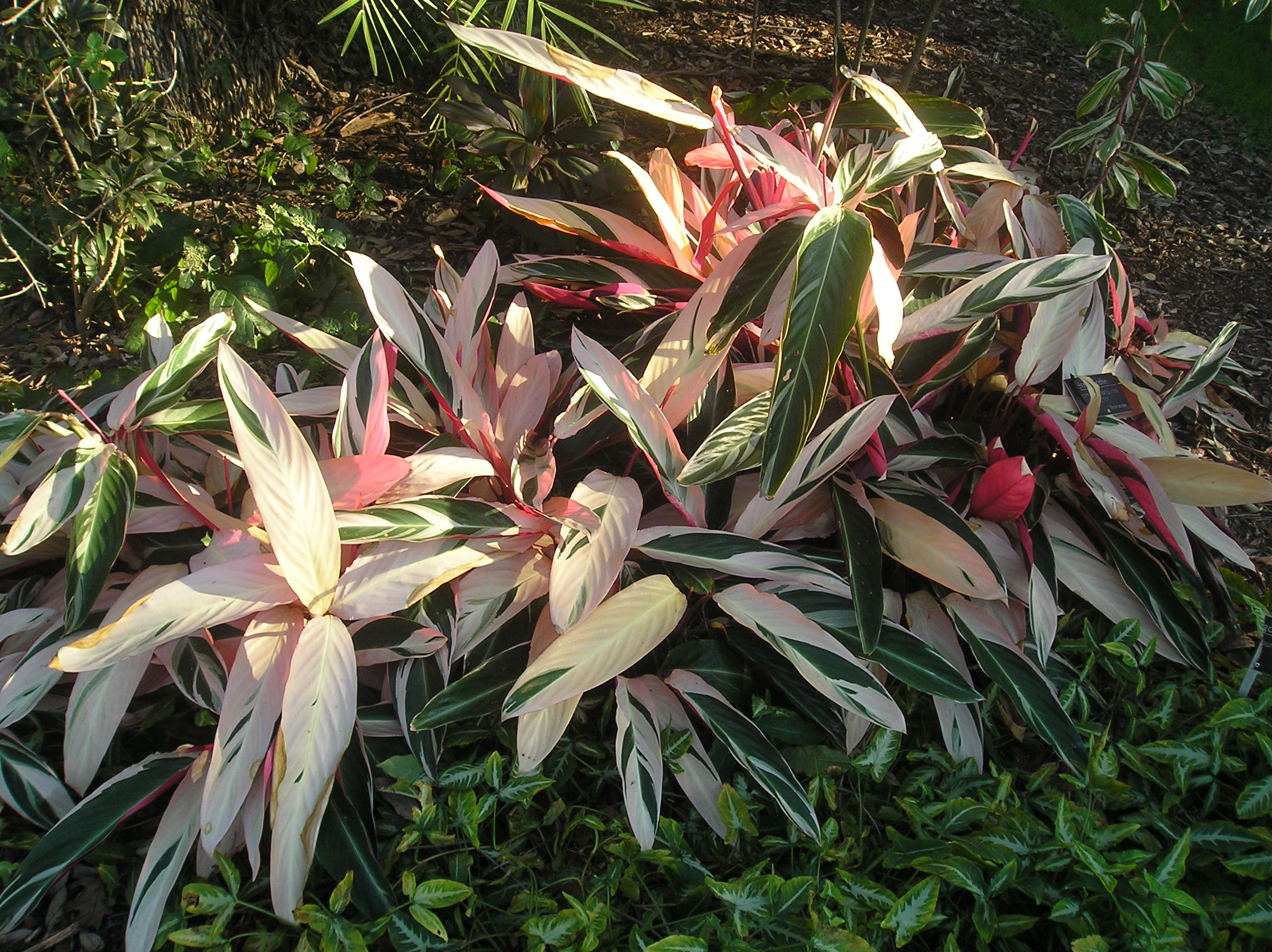

== See also ==
- List of botanical gardens in the United States
