= List of ghost towns in Florida =

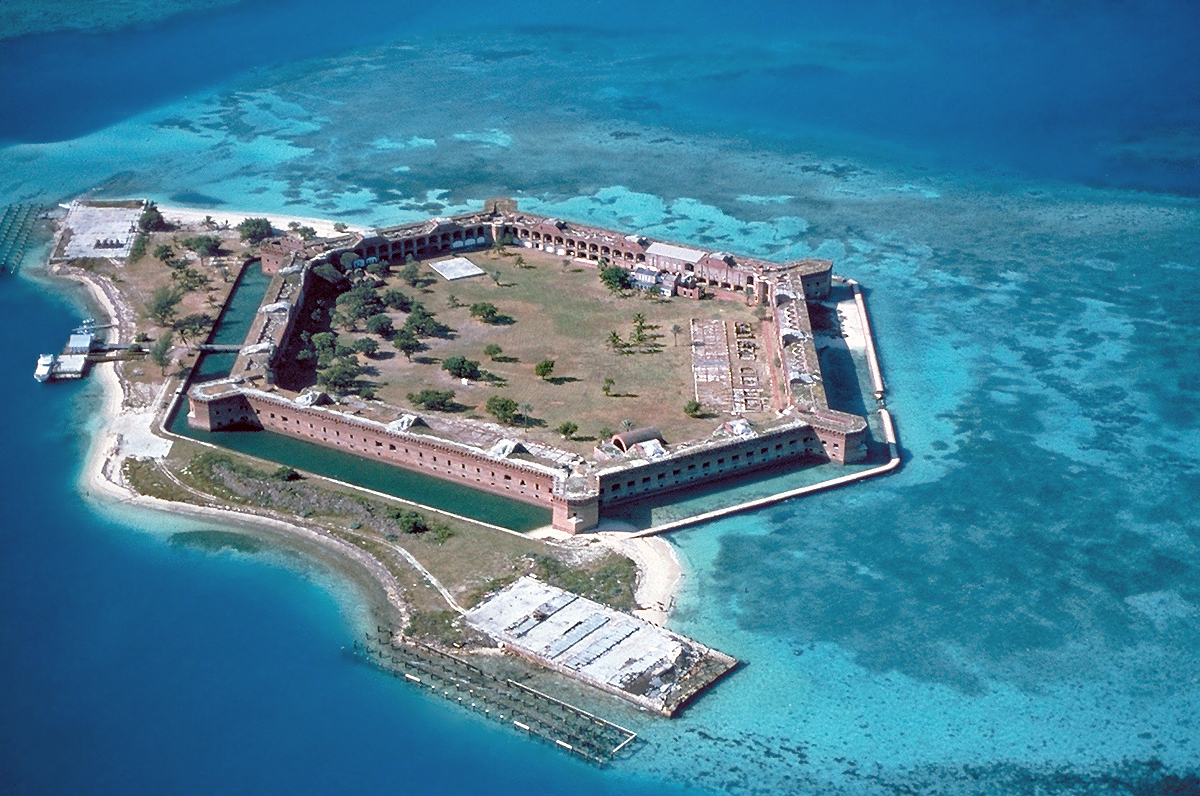
Fort Jefferson, Florida is a massive but unfinished coastal fortress. It is the largest masonry structure in the Americas, and is composed of over 16 million bricks. The fort is located on Garden Key in the lower Florida Keys within the Dry Tortugas National Park, about 70 miles (110 km) west of the island of Key West.

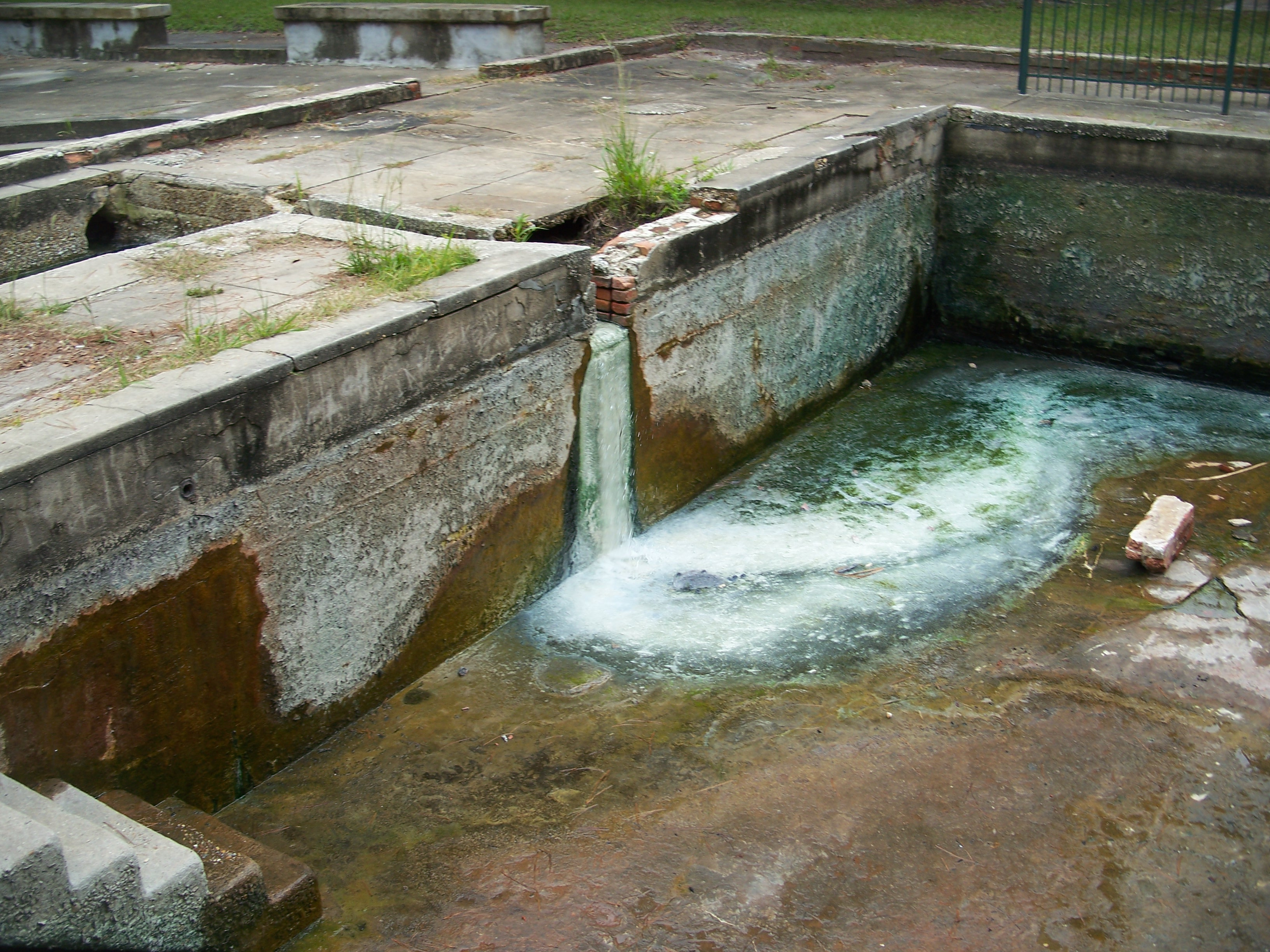
Site of the old Hampton Springs Hotel at Hampton Springs, Florida

This is an incomplete list of ghost towns in Florida sortable by name, county, or coordinates. The county names are modern (as of 2018); in several cases, the ghost town, when inhabited, was in a different county than the modern one.

Town	Other names	County	Latitude/longitude	Established	Abandoned	Status	Remarks
Acron		Lake	29°0.1'N 81°31.2'W				
Acton		Polk	28°3.2'N 81°56.0'W				
Agricola		Polk	27°47.3'N 81°53.3'W				
Aladdin City		Miami-Dade	25°34.6'N 80°27.2'W				
Allenhurst		Brevard	28°44.1'N 80°45.4'W				
Andytown		Broward	26°8.7'N 80°26.6'W				
Angola		ManateeSarasota	27°29'N 82°35'W				exact location is undetermined
Anona		Pinellas	27°53.6'N 82°49.9'W				Inhabited
Apix		Palm Beach	26°56.6'N 80°20.6'W				
Apoxsee		Osceola	27°48.0'N 80°56.4'W				
Arlington		Citrus	28°52.2' 82°21.7'W				
Atsena Otie Key		Levy	29°7.3'N 83°1.6'W				
Aurytown		Glades	26°50.0'N 81°17.8'W				
Aurytown		Pinellas	28°4.8'N 82°49.9'W				
Balm		Hillsborough	27°44.5'N 82°12.2'W				Inhabited
Bareah		Polk	27°39.6'N 81°37.5'W				
Barrsville		Columbia	30°0'N 82°35'W				
Basinger		Okeechobee	27°23.3'N 81°2.0'W				
Bay Harbor		Bay	30°8.7'N 85°37.3'W				Industrial
Bayview		Lake	28°32.7'N 82°38.6'W				
Bayview		Pinellas	27°27.5'N 82°42.5'W				Inhabited
Bean City		Palm Beach	26°40.9'N 80°45.7'W				
Bermont		Charlotte	26°56.8'N 81°45.7'W				
Bethany		Manatee	27°28.4'N 82°16.2'W				Inhabited
Birdon		Collier	25°54±'N 81°18.6'W				
Boyette		Hillsborough	27°49.1'N 82°13.4'W				
Brewster		Polk	27°45.1'N 81°58.4'W				
Bryant		Palm Beach	26°50.9'N 80°36.8'W				
Buchanan		Hardee	27°24.7'N 81°47.7'W				
Bullowville		Flagler	21°25'N 81°09'N				
Bunce Village		Pinellas	27°38.7'N 82°44.3'W				
Bunkerhill		Manatee	27°35.7'N 82°12.4'W				Inhabited
Campville		Alachua	29°39.9'N 82°7.1'W				
Castor Town		Hillsborough	27°35±'N 82°45.7'W				
Centralia		Hernando	28°36.9'N 82°32.7'W				
Chetwynd		Lake	28°52.6'N 81°55.0'W				
Chevelier		Monroe	25°43'13.4"N 81°12'59.3"W				
Chicora		Polk	27°43.8'N 81°59'W				
Chokoloskee		Collier	25°48.8'N 81°21.6'W				Inhabited
Chosen		Palm Beach	26°42'N 80°46.8'W				
Citrus Center		Glades	26°48.8'N 81°14.9'W				
Clifton		Brevard	28°45.0'N 80°46.2'W				
College Hill		Hardee	27°37.7'N 81°52.3'W				
Columbus		Suwannee	30°23.1'N 83°10.4'W				
Conant		Lake	28°56.3'N 81°55.7'W				
Cornwell		Highlands	27°23.7'N 81°9.4'W				
Cosme		Hillsborough	28°06.5'N 82°34.4'W				Inhabited
Craig		Monroe	24.8379°N 80.7595°W				
Crewsville		Hardee	27°25.3'N 81°35.0'W				
Cromanton (Tyndall Air Force Base)		Bay	30°7.0'N 85°37.6'W				
Croom		Hernando	28°35.4'N 82°13.7'W				Inhabited
Cutler		Miami-Dade	25°36.9'N 80°18.6'W				
Deep Lake		Collier	26°02.5'N 81°20.6'W				
Deer Park		Osceola	28°5.5'N 80°53.9'W				Inhabited
East Goose Creek		Wakulla	30°6.3'N 84°15.7'W				
Earleton	Rosetta	Alachua	29° 44′ 38″ N 82° 6′ 12″ W				
Eden		Saint Lucie	27°16.5'N 80°14.6'W				Inhabited
Edgeville		Manatee	27°18.9'N 82°6.5'W				Intersection of Sugar Bowl Rd and SR 70.
Eldora		Volusia	28°54.6'N 80°49.2'W				
Electra		Marion	29°7.7'N 81°53.3'W				
Ellaville		Madison	30°23.2'N 83°10.4'W				
Emmaton		Polk	28.186847,-81.590347				
Englewood		Orange	28°23.7'N 81°30.2'W				
Espanola		Flagler	29°30.4 81°18.5'W				Inhabited
Ethel		Lake	28°50.1'N 81°26.6'W				
Fairmount		Citrus	28°52'47.4"N 82°32'05.2"W				
Fivay		Pasco	28°19.9'N 82°38.4±'W				
Flamingo		Monroe	25°8.5'N 81°0'W				
Fontaine		Brevard	28°45.4'N 80°54.4'W				
Fort Basinger		Highlands	27°21.7'N 81°3.2'W				
Fort Chokonikla		Hardee	27°37.2'N 81°48.5'W				
Fort Dade		Hillsborough	27°35.8'N 82°45.7'W				
Fort Dallas		Miami Dade	25°46.6'N 80°12.1'W				
Fort Denaud		Hendry	26°44.7'N 81°27.9'W				Inhabited
Fort DeSoto		Pinellas	27°38.2'N 82°44.2'W				
Fort Drum		Okeechobee	27°37.6'N 80°48.4'W				
Fort Jefferson		Monroe	24°37.7'N 82°52.4'W				
Fort King		Marion	29°11.2'N 82°5.0'W				
Fort Kissimmee		Polk/Highlands	27°35.5'N 81°9.4'W				
Fort Lonesome		Hillsborough	27°42.3'N 81°8.3'W				
Fort Mosé		St. Johns	29°55.8'N 81°19.3'W				
Fort Pickens		Escambia	30°19.5'N 87°16.8'W				
Freeman		Hernando	28°34'N 82°33'N				
Fruitcrest		Palm Beach	26°37.8'N 80°44.9'W				
Gaiter		Marion	29°0.5'N 82°20.6'W				
Gardena		Palm Beach	26°37.0'N 80°50.7'W				
Gardner		Hardee	27°21.1'N 81°48.1'W				
Garfield		Volusia	28°52.1'N 81°13.5'W				Now part of Deltona
Geerworth		Palm Beach	26°40.7'N 80°32.3'W				
Gillette		Manatee	27°36.1'N 82°31.7'W				
Gladecrest		Palm Beach	26°37.8'N 80°34.1'W				
Goodno		Glades	26°46.1'N 81°18.7'W				
Green Pond		Polk	28°18.6'N 81°53.9'W				
Greenbay		Polk	27°50.2'N 81°55.5'W				
Gulf City		Hillsborough	27°42.3'N 82°27.8'W				Inhabited
Hague		Alachua	29°46.2'N 82°25.3'W				Inhabited
Haile		Alachua	37°41.4'N 82°34.4'W				
Hall City		Glades	26°52.7'N 81°19.6'W				
Hampton Springs		Taylor	30°05.0'N 83°39.1'W				
Hardaway		Gadsden	30°37.9'N 84°44.2'W				
Harker		Collier	26°20.6′ N 81°20.6′W				
Hawkinsville		Lake	29°2.2'N 81°25.2'W				On the St. Johns River
Heidtville		Marion	29°3.6'N 82°20.6'W				
Helen		Leon	30°18.5'N 84°24.0'W				
Hicoria		Highlands	27°9.1'N 81°21.2'W				Inhabited
Hilolo		Okeechobee	27°26.9'N 80°46.3'W				
Holopaw		Osceola	28°8.2'N 81°4.6'W				Inhabited
Hopewell		Hillsborough	27°55.7'N 82°07.5'W				
Hopkins		Brevard	28°4.2'N 80°35.9'W				
Illahaw		Osceola	28°1.1'N 81°1.9'W				
Indian Key		Monroe	24°53'N 80°41'W				
Indiantown		Martin	27°1.8'N 80°29.0'				Inhabited
Island Grove		Alachua	29°27.2'N 82°6.4'W				Inhabited
Jane Jay		Polk	27°40.3'N 81°49.2'W				
Jerome		Collier	25°59.9'N 81°20.8'W				Inhabited
Jessamine		Pasco	28°24.8'N 82°16.2'W				
Juliette		Marion	29°6.2'N 82°26.4'W				
Juno		Palm Beach	26°50.6'N 80°3.6'W				Inhabited
Kenansville		Osceola	80°59.3'N 27°52.6'W				
Kerr City		Marion	29°22.5'N 81°46.9'W				
Kicco		Osceola					
Kismet		Lake	29°2.5'N 81°37.5'W				
Koreshan		Lee	26°26.0'N 81°49.0'W				Inhabited
Kreamer Island		Palm Beach	26°45.4'N 80°44.0'W				
Lake Fern		Hillsborough	28°8.9'N 82°34.8'W				Inhabited
Lake Jackson Mounds		Leon	30°30.0'N 84°18.5'W				
Lawtey		Bradford	30°2.6'N 82°4.3'W				Inhabited
Leno		Columbia	30°2.6'N 82°4.3'W				
Limona		Hillsborough	27°57.1'N 82°18.6'W				Inhabited
Linden		Sumter	28°33.7'N 82°2.0'W				
Liverpool		DeSoto	27°2.7'N 81°58.2'W				
Locosee		Osceola	27°45.3'N 80°54.7'W				
Lulu		Columbia	30°6.4'N 82°29.5'W				Inhabited
Mabel		Sumter	28°34.7'N 81°58.4'W				
Magnolia		Wakulla	30°13.2'N 84°10.5'W				
Manasota		Charlotte	27°0.8'N 82°24.2'W				
Manhattan		Manatee	27°23.1'N 82°19.2'W				
Mannfield		Citrus	28°47.0'N 82°26.6'W				
Markham		Seminole					
Midland		Polk	27°44.3'N 81°37.3'W				
Minton's Corner		Brevard	28°4.7'N 80°40.3'W				
Modello		Broward	26°3.0'N 80°8.8'W				Dania Beach
Moffit		Hardee	27°27.3'N 81°47.8'W				
Montague		Marion	29°9.0'N 82°4.4'W				
Montbrook		Levy	29°19.6'N 82°27.0'W				Inhabited
Muscogee		Escambia	30°36.4'N 87°24.8'W				
Naranja		Miami-Dade	25°31.0'N 80°25.3'W				Inhabited
Narcoossee		Osceola	28°17.9'N 81°14.3'W				Inhabited
Negro Fort		Franklin	29°56.4'N 85°0.7'W				
Neilson		Polk	27°40.7'N 81°30.1'W				
New Troy		Lafayette	30°0.4'N 83°0.8'W				
Newhall		Glades	26°51.1'N 81°7.4'W				
Newnansville		Alachua	29°48.5'N 82°28.6'W				
Newport		Wakulla	30°12.0'N 84°10.8'W				
Nittaw		Osceola	27°57.2'N 81°0.0'W				
Oakgrove		Hernando					
Okeelanta		Palm Beach	26°36.6'N 80°42.7'W				
Old Bethel		Okaloosa	30°47.5'N 86°36.2'W				
Old Providence		Union	30°0.9'N 82°33.6'W				
Old Town		Lake	29°2.2'N 81°25.2'W				
Old Venus		Highlands	27°4.0'N 81°21.5'W				Inhabited
Olympia		Martin	27°3.2'N 80°7.9'W				
Ona		Hardee	27°28.9'N 81°55.2'W				
Orange Center		Orange	28°23.7'N 81°30.2'W				
Orleans		Citrus	25°47.5'N 82°22.5'W				
Orsino		Brevard	28°31.6'N 80°39.8'W				
Ortona		Glades	26°48.7'N 81°18.9'W				
Osceola		Seminole	28°47.6'N 81°3.5'W	1916	1940		
Oslo		Indian River	27°35.2'N 80°22.8'W				
Osowaw Junction		Okeechobee	27°34.8'N 80°50.1'W				
Palma Sola		Manatee	27°30.7'N 82°37.9'W				Inhabited
Parmalee		Manatee	27°22.3'N 82°13.2'W				Inhabited
Parramore		Jackson	30°52.3'N 84°59.9'W				
Pembroke		Polk	27°47.2'N 81°48.3'W				Industrial
Pennsuco		Miami-Dade	25°53.7'N 80°22.7'W				
Perky		Monroe	24°38.9'N 81°34.3'W				
Peru		Hillsborough	27°52.7'N 82°19.1'W				
Peters		Miami-Dade	25°35.9'N 80°21.2'W				
Picture City		Martin	27°4.6'N 80°8.5'W				Inhabited
Pierce		Polk	27°50.1'N 81°58.3'W				
Pigeon Key		Monroe	24°42.2'N 81°9.3'E				
Pine Level		DeSoto	27°15.9'N 81°59.5'W				Inhabited
Pinecrest		Monroe	25°39.7'N 80°18.5'W				Inhabited
Pittman		Lake	28°59.8'N 81°38.6'W				
Pittsburg		Polk	27°39.2'N 81°30.1'W				
Poinciana		Monroe	25°36'41.7"N 81°08'00.2"W				
Popash		Hardee	27°30.8'N 81°41.8'W				
Port Inglis		Levy	28°59'39.9"N 82°45'39.4"W				
Port Leon		Wakulla	30°7.9'N 84°11.7'W				
Port Tampa		Hillsborough	27°51.8'N 82°31.7'W				Inhabited
Prairie Ridge		Okeechobee					
Providence		Union	30°0.2'N 82°32.9'W				
Punta Rassa		Lee	26°30.7'N 81°59.9'W				
Quay		Indian River	27°43.1'N 80°24.8'W				
Rattlesnake		Hillsborough	27°53.8 82°31.4'W				Tampa
Renfro Springs		Marion	29°3.4'N 82°28.4'W				
Ridgewood		Putnam	27°53.4'N 81°54.8'W				
Ringgold		Hernando	28°39.1'N 82°26.8'W				Inhabited
Rital		Hernando	28°31.3'N 82°13.0'W				part of Ridge Manor
Ritta Island		Palm Beach	26°43.3'N 80°48.3'W				
Rochelle		Alachua	29°35.8'N 82°13.1'W				Inhabited
Rollestown		Putnam	29.63 N 81.59 W				
Romeo		Marion	29°12.4'N 82°26.2'W				Inhabited
Rosewood		Levy	29°14.4'N 82°55.9'W				Inhabited
Runnymede		Osceola	28°15.9'N 81°14.7'W				
Rye		Manatee	27°30.8'N 82°22.1'W				Inhabited
Saint Annes Shrine		Polk	27°52′38.19″N 81°29′20.84″W				
Saint Catherine		Sumter	28°36.7'N 82°8.3'W				
Sampson City		Bradford	29°55.0'N 82°12.3'W				
Sand Cut		Palm Beach	26°57.1'N, 80°36.6'W				
Sandy		Manatee	27°16′25″N 82°06′56″W				Inhabited
Sardis		Manatee	27°17.0'N 82°12.0'W				Inhabited
Sears		Hendry	26°38.8'N 81°22.6'W				
Sherman		Okeechobee	27°12.6'N 80°45.2'W				
Shiloh		Brevard	28°46.0'N 80°46.6'W				
Silver Palm		Miami-Dade	25°33.1'N 80°26.7'W				Inhabited
Sisco		Putnam	29°31.14'N 81°37.31'W				
Slavia		Seminole	28°38.8'N 81°13.9'W				Inhabited
Slighville		Lake					
Sparkman		Charlotte					
Spray		Madison					
Spruce Bluff		Saint Lucie	27°15.0'N 80°19.85'W				
St. Francis		Lake	29°2.2'N 81°25.2'W				
St. Joseph		Gulf					
Stage Pond		Citrus	28°41.9'N 82°24.4'W				
Stanton		Marion					
Sumica		Polk	27°51.4'N 81°22.6'W				
Sweetwater		Hardee	27°24.6'N 81°42.2'W				
Tantie		Okeechobee					
Tarrytown		Sumter	28°33.3'N 82°0.1'W				Inhabited
Tasmania		Glades or Highlands					
Tiger Bay		Polk	27°45.6'N 81°50.9'W				
Tillman		Brevard	28°2.0'N 80°35.0'W				Palm Bay
Tohopkee		Osceola	28°13.5'N 81°4.6'W				
Torrey		Hardee	27°36.6'N 81°49.5'W				Inhabited
Traxler		Alachua	29°52.2'N 82°32.3'W				Inhabited
Troy		Lafayette	30°0.2'N 82°59.9'W				
Utopia		Okeechobee	27°1.9'N 80°41.8'W				
Vandolah		Hardee	27°30.9'N 81°55.6'W				
Velda Mound		Leon	30°30.4'N 84°13.19'W				
Venus		Highlands	27°4.0'N 81°21.5'W				Inhabited
Venus		Palm Beach	26°52.6'N 80°3.35'W				
Verna		Manatee	27°23.2'N 82°16.1'W				Inhabited
Viana		Citrus	28°54'N 82°27'W				
Vicksburg		Bay	30°19.5'N 85°39.9'W				
Viking		Saint Lucie	27°32.5'N 80°21.7'W				
Villa City		Lake	28°37.1'N 81°51.1'W				
Vineland		Orange	28°23.7'N 81°30.2'W				Inhabited
Vogt Springs		Marion	29°3.4'N 82°28.4'W				
Waterbury		Manatee	27°26.7'N 82°18.2'W				
Waveland		Martin	27°16.1'N 80°12.4'W				
Weedon Island		Pinellas	27°50.5'N 82°36.2'W				
Welchton		Marion	29°5.0'N 81°59.5'W				Inhabited
Welcome		Hillsborough	27°51.9'N 82°5.2'W				Industrial; Now Part Of Keysville
West Tocoi		Clay	29°51.0'N 81°37.4'W				
Willow		Manatee	27°38.6'N 82°20.8'W				Inhabited
Wilson		Brevard	28°38.6'N 80°41.8'W				Kennedy S. C.
Wiscon		Hernando	28°32.0'N 82°27.6'W				Inhabited
Yamato Colony		Palm Beach	26°24.6'N 80°5.4'W				
Yukon		Duval	30°14.1'N 81°41.9'W				Inhabited
Zana		Martin	27°7.2'N 80°37.1'W				
Zion		Palm Beach	26°27.7'N 80°3.5'W				Inhabited

- Some 19th-century Florida maps show longitude west of Washington (WW), which is approximately 77°2.8' west of Greenwich (WG).

== Gallery ==
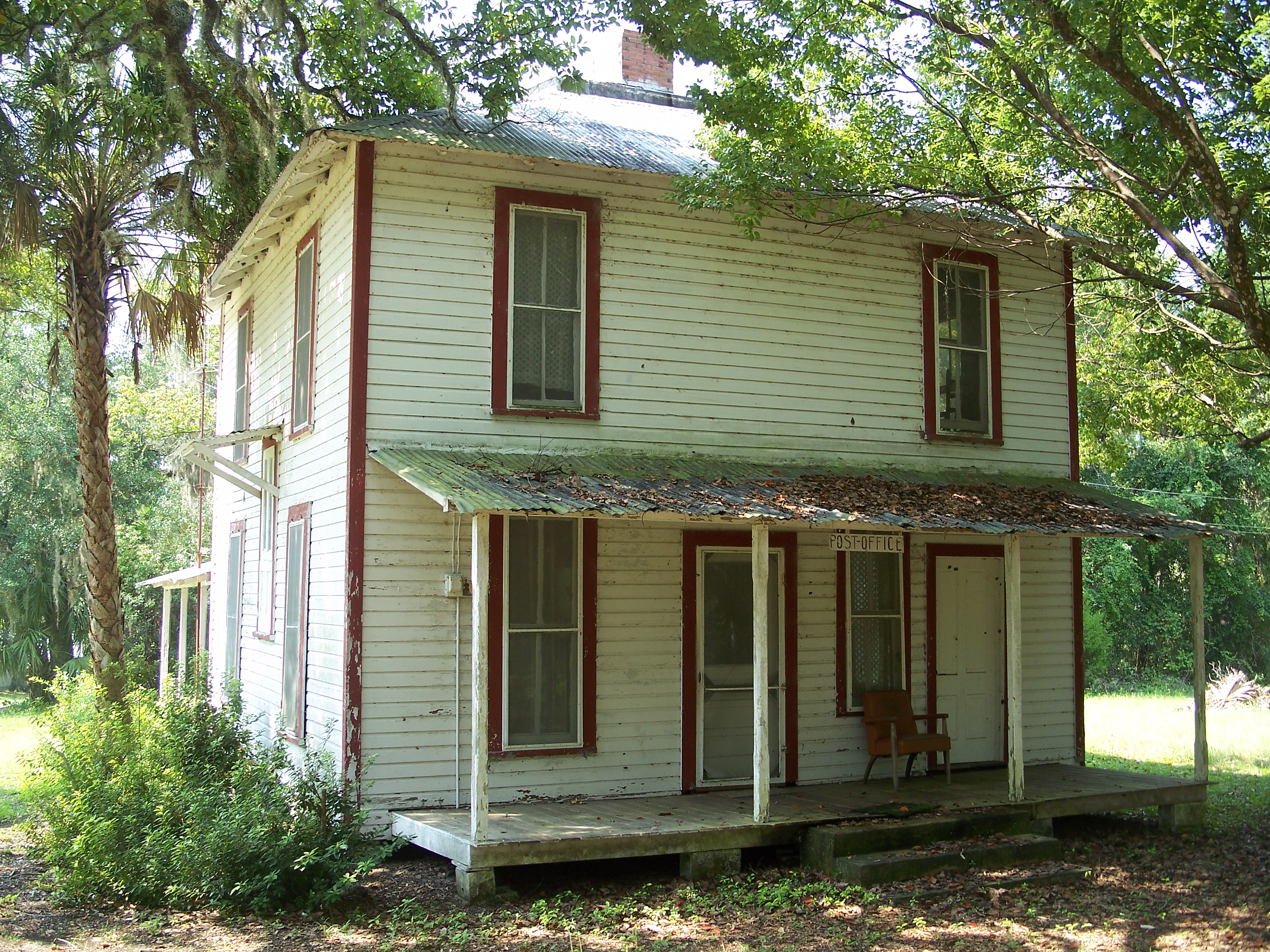
The former post office at Kerr City, Florida

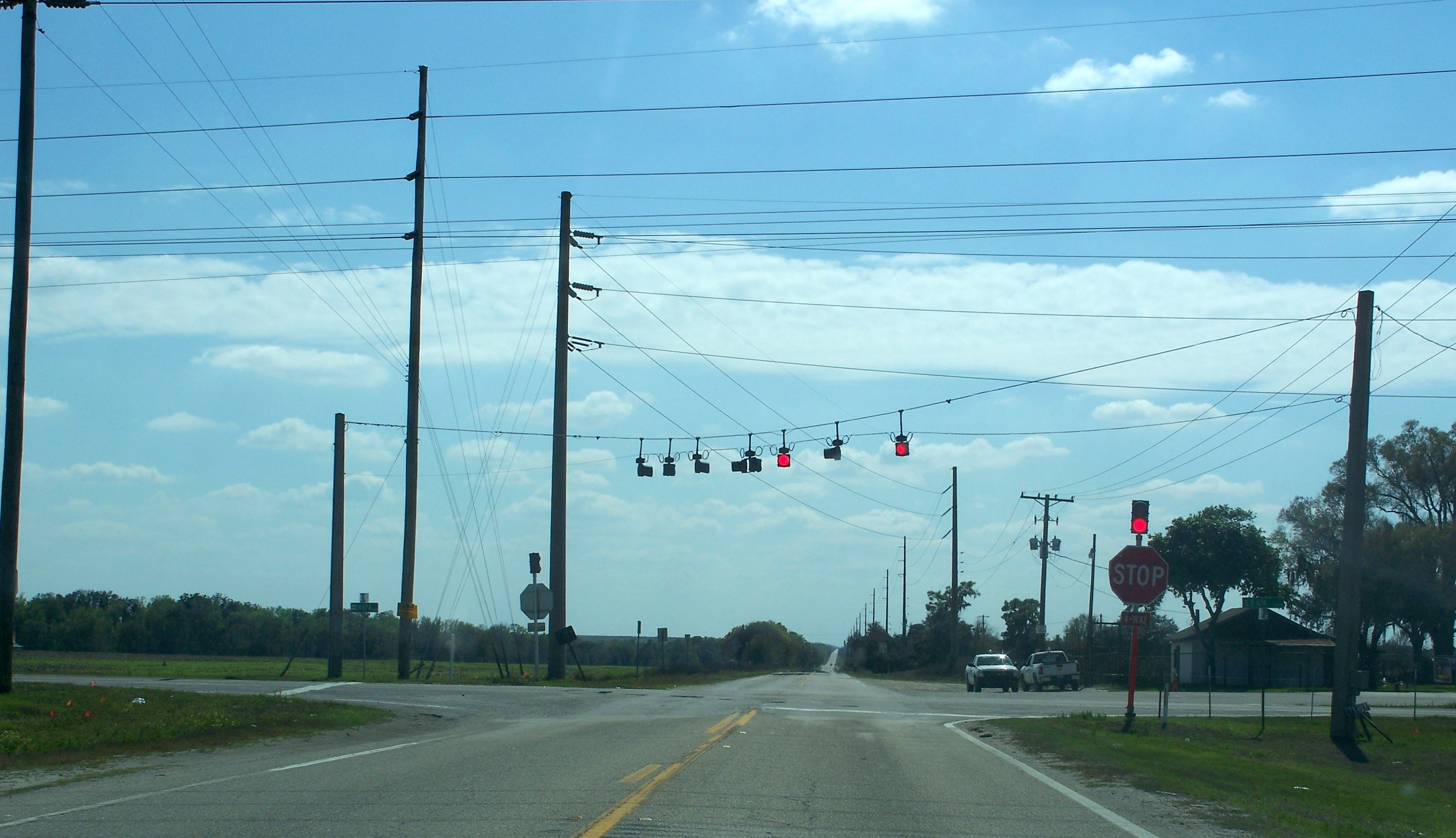
The intersection of SR 674/CR 39 at Fort Lonesome, Florida

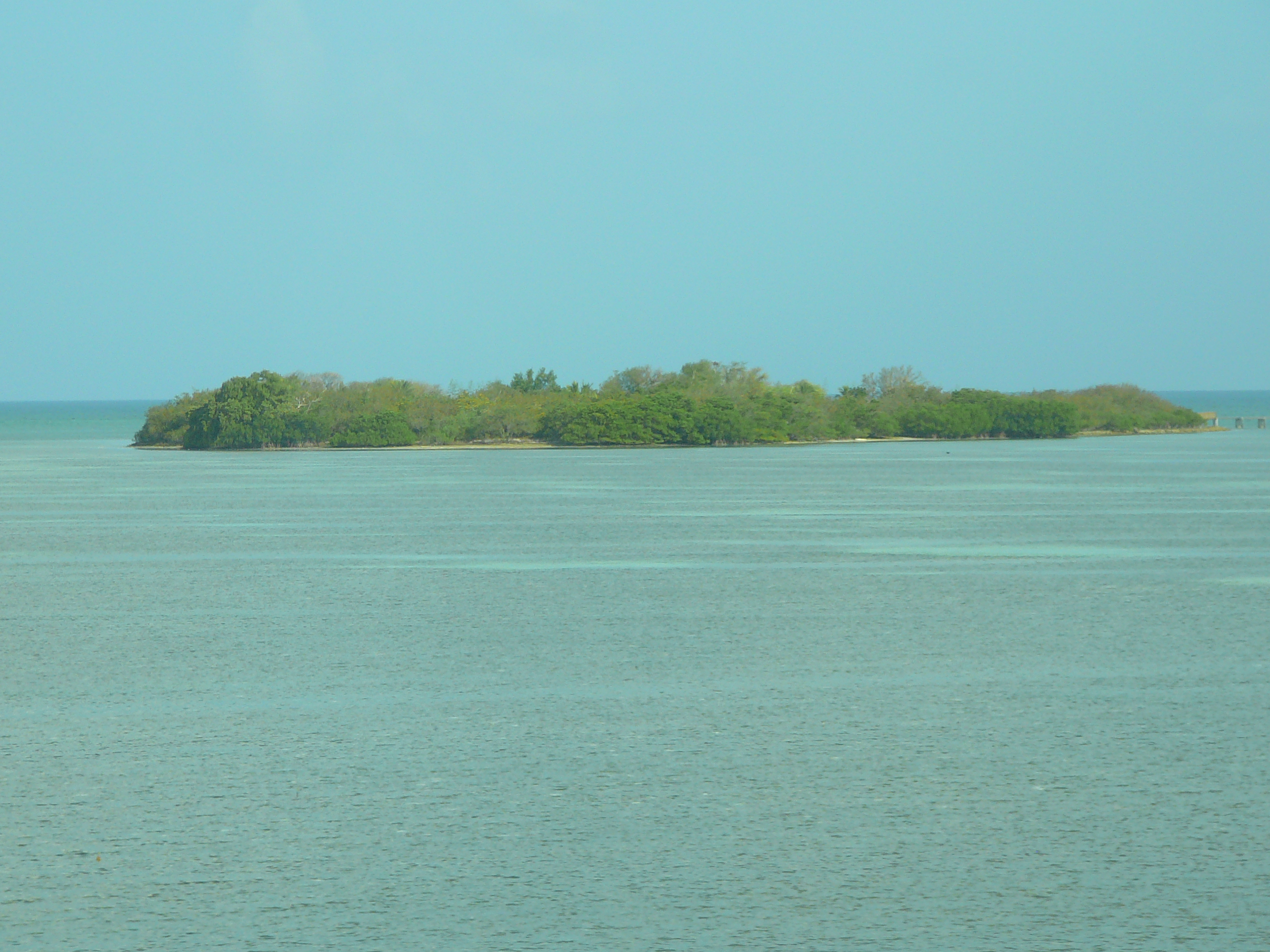
Indian Key, Florida, now uninhabited

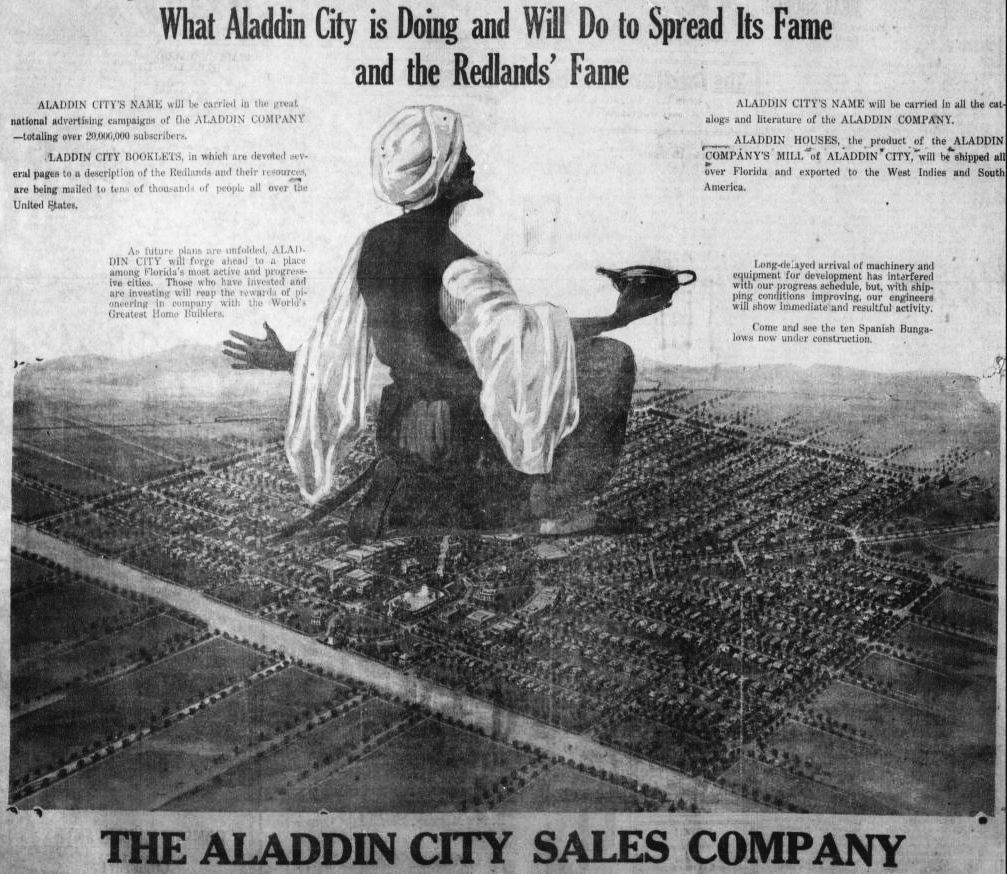
An advertisement showing the layout plans for Aladdin City, Florida, from the Homestead Leader

The power plant in Brewster, Florida, 1920

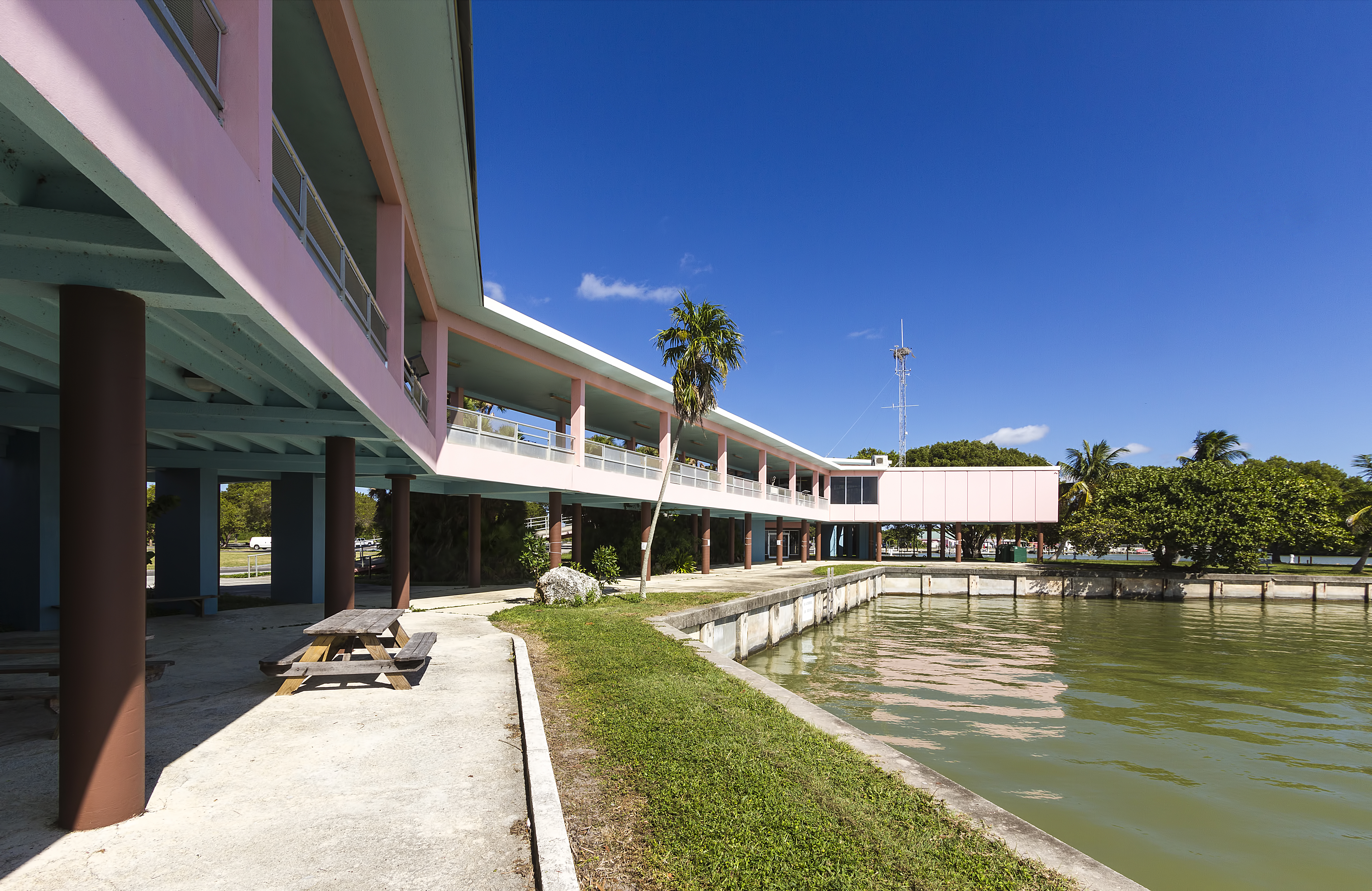
The visitor center for Flamingo, Florida
