= Pine Level =

Pine Level can refer to:

- Town of Pine Level, Autauga County, Alabama
- Pine Level, Coffee County, Alabama
- Pine Level, Montgomery County, Alabama
- Pine Level, DeSoto County, Florida
- Pine Level, Hillsborough County, Florida
- Pine Level, Santa Rosa County, Florida, a census-designated place
- Pine Level, Columbus County, North Carolina
- Pine Level, Johnston County, North Carolina
