= Chetwynd, Florida =

- Ghost Town
- Country: United States
- State: Florida
- County: Lake
- Founded: 1883

Chetwynd is a ghost town in Lake County, Florida just north of Fruitland Park, Florida. It was settled in 1883 by a group of British land company run by Granville Bryan Chetwynd-Stapylton, who was twenty-two years old at the time. The majority of settlers were English bachelors, sons of landed gentry, who came to make their fortune by growing and selling citrus. The Great Freeze resulted in the town being abandoned by many settlers. All that remains of the town is the Holy Trinity Episcopal Church in Fruitland Park founded in 1886.

== History ==
At the time of its founding, Chetwynd was a part of Sumter County, Florida, though, the land it sits on is now a part of Lake County, Florida.

== Citrus Industry ==
In the late 1800s, the news of a booming new industry was spread across Europe. This is how Chetwynd-Stapylton, a young man in London, came to develop a town across the ocean in Florida with his fellow business partners. This migration of land developers to Florida became known as "Orange Fever".

In the developing town, Stapylton built a learning center for other young men to come and learn about the citrus industry. These men, or apprentices, helped develop the grove business in Chetwynd even further by helping plant more and more groves.

The town of Chetwynd fell victim to catastrophic freezes in 1894 and 1899 that ultimately destroyed the citrus business there.
