= Pine Level, Florida =

Pine Level refers to three places in the U.S. state of Florida:

- Pine Level, DeSoto County, Florida
- Pine Level, Hillsborough County, Florida
- Pine Level, Santa Rosa County, Florida, a census-designated place
