= Bermont =

Bermont may refer to:

- Bermont, Territoire de Belfort, commune in France
- Bermont, Florida, ghost town in the United States
- Bermont Formation, geologic formation in Florida, United States
- Anthony Bermont (born 2005), French footballer

== See also ==
- Pavel Bermondt-Avalov (1877-1973), Russian officer and Cossack adventurer-warlord
- Bermontians, a pro-German White Russian military formation in Latvia and Lithuania
