= Arlington, Florida =

Arlington may refer to:

- Arlington (Jacksonville), a neighborhood of Jacksonville
- Arlington, Citrus County, Florida, an unincorporated community north of Inverness
