= Kismet, Florida =

- Ghost town
- Location within Florida Location within the United States
- Coordinates: 29°2.5′N 81°37.5′W
- Country: United States
- State: Florida
- County: Lake
- Founded: 1884

Kismet is a ghost town in Lake County, Florida, in an area which is now part of the Ocala National Forest. It was founded in 1884 by the Kismet Land and Improvement company and was a citrus town. During the late 1800s, the St. John's and Eustis Railroad had planned to extend a line into Kismet, but the Great Freeze drove many residents to leave. Nothing remains of the town today. The town is best known as the place where Elias Disney and his wife Flora were married. Their son, Walt Disney, visited as a child.

The community had a large, 50-room hotel known as Hotel Kismet, which was owned by E.R. Abbott. The hotel was purchased in 1910 by R.I. Collins and Dr. A.J. Hannah. It was then dismantled and moved from Kismet to Eustis, Florida.
