= Acton, Florida =

Coordinates: 28°3.2′N 81°56.0′W

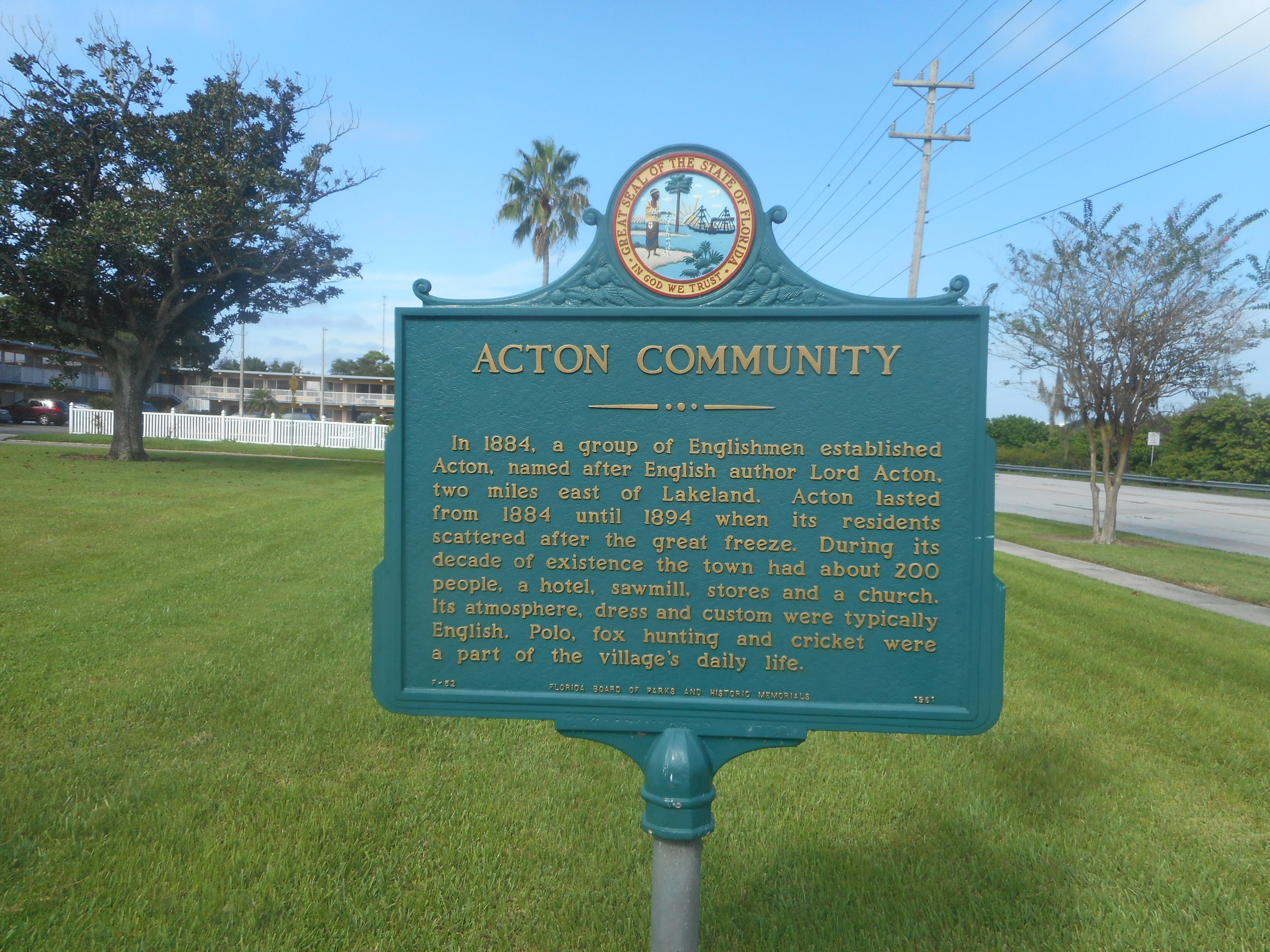
Historical marker for Acton within Interlachen Park, in Lakeland, Florida

Acton was a community in Polk County, Florida, United States. The town was situated two miles east of Lakeland, which it preceded. It was a settlement of English people from Great Britain. It was established in 1884 named for Lord Acton. The community began dispersing to Lakeland in 1889 and disappeared after the great freeze of 1894. A historical marker in Interlachen Park commemorates its history.

The South Florida Railroad advertised a route through the community. An episcopal church was built in the community and later moved to Lakeland.

== History ==
Acton was platted in 1884, and named for Lord Acton. A post office was established at Acton in 1884, and remained in operation until 1889. Construction of a railroad shifted business activity to nearby Lakeland, and the town's population dwindled.

== See also ==
- List of ghost towns in Florida
