= Kerr City, Florida =

Human settlement in Florida, United States

Coordinates: 29°22′13″N 81°46′59″W

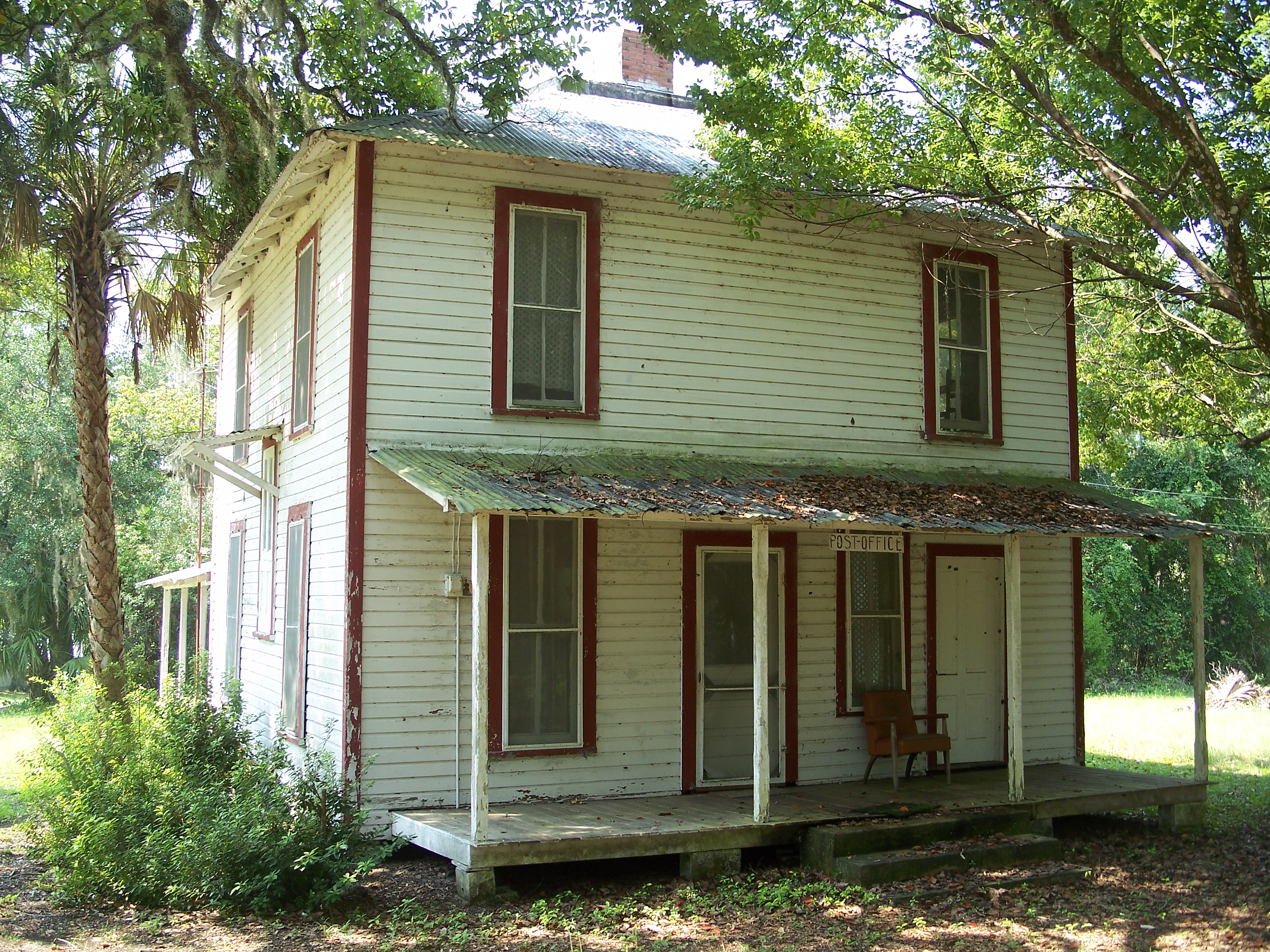
Former post office

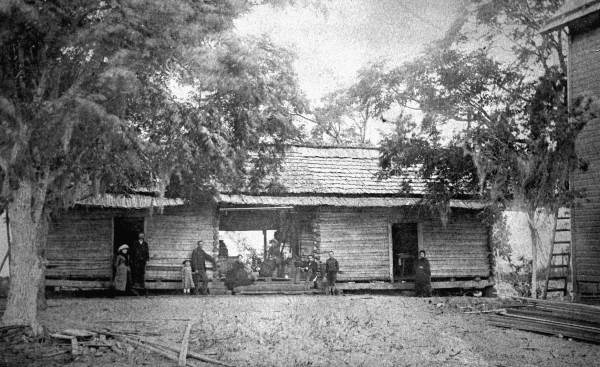
Log cabin home in Kerr City, Florida, 1884

Kerr City is a ghost town located in Marion County, Florida, United States. It lies on CR 316 approximately three miles west of SR 19, on the north shore of Lake Kerr.

== Description ==
Kerr City was the second town in Marion County, platted in 1884. The town grew to 100 residents, a hotel, sawmill, general store, pharmacy, school/church, and a post office. It served as the stage stop for travelers commuting from the St. John's River to Ocala. Originally a cotton plantation during the Civil War, it flourished as an orange-growing community. The community deserted the town after the freezes of 1894-95.

In 1884 there were 205 acres (0.83 km^{2}) and a platted 26-block town with streets such as Michigan, Indiana and Ohio. Junis Terry, a doctor from Chicago, and his wife arrived and built in 1885 the Lake Kerr House. This hotel was three stories high and was made of virgin pine. Despite the precautions of taking down all the surrounding trees, the hotel burned down in 1907, reportedly by arson.

The post office, established in 1884 and renamed Lake Kerr in 1888, was in operation until 1942. The founder, George Smiley continued to live in Kerr City when all the neighbors moved out after the freeze. He gradually bought most of the abandoned properties around him. By 1955 his son Alfred owned the entire town. More recently, the area has come to be owned by Arthur Brennan, a descendant of some of the original homesteaders. Brennan has renovated many of the old homes, now on the National Register of Historic Places, and rents them. As of September 2014, the town is fenced off and visits by the general public are no longer allowed.

The oldest Texaco "station" in Florida (1925) can still be found in pristine condition here, but now pumps unleaded gas.

== See also ==
- List of ghost towns in Florida
