= George F. Hall =

George F. Hall may refer to:

- George F. Hall, founder of Hall City, Florida
- George F. Hall, architect and partner in the firm Martin & Hall
