= Osowaw Junction, Florida =

Abandoned Settlement

Coordinates: 27°34′46″N 80°50′05″W

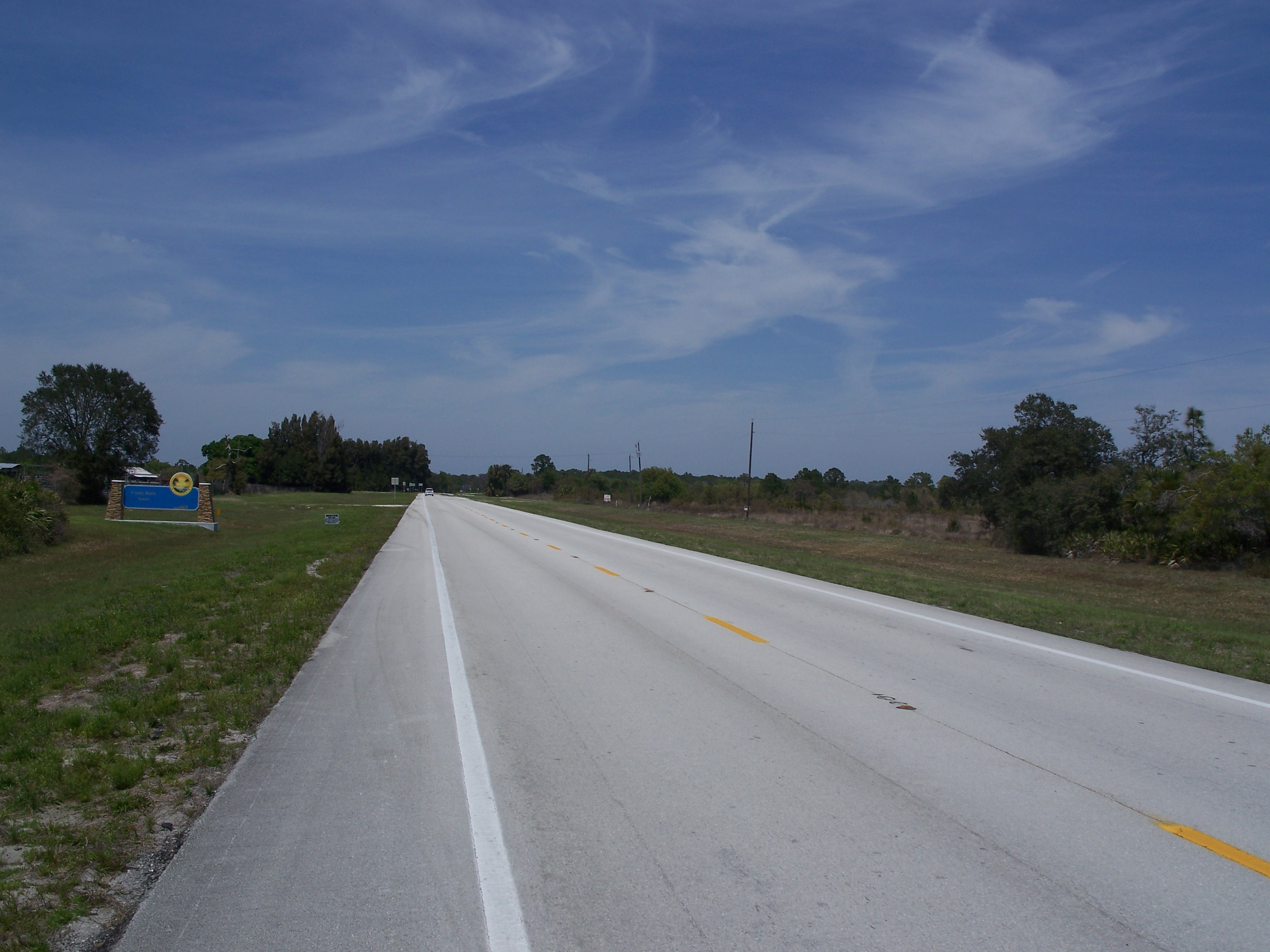
U.S. Route 441 as it runs through Osowaw Junction.

Osowaw Junction is a ghost town in Okeechobee County, Florida, United States located about 9 miles away from Yeehaw Junction. The current main road through the former community is US Route 441.

== Overview ==
Osowaw's name comes from the Seminole word for "bird". In 1914 a train station was built here several miles north of Fort Drum in the Kissimmee Valley Extension line of the Florida East Coast Railroad.The town had a stable growing population and by 1921 the town got a public school. Osowaw was a citrus town with tangerine and orange groves. The town vanished when the rail line was abandoned.

== See also ==
- List of ghost towns in Florida
