= Fort Drum (disambiguation) =

Fort Drum a U.S. Army military reservation and a census-designated place in Jefferson County, New York, United States

Fort Drum may also refer to:

- Fort Dalles (previously Fort Drum), a United States Army outpost located on the Columbia River at the present site of The Dalles, Oregon
- Fort Drum (Philippines), a heavily fortified island situated at the mouth of Manila Bay
- Fort Drum, Florida, a town in Okeechobee County, Florida, United States
