= Rye, Florida =

- Unincorporated community
- Rye
- Location within Manatee County, Florida
- Coordinates: 27°30′52″N 82°22′04″W
- Country: United States
- State: Florida
- County: Manatee
- Elevation: 10 ft (3.0 m)
- Time zone: UTC-5 (EST)
  - Summer (DST): UTC-4 (EDT)
- Area code: 941
- FIPS code: 12-62385
- GNIS feature ID: 290094

Rye is an unincorporated community in Manatee County, Florida. It was established as a fort during conflict with the Seminoles in the Third Seminole War and developed into a community with orange groves, cattle ranching, and a Manatee River crossing after the conflict. The 530 acre Rye Preserve is nearby in Parrish, Florida and includes the Rye Family Cemetery. There is a historical marker in the area commemorating the community's history.

== History ==
The community of Rye was named after Erasmus Rye, a Virginian who moved to Manatee County while fighting in the Third Seminole War. It began as a fort which served as protected housing for a small group of militia and their families. The mounted militia helped to capture Native Americans as part of the war effort. After the Third Seminole War, some of the militia's families remained at Rye, establishing orange groves and cattle ranching. The largest homestead belonged to the John Greene Williams family. After his marriage to Mary Williams, Erasmus Rye took over the Williams homestead and became the largest landowner in that area.

The developing Rye community was difficult to reach by road, but its residents were well known for their ability to navigate the Manatee River. For a period, Rye was the point of passage for residents in west Manatee County to cross the Manatee River while traveling to the county seat at Pine Level. In 1879 the first bridge across the Manatee River was built in Rye.

In 1882, Sam Mitchell, a cattle rancher from Tampa, moved to Rye with plans to develop a subdivision. He opened the community's first store. He applied for the community's Post Office to be named Mitchellville, which was rejected by the Postal Service due to the name having been used elsewhere in Florida. The area briefly became unofficially known as Mitchellville, but officially reverted to Rye by 1884.

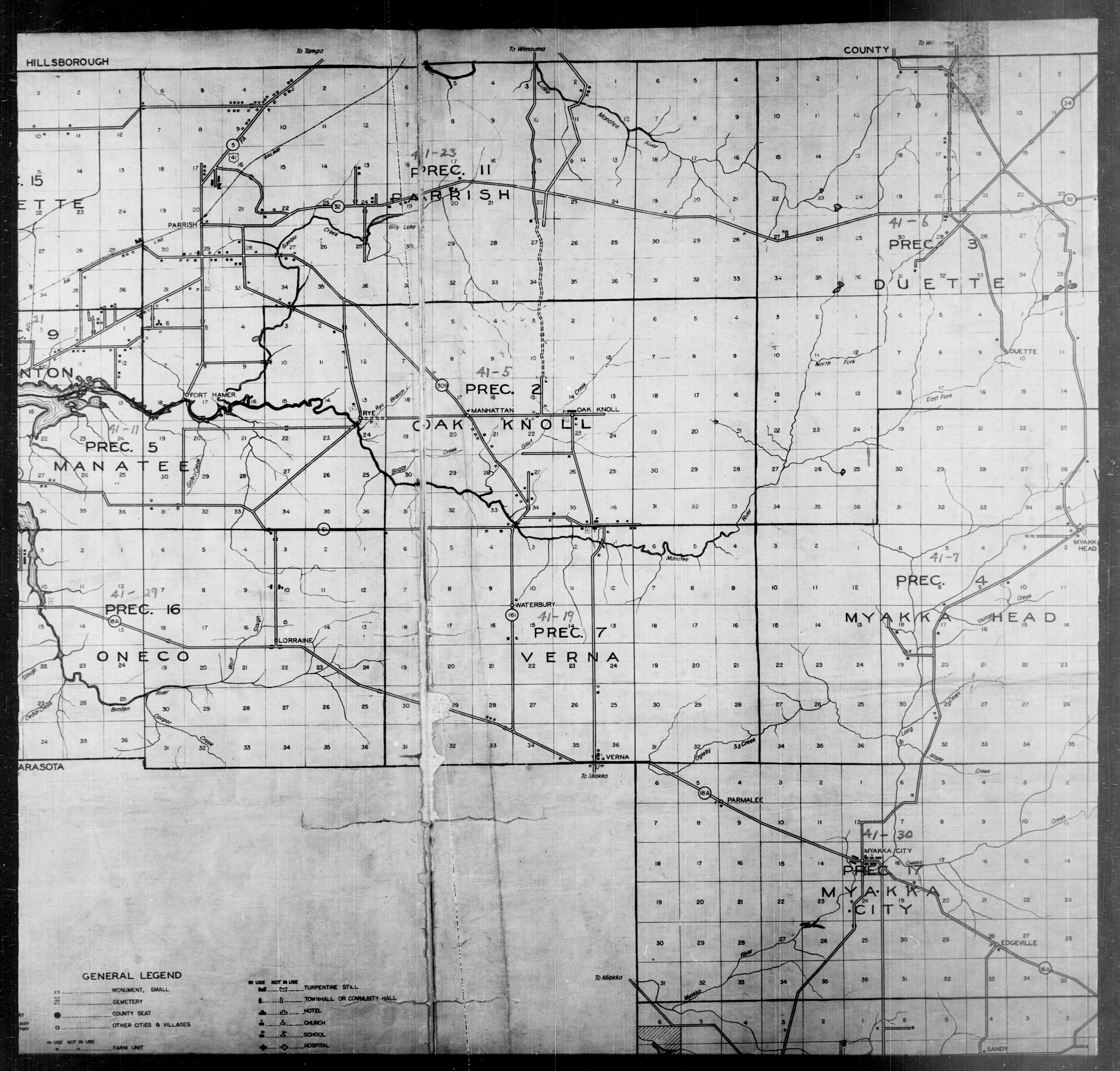
A 1940 US Census enumeration district map showing Rye.

By 1897, the population had grown to 72 families, which allowed a second store to open. At its peak, the community was home to a post office, sawmill, gristmill, school, and stores. However, as land transportation developed with the introduction of the railroad and automobiles to Manatee County in the early 20th century, river transportation further decreased, leaving Rye increasingly isolated. On January 3rd, 1929, the post office was closed and Rye's township was dissolved.

In 1988, the last remaining wooden structures which were the original Rye Home and its detached kitchen area were destroyed in a fire. The Rye Family Cemetery can still be found at Rye Preserve.
