= Apoxsee, Florida =

Ghost town in Florida, U.S.

Coordinates: 27°48′01″N 80°56′22″W

Apoxsee is a ghost town in Osceola County, Florida, United States.

== Overview ==
Apoxsee was a train depot that was along the Florida East Coast Railroad. The town was named Apoxsee in 1920 by JE Ingram the Florida East Coast Railroad vice president at the time. The town's name comes from the Seminole word apaksi which means tomorrow. Apoxsee also was a turpentine town that had a post office from 1928 to 1933. Soon the turpentine supply declined as was common with many Florida turpentine towns. Then the railroad service discontinued in 1947 showing there was no future to the town and was then abandoned.

== See also ==
- List of ghost towns in Florida
