= Ellaville, Florida =

Coordinates: 30.24°N 83.12°W

Ellaville
- Ghost Town
- Interactive map of Ellaville
- Country: United States
- State: Florida
- County: Suwannee County
- Founded by: George Franklin Drew
- Named after: The wife of George Franklin Drew's business partner, Ella Bucki.
- GNIS feature ID: 294754

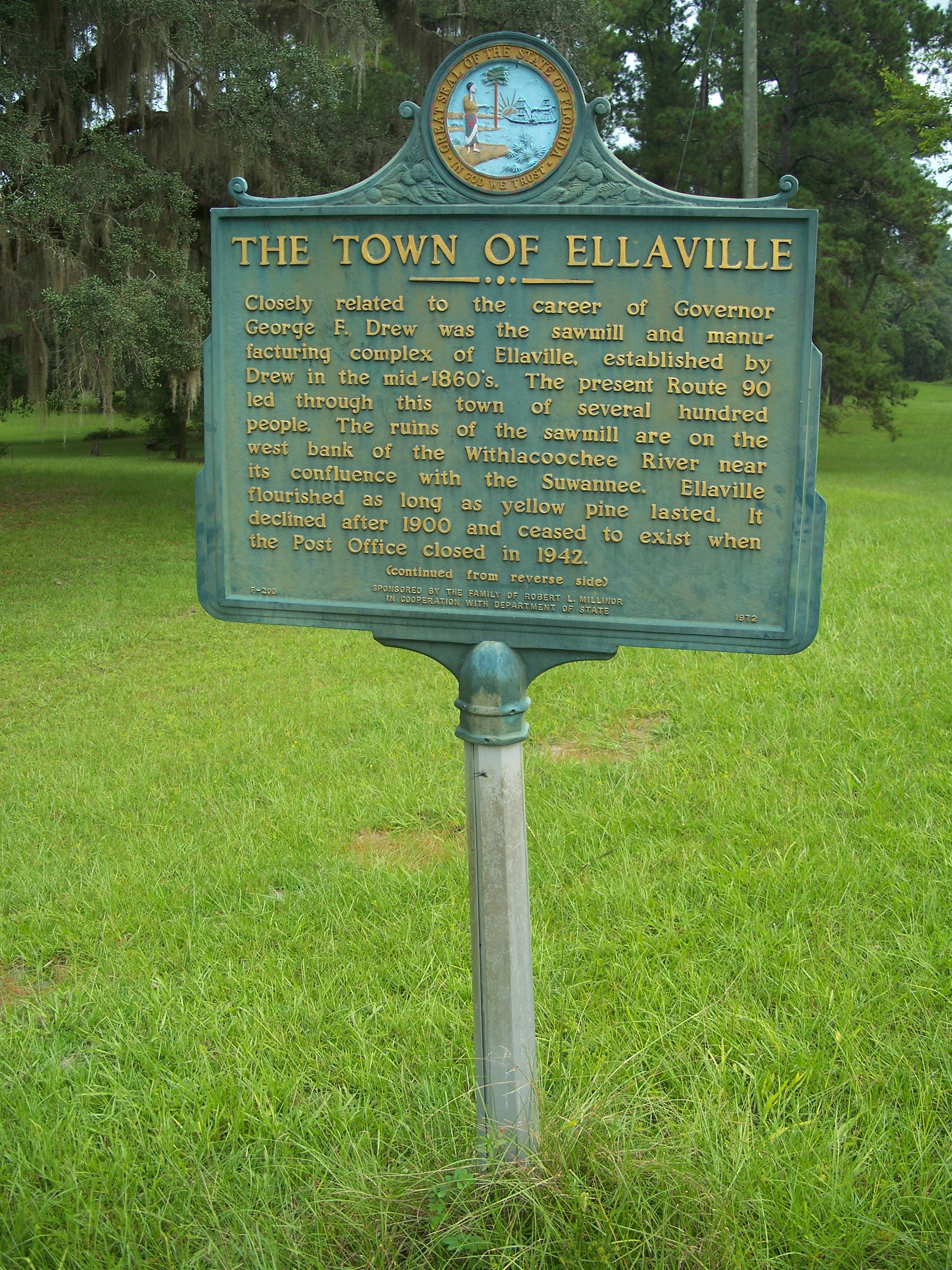
Historical marker

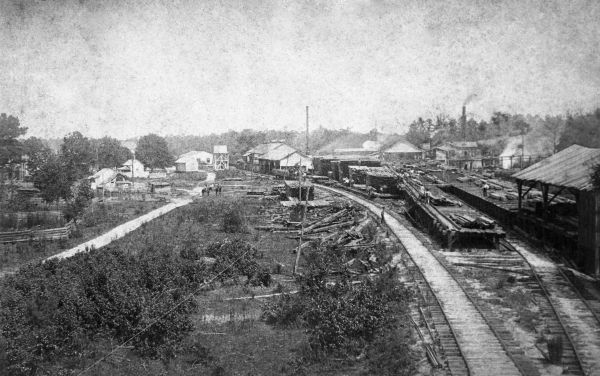
Suwannee Saw and Planing Mills, Ellaville, Florida, July 1884

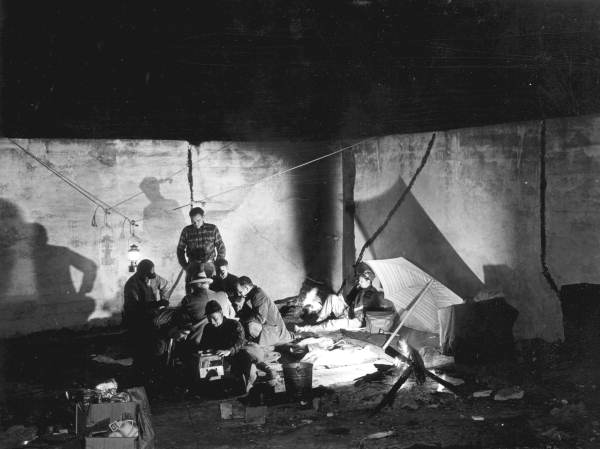
Men camping in a deserted pool in Ellaville in 1949

Ellaville, Florida is a ghost town in Florida located in Madison County, Florida, United States. Ellaville was located at the merging place of the Suwannee River and Withlacoochee River.

== History ==
Ellaville was founded in 1861 by George Franklin Drew a successful businessman and future governor of Florida. Franklin decided to build a mansion on the western banks of Suwannee River. The town was named Ellaville for honoring one of his slaves named Ella. He and Louis Bucki built a mill that employed over 500 people and was one of the largest in Florida at the time.

The Florida Railroad built a line to the town that had direct access to the mill. Soon after the town was booming and in its heyday in the early 1870s had a train station, two schools, two churches, a steamboat dock, masonic lodge, commissary and a sawmill. It was also involved in turpentine, railroad car building and logging.

The town had 1,000 residents at its peak. In 1876, George Franklin Drew was elected as Governor of Florida.

The town started to decline near the turn of the century after its mill burned down in 1898. Though it was quickly rebuilt, the number of pine trees declined.

Both rivers flooded and with the onset of the Great Depression, there was no future for the town and the post office closed in 1942. The Drew Mansion was then abandoned and vandalized for many years until it was burnt to the ground in the 1970s. The Florida Archives have photos of the mansion before and after its abandonment.

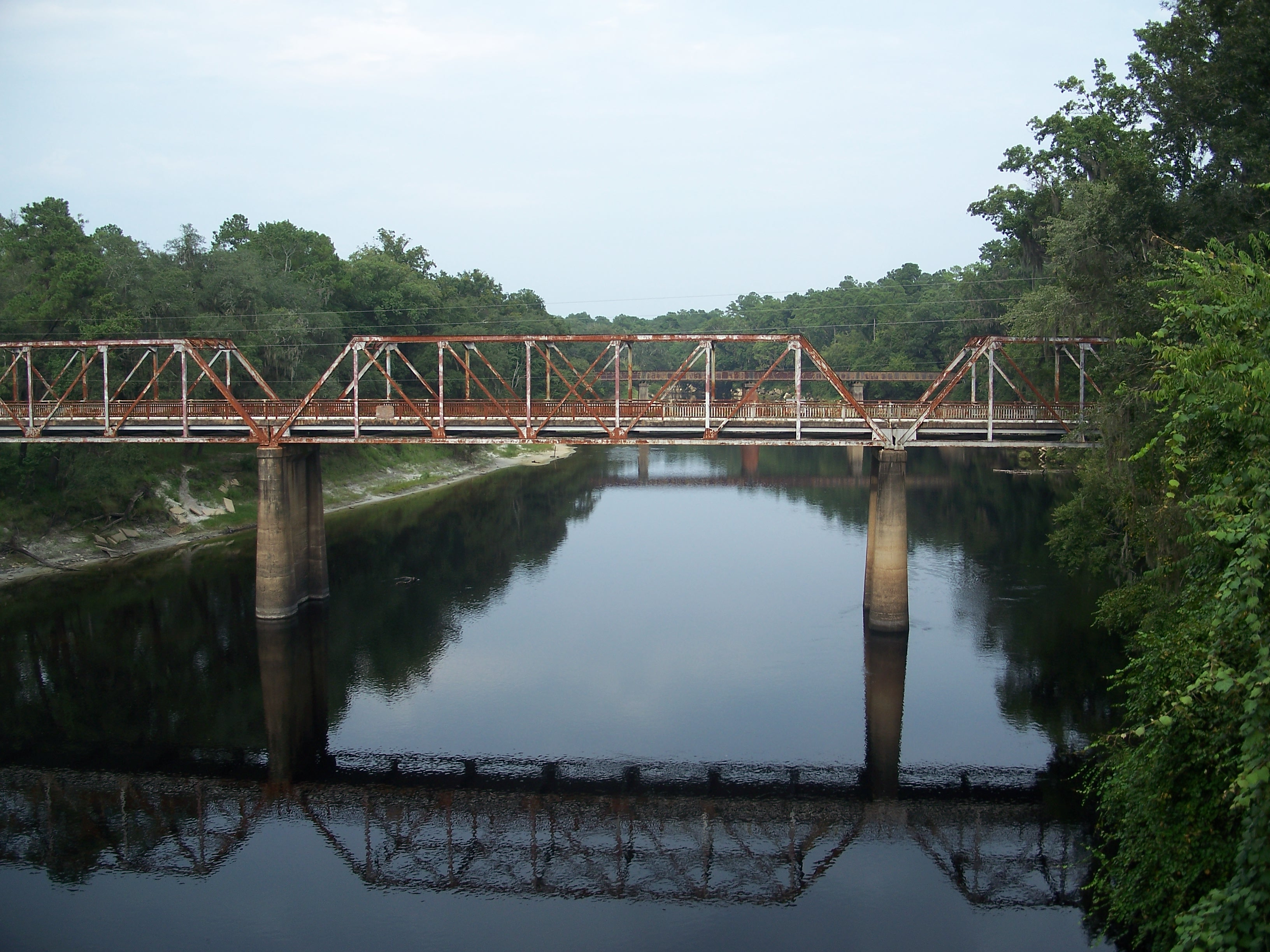
Suwanee River with the old steel truss US90 bridge reflected in it and a railroad bridge behind it

The Hillman Bridge, built in 1925 by the Federal Aid Project and designed by the RHH Blackwell Company of East Aurora, New York, was abandoned and replaced by a new bridge across the river in 1986.

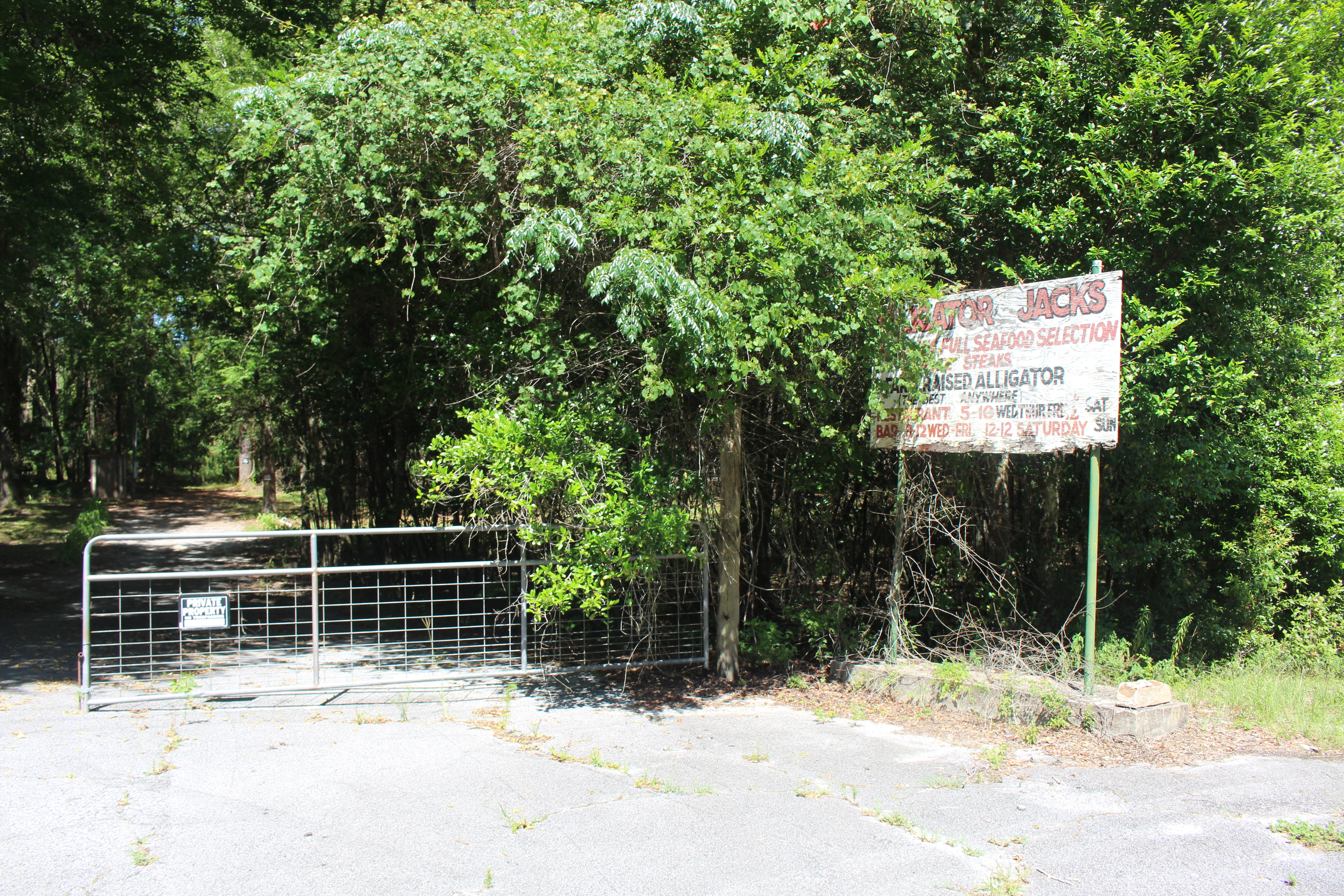
Alliator Jack's gate and signage in 2016

The Florida Archives have a photo of a store in Ellaville.

Ellaville Park and the Suwannacoochee Spring are in the area.

== See also ==
- Suwannee River State Park
