= Castor Town, Florida =

Community in Hillsborough County, Florida

Castor Town was an unincorporated community in Hillsborough County, Florida, United States on Egmont Key and had 20 buildings in the early 1800s.

== See also ==
- List of ghost towns in Florida
