= Villa City, Florida =

Coordinates: 28.6184°N 81.8505°W

Villa City, Florida Villa City
- Ghost town
- Interactive map of Villa City, Florida
- Country: United States
- State: Florida

Villa City is an abandoned community in Lake County, Florida. Founded by George T. King of Massachusetts, it featured dozens of homes and a post office in a citrus growing area in the late 19th century until a hard freeze in February 1895. A historical marker commemorates Villa City.

A master plan for a new community is underconsideration.

== See also ==
- List of ghost towns in Florida
