= Bay Harbor, Florida =

Ghost town in Florida, United States

Coordinates: 30.142°N 85.616°W

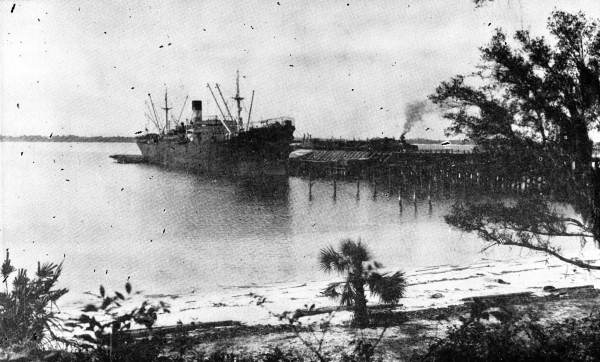
Export lumber business, Bay Harbor, Florida, 1910s

Bay Harbor is a ghost town in Bay County, Florida, United States.

== Overview ==
Bay Harbor was a small settlement mostly centered on the paper mill that was here at the site. Bay Harbor is currently part of the Panama City Paper Mill.

== See also ==
- List of ghost towns in Florida
