= Freedtown, Florida =

Former human settlement

Coordinates: 28°18′00″N 82°12′30″W

Freedtown (Earnestville) was a former community in Pasco County, Florida, located just south of Buddy Lake. The 19th century town was founded sometime prior to December 1886. It was a "freedtown", meaning it was a town populated mostly by freedmen. The town gradually ceased to exist after the Great Freeze of 1894–1895, and none of its buildings or its cemetery remain today. In 2004 the Pasco Board of County Commissioners and the Pasco County Historical Preservation Committee erected a historical marker at the intersection of Fort King Road and Bozeman Road stating that the community was about a mile west of it.

== See also ==
- List of freedmen's towns
