= Birdon, Florida =

- Ghost town
- Location within Florida Location within the United States
- Coordinates: 25°54′48″N 81°18′53″W
- Country: United States
- State: Florida
- County: Collier

Birdon was an unincorporated tomato growing settlement in southern Collier County, Florida, United States, located west of Ochopee. The industry town was established in 1930 by successful Miami businessmen, H.W. Bird and James Jaudon, following the construction of the Tamiami Trail. The name of the town is a combination of their two last names. Together they started the H.W. Bird Tomato Corporation.

Over 50 homes were built for farm-workers along Birdon Road, and by 1935 there were 342 Birdon residents.

The town began to suffer as a result of the Great Depression. By the 1940s it had completely disappeared.
