= Holy Trinity Episcopal Church (Fruitland Park, Florida) =

Historic church in Florida, United States

- U.S. National Register of Historic Places
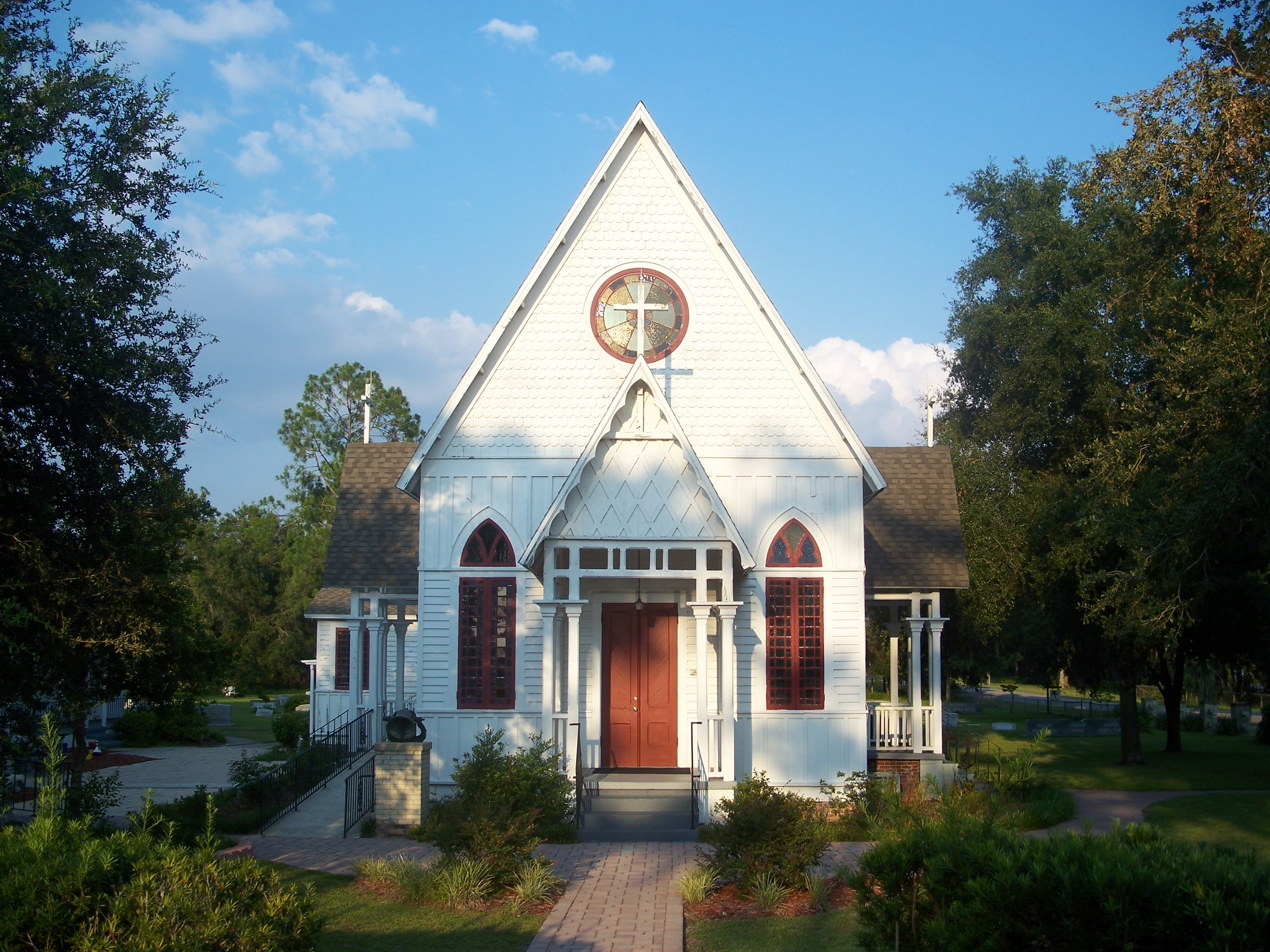

- Location within Florida Location within the United States
- Location: 2201 Spring Lake Road, Fruitland Park, Florida
- Coordinates: 28°52′38″N 81°55′1″W
- Built: 1888
- Architect: J. J. Nevitt
- Architectural style: Gothic Revival
- NRHP reference No.: 74000646
- Added to NRHP: December 27, 1974

Holy Trinity Episcopal Church, a historic Carpenter Gothic church located at 2201 Spring Lake Road, in Fruitland Park, Florida, is listed on the U.S. National Register of Historic Places.

== History ==
As Dorothy Goodnoh Paddock noted in the Forward of In the Beauty of Holiness—a History of Holy Trinity Church, the history of Holy Trinity is a story "of sturdy faith, stable tradition and spirited optimism".

Holy Trinity's ministry started in 1886, when much of Florida was still very much pioneer country. Throughout the 1880s, many groups of settlers from the British Isles came to Central Florida to seek their fortunes.

One such group of about 80 Englishmen put together by Grenville Chetwynd Stapylton, head of Stapylton & Company, settled on 160 acres (0.65 km^{2}) of land around what is now Zephyr Lake in Fruitland Park. The land had been purchased from Henderson Tanner, a freed slave, for $250. The settlers built a large boarding house on the lake called Zephyr Hall, as well as a large stable. They reportedly enjoyed a carefree bachelor lifestyle, complete with dances, parties, horse-racing and hunting. Rumor even had it that some of the younger men were becoming too carefree and in need of a sobering influence.

As noted in Holy Trinity's original Vestry minute book: "The want of an Episcopal Church and clergyman in the English Colony ... had been for some time felt, and a movement had been made to obtain subscriptions to erect a church in the colony." Their efforts to raise funds for a church were successful and Holy Trinity Church was constructed in 1888 for $2150.

The construction style, known as "Florida" or "carpenter" gothic, was a modification of an English style adapted to the materials and conditions of the time and area. Sturdy and well constructed, the church remains in service to this day.

In 1889, a Lych-Gate was added to provide a resting place for the bier and pall-bearers before the clergyman accompanied the funeral procession to the burial site. Similar to those found in Anglican and European churchyards, it is one of only two in Florida.

During the next 116 years, Holy Trinity would experience many ups and downs, just as the State of Florida and its citizens did. But through the hard economic times, especially those brought on by the citrus freezes, Holy Trinity's doors remained open.

In August 1952, the Church Vestry and Guild voted to take whatever steps "were necessary for this mission to become a parish" That goal was realized nearly 13 years later when Holy Trinity Church was received into full parish status during the May 1965 Diocesan Convention.

In recognition of its architectural and historical significance and to help encourage its preservation, the Church was placed on the National Register of Historic Places on September 30, 1975.

Holy Trinity took a major step in January 2005 in reshaping its future when it established All Saints Chapel, a second worship site along the rapidly growing Highway 27 corridor between Leesburg and Clermont. The new chapel has been growing steadily since its first service, Easter Sunday 2005.

== Gallery ==
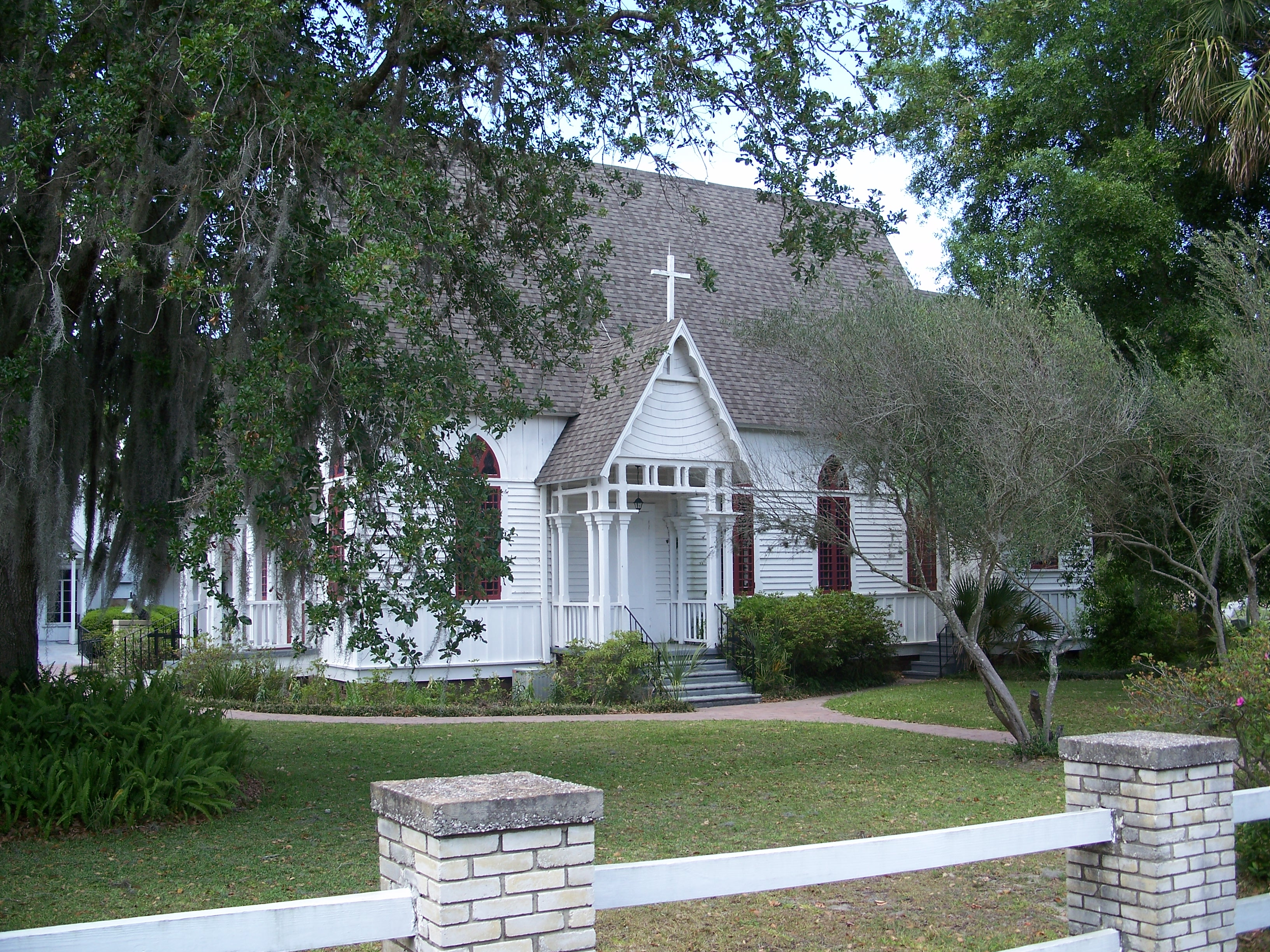
Side view

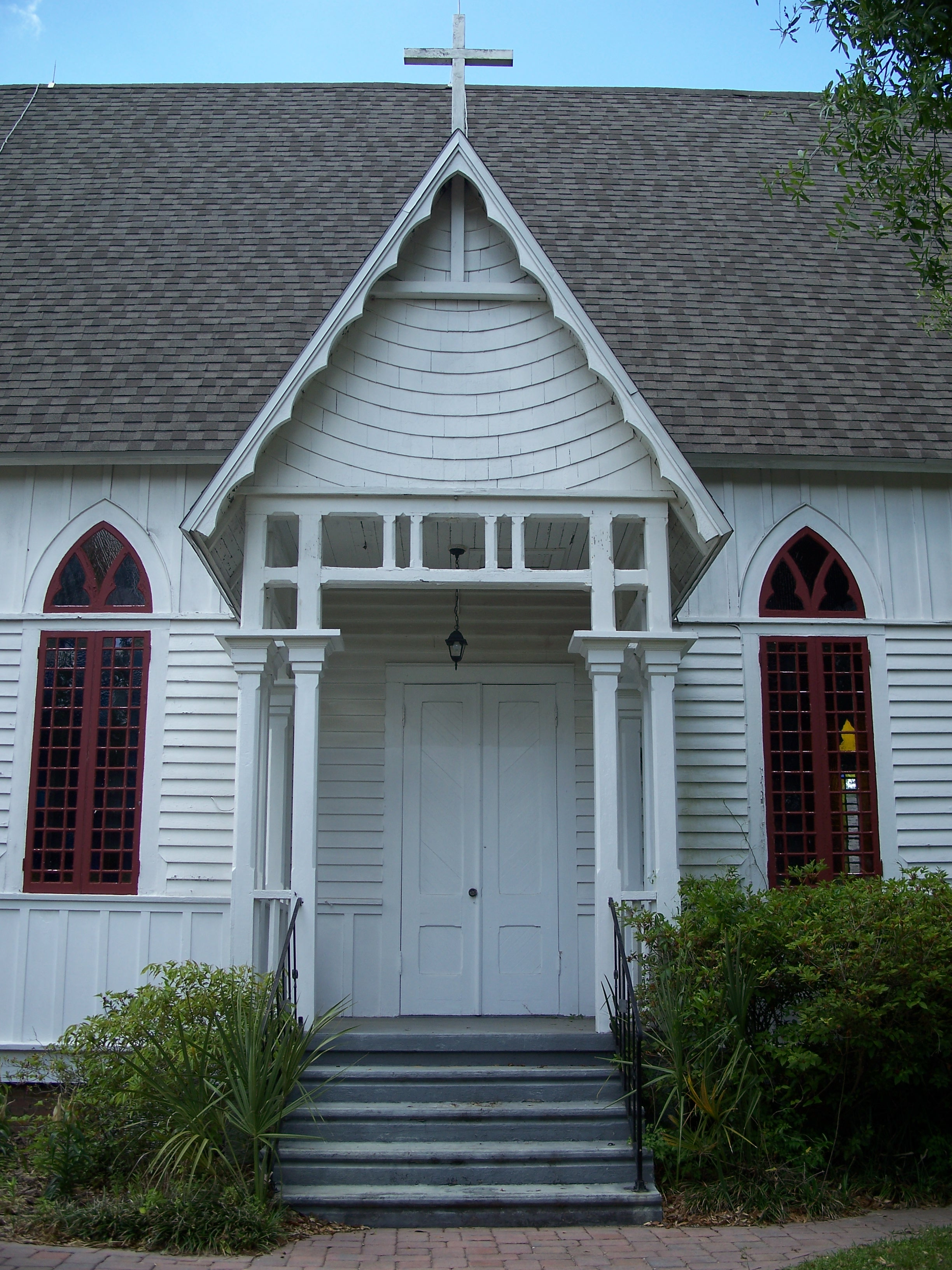
Side entrance detail

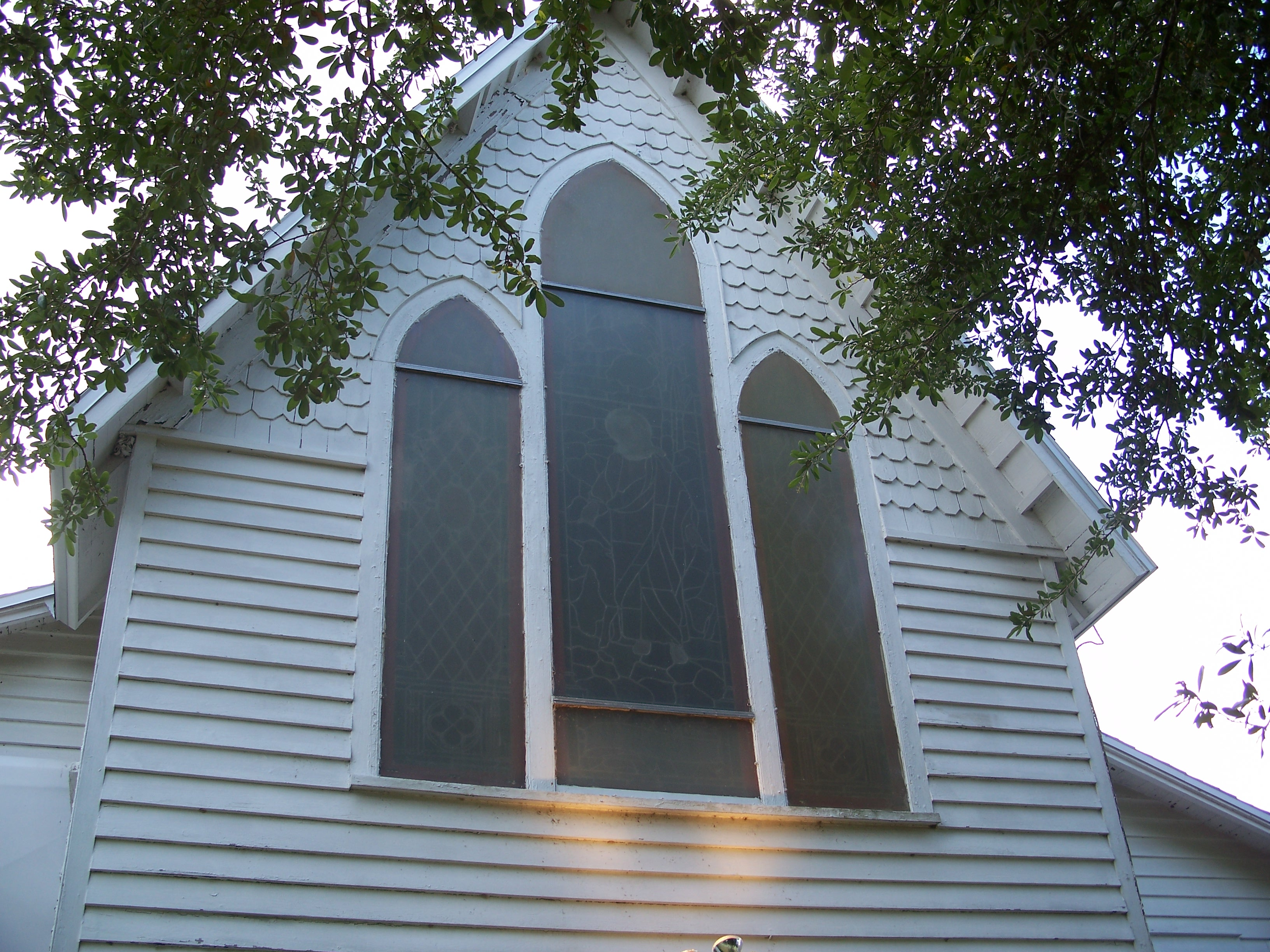
Rear detail

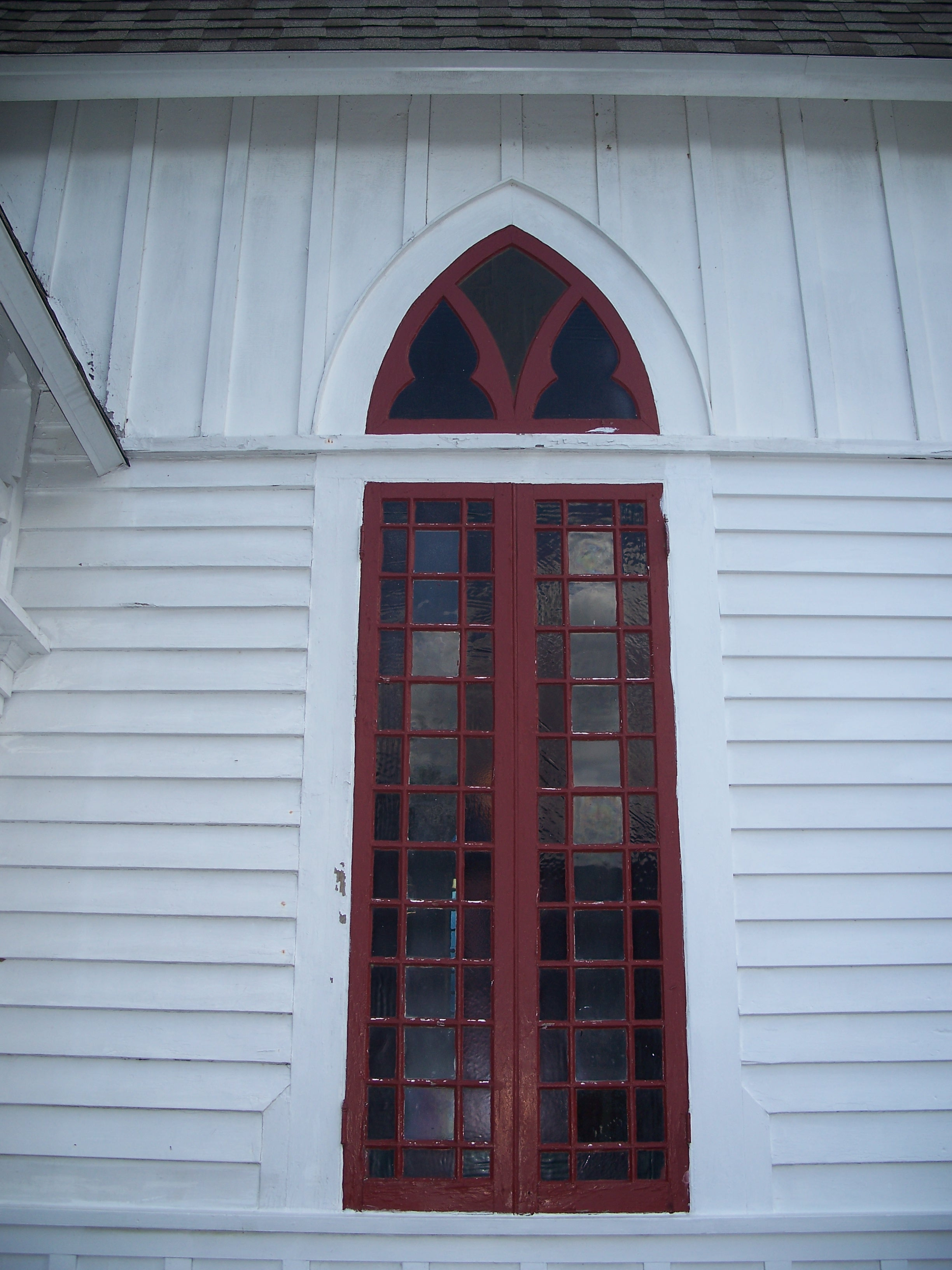
Window detail
