= Hall City, Florida =

Hall City
- Former community
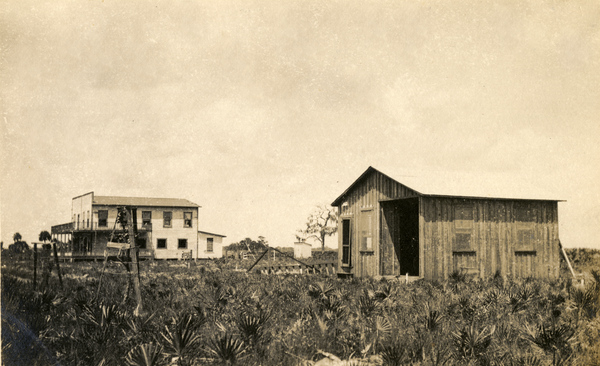
- Scene at a farm at Hall City, 1915

- Location within Florida
- Coordinates: 26°52′42″N 81°19′35″W
- Country: United States
- State: Florida
- County: Glades
- Established: 1910
- Founder: G. Barton Hall
- Elevation: 33 ft (10 m)
- GNIS feature ID: 294794

Hall City is a former community established in what is now Glades County, Florida, during 1910 by Rev. George F. Hall, a retired Disciples of Christ minister living in Chicago, Illinois. Built and run locally by Rev. Hall's son, G. Barton Hall, from 1910 until approximately 1925, Hall City was to have been a "temperance town" (i.e., free of alcoholic beverages) and was to be the site of proposed "Hall University". However, the town failed and the bulk of the land was purchased by the Lykes Brothers, who still own the original site.

Hall sold land through the mail and wrote his own advertisements. Most land was bought from people all over the country, including Alaska. Students who wanted to attend the new university wrote to a realtor out of Moore Haven, Daniel Lence, to buy land in the burgeoning community.

By 1917, Hall City was a "flourishing community" of 100 hundred residents, featuring a hotel, store, and "several large bungalows." W.H. Foote, Tom Smith, John J. Hess, and Carl Beckmire were some of the earliest settlers. The post office was run by Hall's son, Barton Hall. The mail was delivered to the post office, by Oliver Bethey, from LaBelle. Hall also named the streets, such as "Chicago Avenue" and "Illinois Avenue."

Traveling to Moore Haven from Arcadia was considered "a full day's hard trip," though having the Hall City hotel as a rest stop.

S.C. "Sonny" Stalls helped his father move the sidewalks from Hall City to Moore Haven.

In 1985, only "a fine flowing well," the city's water source, was left after the city was abandoned in 1920. The deeds to the lots were left to the heirs of its citizens, "scattered all over the United States." Heirs contacted real estate offices and the Glades County Courthouse to find out land values, only to discover they had "very little value."

== Rev. George F. Hall ==
Rev. George F. (Franklin) Hall was born on February 23, 1864, on the family farm just outside Clarksville, Iowa. He was the son of farmer, John Robert Hall and Mary Jane Barnard. He was one of five other children, four girls and one boy. George eventually went to Drake University and considered becoming a newspaper reporter.

After the death of his mother in the early 1880s decided to enter the ministry instead. He married the church organist, Laura Woods, at his first congregation in Kansas. The Halls had three children, Paul Lyman Hall, George Barton Hall and Wendell Woods Hall. They moved from town to town, finding jobs, through the midwest. The family lived in Chicago during the World's Fair of 1893 and 1900. For a few years, they moved to Decatur, Illinois between 1893 and 1900.

After preaching for a few years at a couple of different midwestern congregations of the Disciples of Christ, Hall formed a partnership with his brother-in-law and began holding meetings in various cities for a few years. After falling ill from exhaustion in the early 1890s, Hall, his wife and two sons, Paul and Barton, lived in Chicago during the time of the World's Fair, an event he wrote about in articles submitted to various Disciples-oriented publications, while he pastored a small congregation. Hall left Chicago and took a position in Decatur, Illinois, at a Disciples church, where his preaching and methods eventually resulted in a split of the congregation. In 1902, Hall left Decatur and took his family back to Chicago where he preached at what he called the Christian Tabernacle until 1910. Hall was rather unusual in that, while preaching, he spent a great deal of time developing side businesses and investments as well as becoming a published author on Christian themes. As a result, he was able to purchase the large house of a business executive in Chicago.

Dr. Hall (by 1910 he had earned some sort of degree at a local Bible College in the Chicago area) began to look for other business opportunities in the South. He and a number of investors purchased property in Western Louisiana, bordering Texas, with the idea that the land was to be used for lumber and mining. Unfortunately, Hall had used a local attorney in the land purchases who, behind Hall's back, had deeded significant portions of the property to friends, causing the collapse of the project and great financial loss to Hall and the other investors. He sued in an attempt to recoup his losses, but the Louisiana courts sided with his opponent in the end.

According to some of the sermons published by Dr. Hall towards the end of 1909, he had had big plans for his Chicago congregation, including the building of a massive church building that would have included "baths" and a treatment facility for people with epilepsy (his eldest son was one), but apparently the congregation must not have agreed with him, as he retired in 1910 from the ministry and devoted himself to pursuing yet another land deal, this time in Florida.

"George retired from his last church in Chicago in 1910 to devote himself to the Hall City project. His eldest son, Paul, was severely brain-damaged and epileptic; the middle son, Barton, went to Florida in 1910 after graduating from the University of Chicago High School to run the Hall City project, and Wendell, a constant behavioral challenge, eventually became a famous pioneer in radio during the Twenties."

Hall envisioned the town starting with farmers, who purchased land from him, settling in his "temperance town", which would draw merchants, then eventually students to his "Hall University" which would help with student tuition, in part, by having students work in grapefruit and orange groves surrounding the campus.

"George died on September 15, 1925 in Chicago from heart failure. His various business projects had failed and his son Barton was told at the funeral by George's brother, a Federal Judge in Iowa, that his father had died bankrupt."

Hall was tried and convicted of fraud and died in jail.

== G. Barton Hall ==
A major issue was exactly who would be traveling to Florida to be the on-site manager. Rev. Hall's oldest son, Paul Lyman Hall, had epilepsy and severe mental disabilities, his youngest son, Wendell Woods Hall, was still in grade school, and Rev. Hall himself would be busy traveling the country giving speeches to possible investors and farmers. The answer was in Rev. Hall's eighteen-year-old son, G. Barton (Bart) Hall, a 1910 graduate of the University of Chicago's high school program. Bart, born in 1892, was a handsome young man who had transferred to the University high school for his senior year and played on the school baseball team as well as in the Church League basketball team for the Christian Tabernacle. Bart loaded up a Ford Model A customized as a camper and traveled about the Midwest to visit various relatives before heading down to Florida to begin the process of carving a town out of the palmetto scrub in what was certainly a pioneer area of the State.

Bart Hall lived on the second floor of what was either a hotel or a boarding house in LaBelle, Florida (according to a picture taken from his window in 1910-1911) while he started making plans to develop the Hall City site. According to other pictures taken during this early period, Bart spent time in Fort Myers, Florida and took sightseeing trips to the Everglades to see the Seminole Indians. Rev. Hall, various relatives and a girlfriend from Chicago wrote letters and postcards to Bart, detailing business issues and family problems; Rev. Hall wrote about successes and failures on the road trying to drum up investors and possible inhabitants of the new town, while an aunt in Kansas detailed their problems with Bart's older brother, who was in a "foul air" during the Christmas of 1911, but continued, in her mind, to make progress despite his severe disabilities.

Bart Hall, who had an early interest in photography while growing up in Chicago, documented some of the early progress of Hall City with a Kodak "Picture Postcard" folding camera, so-called because the negative produced was roughly the same size as a postcard (approximately 4x6"). He placed some of the pictures into a "pitch book" or album that was used to "pitch" land sales to the interested willing to make the long trip to Florida and the Hall City development. Hall put very detailed captions on each picture, showing events and individuals in the history of the small town.

While Bart Hall continued to work on clearing the land for Hall City, he also traveled about the South Florida region seeking investors. It was during one of those trips that he met a young woman, Bertha Ruhl, the daughter of a couple of itinerant newspaper editors known as "Ma" and "Pa" Ruhl and married her shortly thereafter. Their first son, George, was born at "Cozynook Farm", Bart's property at Hall City, with Rev. Hall in attendance and young George was later referred to as the "King" and other Hall City children as his "Court".

Bart built and ran the Hall City Hotel and the Hall City Mercantile Company. His younger brother, Wendell, who was a bit of a behavioral problem for his parents, ran away from a boarding school and made his way to Hall City before the outbreak of World War I and worked for a short time for his brother until arrangements were made for his return to Chicago. Wendell later became a well-known songwriter and entertainer in the 1920s, being mainly remembered today for popularizing the tune "It Ain't Gonna Rain No Mo'".

Wendell worked in Hall City "until he had enough money to return north, where he wrote and recorded music."

As World War I approached, land sales and profits for Hall City shrank and Bart had to move to Jacksonville for a time to work for a company building concrete barges. Bertha obtained her teaching certificate so that she could teach music, as she was an accomplished organist. A second son, William Ruhl Hall, was born August 30, 1918, in Chicago during a family visit. The situation did not improve during the post-World War I era in Florida and the plans for Hall City collapsed.

Rev. Hall died in Chicago in February, 1925 of heart disease, with some questions being raised as to the legality of the land sales and calls for a criminal investigation by some of the investors. When Bart traveled to Chicago he was taken aside by his uncle, a Federal Judge in Iowa and his brother Wendell, by now a famous entertainer and recording artist, and was told that his father was bankrupt and that he would receive nothing from the estate. In fact, Wendell had to purchase the family house on the courthouse steps in a sale to be able to salvage some of the furniture and possessions to be able to resettle his mother in Lawrence, Kansas.

The remainder of Hall City was sold in bits and pieces, mainly for failure to pay taxes. The fledgling Lykes Bros. Corporation purchased most of the property, purchasing the last lot from Bart's brother-in-law in early 1970. Bart worked for Standard Oil for a time, reviving staid sales in his district, only to have the job given to a relative of a Standard Oil board member. He then ran a gas station for a few years, then opened up a Pepsi-Cola distributorship in 1940. Bart and his son William ran the distributorship with three trucks until William enlisted in the United States Army Air Corps shortly before Thanksgiving, 1941. Wartime rationing of gas, tires and sugar caused Bart to lose another promising business. In 1944, Bart and Bertha purchased a house in Sarasota, Florida and he worked selling ads for the local newspaper across the South. Bart died of a cerebral hemorrhage in 1947 during a business trip in Eastman, Georgia.

== See also ==
- List of ghost towns in Florida
