= Manhattan, Florida =

Manhattan
- Unincorporated community
- Location of Manhattan in Manatee County, Florida
- Coordinates: 27°30′27″N 82°19′07″W
- Country: United States
- State: Florida
- County: Manatee
- Elevation: 72 ft (22 m)
- Area code: 941
- GNIS feature ID: 295427

Manhattan was a proposed city in a development that was located in northern Manatee County, Florida near the present-day town of Parrish during the Florida land boom in the 1920s. The town was intended to be the centerpiece of an agricultural community called Manatee River Park Estates.

== History ==
Tampa-based developers E.F. Hall and Lee B. James announced their purchase of 14,000 acres in northeastern Manatee County in November 1925. Around that time, the developers held a picnic and barbecue event open to the public to encourage prospective buyers and to allow them to view the area. It was reported afterwards that approximately 2,000 people attended the event. The subdivision was first platted on March 23, 1926, and consisted of 65 blocks containing 24–38 home sites on each block. The five- and ten-acre lots were intended as a ranchette, or a small farm. Advertisements of the time trumpeted that the land was already plowed and was ready for the raising of poultry, various vegetables and citrus. Later, a second plat enlarged the site to 158 blocks. A large plot of land was set aside for a school and another tract was turned into Howe Park. Connecting avenues were named for various U.S. presidents. Huyler Boulevard was made the main thoroughfare in the nascent town and was maintained as such as construction continued. A 2-story hotel was also constructed to house prospective buyers on the east side of the Parrish-Bethany grade, now known as County Road 675. A post office existed from October 1926 to September 1934, when the office merged with that of Myakka City.

=== Hurricanes and The Depression ===
All of this activity ended with the combination of the hurricanes of 1926 and 1928 which devastated south Florida, causing investors to withdraw from the state. Manhattan and many other real estate ventures around the state suffered from this downturn. The land of Manhattan reverted to the state of Florida for back taxes. The Murphy Act was soon passed by the state legislature, allowing anyone to pay back taxes on a property in debt and in return would receive a deed for that land from the state. Despite its foreclosure, the failed development was still listed in a 1943 plat book of Manatee County, and shows the location to be in the middle of Manatee River Farms, north of the Manatee River and Gilley Creek, at Range 20 East and Township 34 South. Parrish-Manhattan Road runs to the west of the area, and the road is now known as County Road 675. The area insects this road and State Road 64, near the present-day Edward Chance Preserve.

=== Rutland Ranch to the present ===
In 1944, Hubert Rutland, a St. Petersburg, Florida–based businessman, began the process of buying up tax and deeds and unpaid drainage bonds on property along County Road 675 that included the former Manhattan subdivision. This land and other nearby tracts of land were secured and incorporated into Rutland's eventual 30,000 acre ranch. After being transformed into a headquarters of the ranch, the Manhattan hotel appears to have burned down in the intervening years, and any other original structures have similarly ceased to exist. As of 2019, this area is under development for Highland Homes' Aviary, a new housing community.
