= Arlington, Citrus County, Florida =

Former farming community in Inverness, Florida

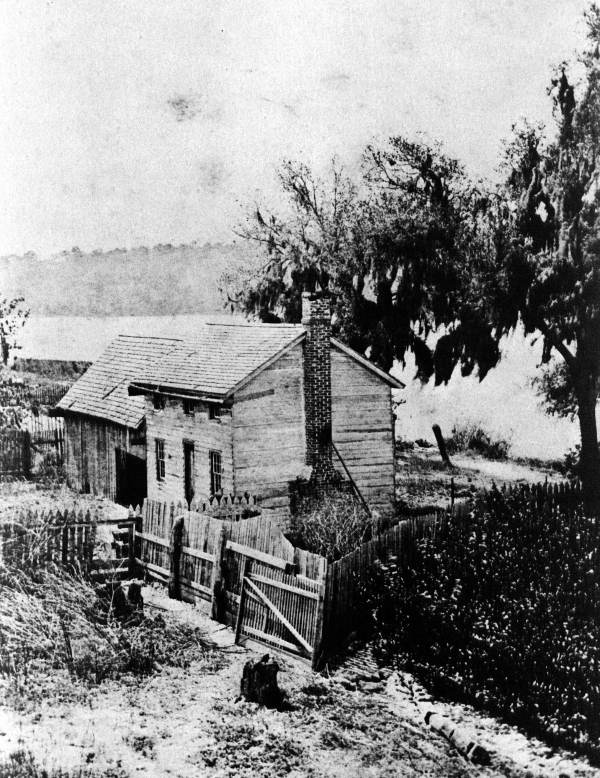
Home next to the river in Arlington, Florida, 1880s

Arlington is a former community near Inverness, Citrus County, Florida, United States.

== Overview ==
Arlington was a farming community. It was originally known as Proveville because the settlers here had to live on land for a certain amount of time before it was their possession. The town in its heyday had about 50 residents in 1881, a school, a church and a sawmill. Residents here were mostly farmers and grew pineapples, oranges, and bananas.

== See also ==
- List of ghost towns in Florida
