= Bermont, Florida =

Bermont, Florida is a ghost town in Charlotte County, Florida, United States. The community is located at 26°56′44″N 81°45′38″W.

Bermont was a sawmill town founded around the state's land boom in the 1920s. The town was also known for its sugarcane, which is made into sugar and juice. In 1908, it received a post office. It soon grew to have a general store and a school used as a church on weekends. It also had a weekly newspaper, debating society, horticulture club and a literacy club. The town had its own baseball team called Bermont Baseball Team that would often play the nearby town of Sparkman.

== See also ==
- List of ghost towns in Florida
- Bermont Formation
