= Earleton, Florida =

- Unincorporated community
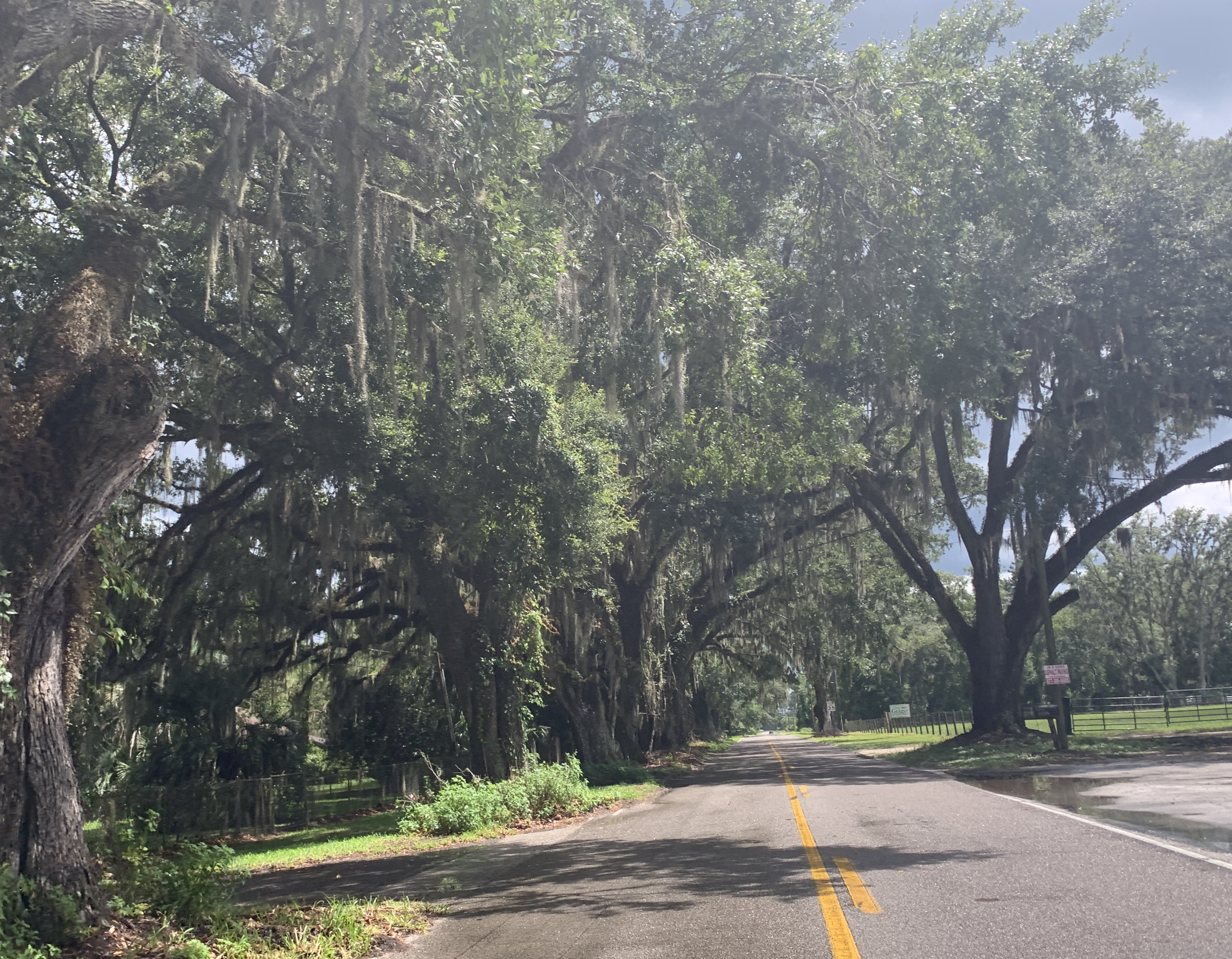

- Location within Florida
- Coordinates: 29°44′38″N 82°06′12″W
- Country: United States
- State: Florida
- County: Alachua
- Elevation: 180 ft (55 m)
- Time zone: UTC-5 (Eastern (EST))
  - Summer (DST): UTC-4 (EDT)
- ZIP code: 32631
- Area code: 352
- GNIS feature ID: 294372

Earleton, Florida historical marker
(front and back)
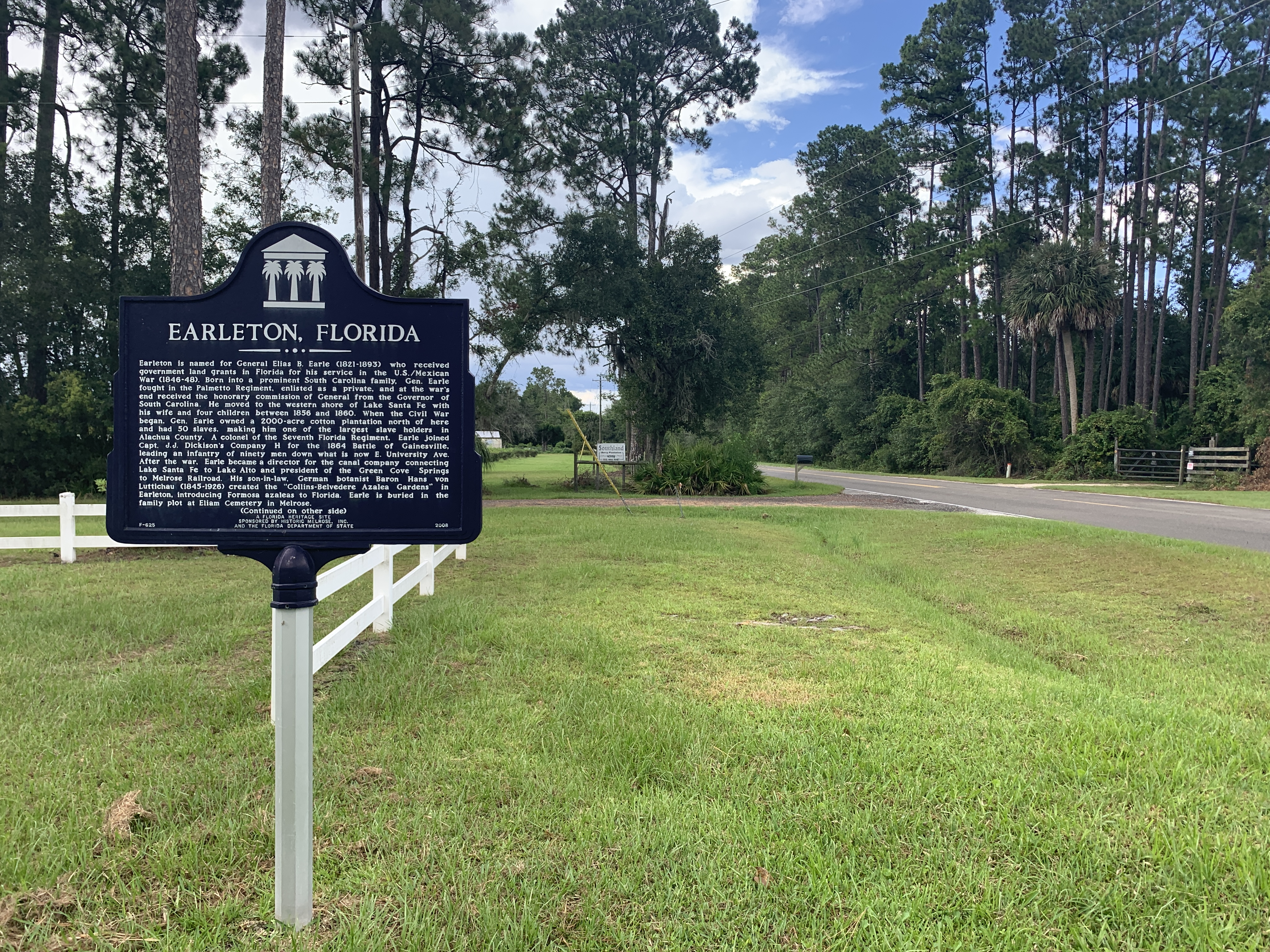
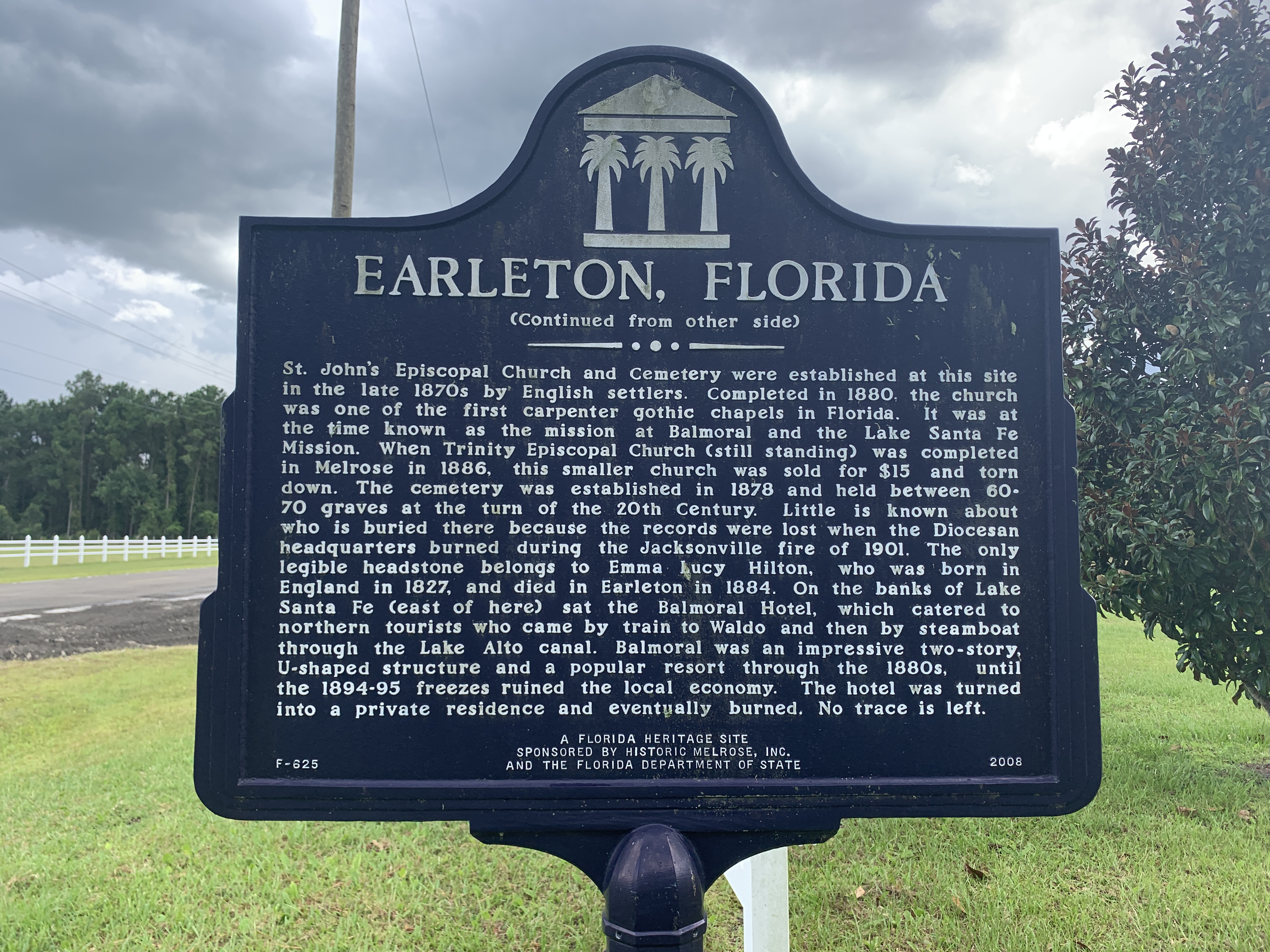

Earleton is an unincorporated community in Alachua County, Florida, United States. The community is located on County Road 1469, 5 miles (8.0 km) southeast of Waldo, on the west shore of Lake Santa Fe. In 1888, the community had a hotel, general store, school and church. Vegetables were shipped from the area to the northern states, and wine was produced from locally grown grapes. A post office named "Rosetta" was established in 1886. The name was changed to "Earleton" in 1887. The ZIP code is 32631.
