= Cromanton, Florida =

Unincorporated community in Florida, U.S.

Coordinates: 30°06′59″N 85°38′06″W

Cromanton is an unincorporated community (by some accounts a ghost town) in Bay County, in the U.S. state of Florida.

== History ==
Cromanton was platted in 1888. A post office was established at Cromanton in 1888, and remained in operation until 1941. Cromanton was overtaken by Tyndall Air Force Base and little remains of the original community.
