= Pine Level, Santa Rosa County, Florida =

Pine Level, Florida
- Census-designated place
- Location within Florida Location within the United States
- Coordinates: 30°52′41″N 87°09′48″W
- Country: United States
- State: Florida
- County: Santa Rosa

Area
  - Total: 6.79 sq mi (17.6 km^{2})
  - Land: 6.72 sq mi (17.4 km^{2})
  - Water: 0.07 sq mi (0.18 km^{2})
- Elevation: 246 ft (75 m)

Population (2020)
  - Total: 253
  - Density: 37.6/sq mi (14.5/km^{2})
- Time zone: UTC-6 (Central (CST))
  - Summer (DST): UTC-5 (CDT)
- Area code: 850
- GNIS feature ID: 2583374

Pine Level is an unincorporated community and census-designated place in Santa Rosa County, Florida, United States. Its population was 253 at the 2020 census, up from 227 at the 2010 census. It is part of the Pensacola—Ferry Pass—Brent, Florida Metropolitan Statistical Area. It is located about 5 miles (8.0 km) south of Jay.

== Demographics ==
Pine Level first appeared as a census designated place in the 2010 U.S. census.
