= Fort Drum, Florida =

Former community in Florida, US

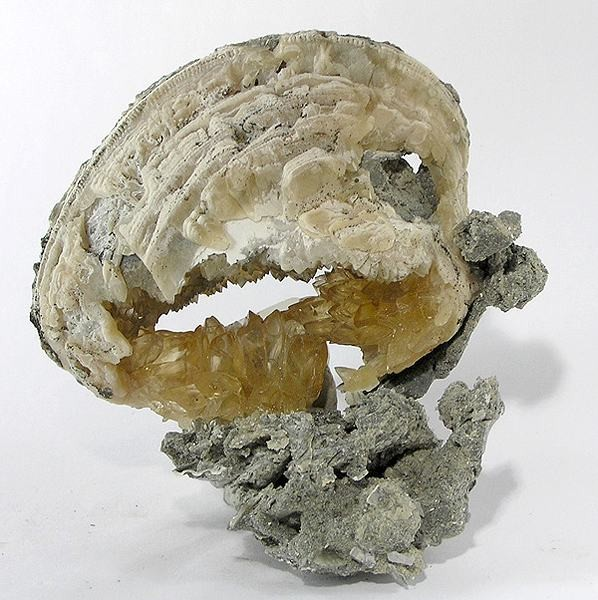
Calcite crystals in fossilized clamshell, only known location to be found is in Fort Drum.

Fort Drum was a town in Okeechobee County, Florida, United States. It is located on US 441, between Yeehaw Junction and Okeechobee. A service plaza on Florida's Turnpike is named after the town.

The Fort Drum Wildlife Management Area consists of nearly 21,000 acres in southwestern Indian River County and is named for its proximity to the town and is known as the birthplace of the St. John's River. Fort Drum is the only known locale for crystal bearing fossil shells.

There is a cemetery in the middle of the town on almost eight acres, in which many of the first settlers of Fort Drum were buried. It is currently owned and maintained by Okeechobee County.

== Geography ==
Fort Drum is located at 27°31′35″N 80°48′25″W.

In the Pliocene and Pleistocene it was underlain by the now-smaller Lake Okeechobee. Vast limestone deposits containing the remains of large bivalve molluscs developed calcite crystallization while still under water. The gemlike crystals were discovered after the hard limestone deposits came to be excavated for aggregate. In 2008 the quarry known as Ruck's Pit was closed and allowed to flood.

== History ==
After the end of the Second Seminole War in 1842, the US Army built a network of forts across the central part of the state, with military roads that connected them. Of those roads, one was roughly east–west from Fort Bassinger to Fort Vinton, north of present-day Vero Beach. The other ran approximately north–south from Fort Kissimmee to Fort Jupiter, and came to be known as the 'old wire road'.

Where the two roads crossed, Fort Drum was built. The US Army used it only for a short time and then abandoned it. Settlers began to make their way here in the 1870s, some time after the Civil War. The area was considered to be potentially excellent cattle country. The area slowly grew.

With the completion in 1914 of the Kissimmee Valley Extension, the Florida East Coast Railroad brought changes to the area. They built a small depot in Fort Drum, as well as one to the north, named Osawaw, and south, called Hilolo.
