= Great Freeze =

1894–95 record cold waves in southern US

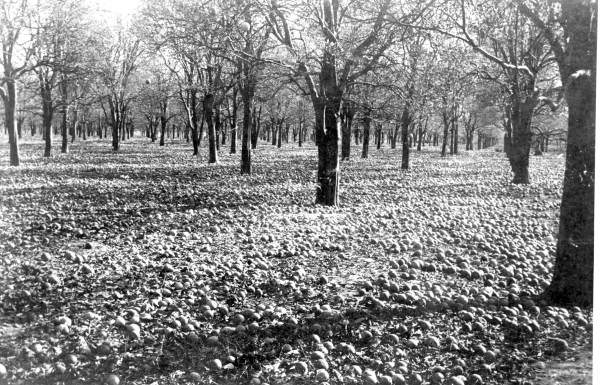
Damage to an orange grove in Bartow, Florida

The Great Freeze was a period of back-to-back freezes during the winter of 1894–95 in the Southern United States, particularly notable for destroying much of the citrus crop in Northern Florida.

Entire communities, such as Earnestville, faded after the citrus crops and trees were lost to the two unusually cold-weather patterns of the winter season.

== Weather records ==
Orlando reached an all-time record low of 18 °F (−8 °C) on December 28, 1894, which still stands, as does West Palm Beach at 24 °F (−4 °C) on the same date.

In the second cold wave (1895), West Palm Beach recorded an all time February record low of 27 °F (−3 °C) on February 9, 1895. On the same date, Orlando fell to 19 °F (−7 °C), an all time February record low that remains unbeaten to this day.

A snowstorm produced unprecedented snowfall amounts along the Gulf Coast, including 20 inches (51 cm) in Houston, Texas.

Snow fell as far south as Tampico, Mexico, within the Tropic of Cancer, the lowest latitude in North America that snow has been recorded at sea level.

== Events ==
Two freezes occurred in northern Florida during this catastrophic season, the first in December 1894 and the second in February 1895. The first did not actually kill many mature trees, but did set the stage for new growth during the warm month that followed. So, when the second, harder freeze came a few months later, the effects were even more devastating. All varieties of fruit (oranges, grapefruits, lemons, and limes) froze on the trees, and bark split from top to bottom. These effects were felt as far south as the Manatee River, south of Tampa.

By 1895, Florida's abundant citrus groves had extended into North Florida, and the state was producing as much as six million boxes of fruit per year. After the Great Freeze, however, production plummeted to just 100,000 boxes and did not break the one-million-box mark again until 1901. As a result, land values also dropped in the citrus-growing areas from $1,000 (equivalent to $39,000 in 2025) per acre to as little as $10 (equivalent to $390 in 2025) per acre. Many compared the economic impact of the Great Freeze on Florida to the effects of the Great Fire on the city of Chicago.

In the wake of the Great Freeze, some growers simply abandoned their Florida groves to return to the North. A few went to search for frost-free locations in the Caribbean such as Cuba, Puerto Rico, and Jamaica. Others relocated to California, using a seedless variety of grapefruit discovered by C. M. Marsh near Lakeland. He was able to harvest 10,000 buds before the Great Freeze that were later propagated by West Coast growers with great success, although the overall cooler and drier climatic conditions in California produced smaller and less flavorful citrus.

The freeze of 1894 however, prompted Julia Tuttle, founder of Miami, to persuade railroad magnate Henry Flagler to expand his rail line, the Florida East Coast Railway, southward to tropical south Florida. Flagler initially declined. Tuttle wrote to him, asking him to visit the area and to see the frost free climate for himself. Flagler sent James E. Ingraham to investigate, and he returned with a favorable report and a box of orange blossoms to show that the area had escaped the frost. Flagler followed up with his own visit and concluded at the end of his first day that the area was ripe for expansion. He made the decision to extend his railroad to Miami and build a resort hotel. This allowed the Florida citrus industry to flourish in central and south Florida in a warmer climate than north Florida.

By the 1940s Florida's citrus industry had rebounded greatly in the warmer central and southern portions of the state. Today, Florida is now the second in the world only to Brazil in the production of oranges.

== See also ==
- Agriculture in Florida
- Winter of 1894–95 in the United Kingdom
- Great Frost of 1709
- List of ghost towns in Florida
