= Pine Level, DeSoto County, Florida =

Coordinates: 27°16′N 82°0′W

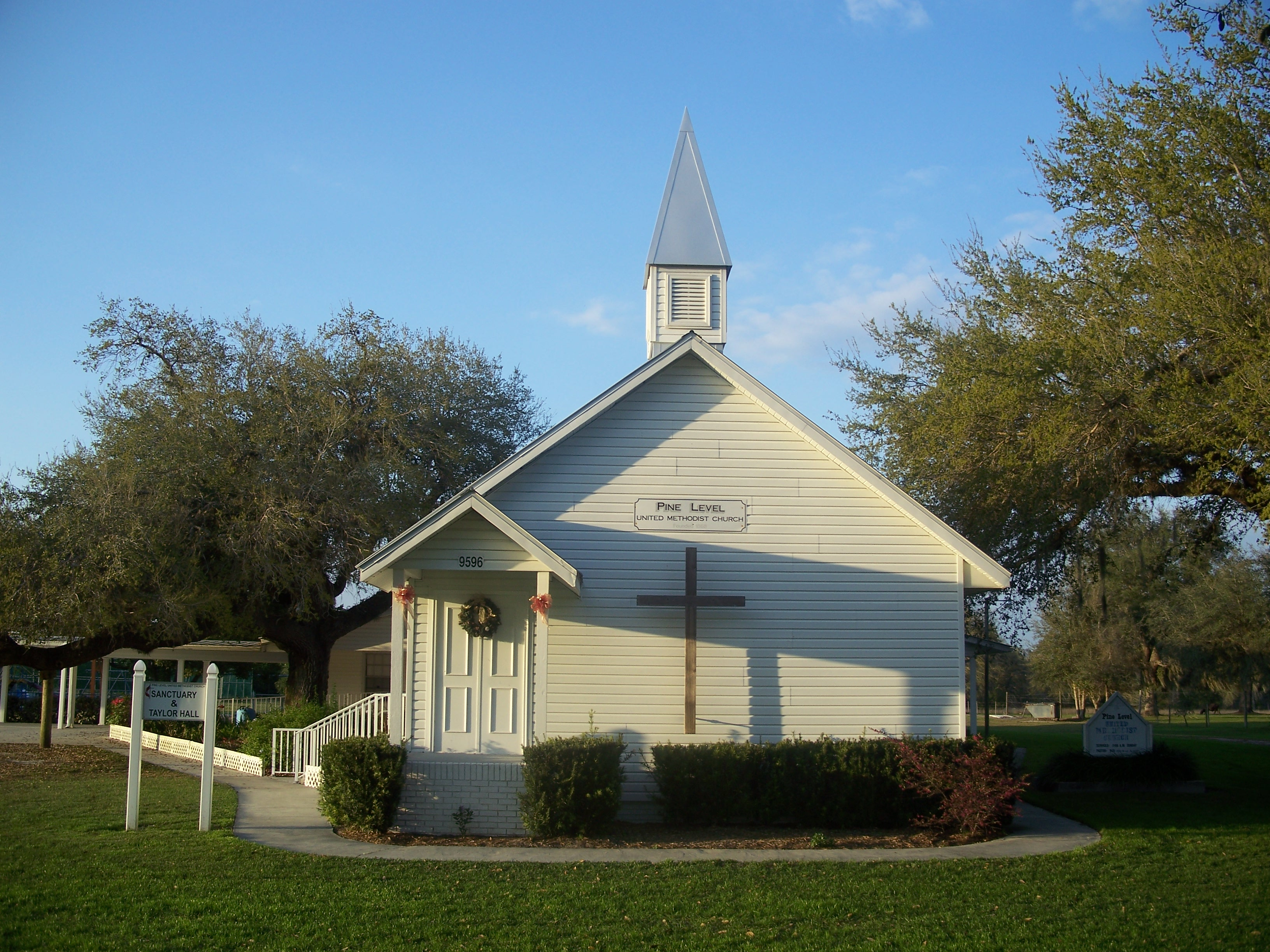
Pine Level Methodist Church

Pine Level is a ghost town in DeSoto County, Florida, United States.

In 1866, the site of what became Pine Level was chosen as the new county seat of Manatee County to replace the village of Manatee (now the eastern section of Bradenton). Ostensibly Pine Level was chosen for its more central geographic location, but it may have been chosen to punish Manatee for its Confederate sympathies in the Civil War.

In 1887, Pine Level was included in the newly created DeSoto County carved out of Manatee County and it temporarily served as the county seat of the new county while the seat of Manatee County was returned to Manatee. However, in 1888 the county seat of DeSoto County was moved from Pine Level to Arcadia.

The East and West Coast Railway began construction of a route from Bradenton east to Arcadia in July 1913. The nearly 50 mile long line was completed and opened for operation on May 3, 1915. Pine Level was located on this line, 41 miles from its starting point in Bradenton. Pine Level had a depot, a 1,348' railroad siding and a 524' spur track. The railroad served a large saw mill at Pine Level. In July 1933, the Interstate Commerce Commission authorized the East & West Coast Railway to abandon the tracks from Bradenton to Arcadia. Most of the abandonment actually then took place in September 1934.

Compiled in the late 1930s and first published in 1939, the Florida guide listed Pine Level's population as 30 and described the folklore associated with nearby Horse Creek:

Before 1880 this and neighboring streams were favorite haunts of 'Alligator' Platt, renowned hunter, whose exploits are preserved in the lore of south Florida. He would hide along a bank until a 'gator floated to the surface, and then dive in and tackle the creature, it is said. Man and beast would vanish in a tremendous swirl of muddy water. Platt would shortly reappear, astride his victim, and ride it triumphantly ashore, his thumbs hooked in the 'gator's eyes. It was easy to capture the biggest saurian that way, with no expense for gunpowder and shell, said Platt, recommending the method to his contemporaries.

— Federal Writers'Project, "Part III: The Florida Loop", Florida: A Guide to the Southernmost State (1947)

Today, all that remains of Pine Level is the Pine Level Methodist Church, the Indian Mound Cemetery, and the Pine Level Campground Cemetery. The site is marked by a State of Florida bronze marker.

== See also ==
- List of ghost towns in Florida
