= List of county roads in Hardee County, Florida =

- County road shields used in Florida

Highway names
- Interstates: Interstate X (I-X)
- US Highways: U.S. Highway X (US X)
- State: State Road X (SR X)
- County: County Road X (CR X)

System links
- County roads in Florida; County roads in Hardee County

The following is a list of county roads in Hardee County, Florida. All county roads are maintained by the county in which they reside.

== County roads in Hardee County ==
Route	Road Name(s)	From	To	Notes
CR 35A	Florida Avenue	SR 64 west of Zolfo Springs	US 17 (SR 35) in Coker	Former SR 35A
CR 35B	Terrell Road, Louisiana Street Metheny Road	CR 64A / Altman Road in Wauchula Polk Road northwest of Wauchula	CR 35A / Louisiana Street in Wauchula CR 35A north of Wauchula	Former SR 35B
CR 64A	West Main Street	SR 64 / Hightower Lane in Oak Grove	US 17 (SR 35) / SR 636 in Wauchula	Former SR 64A
CR 634	Sweetwater Road	US 17 (SR 35) west-northwest of Sweetwater	Sweetwater Road / Crewsville Road in Sweetwater	Former SR 634
CR 636	Steve Roberts Special E. Road	SR 64 east-northeast of Zolfo Springs	CR 671 / Parnell Road north-northwest of Crewsville	Former SR 636; unrelated to current SR 636, which was SR 64A.
CR 652	Griffin Road	SR 636 in Wauchula	Griffin Road at a bridge over the Peace River in Wauchula	Former SR 652
CR 661	Lawrence Street; Murphy Road; Everett Whidden Road	CR 661 / NW Kinsey County Line Road at the DeSoto County line south-southeast of Limestone	SR 64 in Oak Grove	Former SR 661
CR 663		CR 661 in Limestone	Fort Green Road at the Polk County line north-northwest of Fort Green	Former SR 663; FDOT's Hardee County map does not indicate that the portion between SR 64 in Ona and SR 62 in Fort Green Springs to be part of CR 663, but it is signed as part of it.
CR 663A	Experiment Station Road; Goose Pond Road	IFAS Agricultural and Research Center southwest of Bridges	CR 663 / Bridges Road in Bridges	Former SR 663A
CR 664	Main Street; Lake Branch Road County Line Road	CR 663 in Fort Green US 17 (SR 35) north of Bowling Green	CR 664A in Bowling Green County Line Road at a bridge over an unnamed stream on the Polk County line east-northeast of Bowling Green	Former SR 664
CR 664A	Oak Street; Heard Bridge Road; Lake Branch Road; Hardee Street	US 17 (SR 35) / Oak Street in Wauchula	US 17 (SR 35) / CR 668 in Bowling Green	Former SR 664A
CR 664B	Boyd Cowart Road; Heard Bridge Road	SR 636 / Manley Road east of Wauchula CR 664A / Troy Smith Road east-southeast of Bowling Green	CR 664A northeast of Coker CR 664 at the Polk County line east-northeast of Bowling Green	Former SR 664B
CR 665	Fish Branch Road	US 17 (SR 35) in Gardner CR 663 in Limestone	Fish Branch Road at a bridge over Fish Branch east of Gardner SR 64 west of Ona	Former SR 665
CR 667	Maude Road	SR 64 / Rest Haven Road in Lemon Grove	Maude Road north-northeast of Hart Cemetery north-northeast of Lemon Grove	Former SR 667
CR 668	Doc Coil Road; Hardee Street	CR 664 west-southwest of Bowling Green	US 17 (SR 35) / CR 664A in Bowling Green	former SR 668
CR 671	Parnell Road	CR 636 / Parnell Road north-northwest of Crewsville	SR 64 / Old Town Creek Road	Former SR 671
CR 684	Moffitt Road	US 17 (SR 35) in Moffit	Moffitt Road / Sasser Road east-northeast of Moffit	Former SR 684
