= Florida State Road 64 =

State highway in Florida, United States

State Road 64
- SR 64 highlighted in red

Route information
- Maintained by FDOT
- Length: 77.386 mi (124.541 km)
- Tourist routes: Palma Sola; Florida Cracker Trail

Major junctions
- West end: City Road 789 in Holmes Beach
- US 41 / US 301 in Bradenton; I-75 near Bradenton; US 17 in Zolfo Springs
- East end: US 27 / US 98 / SR 17 in Avon Park

Location
- Country: United States
- State: Florida
- Counties: Manatee, Hardee, Highlands

Highway system
- Florida State Highway System; Interstate; US; State; Former; Pre‑1945; Toll; Scenic
← SR 63	→ SR 65

State Road 64 (SR 64) extends from City Road 789 (former County Road 789) near the Gulf of Mexico in Holmes Beach on Anna Maria Island in Manatee County to US 27/US 98 in Avon Park in Highlands County. State Road 64 travels from west to east through the counties of Manatee, Hardee and Highlands.

== Route description ==
=== Manatee County ===
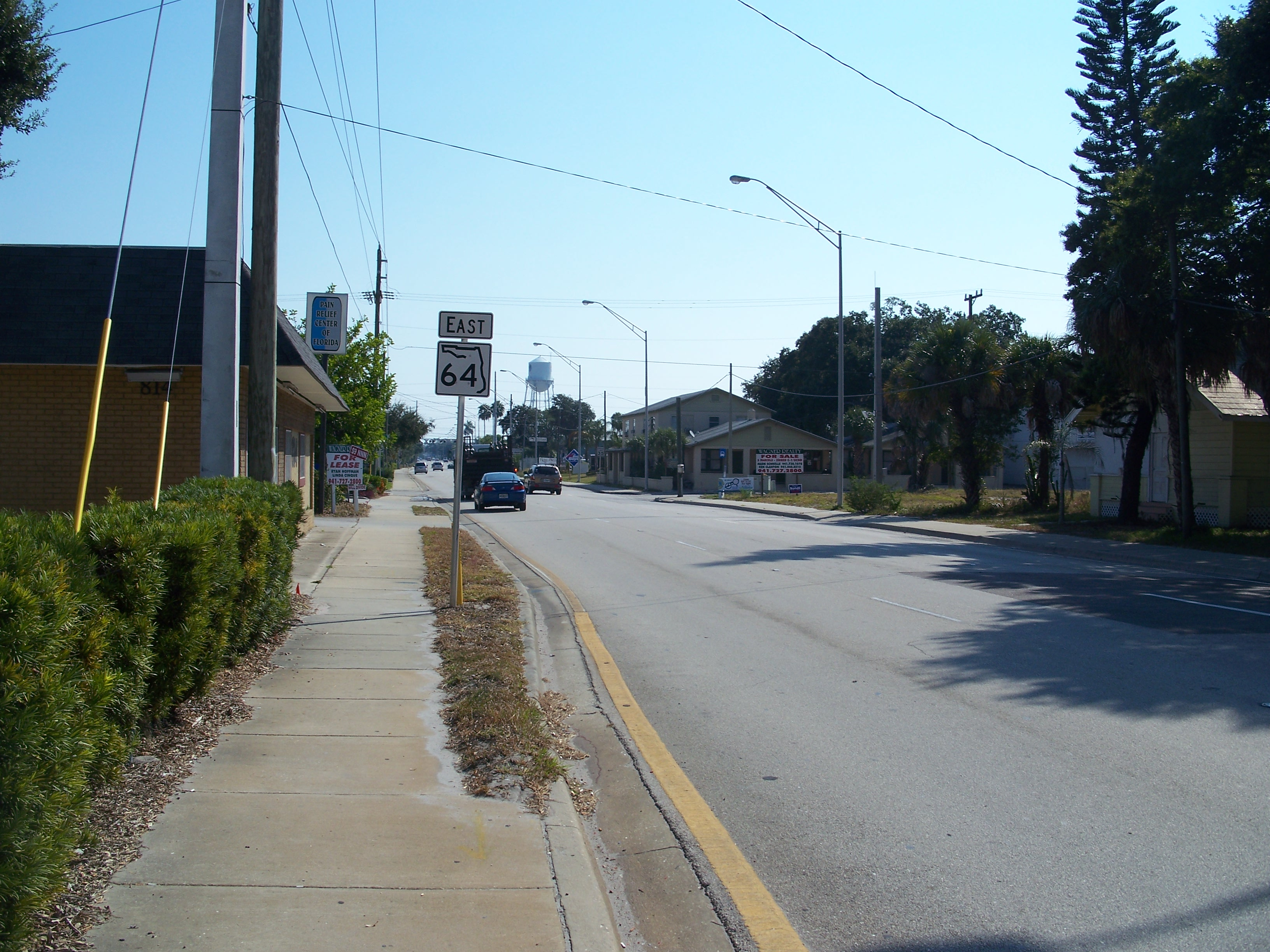
SR 64 eastbound in Bradenton

SR 64 begins at Gulf Drive (City Road 789) in Holmes Beach on Anna Maria Island and heads east along Manatee Avenue. Less than a mile after it begins, it crosses Anna Maria Sound via the Anna Maria Island Bridge on to Perico Island, which is within Bradenton city limits. About two miles later, it crosses the Palma Sola Causeway on to the mainland, where it becomes a four-land divided road. At 15th Avenue near Downtown Bradenton, SR 64 splits into two one-way street pairs with eastbound lanes shifting south one block on to 6th Avenue while westbound lanes remain on Manatee Avenue through Downtown Bradenton. Through Downtown Bradenton, SR 64 intersects US 41 Business (Tamiami Trail), crosses CSX's Palmetto Subdivision, and intersects US 41.

The eastbound and westbound lanes rejoin each other on Manatee Avenue just east of Downtown Bradenton at 14th Street near the Manatee Village Historical Park. SR 64 continues east from here as a six-lane divided road. It crosses the Braden River and exits Bradenton city limits before coming to an interchange with Interstate 75 (I-75). Continuing east of I-75, SR 64 reduces to four lanes at Lakewood Ranch Road. At Lorraine Road, it becomes a two-lane road as it becomes a more rural route. It passes Lake Manatee State Park and crosses Lake Manatee near Bethany. It then passes to the north of Wingate Creek State Park and through Myakka Head before entering Hardee County.

=== Hardee and Highlands counties ===
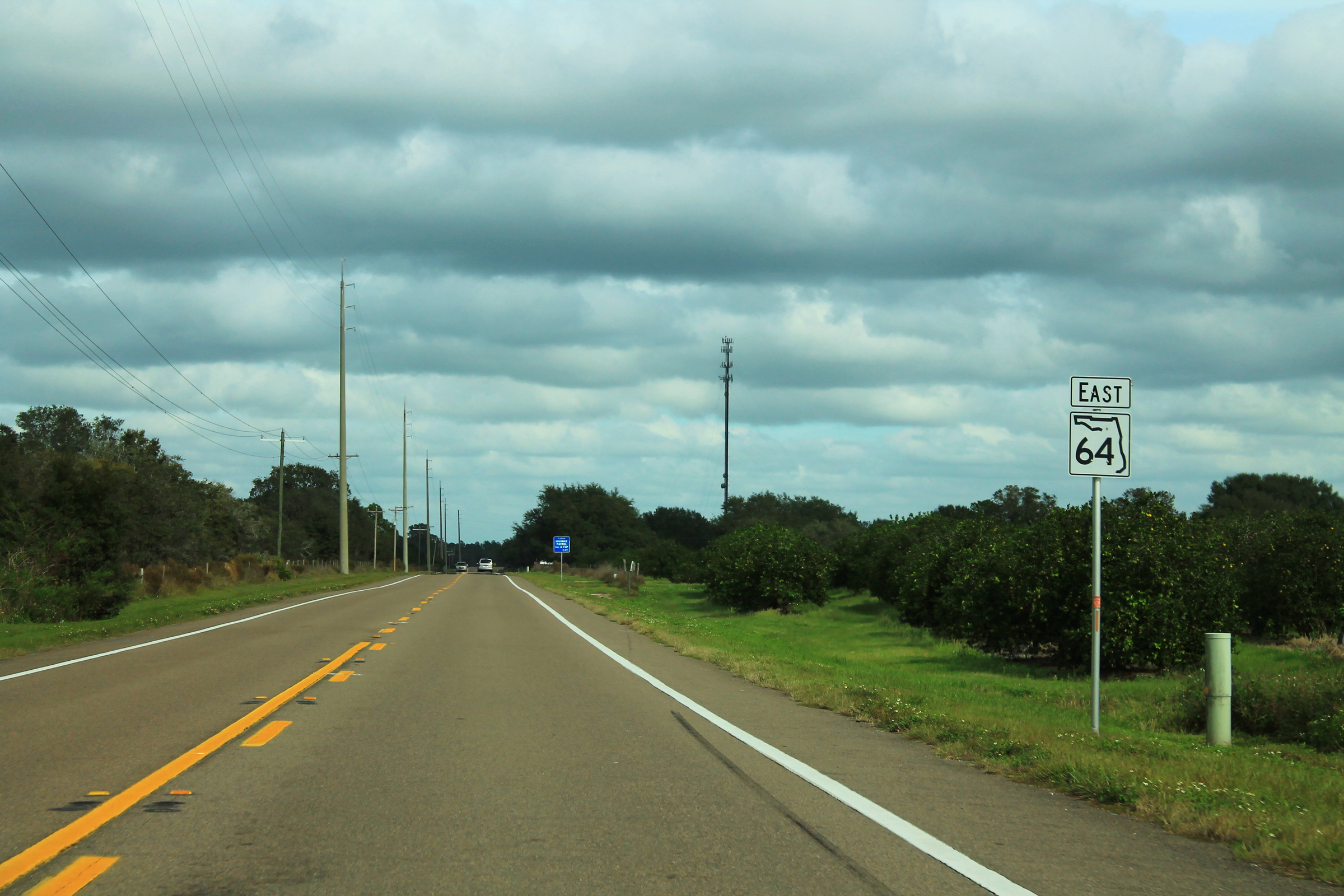
Eastbound on Florida State Road 64 just east of the Hardee County line.

In Hardee County, SR 64 continues east and after nine miles, it passes the community of Ona. In Ona, it crosses CSX's Brewster Subdivision and intersects CR 663, which runs north to Fort Green and south to Limestone and Arcadia. Continuing east of Ona, it crosses the Peace River and enters Zolfo Springs. SR 64 intersects US 17 in Zolfo Springs. East of Zolfo Springs, SR 64 turns northeast and intersects with SR 636 seven miles later. It then continues east and enters Highlands County.

In Highlands County, SR 64 enters Avon Park city limits near Avon Park Executive Airport. SR 64 then comes to its eastern terminus at US 27/US 98 in Avon Park.

== History ==
SR 64 from just east of Bradenton to Zolfo Springs was once the western segment of a cattle trail running from Bradenton to Fort Pierce, now known as the Florida Cracker Trail. The road was added to the state highway system in the 1920s with various designations. The route was originally SR 18 from Palma Sola Bay to Bradenton, SR 63 from US 41 in Bradenton to a point east of Zolfo Springs (at present-day SR 636), and SR 32 east of there to Avon Park. It was also SR 161 concurrently from Bradenton to Waterbury Road (CR 675).

The route was redesignated SR 64 in 1945 as a result of the 1945 Florida State Road renumbering.

In 1957, SR 64 was extended west from Bradenton west to Perico Island and Anna Maria Island over the newly-built Palma Sola Causeway and Anna Maria Island Bridge. Perico Island was previously access via a road that ran from 9th Avenue North southwest along the present-day Spoonbill Trail.

== Bridges ==
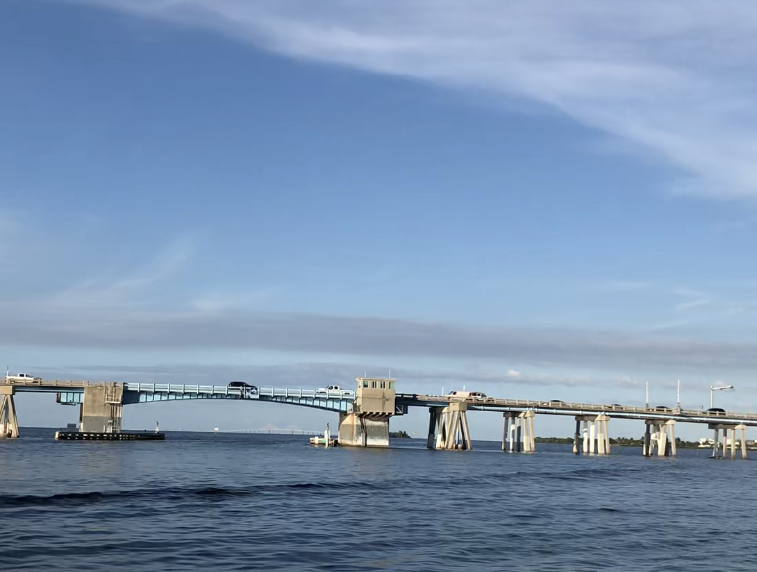
Anna Maria Island Bridge

=== Anna Maria Island Bridge ===
The Anna Maria Island Bridge is a double-leaf bascule bridge that crosses the Sarasota Bay, connecting the barrier islands of Holmes Beach to the mainland of Palma Sola, Florida. It was built in 1957 along with the Palma Sola Causeway. The bridge extended SR 64 to Anna Maria Island. The Anna Maria Island Bridge was the second bridge connecting the mainland to Anna Maria Island after the Cortez Bridge.

The bridge was designated by the 1965 Legislature of Florida.

== Major intersections ==
County	Location	mi	km	Destinations	Notes
Manatee	Holmes Beach	0.000	0.000	City Road 789 (Gulf Drive) – Manatee Beach, Anna Maria	Western terminus
Manatee	Holmes Beach	0.216	0.348	SR 789 south (East Bay Drive) – Bradenton Beach, Longboat Key, Sarasota	
Manatee	Sarasota Bay (Gulf Intracoastal Waterway)	0.99	1.59	Anna Maria Island Bridge	
Manatee	Bradenton	8.660	13.937	US 41 Bus. (9th Street West / SR 45) – Sarasota, Palmetto	
Manatee	Bradenton	9.166	14.751	US 41 (1st Street / SR 55) / US 301 – Palmetto, Oneco, Sarasota	
Manatee	Bradenton	10.133	16.307	SR 70 south (15th Street East)	
Manatee		14.938	24.040	I-75 (SR 93) – Tampa, St. Petersburg, Naples, Miami	Exit 220 on I-75
Manatee		25.338	40.778	CR 675 south – Arcadia	West end of CR 675 overlap
Manatee		25.836	41.579	CR 675 north – Parrish	East end of CR 675 overlap
Hardee		43.336	69.743	CR 665 south – Solomon's Castle	
Hardee	Ona	50.237	80.849	CR 663	
Hardee		52.931	85.184	Murphy Road (CR 661 south)	
Hardee	Oak Grove	53.183	85.590	West Main Street (CR 64A east) - Wauchula	
Hardee		57.103	91.898	South Florida Avenue (CR 35A north)	
Hardee	Peace River			Bridge over the Peace River	
Hardee	Zolfo Springs	58.035	93.398	US 17 (SR 35) – Wauchula, Arcadia	
Hardee		58.914	94.813	Steve Roberts Special (CR 636 east)	
Hardee	Griffins Corner	63.231	101.760	Griffin Road (CR 652 west)	
Hardee		65.341	105.156	SR 636 west – Wauchula	
Hardee	Lemon Grove	66.671	107.297	Maude Road (CR 667 north)	
Hardee		70.489	113.441	Parnell Road (CR 671 south)	
Highlands	Avon Park	77.386	124.541	US 27 / US 98 (SR 25) / SR 17 south (Main Street) – Lake Wales, Sebring	Eastern terminus; truck route to SR 17 / CR 64
1.000 mi = 1.609 km; 1.000 km = 0.621 mi: Concurrency terminus

== Related roads ==
=== County Road 64 in Manatee County ===
County Road 64
- Location: Bradenton
- Length: 4.5 mi (7.2 km)

County Road 64 (CR 64) is the unsigned designation for 75th Street Northwest on the west side of Bradenton. It runs from SR 684 (Cortez Road) north across SR 64 to the De Soto National Memorial northwest of Palma Sola. The route was previously a spur of SR 64.

=== County Road 64 in Highlands and Polk Counties ===
County Road 64
- Location: Avon Park-Avon Park Air Force Range
- Length: 9.2 mi (14.8 km)

County Road 64 is a bi-county extension of SR 64 in Highlands and Polk Counties. It begins at SR 17 in Avon Park as East Main Street, which is part of SR 17 from the eastern terminus of SR 64. From there it runs straight west and east until the intersection with East Avon Pines Road, where it branches to the northeast, a position it maintains throughout the rest of the county. After crossing a bridge over Bonnet Creek, it crosses the Polk County Line thus entering part of the Lake Wales Ridge State Forest, before curving east as it approaches a bridge over Arbuckle Creek, and terminating at the Avon Park Air Force Range.

=== County Road 64A in Hardee County ===
County Road 64A
- Location: Oak Grove-Wauchula
- Length: 6.7 mi (10.8 km)

County Road 64A is an alternate county route of SR 64. It begins as a north-south road at the intersection with SR 64 in Oak Grove west of Zolfo Springs, and begins to curve to the northeast at the intersection of Alton Carlton Road, which leads to the Wauchula Municipal Airport. By the time it reaches the intersection of CR 35B, it runs directly west and east like its parent route and enters the City of Wauchula. Here, the road's only major intersection is CR 35A before it finally terminates at the intersection of US 17 and SR 636.
