= Pioneer Park (Hardee County, Florida) =

Coordinates: 27.5011°N 81.8°W

Pioneer Park is located in Zolfo Springs, Florida. This park, owned and operated by Hardee County, Florida, is at the northwest corner of US 17 and Florida Highway 64. It is bounded by those two highways and on the north and west by Peace River. Roughly the northern half of the park is wooded.

Pioneer Park has many features. Hurricane Charley caused much damage to the park on August 13, 2004, and not all the damaged structures were repaired. On the west is Pioneer Park Lake, a manmade 8.5 acre body of water. On the lake and along Peace River fishing is allowed. Also, people canoe on Peace River. Areas in the park are set aside for campers.

== Cracker Trail Museum ==
Two unique features of the park are the Cracker Trail Museum and Pioneer Village. The museum was opened June 24, 1967, as Pioneer Park Museum. The Peace River Valley Historical Society opened it. Over the years local residents donated articles for display in the museum. In June 1988 the Historical Society disbanded and the museum closed. Hardee County reopened the museum in September 1988 and was renamed the Cracker Trail Museum. The next year the museum again closed because of lack of funds. Cargill Fertilizer helped with a $50,000 donation. Half of this donation was used to construct an addition to the museum, as it had been very strapped for space. The expanded museum reopened in 1991.

Hurricane Charlie ripped part of the museum roof off and some of the artifacts were damaged. The museum was repaired by volunteers and the artifacts were also repaired by volunteers.

== Pioneer Village ==
Pioneer Village originated shortly after the museum's start. It began with the erection of a cane grinding shed. Soon a 1914 locomotive was donated to the park and an open shed was built to house it. A blacksmith shop dating from 1897 was next reassembled in the park. In 1979 the 100-year-old Hart Cabin, donated by Wendell M. Smith, was moved into the park. A smokehouse was constructed and two wagons from the 1880s were placed in Pioneer Village. An 1886 post office and outhouse were also placed in the village.

In 1979, the Hart Cabin was donated and relocated to the park by Wendell M. Smith, the great-grandson of W.H. Hart. The cabin was built in 1879 and consists of only one of the remaining rooms of the original structure where W.H. and Mary Jane Hart raised their six children on Maude Road in Hardee County. Many of the pieces of furniture located inside the cabin were built by Mr. Hart.

Hurricane Charlie also caused havoc in Pioneer Village. The outhouse was destroyed and the post office was damaged. Both were repaired by volunteers.
