= Pioneer Park Lake =

- Location within Florida
- Location: Pioneer Park, Hardee County, Florida
- Coordinates: 27.5010°N 81.8080°W
- Type: manmade lake
- Surface area: 80.5 acres (326,000 m^{2})

Pioneer Park Lake is a lake in Zolfo Springs, Florida. It is located in Pioneer Park and goes by at least two names. It is known as either Pioneer Park Lake or Twin Lakes. Twin Lakes is an inaccurate name, as only one permanent lake exists. The other part of the "twin" is only a very small drainage basin to the northwest of the permanent lake. It only has water during periods of heavy rain.

== Area ==
The permanent lake is man-made, is almost rectangular in shape and has a surface area of 80.5 acres (326,000 m^{2}). The North-East corner has a small fishing dock. The lake is completely surrounded by a walking trail, picnic tables and shelter-houses on the west side of the lake. Directly to the south is Florida State Highway 64 and about 500 feet (150 m) to the west is Peace River, which also winds about the same distance to the north of the lake. There is no boating or swimming allowed in this lake, just fishing.
