= Popash, Florida =

Coordinates: 27.5184°N 81.7382°W

- Settlement
- Interactive map of Popash, Florida
- Country: United States
- State: Florida
- County: Hardee
- Founded: 1850s
- Named for: Possibly named after the pop ash tree

Popash, Florida is a small rural settlement in Hardee County, Florida, United States. It is located on State Road 64. Popash was founded in the 1850s, and was well-established by the late 1870s. It was possibly named after the pop ash tree. Railroad construction created a possibility of town growth, but the railroad ended up not being routed through the town. Popash has no official written history, it also has no historical placemarkers. In contemporary times, residents work as farmers, ranch workers and at orange groves around the town.

== History ==
Popash was a town and agricultural community that was founded in the 1850s, and was a well-established community by "the late 1870s". In 1879 a post office and The New Hope Baptist Church were organized and established in the community. The post office existed from 1879 to 1887, at which time it was relocated to Zolfo Springs. The church is one of the oldest ones in Hardee County. The town's cemetery, named The New Hope Cemetery, was founded in the late 1870s and is located across from the church. The town's name is possibly named after the pop ash tree.

The building of the railroad in 1886 raised the possibility that it might come to the town, but instead it was routed through Zolfo Springs. This dashed hopes of the town experiencing growth, and the town remained relatively small and "sleepy".

The town's first school was established circa 1898, at which time Popash was located in DeSoto County. Many of the town's activities and events were based at the school and the church. The school closed in 1948, and after several changes of ownership, was demolished in 2009. In 1951, the school was sold to the Board of County Commissioners for $100.00, after which time it was sold to various people throughout the 1950s. When they sold it, just two weeks after its purchase, the Board of County Commissioners retained a small section of 100 square feet to be used as a voting precinct for the general area "for years". Attempts were made to have the school listed on the U.S. National Register of Historic Places, but the building was deemed as lacking in historical significance by Florida state officials.

A general store was constructed in 1943, and was still in place as of 1987.

Popash has no official written history, and the town lacks historical placemarkers.

== In contemporary times ==
In contemporary times, Popash residents have worked as farmers, ranch workers and at the orange orchards around the town. Up to 1987, many of the residents of Popash were natives of the settlement.
