= Paynes Creek Historic State Park =

State park in Florida, United States

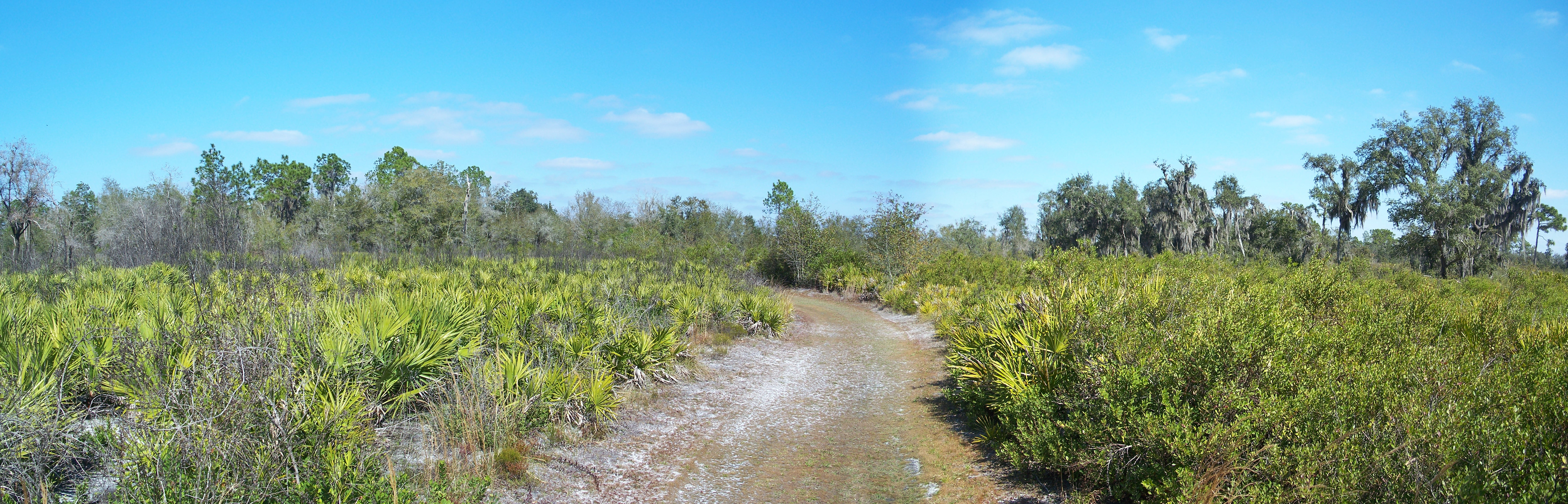

- Location within Florida Location within the United States
- Interactive map of Paynes Creek Historic State Park
- Location: Hardee County, Florida, USA
- Nearest city: Bowling Green, Florida
- Coordinates: 27°37′28″N 81°48′31″W
- Governing body: Florida Department of Environmental Protection
- Payne's Creek Massacre--Fort Chokonikla Site
- U.S. National Register of Historic Places
- Nearest city: Bowling Green, Florida
- Area: 400 acres (161.9 ha)
- Built: 1849
- NRHP reference No.: 78000944
- Added to NRHP: November 21, 1978

Paynes Creek Historic State Park is a Florida State Park located on Lake Branch Road one-half mile southeast of Bowling Green, Florida. On November 21, 1978, it was added to the United States National Register of Historic Places, under the title of Payne's Creek Massacre-Fort Chokonikla Site (also known as "site of Chokonikla blockhouse and bridge" or "Military cemetery").

== History ==
=== Attack after the Second Seminole War ===
Following the First Seminole War the Treaty of Moultrie Creek and the Treaty of Payne's Landing (see also Treaty of Fort Gibson) created reservations for the Seminoles in central and southern Florida, the Second Seminole War ended, the Armed Occupation Act of 1842 was enacted by the federal government that let settlers apply for a 160-acre (0.6 km^{2}) to homestead in Florida. Ignoring the terms of the treaties with the Seminoles, settlers moved southward, encroaching on the reservation.

The remaining Seminole, Mikasuki and Creek leaders in central and south Florida such as Billy Bowlegs (Holata Micco), Abiaka (Sam Jones) and Chipco were leery of their new neighbors. Their ability to trade was limited by the government through the treaties, so as to prevent them from obtaining weapons to cause further conflict. To compensate, white-run trading stores were permitted on the reservation's outskirts to the north and west, letting the Indians obtain supplies and luxuries unavailable within the reservation.

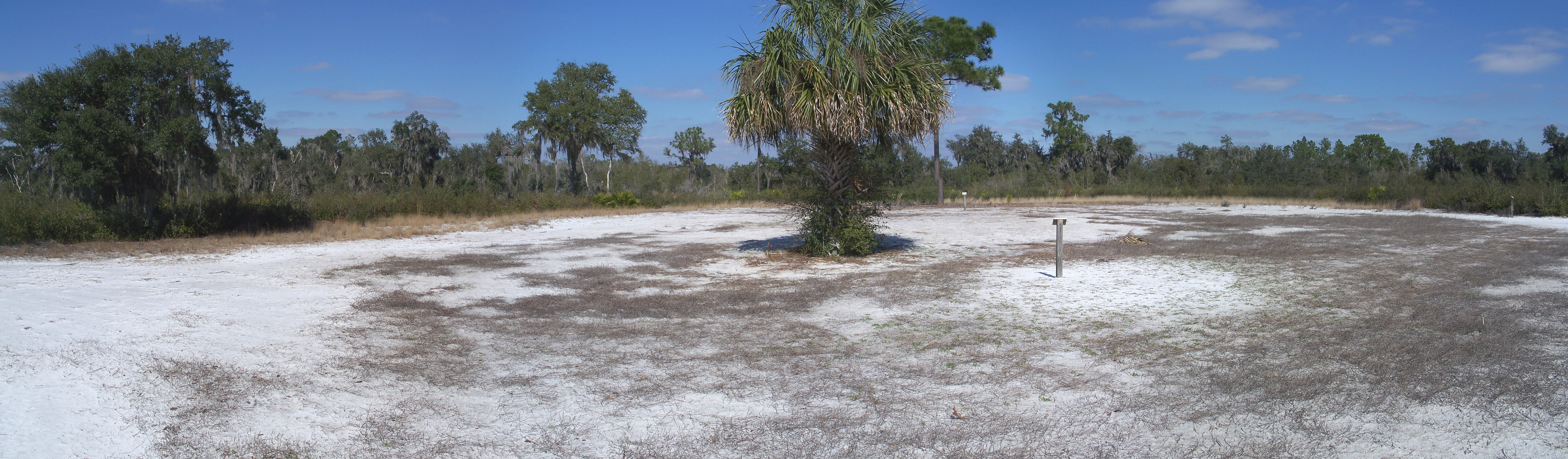
Site of the old fort

Many of the trading posts were built by Kennedy and Darling, two army sutlers from Fort Brooke who had started their own trading company. Their first trading post on Charlotte Harbor north of the Caloosahatchee river was damaged in the September 1848 Hurricane, eventually abandoned (spring 1849); which subsequently burned down and that area is now known as Burnt Store.

Another such store was constructed in the spring of 1849 along the Charlo-popka-hatchee-chee (Little Trout-Eating Creek in Seminole), west of Peas Creek (later known as the Peace River), near present-day Bowling Green. The proprietors were Capt. George Payne and Dempsey Whidden.

A deadly attack occurred on July 12, 1849 at the Indian River settlement near Fort Pierce. On July 17, 1849, Payne and Whidden were killed while William McCullough and Nancy (Whidden) McCullough were wounded by five renegade Seminoles. The store and everything in it was burned.

=== Fort Chokonikla ===
The attack on the trading post in present-day Hardee county caused many of the settlers to flee to the nearest block houses and ask for military forces to be sent so they could return to their homes in safety. This led to the establishment of Fort Chokonikla near the site of the former trading post only three months later, on October 26. The fort's name is believed to derive from the Seminole "Chocka-nickler" meaning "burnt store". It was also variously spelled at the time as "Chokkonickla" or "Chokhonikla".

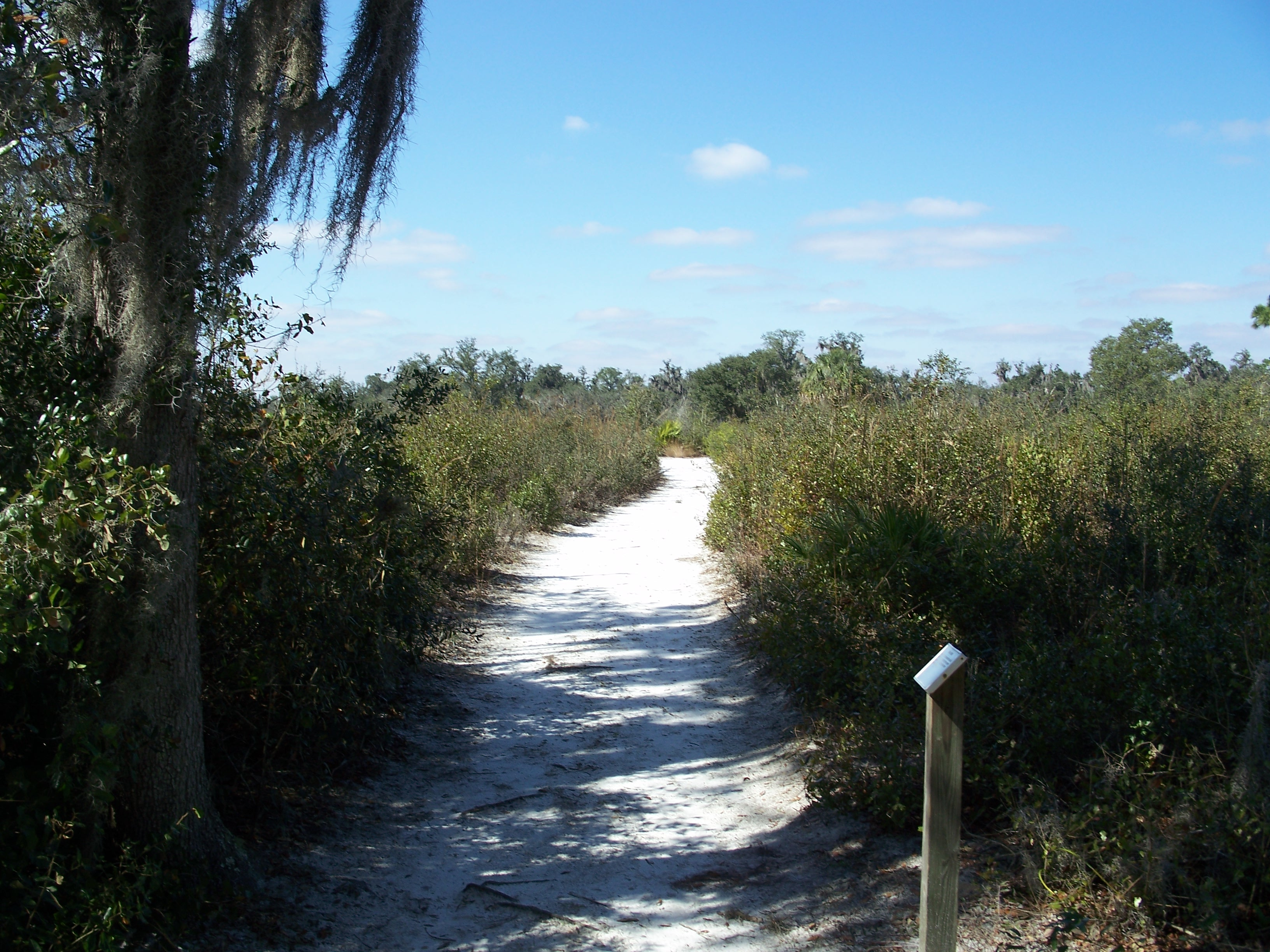
Footpath in park

Following the fort's completion, the nearby creek (Haste Lotka) became known as Payne's Creek, which it is still called to this day. Due to its location near a swamp, a breeding site for mosquitos, many of those stationed at the fort contracted and died of malaria. This became such a problem that the fort's doctor recommended the fort's closure. The army quickly agreed, and the fort was vacated on July 18, 1850, after less than nine months of occupancy, and a year and a day after Payne and Whidden's deaths.

== Recreational activities ==
Canoeing, kayaking, fishing, geocaching, and bird and butterfly watching are available. Amenities include a number of historic sites, three picnic pavilions, and a museum at the visitor center with exhibits on the lives of Seminole people and pioneers in 19th-century Florida.

== Hours ==
Florida state parks are open between 8 am and sundown every day of the year (including holidays).
