= Sweetwater Ranch, Florida =

Unincorporated community in Florida, U.S.

Sweetwater Ranch or Sweetwater is an unincorporated community in the southeast section of Hardee County, Florida, United States. It is located at 27°24′34″N 81°42′09″W with an altitude of 85 feet (26 metres).

Sweetwater is 15 minutes by car southeast of Zolfo Springs, Florida, and is bordered by U.S. 17 to the west, SR 66 to the North, and the unincorporated communities of Crewsville to the east and Fish Branch/Gardner to the South. It contains a significant portion of the Oak Creek watershed and borders on the Charley Creek watershed, both of which empty into Peace River. For many years, Sweetwater was the location of Hardee County's only lake, Lake Frances, which is privately owned. Sweetwater is only 15 minutes from Highlands Hammock State Park, and 20 minutes by car from Highlands County, and the city of Sebring, which offers regional shopping, recreational and medical centers.

While the center of the community was roughly considered the Sweetwater Church of Christ, the congregation was disbanded in the early 1970s and the building demolished. The Church's cemetery remains and was renamed the Mercer Cemetery as a significant number of the population are from that family. The center of the community is now the intersection of Sweetwater (formally County Road 656 and Merle Langford Road) and Crewsville Roads.

== History ==
Sweetwater Ranch once had a thriving rural population whose chief occupation was farming and cattle, and at one point had its own one-room school and was home to a large turpentine mill with a commissary. Most families lived off the land, farming and harvesting domesticated animals such as beef, pork and poultry. The collection of raccoon and alligator hides was a way of life for some, as was (it was rumored) the making of moonshine. The population has steadily declined since the 1950s and the major industry is now citrus and cattle. The population continues to consist mainly of working-class families, with a few retirees.

In early 2007, plans were revealed for a large planned community beginning at Sweetwater Road and US 17 and extending back to Charley Creek to be named Sweetwater Ranch. When fully realized, this development could double the current population of Hardee County.
