= Oak Knoll, Florida =

- Unincorporated community
- Oak Knoll
- Location within Manatee County, Florida
- Coordinates: 27°30′42″N 82°16′39″W
- Country: United States
- State: Florida
- County: Manatee
- Elevation: 75 ft (23 m)
- Time zone: UTC-5 (EST)
  - Summer (DST): UTC-4 (EDT)
- Area code: 941
- FIPS code: 12-50510
- GNIS feature ID: 295496

Oak Knoll is an unincorporated area in Manatee County, Florida, in the United States.

== History ==
Oak Knoll was a small unincorporated community located near and named after the 100-acre Oak Knoll Grapefruit and Orange Company's farm (also known as Huyler's Grove). Located southeast of Parrish and just north of Bethany, Oak Knoll was an agricultural community built around the citrus industry.

In 1914 a residential development was planned for the area by attorney Dan McCord of Des Moines who managed a grove in the area. The development was 16,000 acres along the Manatee River. Although planned subdivision was never built, a community of farmers and winter residents developed. In April 1914, the Oak Knoll Post Office opened. By the fall of 1914, a large hotel was built by the Manatee River Developing Company in the center of the tract. In 1915, the small rural school in the community was replaced by the school board with a new Oak Knoll School. By 1916, over 100 families were residing in the Oak Knoll community, but the community remained very rural. In 1920, the Oak Knoll Post Office was closed and service was moved to the Verna Post Office.

For several decades, Oak Knoll continued to be used to in reference to that area, but by the 1970s, it largely became referred to as part of the larger Parrish area.
