= 1932 United States presidential election in Florida =

- November 8, 1932

Nominee	Franklin D. Roosevelt	Herbert Hoover
Party	Democratic	Republican
Home state	New York	California
Running mate	John Nance Garner	Charles Curtis
Electoral vote	7	0
Popular vote	206,307	69,170
Percentage	74.49%	24.98%
County results
Roosevelt
50–60%
60–70%
70–80%
80–90%
90–100%
President before election
Herbert Hoover
Republican
Elected President
Franklin D. Roosevelt
Democratic

The 1932 United States presidential election in Florida was held on November 8, 1932, as part of the concurrent United States presidential election held in all 48 contemporary states. Florida voters chose seven electors, or representatives to the Electoral College, who voted for president and vice president.

Ever since the disfranchisement of blacks at the beginning of the 1890s, Florida had been a one-party state ruled by the Democratic Party. The disfranchisement of blacks and poor whites by poll taxes in 1889 had left the Republican Party, which had been dependent upon black votes between 1872 and 1888, virtually extinct.

With the single exception of William Howard Taft's win in Calhoun County in 1908 the Democratic Party won every county in Florida in every presidential election from 1892 (Note: In the 1892 presidential election, Republican Benjamin Harrison was not on the ballot and the party backed Populist James B. Weaver.) until 1916. Only twice – and never for more than one term – did any Republican serve in either house of the state legislature between 1896 and 1928. Despite this Democratic dominance and the restrictions on the franchise of the poorer classes due to the poll tax, significant socialist movements were to develop and persist in Tampa and to a lesser extent over other parts of the state, especially against the powerful Ku Klux Klan. There was also a powerful Prohibitionist movements in older North Florida, which saw the Prohibition Party even win the governorship for one term under the notorious anti-Catholic minister Sidney J. Catts.

The 1920 election, aided by a growing "presidential Republican" vote from migrants from the northern states in southern Florida, saw the GOP increase its vote totals above those from traditional Unionists (which Florida entirely lacked) in Texas, Arkansas, Alabama or Georgia. In 1928, Florida, especially the western Panhandle pineywoods, turned dramatically away from the Democratic Party due to the nomination of Catholic Al Smith, with the result that Herbert Hoover became the first Republican to win a statewide election since the end of Reconstruction.

The influence of the Great Depression completely reversed the Republican trend in Florida presidential elections of the 1920s. Absent the religious issue that controlled the 1928 election, Florida resumed typical "Solid South" voting behavior, although the urban Republican trend of the 1920s was not wholly reversed, as seen in Hoover gaining over forty percent of the ballots in the growing urban counties of Orange (Orlando) and Pinellas (St. Petersburg). Franklin D. Roosevelt won against Herbert Hoover by 137,137 votes or by 49.64% and received all 7 of the electoral votes.

== Results ==
Electoral results
Presidential candidate	Party	Home state	Popular vote		Electoral vote	Running mate		
Presidential candidate	Party	Home state	Count	Percentage	Electoral vote	Vice-presidential candidate	Home state	Electoral vote
Franklin D. Roosevelt	Democratic	New York	206,307	74.49%	7	John Nance Garner	Texas	7
Herbert Hoover (incumbent)	Republican	California	69,170	24.98%	0	Charles Curtis (incumbent)	Kansas	0
Norman Thomas	Write-in	New York	775 (Note: These write-in votes were given only as a statewide total, not by county)	0.28%	0	James Maurer	Pennsylvania	0
Various candidates (Note: These votes were listed in America at the Polls state-wide, but not in Dave Leip's Atlas.)	Write-ins	—	692	0.25%	0	—	—	0
Total			276,944	100%	7			7
Needed to win					266			266

=== Results by county ===
County	Franklin Delano Roosevelt Democratic		Herbert Clark Hoover Republican		Margin		Total votes cast
County	#	%	#	%	#	%	Total votes cast
Alachua	3,506	78.10%	983	21.90%	2,523	56.20%	4,489
Baker	1,278	93.63%	87	6.37%	1,191	87.25%	1,365
Bay	2,692	86.25%	429	13.75%	2,263	72.51%	3,121
Bradford	1,317	86.25%	210	13.75%	1,107	72.50%	1,527
Brevard	1,852	65.95%	956	34.05%	896	31.91%	2,808
Broward	3,293	65.73%	1,717	34.27%	1,576	31.46%	5,010
Calhoun	1,331	91.16%	129	8.84%	1,202	82.33%	1,460
Charlotte	954	70.67%	396	29.33%	558	41.33%	1,350
Citrus	1,209	89.16%	147	10.84%	1,062	78.32%	1,356
Clay	1,285	69.80%	556	30.20%	729	39.60%	1,841
Collier	424	91.97%	37	8.03%	387	83.95%	461
Columbia	2,497	93.49%	174	6.51%	2,323	86.97%	2,671
Dade	17,820	65.84%	9,244	34.16%	8,576	31.69%	27,064
De Soto	1,624	76.24%	506	23.76%	1,118	52.49%	2,130
Dixie	1,096	95.22%	55	4.78%	1,041	90.44%	1,151
Duval	19,038	75.75%	6,096	24.25%	12,942	51.49%	25,134
Escambia	6,182	78.85%	1,658	21.15%	4,524	57.70%	7,840
Flagler	475	83.48%	94	16.52%	381	66.96%	569
Franklin	958	90.63%	99	9.37%	859	81.27%	1,057
Gadsden	1,865	94.67%	105	5.33%	1,760	89.34%	1,970
Gilchrist	814	93.46%	57	6.54%	757	86.91%	871
Glades	528	78.11%	148	21.89%	380	56.21%	676
Gulf	648	95.58%	30	4.42%	618	91.15%	678
Hamilton	1,161	91.35%	110	8.65%	1,051	82.69%	1,271
Hardee	2,485	81.45%	566	18.55%	1,919	62.90%	3,051
Hendry	683	80.73%	163	19.27%	520	61.47%	846
Hernando	1,097	80.96%	258	19.04%	839	61.92%	1,355
Highlands	1,525	64.18%	851	35.82%	674	28.37%	2,376
Hillsborough	19,143	80.25%	4,711	19.75%	14,432	60.50%	23,854
Holmes	2,701	86.29%	429	13.71%	2,272	72.59%	3,130
Indian River	1,308	74.57%	446	25.43%	862	49.14%	1,754
Jackson	4,832	88.97%	599	11.03%	4,233	77.94%	5,431
Jefferson	1,418	94.60%	81	5.40%	1,337	89.19%	1,499
Lafayette	929	97.18%	27	2.82%	902	94.35%	956
Lake	3,070	62.18%	1,867	37.82%	1,203	24.37%	4,937
Lee	2,557	72.44%	973	27.56%	1,584	44.87%	3,530
Leon	2,950	92.13%	252	7.87%	2,698	84.26%	3,202
Levy	1,621	92.95%	123	7.05%	1,498	85.89%	1,744
Liberty	682	95.65%	31	4.35%	651	91.30%	713
Madison	1,602	87.88%	221	12.12%	1,381	75.75%	1,823
Manatee	2,894	69.33%	1,280	30.67%	1,614	38.67%	4,174
Marion	3,208	76.93%	962	23.07%	2,246	53.86%	4,170
Martin	825	68.52%	379	31.48%	446	37.04%	1,204
Monroe	2,838	89.41%	336	10.59%	2,502	78.83%	3,174
Nassau	1,206	80.29%	296	19.71%	910	60.59%	1,502
Okaloosa	2,137	90.21%	232	9.79%	1,905	80.41%	2,369
Okeechobee	802	89.91%	90	10.09%	712	79.82%	892
Orange	4,877	58.07%	3,522	41.93%	1,355	16.13%	8,399
Osceola	1,656	64.64%	906	35.36%	750	29.27%	2,562
Palm Beach	7,734	65.88%	4,006	34.12%	3,728	31.75%	11,740
Pasco	2,504	75.65%	806	24.35%	1,698	51.30%	3,310
Pinellas	9,670	57.93%	7,024	42.07%	2,646	15.85%	16,694
Polk	9,463	73.06%	3,490	26.94%	5,973	46.11%	12,953
Putnam	2,309	71.71%	911	28.29%	1,398	43.42%	3,220
St. John's	3,344	72.55%	1,265	27.45%	2,079	45.11%	4,609
St. Lucie	1,602	80.42%	390	19.58%	1,212	60.84%	1,992
Santa Rosa	2,806	89.91%	315	10.09%	2,491	79.81%	3,121
Sarasota	1,912	74.14%	667	25.86%	1,245	48.27%	2,579
Seminole	2,142	69.32%	948	30.68%	1,194	38.64%	3,090
Sumter	2,138	88.57%	276	11.43%	1,862	77.13%	2,414
Suwannee	2,123	92.87%	163	7.13%	1,960	85.74%	2,286
Taylor	1,447	91.76%	130	8.24%	1,317	83.51%	1,577
Union	897	93.73%	60	6.27%	837	87.46%	957
Volusia	7,386	62.53%	4,425	37.47%	2,961	25.07%	11,811
Wakulla	1,036	98.11%	20	1.89%	1,016	96.21%	1,056
Walton	2,477	89.04%	305	10.96%	2,172	78.07%	2,782
Washington	2,424	87.54%	345	12.46%	2,079	75.08%	2,769
Totals	206,307	74.49%	69,170	24.98%	137,137	49.52%	276,943

==== Counties that flipped from Republican to Democratic ====
- Brevard
- Baker
- Broward
- Charlotte
- Clay
- Dade
- DeSoto
- Dixie
- Duval
- Escambia
- Flagler
- Glades
- Hardee
- Hendry
- Highlands
- Hillsborough
- Holmes
- Indian River
- Lake
- Lee
- Manatee
- Martin
- Marion
- Nassau
- Okaloosa
- Okeechobee
- Orange
- Osceola
- Palm Beach
- Pasco
- Polk
- Putnam
- Pinellas
- St. Lucie
- Santa Rosa
- Sarasota
- Volusia
- Seminole
- Sumter
- Walton
- Washington
