= Florida State Road 62 =

State highway in Florida, United States

State Road 62

Route information
- Maintained by FDOT
- Length: 37.433 mi (60.243 km)

Major junctions
- West end: US 301 in Parrish
- SR 37 at Duette
- East end: US 17 near Wauchula

Location
- Country: United States
- State: Florida
- Counties: Manatee, Hardee

Highway system
- Florida State Highway System; Interstate; US; State; Former; Pre‑1945; Toll; Scenic
← SR 61A	→ SR 63

State Road 62 (SR 62) is a 37-mile (60 km) state highway in Manatee and Hardee counties in the US state of Florida that passes through scrubland from Parrish to near Bowling Green.

== Route description ==
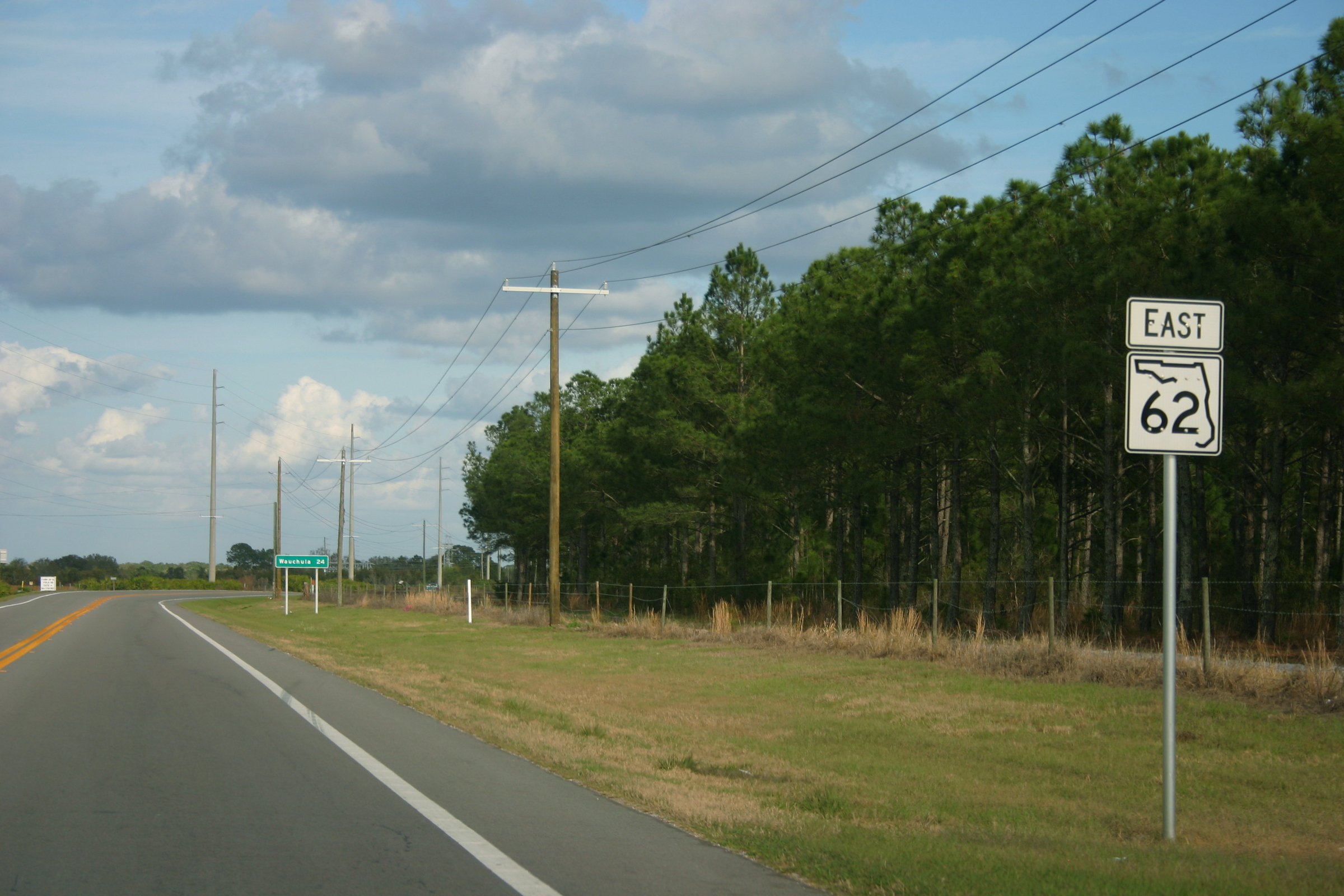
Sign for eastbound SR 62 in Duette, February 2012

The paved SR 62 is only two lanes wide over its entire route and cuts through the Manatee River basin. The road crosses Horse Creek and the North Fork of the Manatee River. It provides access to the Tampa Bay area from Hardee County.

Inside Duette, SR 62 meets with the intersection of Keentown Road. Keentown Road is a 1.8-mile (2.9 km) dirt road that leads into the hamlet of Keentown, a farming community. There are only 3 major junctions on this highway, Florida State Road 37, CR 39, and CR 663.

Five miles (8.0 km) east of Parrish is Lake Parrish, an artificial lake. It is home to an FPL power plant and a boat ramp.

In Hardee County, the road does not turn to the left or right for 14 miles (23 km) on its way to its southern terminus at U.S. Route 17.

== History ==
SR 62 was designated in 1945 after the 1945 Florida state road renumbering. Prior to 1945, it was designated as part of SR 32.

== Major intersections ==
County	Location	mi	km	Destinations	Notes
Manatee	Parrish	0.000	0.000	US 301 (SR 43) – Ellenton, Sun City Center	Western terminus
Manatee		8.326	13.399	Saffold Road	to CR 579
Manatee		17.116	27.546	CR 39 north – Plant City, Zephyrhills	
Manatee	Duette	19.226	30.941	SR 37 north – Mulberry	
Hardee	Fort Green Springs	29.957	48.211	CR 663 north – Hardee Lakes Park	west end of CR 663 concurrence
Hardee		30.469	49.035	CR 663 south	east end of CR 663 concurence
Hardee		37.433	60.243	US 17 (SR 35) – Bowling Green, Wauchula	Eastern terminus
1.000 mi = 1.609 km; 1.000 km = 0.621 mi
