= Fort Green Springs, Florida =

- Census-designated place
- Location within Florida Location within the United States
- Coordinates: 27°35′15″N 81°56′25″W
- Country: United States
- State: Florida
- County: Hardee

Area
  - Total: 10.37 sq mi (26.85 km^{2})
  - Land: 10.37 sq mi (26.85 km^{2})
  - Water: 0 sq mi (0.00 km^{2})
- Elevation: 118 ft (36 m)

Population (2020)
  - Total: 190
  - Density: 18.3/sq mi (7.08/km^{2})
- Time zone: UTC-5 (Eastern (EST))
  - Summer (DST): UTC-4 (EDT)
- Area code: 863
- GNIS feature ID: 2583344

Fort Green Springs is an unincorporated community and census-designated place (CDP) in Hardee County, Florida, United States. Its population was 190 as of the 2020 census.

== Geography ==
The community is in northwestern Hardee County and is bordered to the north by Fort Green. Florida State Road 62 passes through Fort Green Springs, leading east 7 miles (11 km) to U.S. Route 17 at a point 3 miles (5 km) north of Wauchula, the county seat, and west 30 miles (48 km) to U.S. Route 301 at Parrish.

According to the U.S. Census Bureau, the CDP has an area of 10.368 square miles (26.85 km^{2}), all of it land.

== Demographics ==
Historical population
Census	Pop.	Note	%±
2020	190		—
U.S. Decennial Census

Fort Green Springs first appeared as a census designated place in the 2010 U.S. census.
