= William Iredell Turner =

Floridian pioneer and soldier (1812–1881)

- Born: June 7, 1812; New Kent County, Virginia, US
- Died: October 28, 1881 (aged 69); Manatee County, Florida, US
- Known for: Helping to found Bradenton and Parrish.
- Spouse: Ida Isabella Higginbotham
- Military career
- Allegiance: United States; Confederate States
- Branch: United States Army; Confederate States Army
- Service years: 1828-1837; 1860-1865
- Rank: Colonel

William Iredell Turner (June 7, 1812 – October 28, 1881), also occasionally and erroneously referred to as William J. Turner, was a Florida pioneer, County Commissioner, and a Soldier who helped establish Bradenton, Florida and Parrish, Florida.

Turner was born in Virginia on June 7, 1812. When he was about sixteen years old, he enlisted in the military. He fought during the Second Seminole War, during which time he was injured in the neck. He was discharged from the military in August 1837 but returned to a militia role during the American Civil War, where he served as a Colonel for the Florida State Militia (8th FL) and commanded Fort Brooke in 1861. Prior to the Civil War Turner owned and ran Oak Hill, a large plantation in Manatee County, Florida that today is called Parrish, FL.

Turner served as County Commissioner for Alachua County when Gainesville was created and was decisive in naming it for Gen. Edmund P. Gaines. He was a proponent of secession and had unsuccessfully run for a seat in the Florida House of Representatives. However, he is known to have been elected to the Florida Senate in 1865.

Turner established an inn, general store, post office and wharf on nine acres that he subdivided on the bank of the Manatee River on what was to become Main Street of Bradenton, FL.

Turner died on October 28, 1881, and is buried alongside his wife Isabella at the Parrish Cemetery.
