= Moffit, Florida =

US ghost town

Coordinates: 27.454762°N 81.796749°W

Moffitt is a ghost town in Hardee County, Florida, United States.

== Overview ==
Moffitt gets its name from its founder John Moffitt. Moffit was founded when the former Florida Southern Railway was built. The town of Moffit had a post office from 1900 to 1916. Moffitt's residents mostly worked in the lumber mill or through farming and cattle. When the trees ran out the lumber mill closed and the town's people moved elsewhere. Later the tracks and railroad went away and the town today is a rural area.

== See also ==
- List of ghost towns in Florida
