= Florida State Road 66 =

State highway in Florida, United States

State Road 66

Route information
- Maintained by FDOT
- Length: 25.024 mi (40.272 km)
- Existed: 1945–present

Major junctions
- West end: US 17 in Zolfo Springs
- East end: US 27 / US 98 near DeSoto City

Location
- Country: United States
- State: Florida
- Counties: Hardee, Highlands

Highway system
- Florida State Highway System; Interstate; US; State; Former; Pre‑1945; Toll; Scenic
← SR 65	→ SR 68

State Road 66 (SR 66) is a 25-mile-long east–west state highway in Hardee County and Highlands County. Its western terminus is an intersection with US 17 (SR 35) in Zolfo Springs; the eastern terminus is an intersection with US 27-98 (SR 25-700) near DeSoto City. The eastern continuation of SR 66 is eastbound US 98-SR 700 toward Okeechobee and West Palm Beach.

State Road 66 snakes through farmlands, woodlands, and wetlands in a sparsely populated region of southern Florida. Near Crewsville, SR 66 provides access (via South Hammock Road, Washington Road, and Hammock Road) to Highlands Hammock State Park. It is part of what's known as the Florida Cracker Trail.

== Major intersections ==
County	Location	mi	km	Destinations	Notes
Hardee	Zolfo Springs	0.000	0.000	US 17 (SR 35) to SR 64 – Arcadia, Wauchula	Western terminus; continues as 6th Street West for two blocks
Highlands		18.745	30.167	CR 635 north – Highlands Hammock State Park	
Highlands		25.024	40.272	US 27 / US 98 (SR 25 / SR 700) – Sebring, Lake Placid, Okeechobee, West Palm Beach	Eastern terminus; continues as southbound US 98
1.000 mi = 1.609 km; 1.000 km = 0.621 mi
