= Florida Cracker Trail =

American cattle and horse route

Coordinates: 27.4992491°N 81.7919231°W

- Sign for the Florida Cracker Trail along State Road 66 between Lake Placid and Sebring.
- Length: 120 miles (190 km)
- Location: Manatee County, Florida

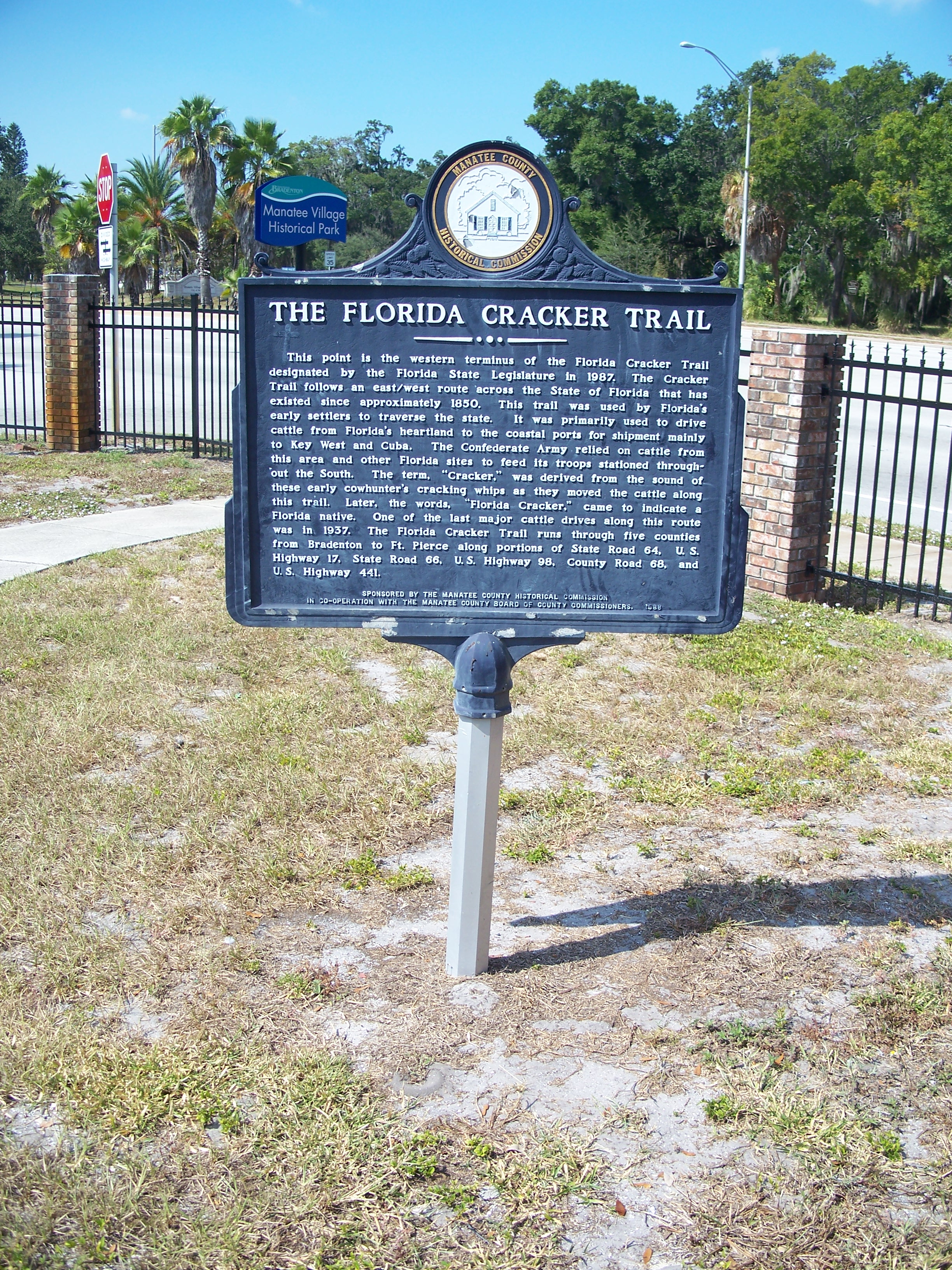
Historical marker in the Manatee Village Historical Park in Bradenton, at the western end of the Trail

The Florida Cracker Trail runs from just east of Bradenton, and ends in Fort Pierce, a total distance of approximately 120 miles (190 km). In years past, this route was used for cattle and horses. Today it includes parts of State Road 66, State Road 64, and U.S. Highway 98.

== Events ==
On 20 November 2000, the Florida Cracker Trail was selected as a Community Millennium Trail. The Millennium Trails is a partnership among the White House Millennium Council, the Department of Transportation, Rails-to-Trails Conservancy, the National Endowment for the Arts, and other public agencies and private organizations. The goal of Millennium Trails is the creation of a nationwide network of trails that protect the natural environment, interpret history and culture, and enhance alternative transportation, recreation, and tourism.

An annual Cracker Trail ride is now held the last full week in February of each year. The ride begins at a site just east of Bradenton, Florida, and ends with a parade through downtown Ft. Pierce, Florida, a total of approximately 120 miles (190 km). Each day's ride is approximately 15 to 20 miles in length. The purpose of the ride is to draw attention to Florida's horse and cattle heritage.

== See also ==
- Florida cracker
- Cracker (white)
