= Lake Parrish =

Lake in Florida, United States

- Location within Florida Location within the United States
- Location: Manatee County, Florida
- Coordinates: 27°37′11″N 82°19′33″W
- Type: Reservoir
- Primary inflows: Little Manatee River
- Basin countries: United States
- Max. length: 2.89 mi (4.65 km)
- Max. width: 2.38 mi (3.83 km)
- Surface area: 3,560 acres (1,441 ha)
- Average depth: 4.8 ft (1.5 m)
- Settlements: Willow

Lake Parrish, built in the middle of the 1970s by Florida Power & Light (FPL), is a lake that provides water to be used for the Manatee power plant. This lake is surrounded by grassland, except on the southwest corner, where the power plant is located. This lake is somewhat rectangular and is surrounded on the south, west, north and the northeast by a long levee. Two access roads originate at the power plant and extend into the lake far to the north and east. State Road 62 is roughly 1,000 feet (300 m) south of Lake Parrish.
