= Florida State Road 636 =

State highway in Florida, United States

State Road 636
- East Main Street

Route information
- Maintained by FDOT
- Length: 6.969 mi (11.216 km)

Major junctions
- West end: US 17 / CR 64A in Wauchula
- East end: SR 64 near Wauchula

Location
- Country: United States
- State: Florida
- Counties: Hardee

Highway system
- Florida State Highway System; Interstate; US; State; Former; Pre‑1945; Toll; Scenic
← SR 620	→ SR 651

State Road 636 (SR 636) is a 6.969-mile-long (11.216 km) state highway in Hardee County, Florida, that runs from U.S. Route 17 (US 17) and County Road 64A in Wauchula to SR 64 east of Wauchula.

== Route description ==
State Road 636 begins at Sixth Avenue which is southbound US Route 17 (SR 35) and serves as the dividing line between north and south Avenues. One block later the road crosses South Fifth Avenue/North George Burris Avenue, and immediately after passing the former Atlantic Coast Line Railroad Depot on the northeast corner of that intersection has another intersection with northbound US 17/SR 35. Leaving downtown, the only other road resembling a major intersection is Griffin Road. The route still carries East Main Street as the street name even after crossing a bridge over the Peace River, as well as a slightly shorter bridge above an overflow creek. The rest of the route travels in a straight west to east line in a largely rural setting, though the number of paved intersection outnumber unpaved ones. East of Wells Road, State Road 636 terminates at Florida State Road 64, but eastbound SR 64 momentarily curves north in a T intersection with SR 636 when the route ends.

== Major intersections ==
The entire route is in Hardee County.

Location	mi	km	Destinations	Notes
Wauchula	0.000– 0.078	0.000– 0.126	US 17 (North Sixth Avenue / SR 35) / CR 64A west (West Main Street)	Western terminus; continues as CR 64A beyond US 17
	6.969	11.216	SR 64	Eastern terminus
1.000 mi = 1.609 km; 1.000 km = 0.621 mi
