= Limestone, Florida =

- Census-designated place
- Location within Florida Location within the United States
- Coordinates: 27°21′56″N 81°53′56″W
- Country: United States
- State: Florida
- County: Hardee

Area
  - Total: 23.76 sq mi (61.55 km^{2})
  - Land: 23.76 sq mi (61.55 km^{2})
  - Water: 0 sq mi (0.00 km^{2})
- Elevation: 59 ft (18 m)

Population (2020)
  - Total: 157
  - Density: 6.6/sq mi (2.55/km^{2})
- Time zone: UTC-5 (Eastern (EST))
  - Summer (DST): UTC-4 (EDT)
- ZIP code: 33865
- Area code: 863
- GNIS feature ID: 285531

Limestone is an unincorporated community and census-designated place in Hardee County, Florida, United States. Its population was 157 as of the 2020 census.

== Geography ==
Limestone is in southwestern Hardee County and is bordered to the south by Desoto County. It is 15 miles (24 km) southwest of Zolfo Springs and 12 miles (19 km) northwest of Arcadia.

According to the U.S. Census Bureau, the CDP has an area of 23.764 square miles (61.55 km^{2}), all of it land.

== Demographics ==
Historical population
Census	Pop.	Note	%±
2020	157		—
U.S. Decennial Census

Limestone first appeared as a census designated place in the 2010 U.S. census.
