= Gardner, Florida =

- Census-designated place
- Location within Florida Location within the United States
- Coordinates: 27°21′06″N 81°47′59″W
- Country: United States
- State: Florida
- County: Hardee

Area
  - Total: 7.71 sq mi (19.96 km^{2})
  - Land: 7.70 sq mi (19.95 km^{2})
  - Water: 0.0039 sq mi (0.01 km^{2})
- Elevation: 72 ft (22 m)

Population (2020)
  - Total: 364
  - Density: 47.3/sq mi (18.25/km^{2})
- Time zone: UTC-5 (Eastern (EST))
  - Summer (DST): UTC-4 (EDT)
- ZIP code: 33890
- Area code: 863
- GNIS feature ID: 2583348

Gardner is an unincorporated community and census-designated place in Hardee County, Florida, United States. Its population was 364 as of the 2020 census. It is located on U.S. Route 17 about 11 miles (18 km) north of Arcadia.

== Demographics ==
Historical population
Census	Pop.	Note	%±
2020	364		—
U.S. Decennial Census

Gardner first appeared as a census designated place in the 2010 U.S. census.
