= Fort Green, Florida =

- Census-designated place
- Location within Florida Location within the United States
- Coordinates: 27°37′12″N 81°56′24″W
- Country: United States
- State: Florida
- County: Hardee

Area
  - Total: 4.04 sq mi (10.47 km^{2})
  - Land: 4.04 sq mi (10.47 km^{2})
  - Water: 0 sq mi (0.00 km^{2})
- Elevation: 112 ft (34 m)

Population (2020)
  - Total: 78
  - Density: 19.3/sq mi (7.45/km^{2})
- Time zone: UTC-5 (Eastern (EST))
  - Summer (DST): UTC-4 (EDT)
- ZIP code: 33834
- Area code: 863
- GNIS feature ID: 2583345

Fort Green is an unincorporated community and census-designated place (CDP) in Hardee County, Florida, United States. Its population was 78 as of the 2020 census.

== Geography ==
Fort Green is in northwestern Hardee County, bordered to the north by Polk County and to the south by Fort Green Springs. Brewster Road is the main road through the community, leading south 1 mile (1.6 km) to State Road 62 in Fort Green Springs and north 13 miles (21 km) to State Road 37 at Bradley Junction. Fort Green is 12 miles (19 km) northwest of Wauchula, the Hardee County seat.

According to the U.S. Census Bureau, the Fort Green CDP has an area of 4.042 square miles (10.47 km^{2}), all of it land. Payne Creek, an east-flowing tributary of the Peace River, forms the southern border of the CDP.

== Demographics ==
Historical population
Census	Pop.	Note	%±
2020	78		—
U.S. Decennial Census

Fort Green first appeared as a census designated place in the 2010 U.S. census.
