= Bethany, Florida =

- Unincorporated community
- Location within Florida Location within the United States
- Coordinates: 27°28′27″N 82°15′51″W
- Country: United States
- State: Florida
- County: Manatee
- Elevation: 66 ft (20 m)
- Time zone: UTC-5 (EST)
  - Summer (DST): UTC-4 (EDT)
- Area code: 941
- FIPS code: 12-05850
- GNIS feature ID: 300018

Bethany is an unincorporated community in Manatee County, Florida, United States. The community was previously known as Riley.

== History ==
Advertised as an “ideal and natural orange land,” a post office was established at what was then Riley on October 12, 1894. The community was named for one of its earliest property owners and first postmaster, William O’Riley. That same year, a church established by O'Riley was built in Riley and named Bethany Missionary Baptist Church. A school was also opened and was called Bethany School. By 1897, the Riley community was home to 14 households.

As the citrus industry in the area grew, new nearby communities such as Waterbury and Oak Knoll were developed. The Riley Post Office was discontinued on April 7, 1914, in favor of delivery at the newly established Oak Knoll post office.

After the post office closed and there was no official reason to refer to the area as Riley, it quickly became known by Bethany in reference to the community's school and church.
