= Perico, Florida =

Island in Manatee County, United States of America

Coordinates: 27.5023°N 82.6822°W

Perico Island is a small island just west of the Palma Sola area in Manatee County. It is a residential community with a hotel, marina, and several natural preserve areas.

== History ==
Perico Island is named after an early resident who was a Cuban fisherman named Perico Pompon. By 1841 he would live on an island located at the mouth of the Manatee River but it is unclear whether this island is Perico Island. Pompoon was accompanied by two other fisherman named: Phillippi Bermudez and Manuel Olivella who lived and worked on the island.

In the 1940s and 1950s, archaeological studies conducted on Perico Island determined that the island may have been home to one of the oldest located Native American settlements in the Tampa Bay area. Archeologist Gordon Willey determined that Timucuan Indians lived and fished on Perico for several generations. Willey excavated Belle Glade pottery on Perico Island dating back as far as 950 B.C.

In the 1880s, more fishermen began settling on the island. A post office opened on the island in 1891 with Maggie Johnstone serving as postmistress. However, it was replaced within a few years with an office in the larger adjacent community of Palma Sola. By the 1890s the island was home to a hotel called Hunter’s Point Hotel which advertised hunting, fishing, and boating excursions. In addition to its fishing culture, the island quickly filled with orange grove tracts as well as pineapple and guava farms. The north end of the island remained undeveloped, comprising over 100 acres of pine timber land.

Perico struggled to compete in agriculture with adjacent areas due to a lack of transportation options. Produce and other products had to be shipped out of Bradenton or Cortez due to the lack of a marina on the island. In 1914 plans were made to continue Manatee Avenue with a bridge across Perico Bayou onto Perico Island but was delayed until 1922. The bridge was completed as part of a greater project to connect Anna Maria Island via Perico Island to the mainland. Prior to the construction of the bridge, few people lived permanently on the island, although several Bradenton residents had small farms or second homes on the island. Those that used the island as a residence or for farmland traveled back and forth between the mainland by driving across flats in the bayou at low tide or by boat. After the construction of the bridge, much of the uncleared land on the island began being sold for development.

Since the 1960s, Perico Island has been the setting of many legal battles between developers and residents who wished to maintain the natural resources of the island.
