= Lemon Grove, Florida =

- Census-designated place
- Location within Florida Location within the United States
- Coordinates: 27°33′30″N 81°40′41″W
- Country: United States
- State: Florida
- County: Hardee

Area
  - Total: 29.85 sq mi (77.30 km^{2})
  - Land: 29.83 sq mi (77.27 km^{2})
  - Water: 0.0077 sq mi (0.02 km^{2})
- Elevation: 125 ft (38 m)

Population (2020)
  - Total: 637
  - Density: 21.3/sq mi (8.24/km^{2})
- Time zone: UTC-5 (Eastern (EST))
  - Summer (DST): UTC-4 (EDT)
- Area code: 863
- GNIS feature ID: 294832

Lemon Grove is an unincorporated community and census-designated place in Hardee County, Florida, United States. Its population was 637 as of the 2020 census. Florida State Road 64 passes through the community.

== Geography ==
Lemon Grove is in northeastern Hardee County, 8 miles (13 km) east of Wauchula, the county seat, and 11 miles (18 km) west of Avon Park.

According to the U.S. Census Bureau, the community has an area of 29.845 square miles (77.30 km^{2}); 29.836 square miles (77.27 km^{2}) of its area is land, and 0.009 square miles (0.023 km^{2}) is water. Charlie Creek, a south-flowing tributary of the Peace River, is the primary water body in the area.

== Demographics ==
Historical population
Census	Pop.	Note	%±
2020	637		—
U.S. Decennial Census

Lemon Grove first appeared as a census designated place in the 2010 U.S. census.
