= Ona, Florida =

- Census-designated place
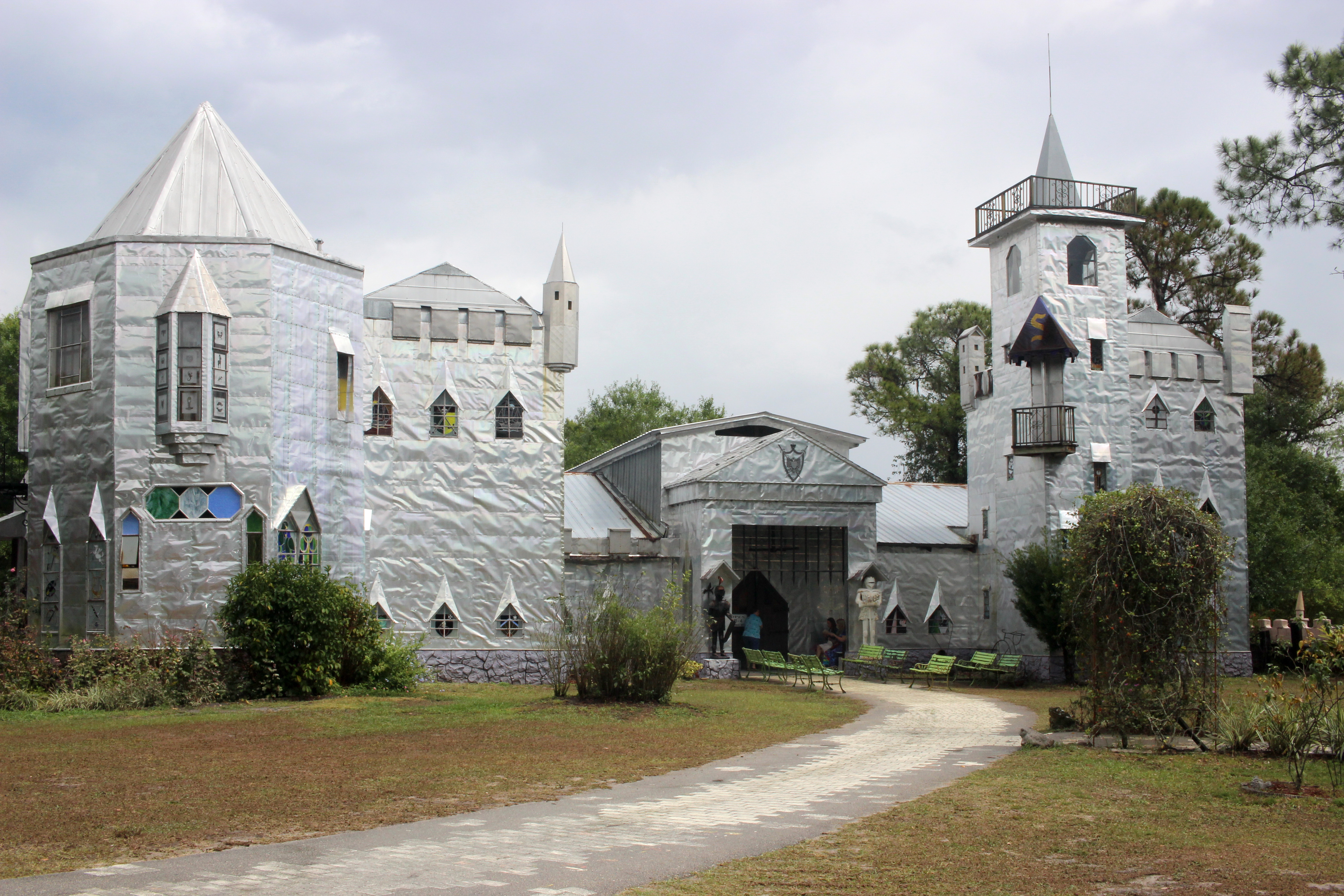
- "Solomon's Castle" is a visitor attraction in Ona, Florida

- Location within Florida Location within the United States
- Coordinates: 27°28′55″N 81°55′08″W
- Country: United States
- State: Florida
- County: Hardee

Area
  - Total: 26.72 sq mi (69.20 km^{2})
  - Land: 26.72 sq mi (69.20 km^{2})
  - Water: 0 sq mi (0.00 km^{2})
- Elevation: 85 ft (26 m)

Population (2020)
  - Total: 199
  - Density: 7.5/sq mi (2.88/km^{2})
- Time zone: UTC-5 (Eastern (EST))
  - Summer (DST): UTC-4 (EDT)
- ZIP code: 33865
- Area code: 863
- GNIS feature ID: 2583372

Ona is an unincorporated community and census-designated place in Hardee County, Florida, United States. Its population was 199 as of the 2020 census. Ona has a post office with ZIP code 33865, which opened on October 11, 1897. State Road 64 and a CSX Transportation line pass through the community.

== Demographics ==
Historical population
Census	Pop.	Note	%±
2020	199		—
U.S. Decennial Census

Ona first appeared as a census designated place in the 2010 U.S. census.
