= Parrish, Florida =

- Unincorporated community
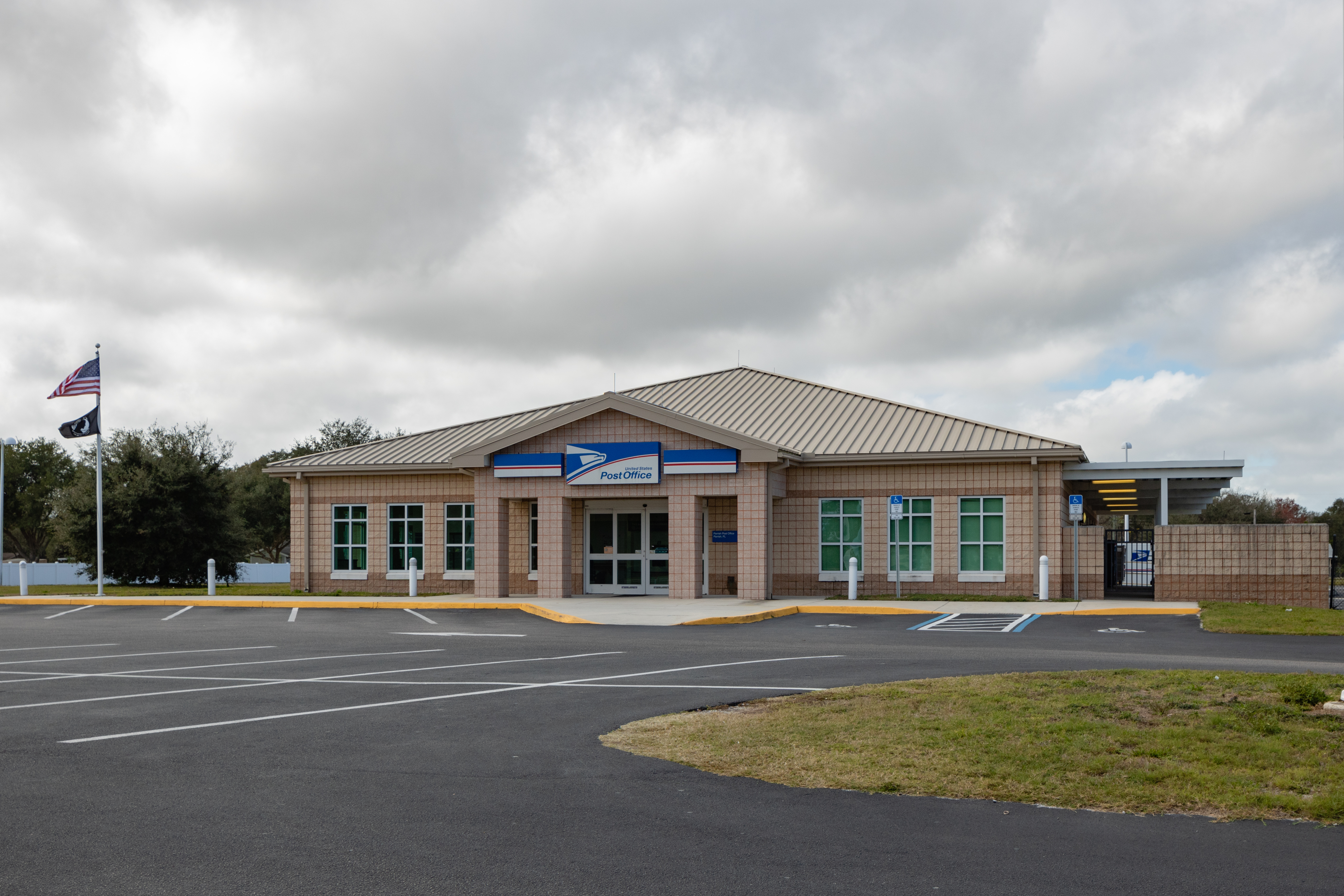
- The Parrish Post Office in 2019

- Location within Florida Location within the United States
- Coordinates: 27°35′15″N 82°25′30″W
- Country: United States
- State: Florida
- County: Manatee
- Named for: Crawford Parrish
- Elevation: 43 ft (13 m)
- Time zone: UTC-5 (EST)
  - Summer (DST): UTC-4 (EDT)
- ZIP code: 34219
- Area code: 941
- FIPS code: 12-55275
- GNIS feature ID: 288540

Parrish is an unincorporated community in northwestern Manatee County, Florida, United States.

The community is located near the intersection of U.S. 301 and State Road 62 and is part of the North Port–Sarasota–Bradenton Metropolitan Statistical Area.

Parrish contains the Florida Railroad Museum, which operates weekend passenger rides round trip from Parrish about 6 miles (9.7 km) northeast to Willow.

== History ==
The first "settlers" in the area were William B. Hooker and William H. Johnson, who established a plantation named Oak Hill in 1850 in an unsuccessful attempt to grow sea island cotton. This plantation burned down in the Seminole Wars but the area continued to be referred to as Oak Hill. William Turner made a homestead at Oak Hill in 1865 but only stayed for a few years before establishing Bradenton.

In 1868, Turner sold the land to Crawford Parrish and his wife Mary Bratcher VanZant. Parrish, a rancher and orange farmer originally from Georgia, sold his plantation on the banks of the Suwannee River that he had held since 1841 and moved to present day Parrish which was, at the time, still referred to as Oak Hill.

The Parish Post Office was established in 1879, effectively changing the spelling of the town's name to Parish, until 1950 when the spelling was officially changed back to Parrish. Compiled in the late 1930s and first published in 1939, the Florida guide listed Parrish's population as 721 and described it as "a citrus-fruit and vegetable shipping center". Parrish was a small agriculture community until the late 2000s when agricultural land began to be developed into residential subdivisions.

== Climate ==
Climate data for Parrish, Florida, 1991–2020 normals, extremes 1957–2014
Month	Jan	Feb	Mar	Apr	May	Jun	Jul	Aug	Sep	Oct	Nov	Dec	Year
Record high °F (°C)	92 (33)	90 (32)	92 (33)	95 (35)	98 (37)	101 (38)	99 (37)	101 (38)	97 (36)	98 (37)	92 (33)	89 (32)	101 (38)
Mean maximum °F (°C)	82.7 (28.2)	83.2 (28.4)	85.8 (29.9)	88.5 (31.4)	92.5 (33.6)	94.8 (34.9)	94.5 (34.7)	94.5 (34.7)	93.0 (33.9)	90.4 (32.4)	86.6 (30.3)	83.8 (28.8)	95. (35)
Mean daily maximum °F (°C)	71.8 (22.1)	74.3 (23.5)	77.4 (25.2)	81.7 (27.6)	86.6 (30.3)	89.2 (31.8)	90.0 (32.2)	90.0 (32.2)	88.4 (31.3)	84.1 (28.9)	78.2 (25.7)	74.0 (23.3)	82.1 (27.8)
Daily mean °F (°C)	61.1 (16.2)	63.4 (17.4)	66.9 (19.4)	71.8 (22.1)	76.9 (24.9)	80.9 (27.2)	82.1 (27.8)	82.3 (27.9)	80.9 (27.2)	75.6 (24.2)	68.4 (20.2)	63.8 (17.7)	72.8 (22.7)
Mean daily minimum °F (°C)	50.4 (10.2)	52.6 (11.4)	56.4 (13.6)	61.9 (16.6)	67.2 (19.6)	72.6 (22.6)	74.2 (23.4)	74.5 (23.6)	73.4 (23.0)	67.1 (19.5)	58.5 (14.7)	53.5 (11.9)	63.5 (17.5)
Mean minimum °F (°C)	31.2 (−0.4)	34.6 (1.4)	40.7 (4.8)	44.8 (7.1)	56.2 (13.4)	64.8 (18.2)	68.8 (20.4)	69.1 (20.6)	65.9 (18.8)	51.6 (10.9)	42.7 (5.9)	34.5 (1.4)	28.9 (−1.7)
Record low °F (°C)	18 (−8)	24 (−4)	29 (−2)	34 (1)	44 (7)	51 (11)	61 (16)	61 (16)	57 (14)	42 (6)	25 (−4)	20 (−7)	18 (−8)
Average precipitation inches (mm)	3.04 (77)	2.14 (54)	2.77 (70)	3.16 (80)	3.05 (77)	8.33 (212)	7.92 (201)	8.99 (228)	8.34 (212)	2.61 (66)	1.69 (43)	2.39 (61)	54.43 (1,383)
Average precipitation days (≥ 0.01 in)	6.0	5.1	6.2	4.8	5.1	12.7	15.9	15.6	12.8	5.9	3.9	5.7	99.7
Source: NOAA (mean maxima/minima 1981–2010)

== See also ==
- Lake Parrish
