= Oak Grove, Hardee County, Florida =

- Unincorporated community
- Location within Florida Location within the United States
- Coordinates: 27°28′56″N 81°52′17″W
- Country: United States
- State: Florida
- County: Hardee
- Elevation: 92 ft (28 m)
- Time zone: UTC-5 (Eastern (EST))
  - Summer (DST): UTC-4 (EDT)
- Area code: 863
- GNIS feature ID: 287931

Oak Grove is an unincorporated community in Hardee County, Florida, United States.
