= Bowling Green, Florida =

- City
- City of Bowling Green
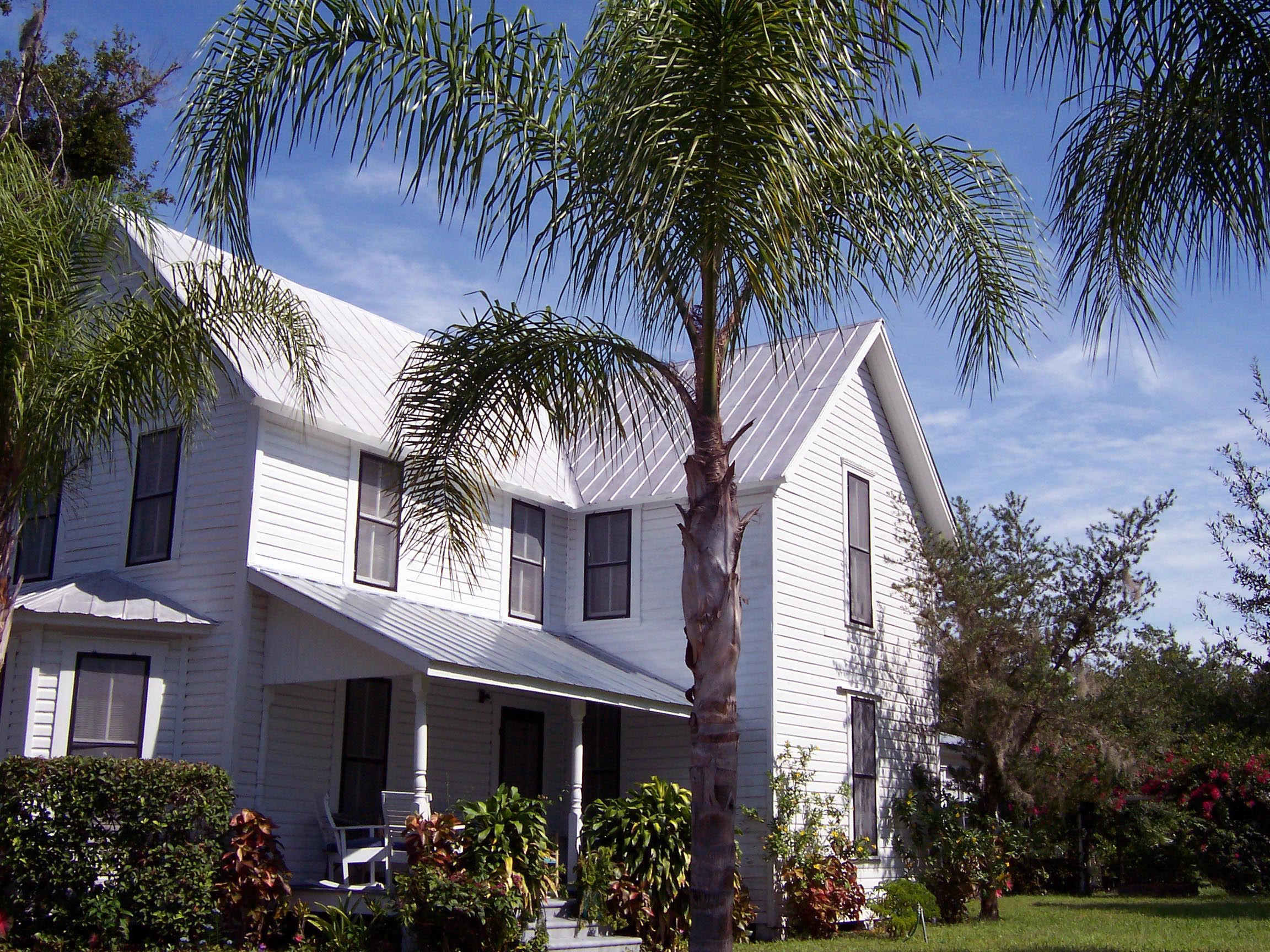
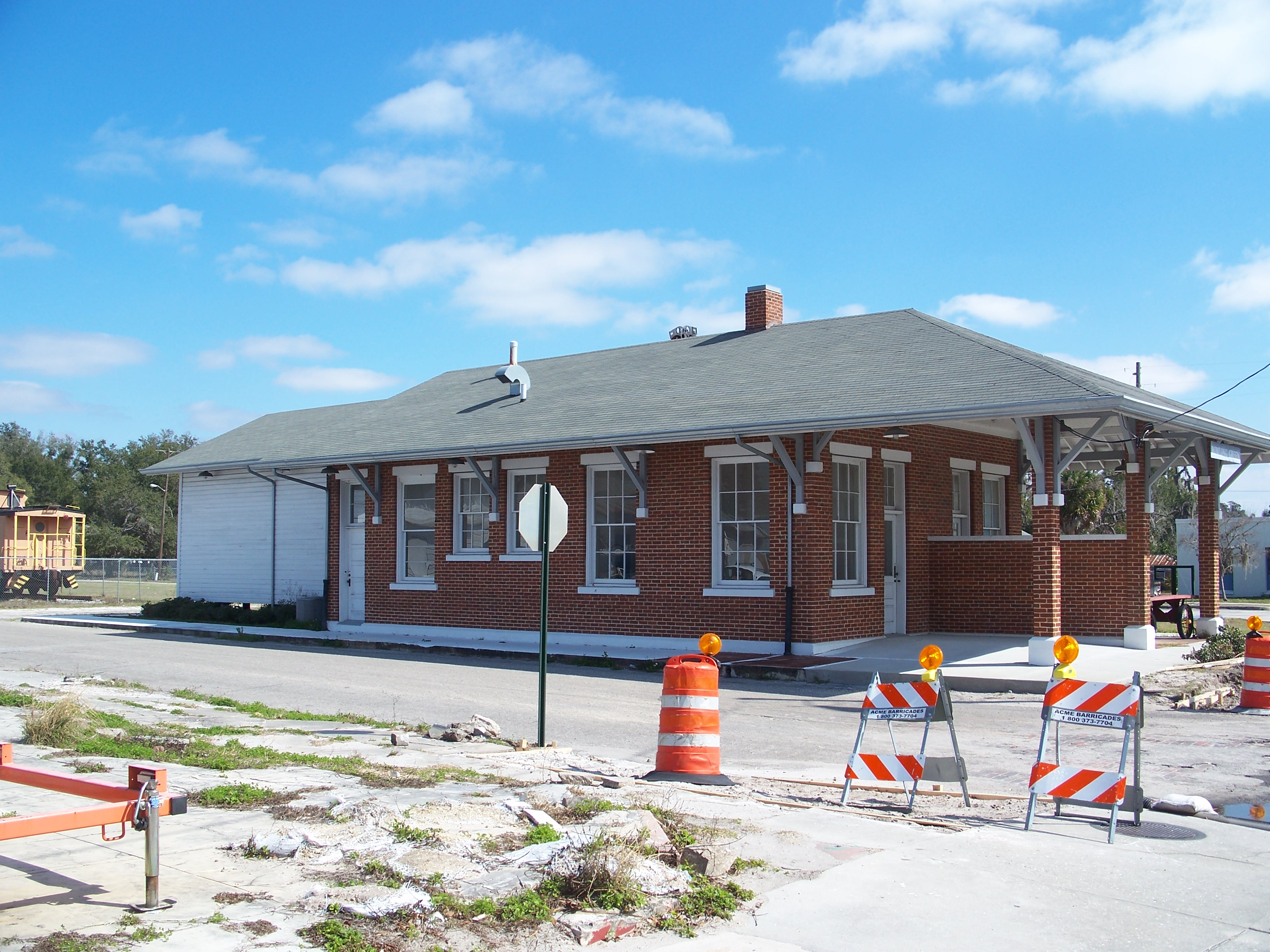
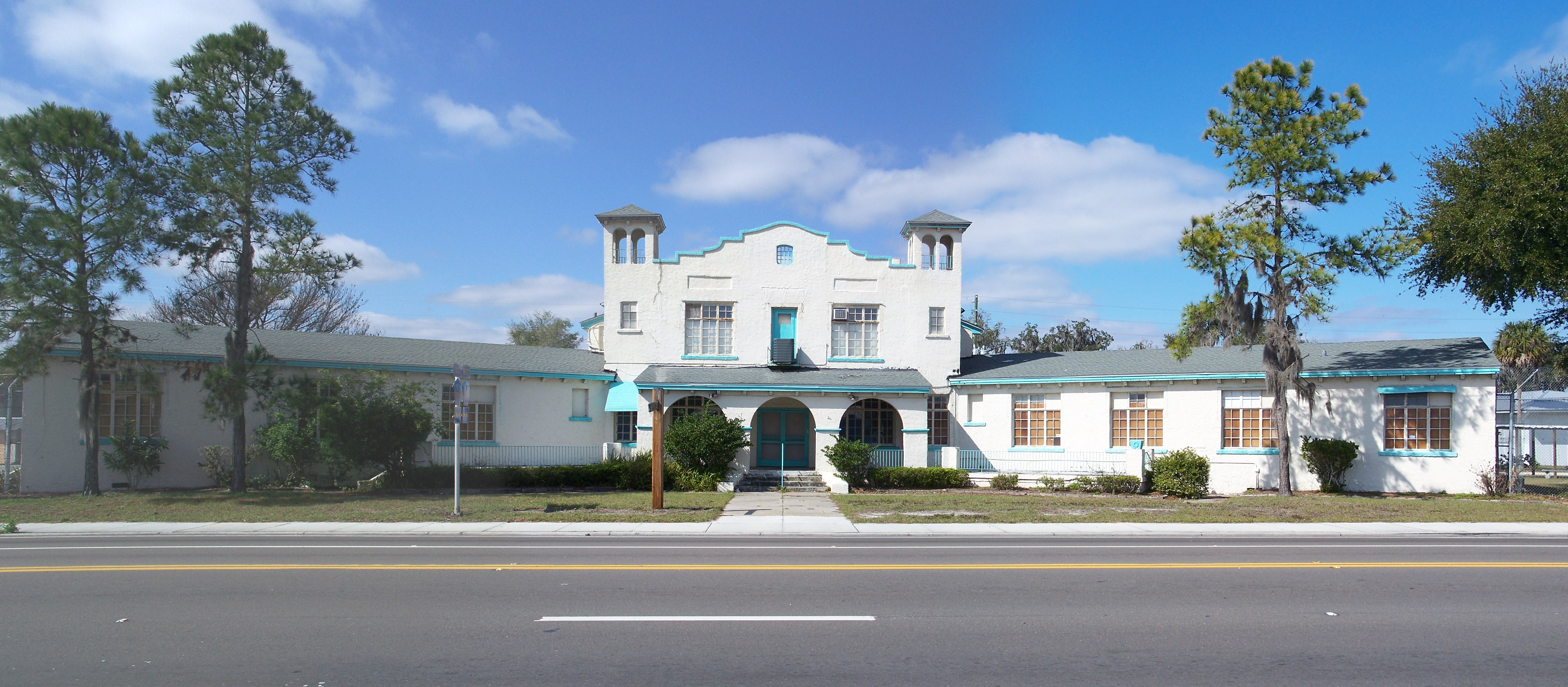
- From top, left to right: Pioneer Home, Historic Bowling Green Train Depot, Green Hotel

- Logo

- Location in Hardee County and the state of Florida
- Coordinates: 27°38′17″N 81°49′28″W
- Country: United States
- State: Florida
- County: Hardee
- Settled: 1883
- Incorporated: 1927
- Named after: Bowling Green, Kentucky

Government
  - Type: Commission-Manager
  - Mayor: Sam Fite
  - Vice Mayor: N'Kosi L. Jones
  - Commissioners: David Durastanti, Francisco Arreola, and Kent Peterson
  - City Manager: Dawn Page
  - City Clerk: Bonnie Carrillo

Area
  - Total: 1.27 sq mi (3.28 km^{2})
  - Land: 1.26 sq mi (3.27 km^{2})
  - Water: 0 sq mi (0.00 km^{2})
- Elevation: 115 ft (35 m)

Population (2020)
  - Total: 2,405
  - Density: 1,903/sq mi (734.9/km^{2})
- Time zone: UTC-5 (Eastern (EST))
  - Summer (DST): UTC-4 (EDT)
- ZIP code: 33834
- Area code: 863
- FIPS code: 12-07775
- GNIS feature ID: 2403904
- Website: www.bowlinggreenfl.net

Bowling Green is a city in Hardee County, Florida, United States. The population was 2,405 at the 2020 census.

== History ==
One of the first settlers of the vicinity, A.M. Chester of Bowling Green, Kentucky, established a homestead in 1883. In 1886, he gave 40 acres (16 hectares) to the Florida Southern Railway, a service that continues to operate in the area. As it began to develop, the industries of citrus farming and phosphate mining took hold within the city.

The City of Bowling Green was officially incorporated as a municipality in 1927.

== Geography ==
According to the United States Census Bureau, the city has a total area of 1.4 square miles (3.6 km^{2}), all land.

=== Climate ===
The climate in this area is characterized by hot, humid summers and generally mild winters. According to the Köppen climate classification, the City of Bowling Green has a humid subtropical climate zone (Cfa).

== Demographics ==
Historical population
Census	Pop.	Note	%±
1910	422		—
1920	692		64.0%
1930	1,025		48.1%
1940	950		−7.3%
1950	884		−6.9%
1960	1,171		32.5%
1970	1,357		15.9%
1980	2,310		70.2%
1990	1,836		−20.5%
2000	2,755		50.1%
2010	2,930		6.4%
2020	2,405		−17.9%
U.S. Decennial Census

=== Racial and ethnic composition ===
Bowling Green racial composition (Hispanics excluded from racial categories) (NH = Non-Hispanic)
Race	Pop 2010	Pop 2020	% 2010	% 2020
White (NH)	862	734	29.42%	30.52%
Black or African American (NH)	289	221	9.86%	9.19%
Native American or Alaska Native (NH)	12	5	0.41%	0.21%
Asian (NH)	15	2	0.51%	0.08%
Pacific Islander or Native Hawaiian (NH)	1	0	0.03%	0.00%
Some other race (NH)	0	4	0.00%	0.17%
Two or more races/Multiracial (NH)	41	33	1.40%	1.37%
Hispanic or Latino (any race)	1,710	1,406	58.36%	58.46%
Total	2,930	2,405		

=== 2020 census ===
As of the 2020 United States census, Bowling Green had a population of 2,405. The median age was 33.3 years. 30.0% of residents were under the age of 18 and 15.7% of residents were 65 years of age or older. For every 100 females there were 100.1 males, and for every 100 females age 18 and over there were 99.1 males age 18 and over.

0.0% of residents lived in urban areas, while 100.0% lived in rural areas.

There were 734 households in Bowling Green, of which 44.3% had children under the age of 18 living in them. Of all households, 48.6% were married-couple households, 16.5% were households with a male householder and no spouse or partner present, and 28.5% were households with a female householder and no spouse or partner present. About 17.1% of all households were made up of individuals and 10.1% had someone living alone who was 65 years of age or older.

There were 969 housing units, of which 24.3% were vacant. The homeowner vacancy rate was 1.1% and the rental vacancy rate was 9.5%.

According to the US Census Bureau's 2020 American Community Survey 5-year estimates, there were 528 families residing in the city.

=== 2010 census ===
As of the 2010 United States census, there were 2,930 people, 670 households, and 555 families residing in the city.

=== 2000 census ===
At the 2000 census, there were 2,892 people in 815 households, including 647 families, in the city. The population density was 2,042.0 inhabitants per square mile (788.4/km^{2}). There were 933 housing units at an average density of 658.8 per square mile (254.4/km^{2}). The racial makeup of the city was 57.05% White, 13.52% African American, 0.83% Native American, 0.35% Asian, 0.31% Pacific Islander, 26.00% from other races, and 1.94% from two or more races. Hispanic or Latino of any race were 46.06%.

Of the 815 households in 2000, 41.3% had children under the age of 18 living with them, 54.5% were married couples living together, 18.3% had a female householder with no husband present, and 20.6% were non-families. 12.8% of households were one person and 7.1% were one person aged 65 or older. The average household size was 3.44 and the average family size was 3.68.

The age distribution in 2000 was 33.1% under the age of 18, 12.2% from 18 to 24, 27.8% from 25 to 44, 16.0% from 45 to 64, and 10.9% 65 or older. The median age was 28 years. For every 100 females, there were 108.8 males. For every 100 females age 18 and over, there were 106.7 males.

In 2000, the median household income was $28,209 and the median family income was $28,333. Males had a median income of $22,695 versus $17,125 for females. The per capita income for the city was $9,978. About 22.0% of families and 30.5% of the population were below the poverty line, including 33.5% of those under age 18 and 20.5% of those age 65 or over.

== Education ==
The sole school district of the county is the Hardee County School District.

== See also ==
- Streamsong Resort
