= Hardee County, Florida =

County in Florida, United States

- County
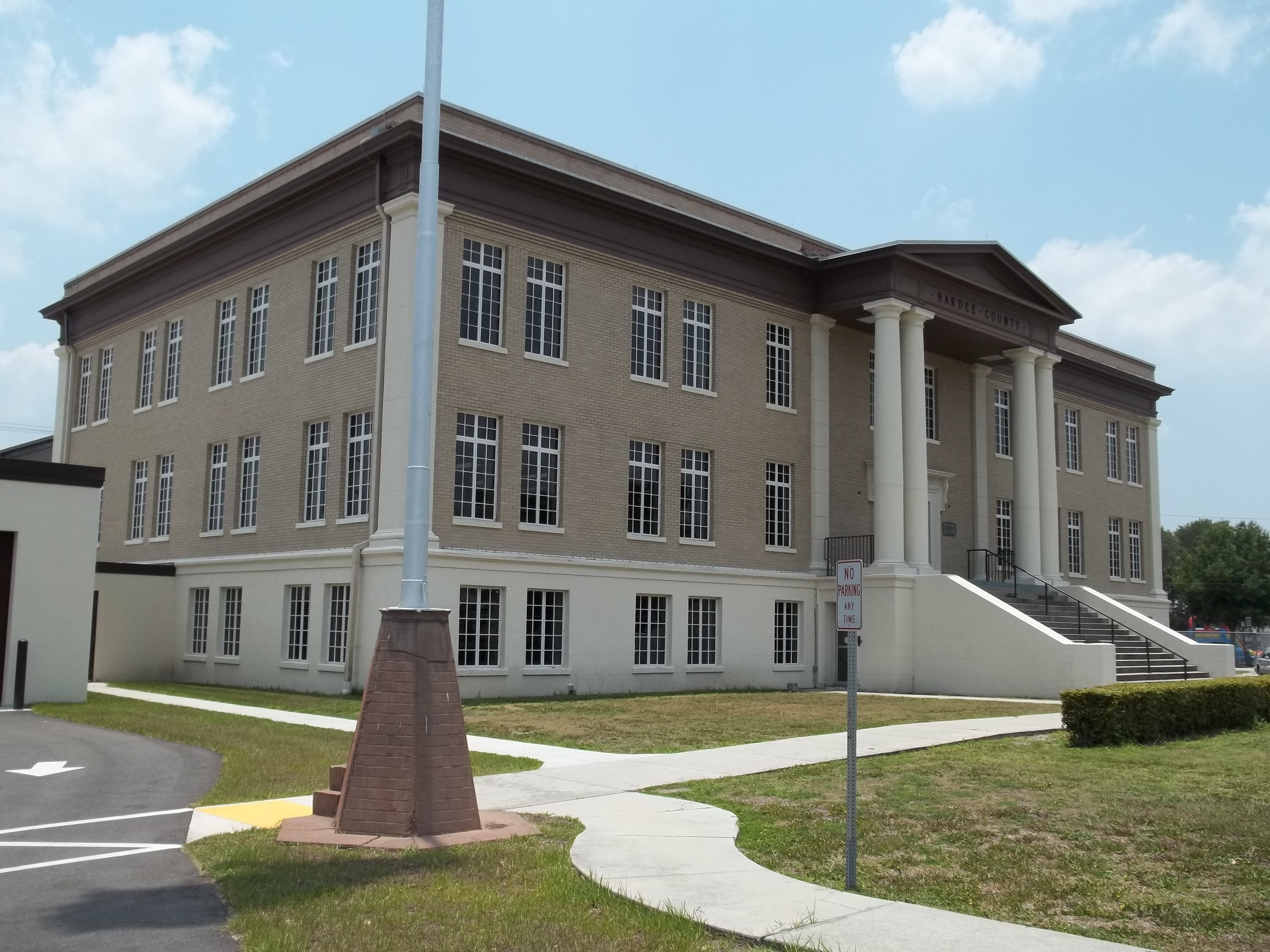
- Hardee County Courthouse

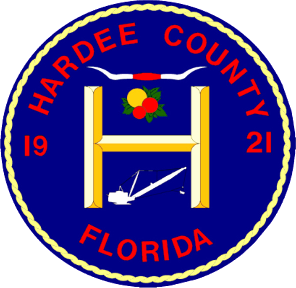
- Seal

- Location within the U.S. state of Florida
- Coordinates: 27°29′N 81°49′W
- Country: United States
- State: Florida
- Founded: April 23, 1921
- Named for: Cary A. Hardee
- Seat: Wauchula
- Largest city: Wauchula

Area
  - Total: 638 sq mi (1,650 km^{2})
  - Land: 638 sq mi (1,650 km^{2})
  - Water: 0.6 sq mi (1.6 km^{2}) 0.1%

Population (2020)
  - Total: 25,327
  - Estimate (2025): 25,932 ▲
  - Density: 43/sq mi (17/km^{2})
- Time zone: UTC−5 (Eastern)
  - Summer (DST): UTC−4 (EDT)
- Congressional district: 18th
- Website: www.hardeecountyfl.gov

Hardee County is a county located in the Florida Heartland of the Central Florida region in the U.S. state of Florida. As of the 2020 census, the population was 25,327. Its county seat is Wauchula. Hardee County comprises the Wauchula, Florida, Micropolitan Statistical Area.

== History ==
Hardee County was created by an act of April 23, 1921 in which the Florida Legislature divided "old DeSoto County" into five parts, forming the Counties of Hardee, DeSoto, Charlotte, Highlands and Glades.

The county is named after Cary A. Hardee, the Governor of Florida who served from 1921 to 1925 and who signed the act creating the county.

The settlement of what is now Hardee County, Florida, began with the establishment of the Kennedy–Darling Indian-trading post on Paynes Creek in April 1849. The enterprise came to an end on July 17, 1849, when two of the clerks, George Payne and Dempsey Whidden, were killed by Indians. A third clerk, William McCullough, and his wife Nancy were also wounded, and the post was burned down.

Reports of the attack motivated the U.S. Army to establish a chain of fortifications across Florida, and construction began on Fort Chokonikla on October 26, 1849. The fort was subsequently abandoned in July 1850 due to an outbreak of sickness and never reoccupied.

During the Seminole Wars, Fort Green and Fort Hartsuff were both garrisoned in the area. Fort Hartstuff would later become the settlement and county seat of Wauchula.

The Florida Southern Railway arrived in 1886 and ushered in a new era of increased settlement for what is now Hardee County, with many new settlers finding employment working with the railroad, tending stores, farming, ranching and teaching.

At the dawn of the 20th century, the county seat Wauchula was incorporated in 1902, and the first bank was opened in 1904.

A community group of activists referred to as "Divisionists" first began lobbying for the creation of new counties with the area of "old DeSoto County" in 1907, and after a 15-year campaign, the Florida Legislature separated Desoto into five parts, creating the 638-square mile Hardee County.

On August 13, 2004, Hurricane Charley went directly through Hardee County. Maximum sustained winds in downtown Wauchula were clocked at 149 mph (240 km/h) with higher gusts. Most buildings in the county sustained damage, and many were totally destroyed.

== Geography ==
According to the U.S. Census Bureau, the county has a total area of 638 square miles (1,650 km^{2}), of which 638 square miles (1,650 km^{2}) is land and 0.6 square miles (1.6 km^{2}) (0.1%) is water.

Hardee County is located in a region colloquially referred to as "Bone Valley." The region contains most of North America's phosphate deposits and a large portion of the world's accessible deposits. CommercialPhosphate mining in the region that is now the county has been ongoing since the late 19th century.

The Mosaic Company currently operates the only mines in the county with around 10,000 acres near Fort Green and 16,778 acres near Ona, FL.

There is controversy over the mining practice and the rezoning and conversion of agricultural land into open pit mines. Land is reclaimed after mining and leaves artificially-created lakes and wetlands.

Reclamation standards for phosphate lands include contouring to safe slopes, providing for acceptable water quality and quantity, revegetation, and the return of wetlands to pre-mining type, nature, function and acreage.

Opponents of mining say converting agricultural land to phosphate mining is harmful to the environment, increasing background radiation levels, harming water quality and rendering some areas poorly suited for agriculture.

Supporters of mining say it is critical to America's food supply and economy, and that reclaimed mine land is better for the environment than agricultural land.

=== Adjacent counties ===
- Polk County, Florida - north
- Highlands County, Florida - east
- DeSoto County, Florida - south
- Manatee County, Florida - west
- Hillsborough County, Florida - northwest

== Demographics ==
Historical population
Census	Pop.	Note	%±
1930	10,348		—
1940	10,158		−1.8%
1950	10,073		−0.8%
1960	12,370		22.8%
1970	14,889		20.4%
1980	19,379		30.2%
1990	19,499		0.6%
2000	26,938		38.2%
2010	27,731		2.9%
2020	25,327		−8.7%
2025 (est.)	25,932	▲	2.4%
U.S. Decennial Census; 1790-1960 1900-1990; 1990-2000 2010-2019

=== Racial and ethnic composition ===
Hardee County, Florida – Racial and ethnic composition Note: the US Census treats Hispanic/Latino as an ethnic category. This table excludes Latinos from the racial categories and assigns them to a separate category. Hispanics/Latinos may be of any race.
Race / Ethnicity (NH = Non-Hispanic)	Pop 1980	Pop 1990	Pop 2000	Pop 2010	Pop 2020	% 1980	% 1990	% 2000	% 2010	% 2020
White alone (NH)	14,467	13,804	14,704	13,315	11,873	74.65%	70.79%	54.58%	48.01%	46.88%
Black or African American alone (NH)	1,586	1,008	2,165	1,877	2,111	8.18%	5.17%	8.04%	6.77%	8.33%
Native American or Alaska Native alone (NH)	46	68	98	91	55	0.24%	0.35%	0.36%	0.33%	0.22%
Asian alone (NH)	28	34	71	294	165	0.14%	0.17%	0.26%	1.06%	0.65%
Native Hawaiian or Pacific Islander alone (NH)	x	x	11	8	3	x	x	0.04%	0.03%	0.01%
Other race alone (NH)	16	23	21	6	35	0.08%	0.12%	0.08%	0.02%	0.14%
Mixed race or Multiracial (NH)	x	x	257	245	481	x	x	0.95%	0.88%	1.90%
Hispanic or Latino (any race)	3,236	4,562	9,611	11,895	10,604	16.70%	23.40%	35.68%	42.89%	41.87%
Total	19,379	19,499	26,938	27,731	25,327	100.00%	100.00%	100.00%	100.00%	100.00%

A map of racial demographics in Hardee County, Florida by Census tract Legend: Non-Hispanic White 40–50% 50–60% >90% Hispanic 50–60%

=== 2020 census ===
As of the 2020 census, the county had a population of 25,327. The median age was 37.4 years. 25.6% of residents were under the age of 18 and 16.9% of residents were 65 years of age or older. For every 100 females there were 115.1 males, and for every 100 females age 18 and over there were 117.8 males age 18 and over.

The racial makeup of the county was 58.5% White, 8.6% Black or African American, 0.7% American Indian and Alaska Native, 0.7% Asian, <0.1% Native Hawaiian and Pacific Islander, 14.2% from some other race, and 17.2% from two or more races. Hispanic or Latino residents of any race comprised 41.9% of the population.

38.7% of residents lived in urban areas, while 61.3% lived in rural areas.

There were 8,059 households in the county, of which 37.4% had children under the age of 18 living in them. Of all households, 49.5% were married-couple households, 18.7% were households with a male householder and no spouse or partner present, and 25.0% were households with a female householder and no spouse or partner present. About 22.0% of all households were made up of individuals and 11.8% had someone living alone who was 65 years of age or older.

There were 9,820 housing units, of which 17.9% were vacant. Among occupied housing units, 68.9% were owner-occupied and 31.1% were renter-occupied. The homeowner vacancy rate was 1.5% and the rental vacancy rate was 11.4%.

=== 2000 census ===
As of the census of 2000, there were 26,938 people, 8,166 households, and 6,255 families residing in the county. The population density was 42 inhabitants per square mile (16/km^{2}). There were 9,820 housing units at an average density of 15 per square mile (5.8/km^{2}). The racial makeup of the county was 70.66% White, 8.33% Black or African American, 0.68% Native American, 0.30% Asian, 0.06% Pacific Islander, 17.99% from other races, and 1.97% from two or more races. 35.68% of the population were Hispanic or Latino of any race.

According to 2005 Census Estimates the county's population was 50.6% non-Hispanic white, 39.8% Latino, 9.0% African-American and 1.3% Native American.

In 2000 there were 8,166 households, out of which 34.90% had children under the age of 18 living with them, 60.00% were married couples living together, 11.10% had a female householder with no husband present, and 23.40% were non-families. 18.00% of all households were made up of individuals, and 9.40% had someone living alone who was 65 years of age or older. The average household size was 3.06 and the average family size was 3.40.

In the county, the population was spread out, with 27.60% under the age of 18, 11.00% from 18 to 24, 28.30% from 25 to 44, 19.20% from 45 to 64, and 13.90% who were 65 years of age or older. The median age was 33 years. For every 100 females, there were 119.10 males. For every 100 females age 18 and over, there were 123.00 males.

The median income for a household in the county was $30,183, and the median income for a family was $32,487. Males had a median income of $23,793 versus $18,823 for females. The per capita income for the county was $12,445. About 17.00% of families and 24.60% of the population were below the poverty line, including 30.20% of those under age 18 and 16.10% of those age 65 or over.

== Politics ==
United States presidential election results for Hardee County, Florida
Year	Republican		Democratic		Third party(ies)	
Year	No.	%	No.	%	No.	%
1924	264	22.66%	795	68.24%	106	9.10%
1928	2,087	70.06%	826	27.73%	66	2.22%
1932	566	18.55%	2,485	81.45%	0	0.00%
1936	844	28.27%	2,142	71.73%	0	0.00%
1940	694	21.33%	2,559	78.67%	0	0.00%
1944	708	24.72%	2,156	75.28%	0	0.00%
1948	689	24.12%	1,871	65.49%	297	10.40%
1952	1,802	46.55%	2,069	53.45%	0	0.00%
1956	1,589	45.67%	1,890	54.33%	0	0.00%
1960	1,960	52.96%	1,741	47.04%	0	0.00%
1964	2,321	54.88%	1,908	45.12%	0	0.00%
1968	1,278	28.34%	703	15.59%	2,529	56.08%
1972	3,563	84.57%	647	15.36%	3	0.07%
1976	2,189	42.86%	2,670	52.28%	248	4.86%
1980	2,603	48.82%	2,599	48.74%	130	2.44%
1984	3,962	72.06%	1,536	27.94%	0	0.00%
1988	3,640	66.96%	1,688	31.05%	108	1.99%
1992	2,900	45.08%	2,018	31.37%	1,515	23.55%
1996	2,928	47.18%	2,417	38.95%	861	13.87%
2000	3,765	60.38%	2,342	37.56%	129	2.07%
2004	5,049	69.65%	2,149	29.65%	51	0.70%
2008	4,763	64.00%	2,568	34.51%	111	1.49%
2012	4,696	64.83%	2,463	34.00%	85	1.17%
2016	5,242	68.57%	2,149	28.11%	254	3.32%
2020	6,122	72.01%	2,298	27.03%	82	0.96%
2024	6,336	77.65%	1,751	21.46%	73	0.89%

== Libraries ==
Hardee County is part of the Heartland Library Cooperative which serves Hardee County and some of the surrounding counties, including Glades, Highlands, Okeechobee, and DeSoto. The seven-branch library system has one branch in Wauchula. Hardee County Public Library and the Heartland Library Cooperative are also members of the Tampa Bay Library Consortium.

Hardee County Public Library was established in the mid-1980s after a group of residents expressed concern that the current small local library was not enough for the growing county. In September 1984 the Board of County Commissioners adopted the Resolution 84-21 that allowed the creation of the Hardee County Public Library. Later in 1997, the Board of County Commissioners signed an inter-local agreement to become a member of the Heartland Library Cooperative. Becoming a member of the Heartland Library Cooperative allows the library more resources and materials for its members. In the summer of 2004, the library building was severely damaged by Hurricane Charley and managed to keep its doors open for a couple of years before ultimately closing in 2006 for much-needed repairs. The library reopened its doors in January 2007. The library went from 5,800 square feet in 1984 to 15,680 square feet in 2007. It circulates an average of 71,251 items per year to 27,652 residents.

In addition to traditional materials and online resources, the Hardee County Public Library contains archives from the Florida Advocate and Herald-Advocate (local newspapers) on microfilm as well as Wauchula City Directories from the 1970s-to 1980s. A library card is free for people who reside in Hardee County and other participating counties in the Heartland Library Cooperative.

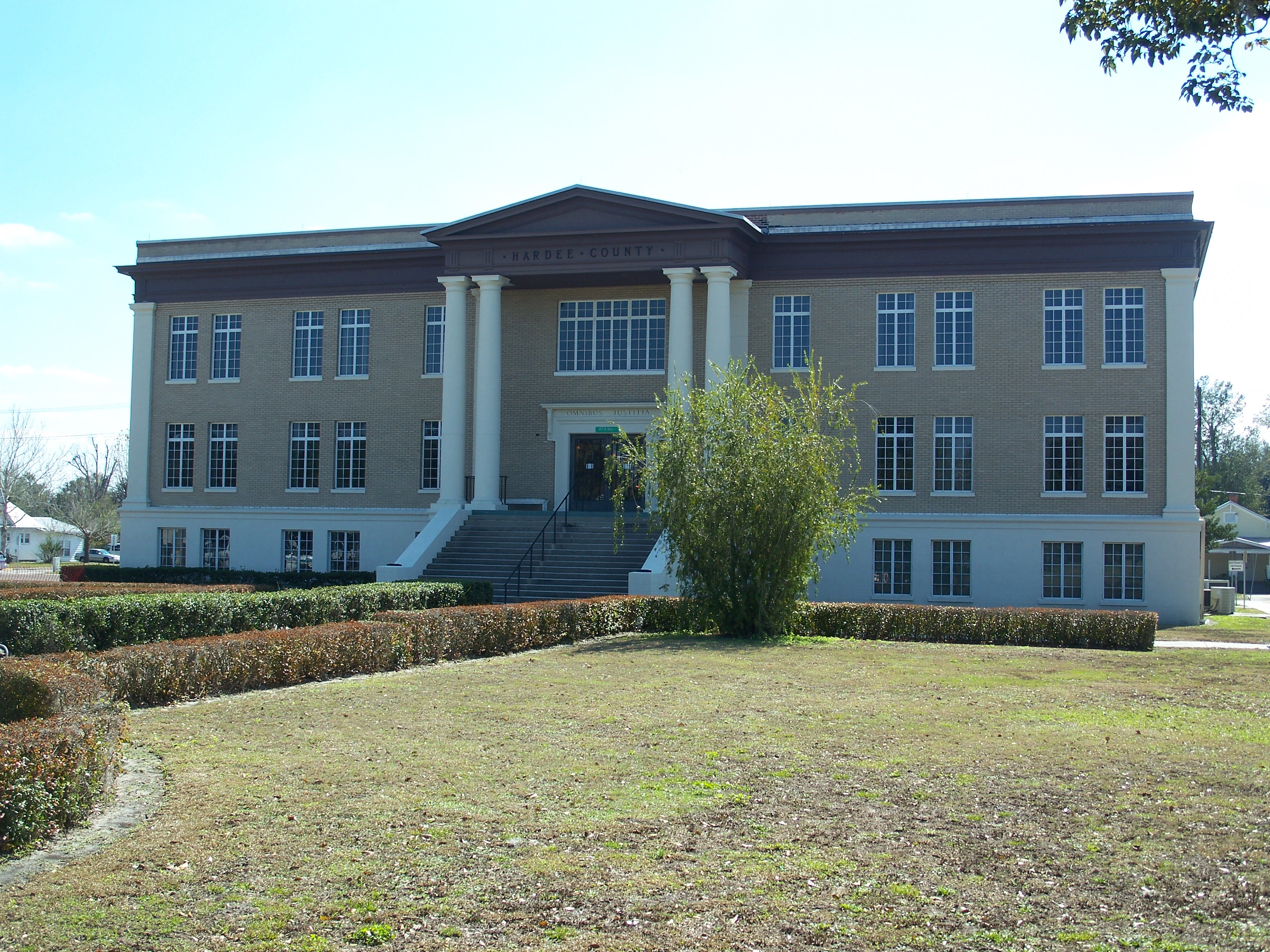
Hardee County Courthouse

=== Cities ===
- Bowling Green
- Wauchula

=== Town ===
- Zolfo Springs

=== Census-designated places ===
- Fort Green
- Fort Green Springs
- Gardner
- Lemon Grove
- Limestone
- Ona

=== Other unincorporated communities ===
- Crewsville
- Lake Dale
- Oak Grove
- Popash
- Sweetwater Ranch
- Village of Charlie Creek

== Transportation ==
=== Airports ===
- Wauchula Municipal Airport

=== Major highways ===
- U.S. Route 17
- State Road 62
- State Road 64
- State Road 66
- State Road 636

== Government and infrastructure ==
Hardee Correctional Institution is in an unincorporated area in the county.

== Education ==
The Hardee County School District is the sole school district of the county. Its education system consists of nine schools that serve approximately 5,300 students. The district has five elementary schools, one junior high school, one high school, one alternative school, and one adult/community school.

Hardee High School and Hardee Junior High are situated in Wauchula, while the preschools and elementary schools are located in Bowling Green, Hilltop, North Wauchula, Wauchula, and Zolfo Springs.

The District is diverse, with a minority enrollment of 70%, 47.9% of whom come from economically disadvantaged backgrounds. The high school graduation rate in the county (91%) is above the state average of 87.3%.

South Florida State College is a public college serving Hardee, Highlands and DeSoto Counties. Its Hardee campus is in Bowling Green.

== See also ==
- Florida Heartland
- National Register of Historic Places listings in Hardee County, Florida
