= Zolfo Springs, Florida =

Town in the state of Florida, United States

- Town
- Town of Zolfo Springs
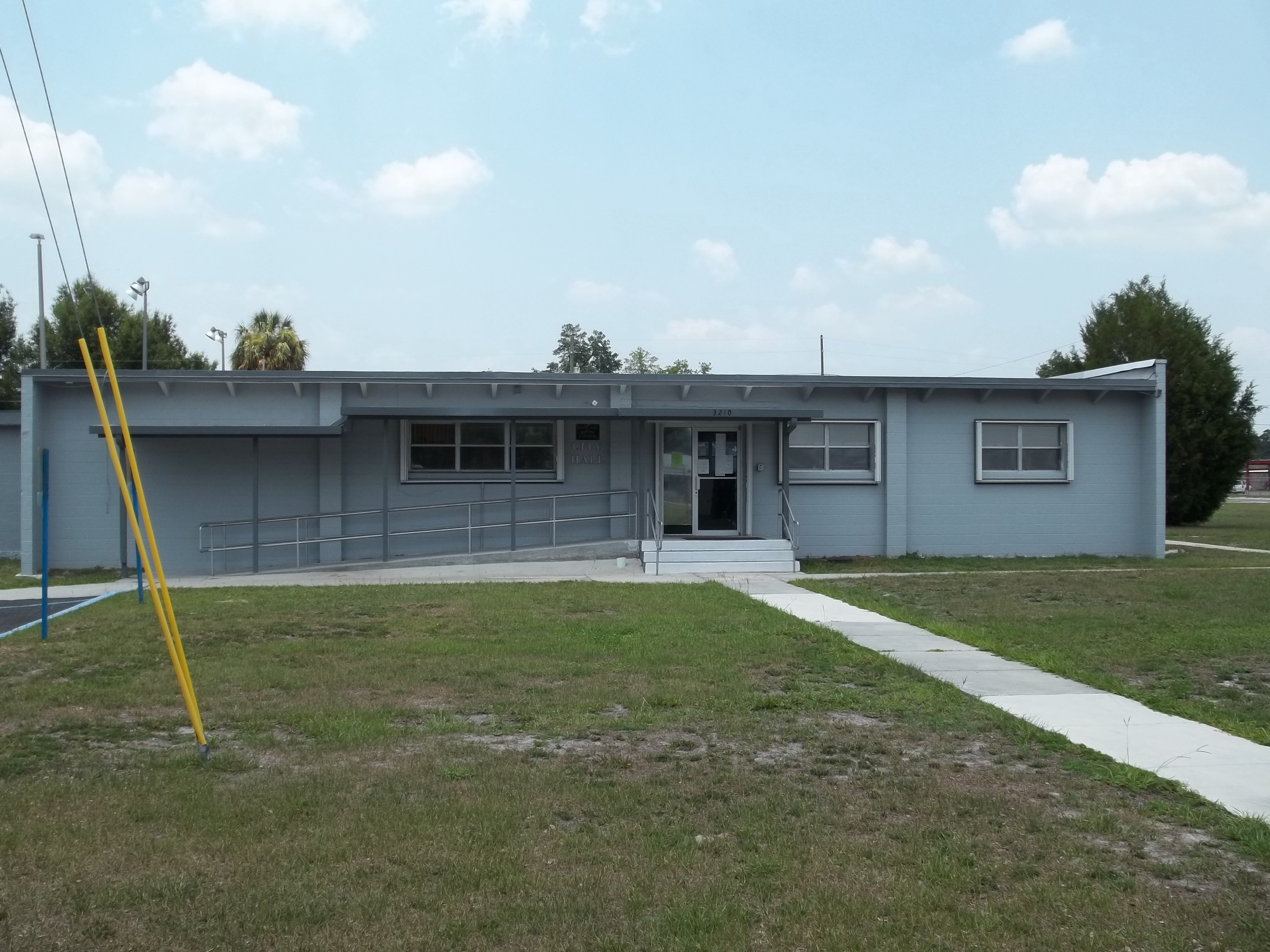
- Zolfo Springs Town Hall

- Seal

- Location in Hardee County and the state of Florida
- Coordinates: 27°29′46″N 81°47′49″W
- Country: United States
- State: Florida
- County: Hardee
- Settled (Zolfo): c. 1877–1886
- Incorporated (Town of Zolfo): October 18, 1904
- Incorporated (Town of Zolfo Springs): September 13, 1909

Government
  - Type: Commission–Manager
  - Mayor: Rodney "Rod" A. Cannon
  - Vice Mayor: Martina O. Zuniga
  - Commissioners: Dierdre "Didi" White, Sara Ann Schofield, and Howard "Mike" E. Schofield
  - Town Manager: Linda Roberson
  - Town Clerk: Susan Williamson

Area
  - Total: 1.74 sq mi (4.50 km^{2})
  - Land: 1.74 sq mi (4.50 km^{2})
  - Water: 0 sq mi (0.00 km^{2})
- Elevation: 62 ft (19 m)

Population (2020)
  - Total: 1,737
  - Density: 999/sq mi (385.6/km^{2})
- Time zone: UTC-5 (Eastern (EST))
  - Summer (DST): UTC-4 (EDT)
- ZIP code: 33890
- Area code: 863
- FIPS code: 12-79250
- GNIS feature ID: 2406930
- Website: www.townofzolfo.com

Zolfo Springs is a town in Hardee County, Florida, United States. It is part of the Florida Heartland region. The population was 1,737 at the 2020 census.

== Etymology ==
The name of the town got its name in the early 1800s, when a crew of miners from Spain and Italy looking for phosphate were sailing along the Peace River and came upon the spring, noting it had a strong sulfuric smell. Because of this, the Italians decided to call the area "zolfo", which means "sulfur" in the Italian language.

== History ==
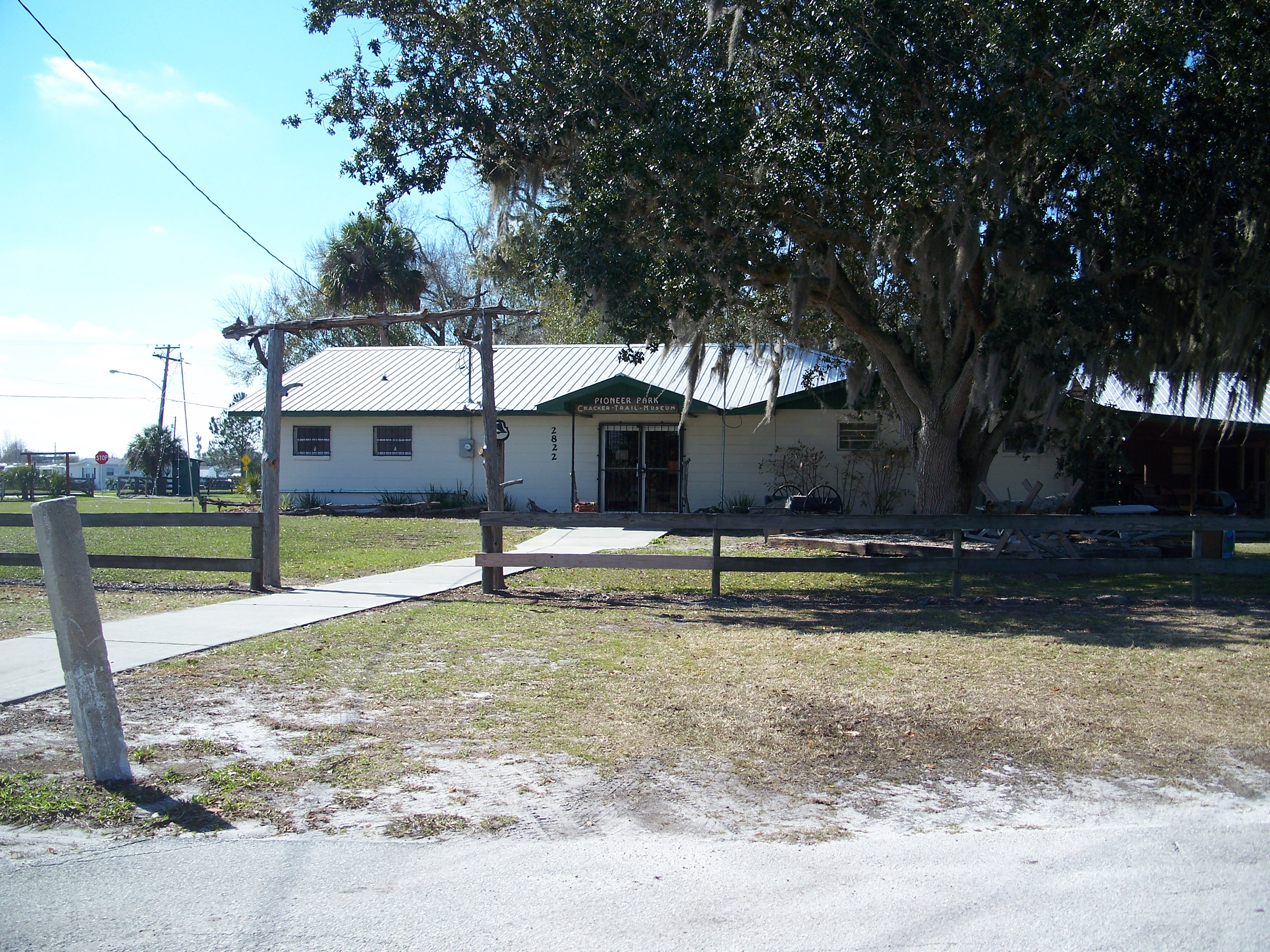
Zolfo Springs Pioneer Park Museum

Early prosperity in the area (where the settlement was known as "Zolfo") was due to its location along the Florida Cracker Trail, a cattle trail from Bradenton to Fort Pierce. Cattle herded from this area and the Florida Heartland was run to the coasts along this route as early as 1850. The Florida Cracker Trail today includes parts of State Road 64 and State Road 66 through Zolfo Springs.

In 1886, transportation improved through Zolfo when the Florida Southern Railway (which later became the Atlantic Coast Line Railroad) was built through the town on its way from Bartow to Punta Gorda. The railroad built a depot in the town and a post office was established the same year. The railroad was removed in the early 1980s. Today US 17 runs along the former railroad right of way (with Main Street being the original alignment of US 17).

It was officially incorporated as a municipality on October 18, 1904, as the "Town of Zolfo", and was officially renamed a few years later as the "Town of Zolfo Springs", on September 13, 1909.

== Geography ==
The Town of Zolfo Springs is located at the geographic center of Hardee County in the Florida Heartland.

U.S. Route 17 runs through the center of town, leading north 4 miles (6 km) to Wauchula, the county seat, and south 20 miles (32 km) to Arcadia. Florida State Road 64 crosses the northern side of town, leading northeast 18 miles (29 km) to Avon Park and west 50 miles (80 km) to Bradenton. SR 66 leaves US 17 at the center of Zolfo Springs and leads east 25 miles (40 km) to U.S. Route 27 at the south end of Sebring.

According to the United States Census Bureau, Zolfo Springs has a total area of 1.7 square miles (4.5 km^{2}), all of it land.

The Peace River, which flows south to Punta Gorda, forms part of the northern town boundary. Pioneer Park Lake and Pioneer Park are also inside the town's boundaries.

=== Climate ===
The climate in this area is characterized by hot, humid summers and generally mild winters. According to the Köppen climate classification, the Town of Zolfo Springs has a humid subtropical climate zone (Cfa).

== Demographics ==
Historical population
Census	Pop.	Note	%±
1910	171		—
1920	256		49.7%
1930	272		6.3%
1940	223		−18.0%
1950	334		49.8%
1960	838		150.9%
1970	1,117		33.3%
1980	1,495		33.8%
1990	1,219		−18.5%
2000	1,641		34.6%
2010	1,827		11.3%
2020	1,737		−4.9%
U.S. Decennial Census

=== Racial and ethnic composition ===
Zolfo Springs racial composition (Hispanics excluded from racial categories) (NH = Non-Hispanic)
Race	Pop 2010	Pop 2020	% 2010	% 2020
White (NH)	547	498	29.94%	28.67%
Black or African American (NH)	74	51	4.05%	2.94%
Native American or Alaska Native (NH)	2	5	0.11%	0.29%
Asian (NH)	11	8	0.60%	0.46%
Pacific Islander or Native Hawaiian (NH)	4	0	0.22%	0.00%
Some other race (NH)	0	1	0.00%	0.06%
Two or more races/Multiracial (NH)	12	39	0.66%	2.25%
Hispanic or Latino (any race)	1,177	1,135	64.42%	65.34%
Total	1,827	1,737		

=== 2020 census ===
As of the 2020 census, Zolfo Springs had a population of 1,737. The median age was 31.4 years. 31.2% of residents were under the age of 18 and 12.8% of residents were 65 years of age or older. For every 100 females there were 109.8 males, and for every 100 females age 18 and over there were 104.6 males age 18 and over.

90.6% of residents lived in urban areas, while 9.4% lived in rural areas.

There were 543 households in Zolfo Springs, of which 46.8% had children under the age of 18 living in them. Of all households, 45.9% were married-couple households, 21.2% were households with a male householder and no spouse or partner present, and 23.2% were households with a female householder and no spouse or partner present. About 19.3% of all households were made up of individuals and 9.6% had someone living alone who was 65 years of age or older.

There were 678 housing units, of which 19.9% were vacant. The homeowner vacancy rate was 1.9% and the rental vacancy rate was 8.2%.

According to the 2020 American Community Survey 5-year estimates, there were 513 families residing in the town.

=== 2010 census ===
As of the 2010 United States census, there were 1,827 people, 648 households, and 552 families residing in the town.

=== 2000 census ===
As of the census of 2000, there were 1,641 people, 497 households, and 399 families residing in the town. The population density was 1,086.5 inhabitants per square mile (419.5/km^{2}). There were 634 housing units at an average density of 419.8 per square mile (162.1/km^{2}). The racial makeup of the town was 65.69% White, 3.35% African American, 0.18% Native American, 0.12% Asian, 0.12% Pacific Islander, 29.07% from other races, and 1.46% from two or more races. Hispanic or Latino of any race were 53.63% of the population.

In 2000, there were 497 households, out of which 39.4% had children under the age of 18 living with them, 60.2% were married couples living together, 15.1% had a female householder with no husband present, and 19.7% were non-families. 14.9% of all households were made up of individuals, and 9.5% had someone living alone who was 65 years of age or older. The average household size was 3.26 and the average family size was 3.55.

In 2000, in the town, the population was spread out, with 32.3% under the age of 18, 11.2% from 18 to 24, 25.3% from 25 to 44, 16.4% from 45 to 64, and 14.9% who were 65 years of age or older. The median age was 30 years. For every 100 females, there were 102.3 males. For every 100 females age 18 and over, there were 100.2 males.

In 2000, the median income for a household in the town was $25,972, and the median income for a family was $27,188. Males had a median income of $18,603 versus $17,292 for females. The per capita income for the town was $11,397. About 18.7% of families and 27.3% of the population were below the poverty line, including 33.2% of those under age 18 and 18.9% of those age 65 or over.

== Media ==
- WZZS-FM (106.9 The Bull)
- WZSP-FM (105.3 La Zeta)
