= Stovall =

Stovall may refer to:

== Places ==
- Stovall, Georgia
- Stovall, Mississippi
- Stovall, North Carolina, a town in North Carolina
- Stovall Drive, in Clovis, California
- Stovall House, historic home in Tampa, Florida
- Stovall's Inn, a Best Western hotel across the street from Disneyland in Anaheim, California
- Stovall Middle School, middle school in Houston, Texas
- Stovall Mill Covered Bridge, smallest covered bridge in the U.S. state of Georgia
- The Stovall, a high rise in Tampa, Florida
- 24010 Stovall, an asteroid

== People sharing the surname "Stovall" ==
- Anthony Stovall (born 1982), American professional soccer player
- Babe Stovall (1907–1974), American blues musician
- Carla Stovall (born 1957), Attorney General of Kansas 1995–2003
- Dale E. Stovall (born 1944), USAF Brigadier General
- Di Stovall (born 1947), American artist
- Dick Stovall (1922–1999), NFL football player
- Don Stovall (1913–1970), American jazz saxophonist
- Fred Stovall (1882–1958), oilman and baseball club owner
- George Stovall (1877–1951), American baseball player, manager of the Cleveland Naps, and player/manager of St. Louis Browns
- Gil Stovall (born 1986), American Olympic swimmer
- J. Willis Stovall (1891–1953), American paleontologist, who co-named Acrocanthosaurus
- Jack Stovall, football coach for Central Connecticut State University
- Jerry Stovall (born 1941), professional football player and coach at LSU
- Jesse Stovall (1875–1955), professional baseball player
- Jim Stovall, blind author and advocate
- Kate Bradley Stovall (1884–1914), American writer, clubwoman
- Lloyd Stovall, football coach for Southeastern Louisiana University
- Marcellus A. Stovall (1818–1895), American soldier and Confederate general
- Maurice Stovall (born 1985), American football player
- Paul Stovall (1948–1978), American professional basketball player
- Peter Simpson Stovall, State Treasurer of Mississippi (1912–1916)
- Queena Stovall (1888–1980), West Virginia folk artist known as the Grandma Moses of West Virginia
- Rawson Stovall (born 1972), video game producer
- The Stovall Sisters, a gospel trio, sisters Lillian, Joyce and Netta Stovall, members of the Blues Hall of Fame
- Thelma Stovall (1919–1994), Lieutenant Governor of Kentucky (1975–1979)
- Tyler Stovall (1954–2021), American historian and academic
- Wallace Stovall, publisher of The Tampa Tribune
- Welmon Sharlhorne, also known as Welman Stovall (born 1952), African-American painter
- William H. Stovall, a World War I flying ace

== Fictional characters ==
- Lt. Stovall, character in the 1959 film Operation Petticoat
- Major Harvey Stovall, character in Twelve O'Clock High, a novel (1948), film (1949) and television series (1964-67)
- Red Stovall, character played by Clint Eastwood in the 1982 film Honkytonk Man
- Dewey Stovall character, played by Paul Brinegar, in the 1979-1980's TV Show "Dukes of Hazzard"
- Victor Stovall is a character in MN Seeley's 2020 novel, "Cur Dogs."
