= B. Clayton Bonfoey =

American architect

Bayard Clayton Bonfoey (February 27, 1872, Higganum, Connecticut – February 18, 1953, Pinellas, Florida) was an architect known for his work in Tampa. On September 2, 1907, Bonfey formed Bonfoey and Elliott with Malachi Leo Elliott. The firm is credited with designing Tampa City Hall, Kenilworth Lodge, DeSoto County Courthouse and the Centro Asturiano (1914) at 1913 Nebraska Avenue. The partnership ended with the advent of World War I, but their Rivoli Theater was finished in 1917 .

The Wilsonian Apartment Building in Lakeland, Florida was finished in 1922.

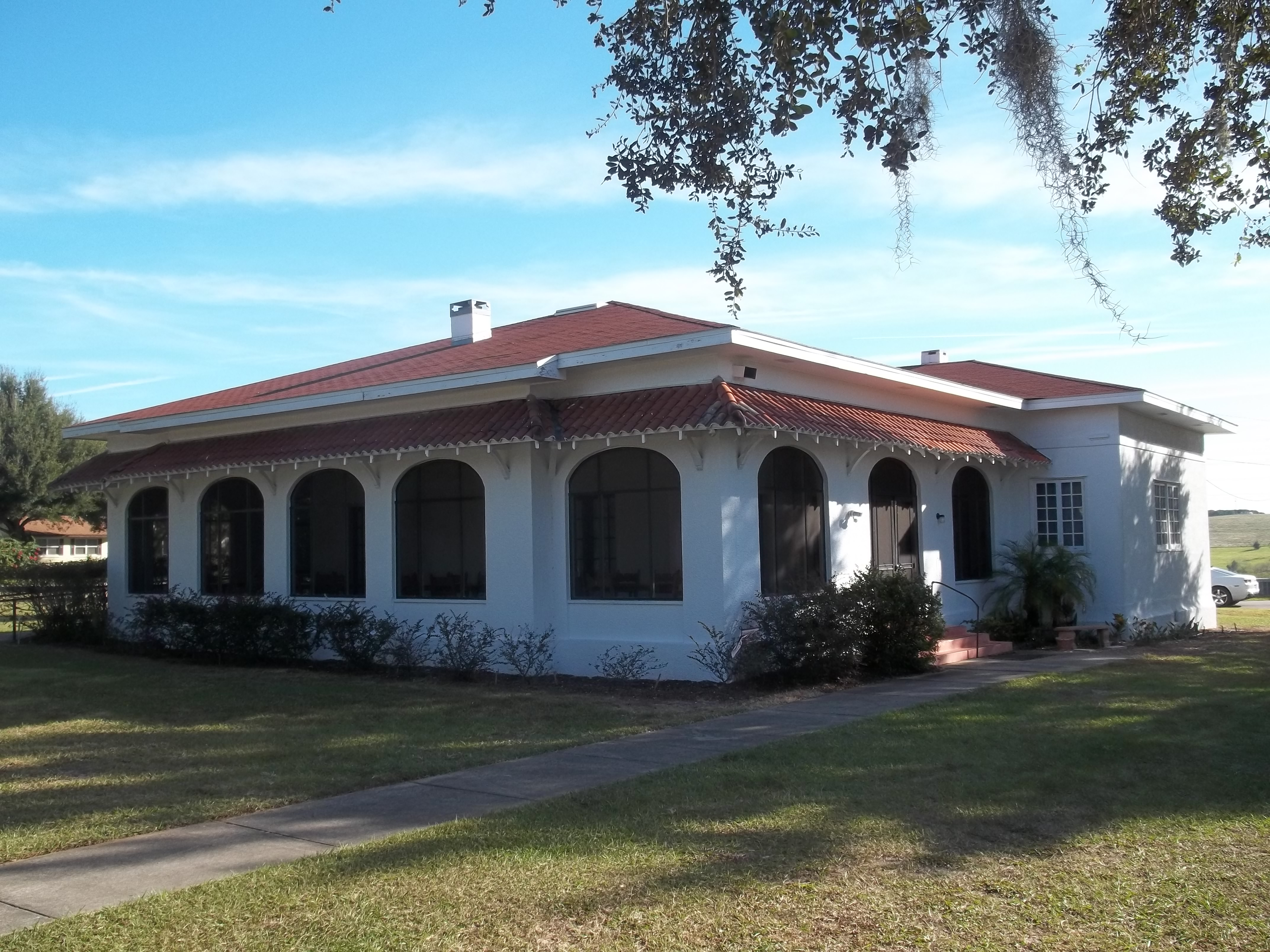
Lake Hamilton Woman's Club

Bonfoey designed the Lake Hamilton Woman's Club building, constructed in 1924.

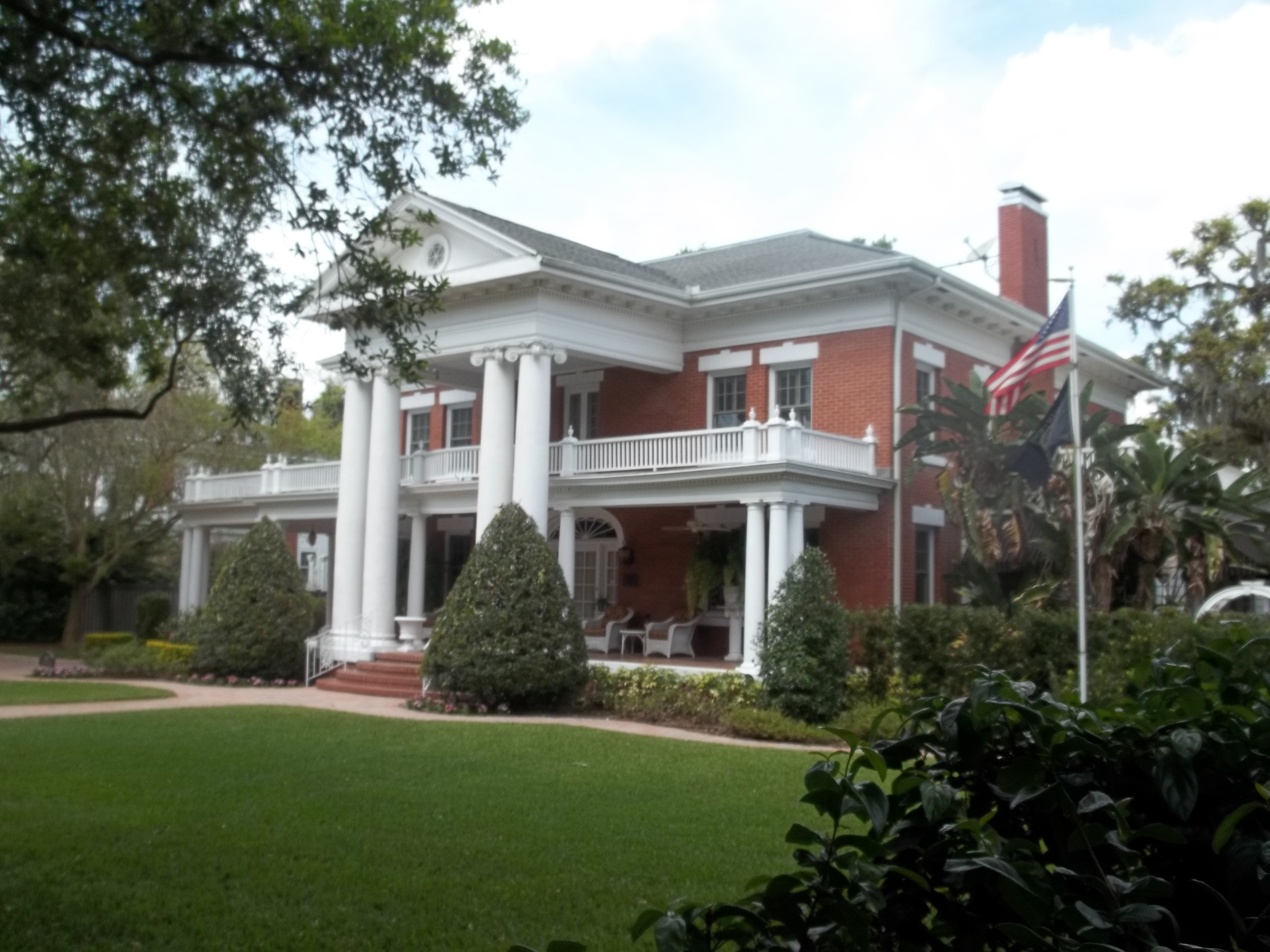
John J. Swearingen House

He designed the John J. Swearingen House in 1923, described as an excellent example of the Colonial Revival.

He constructed for himself 'Casa Bonfeoey', finished in 1925.

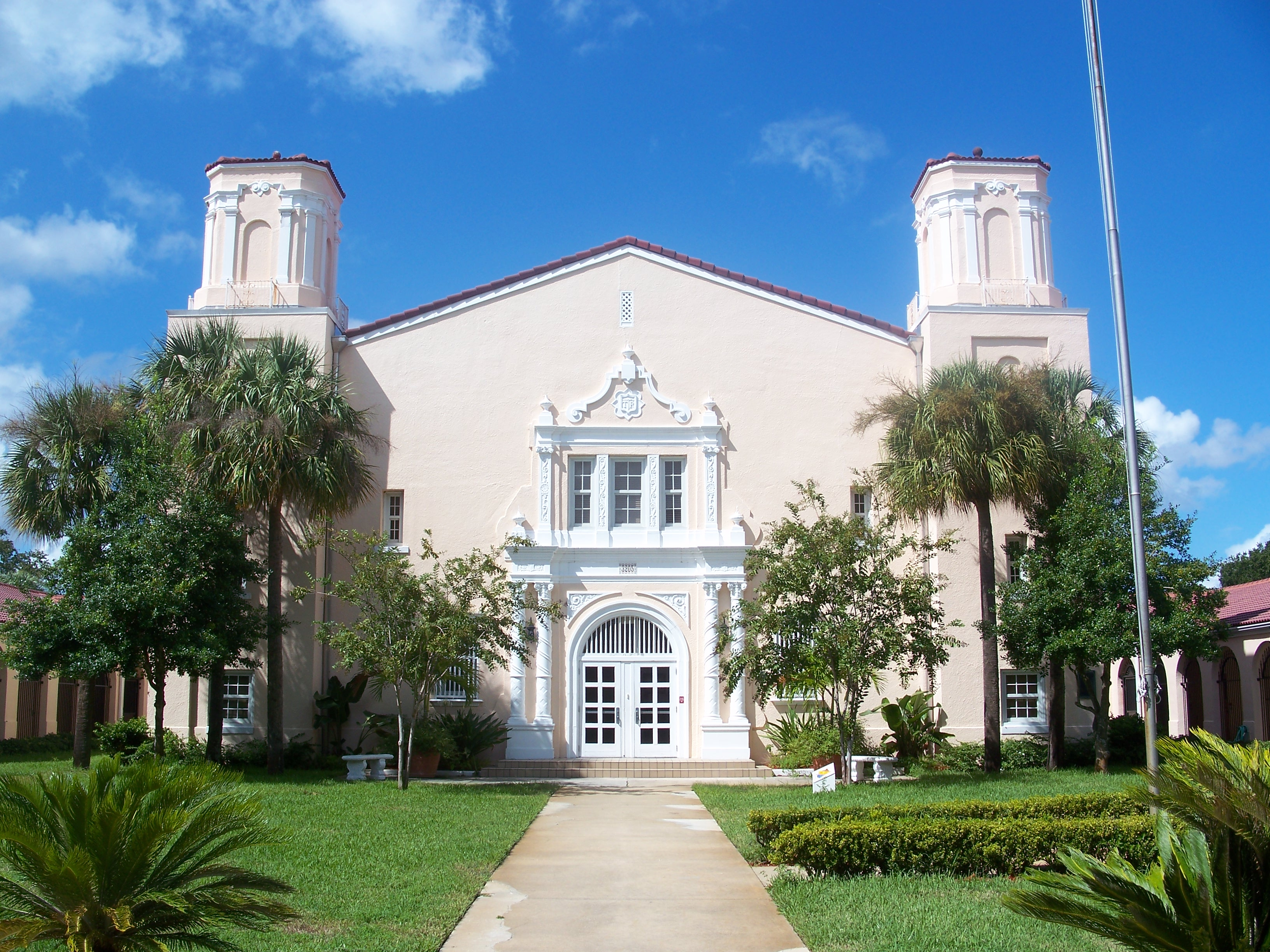
Roosevelt Elementary School

Roosevelt Elementary School was constructed in Mediterranean Revival style in 1925.

Bonfoey designed Wallace Stovall building constructed in 1926.

He designed the Postal Arcade in Winter Haven, Florida, finished in 1927.

Bonfoey was a member of the first board of NCARB, Florida.

Bonfoey is buried at Myrtle Hill Memorial Park in Tampa. He was a Cpl Co F 1 Conn Inf SAW.
