= Malachi Leo Elliott =

American architect

- Born: April 4, 1886; Woodstock, New York
- Died: August 18, 1967 (aged 81); Tampa, Florida
- Resting place: Myrtle Hill Memorial Park, Tampa, Florida; 27.982264°N 82.402440°W
- Education: Cooper Union
- Occupation: Architect

M. Leo Elliott (April 4, 1886 – August 18, 1967) was an architect known for his work in Tampa, Temple Terrace and Sarasota, Florida. His designs include the public buildings and first eight houses in the City of Temple Terrace, Florida (1921), Ybor City's Centro Asturiano de Tampa, Old Tampa City Hall, Osprey School, two buildings that were part of Florida College and the original Temple Terrace Estates, Masonic Temple No. 25 (1928), the original 1926 Sarasota High School (with T. A. Monk) and Historic Spanish Point. Several of the properties are listed on the National Register of Historic Places.

Elliott designed Grand Central Place, now home to Mise En Place. The Tampa Gas Co. (1931) building was also designed by Elliott, but was lost after a fight for preservation failed. He also designed the Leiman-Wilson house. Elliott is widely regarded as one of the finest architects in Tampa's history.

Elliott was born in New York's Catskill Mountains in 1886. He came to Tampa from Woodstock, New York. He married Beth Thompson, daughter of N.O. and Mary Coe Thompson. They had two children: Shelia and M. Leo Jr.

Elliott won first place in design competitions for the Centro Asturiano Club and Tampa YMCA building. On September 2, 1907, Elliott formed Bonfoey and Elliott with B. Clayton Bonfoey. The firm is credited with designing Tampa City Hall, Kenilworth Lodge, DeSoto County Courthouse and the Centro Asturiano (1914) at 1913 Nebraska Avenue. The partnership ended with the advent of World War I. Bonfoey is buried at Myrtle Hill Memorial Park in Tampa. He was a Cpl Co F 1 Conn Inf SAW.

Elliott set up his own firm, M. Leo Elliott Inc, in 1920. The firm had offices in Tampa, Sarasota and St. Petersburg, Florida.

== Background ==
Elliott was born in Woodstock, New York, and attended Cooper Union. He trained with Welch, Smith & Provost in New York City and helped design buildings for the Jamestown Exposition of 1907 in Norfolk, Virginia.

He came to Tampa in 1907 and soon had success winning design competitions for buildings including the Centro Asturiano de Tampa. Elliott wrote in his own obituary that he was born April 4, 1886, in the Catskill Mountains of Woodstock, New York, and moved to New York City when he was 15. In the city he worked as an office clerk for an architectural firm. He eventually moved to Norfolk, Virginia where he designed buildings for the Jamestown Exposition. After the expo he moved to Tampa. Elliott retired in 1954 and died in 1967. Granddaughter Lynn Elliott Rydene is an interior designer in Tampa.

== City of Temple Terrace ==
Florida College's Sutton Hall, formerly the Temple Terrace Golf and Country Club, 1920s postcard

In 1922, Elliott designed the original Temple Terrace Country Club building (now part of Florida College's campus known as Sutton Hall), the Florida College Student Center (originally the Club Morocco Nightclub and Casino), Real Estate Office (today the Temple Terrace Community Church), Chauffeurs Lodge and Garage, Greenskeepers House, Caddie Building, Spring House, Temple Terrace Grocery, Temple Terrace Service Station, Entry Tower gates, and the first eight villa residences for the original developers. All were designed in the Mediterranean Revival/Mission/Moorish architectural styles. The Temple Terrace Preservation Society has made efforts to preserve all of these through the creation of a Certified Local Government

The Club Morocco was the hottest nightclub on the west coast of Florida in the 1920s. It was part of the original Temple Terrace Estates, one of the first Mediterranean Revival golf course planned communities in the United States (1921). According to the 1988 Temple Terrace Historic Resources Survey, both buildings are eligible for the National Register of Historic Places. In the 1930s, after the Florida economic collapse of 1926, the property and its buildings were acquired by the Florida Bible Institute from the City of Temple Terrace, and were then sold to the founders of Florida College.

== Work ==
- Tampa City Hall (1915) at 315 John F. Kennedy Blvd (Bonfoey and Elliott) A 3-story building with an 8-story tower. Includes doric columns, balustrade, and terra-cotta detailing. Perhaps the finest of the architect M. Leo Elliott's commercial-municipal structures. National Register listed in 1974.
- Henry Leiman House (1916) Tampa, Florida (Bonfoey & Elliott)
- DeSoto County Courthouse (Florida) (Bonfoey & Elliott)
- Centro Asturiano de Tampa (1914) (Bonfoey & Elliot)
- L'Unione Italiana (Italian Club) (1917), Tampa (Bonfoey & Elliott)
- South Side Elementary at 1901 Webber Street in Sarasota (listed on the National Register
- Tampa YMCA (1909)
- Sutton Hall (originally Temple Terrace Golf and Country Club) (1922)
- Student Center (originally the Club Morocco Nightclub and Casino) (1926)
- Temple Terrace Community Church (formerly the Temple Terrace Estates Real Estate Office) (1922)
- Sarasota High School (1926), leased to the Ringling College of Art and Design for its Sarasota Museum of Art.
- Old Frostproof High School (1926)
- American First National Bank building at 1330 Main Street in Sarasota. The second skyscraper in Sarasota. Added to the National Historic Register in 1998.
- Circulo Cubano de Tampa (Cuban Club)
- Masonic Temple No. 25 (1928) The cornerstone of current building housing Hillsborough Lodge No. 25 Free & Accepted Masons was laid on June 18, 1928, by the Most Worshipful Grand Master of Florida, Cary B. Fish. The Lodge was constructed at its current location in Downtown Tampa, on the corner of East Kennedy Boulevard and Morgan Street. The first Masonic Lodge meeting in the new Temple was called on February 19, 1929. On September 11, 1986, it was added to the U.S. National Register of Historic Places. Brother Malachi Leo Elliot was a member of the Masonic Lodge.
- Wauchula City Hall, auditorium, and fire station on East Main Street in Wauchula, Hardee County, FL.
- Bradenton Bank and Trust Company Building (1926)

== Gallery ==
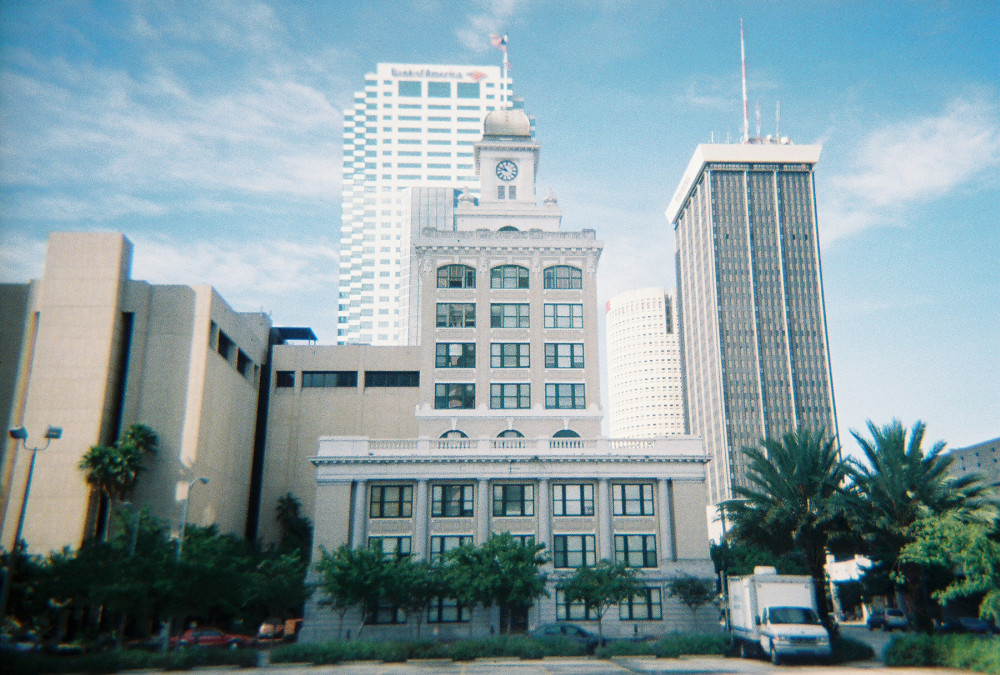
Tampa City Hall

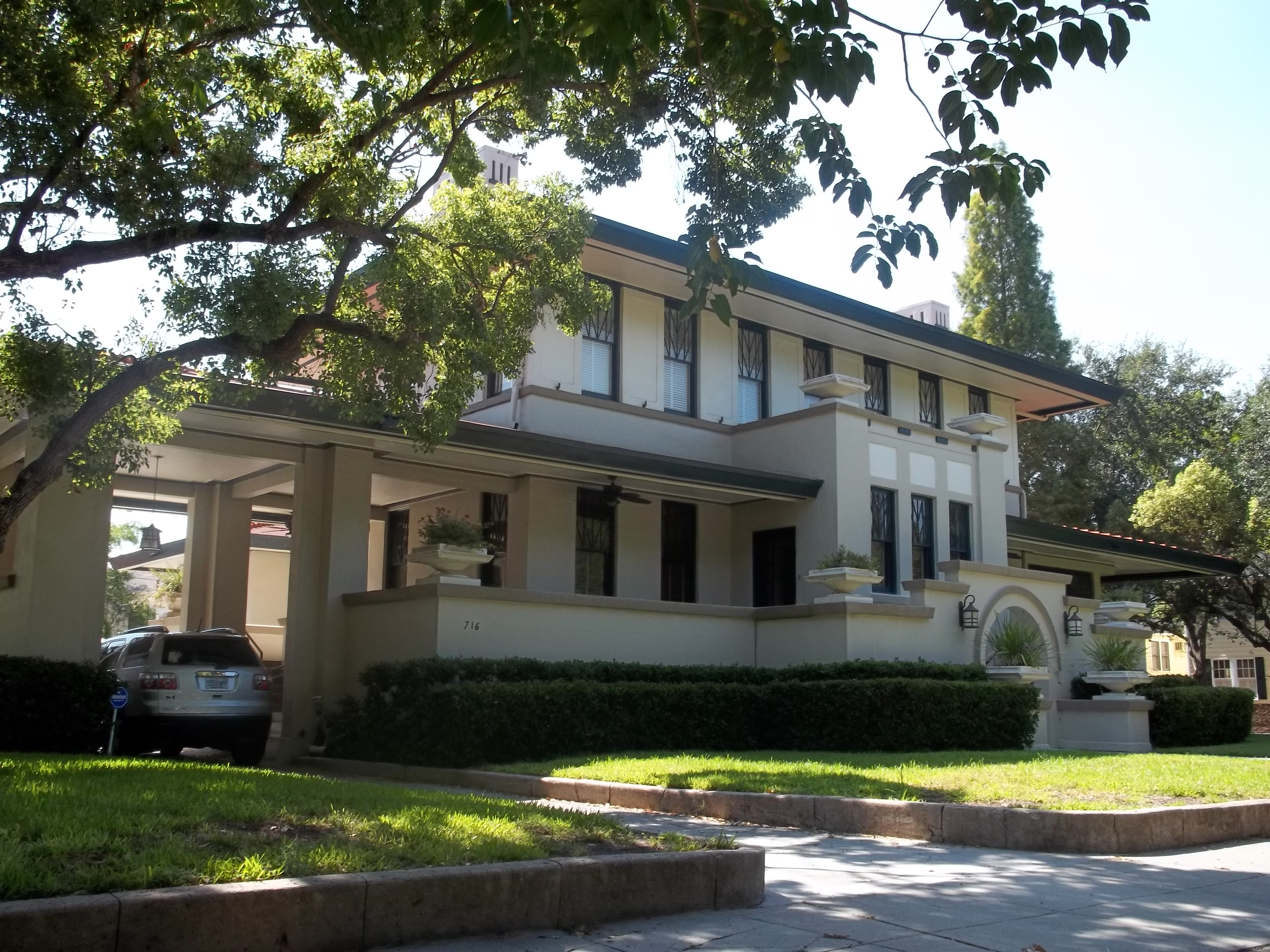
Leiman House

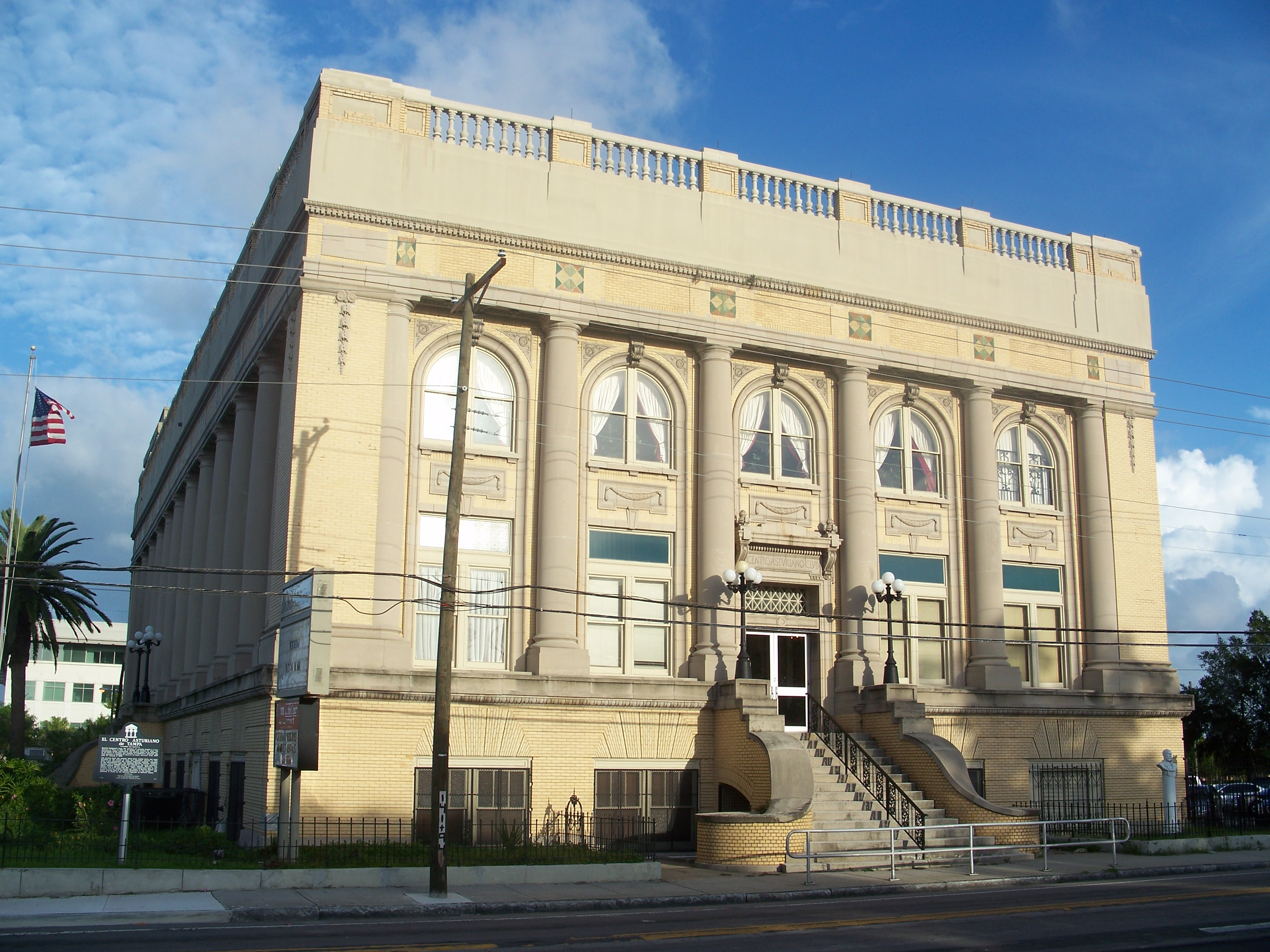
El Centro Asturiano

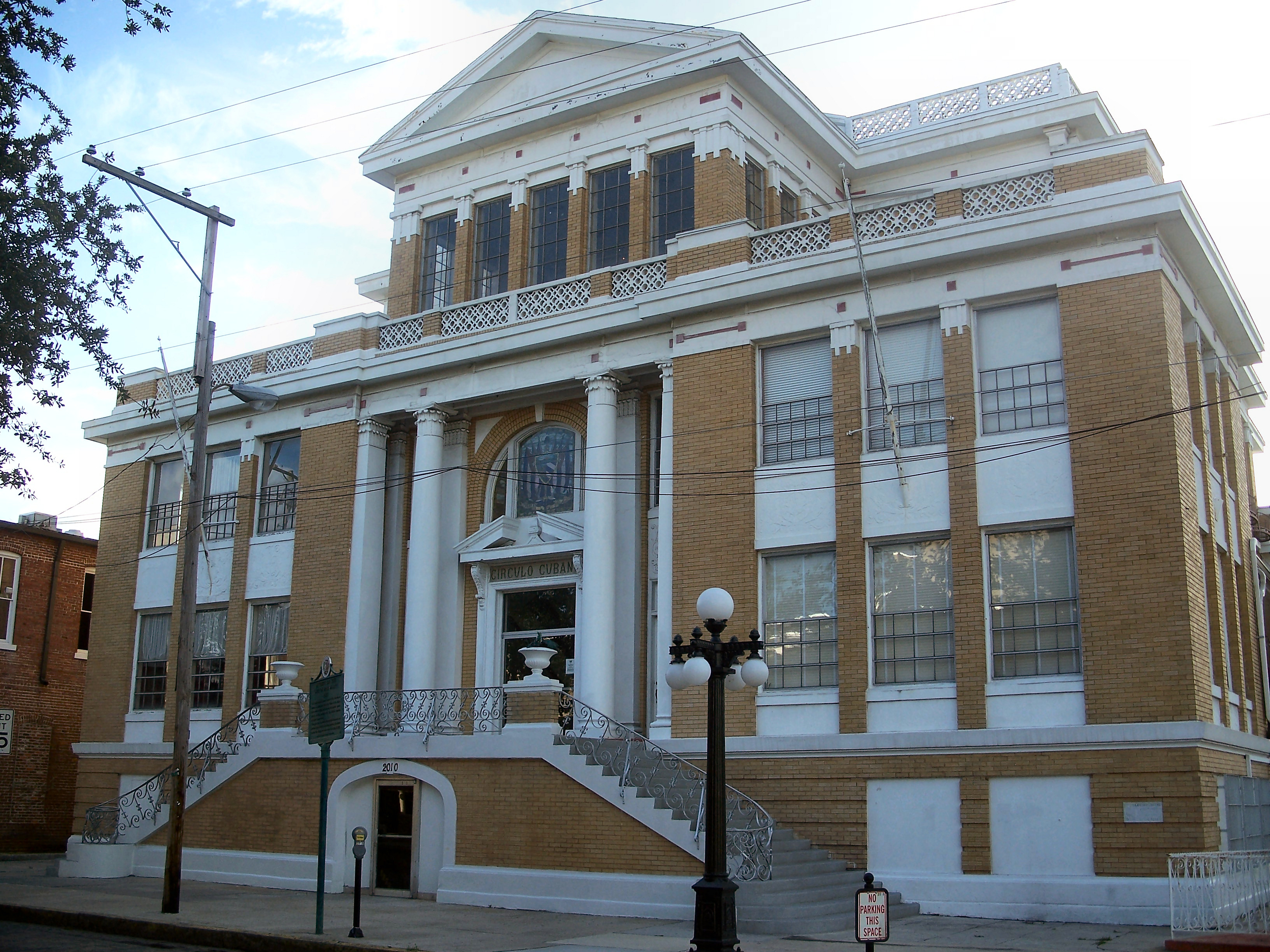
Circulo Cubano (Cuban Club)

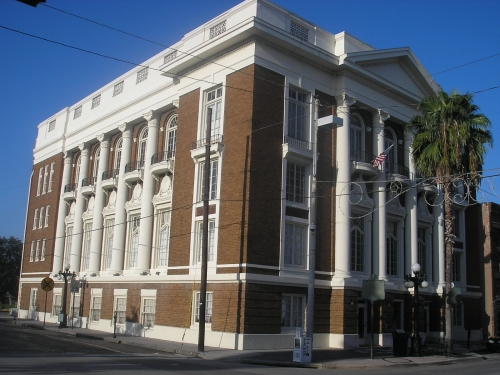
L'Unione Italiana (The Italian Club) in Ybor

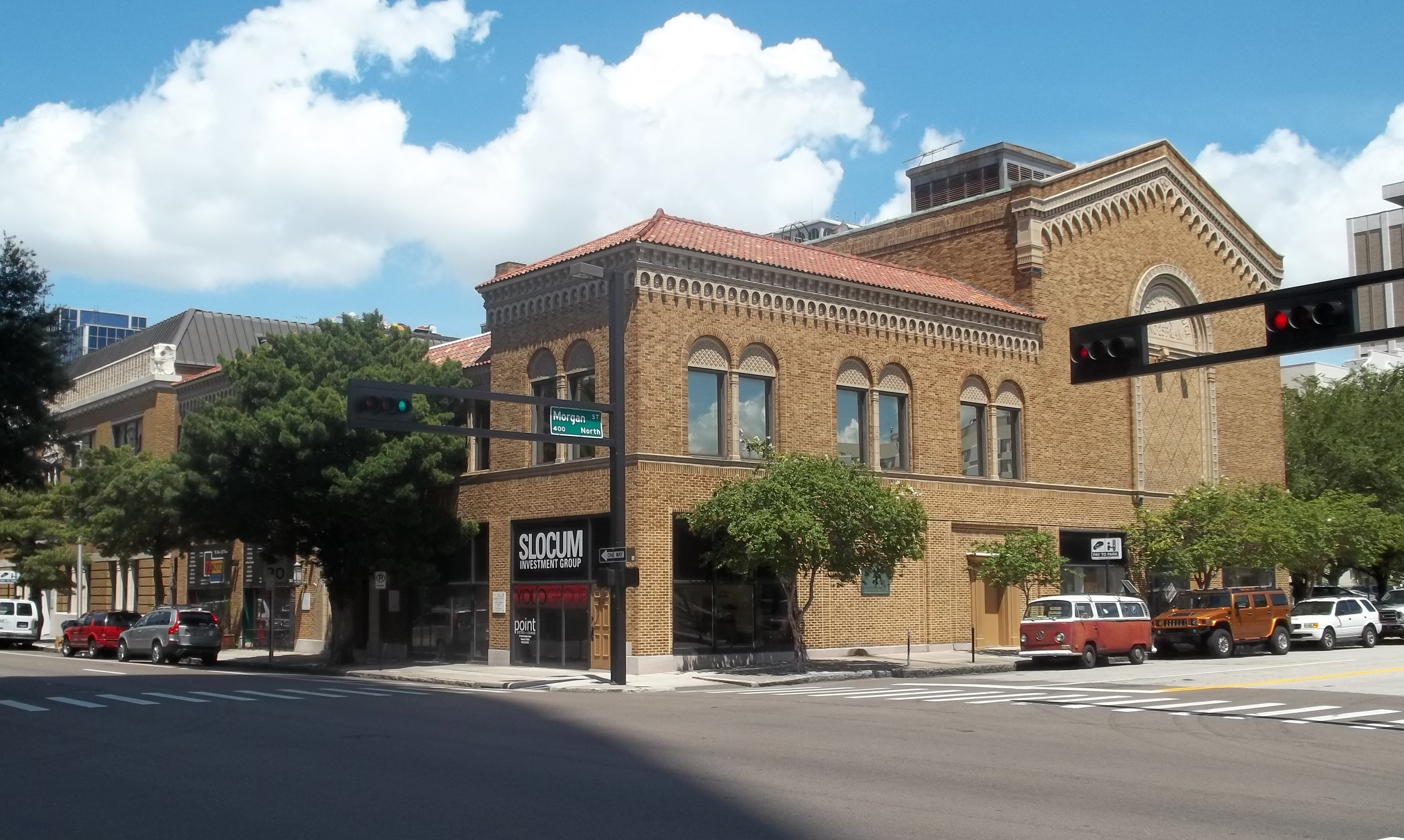
Masonic Temple No. 25

== See also ==
- J. A. Wood
