= DeSoto County Courthouse =

DeSoto County Courthouse may refer to:

- DeSoto County Courthouse (Florida), Arcadia, Florida
- DeSoto County Courthouse (Mississippi), Hernando, Mississippi
