= John J. Swearingen House =

Historic house in Florida, United States

- U.S. National Register of Historic Places
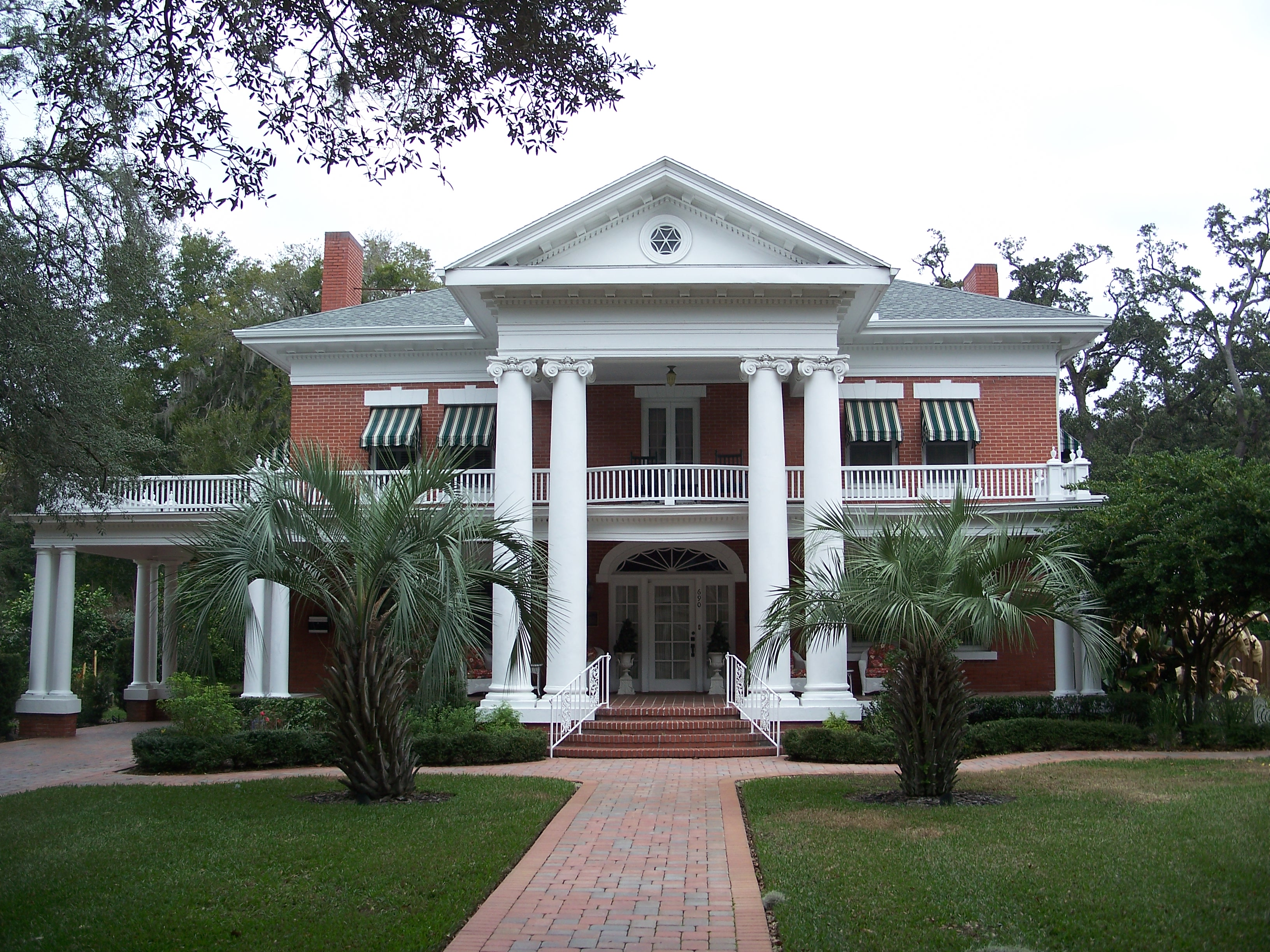

- Location within Florida Location within the United States
- Location: Bartow, Florida
- Coordinates: 27°53′52″N 81°50′10″W
- Built: 1923
- Architectural style: Colonial Revival
- NRHP reference No.: 82002379
- Added to NRHP: May 13, 1982

The John J. Swearingen House (also known as the R.H. Langford House) is a historic home in Bartow, Florida, designed by B. Clayton Bonfoey. It is located at 690 East Church Street. On May 13, 1982, it was added to the U.S. National Register of Historic Places.
