= Paul D. Adams =

United States Army general (1906–1987)

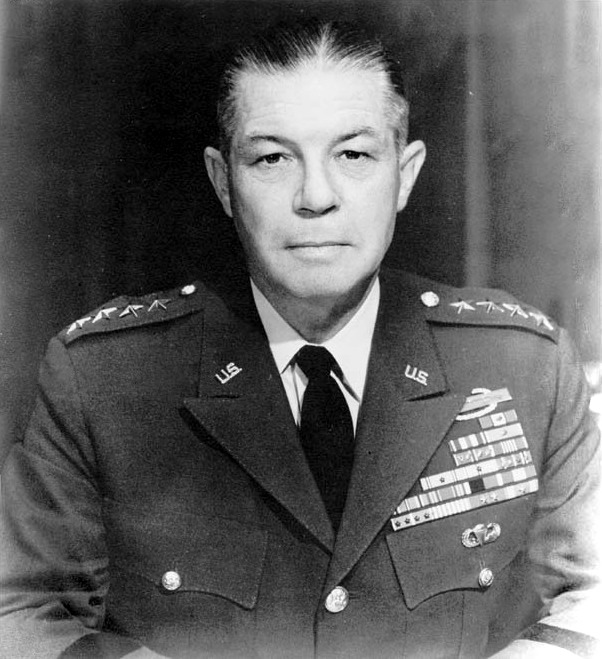
- General Paul DeWitt Adams
- Born: 6 October 1906; Heflin, Alabama, United States
- Died: 31 October 1987 (aged 81); Tampa, Florida, United States
- Burial place: Myrtle Hill Memorial Park
- Military career
- Allegiance: United States
- Branch: United States Army
- Service years: 1928–1966
- Rank: General
- Service number: 0-7306
- Unit: Infantry Branch
- Commands: United States Strike Command; Third United States Army; XVIII Airborne Corps; 101st Airborne Division; 25th Infantry Division
- Conflicts: World War II; Korean War
- Awards: Army Distinguished Service Medal (2); Silver Star; Legion of Merit (2); Bronze Star Medal (4)

General Paul DeWitt Adams (6 October 1906 – 31 October 1987) was a United States Army officer.

== Early life ==
Adams was born in Heflin, Alabama. After graduating from Marion Military Institute in 1924, he entered the United States Military Academy and graduated in 1928, receiving his commission in the infantry. Through his paternal family line he is a great-great-grandson of U.S. President John Quincy Adams and great-great-great-grandson of Founding Father and president John Adams.

== Military career ==
Adams as a United States Military Academy cadet c. 1928

Adams served with as executive officer of the 1st Special Service Force from 1942 to 1944, including during their assault on Kiska in 1943. Following that assignment, he became commanding officer of the 143d Infantry Regiment, 36th Infantry Division, serving in the Mediterranean Theater (Operation Dragoon) and European Theater from January 1944 to January 1945. He succeeded Frederic B. Butler as assistant division commander, 45th Infantry Division from January 1945 to January 1946. This was followed by staff assignments to Headquarters, Army Ground Forces in 1946 and Command and General Staff College from 1947 to 1950. He was a student and then faculty member at the Army War College from 1950 to 1951, before being deployed to fight in the Korean War. He consecutively served as commanding general, 25th Infantry Division, Chief of Staff of X Corps, and Chief of Staff Eighth United States Army during the Korean War. After the war, he was commanding general, 101st Airborne Division, from June to December 1953. From 1955 to 1957 he commanded XVIII Airborne Corps. He later served as commanding general, U.S. Army Forces in the Middle East in 1958. From 1959 to 1960, he commanded V Corps.

Adams concurrently served as commanding general, Third United States Army, and commanding general, Fort McPherson, Georgia, from 1960 to 1961. After receiving his fourth star in 1961, he became Commander-in-Chief, United States Strike Command, from 1961 to 1966.

Adams retired in 1966. He was president of Paul D. Adams & Associates from 1966 to 1971. He died on 31 October 1987 in Tampa, Florida, and was buried at Myrtle Hill Memorial Park.

== Honors and awards ==
=== Army Distinguished Service Medal ===
==== Citation ====
The President of the United States of America, authorized by Act of Congress 9 July 1918, takes pleasure in presenting the Army Distinguished Service Medal to Major General Paul DeWitt Adams (ASN: 0-7306), United States Army, for exceptionally meritorious and distinguished services to the Government of the United States, in a duty of great responsibility as Commanding General, 25th Infantry Division, Chief of Staff of X Corps, and Chief of Staff Eighth United States Army, from 9 February 1952 to 4 April 1953.

===== Citation =====
The President of the United States of America, authorized by Act of Congress 9 July 1918, takes pleasure in presenting a Bronze Oak Leaf Cluster in lieu of a Second Award of the Army Distinguished Service Medal to Major General Paul DeWitt Adams (ASN: 0-7306), United States Army, for exceptionally meritorious and distinguished services to the Government of the United States, in a duty of great responsibility from 26 July 1958 to 25 October 1958.

===== Citation =====
The President of the United States of America, authorized by Act of Congress 9 July 1918, takes pleasure in presenting a Second Bronze Oak Leaf Cluster in lieu of a Third Award of the Army Distinguished Service Medal to General Paul DeWitt Adams (ASN: 0-7306), United States Army, for exceptionally meritorious and distinguished services to the Government of the United States, in a duty of great responsibility as Commander in Chief, United States Strike Command, during the period from October 1961 to October 1966.

=== Silver Star ===
==== Citation ====
The President of the United States of America, authorized by Act of Congress 9 July 1918, takes pleasure in presenting the Army Distinguished Service Medal to Major General Paul DeWitt Adams (ASN: 0-7306), United States Army, for exceptionally meritorious and distinguished services to the Government of the United States, in a duty of great responsibility as Commanding General, 25th Infantry Division, Chief of Staff of X Corps, and Chief of Staff Eighth United States Army, from 9 February 1952 to 4 April 1953.

== Notes ==
- R. Manning Ancell, Biographical Dictionary of World War II Generals and Flag Officers, p. 2 (1996)

Military offices
Preceded by Ray E. Porter	Commanding General 101st Airborne Division; May–September 1953	Succeeded by Riley F. Ennis
Preceded by Francis William Farrell	Commanding General V Corps; 1959–1960	Succeeded by Frederic J. Brown
Preceded by Thomas J. H. Trapnell	Commanding General Third Army; 1960–1961	Succeeded by Thomas J. H. Trapnell
Preceded by Newly activated organization	Commander-in-Chief United States Strike Comnand; 1961–1966	Succeeded by Theodore J. Conway
