= Roosevelt Elementary School (Tampa, Florida) =

- Theodore Roosevelt Elementary School
- U.S. National Register of Historic Places
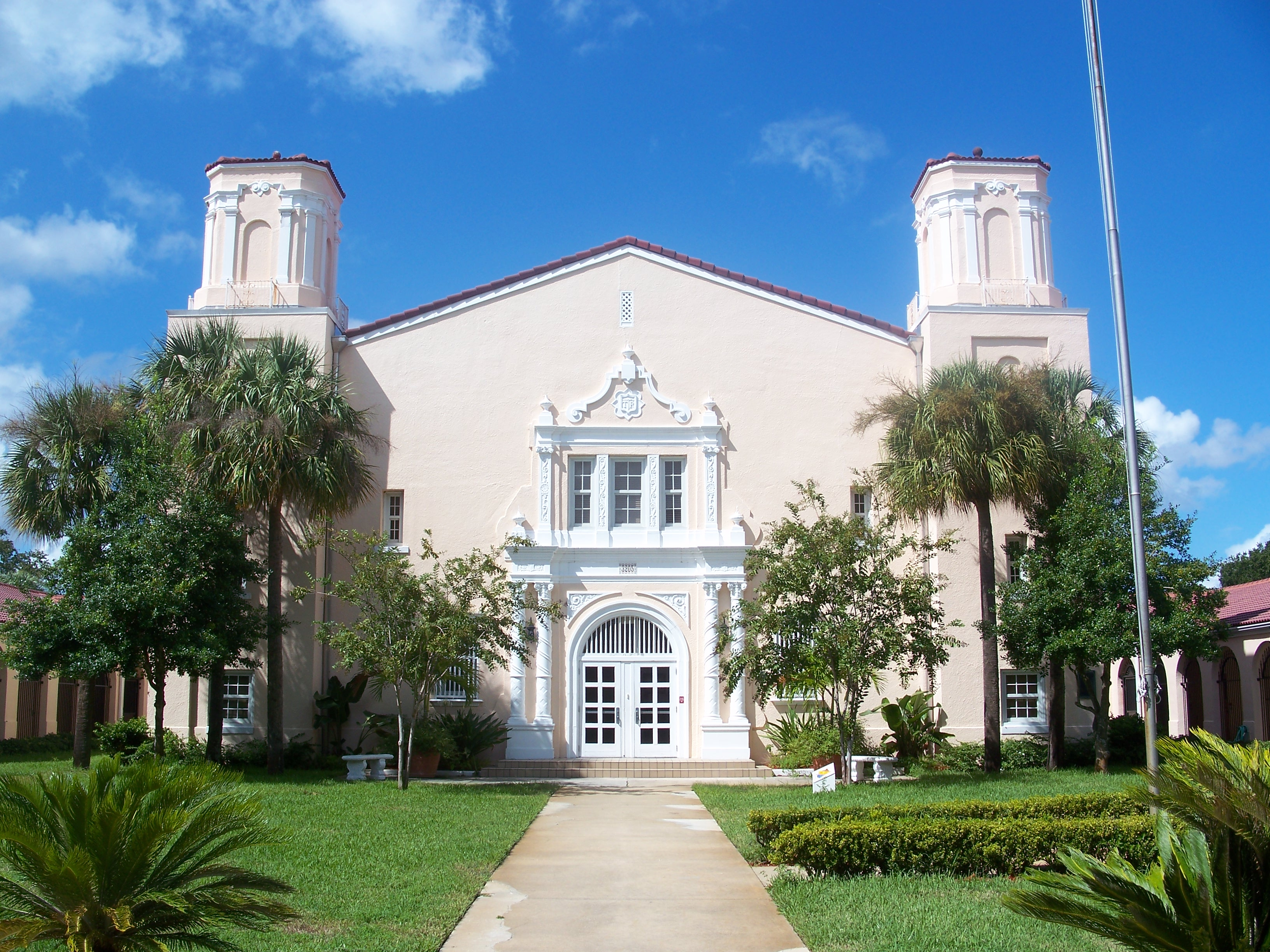

- Location within Florida Location within the United States
- Location: 3205 S. Ferdinand Ave., Tampa, Florida
- Coordinates: 27°54′59″N 82°29′52″W
- Area: less than one acre
- Built: 1925
- Architect: Bonfoey, B.C.; Horton & Smith
- Architectural style: Mission/Spanish Revival
- NRHP reference No.: 06000443
- Added to NRHP: May 31, 2006

Theodore Roosevelt Elementary School
- Tampa, Florida

Information
- Type: Public
- Established: 1925
- School district: Hillsborough County Public Schools
- Principal: Meredith Scribner
- Colors: Khaki and Navy
- Mascot: Rough Riders
- Website: Roosevelt Elementary School (HCPS)

The Roosevelt Elementary School is a historic U.S. school in Tampa, Florida. It is a part of Hillsborough County Public Schools. It is located at 3205 South Ferdinand Avenue and was constructed in 1925. On May 31, 2006, it was added to the U.S. National Register of Historic Places.

== School history ==
Roosevelt Elementary was constructed in 1925 and officially opened to students in 1926. The original complex comprised only the main, two-story building and its adjacent wings. The main building included a small cluster of offices, a cafeteria, and the present-day auditorium. There were also 12 classrooms (6 in each wing) within the original campus.

In 1946, as the South Tampa area grew, the original wings were expanded, adding six additional classrooms. Later in the 1950s, Obispo Street between Concordia and Ferdinand Avenues was closed to create parking for teachers and faculty. A few years later, an eight-classroom wing was built alongside Obispo St. In 1961, the current cafeteria building was added at the western end of the original wings.

In 1990, the entire campus was renovated. Among the improvements, the original lower floor of the main building was reconfigured to create offices for school administration. A media center and faculty lounge were also created. Several classrooms were also added, and a computer lab would follow in 1994. The school's auditorium was dedicated to former US Congressman and Roosevelt alumni Sam Gibbons in 2001.

In 2004, with the population growth in South Tampa continuing, Roosevelt Elementary began making changes for its future. The 1955 wing was expanded to create four more classrooms and entire campus was updated with new technology to thrust the school into the 21st century. Roosevelt was added to National Register of Historic Places in 2006.

In 2007, the school underwent yet another expansion with an eight classroom building on the southwest corner of the campus, bringing the total number of classrooms to 35. A covered pavilion was also built along Concordia Ave.
