= Historic Spanish Point =

Historic house in Florida, United States

- Established: 1982
- Location: 401 North Tamiami Trail; Osprey, Florida
- Coordinates: 27°12′05″N 82°29′25″W
- Type: Archaeological museum and botanical garden
- Owner: Marie Selby Botanical Gardens
- Public transit access: Breeze Transit
- Website: selby.org/hsp
- Osprey Archeological and Historic Site
- U.S. National Register of Historic Places
- NRHP reference No.: 75000569
- Added to NRHP: April 16, 1975

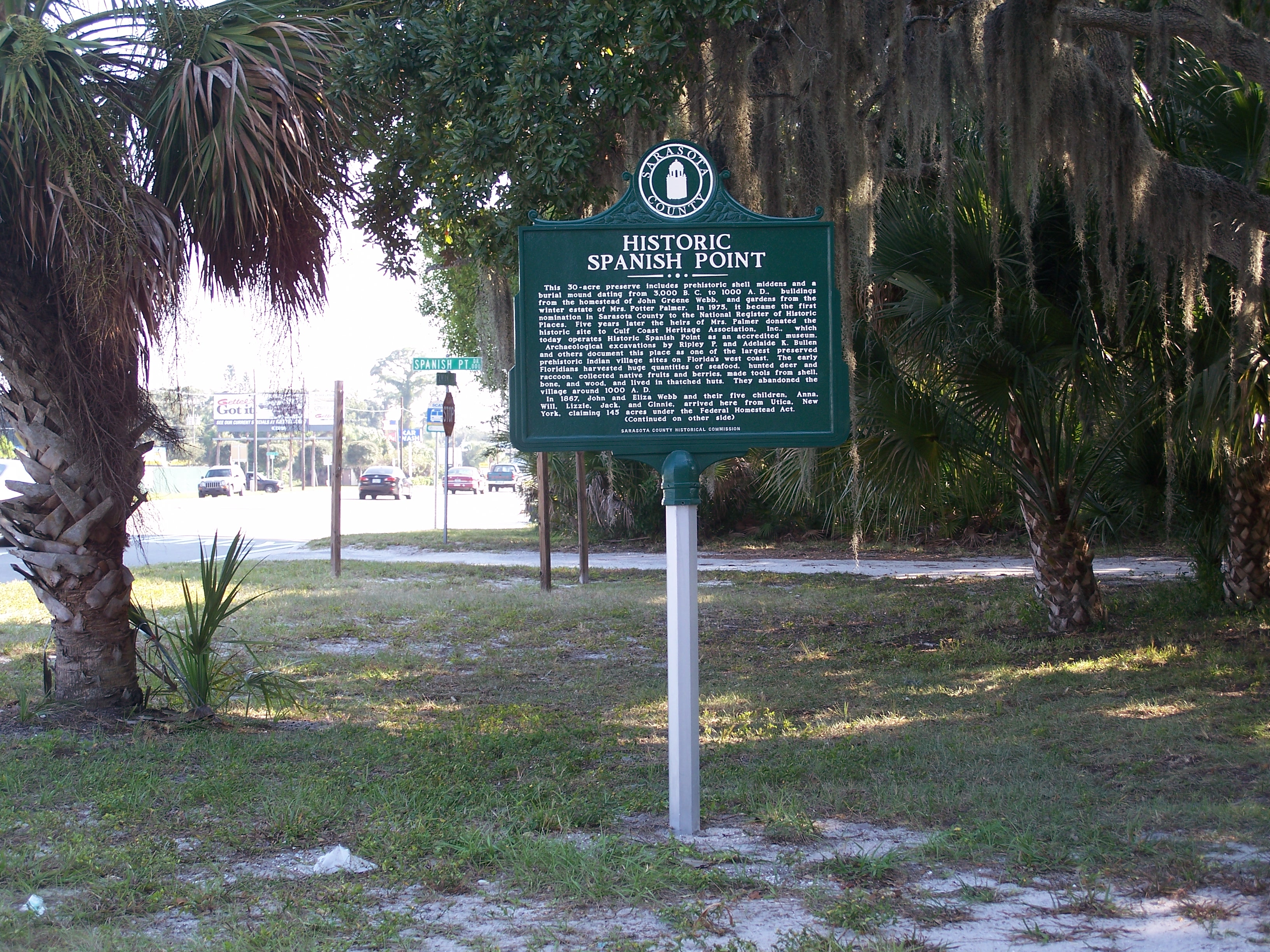
Historical marker

Historic Spanish Point is a 33-acre (13 ha) museum and environmental complex located in Osprey, Florida at 337 North Tamiami Trail. The museum includes an archeological exhibit of a prehistoric Calusa shell mound known as a midden, a turn-of-the-century pioneer homestead historic house museum, a citrus packing house, a chapel, a boatyard, gardens, and nature trails.

== History ==
An archaeological record exists on the site from approximately 5,000 years of Florida prehistory. Habitation of the site spans the Late Archaic period (5,900–3,200 years ago) through to the Manasota and Late Woodland periods (3,200–1,000 years ago) Prehistoric people living on Charlotte Harbor's shoreline began using ceramics and transitioned from nomadic hunters and gatherers to settled subsistence societies. They capitalized on the abundant resources provided by the Gulf of Mexico, marsh, woodland, and bay ecosystems. They used growing specialized tool technology to establish the permanent and seasonal settlements further. These people disappear from the archaeological record of the site sometime before 1100 AD.

Webb and his family moved from Utica, New York to establish a homestead on the shores of Little Sarasota Bay. A Spanish trader the family met in Key West told them of an elevated point of land on the bay. The Webbs named their homestead Spanish Point in honor of the trader's good advice. John Webb and his family planted citrus, sugar cane, and vegetables, and built a packing house to prepare their goods for market. In the early 1900s, the Webb family sold parcels of the homestead to new settlers.

In 1910, a wealthy Chicago socialite named Bertha Palmer, widow of Potter Palmer, purchased the Spanish Point homestead, as well as thousands of acres for cattle ranching, citrus groves, and real estate development. The Webb homestead was part of the land she chose for her 360-acre (150 ha) estate, which she named Osprey Point. She preserved the pioneer buildings and connected them with lavish formal gardens and lawns. Mrs. Palmer died of breast cancer at age 68 in May 1918. Her family maintained Osprey Point, and in 1959, her grandson Gordon Palmer sponsored the three-year excavation of the archaeological site by Ripley P. Bullen. The site is now home to the museum at Historic Spanish Point.

Gordon's widow, Janis, along with Potter Palmer IV and other family members, encouraged the nomination of Spanish Point to the National Register of Historic Places (NRHP). In 1975, it became the first site in Sarasota County to be listed in the National Register. In 1980, the Palmer heirs donated the National Register site to Gulf Coast Heritage Association.

In May 2020, Historic Spanish Point became a companion campus of Marie Selby Botanical Gardens.

== Exhibits ==
- Visitors' Center at Osprey School - This building was one of five schools built between 1926 and 1928 along the Tamiami Trail in Sarasota County to serve a growing population due to the 1920s real-estate boom. Designed by Tampa architect M. Leo Elliott in the Spanish Colonial Revival style, the building is listed in the National Register of Historic Places. It served as the Historic Spanish Point Visitors' Center housing an orientation program, administrative offices, and a museum store. It now houses the Osprey Public Library.

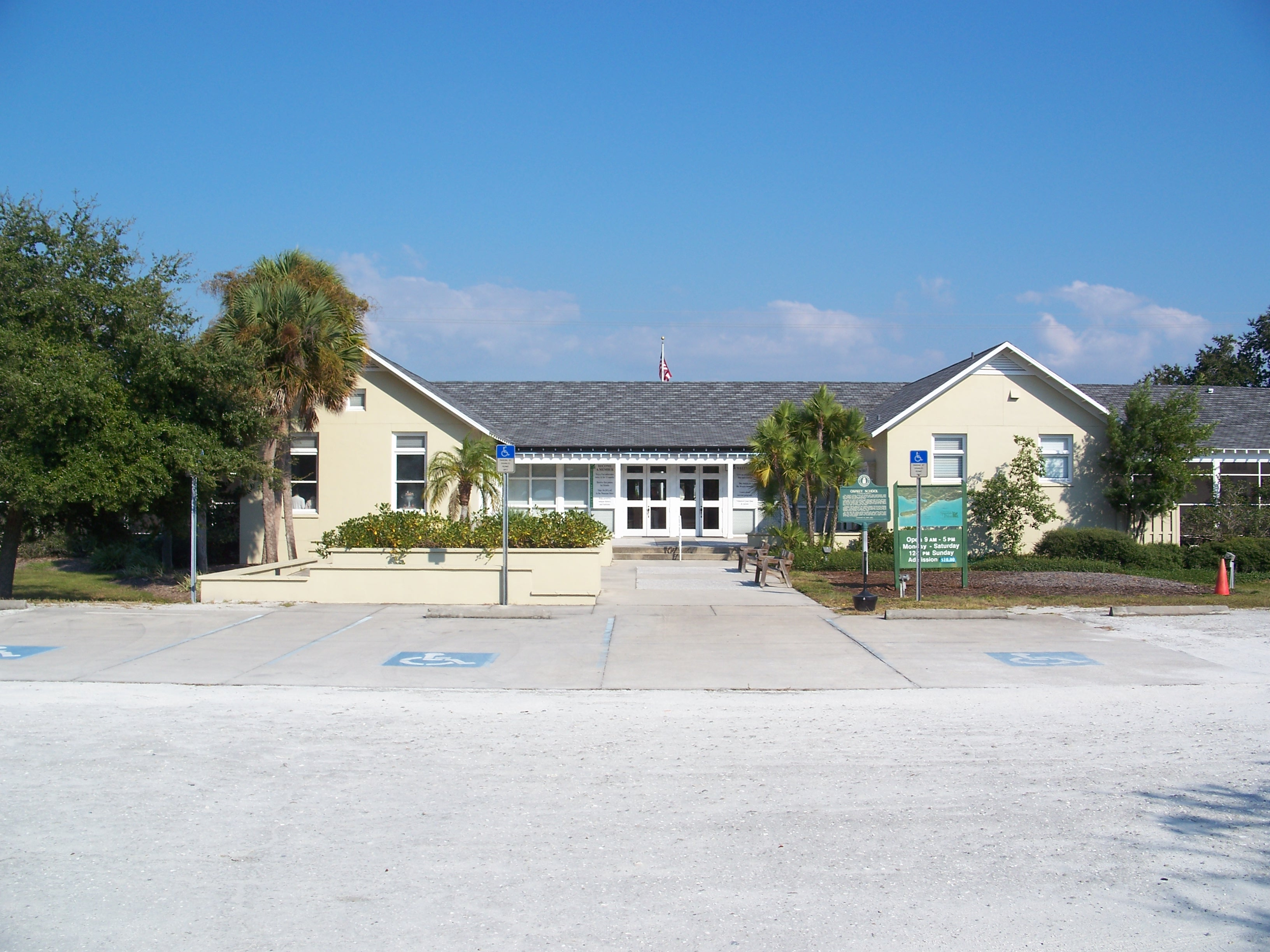
Old Osprey School

- Entrance Cottage - The Entrance Cottage is located at the entrance to the historic site.
- The Gazebo - The Gazebo is similar to one that was part of Mrs. Palmers' Osprey Point estate, 1910–1918. Although not fully restored, it features many native ferns, trees and epiphytes (air plants).
- Palmer Water Garden - The Water Garden, or Ornamental Pond, was created by Mrs. Potter Palmer as part of her Osprey Point estate.
- Burial Mound - The Burial Mound was built by many generations of prehistoric native North Americans who lived along the Shell Ridge Midden from about 300 to 1000. Human bones and ceremonial offerings of shark teeth, smashed pottery and other materials were periodically placed on the mound, then covered with sand.
- Webb Packing House - Citrus fruit was washed, cured, sorted and crated in the Packing House for shipment to Key West, Florida or Cedar Key, Florida, where it then was shipped to northern markets. The building is an authentic reconstruction of the original.
- Magic - When not out cruising the bay, Magic, a replica of what was originally a sailboat that was retrofitted as a motor launch by John Webb around 1900, is moored near the Packing House pier. John Webb's grandson, Charles Webb, used Magic to transport and entertain guests at Webb's Winter Resort. It has been told for years by the docents at Spanish Point that the demise of the Magic was not known. It was discovered that Charles Webb had left a handwritten journal in which he told of the demise of the Magic. A hurricane hit the Osprey area in 1921. Before the hurricane arrived, Charles Webb dragged the Magic as far up on land as he could. Further than he had ever seen the waterline rise to previously. However, the hurricane was too strong. Magic had been completely destroyed by the storm and sea.
- Mary's Chapel - Mary's Chapel is named for Mary Sherrill, a young woman who died while staying at Webbs' Winter Resort, operated by the Webb family. The 1986 reconstruction includes the six stained-glass windows salvaged from the original building by Mabel Webb Johnson Sims. The chapel is a popular place for small country weddings.
- Pioneer Cemetery - Next to Mary's Chapel is the family graveyard where members of the Webb family and other area pioneers are interred.
- Duchene Lawn and Classic Portal - Mrs. Palmer's formal Duchene Lawn features two rows of queen palms, Phoenix reclinatas and a Washington palms. The Classic Portal framed a view of Webb's Cove during Mrs. Palmer's era.
- Lychee Field - Now a grassy field with a few lychee trees, the field was once a large grove of lychee trees, a fruit-producing evergreen imported from the Far East. The Lychee Field was part of Gordon Palmer's nursery in the 1950s.
- Butterfly Garden - The garden was designed to provide for the complete life cycle of butterflies. This area showcases larval and nectar plants for monarchs, swallowtails, zebra longwings, and other butterflies. The flowering plants in the garden are nectar plants. Milkweed is both a larval and a nectar plant.
- Fern Walk - The entrance to Mrs. Palmer's Fern Walk is under the aqueduct. In a natural hollow created by the archaic midden, beautiful ferns and palms are featured.
- Guptill House - Frank and Lizzie Webb Guptill built their home on the prehistoric Archaic Midden in 1901. They rented rooms to winter boarders. Ten years later, the home was acquired by Mrs. Potter Palmer and called Hill Cottage. The Guptill House is furnished to depict the Florida pioneer era.
- Pioneer Boat Yard - For early settlers along Florida's coast, local estuaries and the Gulf of Mexico were central to life. The Webb family homestead was dependent on aquatic resources, boats, and maritime commerce. Frank Guptill operated his boatyard on the shores of Little Sarasota Bay very near the place where this working boatyard is built.
- Archaic Midden - Known as Palmer site 8s02, this is the oldest midden at Historic Spanish Point, dating to before 3000 BC. The site is thought to have been built by the Calusa Indian tribe. The Archaic Midden is made up of layers of shellfish, shell tools, pottery, and other early artifacts built up through the Late Archaic (5,900-3,200 years ago), Manasota, and Late Woodland (3,200–1,000 years ago) periods. It is the only archaeological exhibit in the United States that is built inside an archaic midden. The occupation would have been by the Calusa people, a band of complex hunter-gatherers who inhabited the Southwest Coast of Florida.
- Jungle Walk and Aqueduct - The Jungle Walk was created by Mrs. Bertha Palmer with shell paths meandering past classical urns and tropical vegetation. A miniature aqueduct features water flowing over a shell cascade. To the north was once the Blue Garden and Mrs. Palmer's house, The Oaks.
- Cock's Footbridge - The original Footbridge was constructed in the late 1890s by Daniel Cock, whose boarding house, "Fiddler's Lodge", once stood at its northern end. Today, it provides an excellent view of the mangrove shoreline and the mooring of Lizzie G. and other wooden boats.
- Lizzie G. - This sharpie sailboat is an operational replica of a 1890s boat and was designed by master boatbuilder Stan Lowe & built under his direction by volunteers at Historic Spanish Point using traditional tools, techniques, and materials. The wood was harvested from local trees, cut down, and hand-shaped. No power tools were used in building the boat. The sails are hand-stitched cotton.
- Point Cottage - Also known as "Bertha's Cottage", the house was constructed in 1931 for Potter Palmer III and his wife, Rose. It was later occupied by Potter's sister, Bertha, and her husband, Oakleigh Thorne. Today, it serves as a center for educational programs.
- A Window to the Past - This archaeological exhibition is located inside a prehistoric shell midden. It features an audiovisual program about Historic Spanish Point's first inhabitants, a diorama that depicts a prehistoric dwelling, exhibits, and interactive displays.
- Shell Ridge Midden - The highest point on the Shell Ridge Midden was created by the early inhabitants, perhaps to serve as a platform for the chief's residence or temple. It is also the site where the Webbs built their home in 1867.
- Sunken Garden and Pergola - The Sunken Garden was created by Mrs. Bertha Palmer between 1912 and 1915 as a formal garden area within the native Florida environment. The adjacent Pergola was constructed to provide views of the bay. Today, it is a popular wedding venue.
- White Cottage - Originally built by Jack Webb in 1884, this building became "The Dormitory" in the 1890s for the Webbs' Winter Resort. The first floor features exhibit galleries. The second floor houses a research center that is open by appointment only.
