= Osprey, Florida =

- Census-designated place
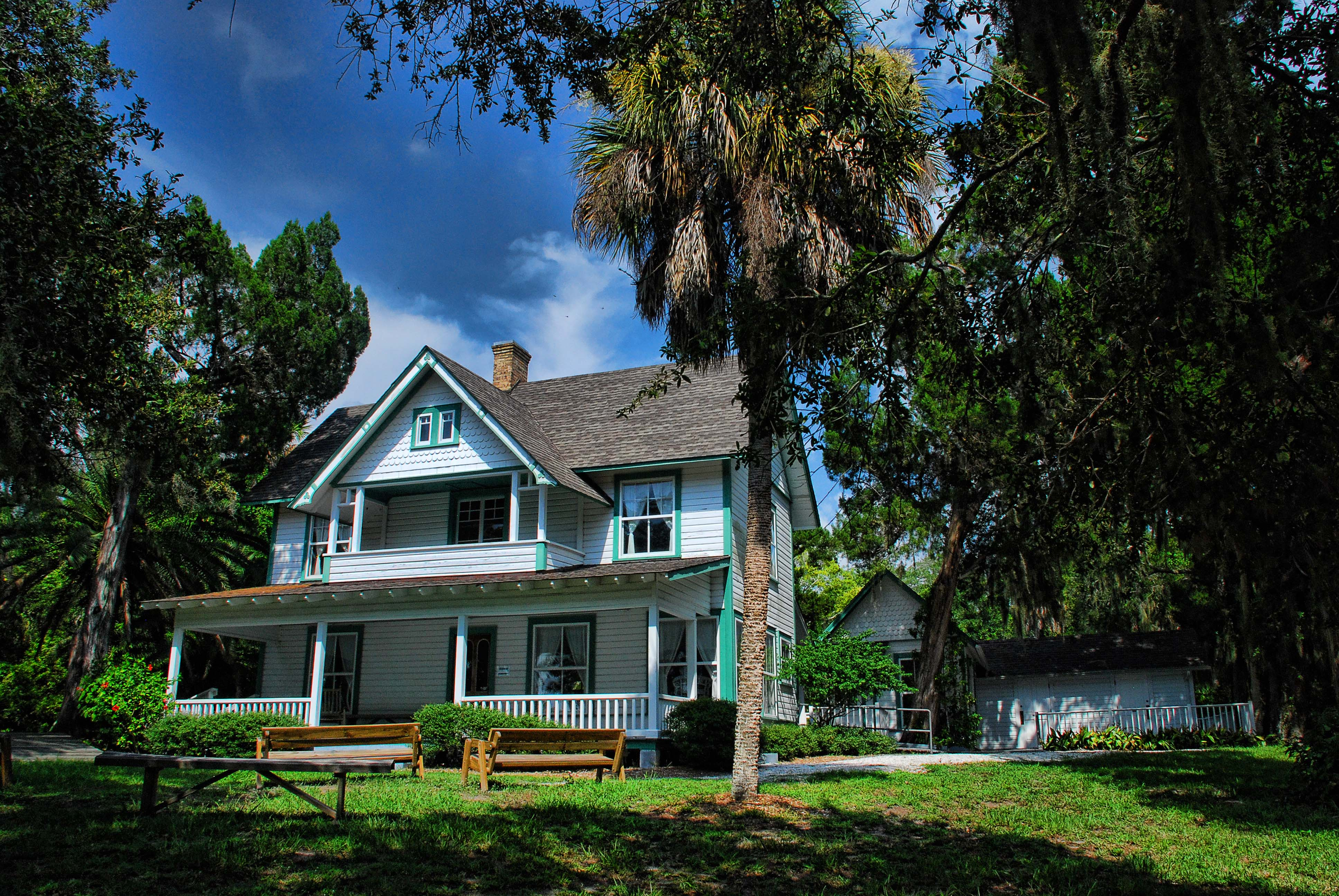
- Guptill House in Osprey, Sarasota, Florida

- Location in Sarasota County and the state of Florida
- Coordinates: 27°12′06″N 82°29′20″W
- Country: United States
- State: Florida
- County: Sarasota

Area
  - Total: 6.07 sq mi (15.73 km^{2})
  - Land: 5.23 sq mi (13.54 km^{2})
  - Water: 0.85 sq mi (2.19 km^{2})
- Elevation: 16 ft (4.9 m)

Population (2020)
  - Total: 6,690
  - Density: 1,280.0/sq mi (494.22/km^{2})
- Time zone: UTC-5 (Eastern (EST))
  - Summer (DST): UTC-4 (EDT)
- ZIP code: 34229
- Area code: 941
- FIPS code: 12-53425
- GNIS feature ID: 2403382

Osprey is a census-designated place (CDP) in Sarasota County, Florida, United States. The population was 6,690 at the 2020 census, up from 6,100 at the 2010 census. The town is located in Southwest Florida and is part of the North Port–Bradenton–Sarasota, Florida Metropolitan Statistical Area.

== Geography ==
According to the United States Census Bureau, the CDP has a total area of 6.1 square miles (16 km^{2}), of which 5.5 square miles (14 km^{2}) is land and 0.6 square miles (1.6 km^{2}) is water.

== Demographics ==
Historical population
Census	Pop.	Note	%±
1990	2,597		—
2000	4,143		59.5%
2010	6,100		47.2%
2020	6,690		9.7%
U.S. Decennial Census

=== 2020 census ===
As of the 2020 census, Osprey had a population of 6,690. The median age was 62.7 years. 10.9% of residents were under the age of 18 and 45.8% of residents were 65 years of age or older. For every 100 females there were 92.7 males, and for every 100 females age 18 and over there were 91.9 males age 18 and over.

100.0% of residents lived in urban areas, while 0.0% lived in rural areas.

There were 3,201 households in Osprey, of which 13.3% had children under the age of 18 living in them. Of all households, 60.9% were married-couple households, 13.0% were households with a male householder and no spouse or partner present, and 21.3% were households with a female householder and no spouse or partner present. About 26.7% of all households were made up of individuals and 16.9% had someone living alone who was 65 years of age or older.

There were 3,740 housing units, of which 14.4% were vacant. The homeowner vacancy rate was 2.5% and the rental vacancy rate was 14.4%.

Racial composition as of the 2020 census
Race	Number	Percent
White	5,971	89.3%
Black or African American	36	0.5%
American Indian and Alaska Native	8	0.1%
Asian	219	3.3%
Native Hawaiian and Other Pacific Islander	4	0.1%
Some other race	67	1.0%
Two or more races	385	5.8%
Hispanic or Latino (of any race)	313	4.7%

=== 2000 census ===
As of the census of 2000, there were 4,143 people, 1,965 households, and 1,383 families residing in the CDP. The population density was 759.5 inhabitants per square mile (293.2/km^{2}). There were 2,267 housing units at an average density of 415.6 per square mile (160.5/km^{2}). The racial makeup of the CDP was 97.59% White, 0.19% African American, 0.14% Native American, 0.87% Asian, 0.12% Pacific Islander, 0.36% from other races, and 0.72% from two or more races. Hispanic or Latino of any race were 1.40% of the population.

There were 1,965 households, out of which 16.2% had children under the age of 18 living with them, 62.7% were married couples living together, 5.2% had a female householder with no husband present, and 29.6% were non-families. 25.0% of all households were made up of individuals, and 13.5% had someone living alone who was 65 years of age or older. The average household size was 2.11 and the average family size was 2.47.

In the CDP, the population was spread out, with 14.0% under the age of 18, 3.2% from 18 to 24, 18.0% from 25 to 44, 33.3% from 45 to 64, and 31.5% who were 65 years of age or older. The median age was 54 years. For every 100 females, there were 94.3 males. For every 100 females age 18 and over, there were 93.4 males.

The median income for a household in the CDP was $55,761, and the median income for a family was $73,103. Males had a median income of $41,136 versus $25,909 for females. The per capita income for the CDP was $49,862. About 3.1% of families and 6.5% of the population were below the poverty line, including 9.1% of those under age 18 and 3.2% of those age 65 or over.

== Sites of interest ==
Osprey is home to Historic Spanish Point, a 30-acre (12 ha) museum and environmental complex that includes a prehistoric Calusa shell mound, a turn-of-the-century pioneer homestead museum, a citrus packing house, chapel, boatyard, gardens and nature trails. The Osprey Public Library is located at Historic Spanish Point and is part of the Sarasota County Public Library System.

Osprey is the mailing address for Oscar Scherer State Park and the new Scherer Thaxton Preserve, two of the few protected areas maintaining habitat for the threatened Florida scrub jay. Osprey is also the location of the Blackburn Point Bridge, a one-lane bridge over the Intracoastal Waterway that is listed on the National Register of Historic Places.

Osprey is also the site of an unsolved 1959 family massacre.

== Osprey Public Library at Historic Spanish Point ==
The Osprey Public Library at Historic Spanish Point is the smallest in Sarasota County. The space is only 630 square feet and is a conversion of a schoolhouse full of rich history. The branch is the county’s first "connections" library, based on the King County, Washington, model, offering online access to the resources of the entire library system in a modest space (630 square feet) with sustainable operating costs.

The Osprey Library opened on November 10, 2011, and offers free Wi-Fi access, online availability of the entire library catalog, plus pick-up and drop-off service items from other libraries within the system. Some improvements were made to the original school building, such as an acoustical ceiling and panels for the wall, window treatments that buffer the sound, and carpeting. The branch is close to the main road, so these renovations offered an immediate improvement in noise reduction.

The Osprey School served the Osprey and Vamo communities from 1927 through June 1976. The land where the school resides is part of the 145-acre homestead of John and Eliza Webb, who settled in Spanish Point in 1867. When it became apparent that the community needed a new school, the land was sold to the school board for $10 on December 28, 1926, by Mabel Webb Johnson and her husband, Ernest. The school was designed by Tampa architect M. Leo Elliot. His plan for the Spanish Colonial Revival-style building recognized the importance of cross-ventilation in a hot and humid climate. The layout, with all the classrooms in a line, took advantage of cross breezes for cooling and an exterior hallway shaded classrooms from the afternoon sun. The one-story, six-classroom school initially served grades one through nine and was constructed by Becchetti and Romersa for $19,000.

The school opened in 1927 but, like most Sarasota County schools, had to close for several months in 1933 because of a lack of revenue. During difficult economic times, parental and teacher involvement sustained Osprey School. After World War II, when the county experience renewed economic growth, the school was rewired in 1959 to allow for air conditioning and heating units. Osprey School survived without further improvement until June 1976, when it closed. Students in the area transferred to schools north or south of the community. In 1994, the building was listed on the National Register of Historic Places. The building was used as the School Board’s Teacher Education until 1989. The building remained empty until 1995 when it became the visitor center for Historic Spanish Point, and the Sarasota County library system turned a part of the schoolhouse into the Osprey Public Library in 2011.
