= Leiman House =

Historic house in Florida, United States

- U.S. National Register of Historic Places
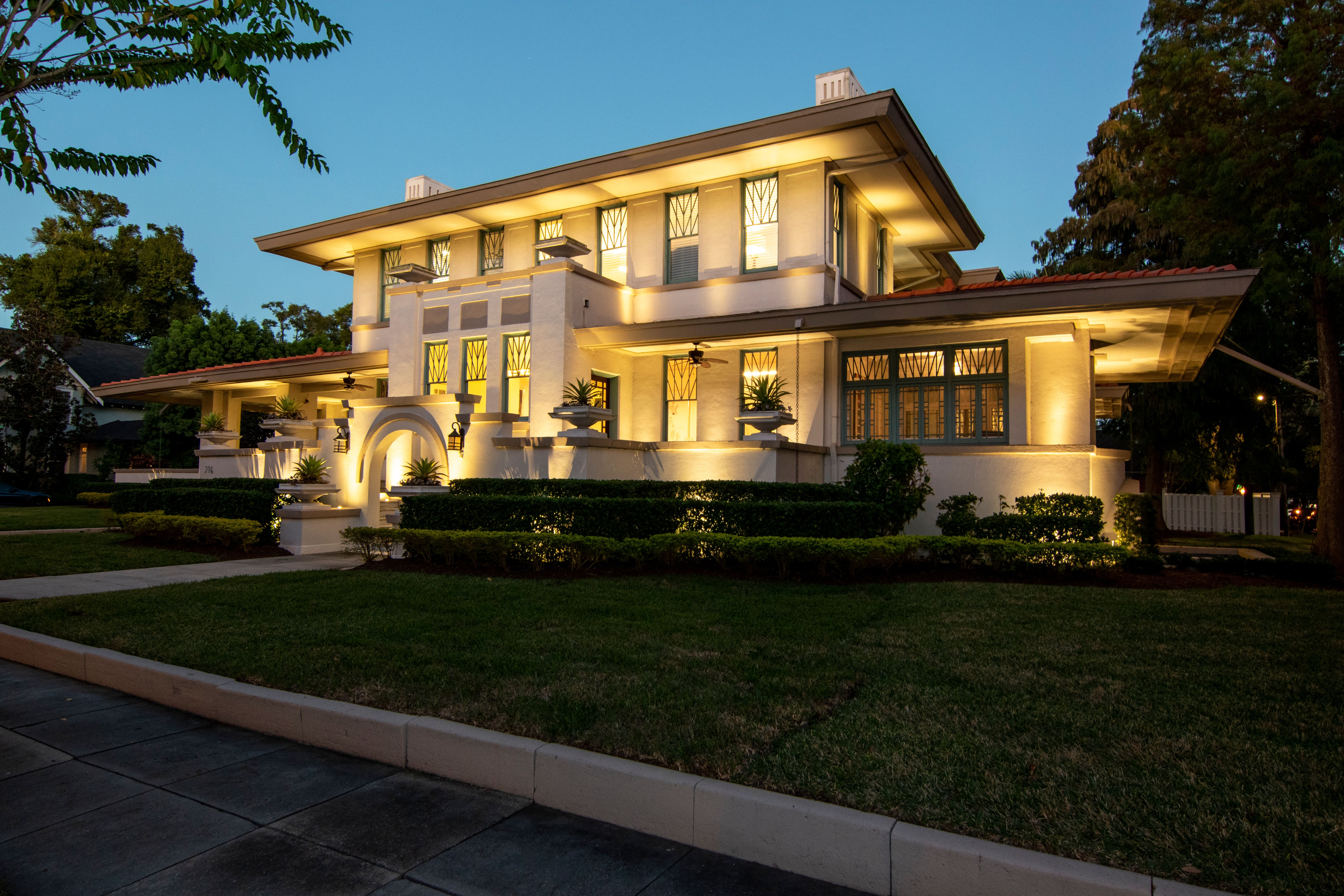
- c. 2022

- Location within Florida Location within the United States
- Location: 716 S. Newport Ave., Tampa, Florida
- Coordinates: 27°56′8″N 82°28′18″W
- Area: less than one acre
- Built: 1914
- Architect: M. Leo Elliott
- Architectural style: Prairie School
- NRHP reference No.: 74000635
- Added to NRHP: September 9, 1974

The Leiman House is a historic home in Tampa, Florida. It is located at 716 South Newport Avenue. On September 9, 1974, it was added to the U.S. National Register of Historic Places. A "good example" of a fully developed Prairie style house, the building's architect was M. Leo Elliott. It has two stories, is of brick and block construction with a stucco exterior, and includes a hipped roof with eaves and front walls that enclose a raised patio. The home belonged to Henry Leiman (1857-1931), a manufacturer of cigar boxes.

== Additional sources and external links ==
- Hillsborough County listings at National Register of Historic Places
- Hillsborough County listings at Florida's Office of Cultural and Historical Programs

== Gallery ==
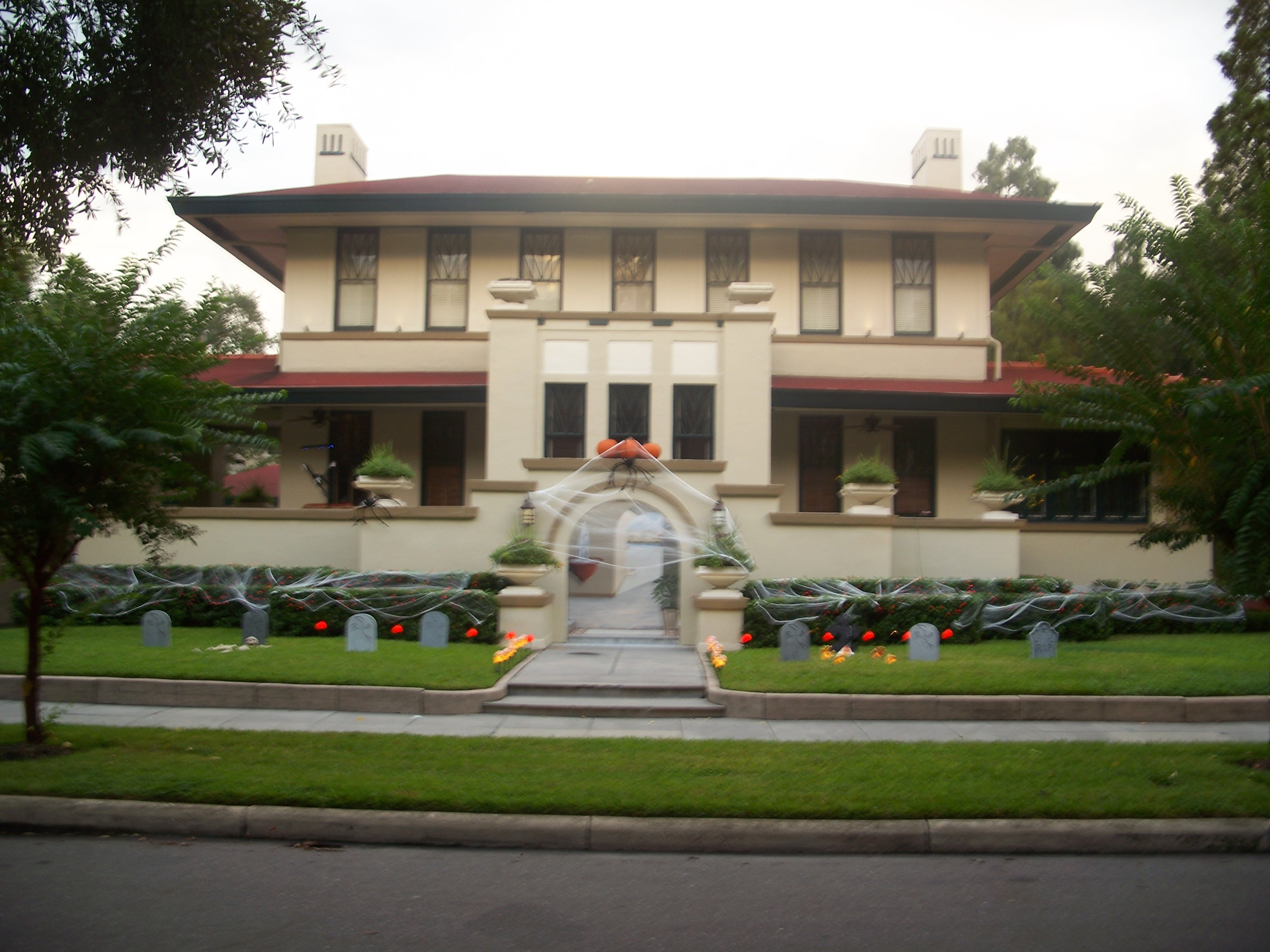

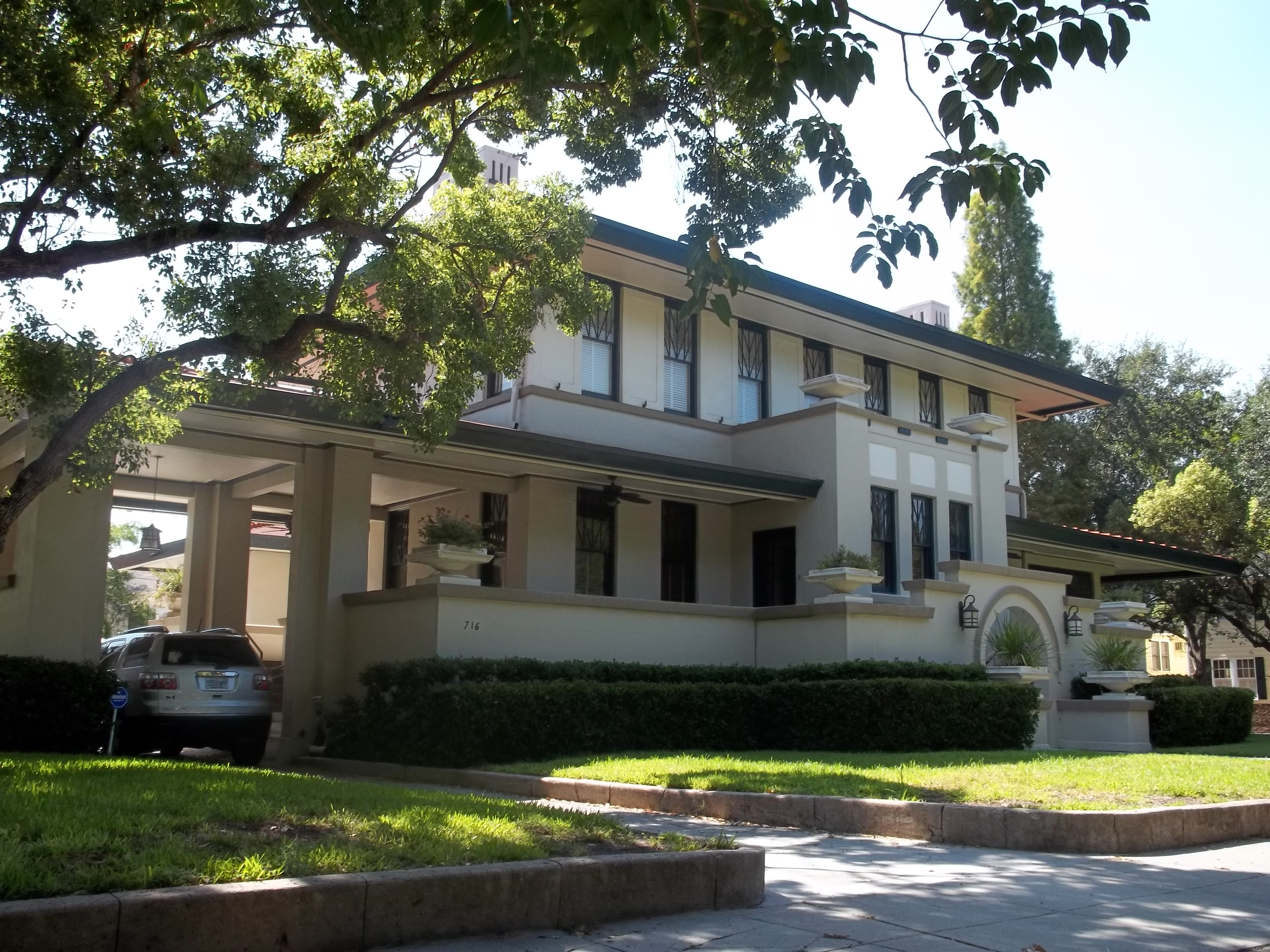

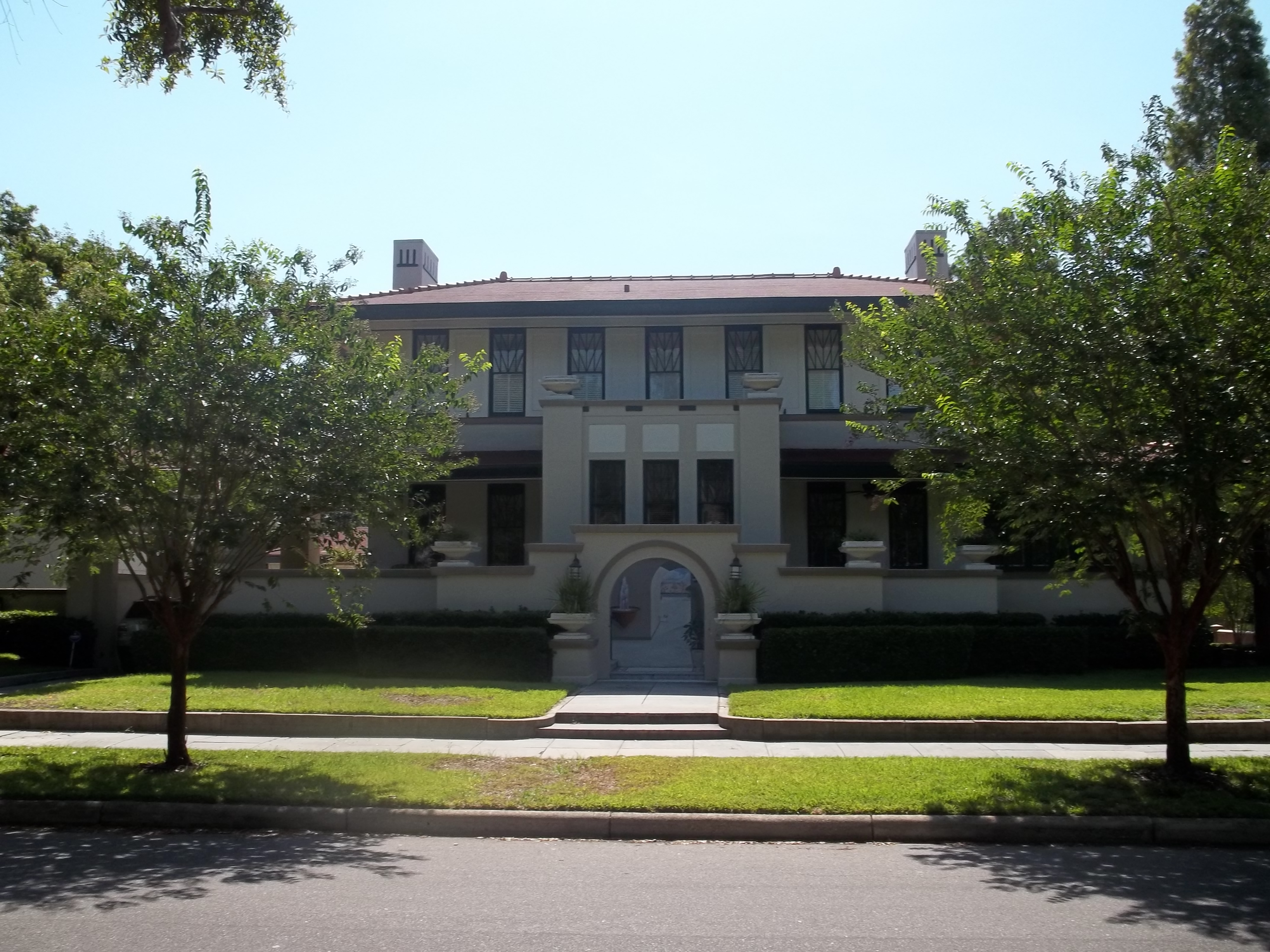
