= Coe Glade =

American opera singer

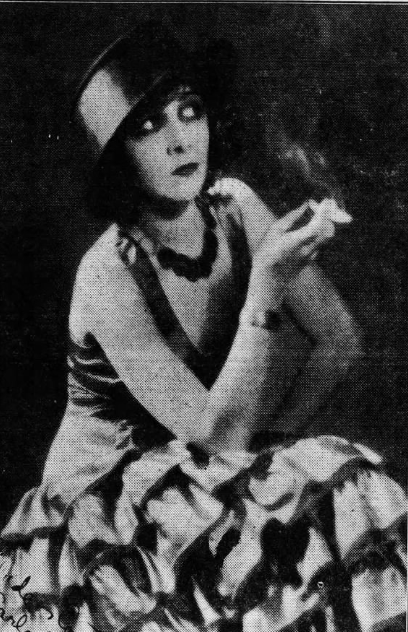
- Coe Glade in costume for "Carmen", from a 1928 newspaper
- Born: Florence Coe Johnston; August 12, 1900; Chicago, Illinois, U.S.
- Died: September 23, 1985 (aged 85); New York, New York, U.S.
- Known for: Mezzo-soprano opera singer

Coe Glade (August 12, 1900 – September 23, 1985), born Florence Coe Johnston, was an American opera singer, best known for singing the title role of Carmen.

== Early life ==
Glade was born in Chicago, and raised in Tampa, Florida, the daughter of Ira William Johnston and Mabel Caroline Albrecht Johnson. Her parents divorced in 1907. Her stepfather was Frederick Glade, who died in 1917.

== Career ==
Glade sang in the mezzo-soprano and contralto ranges. She began singing professionally in St. Louis, and was discovered by Fortune Gallo. She joined the Chicago Civil Opera Company in 1929. She also sang with the Cincinnati Zoo Opera. "She has been hailed by leading critics as an artist of crystalline quality, possessing not only a gorgeous, rich voice but a brain that thinks, that seeks the composer's innermost thought, that grasps his most delicate subtlety", according to one 1931 report. She sang in the opening program at Radio City Music Hall in 1932 and at the Hiram Walker Canadian Club at the Chicago World's Fair in 1934.

Glade sang the lead role in Carmen more than 2,000 times. Her repertoire also included Amneris in Aida, Delila in Samson and Delilah, and Azucena in Il trovatore. She taught voice students in her later years.

Glade was considered an "exotic" beauty, and her appearance was often reported on, including her hair color, makeup, wardrobe, and jewelry. Her braless performances as Carmen in the 1930s were famous enough to be mentioned in at least one obituary, over fifty years later.

== Personal life ==
Glade lived with her mother until Mabel Glade died in 1959. Coe Glade died in 1985, at the age of 85, at her home in New York City. Her gravesite is in Myrtle Hill Memorial Park in Tampa, Florida.
