= Rosa and Eliana Martínez =

US court case of HIV-infected child to be allowed in the public school

Eliana & Rosa Martinez

Eliana Martínez (September 15, 1981 – November 27, 1989) was an American adoptee who contracted HIV from a blood transfusion as an infant. Her adoptive mother, Rosa Martínez (February 20, 1952 – August 18, 2022), fought for Eliana to be allowed to attend a public school without being isolated from other students by transparent partitions, referred to by Rosa Martínez as a "glass cage". Eliana died of complications from AIDS seven months after winning the right to attend a special education program without being physically isolated from other students.

== Biography ==
=== Early life ===
Eliana Martínez was born prematurely on September 15, 1981, in Bayamón, Puerto Rico. She received thirty-nine blood transfusions in the first four months of life, thereby receiving contaminated blood with HIV from one of them.

Unable to care for Eliana nor her four older siblings, her biological parents were denied custody of her. The first eleven months of her life were spent in the hospital where she was born until she was adopted by Joe and Rosa Martínez. (The couple separated in 1986.) Eliana had multiple handicaps and was mistakenly diagnosed with cerebral palsy until the diagnosis of AIDS-related complex was confirmed; her handicaps were due to the effects of AIDS. She was diagnosed with AIDS-Related Complex in April 1985. Eliana was treated with AZT for two years and later with ddl.

=== Legal challenges to attend school ===
In November 1986, Rosa Martínez sought to have Eliana admitted to Manhattan Exceptional Center, a special school operated by Hillsborough County Public Schools. With a tested IQ of 41, Eliana was classified as a trainable mentally handicapped child. The school district wanted Eliana taught at home out of fear she could transmit HIV to others.

After exhausting the appeals process with the school district, Rosa Martínez filed a legal complaint on September 3, 1987, with the United States District Court for the Middle District of Florida. Judge Elizabeth A. Kovachevich ruled on August 8, 1988, that Eliana could attend the school if isolated by transparent partitions from other students until she was toilet trained and learned to stop sucking her fingers. A notice of appeal was promptly filed and the school district constructed the isolation booth specified in the judge's decision.

On August 25, Judge William Terrell Hodges ruled that Eliana should be tutored at home until the appeal could be heard by the United States Court of Appeals for the Eleventh Circuit.

In December 1988, the Court of Appeals returned the case to Judge Kovachevich, upholding Eliana's right to be placed in the least restrictive environment unless evidence proved that she posed a significant risk to other children. Judge Kovachevich ruled that Eliana could sit at a desk in a classroom without isolation partitions and Eliana attended her first day of school on April 27, 1989. Eliana adjusted to attending school and only four of the 200 students at the school stopped attending.

=== Death and aftermath ===
Eliana Martínez died on November 27, 1989 in Tampa, Florida. She was buried at Myrtle Hill Memorial Park in Tampa, Florida. She has a panel on block 03098 of the NAMES Project AIDS Memorial Quilt.

In March 1991, Rosa Martínez and husband Garth Button became legal guardians for two sisters born with AIDS whose mother had recently died. Following an investigation of allegations that Martínez withheld AIDS treatment from the girls, the Florida Department of Health and Rehabilitative Services removed them from the Martínez-Button household. The couple were cleared, but Rosa and her husband agreed the girls should remain with their foster parents to avoid further disruption of their lives.

Rosa Martínez died on August 18, 2022, at the age of 70, and was buried beside Eliana.
