= Masonic Temple No. 25 =

- Masonic Temple
- U.S. National Register of Historic Places
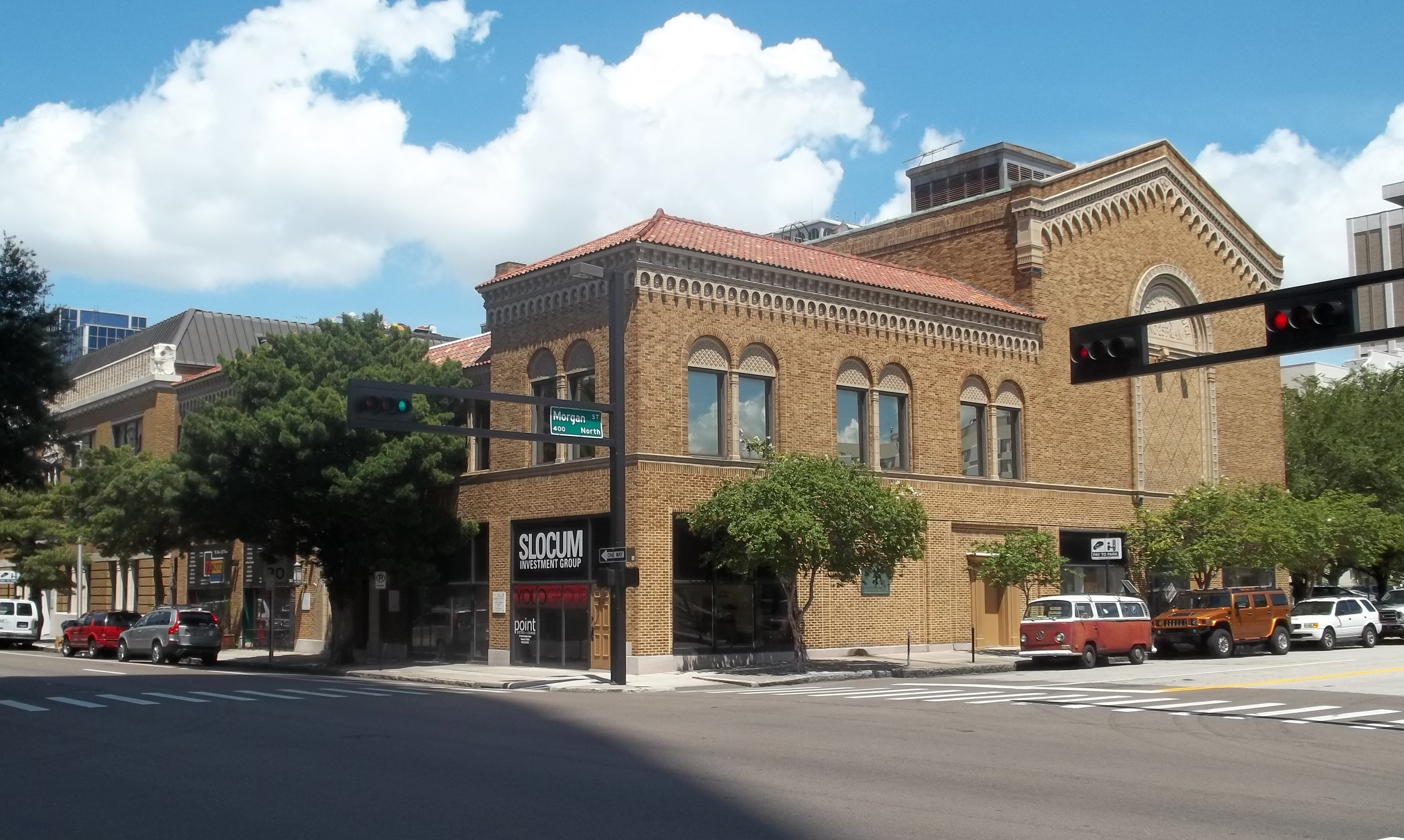

- Location within Florida Location within the United States
- Location: 508 East Kennedy Boulevard, Tampa, Florida
- Coordinates: 27°56′54″N 82°27′4″W
- Area: less than one acre
- Built: 1928
- Architect: M. Leo Elliott
- Architectural style: Mediterranean Revival with Beaux-arts detail
- NRHP reference No.: 86002415
- Added to NRHP: September 11, 1986

The Masonic Temple No. 25, the meeting location of Hillsborough Lodge No. 25, Free and Accepted Masons, is an historic Masonic building located at 508 East Kennedy Boulevard in Tampa, Florida, United States. Erected in 1927, the lodge building was designed by Brother Leo Elliott whose design for it was inspired by three medieval Italian cathedrals.

The cornerstone of the Hillsborough 25's fourth and current lodge building was laid on June 18, 1928, by the Most Worshipful Grand Master of Florida, Cary B. Fish. The lodge was constructed at its current location in downtown Tampa, on the corner of East Kennedy Boulevard and Morgan Street. The first Masonic Lodge meeting in the new temple was called on February 19, 1929. On September 11, 1986, it was added to the U.S. National Register of Historic Places.

The building includes a large dining room, kitchen, officer offices, library, conference room, lounge area, and lodge room. The lodge room is adorned with a 40 ft high, hand painted ceiling, and accommodates up to 450 Masons and visitors. The lodge rents out the three street-side rental units on the first floor to businesses.

Lodge members have included:

- Joseph Robles, who led the defense against Spanish invasion along what is now Bayshore Boulevard.
- Abe Maas, one of the principal owners of Maas Brothers in downtown Tampa.
- Vivian Gaither, a leader in Tampa for whom Gaither High School is named.

== Gallery ==
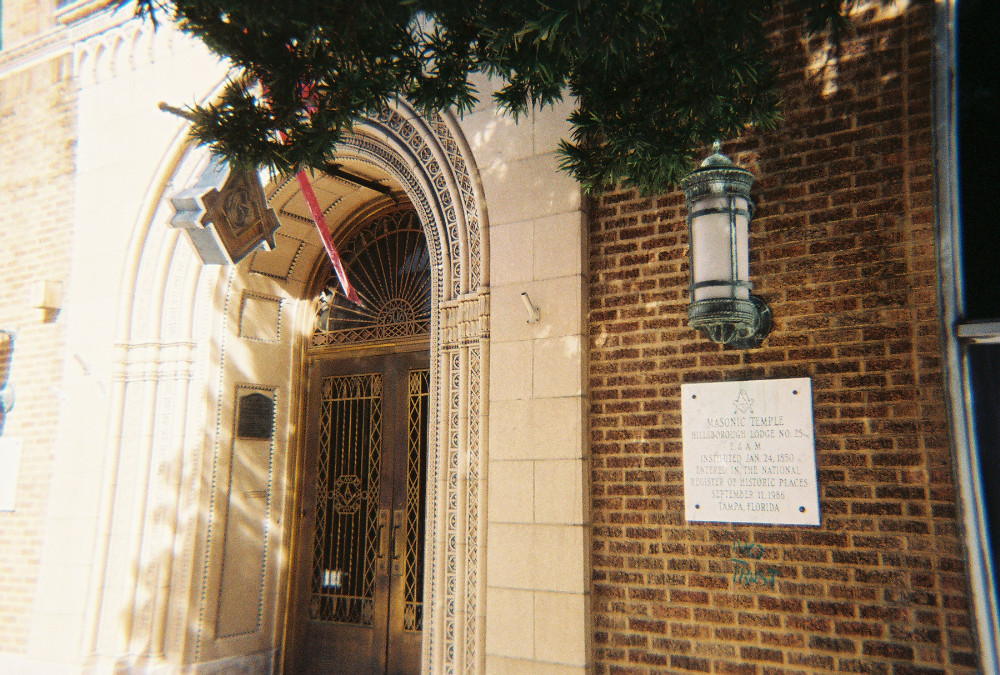
Entrance to the Masonic Temple with historic plaque

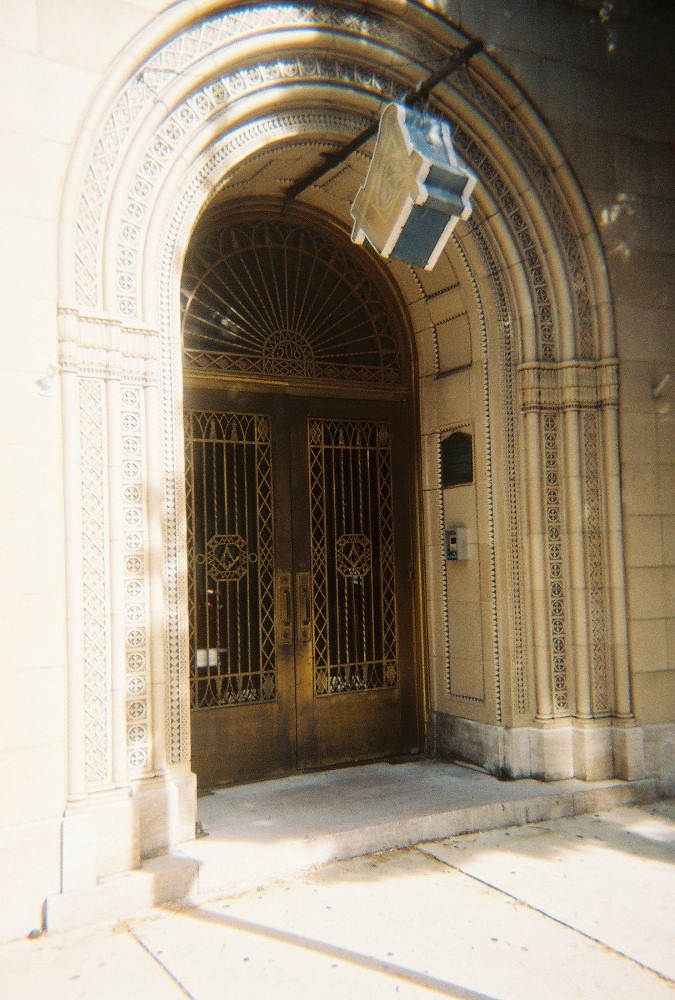
Entrance to the Masonic Temple
