= Bradenton Bank and Trust Company Building =

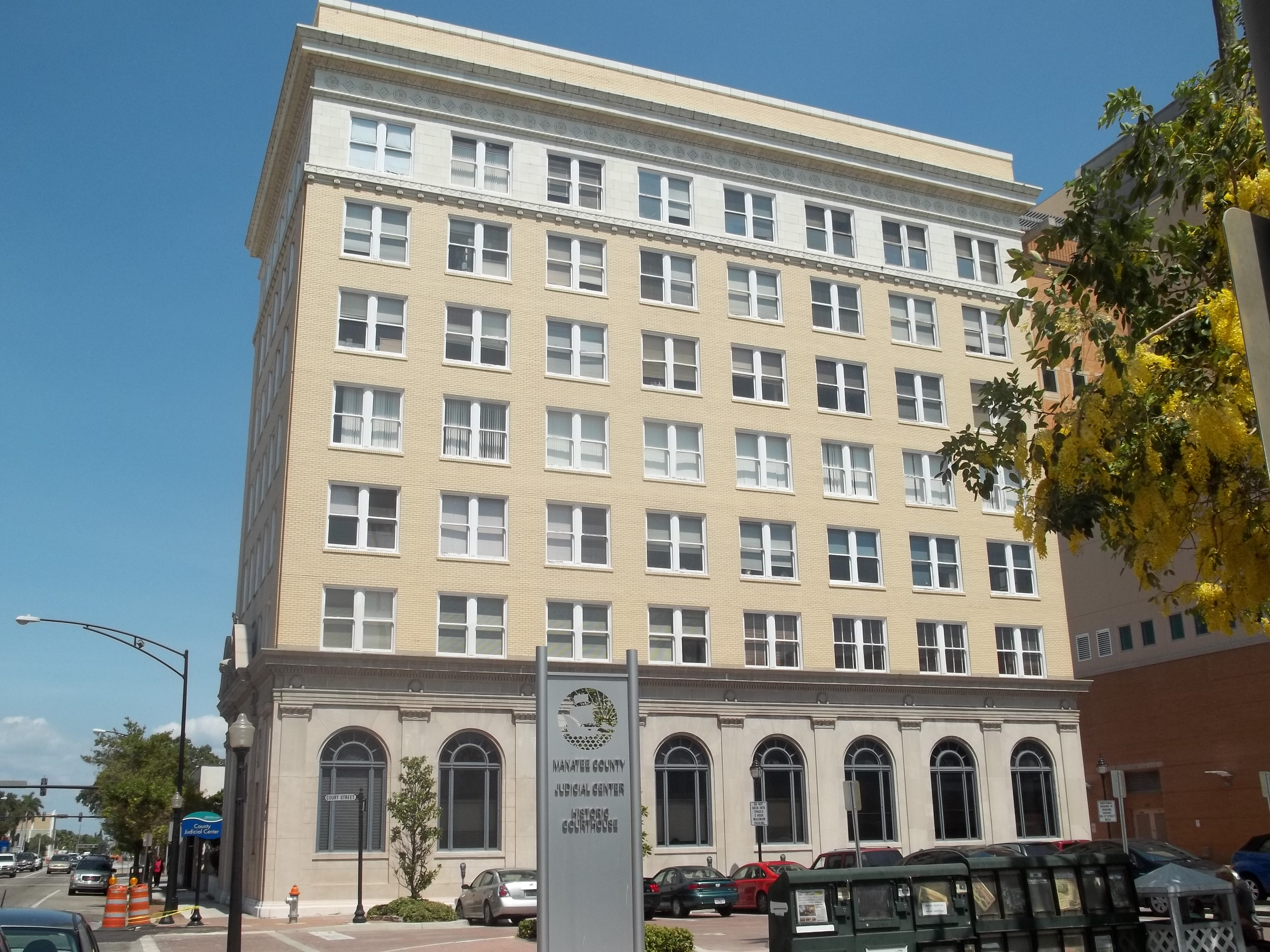
- Western façade of building
- Interactive map of the Bradenton Bank and Trust Company Building area
- Alternative names: Professional Building

General information
- Architectural style: Chicago School, Classical Revival
- Location: 1023 Manatee Avenue; Bradenton, Florida, United States
- Coordinates: 27°29′43″N 82°34′21″W
- Current tenants: Grimes Goebel Grimes Hawkins Gladfelter & Galvano
- Construction started: 1925
- Completed: 1926
- Opened: February 22, 1926
- Cost: $250,000
- Client: Bradenton Bank and Trust Company

Technical details
- Structural system: Steel reinforced commercial building
- Floor count: 7

Design and construction
- Architect: Malachi Leo Elliott

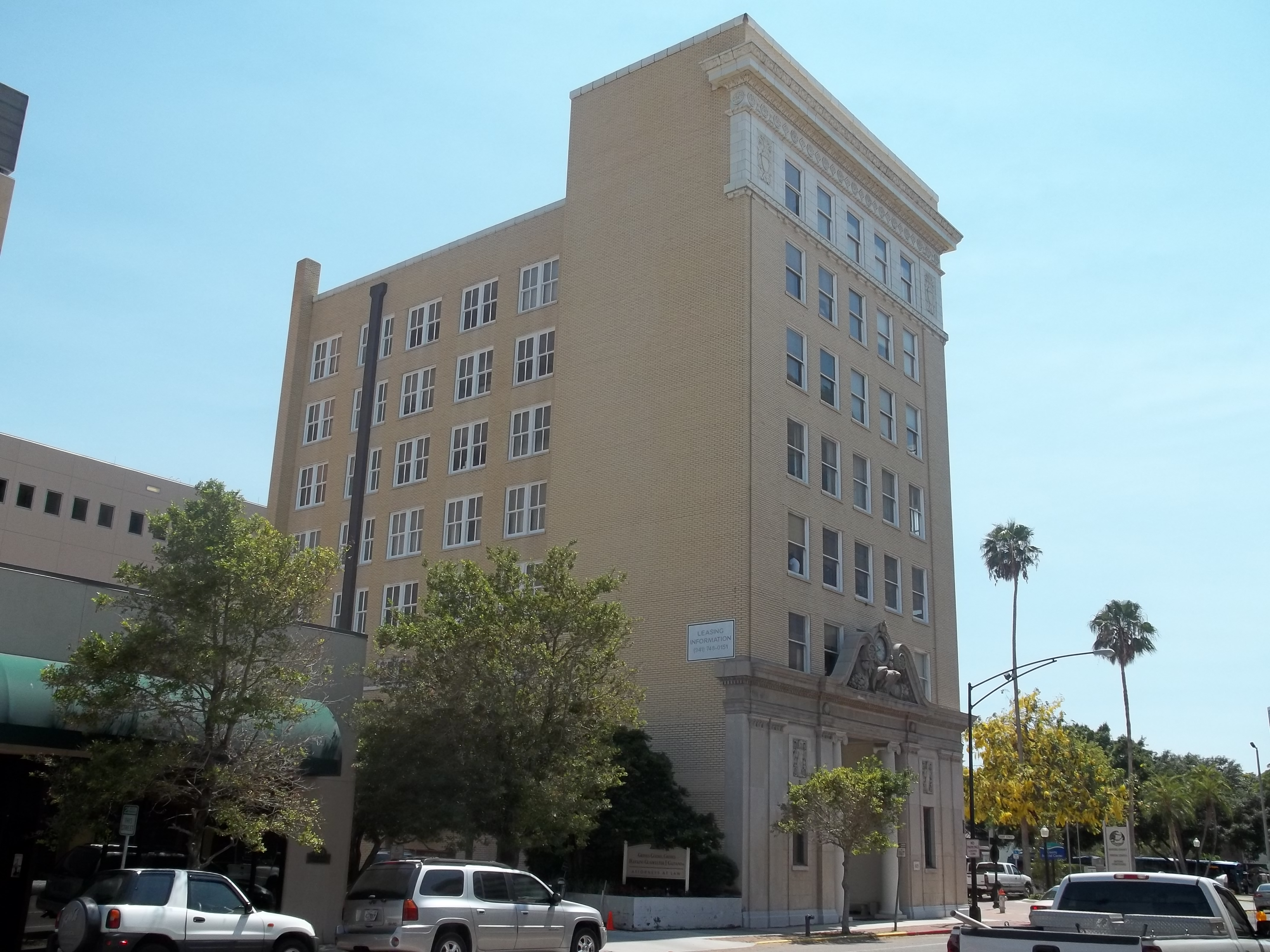
Front (northern) and eastern facades

The Bradenton Bank and Trust Company, built during the height of the Florida land boom and now known as the Professional Building, is a historic 7-story commercial building located at 1023 Manatee Avenue West, just east of the Manatee County Courthouse in Bradenton, Manatee County, Florida, United States.

== History ==
Designed in the Commercial or Chicago School style of architecture with Classical Revival touches, it features the three tiers typical of the Commercial style: an ornate main floor exterior, plain middle story exteriors and a not quite as plain top floor crowned with a cornice.

When the building opened on February 22, 1926, the bank occupied the ground floor and the upper floors were occupied by about 90 commercial tenants. By 1929, however, there were only 20 tenants left. The bank failed in 1933 and the ground floor became retail space and gradually the upper floors were reoccupied by doctors, dentists, lawyers and accountants and other professionals. Sharp's Drug Store was a longtime occupant of the ground floor. It was the tallest commercial building in Manatee County from completion until 1986 when the 12-story Bradenton Financial Center surpassed it. Today the building is owned by the law firm which occupies most of its space. The ground floor exterior has been restored to its original appearance. It is included in a walking tour of downtown Bradenton and is included in the city's master list of historic buildings.
