= Osprey School =

- U.S. National Register of Historic Places
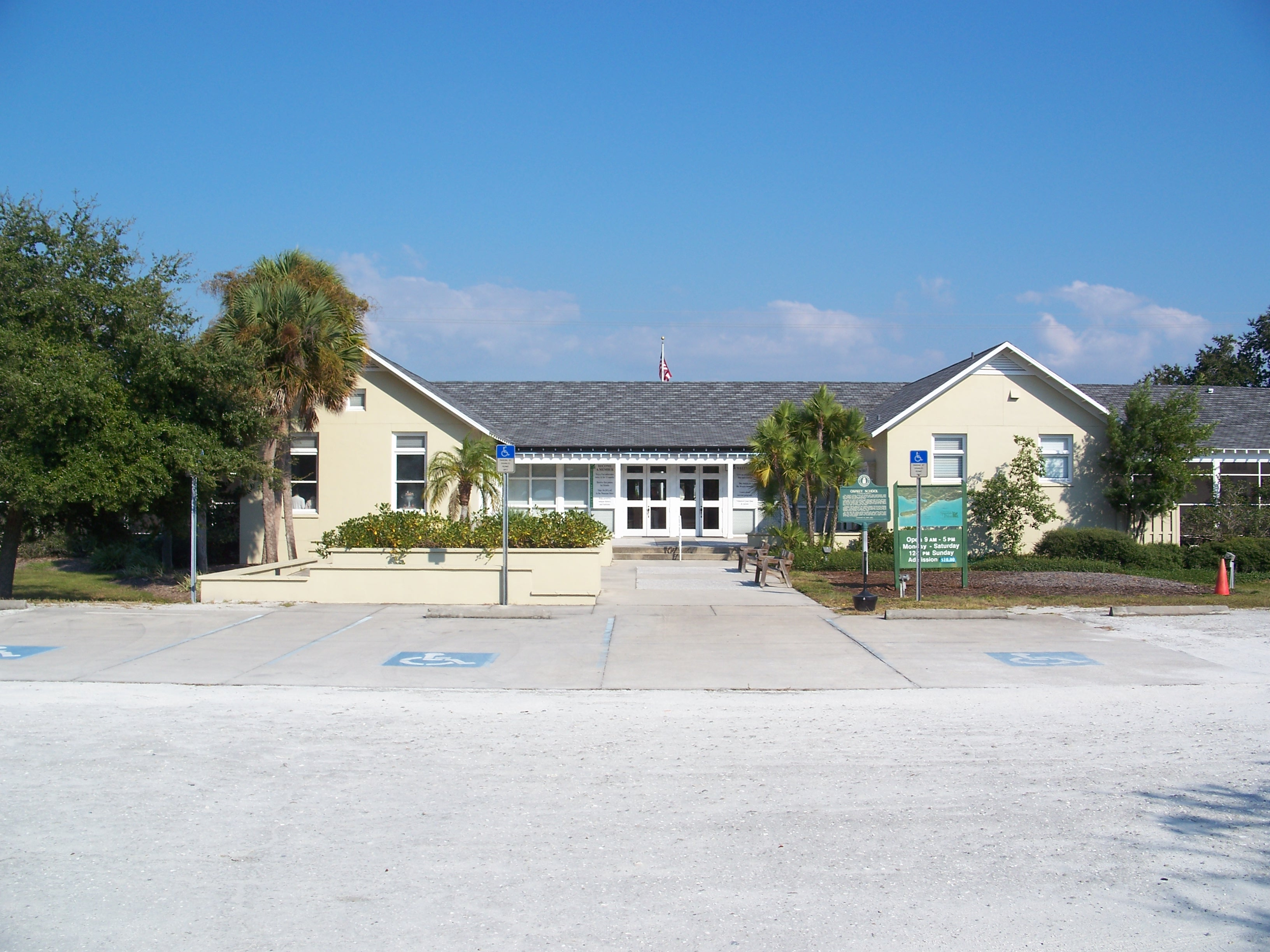

- Location within Florida Location within the United States
- Location: Osprey, Florida
- Coordinates: 27°12′05″N 82°29′26″W
- Architect: M. Leo Elliott
- Architectural style: Masonry Vernacular
- NRHP reference No.: 94000707
- Added to NRHP: July 15, 1994

The Osprey School is a historic school built in 1926 in Osprey, Florida. Described as being in a masonry vernacular architectural style, the school is located at 337 North Tamiami Trail. The entrance is flanked by two wings of classrooms. On July 15, 1994, it was added to the U.S. National Register of Historic Places. The building was designed by noted Tampa architect M. Leo Elliott. It is now part of the Historic Spanish Point museum complex.

The Osprey School served the Osprey and Vamo communities from 1927 through June 1976. The land where the school resides is part of the 145-acre homestead of John and Eliza Webb, who settled in Spanish Point in 1867. When it became apparent that the community needed a new school, the land was sold to the school board for $10 on December 28, 1926, by Mabel Webb Johnson and her husband, Ernest. The school was designed by Tampa architect M. Leo Elliot. His plan for the Spanish Colonial Revival-style building recognized the importance of cross-ventilation in a hot and humid climate. The layout, with all the classrooms in a line, took advantage of cross breezes for cooling and an exterior hallway shaded classrooms from the afternoon sun. The one-story, six-classroom school initially served grades one through nine and was constructed by Becchetti and Romersa for $19,000.

The school opened in 1927 but, like most Sarasota County schools, had to close for several months in 1933 because of a lack of revenue. During difficult economic times, parental and teacher involvement sustained Osprey School. After World War II, when the county experience renewed economic growth, the school was rewired in 1959 to allow for air conditioning and heating units. Osprey School survived without further improvement until June 1976, when it closed. Students in the area transferred to schools north or south of the community. In 1994, the building was listed on the National Register of Historic Places. The building was used as the School Board’s Teacher Education until 1989. The building remained empty until 1995 when it became the visitor center for Historic Spanish Point, and the Sarasota County library system turned a part of the schoolhouse into the Osprey Public Library in 2011.
