= Lou Stovall =

American artist (1937–2023)

- Born: January 1, 1937; Athens, Georgia, U.S.
- Died: March 3, 2023 (aged 86); Washington D.C., U.S.
- Education: Howard University
- Known for: Printmaking
- Spouse: Di Bagley Stovall
- Children: 2

Luther McKinley Stovall (January 1, 1937 – March 3, 2023) was an American visual artist who resided in Washington, D.C.

== Education ==
Stovall grew up in Springfield, MA and he studied at Howard University, where he earned a BFA in 1965. He also received a Doctor of Fine Arts Honoris Causa, from the Corcoran School of the Arts and Design (now part of George Washington University), in Washington, D.C. in 2001. He lived and worked in Washington, D.C. from 1962 on.

== Work ==
Stovall was most often associated with drawing and silkscreen printmaking. In 1968 he founded Workshop, Inc., initially a community studio which subsequently grew into a professional printmaking facility used by many artists, including Josef Albers, Peter Blume, Alexander Calder, Gene Davis, Sam Gilliam, Jacob Kainen, Jacob Lawrence, Robert Mangold, Mathieu Mategot, Pat Buckley Moss, Paul Reed, Reuben Rubin, Di Bagley Stovall, and James L. Wells. In a 1998 New York Times profile of Stovall, American artist Jacob Lawrence described him as “a craftsman who is also an artist.”

Stovall's art has been exhibited in many galleries, art centers, and museums. Additionally, he has been the recipient of several high-profile art commissions. In 1982, First Lady Nancy Reagan commissioned Stovall to design that year's Independence Day invitation for the White House. Subsequently, in 1986 Washington, D.C. Mayor Marion Barry commissioned Stovall to create a work for the city's host committee for the 1988 Democratic National Convention.

His work is in the collection of several museums, including the Smithsonian American Art Museum in Washington, DC, The National Gallery of Art, Washington, D.C., The National Endowment of the Arts, Washington, D.C., The Phillips Collection, Washington, D.C., The John and Mable Ringling Museum of Art, Sarasota, Florida, the Corcoran Gallery of Art, Washington, D.C., the Bristol Museum in Bristol, R.I., the Bayly Art Museum in Charlottesville, VA, the Studio Museum in Harlem, the DC Commission on the Arts and Humanities, and the Georgia Museum of Art.

The Washington City Paper once described him as "legendary in his adopted hometown of Washington" while the Washington Post noted in 2020 that "Veteran Washington artist Lou Stovall has been making silk-screen prints for so long that he’s begun to see them as a sort of natural resource."

== Personal life and death ==
Lou Stovall married artist Di Stovall in 1971. They had one son Will Stovall who is a painter. Stovall also had a daughter, Calea, from an earlier marriage to Elizabeth Wilson, which ended in divorce. Lou Stovall died from heart failure at his home in Washington D.C., on March 3, 2023, at the age of 86.

== Awards ==
2022 – Larry D. and Brenda A. Thompson Award, Georgia Museum of Art, University of Georgia

2017 – Distinction in Artistic Achievement, DC History Center's Making DC History Awards

2005 – Printmaker of Distinction Award, Southern Graphics Conference, Washington, D.C.

1985 – Mayor's Art Award for Excellence in an Artistic Discipline, Washington, D.C.

1979 – Washingtonian of the Year, Washingtonian Magazine, Washington, D.C.

1972–1974 – The National Endowment for the Arts, Workshop Grants

1972 – The National Endowment for the Arts, Individual Artist Fellowship Grant

1968–1974 – Stern Family Fund Grant

== Exhibitions ==
2022 – The Phillips Collection

2022 – The Georgia Museum of Art

2022 – The Kreeger Museum

2020 – The Columbus Museum, Columbus, GA

2012 – American University Museum at the Katzen Arts Center, Washington, DC

2010 – Addison/Ripley Gallery, Washington, DC

2009 – Granary Gallery, West Tisbury, Massachusetts

2008 – The City Gallery at Waterfront Park, Charleston, SC

2008 – Prada Gallery, Washington, D.C.

2007 – Washington Printmakers Gallery, Washington, D.C.

2007 – African American Museum, Dallas, Texas

2007 – Howard University, Washington, D.C.

2004 – Strathmore Hall Arts Center, Bethesda, Maryland

2004 – Harmony Hall Regional Center, Fort Washington, Maryland

2001 – Howard University, Washington, D.C.

1998 – Noel Gallery, Charlotte, North Carolina
