= Mise en Place (restaurant) =

Restaurant in Florida, United States

Coordinates: 27°56′41″N 82°27′55″W

- Interactive map of Mise en Place

Restaurant information
- Established: 1986
- Location: Tampa, Florida, United States

Mise en Place is a restaurant in Tampa, Florida, the core of a group of spin-off restaurants in the area. Named for the French term mise en place, the restaurant started in 1986 as a small catering business. Maryann Ferenc and chef Marty Blitz began the business, now a group of restaurant/ cafes offering full-service modern American cuisine as well as event catering. Mise en Place is located in Tampa architect M. Leo Elliott's 1925 plaza near the University of Tampa (Elliot also created Tampa City Hall (1915) and Ybor City's Cuban Club (1918)

Mise en Place is located in Grand Central Place, including a banquet hall in what was once Lafayette Bank. The restaurant is part of a three-story building beside Snow Park, "once considered the world’s smallest city park by the Guinness World Records", along Kennedy Boulevard just west of Tampa's business district. Tampa architect M. Leo Elliott designed the 1925 plaza, built originally as an office building for physicians.

The Mise en Place restaurant business also operates the SONO Cafe at the Tampa Museum of Art and is under contract for a restaurant at the Tampa International Airport. Mise en Place offers a menu "so diverse it is daunting to read while trying to hold a conversation".

Past spin-offs included Mise en Place Market, a take-out version aiming to serve the "home-meal replacement niche", 442, and the restaurant Mojo on Davis Island.

Tampa Mayoral candidate Frank Sanchez held his runoff election victory party at the restaurant in 2003. A Democratic National Committee fundraiser with David Plouffe was held at the restaurant in 2009. Ference's reaction to Obama's plans for small business investment was covered in a 2009 Bloomberg Businessweek article.

== See also ==
- List of restaurants in Tampa, Florida
