= Di Stovall =

American artist

Di Bagley Stovall
- Born: 1947; Columbus, Georgia
- Spouse: Lou Stovall
- Children: 1
- Website: https://www.dibagleystovall.com/

Di Bagley Stovall (born 1947) is an American screenprint artist. Her work is included in the collections of the Smithsonian American Art Museum and the Columbus Museum, Columbus, Georgia. She married print-maker Lou Stovall in 1971.

Exhibits of her work include, Through Their Eyes: The Art of Lou and Di Stovall (1982) and The Art of Lou and Di Stovall (1988) at the Smithsonian's Anacostia Community Museum. According to a 1988 Washington Post article, "The Stovalls have been working jointly and severally in Washington for many years now, and through the Corcoran and a number of studios have inspired and trained a whole generation of young artists."
