= Myrtle Hill Memorial Park =

Cemetery in Hillsborough, Florida, US

Coordinates: 27°58′47″N 82°24′40″W

Myrtle Hill Memorial Park is a cemetery in Tampa, Florida, in the United States. It was established in 1917, and is located at 4207 East Lake Avenue. It is owned by Dignity Memorial.

== Notable graves ==
- Gen. Paul DeWitt Adams (1906–1987), US Army general, commanded United States Third Army
- Doyle E. Carlton (1885–1972), 25th Governor of Florida
- Sam Melville Gibbons (1920–2012), US Congressman 1963–1997
- Coe Glade (1900–1985), opera singer
- Gen. John J. Hennessey (1921–2001), US Army general, commanded the 101st Airborne Division in the Vietnam War
- Dennis Hoey (1893–1960), cinema actor
- Dave Lewis (1954–2020), professional football player
- Henry King (1886–1982), film director
- Wallace O. Stovall, Sr. (1891–1966), publisher of The Tampa Tribune
- Ildebrando Zacchini (1868–1948), circus entertainer
- Rosa Martínez and Eliana Martínez (1952-2022) and (1981-1989), HIV/AIDS activists.
