= Stovall House =

Historic house in Florida, United States

- U.S. National Register of Historic Places
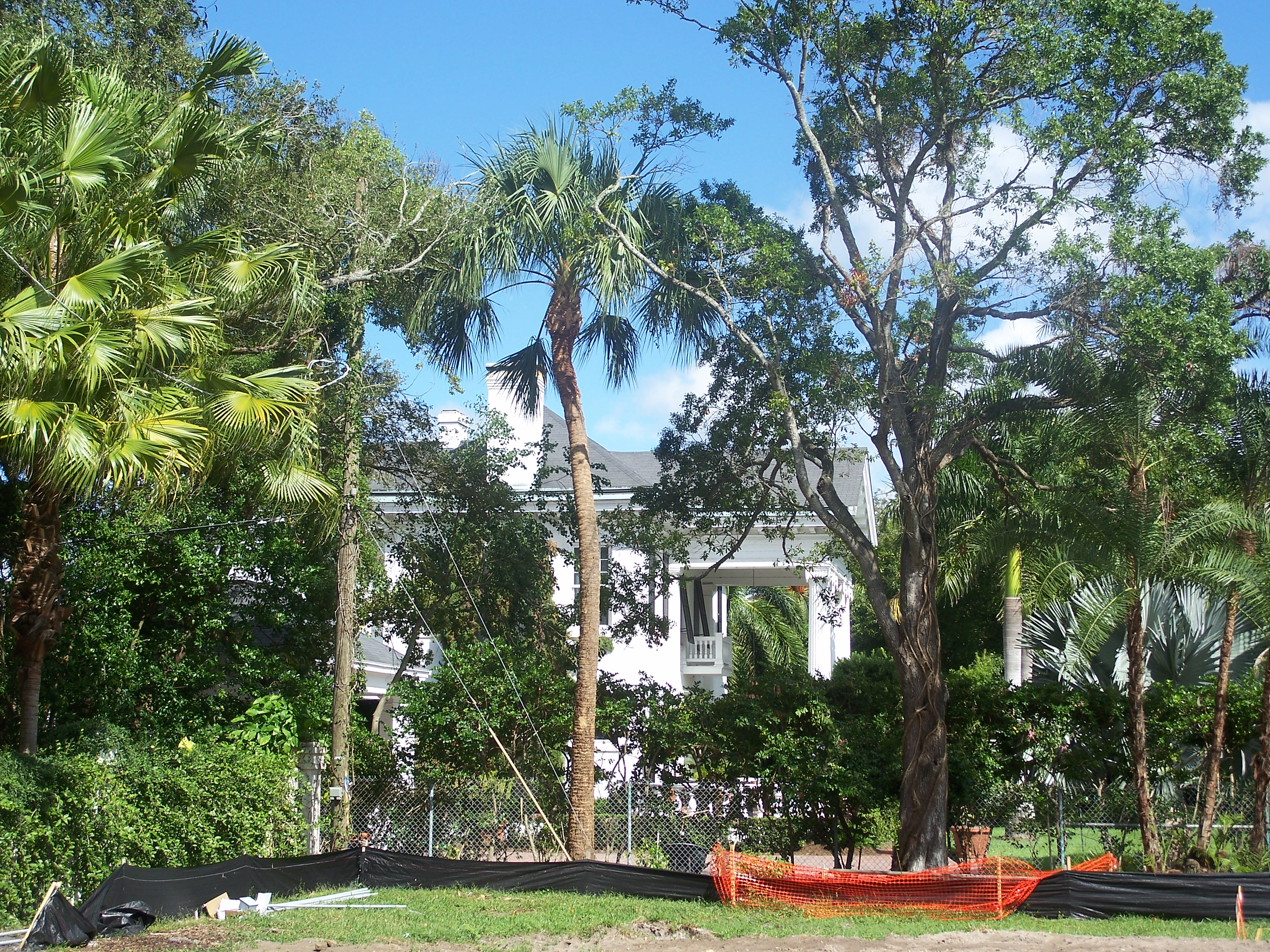

- Location within Florida Location within the United States
- Location: Tampa, Florida
- Coordinates: 27°53′47″N 82°29′24″W
- Built: 1909
- Architectural style: Classical Revival
- NRHP reference No.: 74000637
- Added to NRHP: September 4, 1974

The Stovall House is a historic home in Tampa, Florida. It is located at 4621 Bayshore Boulevard. On September 4, 1974, it was added to the U.S. National Register of Historic Places.

== See also ==
- Wallace Stovall

== References and external links ==
- Hillsborough County listings at National Register of Historic Places
- Hillsborough County listings at Florida's Office of Cultural and Historical Programs
