= Wallace Stovall =

Wallace Oliver Stovall Sr. (December 14, 1891 – May 19, 1966) was the publisher of the Tampa Tribune. The Wallace Stovall building, built in 1926 according to designs by Tampa architect B. Clayton Bonfoey, was located at 416 Tampa Street and Lafayette Street (309 North Morgan Street). It was used as a Works Progress Administration (WPA) Headquarters during the Great Depression of the 1930s and was eventually demolished.

His father Col. Wallace F. Stovall was an editor at the Tribune in 1910.

Stovall was married to Doris Knight Stovall. He was a FL Y2 USNRF World War I. His children included Wallace Oliver Stovall (1919–2012). He also has a grandson named Wallace O. Stovall III.

== Stovall House ==
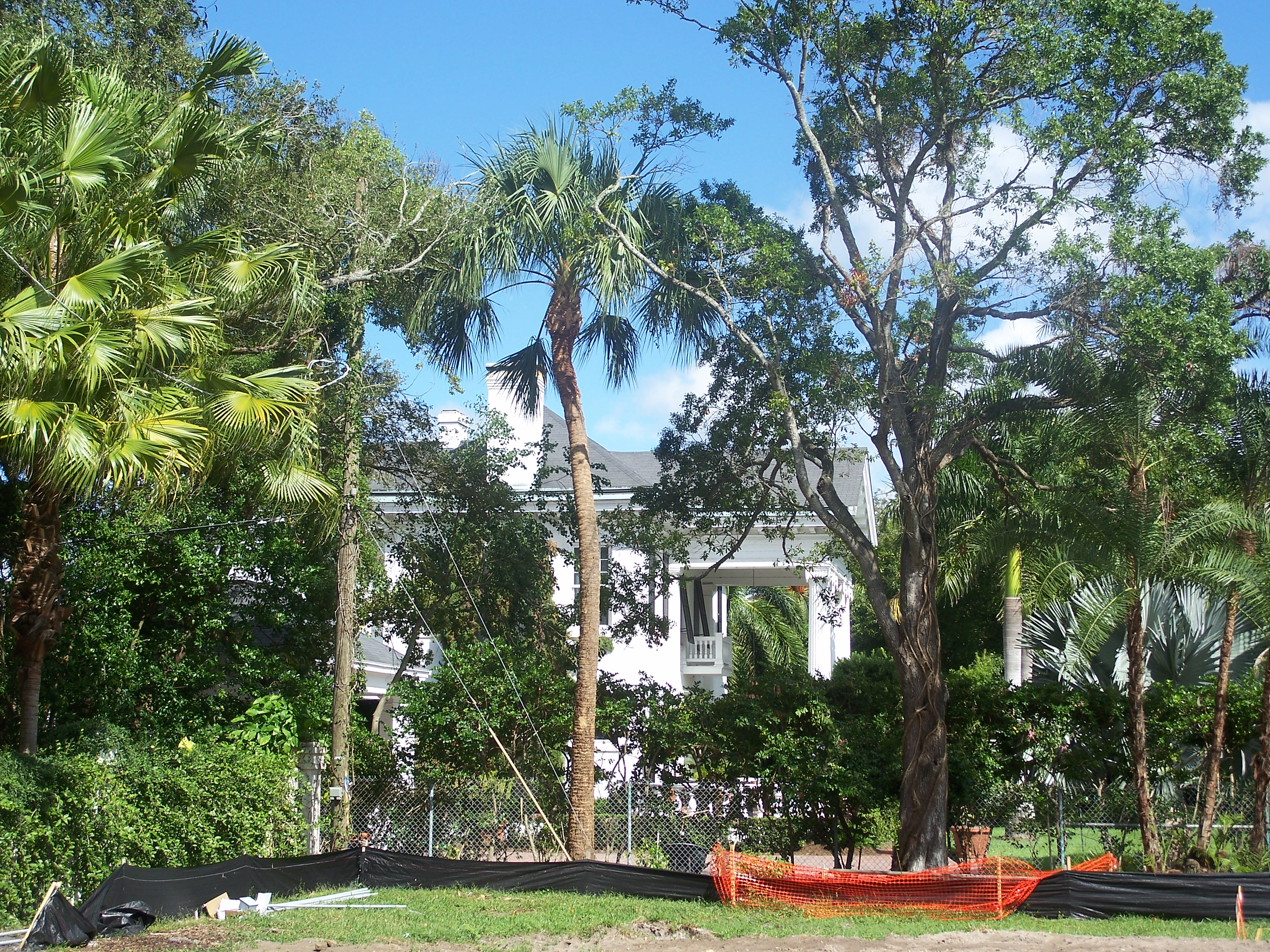
Stovall House in Tampa

The Stovall House is the historic home in Tampa, Florida, that his father acquired in 1915. It is located at 4621 Bayshore Boulevard (Tampa, Florida). On September 4, 1974, it was added to the U.S. National Register of Historic Places. There was also a Wallace Stovall III.
