= DeSoto County Courthouse (Florida) =

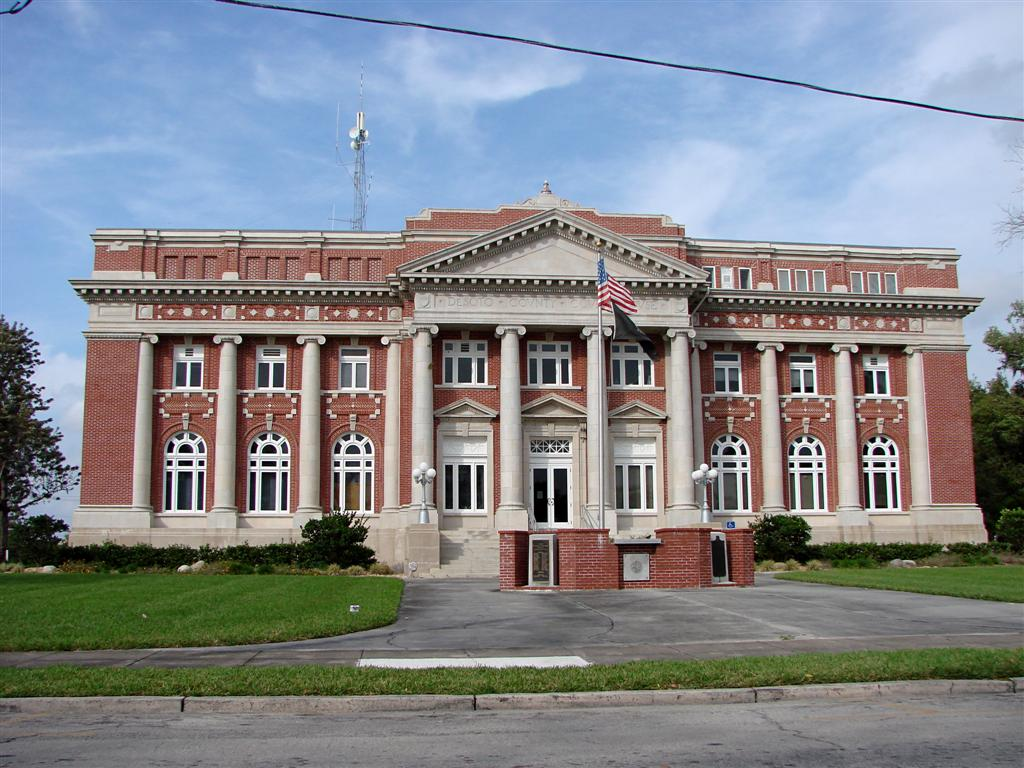
- DeSoto County Courthouse
- Interactive map of the DeSoto County Courthouse area

General information
- Architectural style: Classical Revival
- Location: Arcadia, Florida, United States
- Coordinates: 27°12′53″N 81°51′30″W
- Construction started: 1912
- Completed: 1913, restored in 1976
- Client: DeSoto County

Technical details
- Structural system: redbrick

Design and construction
- Architect: Bonfoey & Elliott of Tampa
- Engineer: Builder: Read-Parker Company

The DeSoto County Courthouse is an historic redbrick courthouse building located at 115 East Oak Street in Arcadia, Florida. Designed by architects Bonfoey & Elliott of Tampa in the Classical Revival style, it was built in 1912-1913 by the Read-Parker Construction Company to serve as DeSoto County's third courthouse and the second one built in Arcadia. It was restored in 1976 and is a contributing property in the Arcadia Historic District.

The building was designed by the Tampa architectural firm of Bonfoey & Elliott. In 1989, the DeSoto County Courthouse was listed in A Guide to Florida's Historic Architecture, published by the University of Florida Press.
