= List of county roads in Sarasota County, Florida =

- County road shields used in Florida

Highway names
- Interstates: Interstate X (I-X)
- US Highways: U.S. Highway X (US X)
- State: State Road X (SR X)
- County: County Road X (CR X)

System links
- County roads in Florida; County roads in Sarasota County

The following is a list of county roads in Sarasota County, Florida.

== County Road 72 ==
County Road 72
- Location: Siesta Key
- Length: 1.0 mi (1.6 km)

County Road 72 is the county-controlled segment of Stickney Point Road connecting to Siesta Key.

== County Road 72A ==
County Road 72A
- Location: South Sarasota–Ridge Wood Heights–South Gate Ridge–Bee Ridge
- Length: 7.3 mi (11.7 km)

County Road 72A (CR 72A) is Proctor Road through South Sarasota and Bee Ridge.

== County Road 610 ==
County Road 610
- Location: Sarasota
- Length: 2.0 mi (3.2 km)

County Road 610 (CR 610) is University Parkway between US 41 and I 75 on the north side of Sarasota near Sarasota–Bradenton International Airport.

== County Road 683 ==
County Road 683
- Location: North Sarasota
- Length: 1.5 mi (2.4 km)

County Road 683 (CR 683) runs along portions of Tuttle Avenue and Martin Luther King Jr. Way just northeast of Sarasota. It runs along Tuttle Avenue from SR 780 (Fruitville Road) north for 1.5 miles to Martin Luther King Jr. Way. It then turns west along Martin Luther King Jr. Way another mile to US 301. The route was previously a spur of SR 683, a designation which remains the hidden designation of US 301. Both Tuttle Avenue and Martin Luther King Jr. Way continue beyond the limits of CR 683 without designations.

== County Road 683A ==
County Road 683A
- Location: Sarasota
- Length: 0.6 mi (970 m)

County Road 683A (CR 683A) is the designation previously applied to Airport Circle from University Parkway, then east on Rental Car Road and north on Bradenton Road. The route is now controlled by Sarasota–Bradenton International Airport. The full route of Bradenton Road and 15th Street in Manatee County was the original alignment of SR 683. US 301 was extended south to Sarasota via SR 683 in 1953 with US 301/SR 683 running on a new alignment to the east from the Manatee/Sarasota County line south and entering Sarasota along Washington Boulevard. Bradenton Road was then designated SR 683A. Bradenton Road's connection with 15th Street/301 Boulevard (previously US 301/SR 683) to the north in Manatee County has since been severed due to extensions of the airport's Runway 14/32.

== County Road 758 ==
County Road 758
- Location: Siesta Key–Sarasota–Bee Ridge
- Length: 5.8 mi (9.3 km)

County Road 758 (CR 758) is Midnight Pass Road, Higel Avenue, and Siesta Drive on Siesta Key before crossing to the mainland in Sarasota. In Sarasota, it then South Osprey Avenue and Bay Road to US 41.

== County Road 762 ==
County Road 762
- Location: Laurel–Nokomis–Venice
- Length: 5.8 mi (9.3 km)

County Road 762 (CR 762) is Laurel Road through Laurel and the northeast section of Venice. The route is signed only at its interchange with Interstate 75.

=== Route description ===
Laurel Road begins at Bayshore Road in Laurel. It heads east as a two-lane road and it intersects US 41 (Tamiami Trail) about half a mile later. From US 41, Laurel Road continues east as a four-lane undivided road. It crosses the Legacy Trail before running along the north side of Nokomis. Laurel Road enters the northeastern section of Venice as it intersects Interstate 75. Beyond Interstate 75, Laurel Road continues east through residential areas before intersecting Jacaranda Boulevard (CR 765). CR 762 terminates a quarter of a mile east of Jacaranda Boulevard at Ciltadella Drive. Though, Laurel Road continues east under maintenance of the city of Venice another 0.75 mile to Venice Myakka River Park.

=== History ===
Laurel Road was a dirt road in its early years. In the 1960s, it was paved and a bridge was built over Shackett Creek which extended the road further east. When Interstate 75 opened through Sarasota County in 1981, Laurel Road initially did not have an interchange with the new freeway. The crossing of the two roadways was upgraded to a full interchange in 1996 and Laurel Road was widened to four lanes.

=== Major intersections ===
Location	mi	km	Destinations	Notes
Laurel	0.0	0.0	Bayshore Road	
Laurel	0.5	0.80	US 41 (South Tamiami Trail / SR 45)	
Venice	3.6	5.8	I-75 (SR 93) – Naples, Tampa	Exit 195 on I-75
Venice	5.5	8.9	CR 765 south (Jacaranda Boulevard)	
Venice	5.8	9.3	Ciltadella Drive	continues east to Venice Myakka River Park
1.000 mi = 1.609 km; 1.000 km = 0.621 mi

== County Road 765 ==
County Road 765
- Location: South Venice–Venice Gardens–Venice
- Length: 7.2 mi (11.6 km)

County Road 765 (CR 765) is Jarcaranda Boulevard just to the east of Venice. The route is signed only at its interchange with Interstate 75.

=== Route description ===
Jacaranda Boulevard begins at an intersection with SR 776 (Englewood Road) in South Venice. Less than a mile later, it intersects with US 41 (Tamiami Trail). It continues north on a winding route crossing Alligator Creek into Venice Gardens. North of Alligator Creek, it passes residential communities and the Jacaranda West Country Club. It intersects Center Road and passes more residential communities before coming to a roundabout with Venice Avenue (CR 772), which runs west to central Venice. A mile north of Venice Avenue, Jacaranda Boulevard comes to an interchange with Interstate 75. North of I-75, Jacaranda Boulevard is reduced to two lanes and continues north. At Border Road, it enters Venice city limits and continues north as a two-lane divided road to its northern terminus at Laurel Road (CR 762).

=== History ===
The first segment of Jacaranda Boulevard built was from Center Road south to Alligator Creek in the 1970s to provide access to the Jacaranda communities.

The road was built from Venice Avenue north to Interstate 75 when I-75 opened in Sarasota County in 1981. This segment was originally known as Everglades Boulevard. Later in the decade, Jacaranda Boulevard was extended north from Center Road to Venice Avenue connecting to Everglades Boulevard (which was renamed as an extension of Jacaranda Bouelvard to make the road continuous).

Jacaranda Boulevard was extended south from Alligator Creek to its current southern terminus at Englewood Road (SR 776) in 1987.

On the north end, Jacaranda Boulevard was extended north from I-75 to Border Road in the 1990s. It was further extended to Laurel Road in 2013.

=== Major intersections ===
Location	mi	km	Destinations	Notes
South Venice	0.0	0.0	SR 776 (Englewood Road)	
South Venice	0.7	1.1	US 41 (South Tamiami Trail / SR 45)	
	2.9	4.7	Center Road	
	4.4	7.1	CR 772 (Venice Avenue)	
	5.2	8.4	I-75 (SR 93) – Naples, Tampa	Exit 193 on I-75
Venice	6.0	9.7	Border Road	
Venice	7.2	11.6	CR 762 (Laurel Road)	
1.000 mi = 1.609 km; 1.000 km = 0.621 mi

== County Road 771 ==
County Road 771
- Location: North Port
- Length: 7.2 mi (11.6 km)

County Road 771 (CR 771) is Sumter Boulevard in North Port. Despite being signed as a county route at its interchange with Interstate 75, the entire route of Sumter Boulevard from US 41 (Tamiami Trail) to Tropicaire Boulevard is maintained by the city of North Port.

=== Major intersections ===
Location	mi	km	Destinations	Notes
North Port	0.0	0.0	US 41 (South Tamiami Trail / SR 45)	
North Port	2.5	4.0	Price Boulevard	
North Port	4.6	7.4	I-75 (SR 93) – Naples, Tampa	Exit 182 on I-75
North Port	5.6	9.0	Tropicaire Boulevard	
1.000 mi = 1.609 km; 1.000 km = 0.621 mi

== County Road 772 ==
County Road 772
- Location: Venice
- Length: 3.7 mi (6.0 km)

County Road 772 (CR 772) is Venice Avenue, the primary east–west road through Venice.

=== Route description ===
CR 772 begins in Venice at an intersection with US 41 Business (the original Tamiami Trail). Venice Avenue extends from this point west as a city street less than a mile to the Gulf of Mexico at Venice Beach. From its terminus at US 41 Business, CR 772 runs east over the Intracoastal Waterway on Venice Avenue Bridge, a two-lane bascule bridge. Once across the bridge, CR 772 expands to four lanes and intersects US 41. It continues east through Venice and comes to a roundabout with Jacaranda Boulevard (CR 765) less than a mile after leaving Venice city limits. CR 772 terminates at Jacaranda Boulevard, but Venice Avenue continues east without a designation another three miles to the Myakka River.

=== History ===
Venice Avenue was historically two separate roadways on either side of present-day US 41 (which was the southern end of Albee Farm Road before US 41 was rerouted to its current alignment in 1965).

The western 1.5 miles of Venice Avenue from the Gulf of Mexico was a city street when Venice was incorporated in the 1920s. The road from the Myakka River west was originally a separate road known as Venice Farm Road. At Hatchett Creek, Venice Farm Road shifted north a block and ran along present-day Ridgewood Avenue to Venice. Venice Farm Road was originally part of SR 311, but was redesignated as SR 770 as part of the 1945 Florida State Road renumbering. The west end of Venice Farm Road was realigned to connect with Venice Avenue in the late 1950s, making it part of Venice Avenue.

The Intracoastal Waterway was dug through Venice in the late 1960s after the realignment of US 41. In preparation for the construction of the waterway, Venice Avenue was elevated on to the Venice Avenue Bridge, which was built in 1966. Venice Avenue was designated as SR 772 in the early 1970s. It subsequently became CR 772 when it was given to county control.

=== Major intersections ===
Location	mi	km	Destinations	Notes
Venice	0.0	0.0	US 41 Bus. (Tamiami Trail / SR 45)	Venice Avenue continues west as a city street
Venice	0.1– 0.4	0.16– 0.64	Venice Avenue Bridge over Intracoastal Waterway	
Venice	0.7	1.1	US 41 (SR 45A)	
	3.7	6.0	CR 765 (Jacaranda Boulevard)	Venice Avenue continues east as an undesignated county road
1.000 mi = 1.609 km; 1.000 km = 0.621 mi

== County Road 773 ==
County Road 773
- Location: Gulf Gate Estates–South Gate Ridge–Sarasota
- Length: 8.2 mi (13.2 km)

County Road 773 (CR 773) is the unsigned designation for Beneva Road, which runs from a point near Gulf Gate Estates to Sarasota.

=== Route description ===
Beneva Road begins at an intersection with US 41 near the former Sarasota Square Mall on the southeast side of Gulf Gate Estates. It heads north along the eastern edge of Gulf Gate Estates and intersects SR 72 (Clark Road). As it passes Red Bug Slough Preserve, Beneva Road enters South Gate Ridge. It then intersects SR 758 (Bee Ridge Road) 1.5 miles later. North of Bee Ridge Road, Beneva Road runs between Southgate and Sarasota Springs. It then intersects Webber Street and Bahia Vista Street as it continues north. Beneva Road enters Sarasota city limits right after crossing the Legacy Trail. It then intersects SR 780 (Fruitville Road), the primary east–west road through Sarasota. Beneva Road terminates a mile north of Fruitville Road at 17th Street.

=== History ===
The route was previously SR 773.

=== Major intersections ===
Location	mi	km	Destinations	Notes
Gulf Gate Estates	0.0	0.0	US 41 (Tamiami Trail / SR 45)	continues south as Vamo Road
Gulf Gate Estates	2.5	4.0	SR 72 (Clark Road)	
South Gate Ridge	3.5	5.6	CR 72A (Proctor Road)	
South Gate Ridge–Southgate– Sarasota Springs tripoint	4.5	7.2	SR 758 (Bee Ridge Road)	
Southgate–Sarasota Springs line	5.2	8.4	Webber Street	
	6.2	10.0	Bahia Vista Street	
Sarasota	7.2	11.6	SR 780 (Fruitville Road)	
Sarasota	8.2	13.2	17th Street	
1.000 mi = 1.609 km; 1.000 km = 0.621 mi

== County Road 774 ==
County Road 774
- Location: Woodmere–Manasota Key
- Length: 1.8 mi (2.9 km)

County Road 774 (CR 774) is the unsigned designation for Manasota Beach Road running from Woodmere to Manasota Key.

=== Route description ===
CR 774 begins at SR 776 in Woodmere between Venice and Englewood. From here, it runs along Manasota Beach Road west, south, and west to the Intracoastal Waterway. It then crosses the waterway and Lemon Bay on a double-leaf bascule bridge on to Manasota Key. CR 774 terminates 500 feet west of the bridge, though Manasota Beach Road continues south without a designation along Manasota Key.

=== History ===
The route came into existence in the 1920s when the route's first bridge to Manasota Key was built. The Brotherhood of Locomotive Engineers convinced Sarasota County to build the first bridge since they were developing the north end of Manasota Key. The route was designated SR 774 after the 1945 Florida state road renumbering.

The original bridge to Manasota Key was replaced with the current bascule bridge in 1964. The original bridge was replaced due to its age as well as the need for a larger structure since Lemon Bay had become part of the Intracoastal Waterway.

== County Road 775A ==
County Road 775A
- Location: Englewood
- Length: 2.8 mi (4.5 km)

County Road 775A (CR 775A) is the unsigned designation for West Dearborn Street and Old Englewood Road in Englewood.

=== Route description ===
CR 775A begins at an intersection with SR 776 (Indiana Avenue) and CR 777 (East Dearborn Street) in central Englewood. From here, it heads west along West Dearborn Street for less than a mile before turning north along Old Englewood Road. It runs for 2 miles before terminating at SR 776 (Englewood Road).

=== History ===
Old Englewood Road was the original alignment of Englewood Road entering Englewood. Englewood Road, Old Englewood Road, and Dearborn Street were part of the Tamiami Trail prior to the 1930s. It then became SR 311 up until the 1945 Florida State Road renumbering. After the renumbering, it became SR 775, which continued south thorough Englewood along McCall Road with Dearborn Street east becoming SR 777. SR 775 (which became SR 776 in later years) was realigned to run along an extended Indiana Avenue, with the old route becoming Old Englewood Road. Old Englewood Road and East Dearborn Street were then designated SR 775A (and later CR 775A).

== County Road 777 ==
County Road 777
- Location: Englewood–North Port
- Length: 7.7 mi (12.4 km)

County Road 777 (CR 777) is East Dearborn Street and River Road running from Englewood to North Port.

=== Route description ===
CR 777 begins in central Englewood at an intersection with SR 776 (Indiana Avenue). From its terminus, East Dearborn Street is a four-lane divided highway running east through Englewood. The road also runs west of SR 776 as West Dearborn Street, a local road.

Just outside of Englewood at Pine Street, East Dearborn Street becomes River Road and turns northeast as a two-lane road. Near the Myakka State Forest, River Road turns north paralleling the Myakka River and enters North Port. River Road then comes to an intersection with US 41 (Tamiami Trail), where CR 777 becomes SR 777.

=== History ===
The road has been shown on Florida's official transportation maps (formerly known as road maps) as far back as 1917. On the 1917 State Road Department (SRD) Map, the state road spanned Englewood to present-day North Port. The road was a portion of "Road Number 12" as designated by the State Road Department, a precursor to Florida Department of Transportation (FDOT).

The road from Englewood to North Port at present-day Playmore Road was an early alignment of the Tamiami Trail (US 41) along with Englewood Road (via Old Englewood Road) to the northwest. The current route of US 41 from North Port to South Venice was built in the 1930s, bypassing Englewood. The route was then designated SR 311, which served as a loop of US 41 spanning from Englewood to North Port and back northwest to Venice.

After the 1945 Florida State Road renumbering, the route was designated SR 777, which spanned from SR 775 in Englewood to US 41 in North Port, then northwest paralleling the Myakka River to Venice Avenue (known then as Venice Farm Road). The portion of SR 777 north of US 41 was transferred to the county sometime in the 1950s (though it was transferred back to the state in 2018). The southern portion from US 41 to SR 775 was transferred to the county sometime between 1978 and 1979. In the early 1960s, the southern end of SR 777 was truncated by a quarter of a mile when SR 775 (now SR 776) was realigned along Indiana Avenue.

=== Major intersections ===
Location	mi	km	Destinations	Notes
Englewood	0.0	0.0	SR 776 (Indiana Avenue)	
	1.0	1.6	Pine Street	southern terminus
North Port	7.7	12.4	US 41 (Tamiami Trail) – CoolToday Park	CR 777 continues as SR 777
North Port	1.000 mi = 1.609 km; 1.000 km = 0.621 mi			

== County Road 778 ==
County Road 778
- Location: Sarasota
- Length: 7.7 mi (12.4 km)

County Road 778 (CR 778) is Desoto Road in Sarasota.

=== Route description ===
CR 778 begins at University Parkway on the east edge of Sarasota city limits. From here, it proceeds east along Desoto Road. It crosses the Seminole Gulf Railway and continues a short distance to US 301. CR 778 officially terminates at US 301, though Desoto Road continues east as an undesignated to Desoto Lakes.

=== History ===
Desoto Road was originally designated SR 778 and ran between US 41 and US 301. It later became CR 778 after it was relinquished to county control. In the early 1990s, University Parkway (CR 610) was extended west to Desoto Road near Sarasota–Bradenton International Airport. Desoto Road west of University Parkway then became part of University Parkway upon completion of the extension.

== County Road 779 ==
County Road 779
- Location: North Port
- Length: 5.6 mi (9.0 km)

County Road 779 (CR 779) is Toledo Blade Boulevard in North Port. Despite being signed as a county route at its interchange with Interstate 75, the entire route of Toledo Blade Boulevard from the Charlotte County Line at Hillsborough Boulevard to Tropicaire Boulevard is maintained by the city of North Port.

=== Major intersections ===
Location	mi	km	Destinations	Notes
North Port	0.0	0.0	Hillsborough Boulevard	continues into Charlotte County
North Port	2.6	4.2	Price Boulevard	
North Port	4.7	7.6	I-75 (SR 93) – Naples, Tampa	Exit 179 on I-75
North Port	5.7	9.2	Tropicaire Boulevard	
1.000 mi = 1.609 km; 1.000 km = 0.621 mi

== County Road 780 ==
County Road 780
- Location: Englewood–North Port
- Length: 14.1 mi (22.7 km)

County Road 780 (CR 780) is primarily Fruitville Road east of Interstate 75. It runs along Fruitville Road from Coburn Road (just east of I-75) east to Myakka Road. It then follows Myakka Road south to the Manatee County Line at Hancock Road. The route was previously part of SR 780.

== County Road 789 ==
County Road 789
- Location: Laurel–Osprey–Casey Key
- Length: 2.1 mi (3.4 km)

County Road 789 (CR 789) is the unsigned designation applied discontinuously to Blackburn Point Road and Albee Road. Both roads connect the mainland to Casey Key.

== County Road 789A ==
County Road 789A
- Location: Siesta Key
- Length: 2.6 mi (4.2 km)

County Road 789A (CR 789A) runs along Beach Road, Ocean Boulevard, and Higel Avenue on the western side of Siesta Key.
