= Florida State Road 758 =

Highway in Florida

State Road 758 and County Road 758
- SR 758 in red, CR 758 in blue

Route information
- Maintained by FDOT and Sarasota County Public Works
- Length: 11.2 mi (18.0 km)

Major junctions
- West end: CR 72 in Siesta Key
- US 41 in Sarasota; I-75 near Bee Ridge
- East end: Mauna Lua Road in Lake Sarasota

Location
- Country: United States
- State: Florida
- County: Sarasota

Highway system
- Florida State Highway System; Interstate; US; State; Former; Pre‑1945; Toll; Scenic
← SR 754	→ SR 762

State Road 758 (SR 758) and County Road 758 (CR 758) are together an 11.2-mile-long (18.0 km) state road in Sarasota, Florida, United States. It runs from Siesta Key north and east to Sarasota, where it continues east through Bee Ridge. Its eastern terminus is at Interstate 75 (SR 93) where it continues east as a county road with no designation. The full route was previously SR 758.

== Route description ==
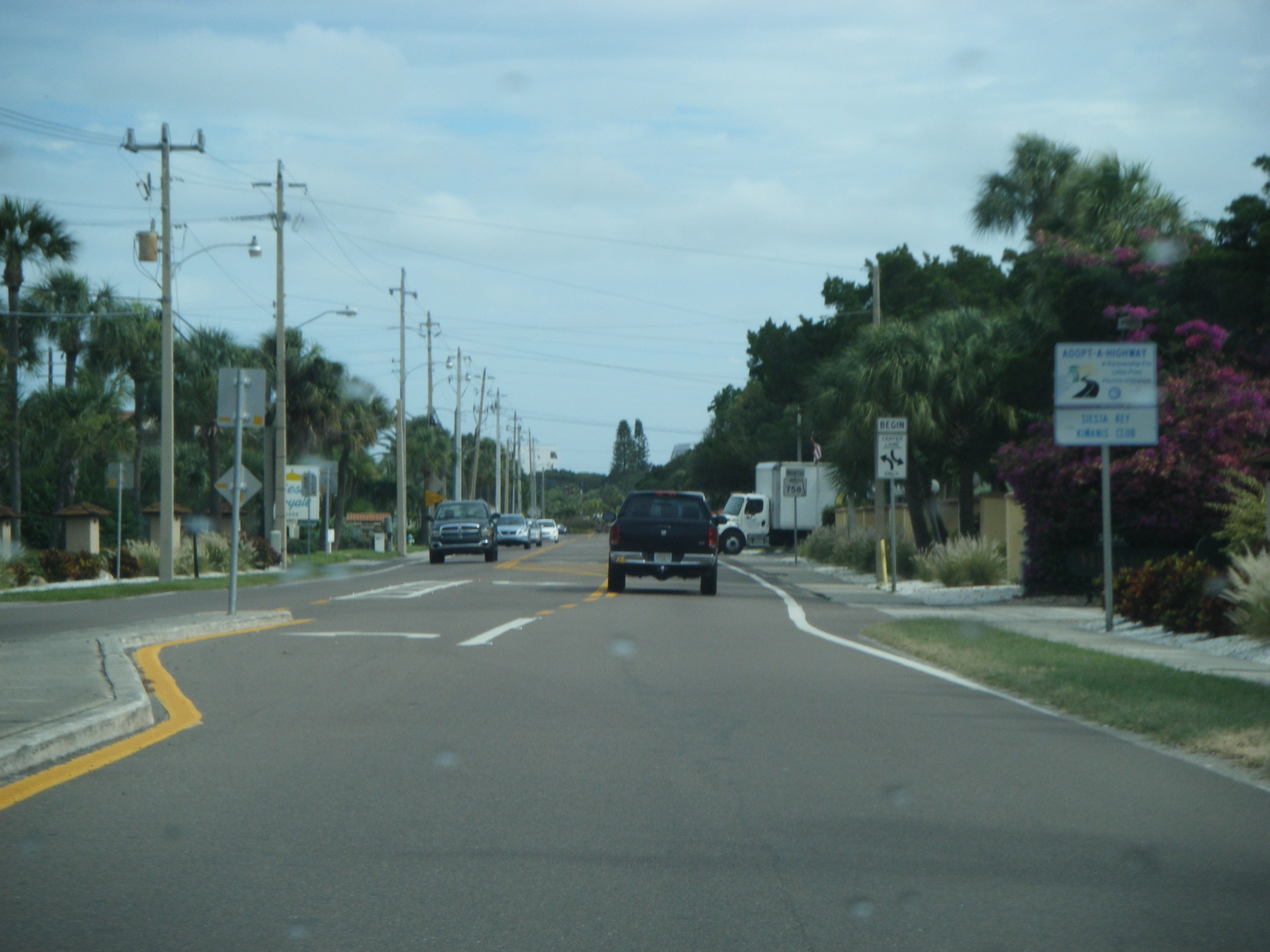
CR 758 northbound past southern terminus at CR 72 in Siesta Key

=== County Road 758 ===
CR 758 begins at an intersection with the western terminus of SR 72 in Siesta Key, heading northwest on Midnight Pass Road, a two-lane divided highway. The median becomes a center left-turn lane as the road heads through resort residential and commercial areas a short distance to the east of the Gulf of Mexico. SR 758 turns north to remain on Midnight Pass Road, with CR 789A (Beach Road) heading west to Siesta Beach. Midnight Pass Road continues as a two-lane undivided road passing through residential neighborhoods, curving to the northwest. SR 758 intersects CR 789A again and turns north onto Higel Avenue, passing more homes in the northern part of Siesta Key. The state road turns east onto Siesta Drive, running through more residential areas.

The road crosses Roberts Bay on a drawbridge and heads into Sarasota, lined with more residences. SR 758 turns south onto South Osprey Avenue, a three-lane road with a center left-turn lane that passes through residential and commercial areas. The state road curves east onto Bay Road and passes more businesses as it comes to an intersection with US 41/SR 45.

=== State Road 758 ===
SR 758 begins at an intersection with US 41/SR 45. From US 41, the road is Bee Ridge Road and it widens into a six-lane road with a two-way left-turn lane. The road passes through a mix of homes and businesses, intersecting South Shade Avenue before crossing Phillippi Creek. The state road heads east through more developed areas, crossing South Tuttle Avenue/Swift Road, South Lockwood Ridge Road, Beneva Road, and Sawyer Road. The road crosses the former Seminole Gulf Railway line (Legacy Trail) and intersects McIntosh Road, where just east of that at Bond Place, it becomes a four-lane divided highway. Then it crosses Honore Avenue, and just before it intersects with Cattlemen Road, it becomes a six-lane divided highway as it continues through areas of residential neighborhoods and businesses. SR 758 reaches its eastern terminus slightly east of an interchange with I-75/SR 93 in Bee Ridge, with the unnumbered Bee Ridge Road continuing to the east as a four-lane divided road until an intersection with Mauna Loa Boulevard.

== History ==
SR 758 was designated in the 1980s running from Siesta Key to Interstate 75. While Interstate 75 opened through Sarasota in 1981, the Bee Ridge Road interchange did not open until 1982.

The segment of SR 758 west of US 41 was previously a discontinuous segment of SR 789. From 1945 to 1957, present-day Bee Ridge Road was part of SR 72, which then ran down Sawyer Road and Proctor Road toward Arcadia (which was SR 220 prior to the 1945 Florida state road renumbering). SR 72 was rerouted along Clark Road and Stickney Point Road around 1957.

In 2018, Sarasota County accepted the state’s $40 million offer to swap responsibility for several roads (i.e. road swap) in exchange for the state to perform major improvements on River Road, one of the county’s main thoroughfares and vital evacuation routes. FDOT handed over the responsibility of a portion of State Road 758, known locally as Siesta Drive and Midnight Pass Road, west of US 41. The county will be responsible for ongoing maintenance of those roadways, although the state would still maintain the bridges to Siesta Key. The road transfer was completed in September 2020.

== Siesta Key Bridge ==
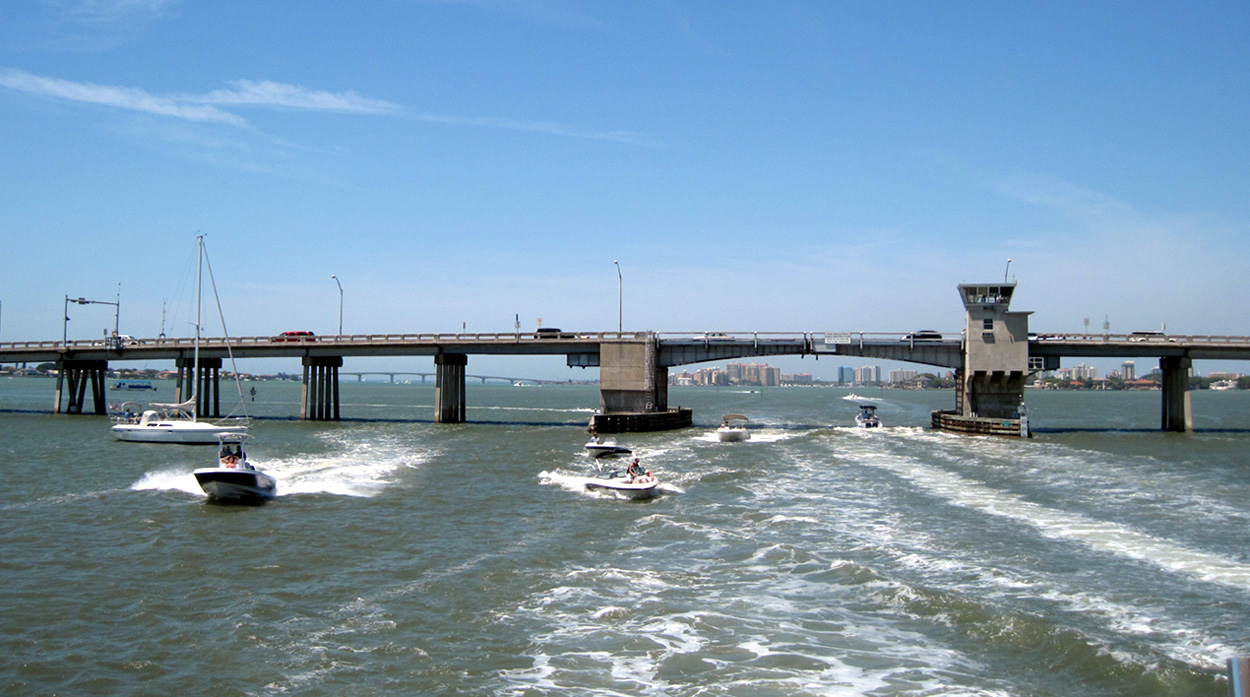
Siesta Key Bridge

The Siesta Key Bridge (also called the Sarasota Bay Bridge) is a double-leaf bascule bridge that crosses the Roberts Bay, connecting the barrier islands of Siesta Key and the mainland of Sarasota, Florida. The bridge is maintained by the Florida Department of Transportation. It was built in 1972, replacing the original swing bridge built in 1926.

== Major intersections ==
The entire route is in Sarasota County.

Location	mi	km	Destinations	Notes
Siesta Key	0.000	0.000	CR 72 east (Stickney Point Road) / Midnight Pass Road (CR 789 south)	
Siesta Key	1.238	1.992	Beach Road (CR 789A north) - Siesta Beach Business District	
Siesta Key	3.051	4.910	Higel Avenue (CR 789A south) to Ocean Boulevard - Siesta Beach, Siesta Village	no left turn northbound
Sarasota	4.513– 4.754	7.263– 7.651	Siesta Key Bridge over Roberts Bay (Gulf Intracoastal Waterway)	
Sarasota	5.771 0.0	9.288 0.0	US 41 (South Tamiami Trail / SR 45) – Marie Selby Botanical Gardens	west end of state maintenance
Southgate–South Gate Ridge line	2.026	3.261	Beneva Road (CR 773)	
	5.148	8.285	I-75 (SR 93) – Tampa, Naples	I-75 exit 207
Lake Sarasota	5.432	8.742	east end of state maintenance	
1.000 mi = 1.609 km; 1.000 km = 0.621 mi: Route transition
