= List of places in Florida: G =

This list of current cities, towns, unincorporated communities, counties, and other recognized places in the U.S. state of Florida also includes information on the number and names of counties in which the place lies, and its lower and upper zip code bounds, if applicable.

| Name of place | Number of counties | Counties | Lower zip code | Upper zip code |
|---|---|---|---|---|
| Gaberonne | 1 | Escambia | | |
| Gables Estates | 1 | Miami-Dade | 33143 | 33156 |
| Gabriella | 1 | Seminole | | |
| Gainesville | 1 | Alachua | 32601 | 14 |
| Gainesville East | 1 | Alachua | 32601 | |
| Gainesville North | 1 | Alachua | 32601 | |
| Gainesville West | 1 | Alachua | 32601 | |
| Gall | 1 | Polk | | |
| Galliver | 1 | Okaloosa | 32564 | |
| Galloway | 1 | Polk | 33805 | |
| Galt City | 1 | Santa Rosa | 32530 | |
| Gandy | 1 | Pinellas | | |
| Gandyville | 1 | Escambia | | |
| Garcon Point | 1 | Santa Rosa | | |
| Gardena | 1 | Seminole | 32765 | |
| Garden City | 1 | Duval | 32218 | |
| Garden City | 1 | Okaloosa | 32536 | |
| Garden Cove | 1 | Monroe | | |
| Garden Grove | 1 | Hernando | 34609 | |
| Garden Grove | 1 | Polk | | |
| Gardenia Gardens | 1 | Leon | | |
| Garden Isles | 1 | Broward | | |
| Gardens of Gulf Cove | 1 | Charlotte | | |
| Gardenville | 1 | Hillsborough | 33534 | |
| Gardner | 1 | Hardee | 33890 | |
| Gardner | 1 | Leon | | |
| Garnier | 1 | Okaloosa | 32548 | |
| Gary | 1 | Hillsborough | | |
| Gaskin | 1 | Walton | 32433 | |
| Gaskins | 1 | Calhoun | | |
| Gaskins Still | 1 | Gulf | | |
| Gasparilla | 1 | Lee | | |
| Gateway | 1 | Lee | | |
| Gateway Mall | 1 | Pinellas | 33702 | |
| Gay | 1 | Hernando | | |
| Geiger Key | 1 | Monroe | | |
| Geigers Landing | 1 | Seminole | | |
| General Mail Center | 1 | Duval | 32203 | |
| Geneva | 1 | Seminole | 32732 | |
| Genoa | 1 | Hamilton | | |
| Gentiles | 1 | Polk | | |
| Georgetown | 1 | Putnam | 32139 | |
| Georgiana | 1 | Brevard | 32952 | |
| Gibson | 1 | Gadsden | 32333 | |
| Gibsonia | 1 | Polk | 33805 | |
| Gibsonton | 1 | Hillsborough | 33534 | |
| Gifford | 1 | Indian River | 32960 | |
| Gilberts Mill | 1 | Washington | | |
| Gilchrist | 1 | Charlotte | | |
| Gillette | 1 | Manatee | 33561 | |
| Gilmore | 1 | Duval | 32211 | |
| Ginnie Springs | 1 | Gilchrist | | |
| Glades Area | 1 | Palm Beach | | |
| Gladeview | 1 | Miami-Dade | | |
| Glass | 1 | Jackson | | |
| Glencoe | 1 | Volusia | 32069 | |
| Glendale | 1 | Walton | 32433 | |
| Glennell | 1 | Hillsborough | | |
| Glen Ridge | 1 | Palm Beach | 33406 | |
| Glen St. Mary | 1 | Baker | 32040 | |
| Glenvar Heights | 1 | Miami-Dade | 33143 | |
| Glenwood | 1 | Bay | 32401 | |
| Glenwood | 1 | Nassau | | |
| Glenwood | 1 | Volusia | 32722 | |
| Glenwood Heights | 1 | Miami-DadeGlennell, Florida | | |
| Glidden Park | 1 | St. Lucie | | |
| Globe | 1 | Citrus | | |
| Glory | 1 | Gadsden | 32351 | |
| Glynlea | 1 | Duval | 32216 | |
| Godfrey Road | 1 | Broward | | |
| Golden Beach | 1 | Miami-Dade | 33160 | |
| Golden Beach | 1 | Sarasota | 33595 | |
| Golden Gate | 1 | Collier | 33999 | |
| Golden Gate | 1 | Martin | 33494 | |
| Golden Gate Estates | 1 | Collier | | |
| Golden Glades | 1 | Miami-Dade | | |
| Golden Heights | 1 | Broward | | |
| Golden Isles | 1 | Broward | 33009 | |
| Golden Lakes | 1 | Palm Beach | | |
| Goldenrod | 2 | Orange, Seminole | 32733 | |
| Golden Shores | 1 | Miami-Dade | 33160 | |
| Goldsboro | 1 | Seminole | | |
| Gold Tree | 1 | Sarasota | 33577 | |
| Golf | 1 | Palm Beach | 33444 | |
| Golfair Manor | 1 | Duval | 32218 | |
| Golf Estates | 1 | Broward | | |
| Golf Lake Estates | 1 | Manatee | 33505 | |
| Golfview | 1 | Palm Beach | 33406 | |
| Golfview Heights | 1 | Palm Beach | 33406 | |
| Gomez | 1 | Martin | 33455 | |
| Gonzalez | 1 | Escambia | 32560 | |
| Goodbys | 1 | Duval | | |
| Goodbys Lake | 1 | Duval | 32217 | |
| Good Hope | 1 | Okaloosa | 32531 | |
| Goodland | 1 | Collier | 33933 | |
| Goodno | 1 | Glades | 33471 | |
| Gopher Ridge | 1 | St. Johns | | |
| Gordon | 1 | Alachua | | |
| Gordon | 1 | Walton | 32433 | |
| Gordon Chapel | 1 | Putnam | 32640 | |
| Gordonville | 1 | Polk | 33830 | |
| Gotha | 1 | Orange | 34734 | |
| Goulding | 1 | Escambia | 32503 | |
| Goulds | 1 | Miami-Dade | 33170 | |
| Gowers Corner | 1 | Pasco | | |
| G. Pierce Wood Memorial Hospital | 1 | DeSoto | | |
| Graceville | 1 | Jackson | 32440 | |
| Grady | 1 | Lafayette | | |
| Graham | 1 | Bradford | 32042 | |
| Grahamsville | 1 | Marion | | |
| Gramlin | 1 | Glades | | |
| Grand Crossing | 1 | Duval | | |
| Grandin | 1 | Putnam | 32138 | |
| Grand Island | 1 | Lake | 32735 | |
| Grand Park | 1 | Duval | 32219 | |
| Grand Ridge | 1 | Jackson | 32442 | |
| Grandview | 1 | Putnam | | |
| Granger | 1 | Columbia | | |
| Grangers Mill | 1 | Columbia | 32055 | |
| Grant | 1 | Brevard | 32949 | |
| Grantham | 1 | Washington | | |
| Grant-Valkaria | 1 | Brevard | | |
| Grassy Key | 1 | Monroe | 33050 | |
| Gratigny | 1 | Miami-Dade | 33168 | |
| Grayton Beach | 1 | Walton | 32454 | |
| Grayvik | 1 | Monroe | | |
| Greater Carrollwood | 1 | Hillsborough | | |
| Greater Northdale | 1 | Hillsborough | | |
| Greater Sun Center | 1 | Hillsborough | | |
| Greenacres | 1 | Palm Beach | 33463 | |
| Greenacres City | 1 | Palm Beach | 33463 | |
| Green Bay | 1 | Polk | | |
| Greenbriar | 1 | Pinellas | | |
| Greenbriar | 1 | Seminole | 32771 | |
| Green Cove Springs | 1 | Clay | 32043 | |
| Greenfield | 1 | Columbia | | |
| Greenfield | 1 | Duval | | |
| Greenfield | 1 | Pasco | | |
| Greenfield Manor | 1 | Duval | 32216 | |
| Greenhead | 1 | Washington | | |
| Green Hills | 1 | Bay | 32438 | |
| Green Hills | 1 | Miami-Dade | 33157 | |
| Greenland | 1 | Duval | 32224 | |
| Green-Mar Acres | 1 | Miami-Dade | | |
| Green Meadow | 1 | Broward | | |
| Green Point | 1 | Franklin | | |
| Green Pond | 1 | Polk | | |
| Greensboro | 1 | Gadsden | 32330 | |
| Greenville | 1 | Madison | 32331 | |
| Greenwood | 1 | Jackson | 32443 | |
| Greenwood | 1 | Santa Rosa | 32565 | |
| Grenelefe | 1 | Polk | 33844 | |
| Gretna | 1 | Gadsden | 32332 | |
| Griffin | 1 | Polk | 33805 | |
| Griffins Corner | 1 | Hardee | 33873 | |
| Gritney | 1 | Holmes | | |
| Gross | 1 | Nassau | 32097 | |
| Grove City | 1 | Charlotte | 34224 | |
| Groveland | 1 | Lake | 34736 | |
| Grove Park | 1 | Alachua | 32640 | |
| Grove Park | 1 | Duval | 32216 | |
| Grove Park | 1 | Hillsborough | 33614 | |
| Grove Park | 1 | Polk | 33801 | |
| Grove Park Estates | 1 | Hillsborough | 33614 | |
| Grove Park Vista | 1 | Pinellas | | |
| Guilford | 1 | Union | | |
| Gulf Beach | 1 | Escambia | 32507 | |
| Gulf Beach Heights | 1 | Escambia | | |
| Gulf Breeze | 1 | Santa Rosa | 32561 | |
| Gulf City | 1 | Hillsborough | 33570 | |
| Gulf Cove | 1 | Charlotte | 33953 | |
| Gulf Gate | 1 | Sarasota | | |
| Gulf Gate East | 1 | Sarasota | 33583 | |
| Gulf Gate Estates | 1 | Sarasota | 33581 | |
| Gulf Hammock | 1 | Levy | 32639 | |
| Gulf Harbors | 1 | Pasco | 34652 | |
| Gulf Islands National Seashore | 3 | Escambia, Okaloosa, Santa Rosa | 32561 | |
| Gulf Lagoon Beach | 1 | Bay | 32401 | |
| Gulf Pine | 1 | Pasco | | |
| Gulf Pines | 1 | Walton | | |
| Gulfport | 1 | Pinellas | 33737 | |
| Gulf Port | 1 | Pinellas | | |
| Gulf Resort Beach | 1 | Bay | 32401 | |
| Gulf Shores | 1 | Sarasota | 33595 | |
| Gulf Stream | 1 | Palm Beach | 33444 | |
| Gull Point | 1 | Escambia | | |
| Gun Club Estates | 1 | Palm Beach | | |

== See also ==
- Florida
- List of municipalities in Florida
- List of former municipalities in Florida
- List of counties in Florida
- List of census-designated places in Florida
