= Garcon Point =

Garcon Point may refer to:

- Garcon Point (Florida), a peninsula in the U.S. state of Florida
- Garcon Point, Florida, a community on the peninsula
- Garcon Point Bridge, a bridge in Florida
