= Longleaf pine ecosystem =

Temperate plant ecosystem typical of region of north America

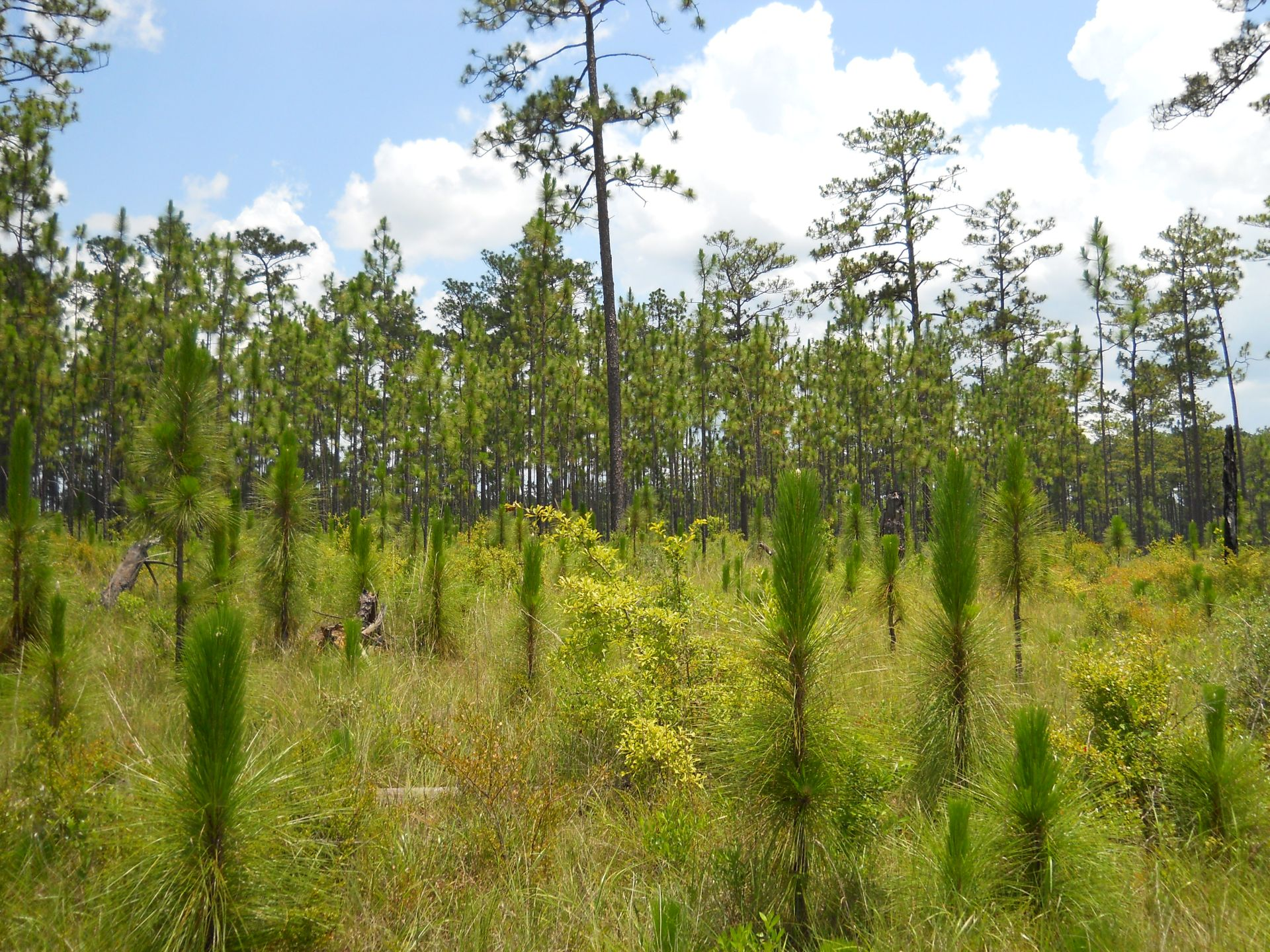
Naturally regenerated longleaf pines in DeSoto National Forest, Mississippi

The longleaf pine ecosystem is a temperate coniferous forest ecosystem dominated by longleaf pine (Pinus palustris) and native to the Southern United States. It is one of the most biodiverse ecosystems in North America, and serves as habitat for many rare plant and animal species.

Once one of the largest ecosystems in North America— ranging from Florida in the south to Virginia in the north, and extending as far west as Texas— it now occupies less than a quarter of its original range. The ecosystem has become fragmented and degraded due to logging, urbanization, and fire suppression. Techniques used to preserve and restore degraded longleaf pine ecosystem includes planting longleaf pine seedlings, introducing prescribed fire regimens, managing native ground cover, and controlling invasive species.

== Ecology ==
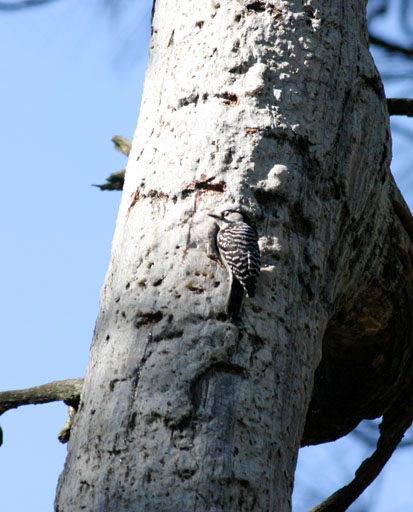
Red cockaded woodpecker at nest cavity in longleaf pine

The longleaf pine ecosystem is one of the richest habitats in North America, and its forest floor is one of the most diverse of its kind in the world. As of 2001, there are an estimated 27 federal endangered species and 100 species of concern that reside in the ecosystem. Some of the species in this ecosystem have limited range due to topography and climate of some regions of the system. The most notable species of the ecosystem are the longleaf pine, wiregrass, and red-cockaded woodpecker, all of which were found throughout the historic range. The longleaf pine (Pinus palustris) is characterized as having bushy clusters of 10 inches (25 cm) long needles and large 6 to 12 inches (15 to 30 cm) long pine cones. These pines are capable of growing 80 to 100 feet (24 to 30 m) tall with a diameter of 2.5 feet (80 cm) across, only in well suited soil. The longleaf pine is notable for its thick bark, which aids in the species' resistance to fire and to southern pine beetle outbreaks.

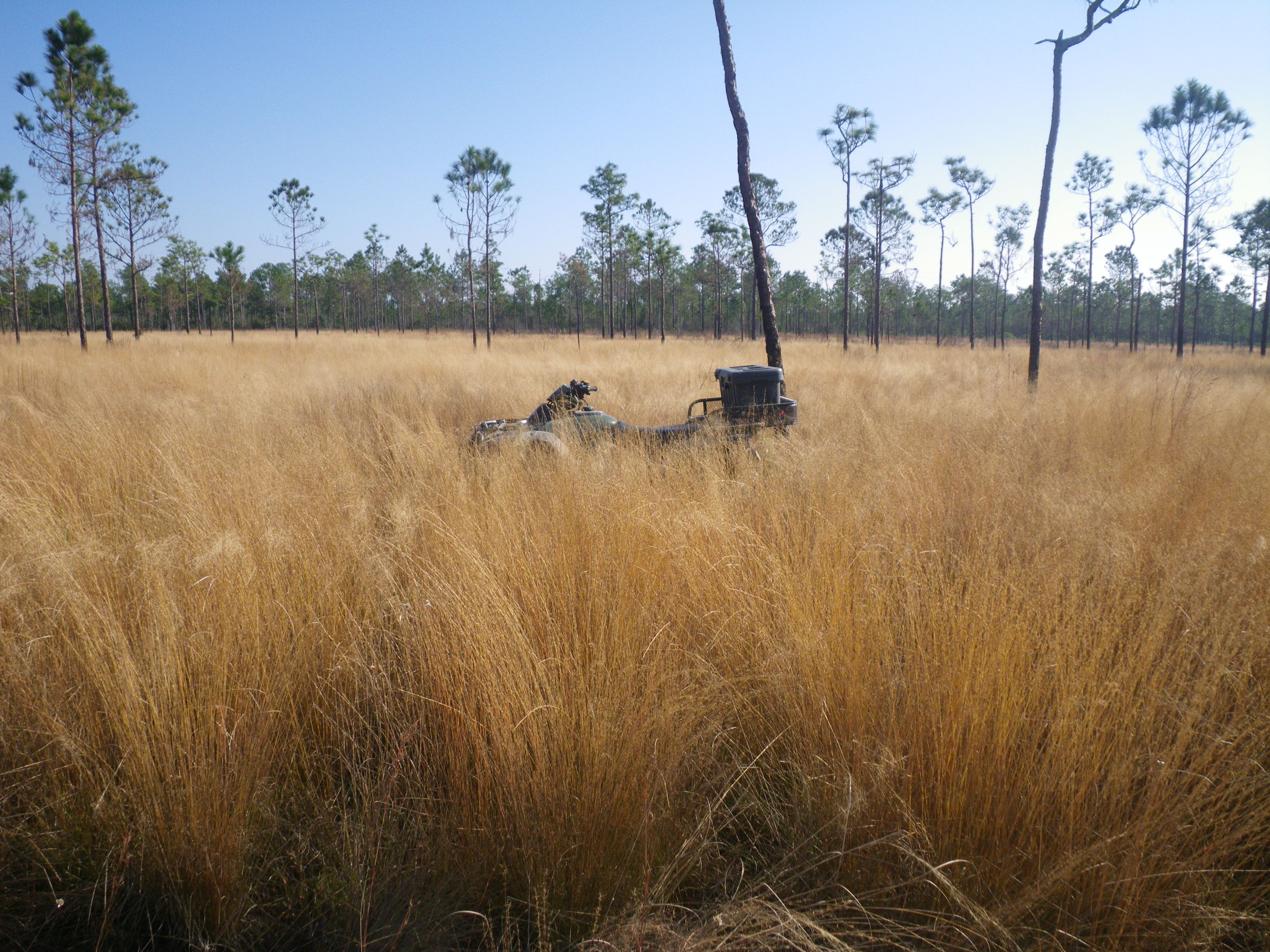
Wiregrass ecosystem on the Gulf Coast

The grass species Carolina wiregrass (Aristida stricta), which is found in the northern portion, and southern wiregrass (Aristida beyrichiana), which is found in the southern portion, are the dominant grass species of the habitat. These grass species occur in clumps which measure 6 inches (15 cm) across and have flat leaves that reach 20 inches (51 cm) long. These wiregrass species play a key role in the reproduction and spread of the longleaf pine, as they help to carry fire across the land.

The red-cockaded woodpecker (Picoides borealis) was once a common inhabitant of this habitat, but since the decline of the ecosystem it has been placed on the federal endangered species list. The woodpecker adults are characterized by being 7 inches (18 cm) long, with a black head, white cheek patch, and barred back with black and white stripes that give the appearance of a latter. In males, a red strip atop the head is only visible when young or up close. This woodpecker carefully selects longleaf pine, or associated pine species of the area, for heart rot disease. Once a tree is selected, excavation of a cavity is achieved usually taking 2 years to complete.

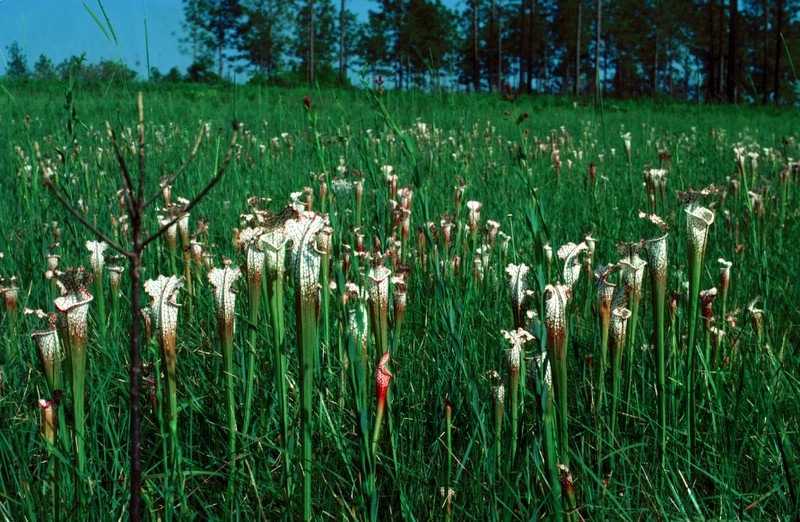
A field with Sarracenia leucophylla (white-topped pitcher plant). Scenes such as this used to be common in the coastal plains of the southeast US.

Embedded within the longleaf pine ecosystem are countless varieties of microhabitats. Among the more unique of these habitats are pitcher plant bogs. Pitcher plant communities are specialized for sites with abundant moisture but little nutrients. Many bog ecosystems exist on a porous sand surmounting impervious clay, which traps rainwater. On a hill, escape of water from saturated areas can result in the formation of a seep and a type of bog called a seepage slope. In flatwood ecosystems, bogs on flat terrain may be called wet prairies. Forests typically grade into a wetland bog habitat, forming an ecotone that harbors diverse species.

Pitcher plants have modified leaves shaped into hollow tubes (that look like a water pitcher), which attract insects. Downward pointing hairs and slippery walls make escape difficult and the insects are dissolved and digested by enzymes in the bottom of the pitcher. Other plants trap small insects on flat sticky leaves before slowly digesting them. Several types of pitcher plants as well as other carnivorous plants grow in the longleaf pine ecosystem. Species include the hooded pitcher plant, trumpet pitcher plant, white-topped pitcher plant, and parrot pitcher plant. Other bog plants include colic-root; goldcrest; meadow-beauty (also called deerflower); white-topped sedge; orange milkwort (also called "bog Cheetos" because of their resemblance to the snack brand); bog-buttons (also called "hatpins"); several species of orchids; and many other wildflowers. Both soil moisture conditions and full sun are critical to these plants. Most of these bog plants have little shade tolerance. Pitcher plant bogs are fire dependent habitats. The frequent fires common to the longleaf ecosystem keep woody shrubs from encroaching on bogs. Without fire, moisture-loving shrubs invade drying up bogs and shading out the herbaceous plants.

Despite the longleaf pine ecosystem's heavy endangerment and degradation, new species are still being described from it due to its heavy biodiversity. In 2018, one of the world's largest salamanders, the reticulated siren, was described from wetlands in the longleaf pine ecosystem along the Gulf Coastal Plain.

The longleaf pine ecosystem is a fire climax community, that is "a plant and animal community that is limited by and adapted to an early successional stage by frequent fire disturbances". Fire destroys other pine species and hardwoods which would outcompete the longleaf pines.

== History ==
=== Original range ===
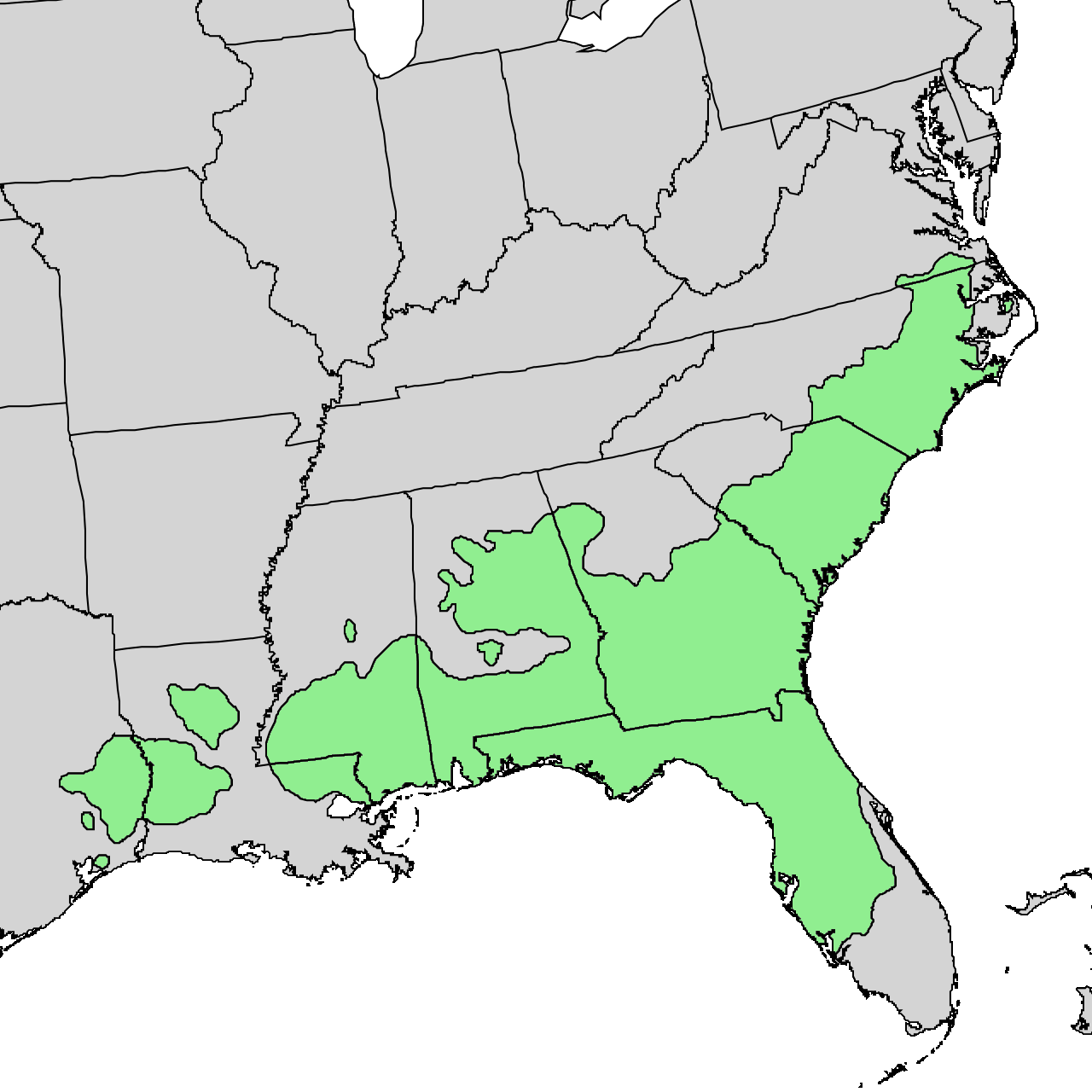
Natural distribution map for the longleaf pine (Pinus palustris)

During the last Ice Age, the Laurentide ice sheet covered a large portion of North America. During this period, longleaf pine grew in southern, coastal areas free from ice, ranging from Florida to Mexico. During the Holocene, the ice retreated, the climate became warm and dry, and the longleaf pine ecosystem established itself in its historical range.

The longleaf pine ecosystem was first described in the early 1500s by the Spaniard Hernando de Soto, and subsequent Native American accounts of the ecosystem were recorded in journals written by European explorers. As North America was colonized, various explorers who traveled through the southeast recorded accounts of the ecosystem. In 1609, Captain John Smith discussed the ecosystem and the first exports of lumber products from pines growing close to the settlement of Jamestown, Virginia.

Prior to extensive settlement, the longleaf pine ecosystem consisted of 70 million acres (280,000 km^{2}) of pure longleaf pine stands and 20 million acres (81,000 km^{2}) of mixed stands, totaling 90 million acres (360,000 km^{2}). The ecosystem extended from southeastern Virginia down to northern Florida over to eastern Texas, forming the dominant land cover in the coastal plain of these states. There is some doubt about the original extent due to lack of systematic data from the coastal regions of Florida to Mexico.

=== Role of fire ===
Before Europeans settled the region, Native Americans regularly set fires in order to encourage the growth of plants eaten by game animals— and therefore improve hunting prospects— and to clear undergrowth for ease of occupation and movement. Wildfire, ignited by lightning from summer thunderstorms, also played a role in the ecosystem. Once started, fires burned across the landscape for days, weeks, and even months due to the lack of habitat fragmentation nowadays caused by roads and cities.

== Decline ==
The decline of the ecosystem proceeded slowly at first, as the Native American population declined (largely due to spread of Old World epidemic diseases) and with it deliberately set fires. European settlers in turn gradually began using fire as a management tool, similar to existing traditions in England, Scotland, and Ireland. Introduction of the razorback hog (Sus scrofa scrofa) caused considerable damage to plants, including longleaf pine seedlings.

Over the 17th and 18th centuries exploitation and clearing of the forest increased. Small living quarters such as log cabins were built using longleaf pine logs. As the tree made good lumber it was soon being exported. Longleaf pine resin was extracted for production of naval stores. To obtain the resin from the live longleaf pine, pioneers first cut and removed wood exposing a deep cavity, called a box at the base of the tree. Next a medium-sized, V-shaped cut was performed, above the box to start the resin flow into the box. As resin flowed into the box, it was collected and placed in barrels for shipment. Years afterward the tree itself would become weak and sensitive to wind storms.

Roads and railroads were constructed in various locations throughout the southeast beginning in the 1800s for transportation and forest harvesting, which together with settlement building caused habitat fragmentation in the ecosystem.

After the Civil War in 1865, the agriculture boom started. Many pioneers had received word about the cash crop cotton, soon land purchase and the clearing of land increased significantly. With this sudden shift in land use, the additions of large plantations were established in the ecosystem, as well. In result of this boom plus the addition of forest harvesting and transportation right of ways, further habitat loss was increasing at an alarming rate.

During the early 1900s, more habitat lost was due to World War I. Vast acres of the longleaf pine in the southeast were cleared to aid in ship building for the war effort. With this push in demand, 1909 marked the peak of longleaf pine lumber production. At this period, it was realized that decline in the ecosystem was eminent through the bare landscape with little regeneration of longleaf pine. So to compensate for loss, replanting of some clear-cut areas in the ecosystem was planted by land owners and Civilian Conservation Corps enrollees during the Great Depression era of the mid-1900s. Although in some sectors of landowners in the southeast learned over the years that the longleaf pine was a slow growing tree, and thus began replanting the ecosystem with faster growing trees species like slash and loblolly pines. With this replanting, faster tree growth and greater lumber production was achieved.

As of 2011, only 3 million acres (12,000 km^{2}) or so of the longleaf pine ecosystem are left in North America. This significant drop in the ecosystem acreage marks a 97 percent decrease. In overlook of the ecosystem, today, it is described as being patchy and uneven in the distribution across the landscape. Of the now 3 percent ecosystem acreage, there are a documented 8,856 acres (3,584 ha) of old growth longleaf pine stands left.

== Contemporary issues ==
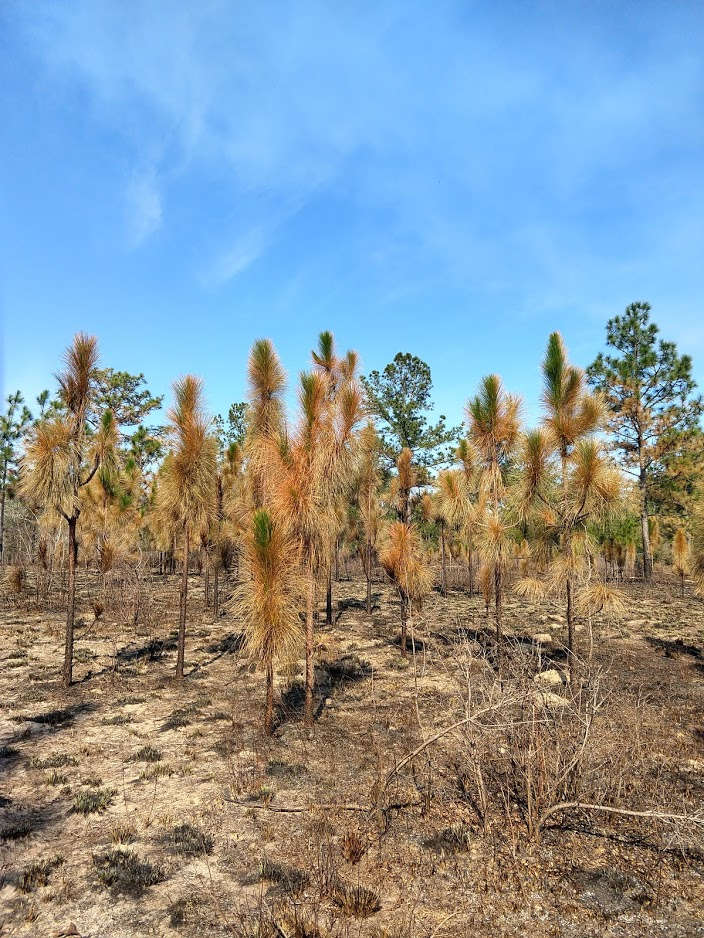
Longleaf pine saplings with burnt foliage after a prescribed fire

Concerns for the longleaf pine ecosystem were raised in the early 1900s. These concerns were focused on regeneration of harvested longleaf pine stands and remaining pine stands in the ecosystem. Men like Henry E. Hardtner and Herman H. Chapman were among the first to collaborate ways to implement longleaf regeneration in the ecosystem. Later the United States Forest Service recognized and had studied the need of fire in the ecosystem burning (man-lit fire) was implemented on national forest.

The major concerns for the longleaf pine ecosystem in the 21st century are urbanization and fire suppression. With the North American population increasing by roughly 2.5 million people a year, the competition for space is increasing. Threat to the longleaf pine ecosystem is emanate through land clearing for commercial businesses and housing developments. Fire suppression is also ultimately caused by development, because the increase in the wildland–urban interface results in increased human endangerment from wildfires and an increased incentive to suppress them. The habitat fragmentation resulting from development has also precluded the large-scale wildfires which historically maintained the ecosystem. The lack of fire in the remaining ecosystem has resulted in its further deterioration. In result, the federal government and state government agencies in Alabama, Florida, Georgia, Louisiana, Mississippi, North Carolina, South Carolina, Texas, and Virginia have teamed up to provide aid to this critical ecosystem. This aid comes in the form of cost share programs, set up by states to assist private land owners in education, financial aid, and guidance on the longleaf pine ecosystem restoration.

== See also ==
- Sandhill
