= Garden Cove =

There are at least two places Garden Cove may refer to:

- Garden Cove, Newfoundland and Labrador
- Garden Cove, Florida, an unincorporated community on the island of Key largo, Monroe County, Florida, United States.
