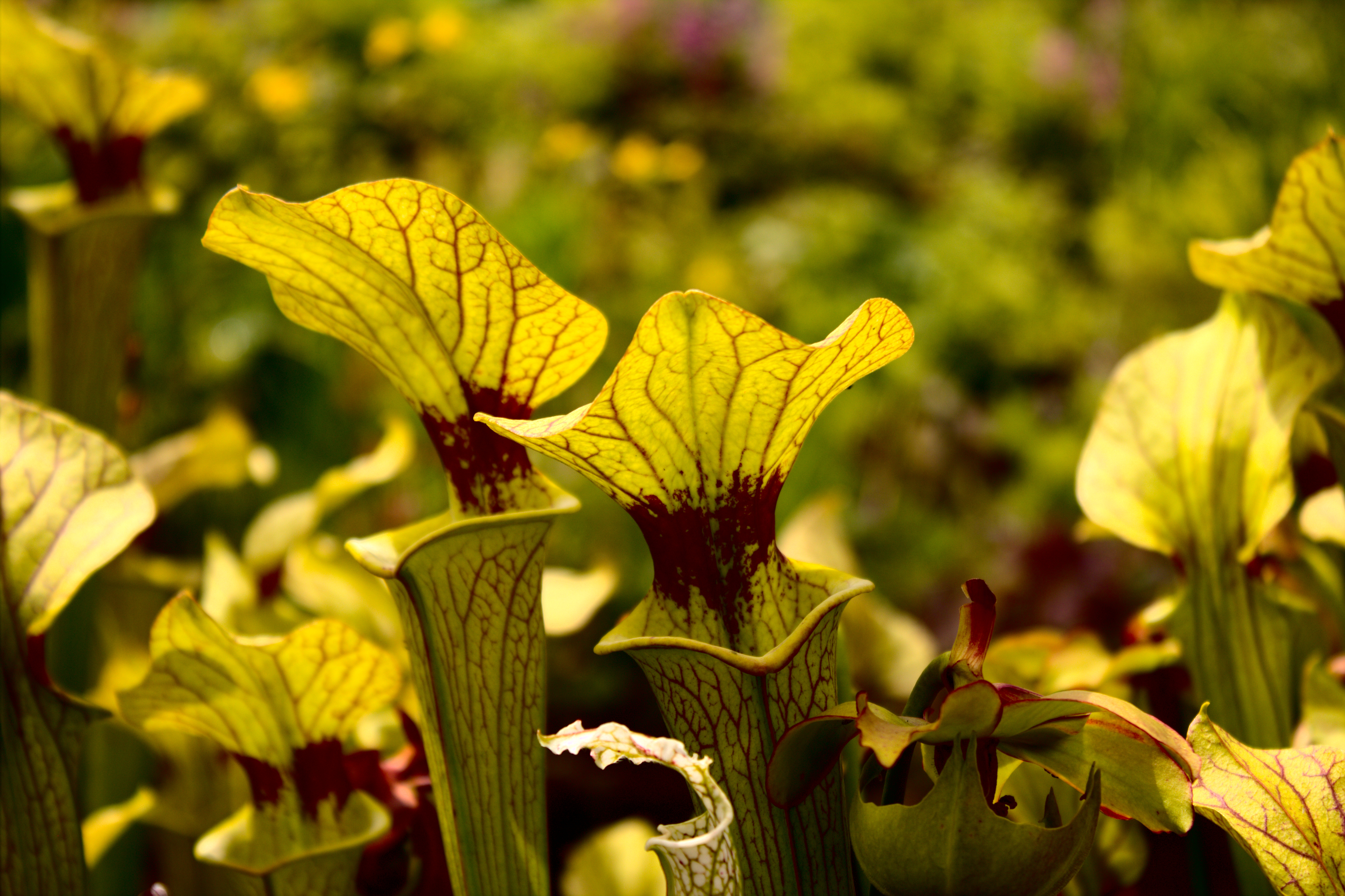

Scientific classification
- Kingdom: Plantae
- Clade: Tracheophytes
- Clade: Angiosperms
- Clade: Eudicots
- Clade: Asterids
- Order: Ericales
- Family: Sarraceniaceae
- Genus: Sarracenia
- Species: S. × moorei

Binomial name
- Sarracenia × moorei T.Moore & Mast.

= Sarracenia × moorei =

Sarracenia × moorei is a natural hybrid between Sarracenia flava and Sarracenia leucophylla. This hybrid is found in regions where the two parent species coexist, primarily in the southeastern United States, particularly in Florida and Alabama.
