= Dickerson City, Florida =

- Unincorporated community
- Location within Florida Location within the United States
- Coordinates: 30°28′59″N 87°03′34″W
- Country: United States
- State: Florida
- County: Santa Rosa

Area
  - Total: 1.333 sq mi (3.45 km^{2})
  - Land: 1.320 sq mi (3.42 km^{2})
  - Water: 0.011 sq mi (0.028 km^{2})
- Elevation: 7 ft (2.1 m)

Population (2020)
  - Total: 160
  - Density: 120/sq mi (47/km^{2})
- Time zone: UTC-6 (Central (CST))
  - Summer (DST): UTC-5 (CDT)
- ZIP code: 32583
- Area code: 850
- GNIS feature ID: 2652393

Dickerson City is an unincorporated community and census-designated place in Santa Rosa County, Florida, United States. Its population was 160 at the 2020 census, up from 146 as of the 2010 census. It is part of the Pensacola—Ferry Pass—Brent, Florida Metropolitan Statistical Area. The community is located on the eastern side of Garcon Point.

== Geography ==
According to the U.S. Census Bureau, the community has an area of 1.333 square miles (3.45 km^{2}); 1.320 square miles (3.42 km^{2}) of its area is land, and 0.011 square miles (0.028 km^{2}) is water.

== Demographics ==
Dickerson City first appeared as a census designated place in the 2010 U.S. census.
