= Garcon Point, Florida =

- Unincorporated community and Census-designated place
- Location within Florida Location within the United States
- Coordinates: 30°28′33″N 87°05′24″W
- Country: United States
- State: Florida
- County: Santa Rosa

Area
  - Total: 1.94 sq mi (5.03 km^{2})
  - Land: 1.90 sq mi (4.91 km^{2})
  - Water: 0.046 sq mi (0.12 km^{2})
- Elevation: 7 ft (2.1 m)

Population (2020)
  - Total: 457
  - Density: 240.9/sq mi (93.02/km^{2})
- Time zone: UTC-6 (Central (CST))
  - Summer (DST): UTC-5 (CDT)
- ZIP code: 32583
- Area code: 850
- GNIS feature ID: 2629556

Garcon Point is an unincorporated community and Census-designated place in Santa Rosa County, Florida, United States. Its population was 457 as of the 2020 census, up from 347 at the 2010 census. It is part of the Pensacola—Ferry Pass—Brent, Florida Metropolitan Statistical Area. The community is located on the peninsula of the same name.

== Geography ==
According to the U.S. Census Bureau, the community has an area of 1.937 square miles (5.02 km^{2}); 1.889 square miles (4.89 km^{2}) of its area is land, and 0.048 square miles (0.12 km^{2}) is water.

== Demographics ==
Garcon Point, Florida has a population of 457 as of the 2020 US Census.

Historical population
Census	Pop.	Note	%±
1990	43		—
2000	280		551.2%
2010	347		23.9%
2020	457		31.7%
U.S. Decennial Census

Garcon Point first appeared as a census designated place in the 2010 U.S. census.

== See also ==
- Garcon Point Bridge
