= Lake Sarasota, Florida =

- Census-designated place
- Location in Sarasota County and the state of Florida
- Coordinates: 27°17′41″N 82°25′56″W
- Country: United States
- State: Florida
- County: Sarasota

Area
  - Total: 0.68 sq mi (1.76 km^{2})
  - Land: 0.67 sq mi (1.73 km^{2})
  - Water: 0.0077 sq mi (0.02 km^{2})
- Elevation: 33 ft (10 m)

Population (2020)
  - Total: 3,979
  - Density: 5,944.9/sq mi (2,295.35/km^{2})
- Time zone: UTC−05 (Eastern Time Zone)
  - Summer (DST): UTC−04 (EDT)
- ZIP code: 34241
- Area code: 941
- FIPS code: 12-38690
- GNIS feature ID: 2403204

Lake Sarasota is a census-designated place (CDP) in Sarasota County, Florida, United States. The population was 3,979 at the 2020 census, down from 4,679 at the 2010 census. It is part of the North Port–Bradenton–Sarasota, Florida Metropolitan Statistical Area.

== Geography ==
According to the United States Census Bureau, the CDP has a total area of 1.4 square miles (3.6 km^{2}), of which 1.4 square miles (3.5 km^{2}) is land and 0.04 square miles (0.1 km^{2}), or 2.63%, is water.

== Demographics ==
Historical population
Census	Pop.	Note	%±
1990	4,117		—
2000	4,458		8.3%
2010	4,679		5.0%
2020	3,979		−15.0%

=== 2020 census ===
As of the 2020 census, Lake Sarasota had a population of 3,979. The median age was 39.8 years. 21.3% of residents were under the age of 18 and 14.6% were 65 years of age or older. For every 100 females there were 102.0 males, and for every 100 females age 18 and over there were 98.9 males age 18 and over.

100.0% of residents lived in urban areas, while 0.0% lived in rural areas.

There were 1,467 households, of which 31.0% had children under the age of 18 living in them. Of all households, 52.6% were married-couple households, 15.3% were households with a male householder and no spouse or partner present, and 21.3% were households with a female householder and no spouse or partner present. About 18.0% of all households were made up of individuals, 7.9% had someone living alone who was 65 years of age or older, and 33.1% had individuals over the age of 65.

There were 1,519 housing units, of which 3.4% were vacant. The homeowner vacancy rate was 1.2% and the rental vacancy rate was 3.1%. The population density was 2,842.1 inhabitants per square mile (1,097.3/km^{2}), and housing units were at an average density of 1,085 units per square mile (419 units/km^{2}).

Racial composition as of the 2020 census
Race	Number	Percent
White	3,229	81.2%
Black or African American	117	2.9%
American Indian and Alaska Native	17	0.4%
Asian	48	1.2%
Native Hawaiian and Other Pacific Islander	0	0.0%
Some other race	164	4.1%
Two or more races	404	10.2%
Hispanic or Latino (of any race)	546	13.7%

=== Income and poverty ===
The 2010 Decennial Census did not report income data. The 2020 American Community Survey: 5-Yr Estimates Tables show the median income for a household in the CDP was $84,112, and the median income for a family was $89,276. Males had a median income of $47,122 versus $26,233 for females. About 4.90% of families and 5.67% of the population were below the poverty line, including 2.77% of those under age 18 and 6.77% of those age 65 or over. 85.1% of individuals below the poverty line were female.
