= Sarasota Springs, Florida =

- Census-designated place
- Location in Sarasota County and the state of Florida
- Coordinates: 27°18′31″N 82°28′29″W
- Country: United States
- State: Florida
- County: Sarasota

Area
  - Total: 2.77 sq mi (7.18 km^{2})
  - Land: 2.68 sq mi (6.93 km^{2})
  - Water: 0.097 sq mi (0.25 km^{2})
- Elevation: 23 ft (7.0 m)

Population (2020)
  - Total: 12,521
  - Density: 4,679.5/sq mi (1,806.78/km^{2})
- Time zone: UTC-5 (Eastern (EST))
  - Summer (DST): UTC-4 (EDT)
- ZIP code: 34232
- Area code: 941
- FIPS code: 12-64325
- GNIS feature ID: 2402824

Sarasota Springs is a census-designated place (CDP) in Sarasota County, Florida, United States. The population was 12,521 at the 2020 census, down from 14,395 at the 2010 census. It is part of the North Port–Bradenton–Sarasota, Florida Metropolitan Statistical Area.

== Geography ==
According to the United States Census Bureau, the CDP has a total area of 3.6 square miles (9.4 km^{2}), of which 3.5 square miles (9.1 km^{2}) is land and 0.12 square miles (0.3 km^{2}), or 3.33%, is water.

== Demographics ==
Historical population
Census	Pop.	Note	%±
1970	4,405		—
1980	13,860		214.6%
1990	16,088		16.1%
2000	15,875		−1.3%
2010	14,395		−9.3%
2020	12,521		−13.0%

=== 2020 census ===
As of the 2020 census, Sarasota Springs had a population of 12,521. The median age was 43.1 years. 19.9% of residents were under the age of 18 and 19.0% of residents were 65 years of age or older. For every 100 females there were 95.7 males, and for every 100 females age 18 and over there were 94.1 males age 18 and over.

100.0% of residents lived in urban areas, while 0.0% lived in rural areas.

There were 4,894 households in Sarasota Springs, of which 27.8% had children under the age of 18 living in them. Of all households, 47.3% were married-couple households, 17.2% were households with a male householder and no spouse or partner present, and 26.7% were households with a female householder and no spouse or partner present. About 23.6% of all households were made up of individuals and 11.4% had someone living alone who was 65 years of age or older.

There were 5,164 housing units, of which 5.2% were vacant. The homeowner vacancy rate was 0.8% and the rental vacancy rate was 5.0%.

Racial composition as of the 2020 census
Race	Number	Percent
White	9,672	77.2%
Black or African American	195	1.6%
American Indian and Alaska Native	68	0.5%
Asian	182	1.5%
Native Hawaiian and Other Pacific Islander	7	0.1%
Some other race	687	5.5%
Two or more races	1,710	13.7%
Hispanic or Latino (of any race)	2,358	18.8%

=== 2000 census ===
As of the 2000 census, there were 15,875 people, 6,611 households, and 4,469 families residing in the CDP. The population density was 4,389.6 inhabitants per square mile (1,694.8/km^{2}). There were 7,101 housing units at an average density of 1,963.5 units per square mile (758.1 units/km^{2}). The racial makeup of the CDP was 95.65% White, 0.73% African American, 0.23% Native American, 0.74% Asian, 0.03% Pacific Islander, 1.28% from other races, and 1.34% from two or more races. Hispanic or Latino of any race were 4.78% of the population.

There were 6,611 households, out of which 28.4% had children under the age of 18 living with them, 53.2% were married couples living together, 11.1% had a female householder with no husband present, and 32.4% were non-families. 25.5% of all households were made up of individuals, and 12.7% had someone living alone who was 65 years of age or older. The average household size was 2.40 and the average family size was 2.87.

In the CDP, the population was spread out, with 22.5% under the age of 18, 5.7% from 18 to 24, 28.5% from 25 to 44, 24.9% from 45 to 64, and 18.4% who were 65 years of age or older. The median age was 41 years. For every 100 females, there were 92.3 males. For every 100 females age 18 and over, there were 87.2 males.

The median income for a household in the CDP was $41,981, and the median income for a family was $50,131. Males had a median income of $31,418 versus $25,227 for females. The per capita income for the CDP was $22,427. About 5.2% of families and 6.9% of the population were below the poverty line, including 10.9% of those under age 18 and 1.8% of those age 65 or over.
