= Woodmere, Florida =

- Unincorporated community
- Location within the state of Florida
- Coordinates: 27°01′14″N 82°23′26″W
- Country: United States
- State: Florida
- County: Sarasota
- Elevation: 13 ft (4.0 m)
- Time zone: UTC-5 (EST)
  - Summer (DST): UTC-4 (EDT)
- Area code: 941
- FIPS code: 12-78535
- GNIS feature ID: 294979

Woodmere is an unincorporated community 5 miles (8.0 km) north of Englewood in Sarasota County, Florida.

== History ==
Woodmere was settled in 1918 as a headquarters for the newly established Manasota Lumber Company. The town had a four-story sawmill, three drying sheds, a commissary, a movie house, 1,500 homes, and two churches. The Gulf Coast Rail Road connected Woodmere to Venice, where lumber could be moved to the Seaboard Rail Road that ran to Tampa.

Between 1921 and 1922, the lumber operation was sold but continued operation on a smaller scale, thanks to a decrease in demand for lumber and reduced timber to harvest. The 1923-1924 Sarasota County Directory lists 145 residents in Woodmere but by 1926 there were only 26 listed.
