= South Sarasota, Florida =

- Census-designated place
- Location in Sarasota County and the state of Florida
- Coordinates: 27°17′08″N 82°32′00″W
- Country: United States
- State: Florida
- County: Sarasota

Area
  - Total: 2.33 sq mi (6.03 km^{2})
  - Land: 1.92 sq mi (4.98 km^{2})
  - Water: 0.41 sq mi (1.05 km^{2})
- Elevation: 16 ft (4.9 m)

Population (2020)
  - Total: 5,133
  - Density: 2,668.4/sq mi (1,030.27/km^{2})
- Time zone: UTC-5 (Eastern (EST))
  - Summer (DST): UTC-4 (EDT)
- FIPS code: 12-67887
- GNIS feature ID: 2402877

South Sarasota is a census-designated place (CDP) in Sarasota County, Florida, United States. The population was 5,133 at the 2020 census, up from 4,950 at the 2010 census. It is part of the North Port–Bradenton–Sarasota, Florida Metropolitan Statistical Area.

== Geography ==
According to the United States Census Bureau, the CDP has a total area of 2.3 square miles (6.0 km^{2}), of which 1.9 square miles (5.0 km^{2}) is land and 0.42 square miles (1.1 km^{2}), or 17.41%, is water.

== Demographics ==
Historical population
Census	Pop.	Note	%±
1970	3,730		—
1980	4,297		15.2%
1990	5,298		23.3%
2000	5,314		0.3%
2010	4,950		−6.8%
2020	5,133		3.7%

=== 2020 census ===
As of the 2020 census, South Sarasota had a population of 5,133. The median age was 55.2 years. 16.0% of residents were under the age of 18 and 34.9% of residents were 65 years of age or older. For every 100 females there were 97.1 males, and for every 100 females age 18 and over there were 95.2 males age 18 and over.

100.0% of residents lived in urban areas, while 0.0% lived in rural areas.

There were 2,365 households in South Sarasota, of which 19.9% had children under the age of 18 living in them. Of all households, 47.2% were married-couple households, 18.6% were households with a male householder and no spouse or partner present, and 27.1% were households with a female householder and no spouse or partner present. About 31.1% of all households were made up of individuals and 18.3% had someone living alone who was 65 years of age or older.

There were 2,749 housing units, of which 14.0% were vacant. The homeowner vacancy rate was 3.0% and the rental vacancy rate was 13.2%.

Racial composition as of the 2020 census
Race	Number	Percent
White	4,460	86.9%
Black or African American	60	1.2%
American Indian and Alaska Native	21	0.4%
Asian	91	1.8%
Native Hawaiian and Other Pacific Islander	0	0.0%
Some other race	162	3.2%
Two or more races	339	6.6%
Hispanic or Latino (of any race)	457	8.9%

=== 2000 census ===
As of the census of 2000, there were 5,314 people, 2,509 households, and 1,487 families residing in the CDP. The population density was 2,724.2 inhabitants per square mile (1,051.8/km^{2}). There were 2,719 housing units at an average density of 1,393.9 per square mile (538.2/km^{2}). The racial makeup of the CDP was 95.97% White, 0.40% African American, 0.21% Native American, 1.17% Asian, 1.34% from other races, and 0.92% from two or more races. Hispanic or Latino of any race were 4.03% of the population.

There were 2,509 households, out of which 20.6% had children under the age of 18 living with them, 49.3% were married couples living together, 7.3% had a female householder with no husband present, and 40.7% were non-families. 32.8% of all households were made up of individuals, and 14.1% had someone living alone who was 65 years of age or older. The average household size was 2.12 and the average family size was 2.68.

In the CDP, the population was spread out, with 18.1% under the age of 18, 4.6% from 18 to 24, 22.2% from 25 to 44, 29.7% from 45 to 64, and 25.4% who were 65 years of age or older. The median age was 48 years. For every 100 females, there were 95.2 males. For every 100 females age 18 and over, there were 93.6 males.

The median income for a household in the CDP was $53,125, and the median income for a family was $74,907. Males had a median income of $48,409 versus $23,031 for females. The per capita income for the CDP was $45,217. About 3.9% of families and 6.6% of the population were below the poverty line, including 9.9% of those under age 18 and 0.6% of those age 65 or over.
