= Gulf Harbors, Florida =

Unincorporated community in Florida, U.S.

Coordinates: 28°14′06″N 82°45′29″W

Gulf Harbors is an unincorporated community in western Pasco County, Florida, United States. According to Rand McNally, the latest population estimates for the community is approximately 5,000.

Gulf Harbors and its sister communities, the Woodlands, Sea Forest, Sea Colony, Egrets Place and Harbor Colony are deed restricted, waterfront communities and cater to boating and fishing enthusiasts.
