= Siesta Beach =

Beach located on Siesta Key, Florida

Coordinates: 27.2647707°N 82.5506534°W

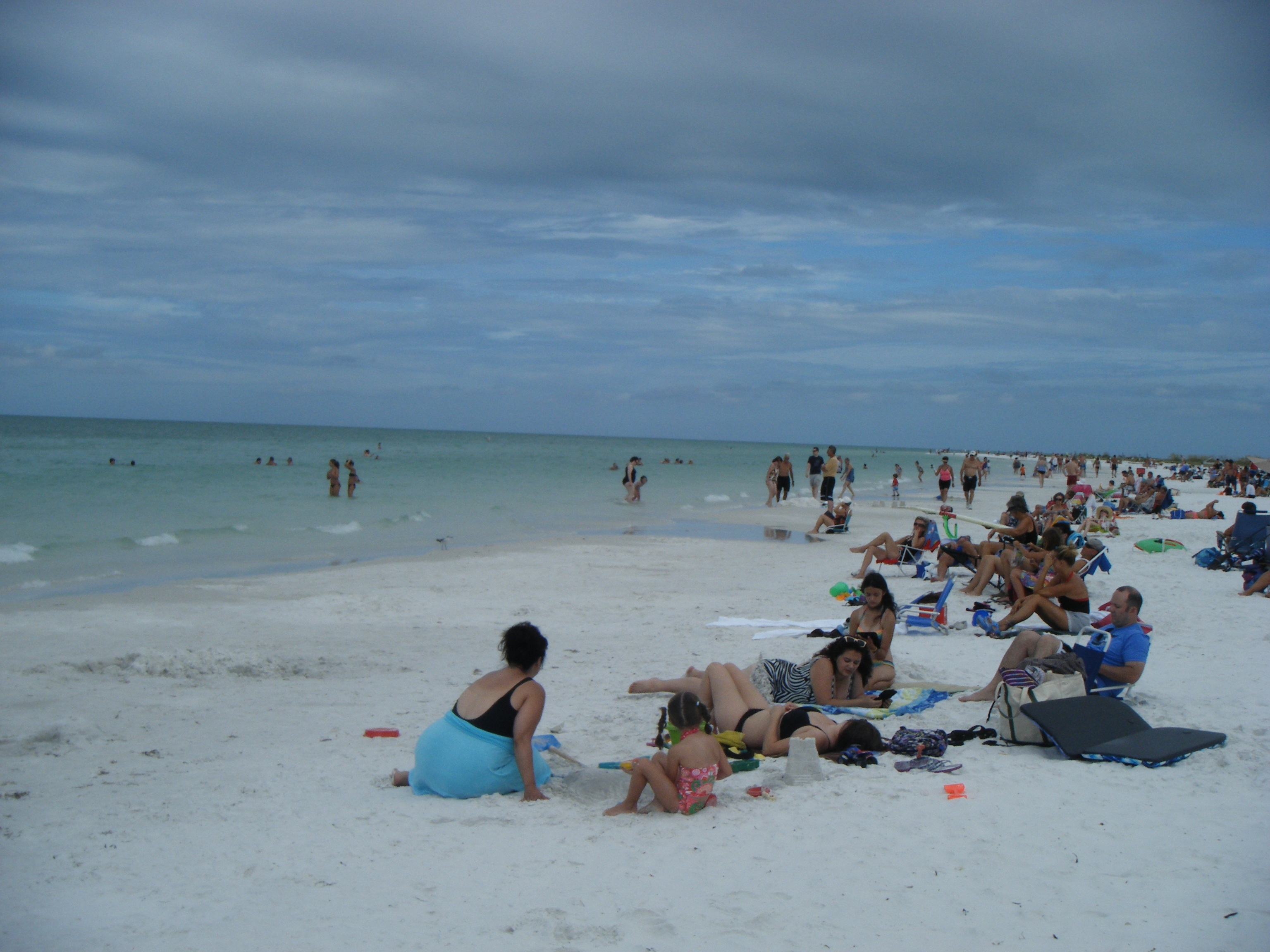
Siesta Beach

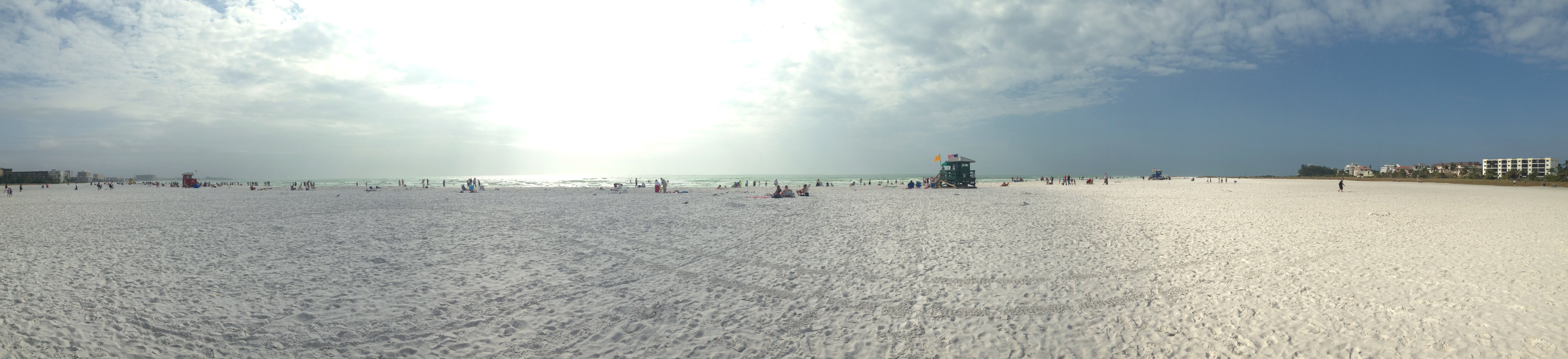
Panorama illustrating the expansive width

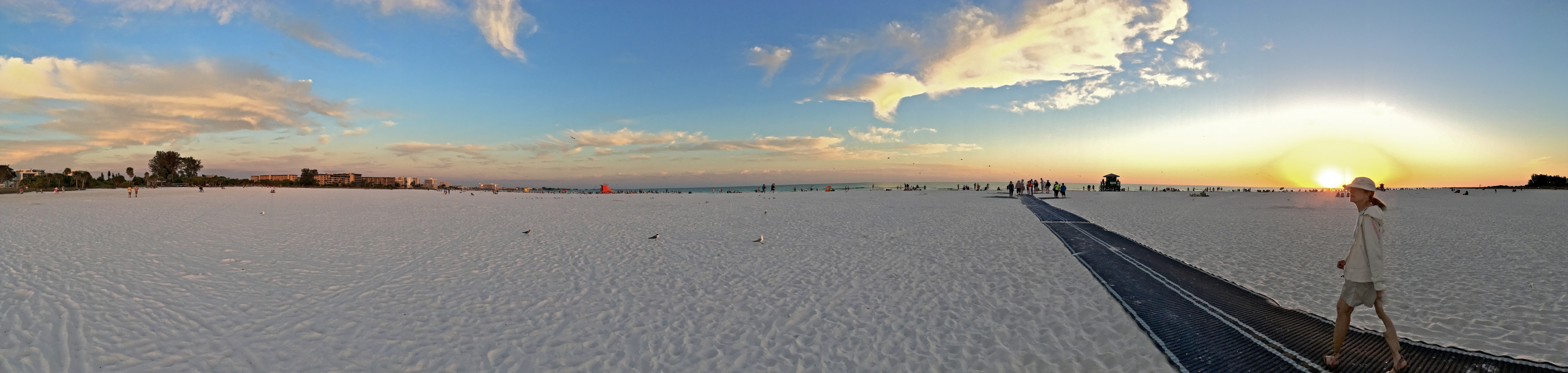
Roll-out mat aids walking

Siesta Beach (sometimes known as Siesta Key Beach) is a beach located on Siesta Key in the U.S. state of Florida.

Unlike beaches elsewhere that are made up mostly of pulverized coral, Siesta Beach's sand is 99% quartz, most of which comes from the Appalachian Mountains. Over time the feldspar and mica have been removed from the rock, leaving almost pure quartz. Even on the hottest days, the sand is so reflective that it feels cool underfoot. According to Harvard University geologists, it's estimated that the sand on Siesta Beach and Crescent Beach on Siesta Key is millions of years old, having its origin in the Appalachians and flowing down the rivers from the mountains until it eventually was deposited on the shores of Siesta Key.

The southern portion of Siesta Beach is alternatively called Crescent Beach, which extends to the seawall and Point of Rocks, an area with coral and active marine life.

Siesta Beach is not only long, but also expansively wide, especially around the Siesta Key Beach Pavilion section. The beach is so wide the city installed walking mats to help beachgoers get to the shore, where they can then walk on firmer wet sand.

== History ==
Up until the 20th century, Siesta Key was virtually vacant and was referred to as Clam Island, Little Sarasota Island, or Sarasota Key. The Island was not connected to the city of Sarasota in any way, so the only way to get to and from the island was by boat. It had deep vegetation, snakes of all varieties (including all of the venomous ones found in the United States - rattlesnakes, copperheads, water moccasins and coral snakes), sand fleas, wildcats and wild boars.

It remained that way until 1906 when Mr. and Mrs. Roberts opened the Roberts’ (or Siesta) Inn. This hotel became very popular for people who wanted a place to escape the cold winters of the north. The Roberts’ Inn also attracted many people because of Mrs. Roberts’ cooking (specifically her seafood dishes). Mr. Roberts teamed up with Mayor Harry Higel to create the Siesta Land Company, which formed Siesta Village and renamed the island Siesta Key around a year after he opened his hotel. In 1914, Higel opened his own hotel called Higelhurst and used his boat to transfer guests to and from the city. Higel also worked to get the Army Corps of Engineers to build a bridge that would connect the key with the city of Sarasota. He was finally able to, and that bridge opened in 1917, which connected the northern part of the key with the city. In 1927, a second bridge opened at the southern end of the key on Stickney Point.

In 1954, Sarasota County first purchased property on the key for a public beach. Slowly, Siesta Key began to grow in population, and now around 350,000 tourists visit it every year. Siesta Beach was named #1 in the contiguous U.S. (Kaanapali Beach on Maui was named #1 in the entire U.S.) and #11 in the world in the 2020 TripAdvisor Travelers' Choice™ awards. This island oasis has grabbed the top spot three times since 2015.

In 2018 the beaches were impacted by Karenia brevis, an algae drift known as red tide. Several tons of dead fish washed ashore on the beach at various times, most of which were removed in the early morning hours by the truckload. The toxins from red tide cause respiratory discomfort to humans, in addition to killing fish, turtles, and manatees. In the past, the cycle of red tide has lasted up to eighteen months.
