= Garcon Point Bridge =

Toll bridge in Santa Rosa County, Florida, US

- Coordinates: 30°25′17″N 87°5′27″W
- Carries: 2 lanes of SR 281
- Crosses: East Bay
- Locale: Santa Rosa County, Florida
- Maintained by: Florida's Turnpike Enterprise
- ID number: 580174

Characteristics
- Design: Segmental box girder
- Material: Prestressed concrete
- Total length: 18,425 feet (5,616 meters)
- Width: 40 feet (12 meters)
- No. of spans: 127
- Clearance below: 65.6 feet (20.0 meters)

History
- Designer: Figg Bridge Engineers
- Opened: May 14, 1999; 27 years ago

Statistics
- Daily traffic: over 6,000 (2022)
- Toll: $2.30 (base)

Location
- Interactive map of Garcon Point Bridge

The Garcon Point Bridge is a two-lane toll bridge in Santa Rosa County, Florida. The bridge runs north-south across East Bay between Garcon Point and the Fairpoint Peninsula. The bridge carries Avalon Boulevard (SR 281), which connects Gulf Breeze Parkway (US 98) on the peninsula to I-10 and US 90 on the mainland near Milton.

The bridge was originally constructed by the Santa Rosa Bay Bridge Authority, a state-level special-purpose district. Due to traffic on the bridge never meeting initial projections, the authority was disbanded and the bridge was taken over by bondholders. In 2022, the bridge was acquired by the state government; it is currently managed as part of Florida's Turnpike System.

Tolls are collected via electronic toll collection at the north end of the bridge. As of September 2025, base tolls on the bridge are $2.30 for payments made by a SunPass-compatible transponder and $2.75 for toll-by-plate.

== History ==
=== Planning and construction ===
Plans for a bridge across East Bay, which would connect US 98 and I-10 and potentially spur development along the bridge's route, were first proposed in the late 1980s. The project was nicknamed "Bo's Bridge" due to the advocacy of then-Speaker of the Florida House Bolley "Bo" Johnson, who owned land in the area.

A 1996 study by consulting firm URS Greiner Woodward Clyde projected that the bridge would serve 7,500 vehicles per day. This number was based on the traffic volume of the nearby Mid-Bay Bridge, which connects the mainland to the resort town of Destin. On the basis of this study, the bridge authority raised $95 million in bonds, as well as an $8.5 million loan from the state government.

The bridge was designed by Figg Bridge Engineers, which had previously designed the Sunshine Skyway Bridge and the Seven Mile Bridge. During construction, builder Odebrecht-Metric dumped construction waste into Pensacola Bay in violation of the Clean Water Act; the company pled guilty and was fined $4 million.

The bridge was completed and opened on May 14, 1999 with a toll of $2.00.

=== Early financial issues ===
In 2000, average daily traffic was reported to only be 3,500 vehicles per day, around half of the original estimate. Unlike the Mid-Bay Bridge used to calculate the estimates, the Garcon Point Bridge saw little tourist traffic; in addition, the housing developments it connected to saw limited growth due to a moratorium on septic tanks.

Due to limited funds, the Santa Rosa Bay Bridge Authority raised the toll to $2.50 and requested an additional $500,000 from the state, which was vetoed by then-governor Jeb Bush in 2001. Over the next ten years, the bridge authority continued to raise toll rates, reaching $3.75 on January 5, 2011. Toll money collected on the bridge was only used to pay bondholders; maintenance and operation costs were paid by the Florida Department of Transportation (FDOT) using state revenue.

=== Default and bondholder ownership ===
In 2011, the bridge authority defaulted on a $2.2 million debt repayment. All but one of the authority's directors resigned, and control of the bridge's revenue reverted to bondholder representative BNY Mellon.

In November 2014, bondholders recommended that tolls be raised to $4 for SunPass users and $5 for cash users, as well as reducing a discount offered to frequent SunPass users from 50% to 25%, pending a bond-mandated traffic study. However, since the bridge authority's board of directors had effectively disbanded, the toll increase could not be formally submitted to FDOT. In 2018, bondholder representative UMB Bank sued FDOT in state court. The court ruled in UMB's favor, and the toll increase was implemented on March 1, 2020.

In September 2020, Hurricane Sally damaged the Pensacola Bay Bridge connecting Pensacola to the Fairpoint Peninsula, closing it to all traffic. Since Garcon Point Bridge was the primary alternate route to the peninsula, Governor Ron DeSantis ordered the suspension of all tolls on the Garcon Point Bridge. While the Pensacola Bay Bridge partially reopened on May 28, 2021, tolls on the Garcon Point Bridge remained suspended until its full reopening on July 6. Bondholders sued the state for $75 million in lost revenue due to the toll suspension, but this was rejected.

=== State ownership ===
In mid-2021, Governor DeSantis directed FDOT to reach a settlement with bondholders and acquire the bridge. The following June, the state reached an agreement with UMB to pay $134 million. Tolls were lowered to $2.30 for SunPass users and $2.75 for cash users, keeping the rates in-line with other state-owned toll bridges, and were redirected towards operation and maintenance costs. In May 2023, DeSantis signed HB 1305, which formally dissolved the Santa Rosa Bay Bridge Authority and allowed FDOT to transfer control of the bridge to Florida's Turnpike Enterprise (FTE).

In 2025, FTE announced that cash payments at the bridge would be discontinued, starting September 28 at 11 PM. The bridge was the last toll facility in the panhandle to accept cash payments.
