= Garden Cove, Florida =

- Unincorporated community
- Location within Florida Location within the United States
- Coordinates: 25.173°N 80.368°W
- Country: United States
- State: Florida
- County: Monroe
- Elevation: 3.3 ft (1 m)
- Time zone: UTC-5 (Eastern (EST))
  - Summer (DST): UTC-4 (EDT)

Garden Cove is an unincorporated community in Monroe County, Florida, United States, located in the upper Florida Keys on Key Largo immediately southwest and bordering the Census-designated place (CDP) of North Key Largo.

== Geography ==
Garden Cove is located at 25.173°N 80.368°W at an elevation of 3 feet (1 m).
