= Southgate, Florida =

- Census-designated place
- Location in Sarasota County and the state of Florida
- Coordinates: 27°18′21″N 82°30′18″W
- Country: United States
- State: Florida
- County: Sarasota

Area
  - Total: 1.74 sq mi (4.50 km^{2})
  - Land: 1.68 sq mi (4.34 km^{2})
  - Water: 0.062 sq mi (0.16 km^{2})
- Elevation: 7 ft (2.1 m)

Population (2020)
  - Total: 6,287
  - Density: 3,749.9/sq mi (1,447.83/km^{2})
- Time zone: UTC-5 (Eastern (EST))
  - Summer (DST): UTC-4 (EDT)
- ZIP code: 34239
- Area code: 941
- FIPS code: 12-67425
- GNIS feature ID: 2402886

Southgate is a census-designated place (CDP) in Sarasota County, Florida, United States. The population was 6,287 at the 2020 census, down from 7,173 at the 2010 census. It is part of the North Port–Bradenton–Sarasota, Florida Metropolitan Statistical Area.

== Geography ==
According to the United States Census Bureau, the CDP has a total area of 2.1 square miles (5.4 km^{2}), of which 2.0 square miles (5.2 km^{2}) is land and 0.077 square miles (0.2 km^{2}), or 3.58%, is water.

Southgate is an older suburb of Sarasota, built in the early 1960s. Many homes in Southgate feature more "retro" styling, and almost all are one story. The neighborhood is well kept-up, however, and is quickly becoming a place where more wealthy families reside. Property values in Southgate have skyrocketed in the last few years, and its close proximity to downtown Sarasota, beaches, and shopping makes it a very desirable place to live.

== Demographics ==
Historical population
Census	Pop.	Note	%±
1970	6,885		—
1980	7,322		6.3%
1990	7,324		0.0%
2000	7,455		1.8%
2010	7,173		−3.8%
2020	6,287		−12.4%

=== 2020 census ===
As of the 2020 census, Southgate had a population of 6,287. The median age was 49.9 years. 15.7% of residents were under the age of 18 and 26.0% of residents were 65 years of age or older. For every 100 females there were 94.4 males, and for every 100 females age 18 and over there were 91.3 males age 18 and over.

100.0% of residents lived in urban areas, while 0.0% lived in rural areas.

There were 2,920 households in Southgate, of which 21.0% had children under the age of 18 living in them. Of all households, 41.1% were married-couple households, 20.0% were households with a male householder and no spouse or partner present, and 30.4% were households with a female householder and no spouse or partner present. About 33.3% of all households were made up of individuals and 17.2% had someone living alone who was 65 years of age or older.

There were 3,198 housing units, of which 8.7% were vacant. The homeowner vacancy rate was 1.1% and the rental vacancy rate was 7.0%.

Racial composition as of the 2020 census
Race	Number	Percent
White	4,998	79.5%
Black or African American	104	1.7%
American Indian and Alaska Native	16	0.3%
Asian	132	2.1%
Native Hawaiian and Other Pacific Islander	1	0.0%
Some other race	300	4.8%
Two or more races	736	11.7%
Hispanic or Latino (of any race)	981	15.6%

=== 2000 census ===
As of the census of 2000, there were 7,455 people, 3,629 households, and 2,072 families residing in the CDP. The population density was 3,647.9 inhabitants per square mile (1,408.5/km^{2}). There were 4,013 housing units at an average density of 1,963.6 per square mile (758.2/km^{2}). The racial makeup of the CDP was 96.16% White, 0.80% African American, 0.21% Native American, 0.97% Asian, 0.09% Pacific Islander, 0.74% from other races, and 1.02% from two or more races. Hispanic or Latino of any race were 5.71% of the population.

There were 3,629 households, out of which 18.4% had children under the age of 18 living with them, 44.8% were married couples living together, 9.3% had a female householder with no husband present, and 42.9% were non-families. 34.9% of all households were made up of individuals, and 17.6% had someone living alone who was 65 years of age or older. The average household size was 2.05 and the average family size was 2.62.

In the CDP, the population was spread out, with 15.7% under the age of 18, 4.7% from 18 to 24, 25.0% from 25 to 44, 27.0% from 45 to 64, and 27.6% who were 65 years of age or older. The median age was 48 years. For every 100 females, there were 88.2 males. For every 100 females age 18 and over, there were 85.4 males.

The median income for a household in the CDP was $41,762, and the median income for a family was $50,335. Males had a median income of $33,109 versus $26,955 for females. The per capita income for the CDP was $24,148. About 5.1% of families and 6.8% of the population were below the poverty line, including 8.6% of those under age 18 and 4.6% of those age 65 or over.
