= Bee Ridge, Florida =

- Census-designated place
- Location in Sarasota County and the state of Florida
- Coordinates: 27°17′08″N 82°28′23″W
- Country: United States
- State: Florida
- County: Sarasota

Area
  - Total: 3.90 sq mi (10.11 km^{2})
  - Land: 3.75 sq mi (9.71 km^{2})
  - Water: 0.15 sq mi (0.40 km^{2})
- Elevation: 36 ft (11 m)

Population (2020)
  - Total: 9,955
  - Density: 2,654.4/sq mi (1,024.87/km^{2})
- Time zone: UTC−05:00 (Eastern (EST))
  - Summer (DST): UTC−04:00 (EDT)
- ZIP code: 34233
- Area codes: 941
- FIPS code: 12-04925
- GNIS feature ID: 2402675

Bee Ridge is a census-designated place (CDP) in Sarasota County, Florida, United States. The population was 9,955 at the 2020 census, up from 9,598 at the 2010 census. It is part of the North Port-Bradenton-Sarasota, Florida Metropolitan Statistical Area.

== Geography ==
According to the United States Census Bureau, the CDP has a total area of 3.9 square miles (10.1 km^{2}), of which 3.7 square miles (9.7 km^{2}) is land and 0.15 square miles (0.4 km^{2}), or 3.99%, is water.

== Demographics ==
Historical population
Census	Pop.	Note	%±
1980	3,313		—
1990	6,406		93.4%
2000	8,744		36.5%
2010	9,598		9.8%
2020	9,955		3.7%

=== Racial and ethnic composition ===
Bee Ridge CDP, Florida – Racial and ethnic composition Note: the US Census treats Hispanic/Latino as an ethnic category. This table excludes Latinos from the racial categories and assigns them to a separate category. Hispanics/Latinos may be of any race.
Race / Ethnicity (NH = Non-Hispanic)	Pop 2000	Pop 2010	Pop 2020	% 2000	% 2010	% 2020
White alone (NH)	8,296	8,673	8,379	94.88%	90.36%	84.17%
Black or African American alone (NH)	66	116	131	0.75%	1.21%	1.32%
Native American or Alaska Native alone (NH)	18	23	21	0.21%	0.24%	0.21%
Asian alone (NH)	59	173	266	0.67%	1.80%	2.67%
Native Hawaiian or Pacific Islander alone (NH)	0	0	2	0.00%	0.00%	0.02%
Other race alone (NH)	8	7	29	0.09%	0.07%	0.29%
Mixed race or Multiracial (NH)	42	84	308	0.48%	0.88%	3.09%
Hispanic or Latino (any race)	255	522	819	2.92%	5.44%	8.23%
Total	8,744	9,598	9,955	100.00%	100.00%	100.00%

=== 2020 census ===
As of the 2020 census, Bee Ridge had a population of 9,955. The median age was 58.0 years. 14.6% of residents were under the age of 18 and 38.6% of residents were 65 years of age or older. For every 100 females there were 84.2 males, and for every 100 females age 18 and over there were 81.7 males age 18 and over.

100.0% of residents lived in urban areas, while 0.0% lived in rural areas.

There were 4,552 households in Bee Ridge, of which 19.3% had children under the age of 18 living in them. Of all households, 44.8% were married-couple households, 14.6% were households with a male householder and no spouse or partner present, and 33.6% were households with a female householder and no spouse or partner present. About 33.6% of all households were made up of individuals and 23.0% had someone living alone who was 65 years of age or older.

There were 5,078 housing units, of which 10.4% were vacant. The homeowner vacancy rate was 1.7% and the rental vacancy rate was 13.0%.

Racial composition as of the 2020 census
Race	Number	Percent
White	8,565	86.0%
Black or African American	137	1.4%
American Indian and Alaska Native	24	0.2%
Asian	266	2.7%
Native Hawaiian and Other Pacific Islander	2	0.0%
Some other race	194	1.9%
Two or more races	767	7.7%

=== Demographic estimates ===
3.7% of the population was under 5 years old, and 54.1% were female persons.

=== Income and poverty ===
The median household income was $68,316 with an employment rate of 51.7%. 15.3% of the population were without health care coverage. 11.5% of the population lived below the poverty threshold.

14.8% of the population were foreign born persons. 9.6% of the population were veterans. 36.0% of the population aged 25 and over had a bachelor's degree or higher.

== Attractions ==
There are several parks in the Bee Ridge area including the Larry C. Manning Memorial Preserve and the Urfer Family Park, where the historic Dr. C. B. Wilson House is now located. There is also the Ashton Trailhead which is trailhead on the Legacy Trail (Florida).
