= South Gate Ridge, Florida =

- Census-designated place
- Location in Sarasota County and the state of Florida
- Coordinates: 27°17′12″N 82°29′58″W
- Country: United States
- State: Florida
- County: Sarasota

Area
  - Total: 1.81 sq mi (4.69 km^{2})
  - Land: 1.75 sq mi (4.53 km^{2})
  - Water: 0.066 sq mi (0.17 km^{2})
- Elevation: 30 ft (9.1 m)

Population (2020)
  - Total: 6,024
  - Density: 3,447.3/sq mi (1,331.02/km^{2})
- Time zone: UTC-5 (Eastern (EST))
  - Summer (DST): UTC-4 (EDT)
- FIPS code: 12-67450
- GNIS feature ID: 2402871

South Gate Ridge is a census-designated place (CDP) in Sarasota County, Florida, United States. The population was 6,024 at the 2020 census, up from 5,688 at the 2010 census. It is part of the North Port–Bradenton–Sarasota, Florida Metropolitan Statistical Area.

== Geography ==
According to the United States Census Bureau, the CDP has a total area of 1.8 square miles (4.7 km^{2}), of which 1.7 square miles (4.5 km^{2}) is land and 0.077 square miles (0.2 km^{2}), or 3.54%, is water.

== Demographics ==
Historical population
Census	Pop.	Note	%±
1970	2,043		—
1980	4,259		108.5%
1990	5,924		39.1%
2000	5,655		−4.5%
2010	5,688		0.6%
2020	6,024		5.9%

=== 2020 census ===
As of the 2020 census, South Gate Ridge had a population of 6,024.

The median age was 46.6 years. 17.5% of residents were under the age of 18 and 22.9% were 65 years of age or older. For every 100 females there were 91.9 males, and for every 100 females age 18 and over there were 88.6 males age 18 and over.

100.0% of residents lived in urban areas, while 0.0% lived in rural areas.

There were 2,615 households, of which 23.8% had children under the age of 18 living in them. Of all households, 41.7% were married-couple households, 20.9% were households with a male householder and no spouse or partner present, and 29.9% were households with a female householder and no spouse or partner present. About 31.6% of all households were made up of individuals, and 16.0% had someone living alone who was 65 years of age or older.

There were 2,878 housing units, of which 9.1% were vacant. The homeowner vacancy rate was 1.2% and the rental vacancy rate was 10.4%.

Racial composition as of the 2020 census
Race	Number	Percent
White	4,824	80.1%
Black or African American	100	1.7%
American Indian and Alaska Native	21	0.3%
Asian	116	1.9%
Native Hawaiian and Other Pacific Islander	7	0.1%
Some other race	315	5.2%
Two or more races	641	10.6%
Hispanic or Latino (of any race)	880	14.6%

=== Demographic estimates ===
According to Census Bureau QuickFacts estimates, 3.3% of the population was under age 5, 49.3% of residents were female, 327 veterans lived in the CDP, and 17.3% of residents were foreign born.

=== Income and poverty ===
The median household income was $66,910. About 10.7% of the population lived below the poverty threshold.

=== Technology access ===
About 95.4% of households had a computer, and 92.7% of households had a broadband internet subscription.
