= Garcon Point (Florida) =

Peninsula in northwest Florida, U.S.

Coordinates: 30.4764°N 87.0858°W

- Peninsula
- Interactive map of Garcon Point
- Offshore water bodies: Escambia Bay, Pensacola Bay, East Bay, Blackwater Bay

Garcon Point is a peninsula located south of Milton and directly across Escambia Bay from Pensacola.

== Roads ==
There are two major roads that link Garcon Point with the surrounding cities. Both of these roads have I-10 exits.

- Avalon Boulevard
- Garcon Point Road

== Environment ==
The area is mostly marsh and swamp and contains mostly pine trees. It also serves as an important watershed, filtering water for the surrounding bays and their ecosystems.

Garcon Point contains at least 13 endangered and or threatened plant and animal species. One notable species is the crimson pitcher plant.

There are 2.7 miles of nature and bike trails in the CDP, maintained by the Florida Trail Association.

== Demographics ==
The demographics of the Garcon Point, Florida CDP is as follows:

Population: 457 (2020)
Population Growth: 31.7% since 2010-2020

Garcon Point is home to several additional census designated places such as Dickerson City.
