= Gulf Gate Estates, Florida =

- Census-designated place
- Location in Sarasota County and the state of Florida
- Coordinates: 27°15′34″N 82°30′24″W
- Country: United States
- State: Florida
- County: Sarasota

Area
  - Total: 2.05 sq mi (5.32 km^{2})
  - Land: 1.99 sq mi (5.16 km^{2})
  - Water: 0.062 sq mi (0.16 km^{2})
- Elevation: 16 ft (4.9 m)

Population (2020)
  - Total: 11,118
  - Density: 3,682.8/sq mi (1,421.92/km^{2})
- Time zone: UTC-5 (Eastern (EST))
  - Summer (DST): UTC-4 (EDT)
- ZIP code: 34231
- Area code: 941
- FIPS code: 12-28050
- GNIS feature ID: 1867147

Gulf Gate Estates is a census-designated place (CDP) in Sarasota County, Florida, United States. The population was 11,118 at the 2020 census, up from 10,911 at the 2010 census. It is part of the North Port–Bradenton–Sarasota, Florida Metropolitan Statistical Area.

== Geography ==
According to the United States Census Bureau, the CDP has a total area of 2.8 square miles (7.3 km^{2}), of which 2.7 square miles (7.0 km^{2}) is land and 0.12 square miles (0.3 km^{2}), or 3.90%, is water.

== Demographics ==
Historical population
Census	Pop.	Note	%±
1970	1,483		—
1980	1,826		23.1%
1990	11,622		536.5%
2000	11,647		0.2%
2010	10,911		−6.3%
2020	7,340		−32.7%

Gulf Gate first appeared as a census designated place in the 2020 U.S. census.

As of the census of 2000, there were 11,647 people, 5,987 households, and 2,981 families residing in the CDP. The population density was 4,142.7 inhabitants per square mile (1,599.5/km^{2}). There were 6,720 housing units at an average density of 2,390.2 per square mile (922.9/km^{2}). The racial makeup of the CDP was 96.46% White, 0.78% African American, 0.21% Native American, 0.81% Asian, 0.03% Pacific Islander, 0.77% from other races, and 0.94% from two or more races. Hispanic or Latino of any race were 3.20% of the population.

There were 5,987 households, out of which 15.1% had children under the age of 18 living with them, 37.9% were married couples living together, 9.0% had a female householder with no husband present, and 50.2% were non-families. 41.9% of all households were made up of individuals, and 23.8% had someone living alone who was 65 years of age or older. The average household size was 1.89 and the average family size was 2.54.

In the CDP, the population was spread out, with 13.3% under the age of 18, 5.8% from 18 to 24, 23.4% from 25 to 44, 23.3% from 45 to 64, and 34.1% who were 65 years of age or older. The median age was 51 years. For every 100 females, there were 81.1 males. For every 100 females age 18 and over, there were 77.8 males.

The median income for a household in the CDP was $35,154, and the median income for a family was $44,716. Males had a median income of $29,801 versus $25,050 for females. The per capita income for the CDP was $24,199. About 3.3% of families and 5.9% of the population were below the poverty line, including 5.5% of those under age 18 and 6.4% of those age 65 or over.
