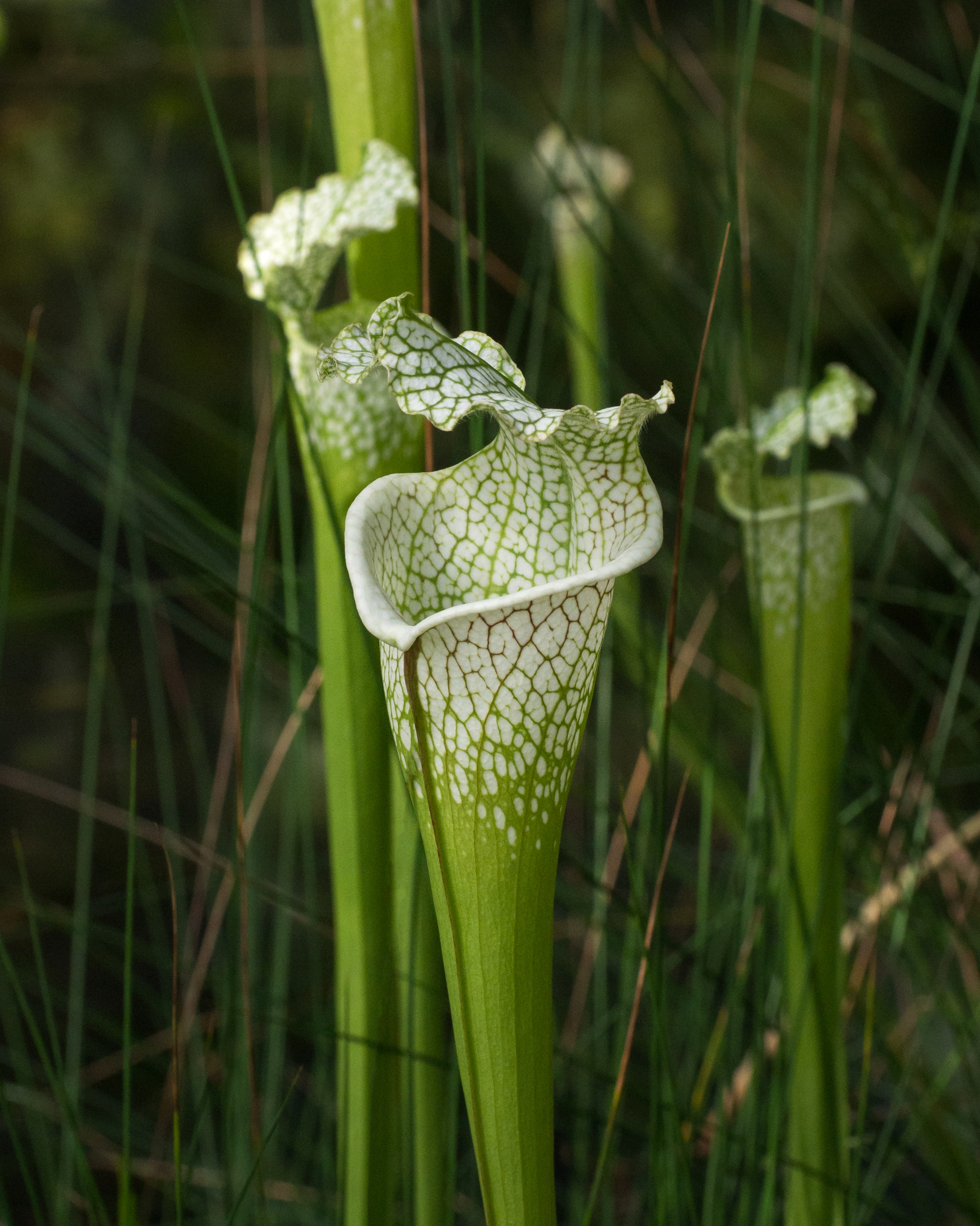

Conservation status
- Vulnerable (IUCN 2.3)

- Vulnerable (NatureServe)
- CITES Appendix II

Scientific classification
- Kingdom: Plantae
- Clade: Embryophytes
- Clade: Tracheophytes
- Clade: Angiosperms
- Clade: Eudicots
- Clade: Asterids
- Order: Ericales
- Family: Sarraceniaceae
- Genus: Sarracenia
- Species: S. leucophylla

Binomial name
- Sarracenia leucophylla Raf.
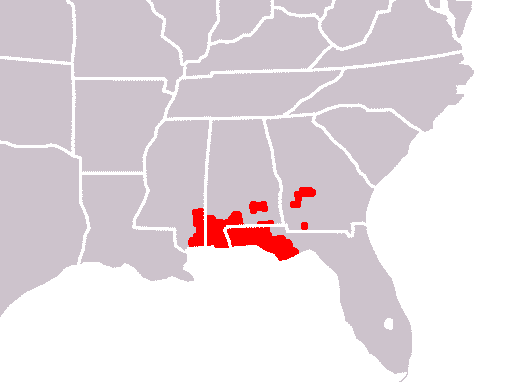
- Sarracenia leucophylla range

Synonyms
- Sarracenia leucophilla (lapsus); Sarracenia drummondii

= Sarracenia leucophylla =

Species of carnivorous plant

Sarracenia leucophylla, also known as the crimson pitcherplant, purple trumpet-leaf or white pitcherplant, is a carnivorous plant in the genus Sarracenia.

== Distribution ==
Like all the sarracenias, it is native to North America. The species is endemic to the Southeastern United States.

It inhabits moist and low-nutrient longleaf pine (Pinus palustris) savannas, primarily along the United States Gulf Coast, and generally west of the Apalachicola River on the Florida Panhandle. It is also found in Alabama, Georgia, Louisiana, Mississippi, and North Carolina.

In North Carolina it has apparently been introduced by humans to areas outside its native range.

== Description ==
Sarracenia leucophylla has nodding, brownish-red flowers and clusters of erect, hollow, pitcher-like leaves. Each leaf is colored at top with reddish-purple veins on a white background and topped by an erect, roundish, wavy-edged hood.

It is highly variable with respect to its height, with plants in some localities reaching almost 1 metre (3.3 ft) in height, while in others, plants can be diminutive. A seldom seen 30-centimetre (12 in) tall dwarf form is endemic to Garcon Point in Santa Rosa County, Florida.

== Conservation ==
The plant is a listed vulnerable species on the IUCN Red List of Threatened Species. The greatest threat to S. leucophylla, as is the case with most Sarracenia species, is loss of its unique wetland habitat to development along the Gulf Coast, as well as forest succession that was historically kept in check by natural wildfires.

It is also endangered from being one of the largest and showiest Sarracenia species, and is vulnerable to poachers of living plants and to the cut-floral trade for use in flower arrangements.

== Cultivation ==
Sarracenia leucophylla is cultivated as an ornamental plant. Despite its native range in the Southeastern U.S., it is remarkably hardy and can be grown outside even in USDA zones 6 and colder with careful winter protection. In cultivation it is generally less tolerant of stagnant water conditions and requires adequate soil drainage while still retaining requisite moisture levels to prevent root rot.

Several clones are recognized:

- 'Schnell's Ghost', a yellow-flowered clone with little red in the pitchers (though not anthocyanin free)
- 'Hurricane Creek White', a group of predominantly white plants from Hurricane Creek, AL
- 'Tarnok', a mutant form which produces a showy, although sterile, double flower
- 'Titan', an especially tall and robust form that may produce fall pitchers greater than 38 inches (97 cm) in height.

== Gallery ==
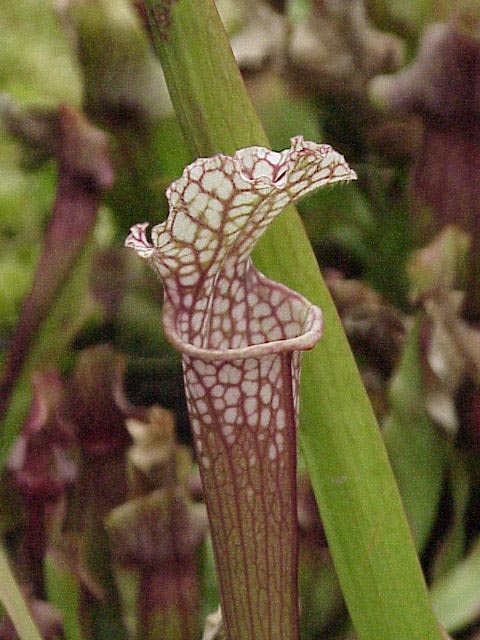

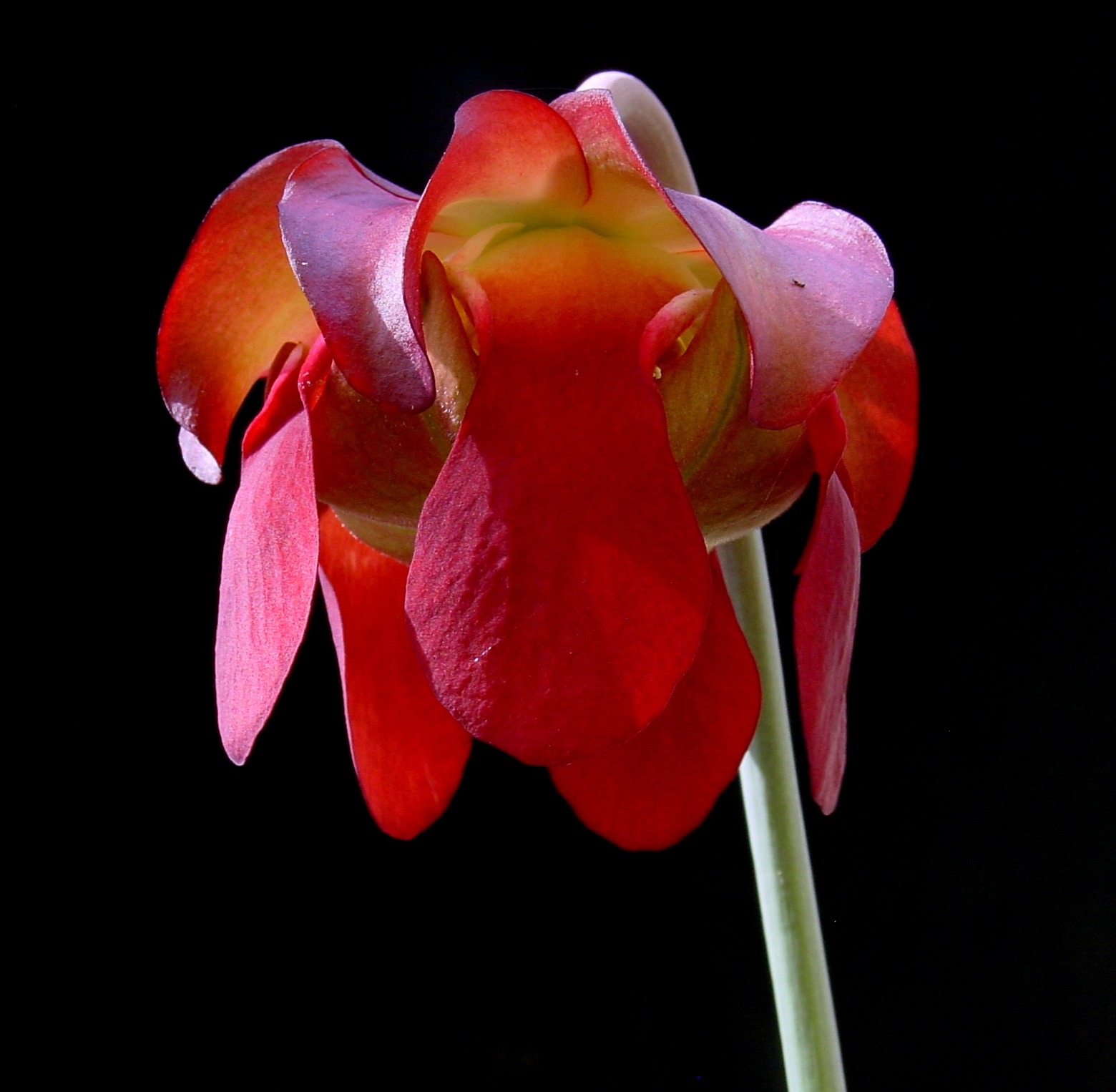

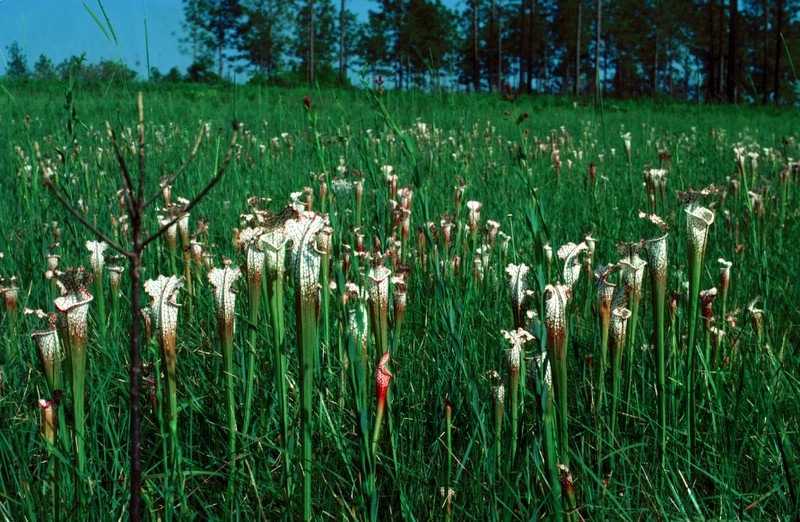

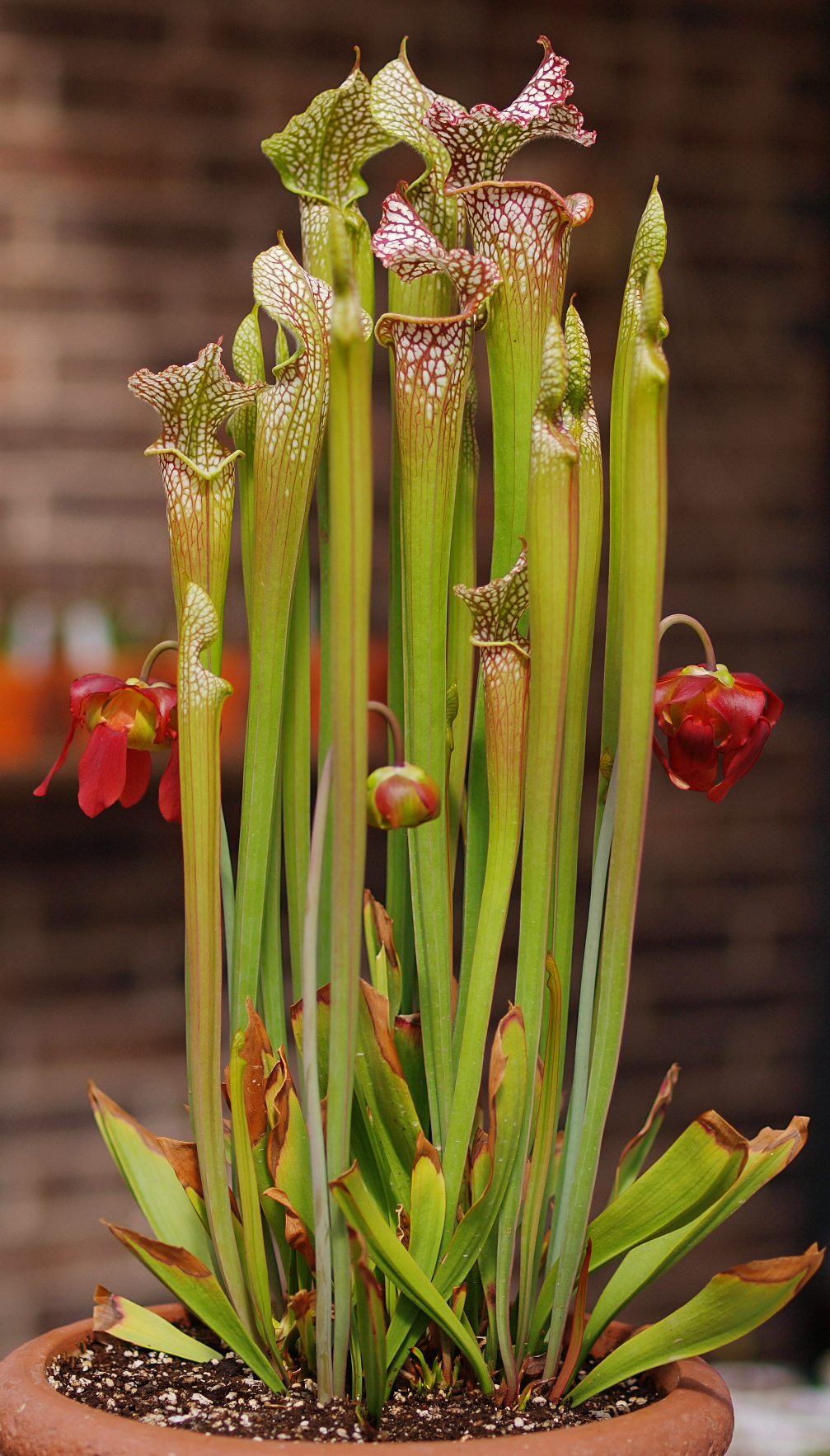
In cultivation

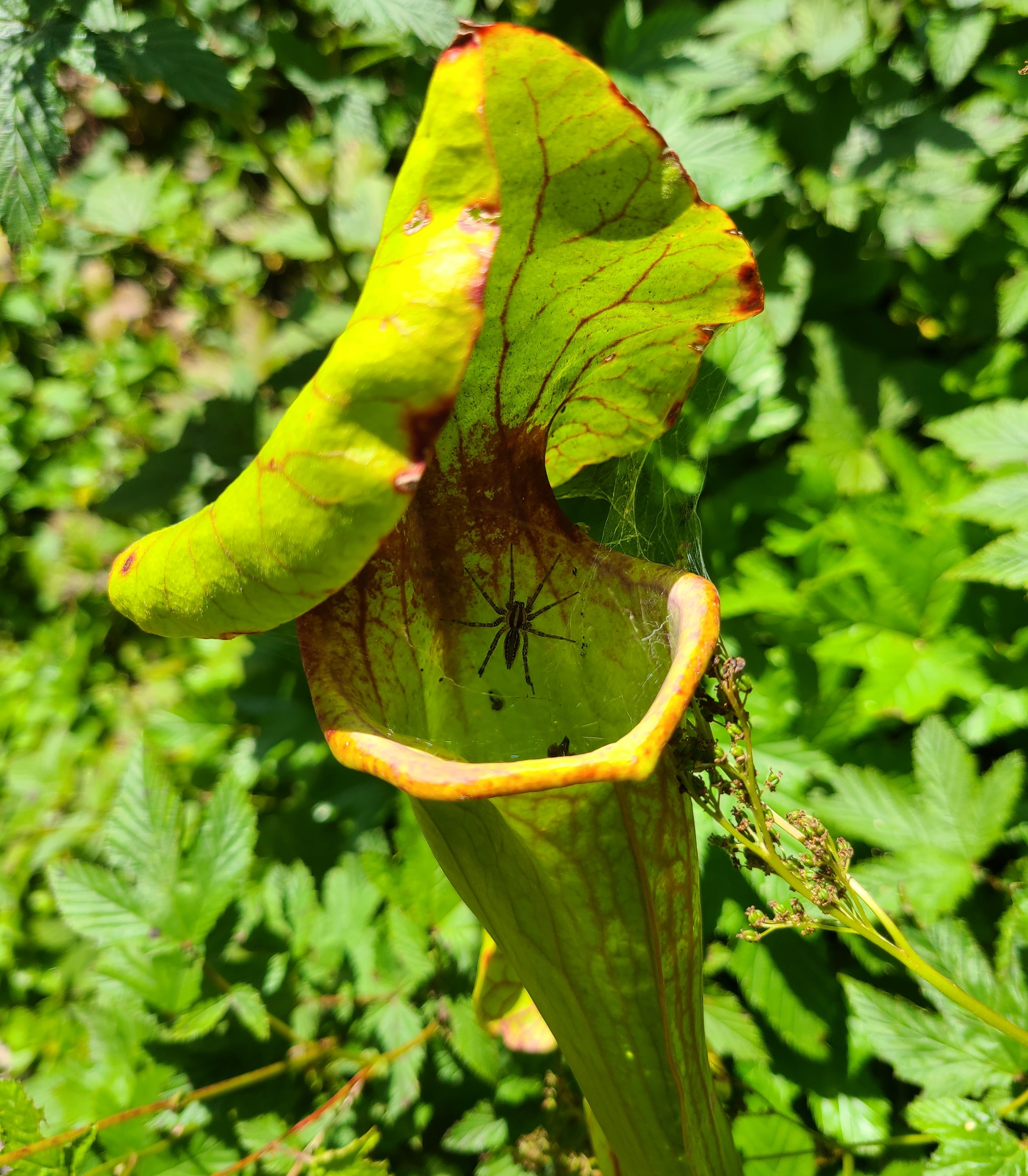
White trumpet pitcherplant in Madison, Wisconsin

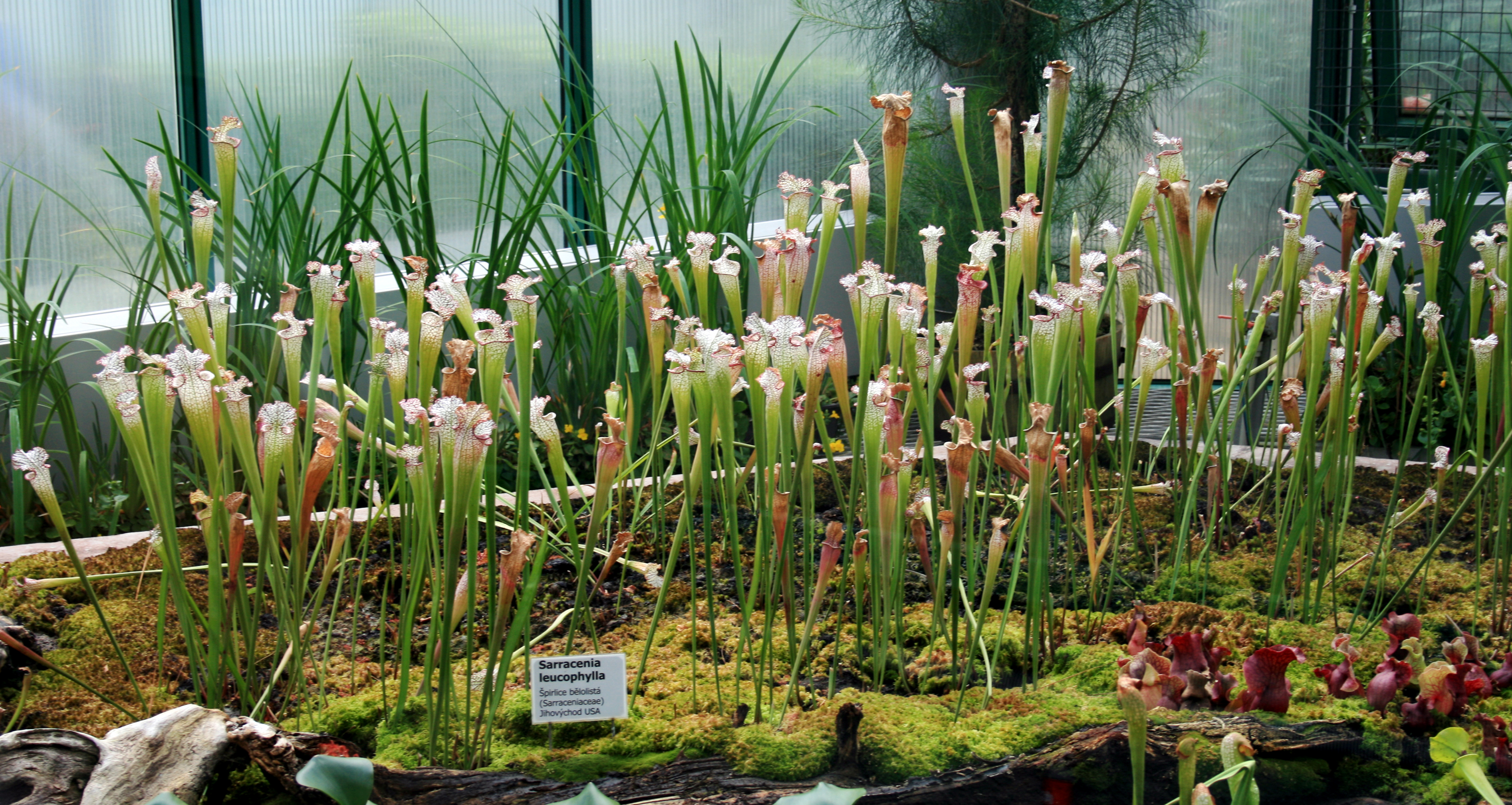
At Liberec Botanical Garden, Czechia

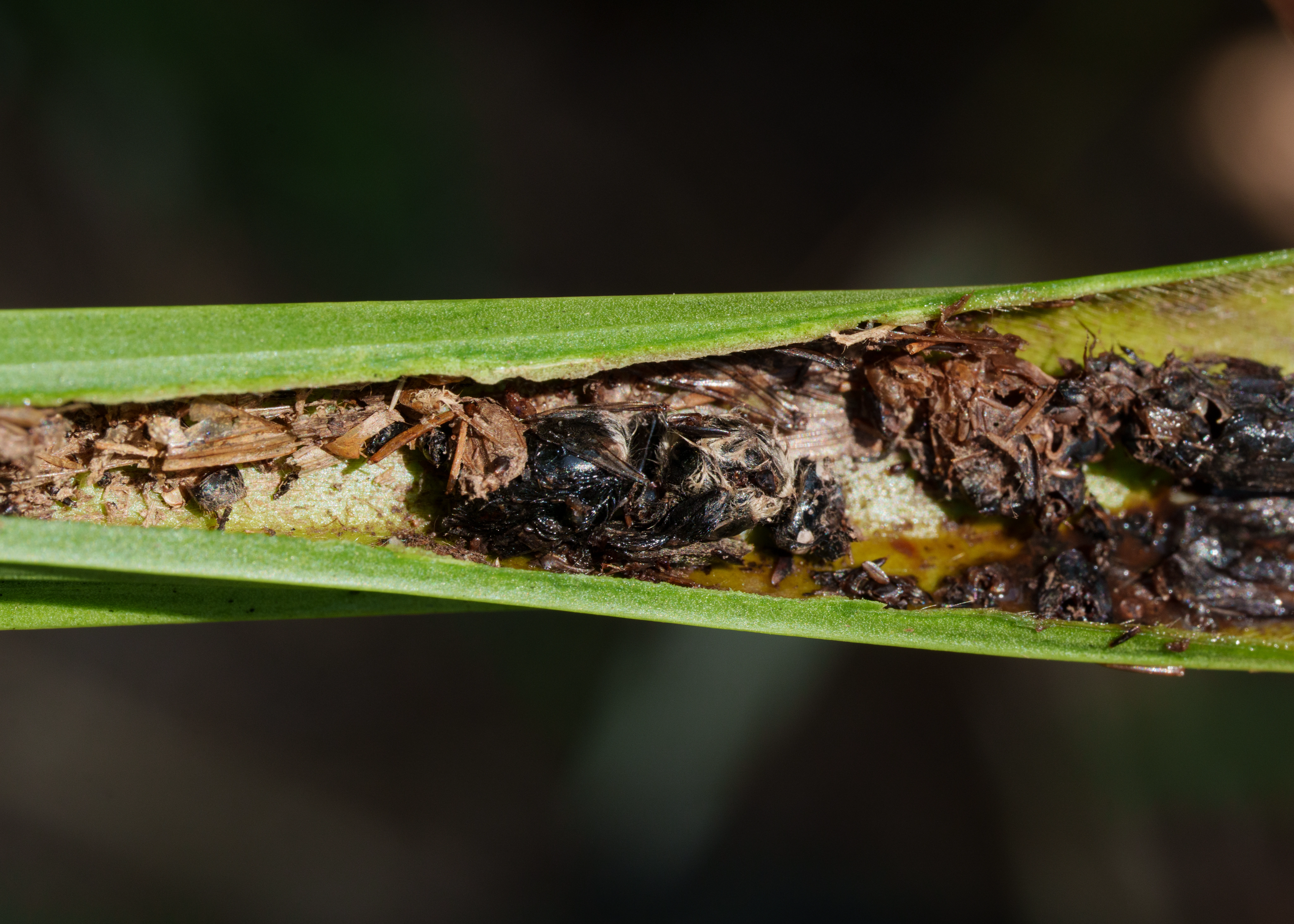
Partially digested meal inside plant, Georgia
