= List of county roads in DeSoto County, Florida =

- County road shields used in Florida

Highway names
- Interstates: Interstate X (I-X)
- US Highways: U.S. Highway X (US X)
- State: State Road X (SR X)
- County: County Road X (CR X)

System links
- County roads in Florida; County roads in DeSoto County

The following numbered county roads exist in DeSoto County, Florida. As with most Florida counties, numbers are assigned in a statewide grid.

== County road list ==
#	Name	From	To	Notes
CR 35A	SW Senate Street / SW Hull Avenue	US 17 (SR 35) in Fort Ogden	US 17 (SR 35) east-northeast of Hull	Former SR 35A
CR 660	Moore Avenue / Northeast McIntyre Street	US 17 (SR 35) / SE McKay Street in Cubitis	NE Cubitis Avenue north-northeast of Cubitis	Former SR 660; FDOT's DeSoto County map indicates that CR 660's northern terminus is at a second intersection with US 17 (SR 35), but road signs on US 17 (SR 35) indicate that it continues to NE Cubitis Avenue.
CR 661		CR 760 / SW Stroble Avenue west-northwest of Nocatee SR 70 northwest of Arcadia	SR 72 west of Arcadia CR 661 / NW Kinsey County Line Road at the Hardee County line north of Arcadia	Former SR 661
CR 661A		SR 70 west of Arcadia	NW Coker Street northwest of Arcadia	Former SR 661A
CR 760		CR 769 west-northwest of Nocatee SR 31 southeast of Southeast Arcadia	US 17 (SR 35) / SW Welles Avenue in Nocatee SR 70 east of Arcadia	Former SR 760
CR 760A		US 17 / SW McCaskill Street southwest of Nocatee	SR 31 east of Nocatee	Former SR 760A
CR 761		US 17 / SW Madison Avenue east of Southfort	CR 769 in Platt	Former SR 761
CR 763	SE North Hog Bay Extension	SR 31 southeast of Southeast Arcadia	SR 31 / East Farms Road south-southeast of Nocatee	Former SR 763
CR 769		CR 769 / SW Courtly Manor Drive at the Charlotte County line south of Lake Suzy	SR 72 west-southwest of Arcadia	Former SR 741 (south of CR 761) and SR 761 (north of CR 761)
