= Tampa Bay Rays Radio Network =

Radio network in the United States

The Tampa Bay Rays Radio Network is a radio network in the southeastern United States that broadcasts baseball games and related programming for the Tampa Bay Rays of Major League Baseball. Additionally, there is a 2-station Spanish language network. Since 2009, WDAE/620 in St. Petersburg, Florida, has served as the flagship station for the network.

In addition, WGES/680 in St. Petersburg, Florida airs games in Spanish but is not part of the network.

== Announcers ==
Paul Olden and Charlie Slowes were the Devil Rays' original radio team, broadcasting games from the teams' first season in 1998 through the 2004 season.

Andy Freed and Dave Wills formed a new radio team beginning in 2005. Freed had worked in sports broadcasting covering many sports, most recently for the Pawsox Radio Network and Trenton Thunder, while Wills had spent 11 years as a pre and post-game host on the Chicago White Sox radio network after having previously been the radio voice of the Kane County Cougars. The two worked together for 18 season and were voted the best radio team in the American League in a 2020 poll. However, the partnership ended suddenly when Wills died just before the start of the 2023 season.

Neil Solondz joined the Rays Radio Network in 2012 as a pregame and postgame show host after having spent the previous eight years as the radio voice of the Durham Bulls, the Rays' Triple-A affiliate. Following the death of Dave Wills, Solondz was promoted to join Andy Freed in the radio booth.

On the Spanish broadcasts, Ricardo Tavaras does play-by-play and Enrique Oliu provides color commentary.

== Stations ==
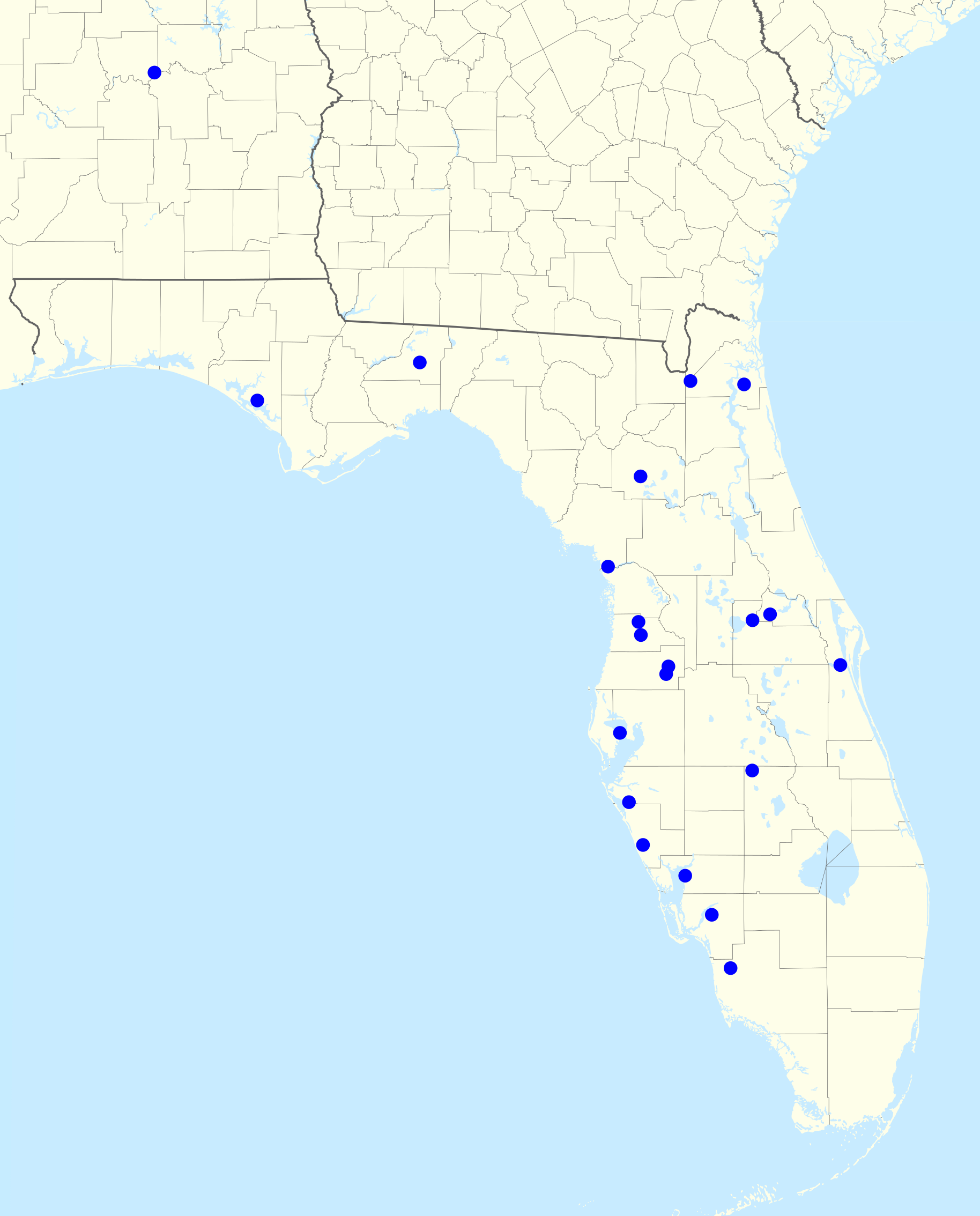
Map of radio affiliates

Stations are current as of the 2021 season.

City	Callsign	Frequency
St. Petersburg	WDAE	620 AM
Arcadia	WCXS	1480 AM
Bradenton	WWPR	1490 AM
Brooksville	WWJB	1450 AM
Dade City	WDCF	1350 AM
Ormond Beach	WELE	1380 AM
Englewood	WENG	1530 AM
North Fort Myers	WBCN	770 AM
Gainesville	WRUF	850 AM
Homosassa	WWJB	99.9 FM
Fernandina Beach	WYKB	105.3 FM
Orlando	WYGM	740 AM
Pascagoula, Mississippi	WPMO	1580 AM
Pensacola, Florida/Mobile, Alabama	WJNZ	1000 AM
Port Charlotte	W251CU	98.1 FM
Spring Hill	W280DK	103.9 FM
St. Petersburg	WGES	680 AM (Spanish)
Zephyrhills	WZHR	1400 AM

=== Former affiliates ===
- WFLA (AM)/970: Tampa (Original flagship station)
- WORL/660: Altamonte Springs/Orlando (–2019)
- WFLN/1480: Arcadia, Florida (?-2012)
- WHOO/1080: Kissimmee, Florida (?-2012)
- WGMW/99.5: LaCrosse, Florida/Gainesville (?-2009)
- WJBX/770: North Fort Myers, Florida (?-2012)
- WHOO/1080: Orlando (?-2012)
- WJUA/1200: Pine Island Center/Ft. Myers (2013)
- WSTU/1450: Stuart, Florida (?-2012)
- WIXC/1060: Titusville, Florida (~2008)
- KLRG/880: Little Rock (2013-)
- WIQR/1410: Prattville, Alabama (?-2016)
- WWCN/99.3: Fort Myers, Florida

== See also ==
- List of Tampa Bay Rays broadcasters
- List of XM Satellite Radio channels
- List of Sirius Satellite Radio stations
