= 1530 AM =

AM radio frequency

The following radio stations broadcast on AM frequency 1530 kHz: 1530 AM is a United States clear-channel frequency. KFBK Sacramento and WCKY Cincinnati share Class A status on 1530 AM.

Because 1530 kHz is a multiple of both 9 and 10, the frequency is available for use by broadcast stations in all three ITU regions.

== Angola ==
- D3RW in Cabinda

== Argentina ==
- LRJ200 in Morteros, Cordoba
- Esencia in San Miguel, Buenos Aires

== Australia ==
- 2VM in Moree, NSW
- ARDS in Darwin, NT

== Bolivia ==
- CP111 in San Borja
- CP200 in Llica

== Chile ==
- CA-153 in Copiapo
- CB-153 in Quillota
- CC-153 in Coronel
- CD-153 in Calbuco
- CD-153 in Chile Chico

== China ==
- Zhejiang News Radio in Hangzhou

== Colombia ==
- HJDN in Medellín
- HKN70 in Murindó
- HJD26 in San Pedro de Urabá
- HJGD in Chiquinquirá
- HKR73 in Guapi
- HJOZ in San Juan del Cesar
- HKV82 in Puerto Lleras
- HJEU in Sevilla (formerly HJJB)
- HJPE in Melgar

== Cuba ==
- CMIX in Moron, Ciego de Ávila.

== Ecuador ==
- HCJY1 in La Concordia
- HCMC2 in Libertad
- HCMZ6 in Pelileo
- HCNI4 in San Lorenzo
- HCVP5 in Pallatanga
- HCCC5 in Azogues

== Iceland ==
- TFK in Keflavik

== Indonesia ==
- PM2B... in Jakarta
- PM3EXB in Kupang

== Iran ==
- EPE-... in Yazd

== Mexico ==
- XESD-AM in León, Guanajuato, licensed in Silao, Guanajuato
- XEUR-AM in Mexico City

== New Zealand ==
- ZL2YP in Bell Block / Taranaki / Pakipaki

== Peru ==
- OBZ4S in Huayucachi

== Philippines ==
- DZME in Metro Manila

== Portugal ==
=== Madeira ===
- CSB91 in Funchal

== Rwanda ==
- 9XG in Gitarama

== Thailand ==
- HSJZ-AM in Uttaradit

== United States ==
Stations in bold are clear-channel stations.

Call sign	City of license	Facility ID	Class	Daytime power (kW)	Nighttime power (kW)	Critical hours power (kW)	Transmitter coordinates
KDSN	Denison, Iowa	39380	D	0.5	0.013		42.036111°N 95.328889°W
**KFBK**	Sacramento, California	10145	A	50	50		38.848333°N 121.482778°W
KQNK	Norton, Kansas	52681	D	1			39.826944°N 99.868889°W
KQSC	Colorado Springs, Colorado	33731	D	15	0.015	1	38.818889°N 104.775556°W
KVDW	England, Arkansas	40745	D	2.5		0.27	34.545833°N 91.984444°W
KXTD	Wagoner, Oklahoma	61985	D	5			35.975°N 95.491667°W
KYWW	Harlingen, Texas	67067	B	50	10	50	26.375833°N 97.895278°W
KZNX	Creedmoor, Texas	38906	D	10	0.22	1	30.077222°N 97.635556°W (daytime and critical hours); 30.345556°N 97.634444°W (nighttime)
WASC	Spartanburg, South Carolina	48629	D	1		0.25	34.949444°N 81.959167°W
WCKG	Elmhurst, Illinois	32227	D	0.36			41.8675°N 87.918611°W
**WCKY**	Cincinnati, Ohio	51722	A	50	50		39.068611°N 84.605556°W (daytime); 39.065278°N 84.6075°W (nighttime)
WCTR	Chestertown, Maryland	34030	D	1		0.27	39.226389°N 76.088889°W
WENG	Englewood, Florida	47073	D	1	0.001		26.970833°N 82.323333°W
WFIC	Collinsville, Virginia	59418	D	1		0.25	36.715556°N 79.920833°W
WLCO	Lapeer, Michigan	14225	D	5			43.026389°N 83.286667°W
WLIQ	Quincy, Illinois	52576	D	1.4		0.29	39.930833°N 91.429444°W
WLLQ	Chapel Hill, North Carolina	9068	D	10			35.968611°N 79.002778°W
WOBX	Wanchese, North Carolina	73367	D	0.25			35.864444°N 75.65°W
WTTI	Dalton, Georgia	53957	D	10		10	34.785833°N 85.044444°W
WUPR	Utuado, Puerto Rico	9791	B	1	0.25		18.267778°N 66.709722°W
WVBF	Middleborough Center, Massachusetts	63403	D	5	0.004	0.94	41.882222°N 71.063889°W (daytime and nighttime); 41.923889°N 70.935278°W (critical hours)
WYGR	Wyoming, Michigan	74248	D	0.5		0.25	42.927222°N 85.747222°W
WYMM	Jacksonville, Florida	11127	D	50			30.363889°N 81.748333°W
WZTE	Union City, Pennsylvania	26610	D	4.8		0.25	41.940833°N 79.845°W

== Vatican City ==
- HV100 in Santa Maria di Galeria

== Uruguay ==
- CX50 in Montevideo
- CX153 in Nueva Palmir
