= Micajah T. Singleton House =

Historic house in Florida, United States

- U.S. National Register of Historic Places
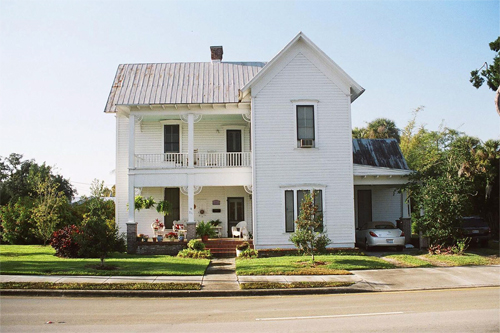
- Micajah T. Singleton House

- Location within Florida
- Location: 711 W. Hickory Street; Arcadia, Florida
- Coordinates: 27°13′11″N 81°52′08″W
- Built: 1891
- Architectural style: Frame Vernacular
- NRHP reference No.: 13000578
- Added to NRHP: August 6, 2013

The Micajah T. Singleton House is an historic 1891 residence in DeSoto County, Florida. It is located in Arcadia, Florida at 711 West Hickory Street. It was added to the National Register of Historic Places on August 6, 2013.

The home is one of the few remaining examples in Arcadia of a large, frame vernacular architecture, pioneer home. It was constructed of heart yellow pine.

Micajah T. Singleton (1850-1923) was from a prominent North Georgia family and came to Arcadia in 1888 to operate the Peace River Phosphate Company. When the phosphate boom busted, the Singleton family left Arcadia in 1893.

== See also ==
- Arcadia Historic District
- National Register of Historic Places listings in DeSoto County, Florida
