= WTMY =

- Sarasota, Florida; United States
- Broadcast area: Sarasota metropolitan area
- Frequency: 1280 kHz
- Branding: La Numero Uno 1

Programming
- Format: Regional Mexican

Ownership
- Owner: Tomas Martinez and Mercedes Soler; (Solmart Media, LLC)
- Sister stations: WZSP

History
- First air date: December 2, 1961
- Former call signs: WYND (1960-1980); WWZZ (1980–1988); WSGX (1988–1991)

Technical information
- Licensing authority: FCC
- Facility ID: 51440
- Class: D
- Power: 300 watts day 100 watts night
- Transmitter coordinates: 27°21′21.00″N 82°29′13.00″W
- Translator: 99.1 W256DI (Sarasota)
- Repeater: 105.3 WZSP-HD2 (Nocatee, Florida)

Links
- Public license information: Public file; LMS
- Webcast: Listen Live
- Website: lanumero1.fm

WTMY (1280 AM) is a commercial radio station, licensed to Sarasota, Florida, and broadcasting a Regional Mexican radio format. It is owned by Tomas Martinez and Mercedes Soler with the license held by Solmart Media, LLC. The studios are on Honore Avenue in the Fruitville section of Sarasota.

WTMY is a Class B AM station. By day, it transmits with 300 watts, but to protect other stations on 1280 AM from interference at night, it reduces power to 100 watts. The transmitter is on City Island near Longboat Key in Sarasota. WTMY simulcasts on 165-watt FM translator W256DI on 99.1 MHz. The translator's transmitter is on Honore Avenue at Fruitville Road. Programming is also heard on the HD Radio digital subchannel of sister station WZSP at 105.3 FM-HD2.

== History ==
The station signed on the air on December 2, 1961. Its original call sign was WYND. It was owned by Kelsey Hutchinson of Gulf Coast Broadcasting. On November 1, 1966 it switched to a top 40 format called Surf Row Radio. In 1980, WUND was bought by Sun Broadcasting and changed its call letters to WWZZ. In 1988, WWZZ changed its call letters to WSGX. As WSGX, the station was broadcasting in AM Stereo. In 2011, the station became a Fox Sports Radio network affiliate.

In October 2013, the station changed to adult standards and big band hits. The on-air staff included Eugene Dolan, Doug Miles, Smilin' Lou Powers, with shows such as "Big Band Wakeup Call", "Sunshine Music Memories with Smilin' Lou Powers", "Big Band Files with Doug Miles", "The Sounds of Sinatra with Sid Mark", "Milkman's Serenade" with Eugene Dolan, "Those Were the Days" with Danny Lane, "Swing Street" with Kevin Hayes, Artist Spotlight with Doug Miles, contributor Don Henderson, "Your Hit Parade" with Bea Wain and Andre Baruch, and Old Time Radio Classics with Will Rogers. Betty Comora was Creative Director.

"Artist Spotlight with Doug Miles" guests include: Cynthia Sayer, Liz Callaway, Dick Hyman, Patti LuPone, Steve Lawrence, John O’Hurley, Jack Jones, Sandy Stewart, Judy Carmichael, Linda Purl, Sid Mark, Audrey Landers, Deana Martin, Larry Kane, Mark Russell, Stephanie Trick, Kitt Moran, Julie Budd, Ann Hampton Callaway, Dennis Bono, Michael Feinstein, Sarasota Jazz Project Big Band, Ken Loomer Big Band, and Ocean's Eleven Big Band.

On August 8, 2016, the station was sold by Southwest Florida Radio Broadcasting LLC to Solmart Media for $125,000. The format was changed to Spanish language programming, simulcasting then-sister station WZZS in Zolfo Springs, Florida. Eventually, WTMY began airing its own Regional Mexican format. On April 4, 2019, the station added an FM translator, W256DI on 99.1 MHz.
