= WSRQ =

WSRQ may refer to:

- WSRQ (AM), a radio station (1220 AM) licensed to serve Sarasota, Florida, United States
- WSRQ-FM, a radio station (106.9 FM) licensed to serve Zolfo Springs, Florida
- WSDV, a radio station (1450 AM) licensed to serve Sarasota, Florida, which held the call sign WSRQ from 2003 to 2006
- WOUF (FM), a defunct radio station (100.1 FM) formerly licensed to serve Bear Lake, Michigan, United States, which held the call sign WSRQ from 1999 to 2001
