= Cubitis, Florida =

Unincorporated community in Florida, US

Cubitis is an unincorporated community in DeSoto County, Florida, United States. It is located approximately 2 miles (3.2 km) north of Arcadia on U.S. Route 17.

== Geography ==
Cubitis is located at 27°15′36″N 81°50′26″W, its elevation 62 feet (19 m).
