= Jim Yarbrough (offensive lineman) =

American football player (born 1946)

No. 75
- Position: Offensive tackle

Personal information
- Born: October 28, 1946 (age 80); Charlotte, North Carolina, U.S.
- Listed height: 6 ft 5 in (1.96 m)
- Listed weight: 265 lb (120 kg)

Career information
- High school: DeSoto County (Arcadia, Florida)
- College: Florida (1965-1968)
- NFL draft: 1969: 2nd round, 47th overall pick

Career history
- Detroit Lions (1969–1978); Philadelphia Eagles (1979)*
- * Offseason or practice squad member only

Awards and highlights
- University of Florida Athletic Hall of Fame

Career NFL statistics
- Games played: 112
- Games started: 77
- Fumble recoveries: 4
- Stats at Pro Football Reference

James Kelley Yarbrough (born October 28, 1946) is an American former professional football player who was an offensive lineman for nine seasons in the National Football League (NFL) during the 1960s and 1970s. Yarbrough played college football for the Florida Gators. A second-round pick in the 1969 NFL/AFL draft, he played his entire professional career for the NFL's Detroit Lions.

== Early life ==
Yarbrough was born in Charlotte, North Carolina. He grew up in Arcadia, Florida, where he attended DeSoto County High School, and played high school football for the DeSoto Bulldogs. Yarbrough was an offensive end, doubled on defense as a roving "monster man" linebacker, and also kicked most of the extra points for the Bulldogs. He was also a shot-putter on the DeSoto County High School track team and center on the basketball team.

== College career ==
Yarbrough accepted an athletic scholarship to attend the University of Florida in Gainesville, Florida, where he played for coach Ray Graves' Gators football teams from 1966 to 1968. He was a sophomore starter for the Steve Spurrier-led squad that won the first major bowl game in Gators history when they defeated the Georgia Tech Yellow Jackets 27–12 to win the 1967 Orange Bowl.

Yarbrough returned to Florida during the NFL off-season to complete his bachelor's degree in marketing in 1971, and he was later inducted into the University of Florida Athletic Hall of Fame as a "Gator Great." In a 2006 article series written for The Gainesville Sun, he was ranked among the 100 greatest Gator football players of all time (No. 98). In the fall of 1999 Yarbrough was named as the Tight End on the Gators All-Century team as chosen by Gator fans and organized by the Gainesville Sun.

== Professional career ==
The Detroit Lions chose Yarbrough in the second round (47th pick overall) of the 1969 NFL/AFL draft, and he played his entire nine-season professional career for the Lions as an offensive tackle from 1969 to 1977. He became a regular starter at left tackle in his third season, 1971.

== See also ==
- Florida Gators football, 1960–69
- List of Detroit Lions players
- List of Florida Gators in the NFL draft
- List of University of Florida alumni
- List of University of Florida Athletic Hall of Fame members
