= Weng =

Weng may refer to:

- Weng (surname), a Chinese surname
- Weng, Bavaria, a municipality in the district of Landshut, Bavaria, Germany
- Weng im Innkreis, a municipality in the district of Braunau am Inn, Upper Austria, Austria
- Weng im Gesäuse, a former municipality in the district of Liezen, Styria, Austria
- WENG, a radio station in Englewood, Florida, United States
