= List of Tampa Bay Rays broadcasters =

Broadcasters for the Tampa Bay Rays Major League Baseball team.

== Television ==
=== Play by Play ===
- Dewayne Staats (1998–present)
- Todd Kalas (1998–2016)
- Rich Hollenberg (2014–present)
- Kevin Burkhardt (2019)
- Andy Freed (2023–present)

=== Color Commentary ===
- Joe Magrane (1998–2008)
- Kevin Kennedy (2009–2010)
- Brian Anderson (2008–present)
- Orestes Destrade (2011–2023)
- Doug Waechter (2015–present)

=== Host ===
- Todd Kalas (1998–2016)
- Rich Hollenberg (2014–present)

== Radio ==
- Paul Olden (1998–2004)
- Charlie Slowes (1998–2004)
- Andy Freed (2005–present)
- Dave Wills (2005–2023)
- Neil Solondz (2023–present)
- Doug Waechter (2023-present)
- Chris Adams-Wall (2023-present)

== Spanish Radio ==
=== Play by Play ===
- Enrique Oliu (2001–present)
- Danny Martinez (2003–2004)
- José Rafael Colmenares Anzola (2005)
- Ricardo Tavaras (2006–Present)

=== Color Commentary ===
- Enrique Oliu (2003–present)
- Leonte Landino (2004)

== See also ==
- Tampa Bay Rays Radio Network
- List of current Major League Baseball announcers
