= Johnson-Smith House =

Historic house in Florida, United States

- U.S. National Register of Historic Places
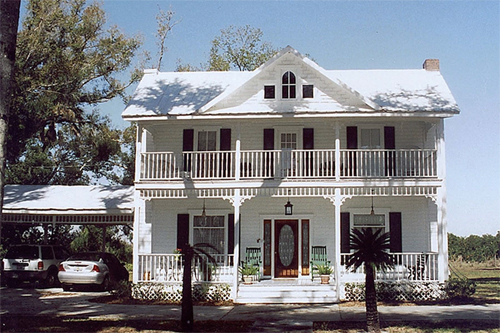
- Johnson-Smith House

- Location within Florida
- Location: 1519 North Arcadia Avenue; Arcadia, Florida
- Coordinates: 27°14′10″N 81°51′29″W
- Architectural style: Folk Victorian
- NRHP reference No.: 13000163
- Added to NRHP: April 16, 2013

The Johnson-Smith House is a historic property in DeSoto County, Florida. It is listed on the National Register of Historic Places. It is a late 19th-century two-story Folk Victorian architecture residence (c. 1892). appearance. It was added to the National Register on April 16, 2013. The home is located at 1519 North Arcadia Avenue in Arcadia, Florida.

== See also ==
- National Register of Historic Places listings in DeSoto County, Florida
