= WCTR =

WCTR may refer to:

- WCTR (AM), a radio station (1530 AM) licensed to Chestertown, Maryland, United States
- West Coast Talk Radio, a radio station on the Grand Theft Auto: San Andreas & Grand Theft Auto V soundtrack
- CharterTV3, a regional cable television station in Worcester, Massachusetts, United States, also known as WCTR-TV3
- WCTU Railway
- World Touring Car Cup, abbreviated to WTCR, referring to the use of TCR regulations, an international touring car championship in motorsport
