= WZSP =

Coordinates: 27.184°N 81.949°W

- Nocatee, Florida; United States
- Broadcast area: De Soto County
- Frequency: 105.3 MHz (HD Radio)
- Branding: La Zeta 105.3

Programming
- Format: Regional Mexican
- Subchannels: HD2: WTMY simulcast

Ownership
- Owner: Tomas Martinez and Mercedes Soler; (Solmart Media, LLC)
- Sister stations: WTMY

History
- First air date: August 27, 1998

Technical information
- Licensing authority: FCC
- Facility ID: 85759
- Class: A
- ERP: 6,000 watts
- HAAT: 122 meters (400 ft)

Links
- Public license information: Public file; LMS
- Webcast: Listen Live
- Website: lazeta.fm

WZSP (105.3 FM "La Zeta 105.3") is a commercial radio station licensed to Nocatee, Florida, serving De Soto County and Arcadia. It is owned by Solmart Media, LLC, headed by Tomas Martinez and Mercedes Soler. WZSP broadcasts a Regional Mexican radio format from studios and offices in Sarasota.

WZSP has an effective radiated power (ERP) of 6,000 watts. The transmitter is on Addison Avenue in Arcadia.
