= Nocatee, Florida (disambiguation) =

There are two communities in Florida that use the name Nocatee:

- Nocatee, DeSoto County, Florida
- Nocatee, St. Johns County, Florida
