= WCKG =

- Elmhurst, Illinois; United States
- Broadcast area: Chicago metropolitan area
- Frequency: 1530 kHz
- Branding: Sportsbook Radio Chicago

Programming
- Format: Sports
- Affiliations: Fox Sports Radio

Ownership
- Owner: Arthur Dubiel; (DuPage Radio, LLC)

History
- First air date: October 10, 1974
- Former call signs: WKDC (1974–1994); WJJG (1994–2012)
- Call sign meaning: Will, Cook, Kane, DuPage (also heritage calls for WCFS-FM)

Technical information
- Licensing authority: FCC
- Facility ID: 32227
- Class: D
- Power: 360 watts (days only)
- Transmitter coordinates: 41°51′46.00″N 87°55′26.00″W
- Translator: 102.3 W272DQ (Elmhurst)

Links
- Public license information: Public file; LMS
- Webcast: Listen live
- Website: wckg.com

WCKG (1530 kHz) is a commercial AM radio station licensed to Elmhurst, Illinois, and serving the Chicago metropolitan area. It broadcasts a sports radio format and is owned by DuPage Radio, LLC. WCKG is a Fox Sports Radio affiliate. It also carries the nationally syndicated Ramsey Show with Dave Ramsey and some brokered programming.

WCKG is powered at 360 watts and is a daytimer station. Because 1530 AM is a clear channel frequency reserved for Class A stations WCKY Cincinnati and KFBK Sacramento, WCKG must go off the air at sunset to avoid interference. The transmitter is alongside Interstate 88 on Forest Lane. Programming is heard around the clock on 90-watt FM translator W272DQ at 102.3 MHz in Elmhurst. The previous site in Elmurst was a KINSTAR array with wires slung between wooden poles.

== History ==
=== WKDC ===
AM 1530 signed on the air October 10, 1974. The station's call sign was originally WKDC representing the signal coverage in Will, Kane, DuPage and Cook counties. It ran 250 watts, during daytime hours only, and aired a middle of the road (MOR) format. It was owned by Frank and Lois Blotter, operating as DuPage County Broadcasters. The studios were built for stereo (Cetec Sparta stereo audio equipment) although it was not until 1976 when the FCC authorized the station to test AM stereo. Daytime and night-time findings on AM stereo were presented at the 1977 NAB Convention in Washington, DC.

In 1981, the station was sold to Robert Snyder's Snyder Broadcasting for $1 million, and it began airing show tunes. Snyder Broadcasting filed for bankruptcy on December 29, 1982, and the station was taken off the air in October 1983 and remained off the air for over a year until it was repurchased by Frank and Lois Blotter. When it returned to the air, it began airing beautiful music and adult standards. By the early 1990s, it was airing ethnic programming and big band music.

=== WJJG ===
In 1994, the station was sold to Joe Gentile for $700,000 and its call sign was changed to WJJG. The call letters stood for owner Joseph J. Gentile. Joe's nickname was "The Baron of Barrington," where he owned a Chrysler-Plymouth dealership for many years.

Gentile hosted a program on weekday mornings, featuring talk and adult standards. The station also featured brokered programming, including a show hosted by John H. Cox, syndicated talk shows, and The Sounds of Sinatra with Sid Mark.

=== WCKG ===
On September 19, 2012, AM 1530 changed its call letters to WCKG. In 2013, the station was sold to DuPage Radio, LLC for $290,000. Arthur Dubiel is the majority owner, and his son, Matt runs the station.

On June 27, 2017, the FCC approved WCKG to move its FM translator, W272DQ, to the top of Trump Tower in Chicago.

On April 23, 2018, WCKG changed their format from news/talk/variety to sports, with programming from Fox Sports Radio.

On March 10, 2020, WCKG launched new "Sportsbook Radio Chicago" branding, shifting its focus to content related to sports betting. The station reverted to its previous branding on March 30 due to the COVID-19 pandemic, but later restored the new branding.

In March 2021, WCKG asked the FCC to lower its power to 190 watts and operate using a long wire antenna, as the State of Illinois enacted eminent domain over its tower site for highway use. With the powerful Cincinnati AM radio station on the same channel, the coverage area of the station was greatly diminished. Its construction permit for 4,000 watts also expired, due to the fact that the loss of its transmitter site prevented the power increase.

== Translator ==
The station is also heard on 102.3 FM through translator W272DQ in Elmhurst.

Broadcast translator for WCKG
| Call sign | Frequency | City of license | FID | ERP (W) | HAAT | Class | Transmitter coordinates | FCC info |
|---|---|---|---|---|---|---|---|---|
| W272DQ | 102.3 FM | Elmhurst, Illinois | 151530 | 250 | 51 m (167 ft) | D | 41°50′33″N 88°0′9″W | LMS |

== See also ==
Joseph J. Gentile Center
