= WSRQ (AM) =

- Sarasota, Florida; United States
- Broadcast area: Sarasota; Bradenton; Venice
- Frequency: 1220 kHz
- Branding: The New SRQ

Programming
- Format: Classic hits
- Affiliations: WWSB-TV; Tampa Bay Rays Radio Network; Tampa Bay Lightning Radio Network

Ownership
- Owner: Lake Erie College of Osteopathic Medicine, Inc.
- Sister stations: WSRQ-FM; WVIJ

History
- First air date: January 1, 1961
- Former call signs: WSAF (1961–1973); WQSA (1973–2002); WIBQ (2002–2007)
- Call sign meaning: SRQ = IATA code for Sarasota-Bradenton International Airport

Technical information
- Licensing authority: FCC
- Facility ID: 27663
- Class: D
- Power: 770 watts day; 15 watts night
- Transmitter coordinates: 27°19′27.2″N 82°29′45.3″W
- Translator: See § Translators
- Repeaters: 91.7 WVIJ (Port Charlotte); 106.9 WSRQ-FM (Zolfo Springs)

Links
- Public license information: Public file; LMS
- Webcast: Listen live
- Website: wsrq.lecomradio.com

WSRQ (1220 kHz) is an AM radio station licensed to Sarasota, Florida. It airs a classic hits radio format featuring 1960s, 1970s and 1980s songs. It also carries live sports including Tampa Bay Rays baseball and Tampa Bay Lightning hockey. It is owned by Lake Erie College of Osteopathic Medicine, Inc.

By day, WSRQ is powered at 770 watts non-directional. As 1220 AM is a clear-channel frequency reserved for Class A station XEB in Mexico City, WSRQ reduces power to 15 watts at night to avoid interference. WSRQ is also heard in Northern and Central Sarasota County and throughout Manatee County on a pair of 250-watt FM translators: W295BH broadcasts at 106.9 FM in Sarasota and W237FJ broadcasts at 95.3 FM in Bradenton. Programming is also simulcast on two FM repeater stations: 91.7 WVIJ in Port Charlotte and 106.9 WSRQ-FM in Zolfo Springs.

== History ==
The station signed on the air on January 1, 1961. Its original call sign was WSAF and it was owned by Pan Florida, Inc. WSAF was a daytimer station, powered at 1,000 watts but required to go off the air at night. It eventually was allowed to broadcast after sunset but using low power.

It was announced on July 14, 2011, that WSRQ would be acquired by Florida Talk Radio, LLC. Prior to June 29, 2018, the station was branded as "The Voice of Sarasota-Manatee" and featured a talk radio format.

WSRQ was granted an FCC construction permit to move to a different transmitter site, decreasing daytime power to 770 watts and nighttime power to 15 watts.

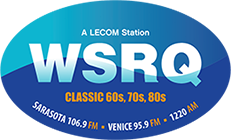
Logo c. 2019

The station, along with its translators, was sold by Florida Talk Radio to Lake Erie College of Osteopathic Medicine, Inc. effective December 10, 2018. The price tag was $520,000.

== Translators ==
Broadcast translators for WSRQ
Call sign	Frequency	City of license	FID	ERP (W)	Class	Transmitter coordinates	FCC info
W237FJ	95.3 FM	Bradenton, Florida	201660	250	D	27°28′32″N 82°32′10″W	LMS
W295BH	106.9 FM	Sarasota, Florida	140532	250	D	27°20′23″N 82°27′55″W	LMS
