= WVIJ =

Simulcasts WSRQ, Sarasota
- Port Charlotte, Florida; United States
- Frequency: 91.7 MHz

Programming
- Format: Oldies

Ownership
- Owner: Lake Erie College of Osteopathic Medicine, Inc.
- Sister stations: WSRQ; WSRQ-FM

History
- First air date: July 26, 1987

Technical information
- Licensing authority: FCC
- Facility ID: 53029
- Class: C3
- ERP: 9,000 watts
- HAAT: 63 meters (207 ft)
- Transmitter coordinates: 26°58′49.8″N 82°4′2.5″W

Links
- Public license information: Public file; LMS
- Webcast: Listen live
- Website: wsrq.lecomradio.com

WVIJ (91.7 FM) is a non-commercial radio station licensed to Port Charlotte, Florida. It simulcasts an oldies format with WSRQ in Sarasota and WSRQ-FM in Zolfo Springs. WVIJ is owned by the Lake Erie College of Osteopathic Medicine, Inc.

WVIJ is a Class C3 FM station. It has an effective radiated power of 9,000 watts. The transmitter is off Sherwood Road at Gray Avenue in Port Charlotte.

== History ==
The station signed on the air on July 26, 1987. It was originally owned by the Port Charlotte Educational Broadcasting Foundation. It had been powered at 380 watts, a fraction of its current output.
