= National Register of Historic Places listings in DeSoto County, Florida =

Location of DeSoto County in Florida

This is a detailed table of the district on the National Register of Historic Places in DeSoto County, Florida, United States. The location of the National Register district for which the latitude and longitude coordinates are included below, may be seen in a map.

There are 5 listings on the National Register in the county.

This National Park Service list is complete through NPS recent listings posted March 21, 2025.

Contents: Counties in Florida (non-linked contain no National Register listings)
Alachua - Baker - Bay - Bradford - Brevard - Broward - Calhoun - Charlotte - Citrus - Clay - Collier - Columbia - DeSoto - Dixie - Duval - Escambia - Flagler - Franklin - Gadsden - Gilchrist - Glades - Gulf - Hamilton - Hardee - Hendry - Hernando - Highlands - Hillsborough (Tampa) - Holmes - Indian River - Jackson - Jefferson - Lafayette - Lake - Lee - Leon - Levy - Liberty - Madison - Manatee - Marion - Martin - Miami-Dade (Miami) - Monroe - Nassau - Okaloosa - Okeechobee - Orange - Osceola - Palm Beach - Pasco - Pinellas - Polk - Putnam - St. Johns - St. Lucie - Santa Rosa - Sarasota - Seminole - Sumter - Suwannee - Taylor - Union - Volusia - Wakulla - Walton - Washington

== Current listing ==
	Name on the Register	Image	Date listed	Location	City or town	Description
1	Arcadia Historic District	Arcadia Historic District	May 10, 1984 (#84000842)	Roughly bounded by Lee and Miles Avenues and Imogene, Cypress, Pine, and Magnolia Streets; 27°12′57″N 81°51′37″W	Arcadia	
2	Johnson-Smith House	Johnson-Smith House	April 16, 2013 (#13000163)	1519 N. Arcadia Ave. 27°14′10″N 81°51′29″W	Arcadia	
3	Pine Level Archeological District	Pine Level Archeological District	September 17, 2014 (#14000618)	Address Restricted; 27°16′00″N 82°00′00″W	Arcadia	
4	William Oswell Ralls House	William Oswell Ralls House	February 14, 2011 (#11000001)	640 West Whidden Street; 27°13′13″N 81°52′01″W	Arcadia	
5	Micajah T. Singleton House	Micajah T. Singleton House	August 6, 2013 (#13000578)	711 West Hickory Street; 27°13′11″N 81°52′08″W	Arcadia	

== See also ==
- List of National Historic Landmarks in Florida
- National Register of Historic Places listings in Florida
