= Lake Erie College of Osteopathic Medicine =

Private medical school in Erie, Pennsylvania, US

Coordinates: 27.45187°N 82.43335°W

- Motto: Totam personam curamus
- Motto in English: "We care for the whole person"
- Type: Private medical school
- Established: 1992
- President: John M. Ferretti, D.O.
- Students: 4,444
- Location: Erie, Pennsylvania, United States
- Campus: Suburban
- Website: lecom.edu

The Lake Erie College of Osteopathic Medicine (LECOM) is a private medical school and academic health center in Erie, Pennsylvania. LECOM has a large branch campus in Bradenton, Florida, and additional locations in Greensburg, Pennsylvania, and Elmira, New York. Founded in 1992, LECOM confers medical (DO), dental (DMD), podiatry (DPM), pharmacy (PharmD) degrees, as well as master's and doctoral degrees in the health sciences.

With over 2,200 enrolled medical students, the College of Osteopathic Medicine at LECOM is the largest and most applied-to medical school in the United States. In addition to traditional acceptance, the medical school offers early acceptance to qualified high school seniors and college underclassmen contingent upon pursuing BS/DO or BA/DO with affiliate universities.

LECOM also operates one of the few accelerated three-year pharmacy programs in the country, and is one of two pharmacy schools in the country with a distance education program.

LECOM is accredited by the Middle States Commission on Higher Education, the American Osteopathic Association's Commission on Osteopathic College Accreditation, the Commission on Dental Accreditation, Council on Podiatric Medical Education, and the Accreditation Council for Pharmacy Education.

== History ==
In the late 1980s, the growing need for new physicians, especially in the Erie area, was becoming increasingly evident and as a result the leaders of Millcreek Community Hospital in Millcreek Township, Pennsylvania founded the health system's now namesake, the Lake Erie College of Osteopathic Medicine, in December 1992. The institution's first courses began in 1993, and the inaugural class of students graduated on May 24, 1997. In 2002, the LECOM School of Pharmacy opened.

In 2004, LECOM opened a branch campus in Bradenton, Florida. In 2007, after other three-year programs in the nation had closed, LECOM was the first US medical school to re-introduce a three-year medical school program. In 2008, LECOM received approval to open an additional branch campus in Greensburg, Pennsylvania at the site of Seton Hill University, which opened in 2009. The branch campus included two additional buildings, with an overall projected cost of $4 million.

In 2012, the Bradenton campus opened a new dental school. In 2020, LECOM opened a new medical school campus in Elmira, New York. In 2022, they announced the opening of their fifth campus to be located at Jacksonville University in Florida. It is expected to start operations in 2026.

The medical school at LECOM is the largest in the United States.

LECOM announced it will open a new school of podiatric medicine in the fall of 2023 after it received approval from the Council on Podiatric Medical Education. It will become the eleventh podiatric medical school in the United States.

As of 2026, the college claims a total enrollment of over 4,400 students and 19,000 alumni. LECOM is a member of the LECOM Health system.

== Academics ==
=== Doctor of Osteopathic Medicine ===
The medical school offers three primary learning pathways: a traditional lecture discussion Program (LDP), a problem-based learning (PBL) program, and a directed study program (DSP), as well as two, three-year programs, all leading to the Doctor of Osteopathic Medicine medical degree. The Erie campus offers LDP and DSP pathways, while the Bradenton, Greensburg, and Elmira campuses offer a curriculum based solely on PBL. Students of the medical degree program apply to and train in residency and fellowship programs of their choice accredited by the Accreditation Council for Graduate Medical Education (ACGME) to acquire medical licensure.

LECOM Health, the academic health system of the medical school, via its teaching hospital in Milcreek offers ACGME-accredited residencies in family medicine, orthopedic surgery, psychiatry, and transitional year, open to medical graduates from all medical schools in the United States and ECFMG-certified international medical graduates. Furthermore, LECOM Health offers ACGME-accredited fellowships on child and adolescent psychiatry and sports medicine for eligible physicians.

=== Doctor of Pharmacy ===
The School of Pharmacy offers three pathways for the Doctor of Pharmacy program. One is a year-round, three-year curriculum based on the Erie campus, while another is a four-year traditional curriculum offered at the Bradenton campus. In 2014, the School of Pharmacy added a four-year distance education pathway for students across the United States. LECOM and Creighton University offer the only two distance education pathways for the primary Pharma degree in the nation.

=== Doctor of Dental Medicine ===
Established in 2012, it is one of three dental schools located in Florida. Its first class graduated in 2016. The school is accredited by the Commission on Dental Accreditation of the American Dental Association.

The School of Dental Medicine (SDM) prepares students for the practice of general dentistry. First-year dental students participate in problem-based learning as they prepare for clinical training. The SDM operates full-service dental practice offices in Bradenton, where third-year students treat patients under the supervision of licensed dentists. In May 2015, the School opened outreach training sites in Erie, Pennsylvania and DeFuniak Springs, Florida. Fourth-year dental students complete their clinical training at these offices. The Doctor of Dental Medicine (DMD) degree is awarded upon completion of LECOM's full-time, four-year program.

== Campuses ==
=== Florida ===
==== Bradenton ====
LECOM Bradenton is located in the managed community of Lakewood Ranch near Sarasota and Bradenton, Florida. The original campus building, containing two large lecture halls and 24 smaller classrooms, houses the College of Osteopathic Medicine and the School of Pharmacy. The School of Dental Medicine (SDM) is located just north of the original building. Half of the building houses the classrooms, laboratories and offices for the SDM and the SHSA. The other side of the building has dental offices where third-year dental students begin clinical training treating patients from the surrounding communities.

==== Jacksonville ====
LECOM opened its fifth campus in Jacksonville, Florida, at Jacksonville University in the Fall of 2026, with a class of 75 students.

=== Pennsylvania ===
==== Erie ====
The main campus is located on West Grandview Boulevard in Erie, Pennsylvania, and overlooks Lake Erie. In 2002, the college expanded the main building with a three-story addition which included classroom, laboratory and office space for the School of Pharmacy. In 2011, the college purchased the LORD Corporation Technology Center on adjoining property. The purchase allowed LORD Corporation to keep its Erie operations by moving to a new location just south of the city. LECOM uses what is now the west campus for the LECOM Erie Dental Offices, research labs, and additional classroom space.

==== Seton Hill ====
LECOM at Seton Hill is an extension of the LECOM Erie College of Osteopathic Medicine classes. Classrooms, laboratories and offices are housed in two buildings on the Seton Hill University campus in Greensburg, Pennsylvania.

=== New York ===
==== Elmira ====
LECOM has sent third- and fourth-year medical students to Arnot Health in Elmira and other nearby hospitals for clinical education since 2012. In September 2018, LECOM received accreditation for a second extension in Elmira, New York, for the LECOM at Elmira. Construction on a new $20 million, 49,000 square-foot facility began in January 2019. The first 120 students began classes in July 2020.

== Professional sports partnerships ==
LECOM officially partnered with the new former Erie BayHawks of the NBA G (Development) League in 2008. As part of those respective deals, LECOM provided medical coverage to both teams. Additionally, the LECOM's name was featured on the BayHawks' jerseys and court design at Erie Insurance Arena. The BayHawks conducted workouts and practices at the LECOM Medical Fitness and Wellness Center. LECOM maintains a similar partnership with the Erie Commodores soccer team.

In February 2017, LECOM purchased the naming rights to LECOM Park, formerly McKechnie Field, the spring training home of the Pittsburgh Pirates and their Single-A affiliate, the Bradenton Marauders. The deal will span 15 years. The college also has educational partnership agreements with the Cleveland Browns, Buffalo Bills, and Buffalo Sabres. As part of the Buffalo Sabres deal LECOM and Pegula Sports and Entertainment reached a 10-year deal for naming rights to LECOM Harborcenter in September 2019. It also has sponsorship agreements with the New York Jets, Baltimore Orioles Ed Smith Stadium in Sarasota, Fla., and the New York Yankees Steinbrenner Field in Tampa, Fla.

== Radio stations ==
LECOM owns these broadcast radio stations:

- WMCE-FM, 88.5 FM, Erie, Pennsylvania, non-commercial classic hits
- WWCB, 1370 AM, Corry, Pennsylvania, full service/classic hits
- WSRQ, 1220 AM, Sarasota, Florida, oldies, and its simulcasts:
  - WSRQ-FM, 106.9 FM, Zollo Springs, Florida
  - WVIJ, 91.7 FM, Port Charlotte, Florida

== See also ==
- Colleges in Pennsylvania
- Osteopathic medicine in the United States
- List of dental schools in the United States
