= Arcadia Municipal Airport =

Coordinates: 27°11′31.18″N 081°50′14.3″W

- IATA: none; ICAO: none; FAA LID: X06

Summary
- Airport type: Public use
- Owner: City of Arcadia
- Operator: City of Arcadia
- Location: DeSoto County, Florida
- Elevation AMSL: 63 ft (19 m)
- Website: http://arcadiaairport.com
- Interactive map of Arcadia Municipal Airport

Runways
Direction	Length		Surface
Direction	ft	m	Surface
5/23	3,700	1,128	Asphalt
13/31	2,780	847	Turf

Statistics (1999)
- Aircraft operations: 19,373
- Based aircraft: 31
- Source: Federal Aviation Administration

Arcadia Municipal Airport (FAA LID: X06) is a public-use airport located 1 mile (1.6 km) southeast of the central business district of the city of Arcadia in DeSoto County, Florida, United States. The airport is publicly owned.

Arcadia is 51 miles East of Bradenton and 64 miles West of Okeechobee on SR 70 and 28 miles NE of Port Charlotte on US 17.

During WW1 Arcadia was known as “Aviation City” because of all the military aviation training going on at Carlstrom & Dorr Fields.

In 1934 the City of Arcadia bought 225 acres for delinquent taxes. A $10,000 federal grant was acquired to build a hangar and an airfield to be used as a “secondary field” to the Carlstrom Military Airfield located just south of Arcadia during the war. The original field had two turf runways approximately 2,500 feet in length.

A flight school was established on the field about 1946. Then from the mid-1970s through the mid-1980s Pat Hange and Harriet Hamilton operated Lennox Flight School where they trained many aircraft and glider pilots. Both Pat & Harriet are in the Soaring Hall of Fame.

In 2009 the City of Arcadia established an Airport Advisory Committee made up of 7 members. FDOT grant funding has been obtained and many improvement projects are on schedule for 2012 and beyond.

In 2012 some members of the Airport Advisory Committee formed an airport support group called the Friends of Arcadia Airport, Inc. dedicated to help the airport grow and prosper. They began by hosting fly-in pancake breakfasts that attract out of town pilots to fly in and visit the airport and the downtown businesses thus assisting the local economy as well. These breakfasts have proven to be very successful and continue to promote the airport in a positive light.

In 2014 Friends of Arcadia Airport, Inc. began work clearing some unused land on the airport to develop a Fly-In/Camp-Out Center. Recreational under wing camping is growing in popularity and Friends recognized the potential of this type of on airport facility to help make Arcadia Municipal a destination airport for pilots who enjoy airplane camping. They developed a unique facility where pilots can taxi right onto the campsite area and push their plane back under beautiful oaks and pitch their tent. The site features a 20 X 30 pilot shelter with picnic tables, a beautiful fire pit surrounded by brick pavers, running water and portable toilets. The site is already attracting pilots from all over the S.E. United States and has hosted pilot seminars and large fly-in camping events. Friends is working with local businesses and attractions to provide transportation into town for the visiting pilots. The site was fully funded by Friends and donated to the City of Arcadia who owns the airport. Site use must be aviation related and is by reservation only through Friends of Arcadia Airport, Inc.

The Aircraft Owners and Pilots Association (AOPA) recently visited the site to include it in a new informational video they are producing to help community leaders understand the benefits that General Aviation Airports have on the local economy.

== See also ==
- List of airports in Florida
