= Florida State Road 72 =

Highway in Florida, United States

State Road 72
- SR 72 highlighted in red

Route information
- Maintained by FDOT
- Length: 41.582 mi (66.920 km)

Major junctions
- West end: US 41 near Sarasota; I-75 near Sarasota
- East end: SR 70 near Arcadia

Location
- Country: United States
- State: Florida
- Counties: Sarasota, DeSoto

Highway system
- Florida State Highway System; Interstate; US; State; Former; Pre‑1945; Toll; Scenic
← SR 71	→ SR 73

State Road 72 (SR 72) is a state highway in DeSoto and Sarasota County, Florida. It is the most direct route to Siesta Key when traveling west on SR 70 from Arcadia and Fort Pierce.

The western terminus is at an intersection with U.S. Route 41. The road is six lanes wide from US 41 to the Interstate 75 interchange. Immediately east of Interstate 75, the road transforms from 6 lanes wide to 2 lanes wide. It crosses the Myakka River and provides access to Myakka River State Park. A block west of the eastern terminus is CR 661, an alternative of U.S. Route 17 and provides access to State Road 60 (via SR 37). Its eastern terminus is at an intersection of SR 70 near Arcadia.

Prior to 2020, SR 72 continued a mile west of US 41 to Siesta Key. This segment was transferred to county control and is now County Road 72 (CR 72).

== Route description ==
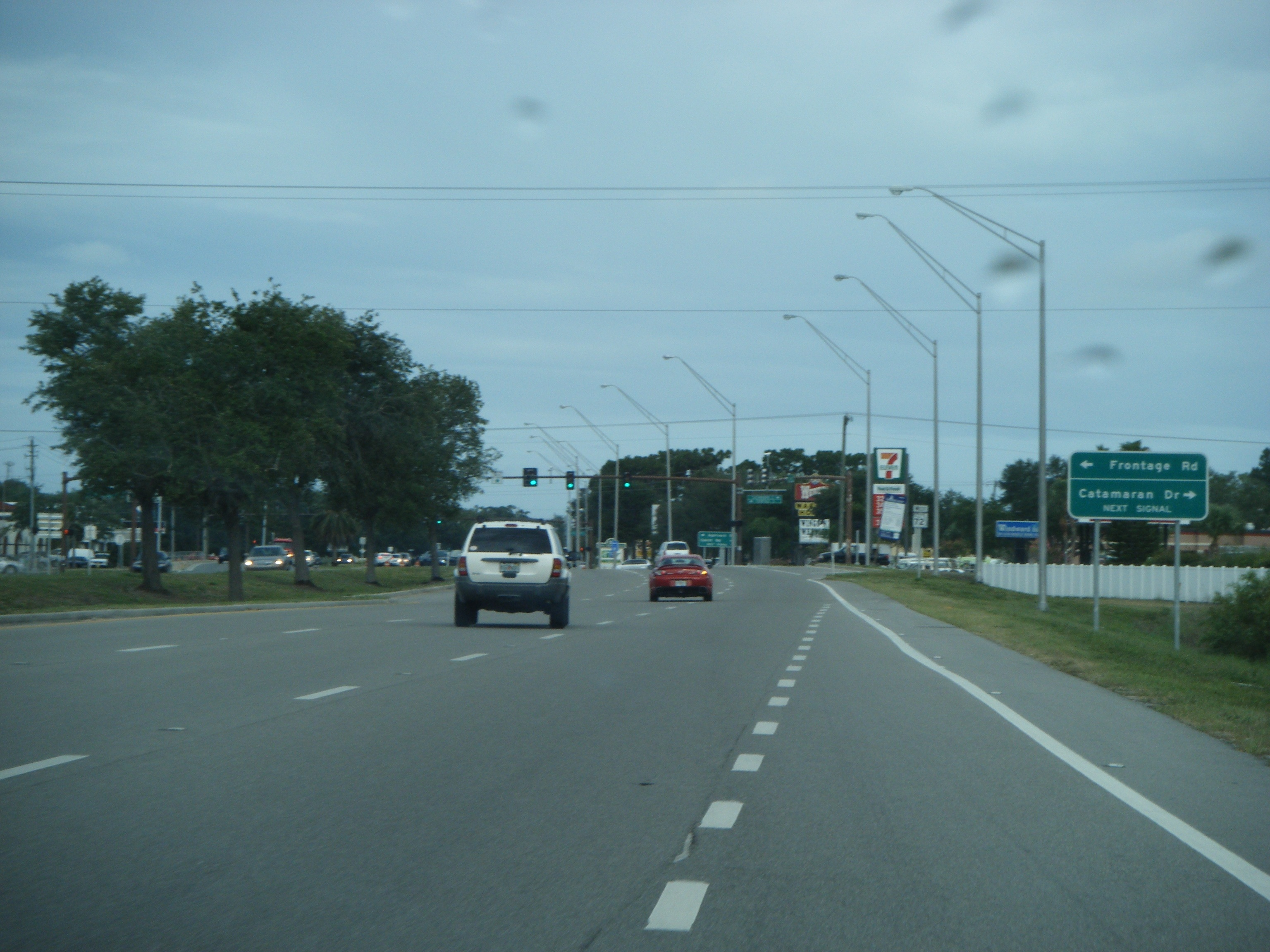
SR 72 westbound past I-75 interchange near Bee Ridge

SR 72 begins at an intersection with US 41/SR 45. SR 72 is known as Stickney Point Road and it passes homes and businesses as a seven-lane road with a center left-turn lane, curving east onto Clark Road at the Swift Road intersection. The road continues through developed areas, crossing South Lockwood Ridge Road, CR 773 (Beneva Road), and Sawyer Road. The state road becomes a six-lane divided highway and intersects McIntosh Road as it crosses the Legacy Trail, where the former Seminole Gulf Railway line existed. SR 72 passes more businesses and intersects Sawyer Loop Road, Honore Avenue, and Gantt Road before coming to an interchange with I-75/SR 93 near Bee Ridge.

Past this interchange, the state road narrows to four lanes before becoming a two-lane undivided road as it heads through residential areas, passing to the north of Twin Lakes Park. The road turns to the southeast and heads into a mix of wooded neighborhoods and fields, becoming an unnamed road. SR 72 curves east again and runs through rural areas of woods and swamps. The road enters Myakka River State Park and turns southeast. The state road continues through wooded swamps within the state park, heading east again. SR 72 leaves Myakka River State Park and passes through areas of fields and trees. The road crosses into DeSoto County and continues through rural areas for several more miles, intersecting CR 769. SR 72 turns northeast and passes through farmland and trees with some homes, intersecting CR 661 before ending at an intersection with SR 70 to the west of Arcadia.

== History ==
Prior to 1945, SR 72 was designated SR 220 from the Sarasota area to Arcadia. After the 1945 Florida state road renumbering, it was designated SR 72. At this point, SR 72 entered the Sarasota area along present-day Proctor Road, then turned north along Sawyer Road, then back west along present-day Bee Ridge Road and terminated at US 41 (Tamiami Trail). At the same time, Stickney Point Road and Clark Road from Siesta Key to a point near the current Interstate 75 interchange were designated as SR 782. From here, SR 782 turned south and east along present-day Hawkins Road to SR 72. By 1957, Clark Road was extended east to SR 72, and SR 72 was rerouted along Clark Road and Stickney Point Road as it is today. The previous route along Proctor Road became SR 72A, and Bee Ridge Road later became SR 758. The SR 782 designation was later reused for Linton Boulevard in Delray Beach.

The four-lane bascule bridge carrying Stickney Point Road to Siesta Key was built in 1968. It replaced a bridge built in 1927.

In 2018, Sarasota County accepted the state's $40 million offer to swap responsibility for several roads (i.e. road swap) in exchange for the state to perform major improvements on River Road, one of the county's main thoroughfares and vital evacuation routes. One of the roads as part of the swap was SR 72 from Midnight Pass Road to US 41. The road transfer was completed in September 2020. The state continues to maintain the Siesta Key bridges.

In May 2024, SR 72's interchange with Interstate 75 was upgraded to a diverging diamond interchange.

Stickney Point is named for Ben Stickney, an early resident of Siesta Key who owned a house just south of the bridge.

== Major intersections ==
County	Location	mi	km	Destinations	Notes
Sarasota		0.000	0.000	US 41 (Tamiami Trail South / SR 45) – Sarasota, Venice	Southern/western terminus
Sarasota		1.803	2.902	Beneva Road (CR 773)	
Sarasota		4.802	7.728	I-75 (SR 93) – Tampa, St. Petersburg, Naples	I-75 exit 205
Sarasota		6.516	10.486	Proctor Road (CR 72A west)	
Sarasota		7.967	12.822	Lorraine Road (formerly Bee Ridge Extension)	
DeSoto		36.701	59.065	CR 769 south – Port Charlotte	
DeSoto		40.731	65.550	CR 661 south	
DeSoto		41.582	66.920	SR 70 – Bradenton, Arcadia	Eastern terminus
1.000 mi = 1.609 km; 1.000 km = 0.621 mi

== County Road 72A ==
County Road 72A
- Location: South Sarasota-Proctor

County Road 72A (CR 72A) is a west-to-east suffixed alternate of SR 72. The road is called Proctor Road and much of it is four lanes wide. It begins as a four-lane undivided highway at US 41 and does not become a divided highway until it reaches the Sarasota County Technical Institute. At McIntosh Road, it narrows to a two-lane undivided highway. At Honore Avenue, it widens to a four-lane divided highway. After the intersection of Cattleman Road and Grove Point Boulevard, the road narrows down to a two-lane undivided highway before crossing over I-75 with no access, then returns to ground level after a power sub-station on the northeast corner of the overpass. After the intersection of a one-lane dead-end street named Falcon Place, it curves to the southeast where it will eventually meet up with its parent route at a signalized intersection with Dove Avenue. A former right of way of the road can be seen on the northeast corner of the terminus.

CR 72A was the original alignment of SR 72 prior to the 1950s.
