= DeSoto County High School =

Location
- 1710 East Gibson Street; Arcadia, Florida; United States
- Coordinates: 27.2219°N 81.8375°W

Information
- Type: Public
- School district: DeSoto County School District
- NCES School ID: 120042000620
- Teaching staff: 68.49 (on FTE basis)
- Grades: 9 to 12
- Enrollment: 1,215 (2024-2025)
- Student to teacher ratio: 17.74
- Colors: Blue and white
- Mascot: Bulldog
- Website: dhs.desotoschools.com

DeSoto County High School is a public high school located in Arcadia, Florida. It is part of the DeSoto County School District.

== Notable alumni ==
- Chris Clemons, former NFL safety
- Mike Papantonio, attorney, radio talk show host.
- Johnny Rembert, former NFL linebacker
- Ed Sharkey, professional football player
- Jim Yarbrough, professional football player
