= WFIC =

- Collinsville, Virginia; United States
- Broadcast area: Martinsville, Virginia; Henry County, Virginia
- Frequency: 1530 kHz

Programming
- Format: Top 49/ Rock

Ownership
- Owner: Grace Baptist Church/ Prior OWNER Sonny Woody; (Grace Missionary Baptist Church d/b/a Grace Christian School)

History
- First air date: March 1, 1970
- Last air date: April 9, 2024 (54 years, 39 days)
- Former call signs: WFIC (1970–2025)
- Call sign meaning: "Faith in Christ" / Prior WFIC stood for First in Collinsville

Technical information
- Facility ID: 59418
- Class: D
- Power: 1,000 watts (day); 250 watts (critical hours)
- Transmitter coordinates: 36°42′56.5″N 79°55′14.1″W

WFIC was a conservative religious formatted broadcast radio station licensed to Collinsville, Virginia, serving Martinsville and Henry County, Virginia. WFIC was owned and operated by Grace Baptist Church.

The Federal Communications Commission cancelled the station's license on September 30, 2025, as it had been silent since April 9, 2024.
