= WSRQ-FM =

Radio station in Zolfo Springs, Florida

Coordinates: 27.367°N 81.798°W

Simulcasts WSRQ, Sarasota
- Zolfo Springs, Florida; United States
- Broadcast area: Hardee County
- Frequency: 106.9 MHz
- Branding: SRQ FM

Programming
- Format: Classic hits

Ownership
- Owner: Lake Erie College of Osteopathic Medicine, Inc.
- Sister stations: WSRQ; WVIJ

History
- First air date: November 1992 (as WZZS)
- Former call signs: WZZS (1992–2019)

Technical information
- Licensing authority: FCC
- Facility ID: 64699
- Class: A
- ERP: 5,000 watts
- HAAT: 109 meters (358 ft)

Links
- Public license information: Public file; LMS
- Webcast: Listen live
- Website: wsrq.lecomradio.com

WSRQ-FM (106.9 MHz) is a radio station licensed to Zolfo Springs, in rural Hardee County, part of Florida's Heartland. It simulcasts a classic hits format with WSRQ (1220 AM) in Sarasota, playing the top songs of the 1960s, 1970s and 1980s. Its studio facilities are near downtown Sarasota.

WSRQ-FM is a Class A FM station, with an effective radiated power (ERP) of 5,000 watts. Its coverage area includes Hardee, DeSoto, and Highlands counties, serving the communities of Wauchula, Zolfo Springs, Arcadia, Sebring, Avon Park, and Lake Placid.

== History ==
The station signed on the air in November 1992. Its original call sign was WZZS.

Starting in July 2005, the station was "106.9 The Bull", featuring a blend of contemporary country hits and all-time favorites. It later became "La Numero 1", airing a Spanish language music format.

Lake Erie College of Osteopathic Medicine, Inc., which has a campus in Bradenton near Sarasota, purchased the station and made it a simulcast of WSRQ, its oldies station in Sarasota.

Canada Calling, hosted by Prior Smith, was aired Monday through Saturday at 10 a.m. from 1996.
