= WENG =

- Englewood, Florida; United States
- Broadcast area: Florida Sun Coast
- Frequency: 1530 kHz
- Branding: News-Talk 1530

Programming
- Format: Talk radio
- Affiliations: Premiere Networks; Westwood One; Compass Media Networks; Fox News Radio

Ownership
- Owner: Joe Fiorini; (Fiorini Broadcasting, LLC)

History
- First air date: November 15, 1964; 61 years ago
- Call sign meaning: Englewood

Technical information
- Licensing authority: FCC
- Facility ID: 47073
- Class: D
- Power: 1,000 watts days 1 watt nights
- Transmitter coordinates: 26°58′15.00″N 82°19′24.00″W
- Translator: See § Translators

Links
- Public license information: Public file; LMS
- Webcast: Listen Live
- Website: wengradio.com

WENG (1530 kHz) is a commercial AM radio station broadcasting a talk radio format. Licensed to Englewood, Florida, the studios are on South River Road. WENG serves the Florida Sun Coast between Sarasota and Fort Myers. It is owned by Joe Fiorini, through Fiorini Broadcasting, LLC.

By day, WENG is powered at 1,000 watts non-directional. As 1530 AM is a clear channel frequency reserved for Class A station WCKY in Cincinnati, at night, to reduce interference, WENG reduces power to one watt. Programming is heard around the clock on two FM translators at 98.1 MHz and 107.5 MHz.

== Programming ==
Weekday mornings on WENG begin with "The Sun Coast This Morning with Kerri Black a local news and information show. The rest of the weekday schedule is nationally syndicated conservative talk shows, including Glenn Beck, Jimmy Failla, Sean Hannity, Mark Levin, Rich Valdés, America in the Morning, This Morning, America's First News with Gordon Deal and Coast to Coast AM with George Noory.

Weekends feature Kim Komando, Leo Laporte, Somewhere in Time with Art Bell and Live from The 60s with The Real Don Steele. Most hours begin with an update from Fox News Radio.

== History ==
The station signed on the air on November 15, 1964. It was owned and operated by the Sarasota-Charlotte Broadcasting Corporation. Edward J. Ewing Jr. was the first general manager. At that time, the station was a daytimer, required to go off the air at night.

On August 27, 1993, the station was acquired by The Murray Broadcasting Company. Murray renovated the studios and offices and installed state-of-the-art equipment and digital sound technology.

WENG was later acquired by Joe Fiorini and operated by Fiorini Broadcasting LLC.

== Translators ==
WENG broadcasts on two FM translators.

Broadcast translators for WENG
Call sign	Frequency	City of license	FID	ERP (W)	HAAT	Class	FCC info
W251CU	98.1 FM	Port Charlotte, Florida	200625	250	97 m (318 ft)	D	LMS
W298AV	107.5 FM	Englewood, Florida	140474	250	54 m (177 ft)	D	LMS
