= Andy Freed =

American sports announcer

Andy Freed (born 1971 in Ellicott City, Maryland) is a sports broadcaster who has been one of the radio voices for the Tampa Bay Rays of Major League Baseball since 2005, when he was hired as half of a new broadcast team with Dave Wills. The two shared play-by-play and color commentating duties during each ballgame, usually alternating roles for two or three innings at a time. Freed and Wills were well-liked in the local market and well-respected across baseball, and in 2020, they were chosen as the best radio team in the American League by The Athletic.

Freed and Wills signed several contract extensions with the Rays, but the partnership ended suddenly when Wills died just before the start of the 2023 season. Since then, Freed has worked Rays radio broadcasts with Neil Solondz, with whom he has continued to swap roles during games. Since 2021, Freed has also served as the Rays' television play-by-play announcer on select road trips when regular TV announcer Dewayne Staats is on vacation.

Freed's radio career has featured work with the Pawtucket Red Sox, the Trenton Thunder, and the St. Lucie Mets in minor league baseball. He also did radio broadcasts for Providence College basketball, Rider University basketball, College of New Jersey football, and Baltimore Spirit soccer. Freed started his broadcast career while still a student at his alma mater, Towson State University, when he covered various sporting events for the university's radio station, WTMD. During baseball's offseason, he has occasionally done play by play duties for college basketball broadcasts for ESPN Regional.

== Personal life ==
Andy Freed grew up outside of Baltimore, Maryland as a Baltimore Orioles fan. In 1992, he met longtime Orioles and ESPN broadcaster Jon Miller, who became a mentor for Freed when he was getting started in the business. Freed and his wife Amy have three children named Sarah, Casey, and Madeline. They also have a dog named Charlie Brown.
