= Dave Wills (sportscaster) =

American sportscaster (1964–2023)

- Born: David Herbert Wills; March 13, 1964; Chicago, Illinois, U.S.
- Died: March 5, 2023 (aged 58); Lutz, Florida, U.S.
- Education: Elmhurst College
- Spouse: Liz
- Children: 2
- Sports commentary career
- Teams: Kane County Cougars; Chicago White Sox; Notre Dame Fighting Irish; UIC Flames; Tampa Bay Rays
- Genre: Play-by-play
- Sports: Baseball; football; basketball

David Herbert Wills (March 13, 1964 – March 5, 2023) was an American sportscaster best known as an announcer for the Tampa Bay Rays radio broadcasts. A native of the Chicago area, he was involved in both sports and journalism in high school and college. After a short stint as a college baseball coach, he began covering sporting events on local radio and television, then did play by play radio for a minor league baseball club.

Wills joined the Chicago White Sox Radio Network as a pre- and post-game host in 1997. In 2005, he and broadcast partner Andy Freed became the radio voices of the Rays, a position he held until his sudden death in March 2023.

== Early life ==
Wills was born in Chicago and raised in nearby Oak Lawn, where he was a "die-hard" fan of the Chicago White Sox of Major League Baseball (MLB). He played baseball and basketball at Oak Lawn Community High School, where he also wrote for the school newspaper. He attended Elmhurst College, where he pitched on the baseball team and worked for the school's newspaper until graduating with degrees in speech communications and urban studies in 1988. While in college, he also worked for SportsPhone, a call-in service that provided one minute of sports scores and updates for the Chicago area. After graduation, Wills served as the pitching coach/recruiting coordinator for the Elmhurst College baseball team in 1989 and as the interim head baseball coach at the University of Chicago in 1990.

== Broadcasting career ==
Wills began his on-air broadcasting career covering sports for radio stations WMAQ and WMVP in Chicago. His first play-by-play position was with the Class-A Kane County Cougars, for whom he was the radio voice from 1991 to 1995. From 1997 to 2004, Wills served as the pre-game and post-game analyst and back-up for John Rooney on White Sox radio broadcasts. During the same period, he also co-hosted a daily sports talk radio show, hosted a local cable television sports show, hosted the pre- and post-game radio broadcasts for Notre Dame football and basketball, and did radio play-by-play for University of Illinois Chicago (UIC) basketball.

Wills and Andy Freed were hired as the new broadcast team by the Tampa Bay Rays before the 2005 season, replacing the club's original radio team of Paul Olden and Charlie Slowes. The pair become popular in the Tampa Bay area and well respected across the league for their knowledge of the game and on-air comradery, and Wills was particularly known for his "big personality" and his ability to connect with fans off the air. Wills and Freed alternated play by play and color commentator duties during Rays game broadcasts, usually trading roles every three innings. They each signed several contract extensions with the Tampa Bay Rays Radio Network, last signing a "multi-year" deal after the 2017 season.

In 2016, Wills was inducted into the Irish-American Baseball Hall of Fame.

On April 14, 2024, Wills was inducted into the Tampa Bay Rays Hall of Fame, the fourth individual to be inducted, after Don Zimmer, Wade Boggs, and Carl Crawford.

== Personal life ==
Wills lived in Lutz, Florida. He and his wife, Liz, had two children.

=== Health and death ===
While covering the Rays on a roadtrip to Toronto in September 2022, Wills was hospitalized with a heart condition which was diagnosed as supraventricular tachycardia. He missed the last two weeks of the Rays' regular season and returned to the radio booth for the 2022 American League Wild Card Series.

Wills returned to regular duties for spring training in 2023. Hours after broadcasting a Rays spring training victory against the New York Yankees, he died in his sleep at his home early on the morning of March 5, 2023, eight days before his 59th birthday.
