= Florida Suncoast =

Region of the state Florida, United States

The Florida Suncoast (or Florida Sun Coast) is a marketing name for the west-central peninsular Florida coastal area, also sometimes known as Florida's Beach communities. The region contains nearly 150 miles (240 km) of Gulf of Mexico beaches and the warm, sunny winter climate attracts tourists from across the US, Canada, and Europe. The name comes from the coast receiving the most days of sunshine per year.

== Cities and counties ==
Visit Florida, the state's official tourism marketing corporation, defines the Suncoast region as the 20 barrier islands in the Clearwater/St. Petersburg area of central west Florida.

The Suncoast region includes the western central Florida cities of St. Petersburg, Clearwater, Largo, Dunedin, Tarpon Springs, Tampa, Brandon, Ruskin, Sarasota and Bradenton, among others. Many of the beach communities on the Gulf of Mexico are individually incorporated cities, such as St. Pete Beach, Treasure Island, Madeira Beach, and Indian Rocks Beach.

== See also ==
- Tampa Bay area
- Central Florida
- Southwest Florida
- Nature Coast – to the north
- Florida Heartland – to the east
- Everglades – to the southeast
