= Arcadia Historic District =

Historic district in Florida, United States

- U.S. National Register of Historic Places
- U.S. Historic district
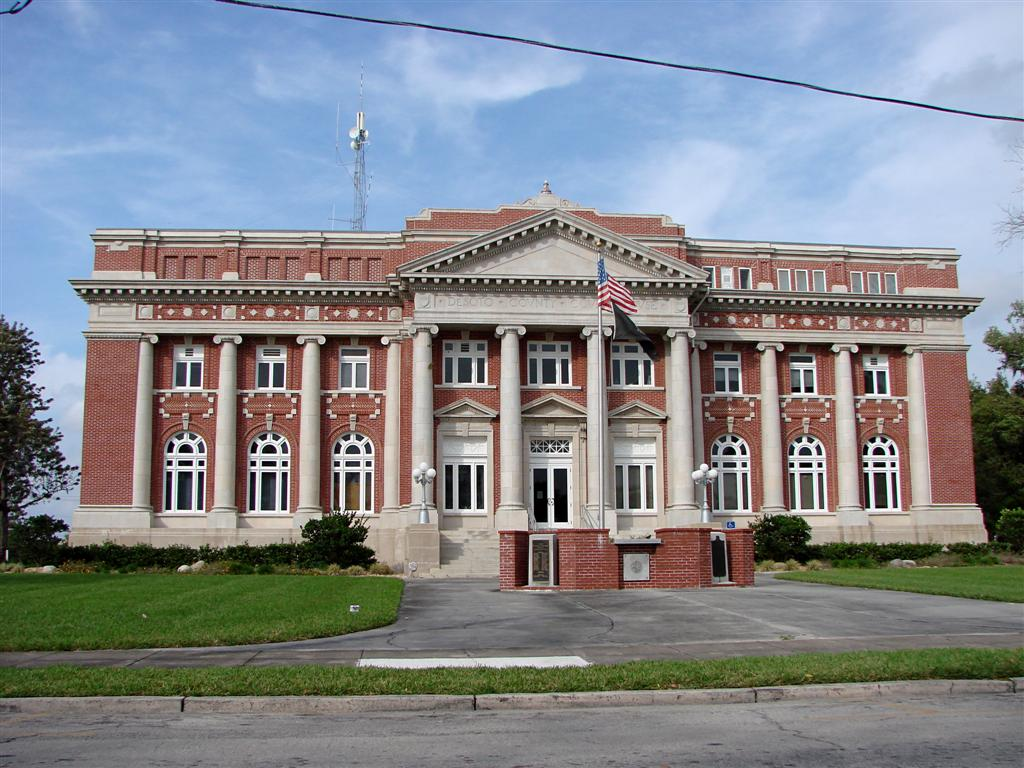
- DeSoto County Courthouse, in the district

- Location within Florida Location within the United States
- Location: Arcadia, Florida
- Coordinates: 27°12′57″N 81°51′37″W
- Area: 3,400 acres (1,400 ha)
- Architectural style: Late Victorian, Classical Revival, Other
- NRHP reference No.: 84000842
- Added to NRHP: May 10, 1984

The Arcadia Historic District is a U.S. historic district in Arcadia, Florida. It is bounded by Lee and Mills Avenues, Imogene, Cypress, Pine, and Magnolia Streets, encompasses approximately 3,400 acres (14 km^{2}), and contains 293 historic buildings. On May 10, 1984, it was added to the U.S. National Register of Historic Places.

== See also ==
- National Register of Historic Places listings in DeSoto County, Florida
