= WCTR (AM) =

- Chestertown, Maryland; United States
- Broadcast area: Kent County - Queen Anne's County
- Frequency: 1530 kHz
- Branding: 100.1 & 106.9 WCTR, The Eastern Shore's Greatest Hits

Programming
- Format: Classic hits
- Affiliations: Bloomberg Radio Network

Ownership
- Owner: Hometown Multimedia, LLC

History
- First air date: June 16, 1963; 63 years ago
- Call sign meaning: from "Chestertown"

Technical information
- Licensing authority: FCC
- Facility ID: 34030
- Class: D
- Power: 1,000 watts days only 270 watts critical hours
- Transmitter coordinates: 39°13′35.4″N 76°05′18.8″W
- Translator: see below

Links
- Public license information: Public file; LMS
- Webcast: WCTR Webstream
- Website: WCTR.com

WCTR (1530 kHz) is a commercial AM radio station licensed to Chestertown, Maryland, and serving Kent, Queen Anne's, Talbot and Caroline counties in Maryland. It broadcasts a classic hits radio format and is owned and operated by Hometown Multimedia, LLC. The radio studios and offices are on Flatland Road in Chestertown.

WCTR is a daytimer AM station. It is powered at 1,000 watts (270 watts during critical hours). But 1530 AM is a clear channel frequency reserved for Class A stations KFBK Sacramento and WCKY Cincinnati. So at night, WCTR's AM transmitter must go off the air. Programming is heard around the clock on an FM translator: 106.9 W295CJ and on FM translator: 100.1 "'W261AE'".

== Translators ==
In addition to the main station, WCTR is relayed by 2 FM translators to widen its broadcast area.

Broadcast translators for WCTR
Call sign	Frequency	City of license	FID	ERP (W)	HAAT	Class	FCC info
W295CJ	106.9 FM	Chestertown, Maryland	141573	50	106.9 m (351 ft)	D	LMS
W261AE	100.1 FM	Chesterville, Maryland	20542	250	100.1 m (328 ft)	D	LMS
