= KVDW =

Radio station in England–Little Rock, Arkansas

Coordinates: 34°32′45″N 91°59′04″W

- England, Arkansas; United States
- Broadcast area: Little Rock metropolitan area
- Frequency: 1530 kHz
- Branding: Victory 100.9 FM 1530 am

Programming
- Format: Southern Gospel/Talk

Ownership
- Owner: Alvin Simmons; (Habibi's Broadcasting, Inc.)

History
- First air date: 1976
- Former call signs: KELC

Technical information
- Licensing authority: FCC
- Class: D
- Power: 2,500 Watts (Daytime); 270 Watts (Critical hours)

Links
- Public license information: Public file; LMS
- Webcast: KVDW Live Feed
- Website: www.victoryfmradio.com/index.html

KVDW (branded as Vern 1530AM) is a radio station serving the Little Rock metropolitan area with southern gospel and talk programming.

The station broadcasts on AM frequency 1530 kHz and is currently owned by Alvin Simmons, through licensee Habibi's Broadcasting, Inc.

Because it shares the same frequency as "clear channel" station WCKY-AM in Cincinnati, Ohio; KVDW operates only during daytime hours.

== History ==
KVDW began its broadcasting activities on December 18, 2006, and has since then maintained its current format. It was formerly known as "Victory 1530."

== FM Translator ==
In addition to the main station at 1530 kHz, KVDW is relayed by an FM translator in order to widen its broadcast area and provide 24 hours coverage.

Broadcast translators for KVDW
| Call sign | Frequency | City of license | FID | ERP (W) | HAAT | Class | FCC info |
|---|---|---|---|---|---|---|---|
| K265EO | 100.9 FM | England, Arkansas | 150992 | 250 | 122.7 m (403 ft) | D | LMS |
| K237GW | 95.3 FM | North Little Rock, Arkansas | 201398 | 240 | 76.2 m (250 ft) | D | LMS |
