= WTTI =

- Dalton, Georgia; United States
- Frequency: 1530 kHz

Programming
- Format: Christian

Ownership
- Owner: Deborah and James Boyd; (Hope Broadcasting, Inc.)

History
- First air date: June 1965

Technical information
- Licensing authority: FCC
- Facility ID: 53957
- Class: D
- Power: 1,000 watts day 320 watts critical hours
- Transmitter coordinates: 34°47′9.00″N 85°2′40.00″W
- Translators: W227DG (93.3 MHz, Dalton)

Links
- Public license information: Public file; LMS
- Website: wttiradio.com

WTTI (1530 AM) and 93.3 FM is a radio station broadcasting a Contemporary Christian music format. WTTI operates with a power of 10,000 watts, and uses a two-tower directional antenna system. Licensed to Dalton, Georgia, United States, the station is currently owned by Deborah and James Boyd, through licensee Hope Broadcasting, Inc.

== History ==
The station went on the air as WTTI on June 17, 1965, and broadcast a country music format. At that time the station was owned by WTTI broadcasters, and was located in the First National Bank building in Dalton. The station had its first ownership change in September 1971. In 1972, WTTI was broadcasting a contemporary music format. In 1981, the station's format was again Country music. WTTI had its second ownership change in September 1986, and was then airing an adult contemporary music format. The station was sold for a third time in 1987. The new owner was Pye Wilson Broadcasting, who switched WTTI to a Christian music format. The station was sold to Troy Hall who continued the Christian format through Troy Hall Broadcasting. In 2009, Deborah and Jim Boyd (Hope Broadcasting, Inc.) took over ownership with a Praise and Worship (Christian music) format. In July 2016, an FM translator was added to WTTI at 93.3 FM. WTTI Radio currently airs on 1530 AM, 93.3 FM, and wttiradio.com. The station signal covers Northwest Georgia, including Dalton, Chatsworth, Ringgold, LaFayette, and Calhoun. The AM station signs off at sunset, to protect WCKY from Cincinnati, Ohio. The FM station is 24 hours. WTTI Radio streams live at wttiradio.com and on smart phone apps, both IOS and android formats.
