= WCXS =

Radio station in Arcadia, Florida

- Arcadia, Florida; United States
- Frequency: 1480 kHz
- Branding: Classic Country 104.5

Programming
- Format: Classic country
- Affiliations: Fox News Radio

Ownership
- Owner: Florini Broadcasting LLC

History
- First air date: September 3, 1955
- Former call signs: WAPG (1955–1990); WOKD (1990–1992); WKGF (1992–1999); WZTK (1999–2004); WFLN (2004–2020)
- Call sign meaning: Sounds like "classics"

Technical information
- Licensing authority: FCC
- Facility ID: 72688
- Class: D
- Power: 1,000 watts (day); 131 watts (night)
- Transmitter coordinates: 27°13′43″N 81°51′28″W
- Translator: 104.5 W283DB (Arcadia)

Links
- Public license information: Public file; LMS
- Webcast: Listen live
- Website: classiccountry1045.com

WCXS (1480 AM) is a commercial radio station licensed to Arcadia, Florida, United States, broadcasting a classic country format branded as "Classic Country 104.5". Owned by Florini Broadcasting LLC, the station is relayed full-time over FM translator W283DB (104.5 FM).

== History ==
The station signed on the air on September 3, 1955, as WAPG. It was originally a daytimer station, required to go off the air at sunset to avoid interfering with other stations.

In the early 2000s, it ran a talk radio format. It had a schedule of nationally syndicated talk programs including Dave Ramsey, Doug Stephan, Todd Starnes, Sean Hannity, and Tom Sullivan. Hourly news updates came from CBS News Radio.

The station changed its call sign from WFLN to WCXS on March 3, 2020. In late May 2020, WCXS changed its format from talk to classic country music, branded as "Classic Country 104.5".
