= Southeast Arcadia, Florida =

- CDP
- Location in DeSoto County and the state of Florida
- Coordinates: 27°10′46″N 81°51′55″W
- Country: United States
- State: Florida
- County: DeSoto

Area
  - Total: 7.24 sq mi (18.75 km^{2})
  - Land: 7.24 sq mi (18.75 km^{2})
  - Water: 0 sq mi (0.00 km^{2})
- Elevation: 56 ft (17 m)

Population (2020)
  - Total: 6,299
  - Density: 870.1/sq mi (335.96/km^{2})
- Time zone: UTC-5 (Eastern (EST))
  - Summer (DST): UTC-4 (EDT)
- ZIP code: 34266
- Area code: 863
- FIPS code: 12-67355
- GNIS feature ID: 2402884

Southeast Arcadia is a census-designated place (CDP) in DeSoto County, Florida, United States. The population was 6,299 at the 2020 census, down from 6,554 at the 2010 census. It is part of the Arcadia, FL Micropolitan Statistical Area.

== Geography ==
According to the United States Census Bureau, the CDP has a total area of 7.3 square miles (18.9 km^{2}), all land.

== Demographics ==
Historical population
Census	Pop.	Note	%±
1990	4,145		—
2000	6,064		46.3%
2010	6,554		8.1%
2020	6,299		−3.9%
U.S. Decennial Census

=== 2020 census ===
As of the 2020 census, Southeast Arcadia had a population of 6,299. The median age was 32.7 years. 29.5% of residents were under the age of 18 and 11.1% of residents were 65 years of age or older. For every 100 females there were 106.3 males, and for every 100 females age 18 and over there were 106.9 males age 18 and over.

93.6% of residents lived in urban areas, while 6.4% lived in rural areas.

There were 2,052 households in Southeast Arcadia, of which 43.5% had children under the age of 18 living in them. Of all households, 43.0% were married-couple households, 21.2% were households with a male householder and no spouse or partner present, and 26.0% were households with a female householder and no spouse or partner present. About 20.8% of all households were made up of individuals and 10.2% had someone living alone who was 65 years of age or older.

There were 2,434 housing units, of which 15.7% were vacant. The homeowner vacancy rate was 0.9% and the rental vacancy rate was 8.2%.

Racial composition as of the 2020 census
Race	Number	Percent
White	2,884	45.8%
Black or African American	356	5.7%
American Indian and Alaska Native	66	1.0%
Asian	44	0.7%
Native Hawaiian and Other Pacific Islander	0	0.0%
Some other race	1,764	28.0%
Two or more races	1,185	18.8%
Hispanic or Latino (of any race)	3,706	58.8%

=== 2010 census ===
In 2010 Southeast Arcadia had a population of 6,554. The racial and ethnic composition of the population was 52.3% Mexican, 4.5% other Hispanic, 37.2% non-Hispanic white, 4.9% black or African American, 0.6% Native American, 0.1% Asian Indian, 0.2% other Asian, 0.2% non-Hispanic reporting some other race and 3.4% from two or more races.

=== 2000 census ===
As of the census of 2000, there were 6,064 people, 1,897 households, and 1,295 families residing in the CDP. The population density was 830.1 inhabitants per square mile (320.5/km^{2}). There were 2,230 housing units at an average density of 305.3 per square mile (117.9/km^{2}). The racial makeup of the CDP was 73.24% White, 4.16% African American, 2.49% Native American, 0.36% Asian, 18.09% from other races, and 1.67% from two or more races. Hispanic or Latino of any race were 45.73% of the population.

There were 1,897 households, out of which 30.4% had children under the age of 18 living with them, 49.1% were married couples living together, 10.8% had a female householder with no husband present, and 31.7% were non-families. 19.5% of all households were made up of individuals, and 10.8% had someone living alone who was 65 years of age or older. The average household size was 3.16 and the average family size was 3.37.

In the CDP, the population was spread out, with 25.3% under the age of 18, 15.4% from 18 to 24, 28.3% from 25 to 44, 17.7% from 45 to 64, and 13.4% who were 65 years of age or older. The median age was 30 years. For every 100 females, there were 139.1 males. For every 100 females age 18 and over, there were 150.5 males.

The median income for a household in the CDP was $28,409, and the median income for a family was $30,053. Males had a median income of $20,593 versus $16,904 for females. The per capita income for the CDP was $13,891. About 20.3% of families and 33.8% of the population were below the poverty line, including 43.7% of those under age 18 and 4.7% of those age 65 or over.
