= DeSoto County, Florida =

County in Florida, United States

- County
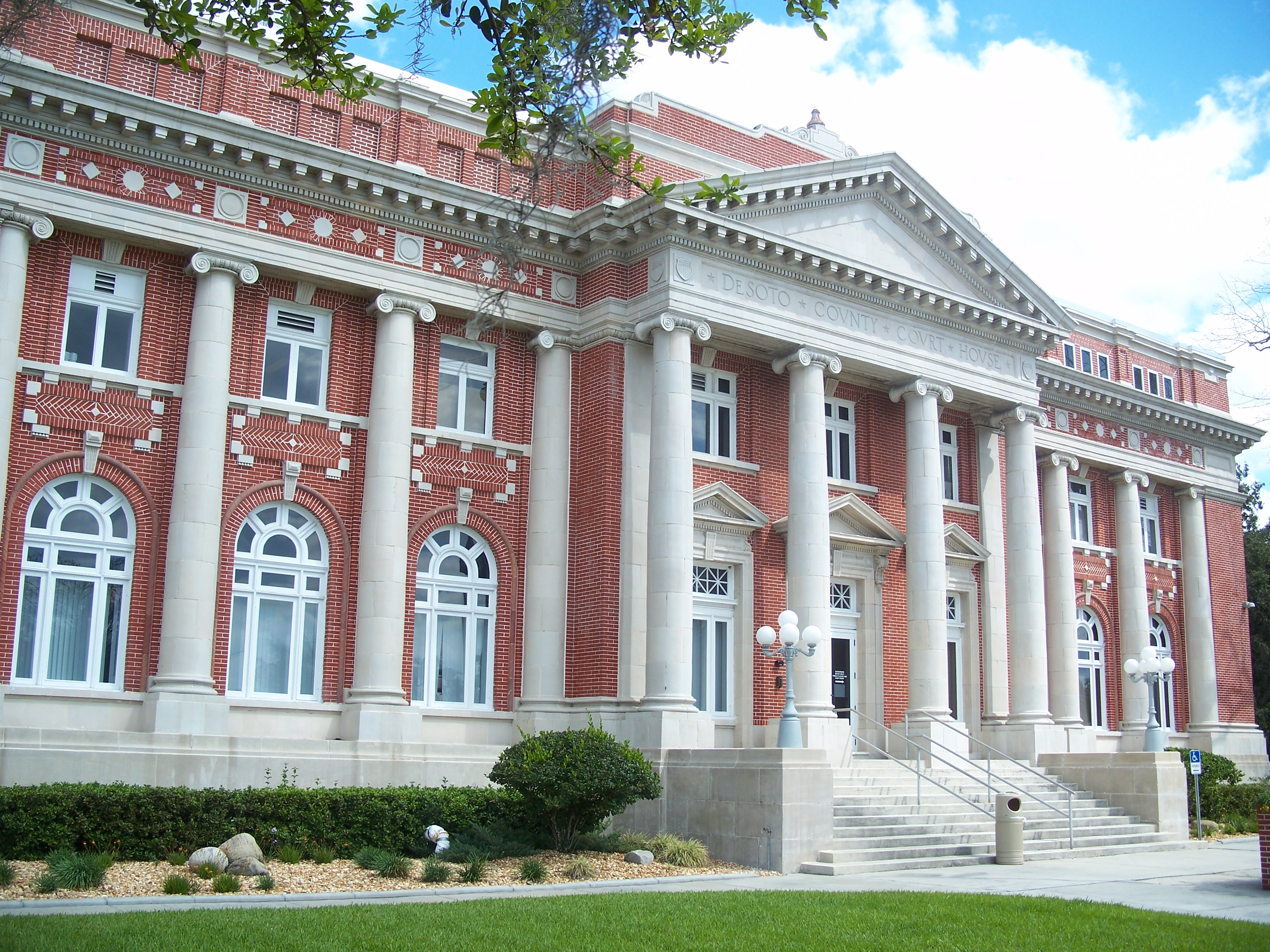
- DeSoto County Courthouse

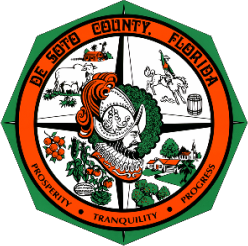
- Seal

- Location within the U.S. state of Florida
- Coordinates: 27°11′N 81°49′W
- Country: United States
- State: Florida
- Founded: May 19, 1887
- Named for: Hernando de Soto
- Seat: Arcadia
- Largest city: Arcadia

Area
  - Total: 639 sq mi (1,660 km^{2})
  - Land: 637 sq mi (1,650 km^{2})
  - Water: 2.4 sq mi (6.2 km^{2}) 0.4%

Population (2020)
  - Total: 33,976
  - Estimate (2025): 37,078 ▲
  - Density: 53.3/sq mi (20.6/km^{2})
- Time zone: UTC−5 (Eastern)
  - Summer (DST): UTC−4 (EDT)
- Congressional district: 18th
- Website: www.desotobocc.com

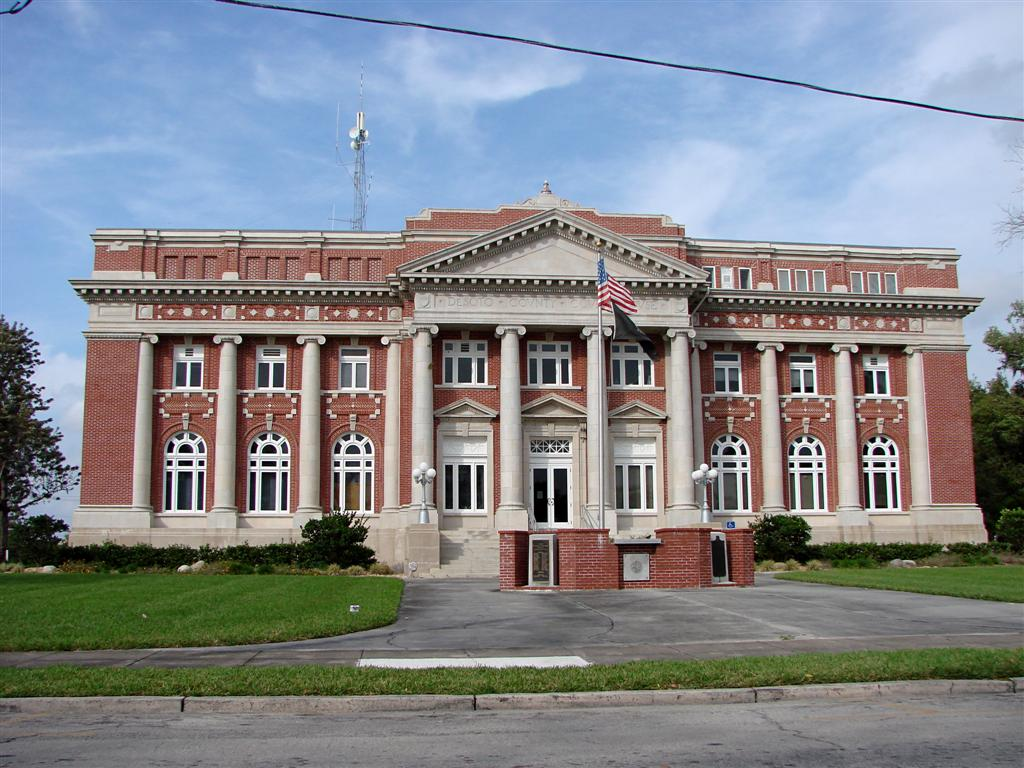
DeSoto County Courthouse

DeSoto County is a county located in the Florida Heartland region of the U.S. state of Florida. As of the 2020 census, the population was 33,976. Its county seat is Arcadia. DeSoto County comprises the Arcadia, Florida Micropolitan Statistical Area, which is included in the North Port-Bradenton, Florida Combined Statistical Area.

== History ==
Prior to the arrival of the Spanish, what is now DeSoto County was within the territory of the Native American Calusa tribe.

In 1513, Ponce De Leon sailed into present-day Charlotte Harbor near the mouth of the Peace River to put in for repairs and maintenance on his ships. While there the Spanish encountered Calusa and soon after an argument broke out and several died on both sides. Then the Spanish kidnapped several Calusa and departed Charlotte Harbor and sailed S.W. away from the west coast of Florida. This occurred within the original boundaries of DeSoto County.

In 1521, Ponce De Leon attempted to establish a colony at or near Charlotte Harbor but again was turned away by the Calusa who wounded him. Shortly after, he died and was buried in Puerto Rico.

In 1528 the Spanish Conquistadors Panfilo De Narvaez and Cabeza De Vaca came to present-day Arcadia where they captured several Calusa Indians who told them of great quantities of gold located to the north and offered to guide them there.

In 1539 the Spanish Explorer Hernando DeSoto, for whom the county is named, anchored in Charlotte Harbor and set about to explore the region with mixed results. Eventually, he made his way up the coast to present-day Manatee County and went inland from there.

While Florida was claimed by Spain the moment it was discovered, the territory of La Florida was not formalized until 1565 with the founding of St. Augustine. At that point, what is now DeSoto County became part of La Florida. In 1763, the region became part of East Florida under British Rule. In 1783, East Florida was returned to Spain at which point today's DeSoto county was once again Spanish territory. In 1821 it became U.S. Territory.

In 1841 Camp Ogden, later Fort Ogden was built as a staging area for the U.S. Army during the 2nd Seminole War, in the southwestern part of present-day DeSoto County.

In 1870, the Joshua Creek Church and neighboring cemetery was founded.

In the 1870s John W. Whidden, a Confederate veteran and former Manatee county clerk, settled along the Joshua Creek where he founded a cattle ranch raising thousands of head of cattle. Also in the 1870s, Union veteran Robert C. Hendry took up cattle ranching on the Joshua Creek in the now-defunct settlement of Davidson.

In 1876 the Fort Ogden Post Office was founded and remains the oldest post office in the county.

DeSoto County was created in 1887 from Manatee County. It was named for Spanish explorer Hernando de Soto, whose name was also honored in Hernando County.

DeSoto County originally included several other present-day counties until 1921, when the Florida legislature created the following new counties: Charlotte, Glades, Hardee, and Highlands.

During World War II, DeSoto County operated the Carlstrom Field Air Base, which provided training for both American and British pilots. Twenty-three British pilots were killed while training at the base and are honored at DeSoto County's Oak Ridge Cemetery, which is located in the town of Arcadia. In 1945, the base turned out its last cadets and was decommissioned. The base was then sold to the State of Florida for one dollar and later converted into a mental health facility known as G. Pierce Wood Memorial Hospital. The hospital has since been converted into a facility for juvenile offenders. The facility was closed and is now up for sale.

On August 13, 2004, Hurricane Charley passed directly through DeSoto County. Hurricane-force winds persisted for an hour, damaging most of the structures in the county and causing some to be completely destroyed.

== Geography ==
According to the U.S. Census Bureau, the county has a total area of 639 square miles (1,660 km^{2}), of which 637 square miles (1,650 km^{2}) is land and 2.4 square miles (6.2 km^{2}) (0.4%) is water. The highest elevation in DeSoto County is 96 feet and is located right on the border between DeSoto County and Highlands County and is about three miles south of the border with Hardee County. The lowest elevation in DeSoto County is sea level and is located in the Peace River near its mouth.

=== Adjacent counties ===
- Hardee County, Florida - north
- Highlands County, Florida - east
- Glades County, Florida - southeast
- Charlotte County, Florida - south
- Sarasota County, Florida - west
- Manatee County, Florida - northwest

=== Lakes ===
The largest body of water in DeSoto County not including the Peace River is a man made reservoir located within the RV Griffin Reserve and is not open to the public. The largest natural lake in DeSoto County is Sour Orange lake and is located at 27°07'23.2"N 81°39'07.0"W Lake Operation is located at 27°06'56.0"N 81°39'43.0"W Split Lake is located at 27°10'33.5"N 81°37'18.7"W Besides the Peace River, and the three above bodies of water, there are few other natural bodies of water of note, mostly small ponds and most are not named. There are about as many man made retention ponds in DeSoto County.

=== Rivers ===
- Peace River

== Demographics ==
Historical population
Census	Pop.	Note	%±
1890	4,944		—
1900	8,047		62.8%
1910	14,200		76.5%
1920	25,434		79.1%
1930	7,745		−69.5%
1940	7,792		0.6%
1950	9,242		18.6%
1960	11,683		26.4%
1970	13,060		11.8%
1980	19,039		45.8%
1990	23,865		25.3%
2000	32,209		35.0%
2010	34,862		8.2%
2020	33,976		−2.5%
2025 (est.)	37,078	▲	9.1%
U.S. Decennial Census; 1790–1960 1900–1990; 1990–2000 2010–2019

DeSoto County, Florida – Racial and ethnic composition Note: the US Census treats Hispanic/Latino as an ethnic category. This table excludes Latinos from the racial categories and assigns them to a separate category. Hispanics/Latinos may be of any race.
Race / Ethnicity (NH = Non-Hispanic)	Pop 1980	Pop 1990	Pop 2000	Pop 2010	Pop 2020	% 1980	% 1990	% 2000	% 2010	% 2020
White alone (NH)	14,797	17,724	19,704	19,549	18,624	77.72%	74.27%	61.18%	56.08%	54.82%
Black or African American alone (NH)	3,527	3,672	4,031	4,338	4,203	18.53%	15.39%	12.52%	12.44%	12.37%
Native American or Alaska Native alone (NH)	33	77	77	62	80	0.17%	0.32%	0.24%	0.18%	0.24%
Asian alone (NH)	55	89	131	169	189	0.29%	0.37%	0.41%	0.48%	0.56%
Native Hawaiian or Pacific Islander alone (NH)	x	x	5	4	8	x	x	0.02%	0.01%	0.02%
Other race alone (NH)	17	21	12	29	80	0.09%	0.09%	0.04%	0.08%	0.24%
Mixed race or Multiracial (NH)	x	x	230	286	781	x	x	0.71%	0.82%	2.30%
Hispanic or Latino (any race)	610	2,282	8,019	10,425	10,011	3.20%	9.56%	24.90%	29.90%	29.46%
Total	19,039	23,865	32,209	34,862	33,976	100.00%	100.00%	100.00%	100.00%	100.00%

A map of racial demographics in DeSoto County by Census tract Legend: Non-Hispanic White 40–50% 50–60% 60–70% 80–90% >90% Hispanic 50–60%

=== 2020 census ===
As of the 2020 census, there were 33,976 people, 11,941 households, and 8,306 families residing in the county.

The median age was 42.7 years; 20.5% of residents were under the age of 18 and 22.7% of residents were 65 years of age or older. For every 100 females there were 117.6 males, and for every 100 females age 18 and over there were 120.3 males.

The racial makeup of the county was 62.8% White, 12.6% Black or African American, 0.5% American Indian and Alaska Native, 0.6% Asian, <0.1% Native Hawaiian and Pacific Islander, 11.9% from some other race, and 11.6% from two or more races. Hispanic or Latino residents of any race comprised 29.5% of the population.

51.0% of residents lived in urban areas, while 49.0% lived in rural areas.

There were 11,941 households in the county, of which 30.1% had children under the age of 18 living in them. Of all households, 47.7% were married-couple households, 18.8% were households with a male householder and no spouse or partner present, and 25.9% were households with a female householder and no spouse or partner present. About 25.4% of all households were made up of individuals and 14.5% had someone living alone who was 65 years of age or older.

There were 15,548 housing units, of which 23.2% were vacant. Among occupied housing units, 73.0% were owner-occupied and 27.0% were renter-occupied. The homeowner vacancy rate was 1.5% and the rental vacancy rate was 12.5%.

=== 2000 census ===
As of the 2000 census, there were 32,209 people, 10,746 households, and 7,672 families residing in the county. The population density was 50 inhabitants per square mile (19/km^{2}). There were 13,608 housing units at an average density of 21 per square mile (8.1/km^{2}). The racial makeup of the county was 73.33% White, 12.72% Black or African American, 1.59% Native American, 0.41% Asian, 0.04% Pacific Islander, 10.49% from other races, and 1.43% from two or more races. 24.90% of the population were Hispanic or Latino of any race. 2005 estimates showed the population as being 56.3% non-Hispanic white, 31.4% Latino, 11.8% African-American and 2.9% Native American.

In 2000 there were 10,746 households, out of which 26.50% had children under the age of 18 living with them, 55.50% were married couples living together, 10.30% had a female householder with no husband present, and 28.60% were non-families. 21.00% of all households were made up of individuals, and 11.40% had someone living alone who was 65 years of age or older. The average household size was 2.70 and the average family size was 3.00.

In the county, the population was spread out, with 22.70% under the age of 18, 11.20% from 18 to 24, 26.70% from 25 to 44, 20.50% from 45 to 64, and 19.00% who were 65 years of age or older. The median age was 36 years. For every 100 females, there were 128.30 males. For every 100 females age 18 and over, there were 134.70 males.

The median income for a household in the county was $30,714, and the median income for a family was $34,726. Males had a median income of $22,572 versus $20,004 for females. The per capita income for the county was $14,000. About 14.20% of families and 23.60% of the population were below the poverty line, including 31.50% of those under age 18 and 7.30% of those age 65 or over.

== Politics ==
DeSoto is a heavily Republican county. It has not been won by a Democratic presidential candidate since 1976. In 2024, Republican Donald Trump carried the county with the highest percentage since Nixon's 1972 landslide, mirroring the Republican trends seen across the rest of the state of Florida since 2020.

=== Voter registration ===
According to the Secretary of State's office, Republicans are a plurality of registered voters in DeSoto County.

DeSoto County Voter Registration & Party Enrollment as of March 31, 2022:
Political Party	Total Voters	Percentage
Republican	7,317	40.72%
Democratic	6,144	34.19%
No Party Affiliation	4,337	24.14%
Minor Parties	170	0.95%
Total	17,968	100%

=== Statewide elections ===
United States presidential election results for DeSoto County, Florida
Year	Republican		Democratic		Third party(ies)	
Year	No.	%	No.	%	No.	%
1904	188	18.50%	721	70.96%	107	10.53%
1908	244	16.98%	992	69.03%	201	13.99%
1912	110	8.74%	847	67.28%	302	23.99%
1916	385	14.95%	1,755	68.13%	436	16.93%
1920	1,077	28.02%	2,496	64.93%	271	7.05%
1924	230	25.14%	641	70.05%	44	4.81%
1928	1,382	64.04%	748	34.66%	28	1.30%
1932	506	23.76%	1,624	76.24%	0	0.00%
1936	560	26.00%	1,594	74.00%	0	0.00%
1940	526	21.79%	1,888	78.21%	0	0.00%
1944	543	23.97%	1,722	76.03%	0	0.00%
1948	569	27.33%	1,157	55.57%	356	17.10%
1952	1,256	41.21%	1,792	58.79%	0	0.00%
1956	1,234	48.41%	1,315	51.59%	0	0.00%
1960	1,687	50.10%	1,680	49.90%	0	0.00%
1964	1,986	52.78%	1,777	47.22%	0	0.00%
1968	1,103	26.94%	937	22.89%	2,054	50.17%
1972	2,958	77.58%	852	22.34%	3	0.08%
1976	2,000	41.48%	2,715	56.30%	107	2.22%
1980	3,356	53.40%	2,713	43.17%	216	3.44%
1984	4,822	67.64%	2,304	32.32%	3	0.04%
1988	4,243	65.64%	2,181	33.74%	40	0.62%
1992	3,070	41.32%	2,646	35.62%	1,713	23.06%
1996	3,275	43.71%	3,222	43.01%	995	13.28%
2000	4,256	54.48%	3,321	42.51%	235	3.01%
2004	5,524	58.09%	3,913	41.15%	73	0.77%
2008	5,632	55.41%	4,383	43.12%	149	1.47%
2012	5,587	56.51%	4,174	42.22%	126	1.27%
2016	6,778	62.17%	3,781	34.68%	344	3.16%
2020	8,313	65.58%	4,259	33.60%	104	0.82%
2024	8,888	70.96%	3,525	28.14%	112	0.89%

United States Senate election results for DeSoto County, Florida1
Year	Republican		Democratic		Third party(ies)	
Year	No.	%	No.	%	No.	%
2024	8,708	70.73%	3,378	27.44%	225	1.83%

United States Senate election results for DeSoto County, Florida3
Year	Republican		Democratic		Third party(ies)	
Year	No.	%	No.	%	No.	%
2022	6,469	74.71%	2,097	24.22%	93	1.07%

Florida Gubernatorial election results for DeSoto County
Year	Republican		Democratic		Third party(ies)	
Year	No.	%	No.	%	No.	%
1994	3,407	54.40%	2,856	45.60%	0	0.00%
1998	3,711	61.67%	2,296	38.15%	11	0.18%
2002	3,951	54.47%	3,212	44.28%	91	1.25%
2006	3,785	57.41%	2,603	39.48%	205	3.11%
2010	3,667	53.10%	2,887	41.80%	352	5.10%
2014	3,681	49.00%	3,294	43.85%	537	7.15%
2018	5,663	61.98%	3,294	36.05%	180	1.97%
2022	6,637	76.28%	2,023	23.25%	41	0.47%

== Library ==
DeSoto County is part of the Heartland Library Cooperative which serves DeSoto County and some of the surrounding counties, including Glades, Highlands, Hardee, and Okeechobee. The seven-branch library system has one branch in Arcadia.

== Local media ==
=== Newspaper ===
The Charlotte Sun produces a section dedicated to Desoto County called The Arcadian. Locally, the section is offered as a standalone for residential delivery.

=== Television ===
Desoto County is part of the Fort Myers/Naples DMA. Almost all stations from Fort Myers and Naples are receivable within the county, as well as some stations from the Tampa/St. Petersburg/Sarasota DMA. There was formerly a low-power television station, WALM-LD on channel 34; however, the station's license was cancelled by the FCC on September 21, 2020.

=== Radio ===
DeSoto County has two radio stations licensed to locations within the county:

- WCXS (1480 AM Classic Country)
- WZSP (105.3 FM La Zeta - Mexican)

== Communities ==
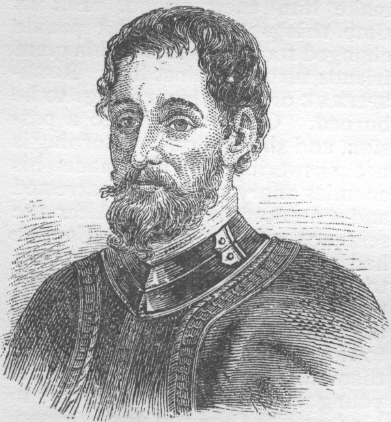
Spanish explorer Hernando de Soto

=== City ===
- Arcadia

=== Census-designated place ===
- Southeast Arcadia

=== Unincorporated communities ===
- Brownville
- Fort Ogden
- Hidden Acres
- Hull
- Lake Suzy
- Nocatee

=== Ghost town ===
- Liverpool
- Pine Level

== Transportation ==
=== Airports ===
Arcadia Municipal Airport is the only public-use airport in DeSoto County.

=== Major highways ===
- Interstate 75 runs only a short section in the very southwestern tip of the county and has no major junctions within the county.
- U.S. Route 17
- State Road 31
- State Road 70
- State Road 72

== See also ==
- DeSoto County High School
- Florida Heartland
- National Register of Historic Places listings in DeSoto County, Florida
