= Nocatee, DeSoto County, Florida =

Unincorporated community in Florida, U.S.

Nocatee is an unincorporated community in DeSoto County, Florida, United States at 27°09′37″N 81°52′56″W. It is located just south southwest of the city of Arcadia.

== History ==
The name Nocatee may come from the Seminole word "nakiti", meaning "what is it?" The population of Nocatee was 1,512 in 1940.
