= Arcadia, Florida =

- City
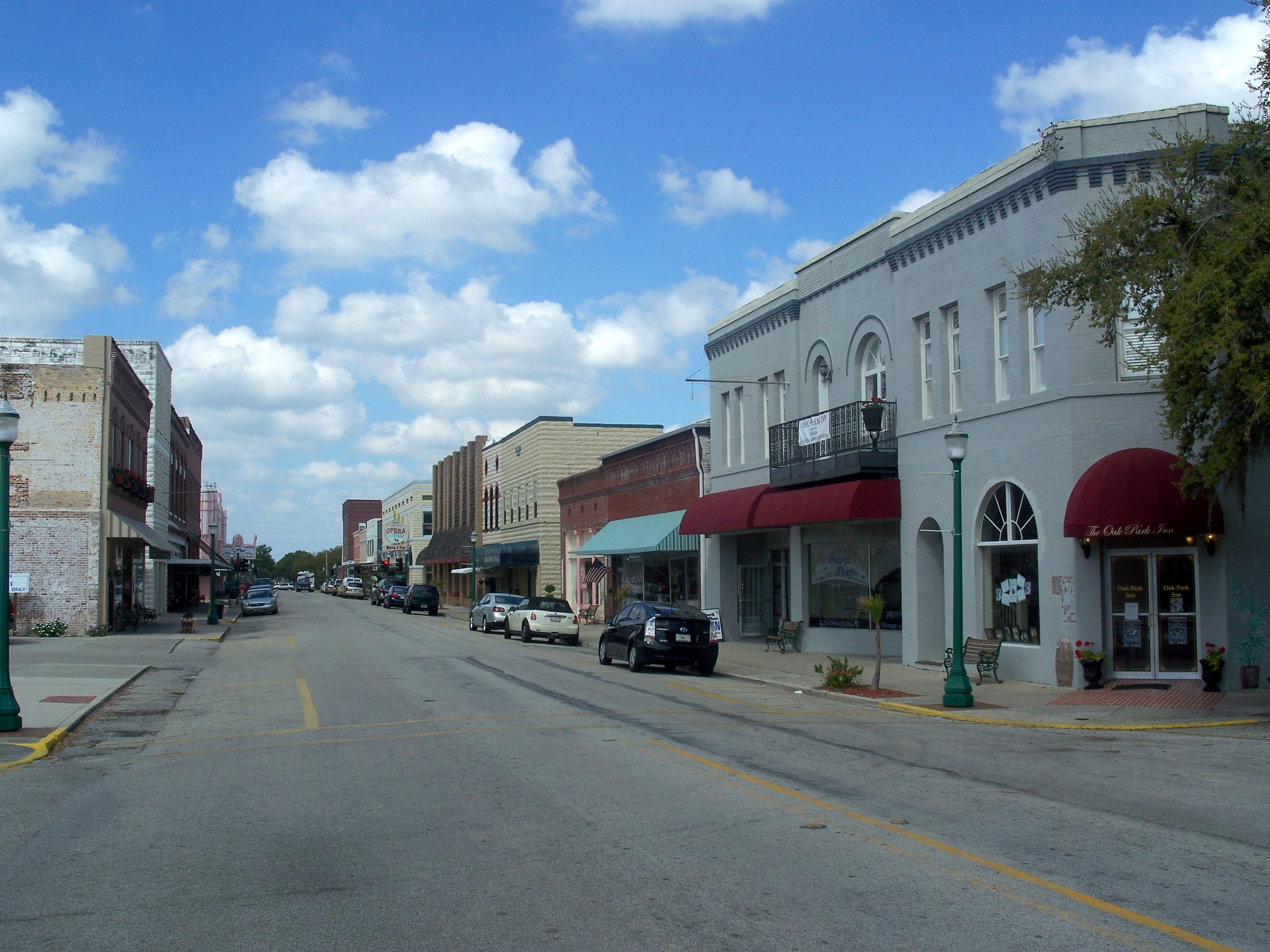
- Arcadia Historic District

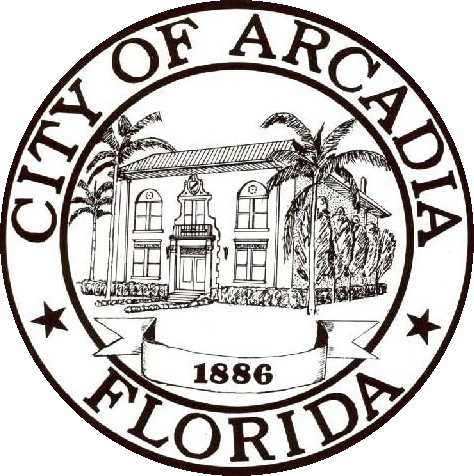
- Flag Seal

- Location of Arcadia in DeSoto County, Florida....
- Coordinates: 27°13′15″N 81°52′05″W
- Country: United States
- State: Florida
- County: DeSoto
- Incorporated: 1886
- Named for: Arcadia Albritton

Government
  - Type: Mayor-Council

Area
  - Total: 4.43 sq mi (11.48 km^{2})
  - Land: 4.43 sq mi (11.47 km^{2})
  - Water: 0.0077 sq mi (0.02 km^{2})
- Elevation: 56 ft (17 m)

Population (2020)
  - Total: 7,420
  - Density: 1,675.7/sq mi (647.01/km^{2})
- Time zone: UTC-5 (EST)
  - Summer (DST): UTC-4 (EDT)
- ZIP codes: 34265, 34266, 34269
- Area code: 863
- FIPS code: 12-01750
- GNIS feature ID: 2403107
- Website: www.arcadia-fl.gov

Arcadia is a city and county seat of DeSoto County, Florida, United States. Arcadia's Historic District is listed on the National Register of Historic Places. Its population was 7,420 as of the 2020 census, down from 7,637 at the 2010 census. It is the principal city of the Arcadia, Florida Micropolitan Statistical Area. The area has a history of ranching and citrus growing. Citrus greening hurt the area's citrus industry. The population is a mix of white, hispanic, and black.

== History ==
According to The Atlas of Florida, "The Rev. James Madison ("Boss") Hendry (1839–1922) named the town in honor of Arcadia Albritton (1861–1932), a daughter of Thomas H. and Fannie (Waldron) Albritton, pioneer settlers. Arcadia had baked him a cake for his birthday, and he appreciated it so much that he named the city after her."

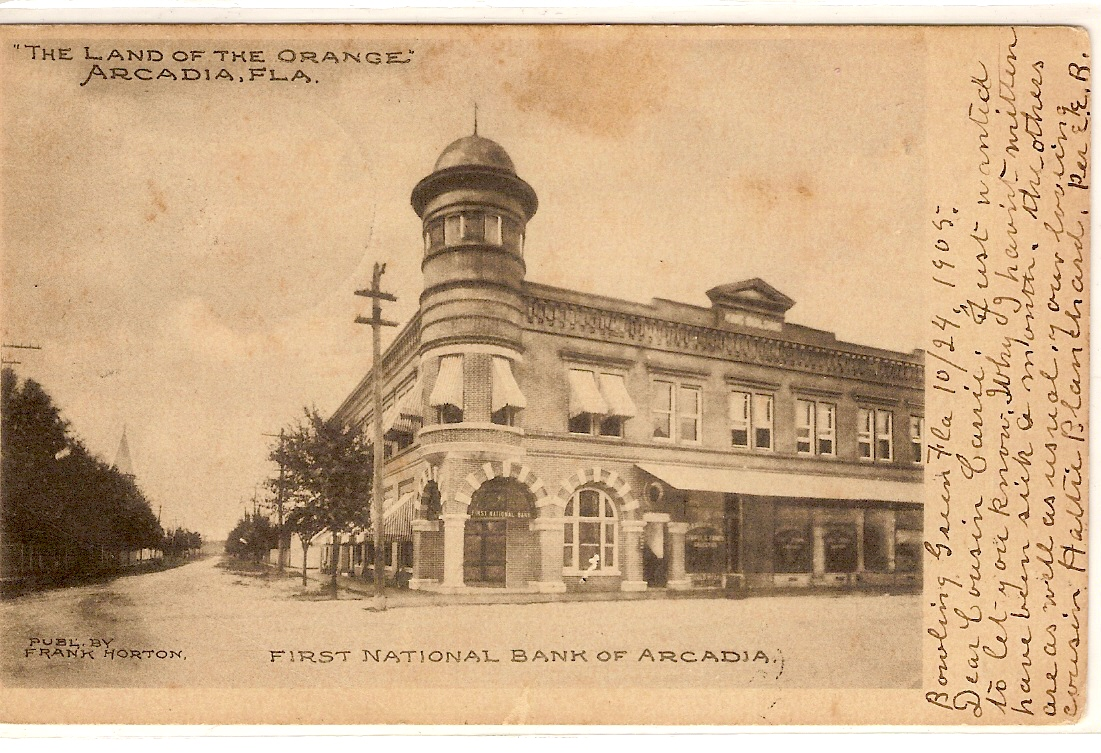
First National Bank of Arcadia pictured in this 1905 postcard

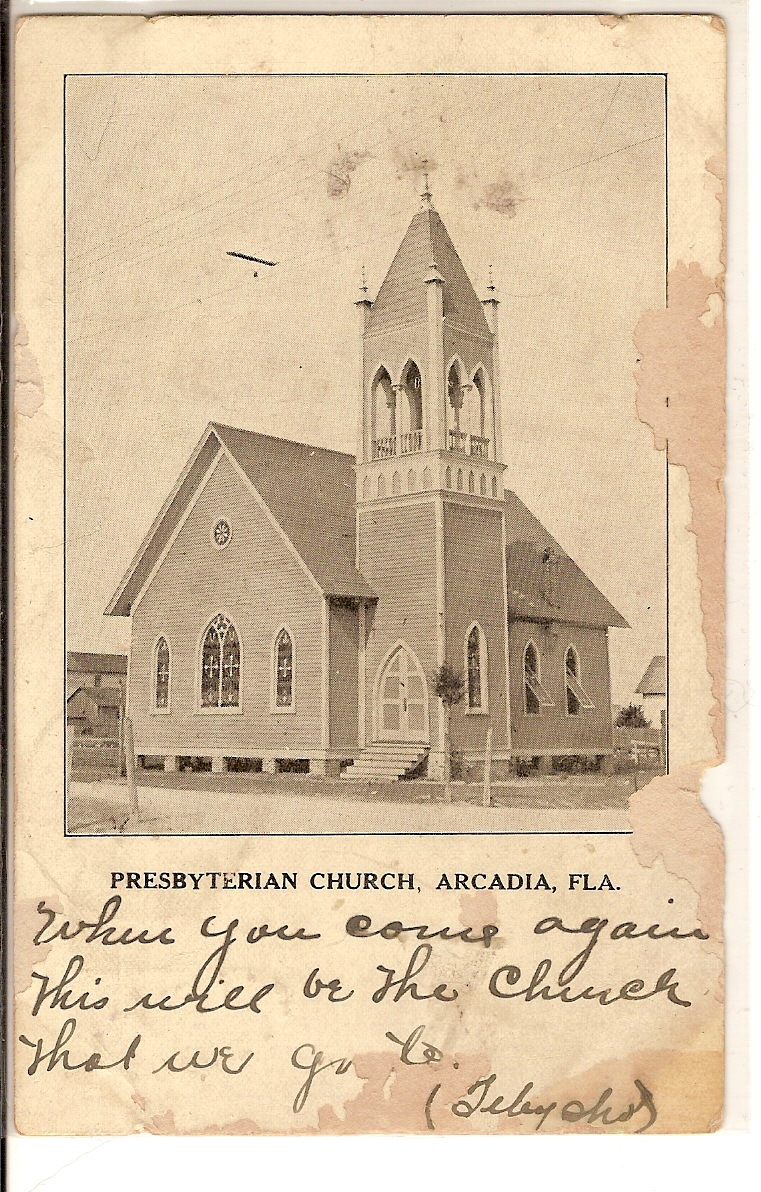
Presbyterian Church pictured in this 1907 postcard

In 1886, transportation improved in Arcadia when the Florida Southern Railway (later the Atlantic Coast Line Railroad) was built through Arcadia on its way from Bartow to Punta Gorda. The railway caused Arcadia to grow significantly, which led to it becoming incorporated a year later. A second railroad line, the Charlotte Harbor and Northern Railway (later the Seaboard Air Line Railroad), was built through Arcadia from 1907 to 1910 on its way from Mulberry to Boca Grande. Both lines have since been consolidated into a single line by CSX with the Seaboard line surviving north of Arcadia and the Atlantic Coast Line surviving to the south. Arcadia was also served by the short-lived East and West Coast Railway, which connected Arcadia with Bradenton from 1915 to 1934.

During the late 19th century Arcadia was the county seat of what would become many counties. In 1921, legislation enacted called for Arcadia to remain the county seat of DeSoto County and resulted in the creation of the present-day counties of Charlotte, Hardee, Glades and Highlands. Prior to this breakup, Arcadia's population had grown considerably, with over 1,000 permanent residents and 3,000 sq mi (7,800 km^{2}) for ranching.

On Thanksgiving Day in 1905, the town was destroyed by a fire that originated from a midtown livery stable. The fire was exacerbated because the town did not have a working water system or fire department. The estimated monetary damage was $250,000, but no loss of life occurred. Much of the business district was not spared. The town recovered only years later.

Oak Street is the "main street" in Arcadia. The downtown is far more elaborate than neighboring counties' downtown areas, as Arcadia is older and was their county seat prior to the formation of their present counties. Arcadia is also home to many early 20th-century homes, houses of worship, and several historic public buildings.

From 1917 to 1922, Arcadia was the home of Carlstrom Field, a grass airfield of the U.S. Army Air Service named for deceased aviation pioneer Victor Carlstrom. Carlstrom Field was used for pilot training both during and after World War I. In May 1941, the site again became an airfield for military primary flight training, operated by the Embry–Riddle Aeronautical Institute (now Embry–Riddle Aeronautical University). Carlstrom Field, one of several satellite fields in the Fort Myers area, also trained pilots for the Royal Air Force until its closing in 1945. 23 RAF cadets that died during training are commemorated in Oak Ridge Cemetery.

Arcadia's historic buildings include the Johnson-Smith House, William Oswell Ralls House, and Micajah T. Singleton House. Around 3,400 acres, which includes the downtown area, are part of the Arcadia Historic District.

After three Arcadia children, the Ray brothers, were diagnosed with HIV in 1986, school officials refused to let them attend school. The Ray family won a $1.1 million judgement against the county school system, but were forced to leave Arcadia after their home was burned down in 1987, in what has been described as "almost certainly a case of arson."

== Hurricane Charley and the 21st century ==
In 2004, Arcadia was heavily damaged by Hurricane Charley, during which the eye went over the city, with winds measured up to 109 mph (49 m/s) at 5:27 pm. The winds were suspected to be stronger outside the city, but cannot be proven due to the lack of equipment outside the city. The city's only shelter, the Turner Agri Civic Center, was a shelter made to withstand winds over 100 mph (45 m/s), but it collapsed during the storm. Everyone evacuated into the hallways and the kitchen of the Turner Center prior to the collapse. The people in the Turner Agri Civic Center were evacuated to DeSoto County High School, but soon, part of its roof collapsed. In the center of the town, the Old Opera House's roof was peeled off, causing severe water damage. The hurricane severely damaged downtown, especially businesses on Oak Street and Polk Street. Eventually, the Red Cross shelter was forced to evacuate due to the collapsing of the building. The city water tower crumpled along Florida State Road 70 and was never replaced after the hurricane. The city's only hospital was heavily damaged, with 35 windows shattering. Part of the roof peeled back, which exposed equipment and patients to the wind-driven rain. This caused an estimated $2.3 million in damages to the hospital. Hurricane Charley caused 3,600 homes to be destroyed or heavily damaged, and displaced 16,000 people. The exact amount of damage is not known, but it was ln the millions of dollars. Two people died in DeSoto County during the storm, and 150 people were injured. Many residents of the town left and never came back.

After Hurricane Charley, the people in DeSoto High School were taken to the middle school nearby, where at least 75 people spent the night in the middle school's gymnasium. The hurricane caused downtown to be heavily damaged. The storm caused 90% of homes in DeSoto County to be damaged and 60% to be uninhabitable or destroyed. The National Guard was deployed to the city and started the cleanup process and enforced a strict curfew in the city. The people of Arcadia came together and started helping each other after the storm, from feeding people to rebuilding. Although during the rebuilding process, the first wave of the Great Recession began, the people of Arcadia were able to rebuild their homes and bring new homes to the city. Downtown Arcadia was rebuilt, but some parts of the county are still damaged from Hurricane Charley. About 12 years were needed to rebuild, but parts of the city and county are still damaged from it.

In 2017, Hurricane Irma went over the city as a category 1 hurricane. It did not cause a huge amount of damage to the city. Some of the downtown area was damaged, with the Oak Park Inn taking considerable damage, and was not able to open for 4 months after the storm. Parts of DeSoto County were flooded, especially communities on the Peace River. The storm dropped 10-15 in of rain near Morgan Park on the Peace River. The river and its tributaries flooded roadways, homes, and parks. The damage extent is unknown.

In March 2020, Arcadia declared a local state of emergency in response to the COVID-19 pandemic. DeSoto county has had 10,174 cases of COVID-19.

On September 28, 2022, Hurricane Ian Made Landfall near Cayo Costa. The Hurricane struck as a strong Category 4 Hurricane, near Category 5 strength. The storm would go over the city of Arcadia as a Category 3 Hurricane. The Hurricane would cause major flooding along the Peace River, flooding homes and roads near or on the river. SR-72 collapsed, and buildings and homes in Arcadia would be damaged.

== Geography ==
Arcadia is located slightly northwest of the center of DeSoto County. The Peace River flows past the west side of the city on its way southwest to tidewater at Punta Gorda. Nearby Southeast Arcadia occupies a larger section of land, hosting a nearly equal, yet more dispersed population. Most of Arcadia is more than 40 feet (12 m) above sea level and portions of Arcadia near the center of the city are as high as 65 feet (20 m) above sea level, giving Arcadia one of the highest elevations for a city in Florida.

U.S. Route 17 passes through the center of Arcadia, leading north 50 miles (80 km) to Bartow and southwest 26 miles (42 km) to its terminus at Punta Gorda. Florida State Road 70 crosses US 17 in the center of Arcadia and leads east 64 miles (103 km) to Okeechobee and west-northwest 48 miles (77 km) to South Bradenton. Via SR 72, which splits from SR 70 just west of Arcadia, it is 44 miles (71 km) west to South Sarasota.

According to the United States Census Bureau, Arcadia has a total area of 4.1 square miles (10.6 km^{2}), of which 0.01 square miles (0.02 km^{2}), or 0.15%, is covered by water.

=== Climate ===
According to the Köppen climate classification, Arcadia has a humid subtropical climate (Cfa/Cwa), with hot, humid summers and warm, drier winters.

Climate data for Arcadia, Florida, 1991–2020 normals, extremes 1899–2021
Month	Jan	Feb	Mar	Apr	May	Jun	Jul	Aug	Sep	Oct	Nov	Dec	Year
Record high °F (°C)	88 (31)	92 (33)	95 (35)	98 (37)	103 (39)	104 (40)	101 (38)	101 (38)	98 (37)	98 (37)	93 (34)	89 (32)	104 (40)
Mean maximum °F (°C)	83.7 (28.7)	85.0 (29.4)	87.7 (30.9)	91.3 (32.9)	94.4 (34.7)	95.5 (35.3)	95.3 (35.2)	95.2 (35.1)	93.9 (34.4)	90.9 (32.7)	87.1 (30.6)	84.5 (29.2)	96.6 (35.9)
Mean daily maximum °F (°C)	73.5 (23.1)	76.1 (24.5)	80.0 (26.7)	84.2 (29.0)	89.1 (31.7)	90.7 (32.6)	91.4 (33.0)	91.6 (33.1)	89.9 (32.2)	85.6 (29.8)	79.5 (26.4)	75.4 (24.1)	83.9 (28.8)
Daily mean °F (°C)	60.3 (15.7)	63.1 (17.3)	66.5 (19.2)	71.1 (21.7)	76.4 (24.7)	80.0 (26.7)	81.3 (27.4)	81.6 (27.6)	80.1 (26.7)	74.8 (23.8)	67.6 (19.8)	63.1 (17.3)	72.2 (22.3)
Mean daily minimum °F (°C)	47.1 (8.4)	50.1 (10.1)	53.1 (11.7)	58.0 (14.4)	63.8 (17.7)	69.4 (20.8)	71.2 (21.8)	71.6 (22.0)	70.4 (21.3)	64.0 (17.8)	55.7 (13.2)	50.8 (10.4)	60.4 (15.8)
Mean minimum °F (°C)	30.4 (−0.9)	33.6 (0.9)	37.6 (3.1)	44.7 (7.1)	53.9 (12.2)	65.4 (18.6)	68.7 (20.4)	68.8 (20.4)	65.8 (18.8)	51.2 (10.7)	41.2 (5.1)	34.9 (1.6)	28.4 (−2.0)
Record low °F (°C)	18 (−8)	21 (−6)	26 (−3)	32 (0)	39 (4)	52 (11)	61 (16)	60 (16)	55 (13)	38 (3)	23 (−5)	18 (−8)	18 (−8)
Average precipitation inches (mm)	2.31 (59)	2.00 (51)	2.44 (62)	2.72 (69)	3.78 (96)	9.55 (243)	8.19 (208)	8.93 (227)	7.77 (197)	2.58 (66)	1.83 (46)	1.82 (46)	53.92 (1,370)
Average precipitation days (≥ 0.01 in)	5.3	4.8	4.9	5.1	6.4	14.1	15.2	15.9	12.6	6.3	4.4	5.1	100.1
Source 1: NOAA
Source 2: XMACIS2

== Demographics ==
Historical population
Census	Pop.	Note	%±
1900	799		—
1910	1,736		117.3%
1920	3,479		100.4%
1930	4,082		17.3%
1940	4,055		−0.7%
1950	4,764		17.5%
1960	5,889		23.6%
1970	5,658		−3.9%
1980	6,002		6.1%
1990	6,488		8.1%
2000	6,604		1.8%
2010	7,637		15.6%
2020	7,420		−2.8%
U.S. Decennial Census

=== Racial and ethnic composition ===
Arcadia racial composition (Hispanics excluded from racial categories) (NH = Non-Hispanic)
Race	Pop 2010	Pop 2020	% 2010	% 2020
White (NH)	3,062	2,905	40.09%	39.15%
Black or African American (NH)	1,876	1,825	24.56%	24.60%
Native American or Alaska Native (NH)	10	12	0.13%	0.16%
Asian (NH)	51	67	0.67%	0.90%
Pacific Islander or Native Hawaiian (NH)	0	0	0.00%	0.00%
Some other race (NH)	8	23	0.10%	0.31%
Two or more races/Multiracial (NH)	96	232	1.26%	3.13%
Hispanic or Latino (any race)	2,534	2,356	33.18%	31.75%
Total	7,637	7,420		

=== 2020 census ===
As of the 2020 census, Arcadia had a population of 7,420. The median age was 34.6 years. 27.1% of residents were under the age of 18 and 15.0% were 65 years of age or older. For every 100 females there were 97.1 males, and for every 100 females age 18 and over there were 92.3 males age 18 and over.

99.0% of residents lived in urban areas, while 1.0% lived in rural areas.

There were 2,618 households in Arcadia, of which 39.8% had children under the age of 18 living in them. Of all households, 35.6% were married-couple households, 20.3% were households with a male householder and no spouse or partner present, and 36.4% were households with a female householder and no spouse or partner present. About 26.8% of all households were made up of individuals and 13.5% had someone living alone who was 65 years of age or older.

There were 3,089 housing units, of which 15.2% were vacant. The homeowner vacancy rate was 2.7% and the rental vacancy rate was 11.0%.

=== Demographic estimates ===
In 2020, there were 1,755 families residing in the city.

In 2020, about 5.1% of the population were under 5 years old and 49.9% of the population were female.

In 2020, 256 veterans were living in the city and 14.7% of the population were foreign-born. About 69.5% of the households had a computer and 58.0% had a broadband internet subscription. Around 80.9% of the population 25 and older were high-school graduates and 15.2% of that same population had a bachelor's degree or higher. Around 7.4% of the population under 65 had a disability and 17.3% of that same population did not have health insurance.

=== Income and poverty ===
In 2020, the median household income was $34,003 and the per capita income was $18,376; 30.2% of the population lived below the poverty threshold.

=== 2010 census ===
As of the 2010 United States census, there were 7,637 people, 2,460 households, and 1,664 families residing in the city.

== Government ==
The City of Arcadia was created by an act of the Florida Legislature in 1886. Currently, the city is governed by a mayor-council form of government, with five council members elected at large to four-year terms of office, who in turn appoint a city manager to run the daily operation of the city. The council annually chooses a mayor and deputy mayor, who serve in the capacity of chairman of meetings and at ceremonial functions. Also elected by the residents is a city marshal who acts as chief of police. In addition to police service, the city provides residents with a water/sewer system, trash pickup, planning and zoning services, and public works.

== Transportation ==
Arcadia Municipal Airport is a public-use airport located 1 mile (1.6 km) southeast of the central business district. The City of Arcadia operates the day-to-day operations of the airport. The airport has a deep history of aviation, with the old Carlstrom and Dorr training fields in DeSoto County. It is leading the state in low fuel prices and has a fly-in and camp facility called Aviation City. Arcadia Municipal Airport hosts an annual Aviation Day event in March. The event consists of a static display of aircraft, biplane rides, helicopter rides, and a skydiving demonstration, but bigger plans are in the works.

== Recreation and events ==
Arcadia is located on the Peace River, the major tributary of the Charlotte Harbor estuary. The river offers fine canoeing, shark-tooth hunting, and natural habitats. Tours, recreational accessories, and accommodations are readily available.

Arcadia hosts DeSoto County's annual fair usually in the month of January. While traditional aspects of a fair or carnival are provided, the event also presents livestock shows consisting of swine and cattle, which are presented by the local FFA and 4-H.

Arcadia is also the home of three rodeos. These events, which are managed by the local rodeo association, occur during the month of March, the Fourth of July holiday, and in the fall. From the profits of these events many local charities, college scholarships and causes receive funding.

Arcadia is one of the largest groupings of antique dealers in the state, all located conveniently in the downtown area. The local dealers' association sponsors a "4th Saturday Antique Fair" each month from 8 am to 3 pm, bringing an additional 60 to 120 independent dealers in for the event.

Arcadia has numerous parades throughout the year—a Martin Luther King Jr. Day parade, a March rodeo parade, a Cinco de Mayo parade, an Independence Day parade, an October Homecoming parade, a Veterans Day parade, and a Christmas parade.

== Media ==
- WCXS (1480 Classic Country)
- WSRQ-FM (106.9 SRQ)
- WZSP-FM (105.3 La Zeta)
- The Arcadian, local print newspaper

== Notable people ==
- Al Alberts - lead singer of The Four Aces
- Christina Bohannan, Iowa House of Representatives and Candidate for Congress in Iowa's 1st Congressional District in 2022
- Chris Clemons - professional National Football League player for the Miami Dolphins and Arizona Cardinals
- James L. Dozier - retired US Army general
- Brian Labrie - reality TV star and world record holder from the Science Channel’s Punkin’ Chunkin’ TV show
- T. J. Luther - professional football player in the NFL
- Bitsy Mott - born in Arcadia, Major League Baseball player
- Ray brothers - HIV activists
- Joey Redner - founder of Cigar City Brewing Company
- James Joseph Richardson, man wrongly convicted of poisoning his seven young children in October 1967
- John Paul Riddle - co-founder of Embry-Riddle Aeronautical University
- Brad Scott - former head coach at the University of South Carolina
- Jeff Scott - head football coach of the South Florida Bulls
- Chesterfield Smith - president of the American Bar Association in 1973–1974

== Gallery ==
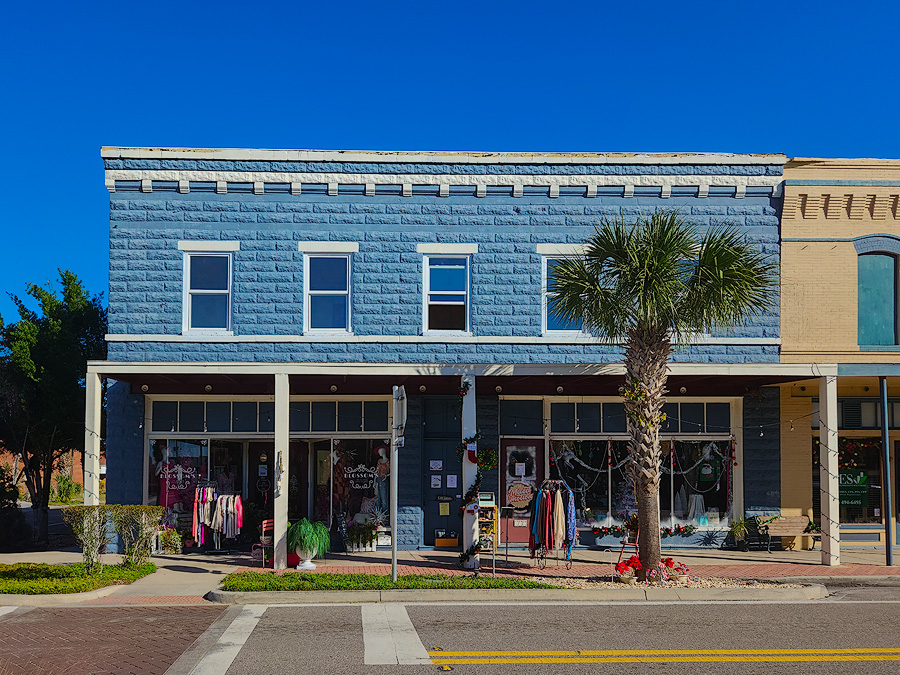
Vintage clothing store in Arcadia's main street

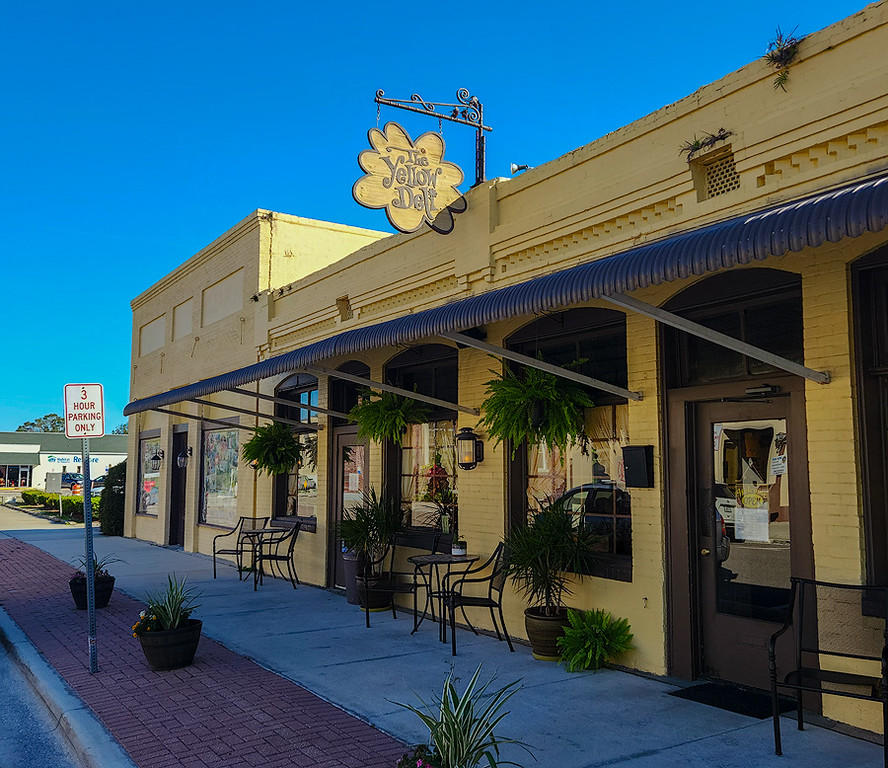
The Yellow Deli

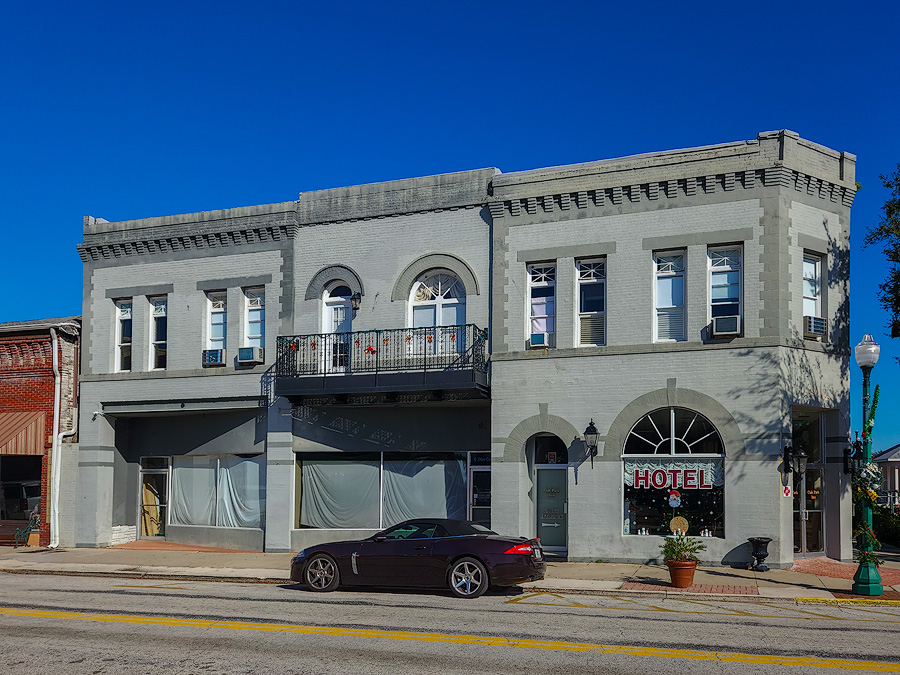
Oak Park Inn

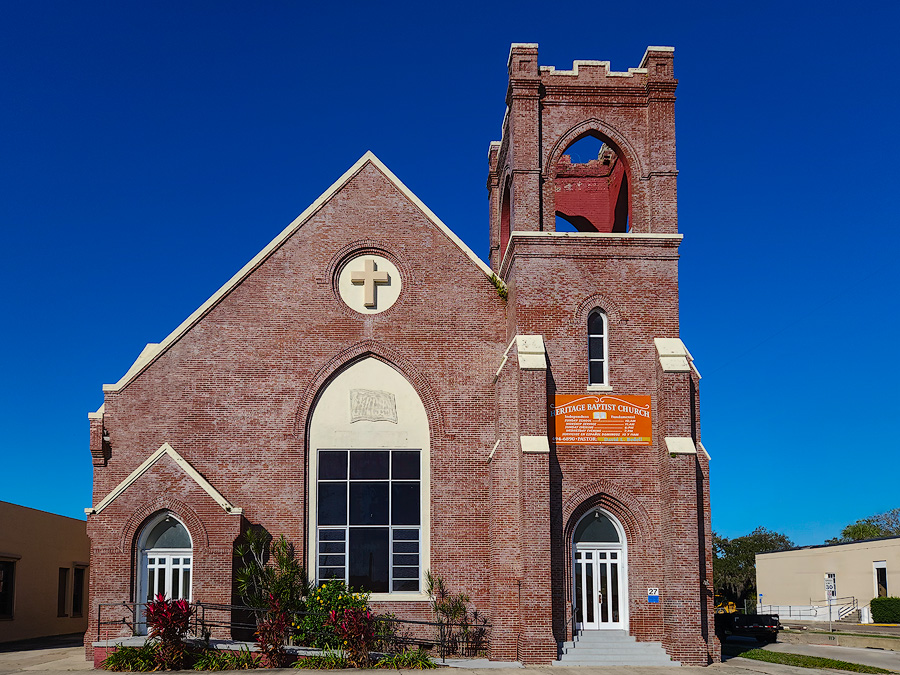
Heritage Baptist Church
