= Venice station (Florida) =

Venice Seaboard Air Line Railway Station
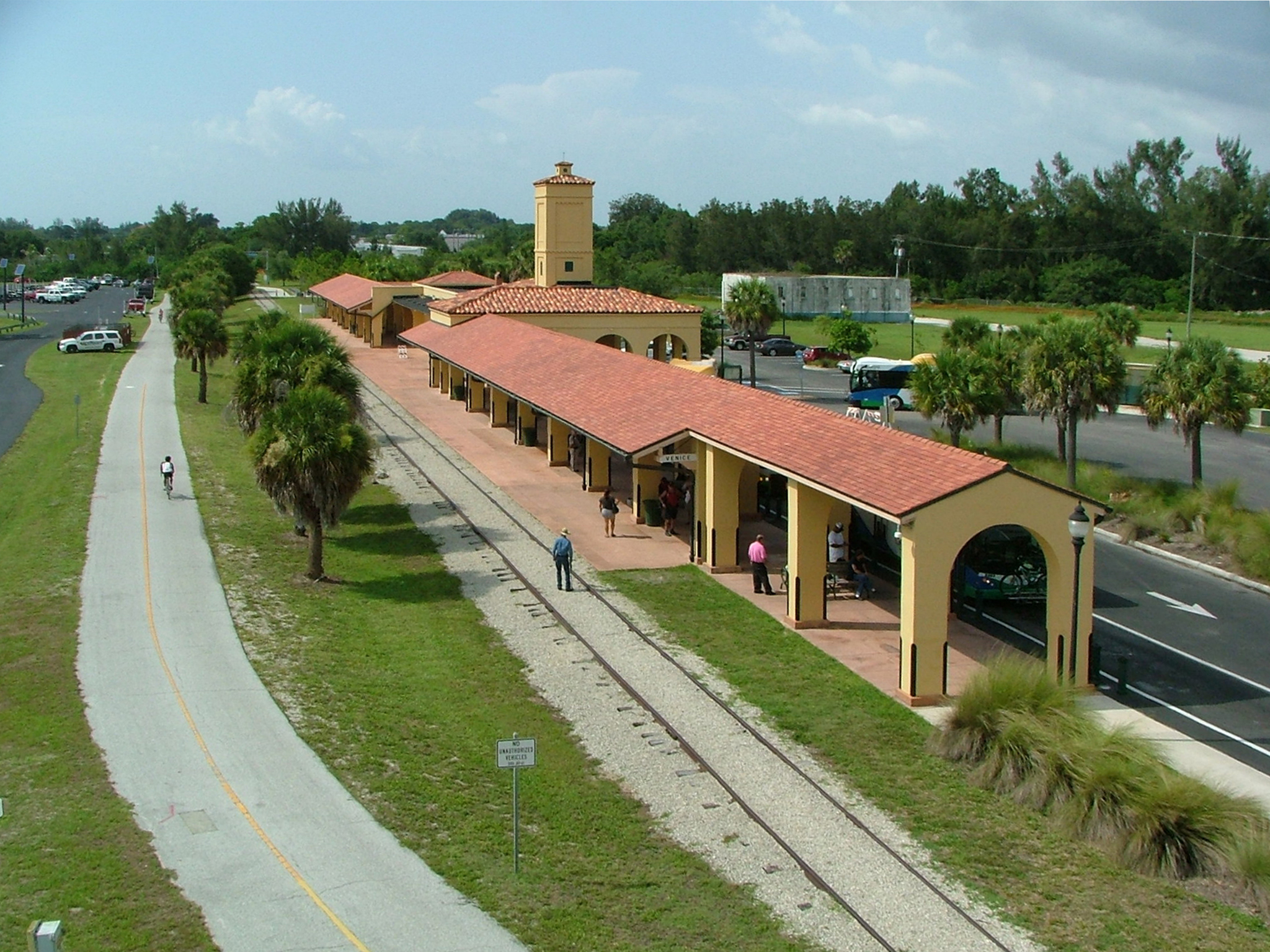
- Interactive map of the Venice Seaboard Air Line Railway Station area
- Alternative names: Venice Depot

General information
- Architectural style: Mission/Spanish Revival
- Location: Venice, Florida, U.S., 303 East Venice Avenue, United States
- Coordinates: 27°06′03″N 82°26′25″W
- Opened: March 27, 1927
- Cost: $47,000 ($688,256 in 2024 dollars)
- Client: Brotherhood of Locomotive Engineers
- Owner: Sarasota County

Dimensions
- Diameter: 400 ft × 50 ft (122 m × 15 m)

Design and construction
- Architecture firm: Walker & Gillette
- Venice Seaboard Air Line Railway Station
- U.S. National Register of Historic Places
- Location within Florida Location within the United States
- MPS: Venice MPS
- NRHP reference No.: 89001072
- Added to NRHP: August 17, 1989

The Venice Seaboard Air Line Railway Station (also known as the Venice Depot) is a historic former Seaboard Air Line Railroad depot located at 303 East Venice Avenue in Venice, Florida. It is the southern trailhead of the Legacy Trail, which runs along the railroad's former right of way. It currently serves as a hub for bus service operated by Sarasota County Area Transit (SCAT). On August 17, 1989, it was added to the U.S. National Register of Historic Places.

== History ==
In the 1870s, Richard Roberts established a homestead near Roberts Bay. In 1884, he sold a portion of his holdings to Frank Higel. Higel established a citrus operation involving the production of several lines of canned citrus items, and for the next 30 years the Higel family members were boat builders, fishermen, grove caretakers and contractors. Darwin Curry was the first postmaster. The Higel and Curry families chose the name "Venice" for their community post office, located south of Shakett Creek on what is now Portia Street in the unincorporated community of Nokomis.

The Seaboard Air Line (SAL) was the first railroad to expand its network into Sarasota County, Florida, extending tracks first to Sarasota in 1903 and Fruitville in 1905. The SAL extended their network into Venice in 1911, at the instigation of Mrs. Potter ("Bertha") Palmer, whose family had just purchased thousands of acres south of Fruitville and adjacent to the Venice area. The first depot in Venice was located originally at the junction of what is now Tampa and Nokomis Avenues.

In 1925, Fred H. Albee purchased 2,916 acres (1,180 ha) of land from the Venice-Sarasota Company. Albee had previously developed Nokomis and built its first luxury hotel, known as the Pollyanna Inn. Albee asked John Nolen to design a city on his land, but Albee did not have a chance to implement his city plan before he was approached with a proposal from the Brotherhood of Locomotive Engineers (BLE) to purchase the land in October 1925. The purchase was motivated by a desire by the BLE to increase the union's assets and holdings in the area.

The BLE Realty Corporation was organized to develop the area, and the Venice Company was created to market property. The company retained Nolen to complete a city plan in 1926. Nolen moved the SAL tracks eastward to the present location of the Venice depot. The new depot was designed by New York architectural firm of Walker & Gillette (still extant today under the name Swanke Hayden Connell Architects), who the BLE retained to design most of the new buildings they were planning for Venice. Walker & Gillette designed the depot in harmony with the other structures in Venice, adopting a Mediterranean Revival style then highly popular in Florida due to its warm climate and Spanish heritage. The spare, unornamented exterior yellow stucco surfaces, in combination with the simple arched and blocky volumes gently-sloping red tile roofs seen in the depot building are the hallmarks of this style. The structure of the building under the stucco used a hollow clay tile.

For a town as small as Venice was, the train station was commodious, boasting a 400-foot-long platform, baggage and freight rooms, a prominent tower, extensive arcades spanning the length of the platform, and (as was normal in much of the United States at the time) segregated white and colored waiting rooms. As Venice was a planned city, the large size of the depot can probably be explained by its founders' hopes that it would grow to the point where it would require such a grand reception for prodigious rail service. The total cost of the depot was $47,500. It opened for service on March 27, 1927.

The Venice Seaboard Air Line Depot became an important point of transit for the city over the next forty-five years. It was served by great SCL trains such as the Camellia and the Orange Blossom Special. The station regularly welcomed Kentucky Military Institute students and faculty for annual winter terms, beginning in January 1933. It became the primary point of entry to the city for U.S. Army material and personnel once the Army established an air base in Venice in 1942, during World War II.

The SAL ran a section of its Silver Meteor, from Tampa to Bradenton, Sarasota and finally to the Venice station. The Silver Meteor offered through coaches and sleepers (no transfer needed) from New York City on this section. In 1960s, when passenger rail traffic had become moribund across the US, the Ringling Bros. and Barnum and Bailey Circus used it for shipping their equipment and operations around the country once they moved to Venice in 1960. Operations were taken over by the new Seaboard Coast Line in 1967 when it was formed from the merger of the SAL and its rival, the Atlantic Coast Line Railway. Passenger service to the station finally ceased on April 30, 1971 with the consolidation of nearly all the nation's passenger trains into the new National Railroad Passenger Corporation (Amtrak), which came into existence the following day, May 1. The last passenger train crew operating from Venice to Tampa on April 30, 1971 consisted of Frank Riddle, Engineer; James Marshall, Conductor; John Scott, Fireman and (unknown), Baggage Master.

In 1998, Sarasota County acquired the building, which is the last extant railroad depot in its jurisdiction, and local government undertook restoration of the structure, including archaeological excavations. Today the city of Venice has incorporated the grounds of the historic depot into the Venetian Waterway Park, which covers both banks of the Gulf Intracoastal Waterway, bordering the depot's grounds to the west. The SAL tracks have largely been removed and the station now houses the Venice Area Historical Society Museum, along with event space that can be privately rented. Bus service to the area is provided from the arcaded waiting area at the south end of the station. A former red Seaboard Air Line freight car, now restored and used as offices for the Historical Society, stands beyond the station's north end adjacent to a large freestanding wooden deck. A historic marker was installed by the Sarasota County Historical Commissions in 2003.

== Gallery ==
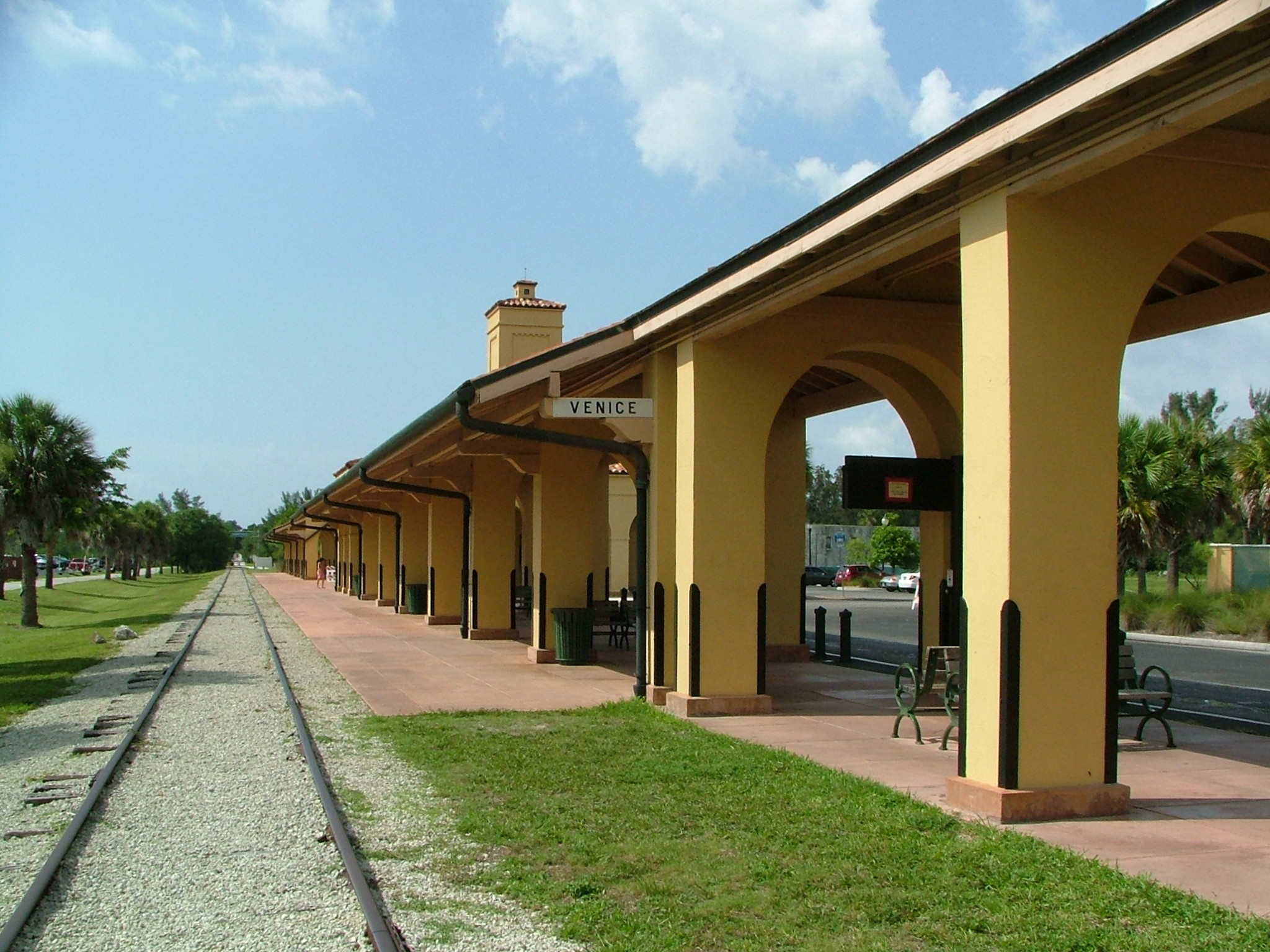
Viewing depot from south end of station platform and railroad tracks.

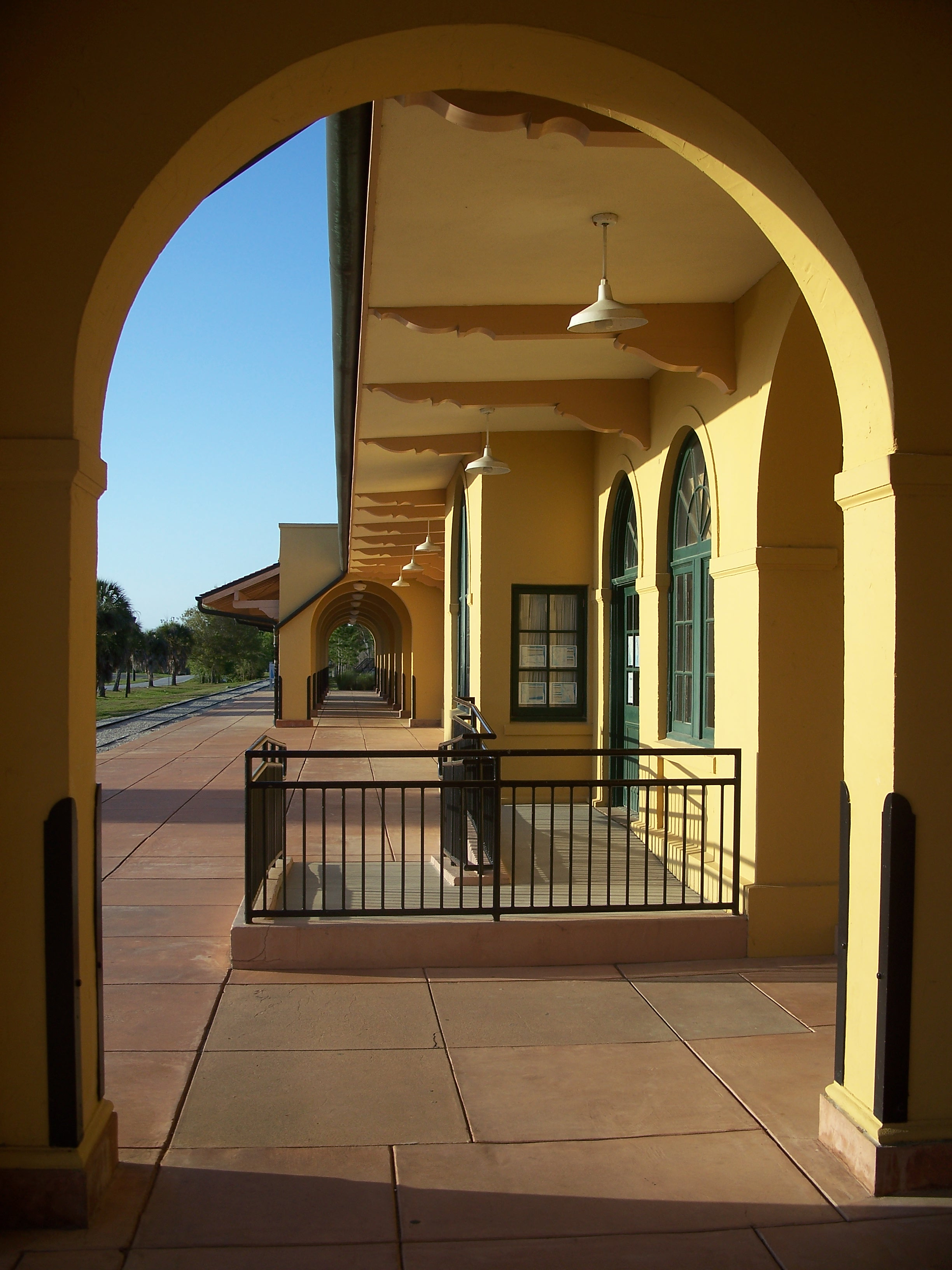
View of depot platform through archway.

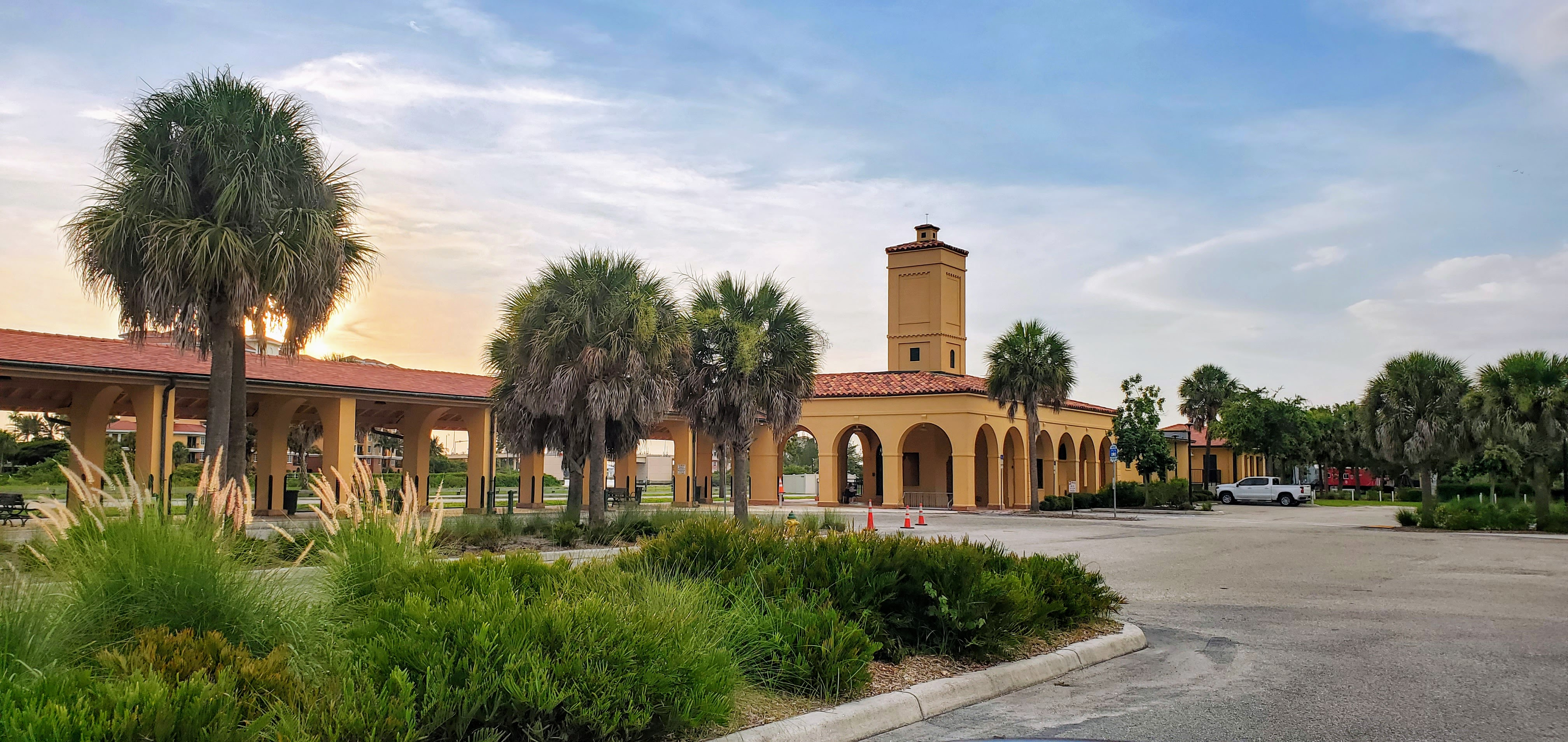
View of Depot from parking lot.

Preceding station	Seaboard Air Line Railroad	Following station
Terminus	Sarasota Subdivision	Nokomis toward Turkey Creek
