= Palmer Ranch, Florida =

Palmer Ranch
- Census-designated place
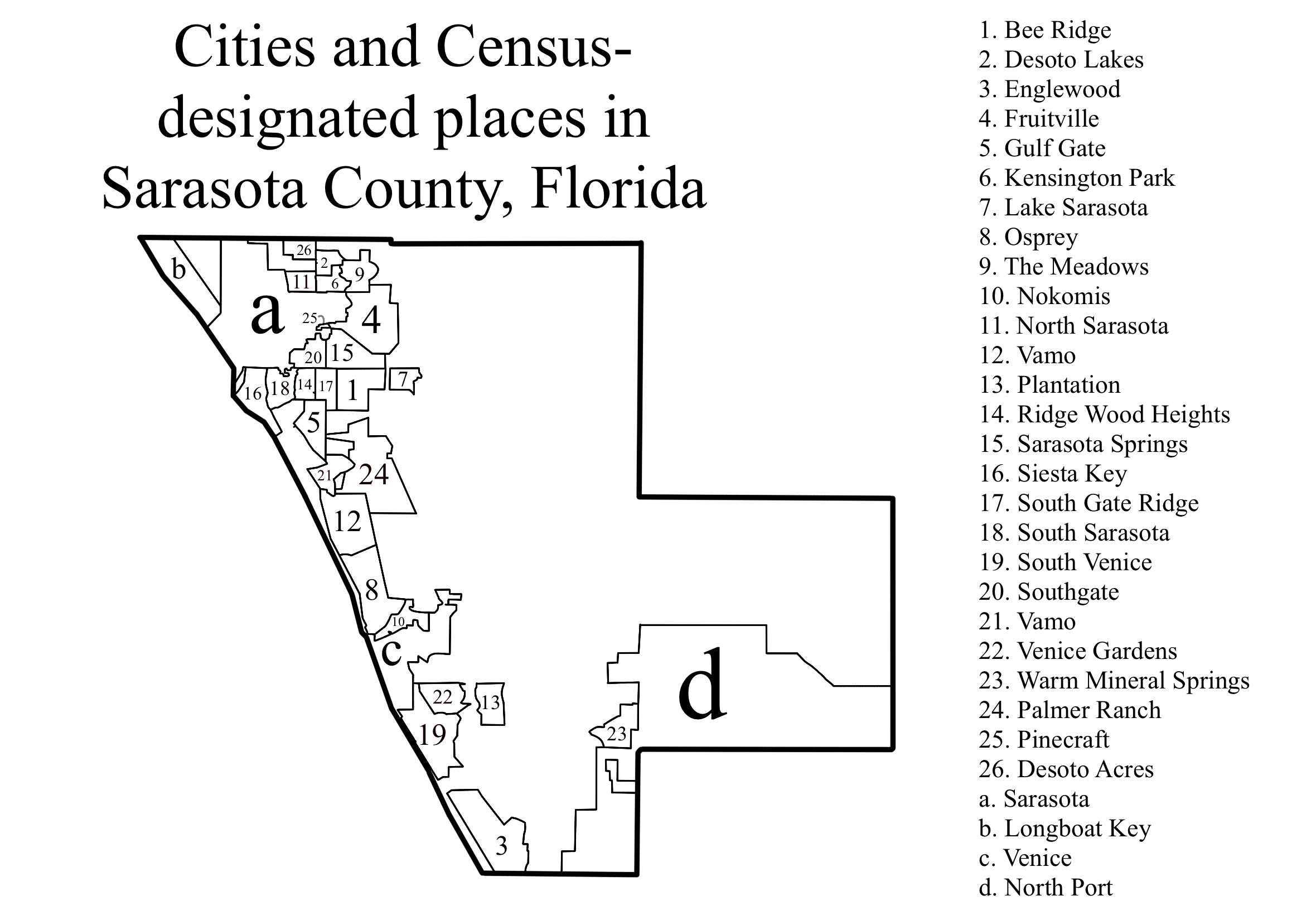
- Location within the state of Florida Palmer Ranch in Sarasota County (24).
- Coordinates: 27°14′36″N 82°28′14″W
- Country: United States
- State: Florida
- Counties: Sarasota
- Established: December 18, 1984

Government
  - Type: CDD, HOA
- Elevation: 16 ft (4.9 m)

Population (2020)
  - Total: 14,966
- Time zone: UTC−05:00 (EST)
  - Summer (DST): UTC−04:00 (EDT)
- ZIP codes: 34238
- Area code: 941
- GNIS feature ID: 2805186
- Website: palmerranch.net

Palmer Ranch is a census-designated place and planned community in Sarasota County, Florida between the cities of Sarasota and Osprey. The population was 14,966 at the 2020 census. It is part of the North Port-Bradenton-Sarasota, Florida Metropolitan Statistical Area. Palmer Ranch encompasses approximately 6,733 acres (2,725 ha), bounded by Clark Road to the north, U.S. Route 41 to the west, Interstate 75 to the east, and approximately where State Road 681 and the Legacy Trail meet to the south. The area was part of the original 80,000 acres (320 km^{2}) of Florida land purchased by Bertha Palmer, wife of Chicago businessman Potter Palmer.

== History ==
Bertha Palmer, known as Mrs. Potter Palmer, came to Sarasota in 1910, and resided on Little Sarasota Bay for her winter home. She improved agricultural methods to the land, added lavish gardens and buildings, which is now the Historic Spanish Point garden and historic site. While the house The Oaks is gone, outbuildings and landscape remain, including remnants of designs by Achilles Duchene, after whom the Duchene Garden is named. Other former Palmer family holdings now open to the public include the Myakka River State Park and an expansion of Oscar Scherer State Park. After her death, Bertha Palmer gave the land to her sons Potter Jr. and Honore, who continued developing the property as a ranch.

Hugh Culverhouse, founder of the Tampa Bay Buccaneers, bought 12,000 acres (4,900 ha) of the remaining land in 1972. Palmer Ranch was established in December 1984 as a Development of Regional Impact (DRI) under Section 380.06 of the Florida Statutes.

== Demographics ==
Palmer Ranch first appeared as a census designated place in the 2020 U.S. census.

=== 2020 census ===
As of the 2020 census, Palmer Ranch had a population of 14,966. The median age was 65.5 years. 9.5% of residents were under the age of 18 and 51.1% of residents were 65 years of age or older. For every 100 females there were 84.3 males, and for every 100 females age 18 and over there were 83.3 males age 18 and over.

100.0% of residents lived in urban areas, while 0.0% lived in rural areas.

There were 7,726 households in Palmer Ranch, of which 11.8% had children under the age of 18 living in them. Of all households, 53.7% were married-couple households, 12.9% were households with a male householder and no spouse or partner present, and 28.9% were households with a female householder and no spouse or partner present. About 33.0% of all households were made up of individuals and 22.0% had someone living alone who was 65 years of age or older.

There were 9,690 housing units, of which 20.3% were vacant. The homeowner vacancy rate was 2.8% and the rental vacancy rate was 18.1%.

Racial composition as of the 2020 census
Race	Number	Percent
White	13,038	87.1%
Black or African American	204	1.4%
American Indian and Alaska Native	17	0.1%
Asian	440	2.9%
Native Hawaiian and Other Pacific Islander	8	0.1%
Some other race	238	1.6%
Two or more races	1,021	6.8%
Hispanic or Latino (of any race)	1,022	6.8%
