= Legacy Trail =

Legacy Trail may refer to the following trails in the United States:

- Legacy Trail (Florida), in Sarasota County, Florida
- Legacy Trail (Oklahoma), a cycleway
