= Venice station =

Venice station may refer to:

- Venezia Mestre railway station, a junction station in Venice, Italy
- Venezia Santa Lucia railway station, the central station in Venice, Italy
- Venice station (Florida), a former railroad depot in Venice, Florida, United States
