= Florida State Road 681 =

State highway in Florida, United States

State Road 681
- Venice Connector / US 41 Connector
- SR 681 highlighted in red

Route information
- Maintained by FDOT
- Length: 4.142 mi (6.666 km)
- Existed: 1980–present

Major junctions
- South end: US 41 in Nokomis
- North end: I-75 near Sarasota

Location
- Country: United States
- State: Florida
- Counties: Sarasota

Highway system
- Florida State Highway System; Interstate; US; State; Former; Pre‑1945; Toll; Scenic
← SR 679	SR 681	→ SR 682

State Road 681 (SR 681), also known as the Venice Connector, is a four-mile-long (6.4 km) spur of Interstate 75 (SR 93) near Nokomis, Florida. The road operated as the southern terminus of the expressway in the early 1980s before Interstate 75 extended south to Naples.

== Route description ==
SR 681 begins at an interchange with US 41/SR 45 in Nokomis, heading north as a four-lane freeway. The road passes through developments, coming to a bridge over the Legacy Trail, a rail trail. The freeway heads northeast coming to an at-grade signalized intersection with Honore Avenue. A short distance later, SR 681 merges onto the northbound direction of I-75/SR 93 at an interchange.

== History ==
State Road 681 opened to traffic in 1980 when segments of Interstate 75 between Tampa and Naples were still under construction. At the time, it served as the southern terminus of Interstate 75. An access management plan, coordinated between Florida Department of Transportation (FDOT) and Sarasota County, for SR 681 was adopted in December 2005 to establish access points along the limited-access road, reclassifying the road as a "modified" limited access road. The access management plan established the planned locations of at-grade intersections along SR 681 for future growth adjacent to the highway.

In April 2016, the final phase of Sarasota County's Honore Avenue extension was completed. The project extended Honore Avenue from SR 681 to Laurel Road, providing signalized intersections at both limits. This also made Honore Avenue the first contiguous road to run from Venice north to the Sarasota County line since 1982, when State Road 681 was constructed. Previously, US 41 and I-75 were the only continuous north–south thoroughfares linking Venice and Sarasota.

== Major intersections ==
The entire route is in Sarasota County.

Location	mi	km	Destinations	Notes
Nokomis	0.000	0.000	US 41 (SR 45) – Osprey, Venice, Gulf Beaches	interchange
	1.448– 1.531	2.330– 2.464	Legacy Trail underpass	
	2.709	4.360	Honore Avenue	
	4.142	6.666	I-75 north (SR 93) – Tampa	I-75 exit 200
1.000 mi = 1.609 km; 1.000 km = 0.621 mi
