= Oscar Scherer State Park =

State park in Florida, United States

- IUCN category IV (habitat/species management area)
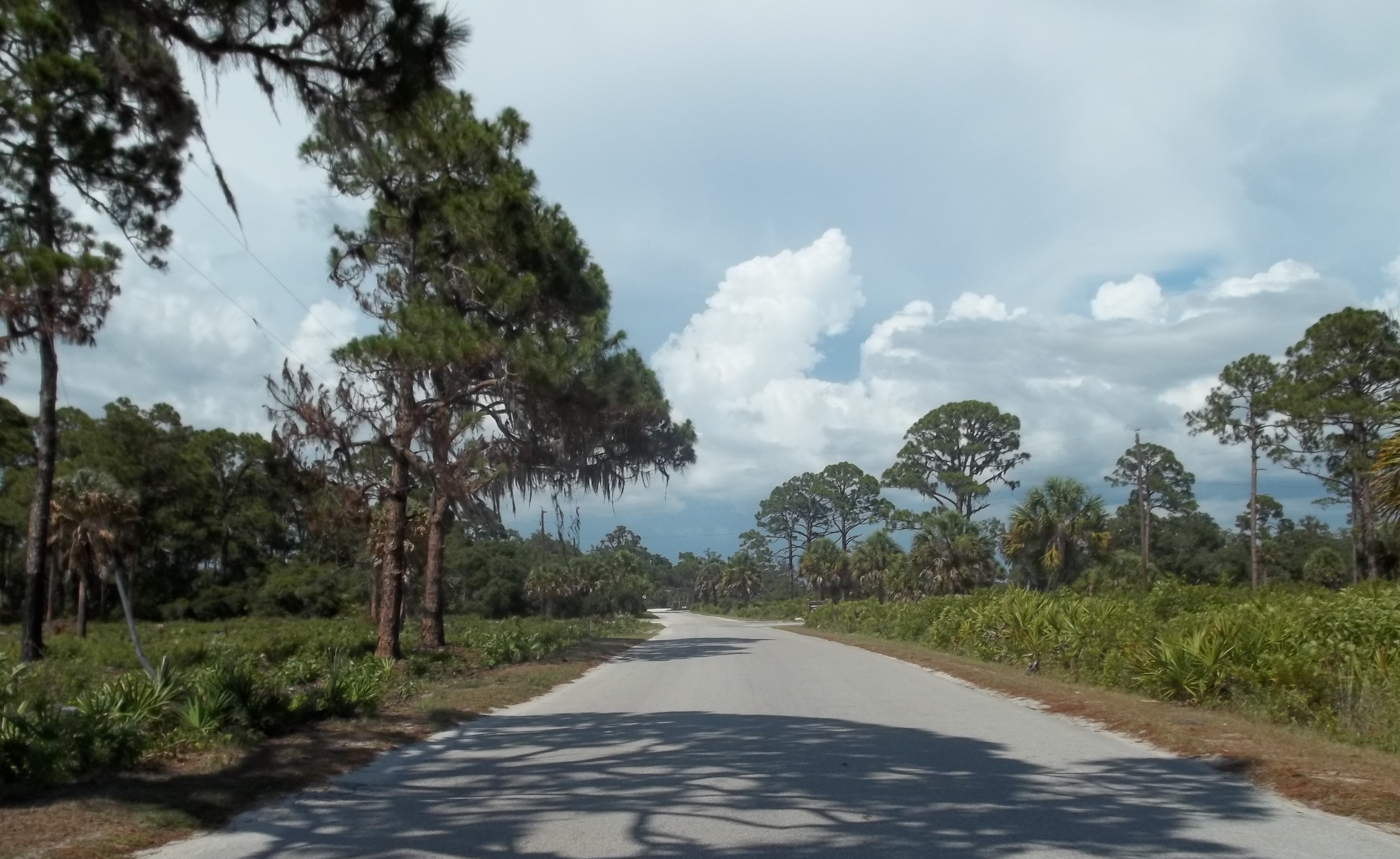
- A view down the trail

- Location within Florida
- Interactive map of Oscar Scherer State Park
- Location: Sarasota County, Florida, USA
- Nearest city: Osprey, Florida
- Coordinates: 27°10′30″N 82°27′58″W
- Area: 1,400 acres (5.7 km^{2})
- Established: 1956
- Governing body: Florida Department of Environmental Protection

Oscar Scherer State Park is a Florida State Park located between Sarasota and Venice, near Osprey. The address is 1843 South Tamiami Trail. It receives more than 250,000 visitors a year. The park is home to habitat for various plants and animals including birds such as the Florida scrub jay, bald eagles, and butterflies. It has areas for cycling, hiking, and paddle craft boating.

== History ==
Establishment of the park began after Elsa Scherer Burrows, owner of the 462-acre (1.87 km^{2}) South Creek Ranch, died in 1955. She stipulated in her will that the land was to be used only as a public park, for public recreation, and a wildlife sanctuary. It was to be dedicated to the memory of her father, Oscar Scherer, who achieved great success in the leather-tanning business. The park opened to the public in summer 1956.

In 1986, Jon Thaxton, a realtor and environmentalist, started work to protect neighboring Florida scrub jay habitat. In 1992 this resulted in 922 acres (3.73 km^{2}) being added from the adjacent Palmer Ranch that had been among the holdings of Bertha Honoré Palmer, in large part due to the Nature Conservancy, public support, and the use of Preservation 2000 funds, expanding the park's size to 1,384 acres (5.60 km^{2}). It was also the state's first Florida Forever land acquisition.

In September 2008, in recognition of National Public Lands Day, Lee Wetherington, a local developer and long-time park supporter, donated an additional 16.6 acres (0.067 km^{2}) of land to the park, including the buffer property adjacent to the Willowbend subdivision (a Wetherington development), bringing the total park size to 1,400 acres (5.7 km^{2}).

== Biology ==
=== Flora ===
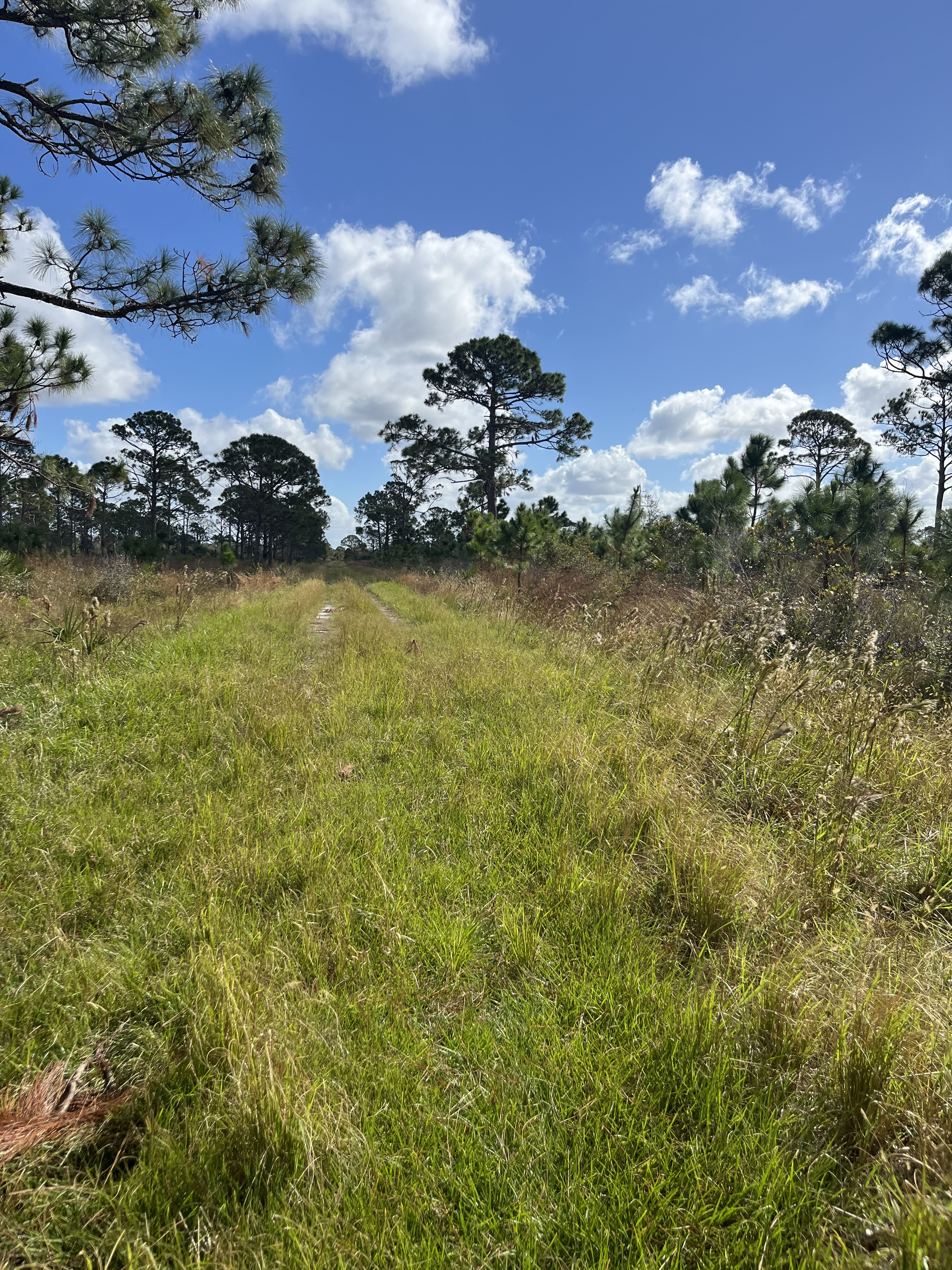
Grassy area on the Blue Trail at Oscar Scherer State Park

The habitats that are part of the park are pine flatwoods, scrubby flatwoods and the hardwood hammock surrounding South Creek. A variety of other plants exist within the park, like live oak, saw palmetto, blueberry, persimmon, wild grape, cabbage palm, coontie, wax myrtle, prickly pear cacti, blackroot, beautyberry, mangrove trees and giant leather ferns (Acrostichum danaeifolium).

=== Fauna ===
Land and aquatic inhabitants include bobcats, rabbits, foxes, North American river otters, American alligators, eastern indigo snakes (Drymarchon couperi), gopher tortoises and gopher frogs.

The park is one of the few places in the state where there are enough scrubby flatwoods for the Florida scrub jay to maintain a healthy population. Other birds that can be seen in the park are bald eagles, ospreys, warblers, woodpeckers, egrets, and the great blue and little blue heron.

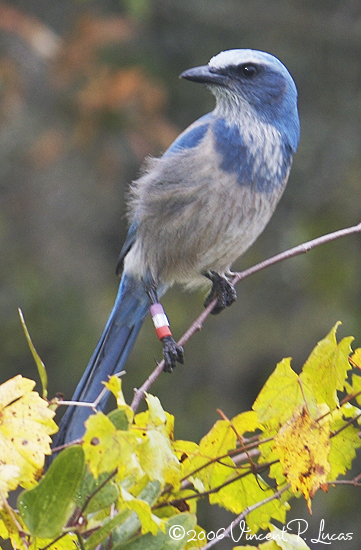

The 3-acre (12,000 m^{2}) freshwater Lake Osprey has bream, bluegill, largemouth bass and channel catfish, among others. South Creek is brackish, so it can contain saltwater fish. The creek begins north of the park, receives rainfall and freshwater runoff, and its water level varies with the tides.

Various butterflies can be seen in the park including the zebra swallowtail whose caterpillars feed on pawpaw (Asimina).

== Recreational activities ==
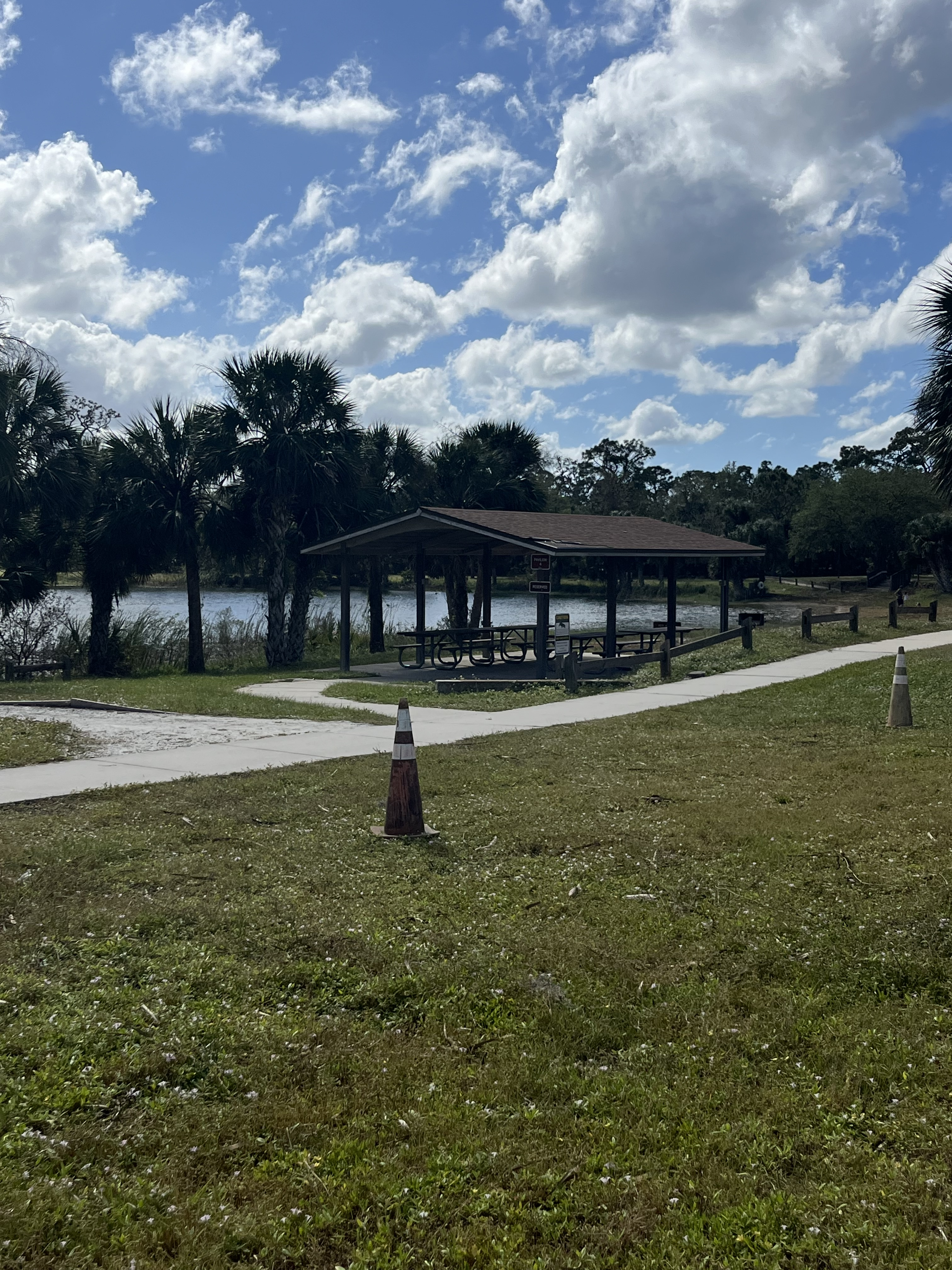
Lake Osprey in Oscar Scherer State Park

The park offers beaches, bicycling, boating, canoeing, fishing, hiking, kayaking, picnicking, snorkeling, swimming and wildlife viewing. It also has an interpretive exhibit and visitor center. The Legacy Trail, which runs on a former railroad route, also runs through and connects with the park.

== See also ==
- Historic Spanish Point
