= Nokomis, Florida =

- Census-designated place
- Location in Sarasota County and the state of Florida
- Coordinates: 27°07′37″N 82°25′59″W
- Country: United States
- State: Florida
- County: Sarasota

Area
  - Total: 2.29 sq mi (5.94 km^{2})
  - Land: 1.95 sq mi (5.05 km^{2})
  - Water: 0.34 sq mi (0.89 km^{2})
- Elevation: 13 ft (4.0 m)

Population (2020)
  - Total: 3,217
  - Density: 1,650.9/sq mi (637.42/km^{2})
- Time zone: UTC−5 (Eastern (EST))
  - Summer (DST): UTC−4 (EDT)
- ZIP Codes: 34274–34275
- Area code: 941
- FIPS code: 12-48875
- GNIS feature ID: 2403338

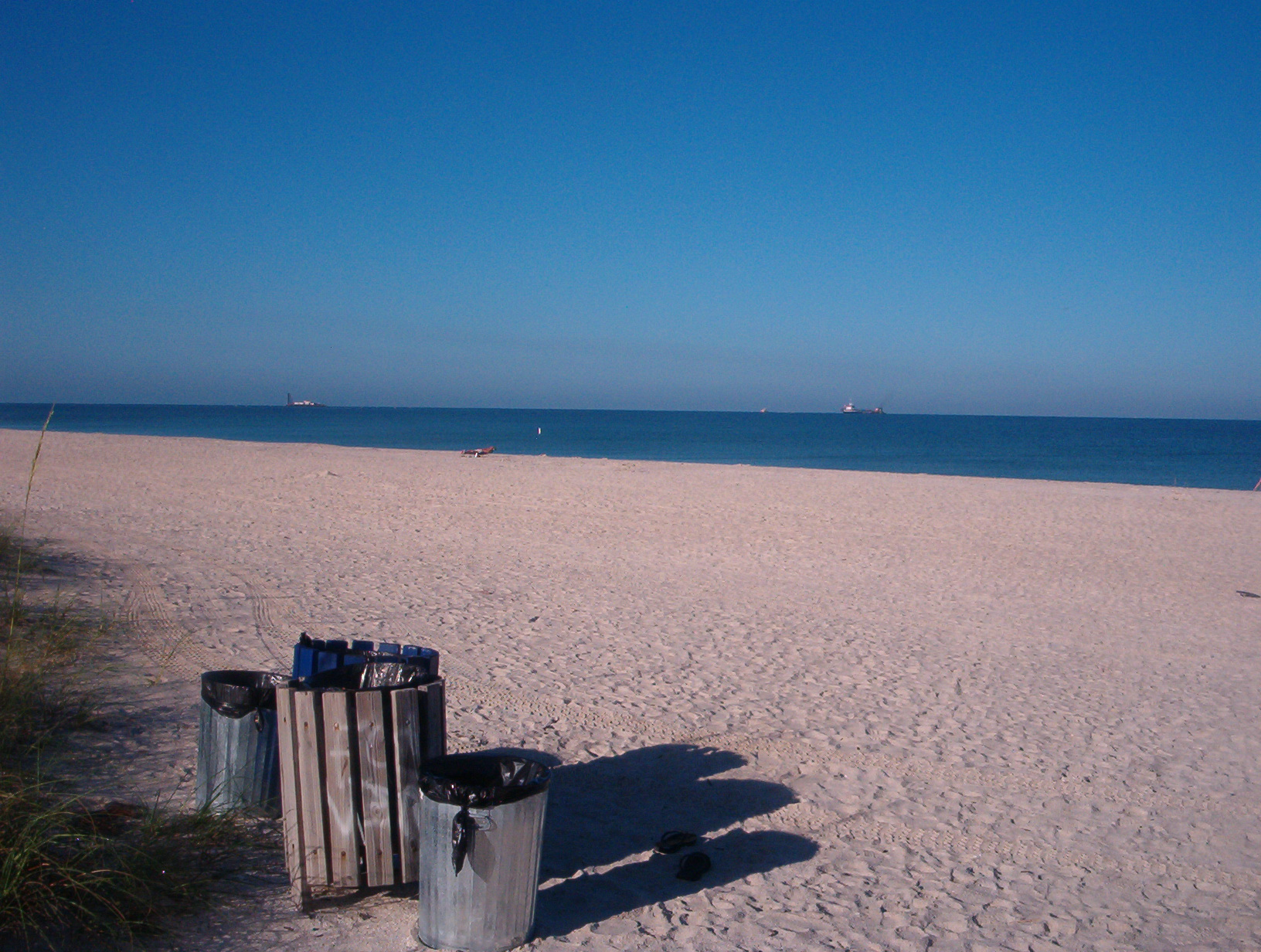
View from Nokomis Beach, outside the Nokomis CDP, early on a summer morning

Nokomis is an unincorporated town in Sarasota County and a census-designated place (CDP) along the Gulf Coast of Florida, United States, located south of Osprey and just north of Venice. The town has access to the coast through Nokomis Public Beach and Casey Key. The town's population was 3,217 at the 2020 census, up from 3,167 at the 2010 census. It is part of the Sarasota metropolitan area.

== History ==
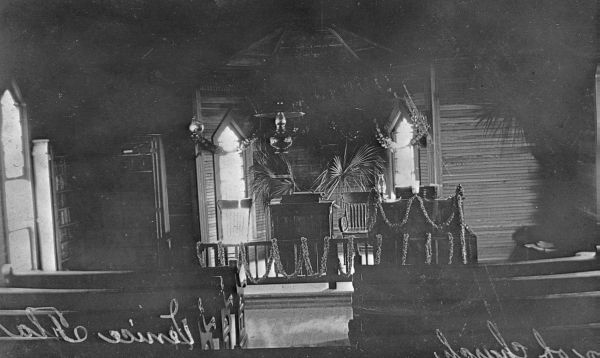
Interior of the Knight Chapel, which was destroyed by the 1926 Hurricane.

The first white settlers in what is now known as Nokomis were the Knights and at least 3 other families who moved to the area in 1868. The Knights had initially raised cattle further inland during the American Civil War in an effort to avoid raids by the Union army. Following the end of hostilities, they moved closer to the shore, in the hopes that the climate of the coastal areas were better for their health. The area was initially called Horse and Chaise, which included modern day Venice. Knight donated the land for the first school and also helped build the first chapel.

In 1917, Alfred F. Wrede established the first post office with the name of Nokomis southwest of the original Venice post office. The same year, orthopedic surgeon Dr. Fred Albee purchased 112 acres from the Sarasota-Venice Company. With Ellis W. Nash, Albee created the Nokomis subdivision by subdividing the property into 130 lots, with streets radiating from two inner avenue circles and the new asphalt highway, which eventually became U.S. 41. On U.S. 41, Albee and investors built the Pollyanna Inn, a 35-room hotel.

The Florida guide, compiled in the late 1930s and first published in 1939, listed Nokomis's population as 79 and described it as "a suburb of Venice, […] separated from that town by Shackett Creek…"

== Geography ==
According to the United States Census Bureau, the Nokomis Census Designated Place (CDP) has a total area of 1.9 square miles (5.0 km^{2}), of which 1.6 square miles (4.2 km^{2}) is land and 0.31 square miles (0.8 km^{2}), or 15.65%, is water.

Nokomis includes approximately 2.5 miles of the Legacy Trail, including a water crossing at the Shakett Creek (Dona Bay) bridge.

Casey Key is a barrier island to the northwest of the CDP along the Gulf of Mexico, where there are luxurious beachfront houses lining the key. Casey Key is not part of any CDP.

== Demographics ==
Historical population
Census	Pop.	Note	%±
1990	2,286		—
2000	2,253		−1.4%
2010	3,167		40.6%
2020	3,217		1.6%
U.S. Decennial Census

=== 2020 census ===
As of the 2020 census, Nokomis had a population of 3,217. The median age was 54.4 years. 14.5% of residents were under the age of 18 and 28.5% of residents were 65 years of age or older. For every 100 females there were 105.7 males, and for every 100 females age 18 and over there were 100.5 males age 18 and over.

100.0% of residents lived in urban areas, while 0.0% lived in rural areas.

There were 1,541 households in Nokomis, of which 15.5% had children under the age of 18 living in them. Of all households, 37.7% were married-couple households, 26.3% were households with a male householder and no spouse or partner present, and 26.3% were households with a female householder and no spouse or partner present. About 35.6% of all households were made up of individuals and 16.7% had someone living alone who was 65 years of age or older.

There were 1,837 housing units, of which 16.1% were vacant. The homeowner vacancy rate was 0.7% and the rental vacancy rate was 7.9%.

Racial composition as of the 2020 census
Race	Number	Percent
White	2,875	89.4%
Black or African American	17	0.5%
American Indian and Alaska Native	20	0.6%
Asian	38	1.2%
Native Hawaiian and Other Pacific Islander	3	0.1%
Some other race	51	1.6%
Two or more races	213	6.6%
Hispanic or Latino (of any race)	185	5.8%

=== 2000 census ===
As of the census of 2000, there were 3,334 people, 1,544 households, and 955 families residing in the CDP. The population density was 1,998.5 inhabitants per square mile (771.6/km^{2}). There were 1,820 housing units at an average density of 1,091.0 per square mile (421.2/km^{2}). The racial makeup of the CDP was 97.69% White, 0.60% African American, 0.24% Native American, 0.30% Asian, 0.27% from other races, and 0.90% from two or more races. Hispanic or Latino of any race were 1.86% of the population.

There were 1,544 households, out of which 19.8% had children under the age of 18 living with them, 49.8% were married couples living together, 8.0% had a female householder with no husband present, and 38.1% were non-families. 30.2% of all households were made up of individuals, and 13.7% had someone living alone who was 65 years of age or older. The average household size was 2.15 and the average family size was 2.64.

In the CDP, the population was spread out, with 17.1% under the age of 18, 5.3% from 18 to 24, 25.5% from 25 to 44, 28.3% from 45 to 64, and 23.8% who were 65 years of age or older. The median age was 46 years. For every 100 females, there were 100.6 males. For every 100 females age 18 and over, there were 97.4 males.

The median income for a household in the CDP was $34,699, and the median income for a family was $37,731. Males had a median income of $27,209 versus $21,563 for females. The per capita income for the CDP was $22,077. About 8.6% of families and 12.9% of the population were below the poverty line, including 13.4% of those under age 18 and 10.6% of those age 65 or over.
