= Venetian Waterway Park =

Coordinates: 27.1029°N 82.4446°W

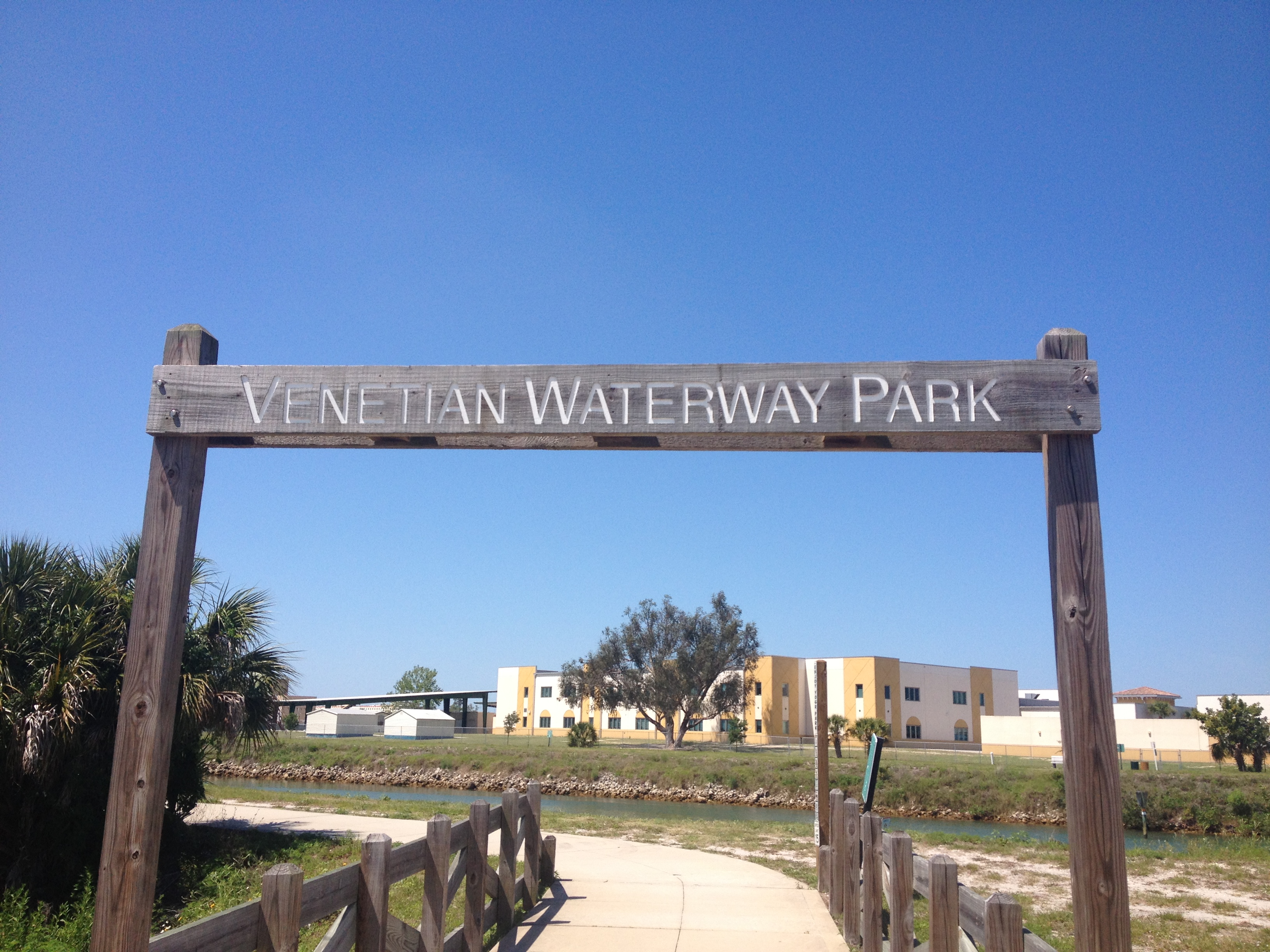
- Length: 9.3 miles (15.0 km)
- Location: Venice, Florida, United States
- Trailheads: Island: Venice Area Beautification Inc. Caspersen Beach; Mainland: Venice Avenue Bridge; Shamrock Park & Nature Center
- Use: Cycling, walking, hiking, jogging
- Season: Year round
- Sights: Venice Inlet
- Hazards: Close to ICW, Crossing Minor Roads, Crossing Bridges with Vehicular Traffic
- Surface: Concrete
- Website: Venetian Waterway Park

The Venetian Waterway Park is a 9.3-mile (15.0 km) concrete trail in Sarasota County, Florida located in Venice. It was a public–private partnership between Venice Area Beautification Inc. (VABI), Sarasota County, and the city of Venice. It consists of two trails paralleling the Intracoastal Waterway (ICW) from Downtown Venice to the Gulf of Mexico, with one on the island side of the waterway, and one on the mainland side. The two portions are connected by the Venice Avenue Bridge and the Circus Bridge.

== Route description ==
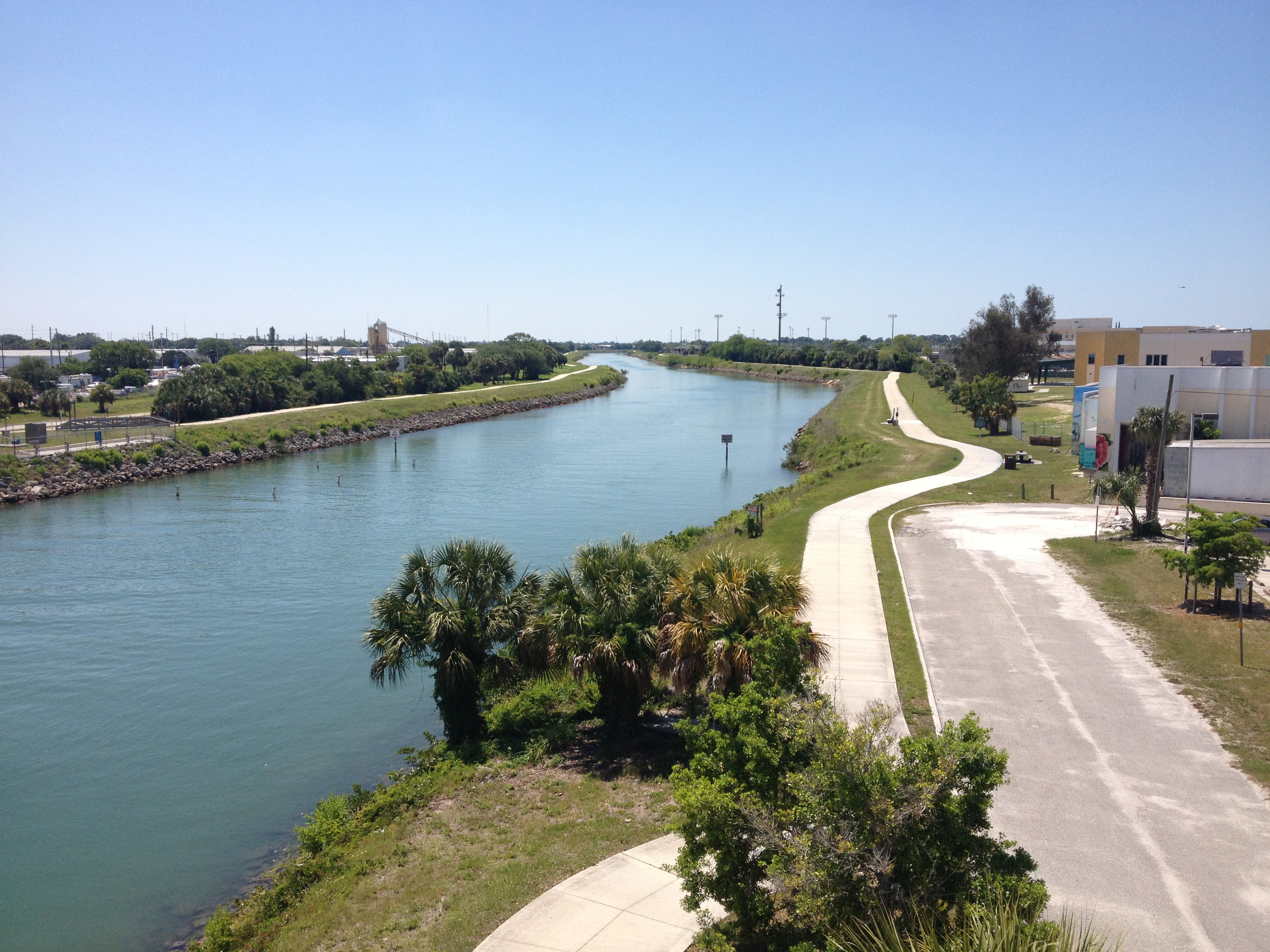
View of park from Venice Avenue Bridge

=== Island ===
The north end of the Island section of the Venetian Waterway Park is at the Venice Area Beautification Inc. (VABI) building. From there, it travels north under U.S. 41 Business and heading southbound toward East Venice Avenue. It continues to head south following the Intracoastal Waterway toward Venice High School where it turns west following the perimeter of their baseball field. It then heads north, then west, then south bordering Venice High's campus. Next, it heads southeast acting as a widened sidewalk on Golf Drive, then taking a right turn heading northwest away from Golf Drive and once again following the ICW before taking a left turn heading west through some pine trees. Next, it heads south before acting as yet another widened sidewalk on US 41 BUS heading Southeast. Next, it heads south undertaking the Circus Bridge (US 41 Business's south crossing) parallel to the ICW. It continues to parallel the ICW heading south until it heads west, crossing over small waterways until it reaches the southern trailhead at Caspersen Beach.

=== Mainland ===
The north end of the Mainland section of the Venetian Waterway Park is at East Venice Avenue, under the ICW bridge (This point is also the southern trailhead of the Legacy Trail). It heads south following the ICW and underpasses the Circus Bridge. From there it continues to head south parallel to the ICW all the way until ends at its southern trailhead in the Shamrock Park & Nature Center.
