= Legacy Trail (Florida) =

Multi-use recreational trail in Sarasota County, Florida

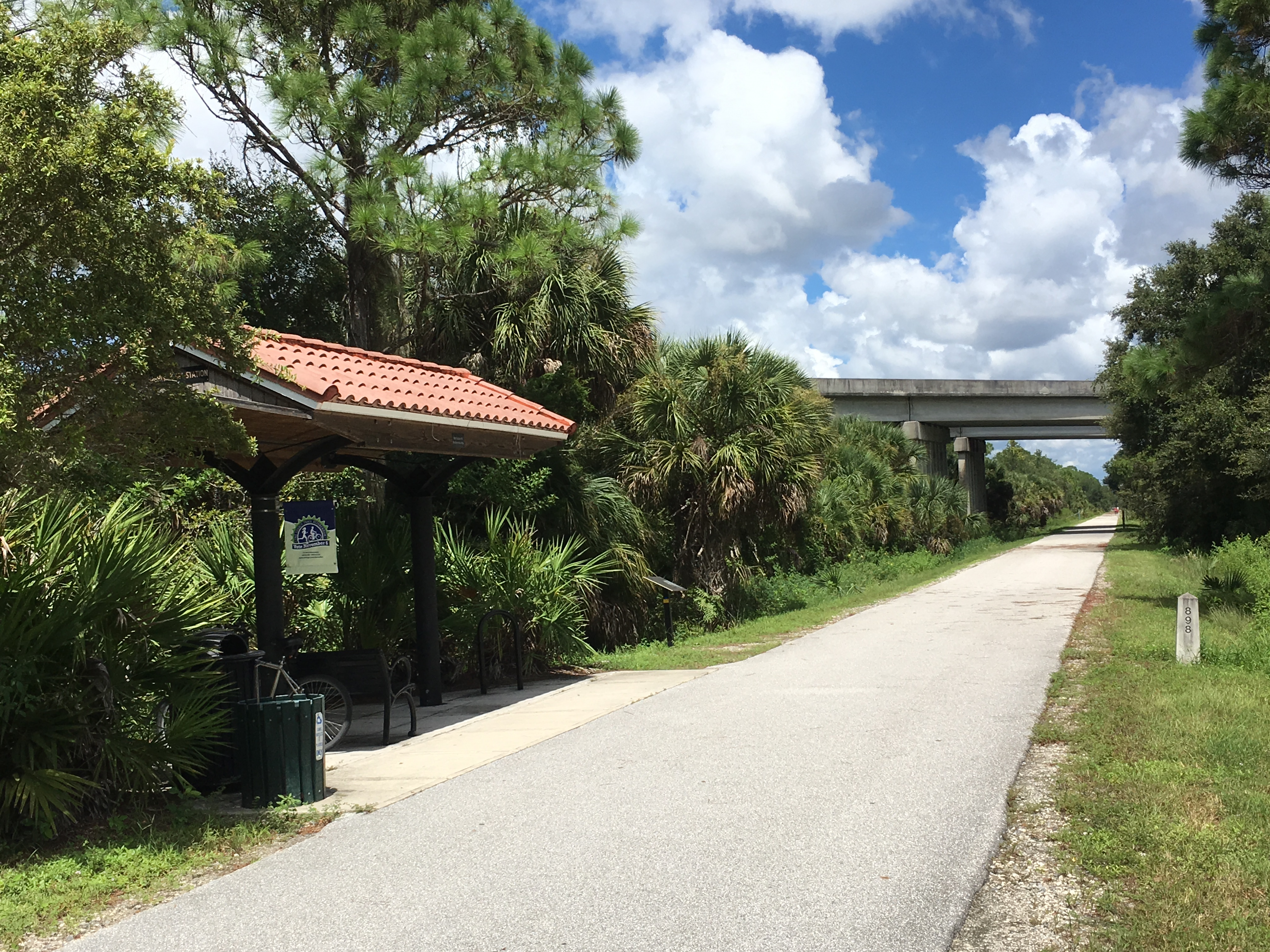
- Legacy Trail near State Road 681 overpass
- Length: 18.5 miles (29.8 km)
- Location: Sarasota County, Florida
- Established: December 21, 2004
- Trailheads: Payne Park; Pompano Trailhead; Sarasota Springs; Ashton Trailhead; Culverhouse Nature Park; Osprey Junction Trailhead; Laurel Park; Nokomis Community Park; Oscar Scherer State Park; Patriots Park; Historic Venice Train Depot
- Use: Shared-use for walking and cycling
- Season: Year round
- Months: Year round
- Sights: Payne Park, Oscar Scherer State Park, Venice Train Depot
- Hazards: Weather, at-grade pedestrian crossing at vehicular thoroughfares
- Surface: Asphalt
- Right of way: Seminole Gulf Railway
- Maintained by: Sarasota County
- Website: scgov.net/LegacyTrail

Trail map
- Legacy Trail highlighted in green

The Legacy Trail is an 18.5-mile (29.8 km) multi-use recreational rail trail connecting Sarasota and Venice, Florida. It runs along a former portion of the Seminole Gulf Railway corridor (most of which was originally part of the Seaboard Air Line Railroad corridor). The trail runs from the Historic Venice Train Depot to Fruitville Road in Sarasota. The original segment of the trail from Venice to Palmer Ranch opened in 2008 and it was extended to downtown Sarasota in 2022.

== Route description ==
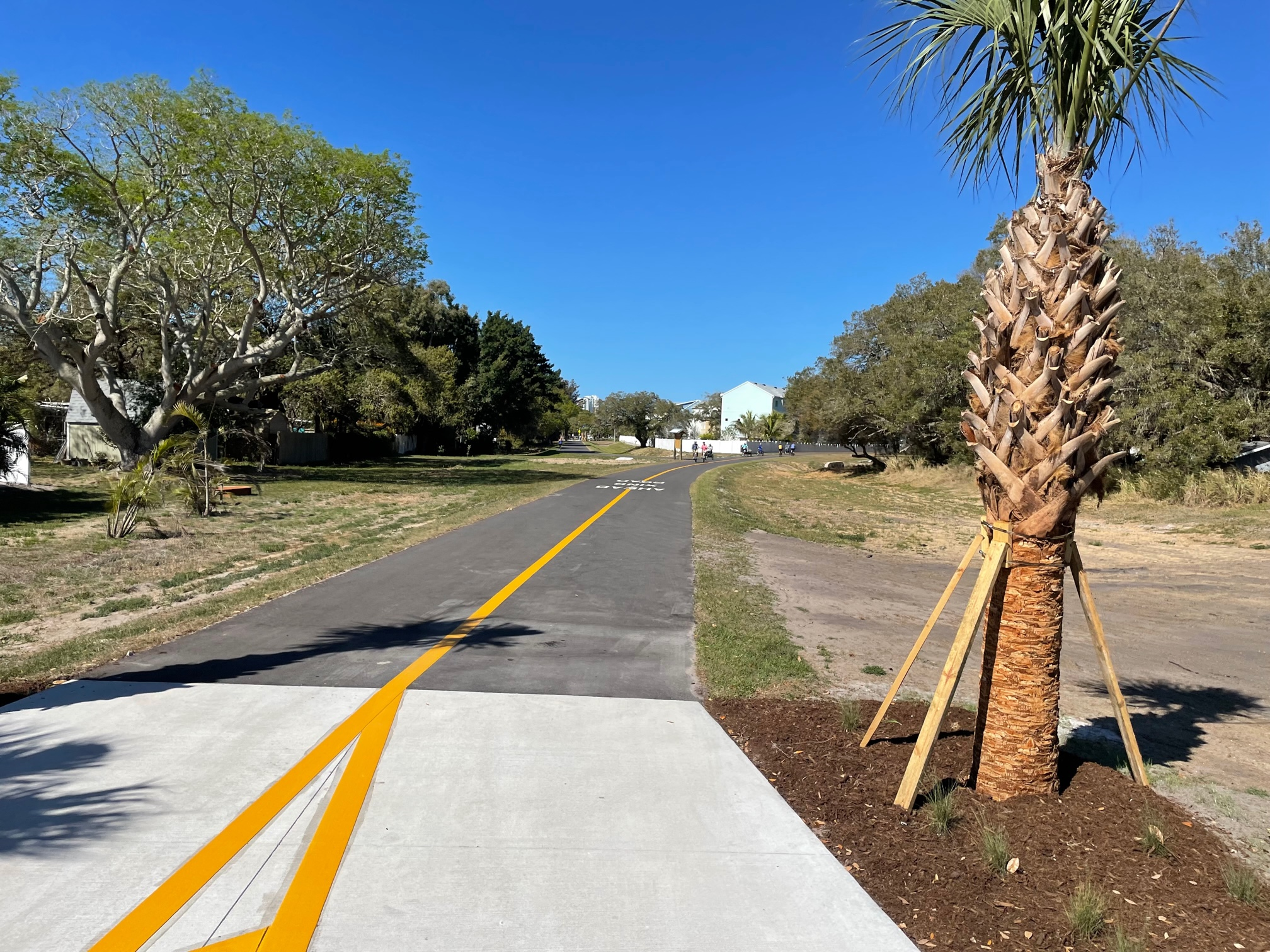
Legacy Trail at Shade Avenue in Sarasota where the spur to School Avenue splits from the main trail

The Legacy Trail begins in Venice at the Historic Venice Train Depot. At the depot, which now operates as a bus terminal for Breeze Transit, the trail connects to the Venetian Waterway Park (which runs south along the Intracoastal Waterway to the Gulf of Mexico).

From the Venice Depot, the trail runs north along the former rail corridor, crosses over the U.S. 41 Venice Bypass on an overpass, and enters Nokomis. North of Nokomis, it crosses Dona Bay and passes through Laurel. Another overpass carries the trail over Laurel Road.

North of Laurel, the trail passes underneath State Road 681 and runs through Oscar Scherer State Park, where it connects to the park's trails. It continues north through Osprey and passes Culverhouse Nature Park near Palmer Ranch.

The trail crosses over Clark Road just north of Palmer Ranch and continues north through Bee Ridge and Sarasota Springs.

The trail crosses Bahia Vista Street and Phillippi Creek before turning west toward downtown Sarasota. At Shade Avenue, the main trail turns north and passes Payne Park before terminating at Fruitville Road. Also at Shade Avenue, a short spur continues west to School Avenue, which connects to the Alderman Street Multi-Use Recreational Trail.

=== Historic elements ===
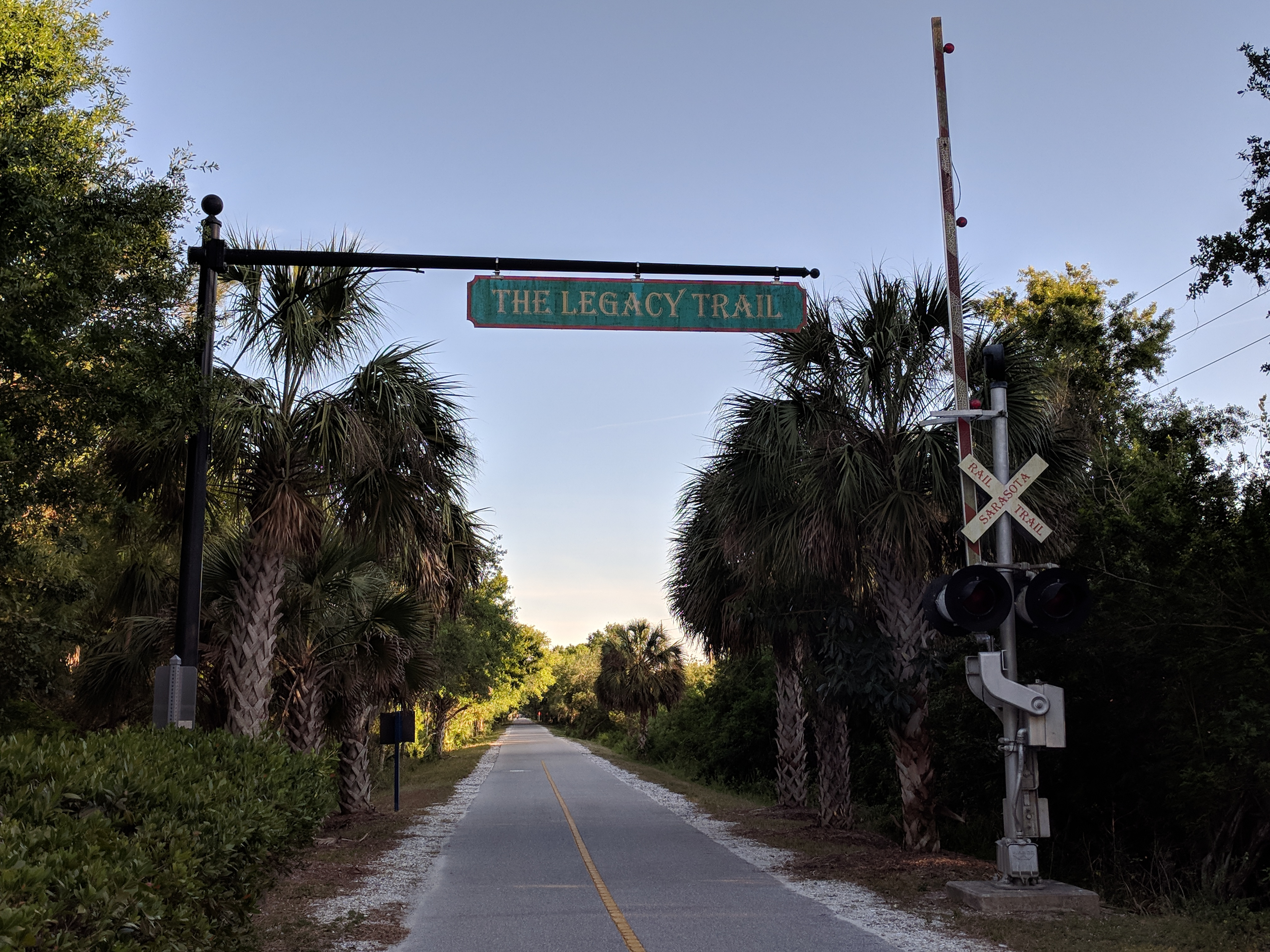
Decorative railroad crossing signal along the trail

The Legacy Trail references its past as the area's railroad corridor. The trail's milepost numbers (numbered 885–902) correspond to the railroad's original mile numbering. Original trestle bridge crossings remain at South Creek (near Oscar Scherer State Park), Phillippi Creek, and a creek near Beneva Road. Information plaques are placed along the trail detailing the history of the railroad corridor. Roadway crossings on the original segment include decorative railroad crossing signals with crossbucks reading Sarasota Rail Trail.

== North Port Connector ==
A separate trail connects the Legacy Trail to North Port in southern Sarasota County. The North Port Connector runs for 5.5 miles (8.9 km) and begins at Price Boulevard in North Port. It heads north through Deer Prairie Creek Preserve before turning west and paralleling Interstate 75 for over almost 4 miles (6.4 km). The North Port Connector ends at Forbes Trail, and trail users can use surface streets and roads (South Moon Drive, Border Road, Edmondson Road, and Florence Street) to access the main Legacy Trail. Florence Street connects to the main Legacy Trail at Nokomis Riverview Park.

== History ==
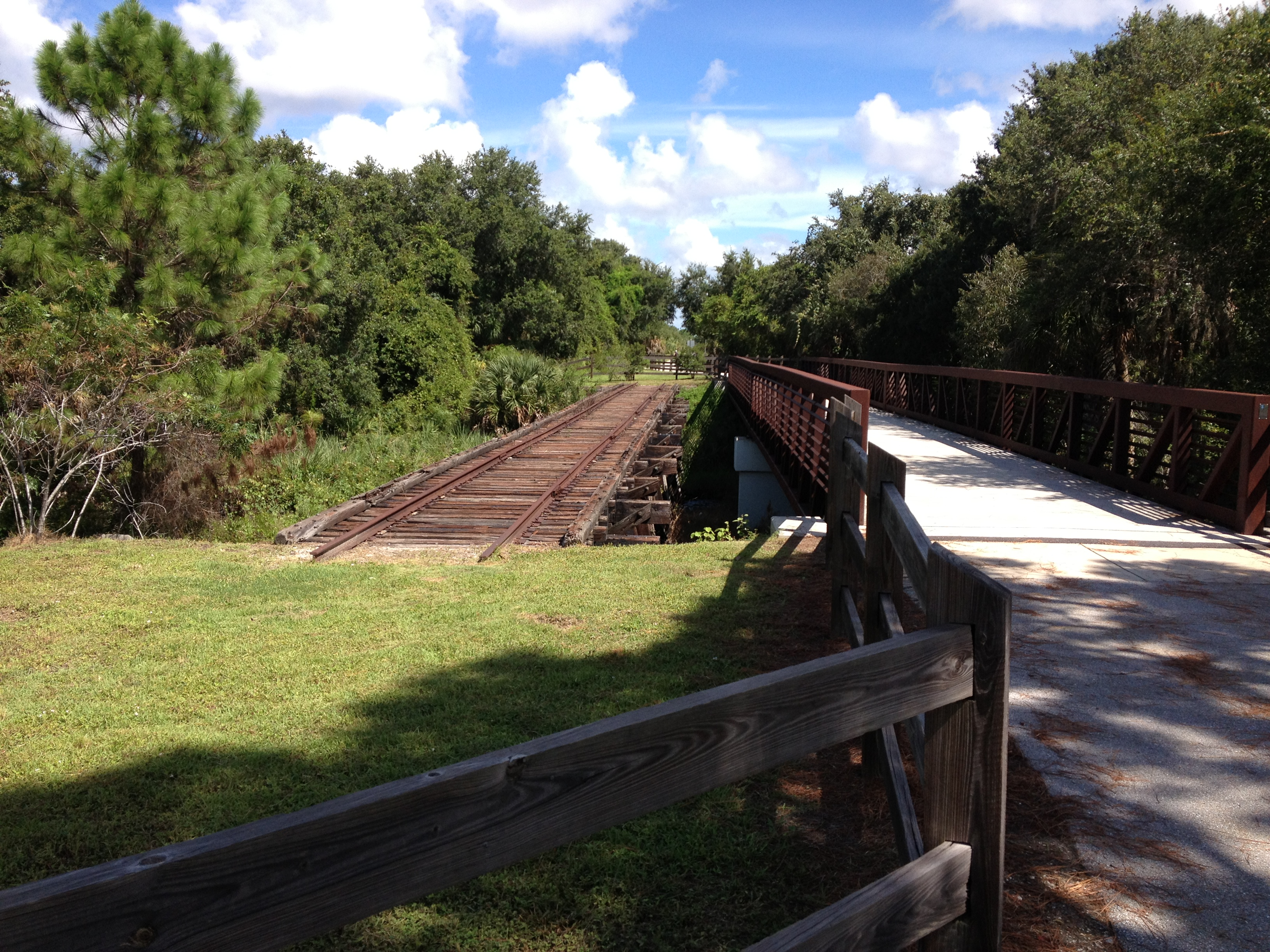
Portion of original rail trestle over South Creek along the trail near Oscar Scherer State Park

The railroad line from School Avenue (on the trail's spur) to a point near Beneva Road was initially built in 1903 by Seaboard Air Line Railroad (via their Florida West Shore Railway subsidiary) and was extended south from there to Venice in 1911. The track from Shade Avenue north to Fruitville Road was built in 1927 by the Atlantic Coast Line Railroad (via its Tampa Southern Railroad subsidiary). The Atlantic Coast Line tracks ran directly beside the Seaboard Air Line tracks between Shade Avenue and Beneva Road before the former continued east out of the city. The two parallel railroad lines were consolidated onto the route the trail follows today in 1967 when the Atlantic Coast Line and Seaboard Air Line merged and became the Seaboard Coast Line Railroad (which later became part of CSX Transportation).

In Venice, the railroad line was integral to the city's history and benefited the city's economy. The railroad was used by cadets and faculty of the Kentucky Military Institute for winter classes from 1933 to 1970, transported patients to Fred H. Albee's Florida Medical Center from 1932 to 1942, transported goods and servicemen to Venice Army Air Field during World War II, and used by Ringling Bros. and Barnum & Bailey Circus, which was headquartered in Venice from 1959 to 1992. The circus was the last consistent service the rail line carried.

Owing to decreased demand for service and the heavily deteriorated condition of the tracks and bridges, CSX Transportation and Seminole Gulf Railway, who had been leasing the line from CSX since 1987, came to an agreement with Sarasota County to abandon the railroad line south of Palmer Ranch. In return, Sarasota County, in conjunction with The Trust for Public Land, purchased and acquired the right of way in December 2004 for $11.75 million, equivalent to about $18.65 million in 2024, to use as a public recreational trail. The original 10-mile (16 km) segment of Legacy Trail from Venice to Culverhouse Nature Park near Palmer Ranch opened to the public on March 28, 2008.

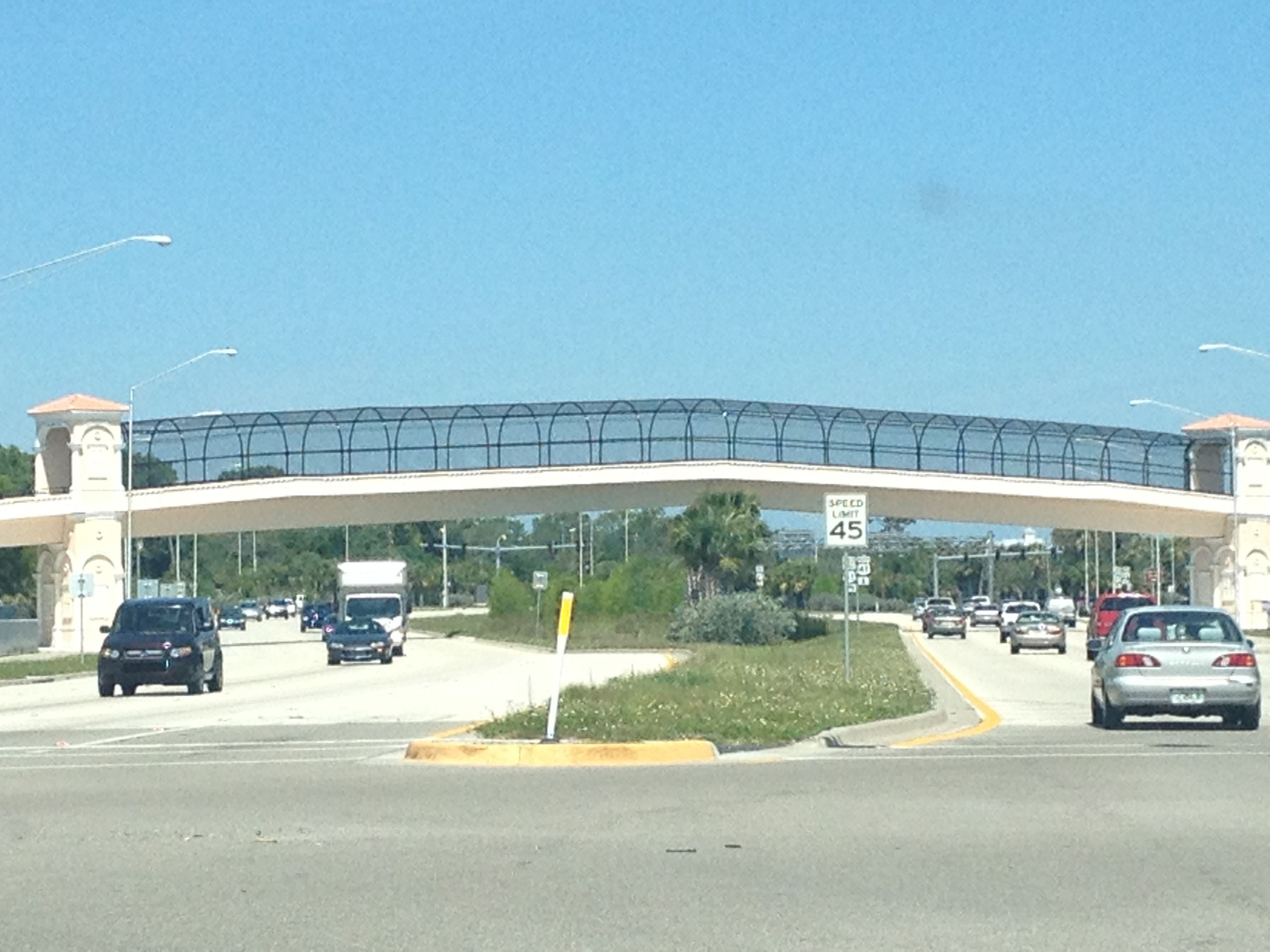
Overpass over U.S. 41 Bypass Route in Venice

In 2011, a pedestrian overpass was built to carry the trail over the U.S. 41 Venice Bypass. The $3.1 million overpass is 18 feet (5.5 m) tall, spans 900 feet (270 m), and was built with federal stimulus funding. Another pedestrian overpass constructed by FDOT over Laurel Road started construction in November 2017 and was completed in late 2018.

In early 2017, Seminole Gulf Railway and CSX announced their intention to abandon an additional 9 miles (14 km) of the remaining southern segment of the railroad up to a point just south of Fruitville Road. In December 2017, Sarasota County, in conjunction with The Trust for Public Land, purchased and acquired 2.7 miles (4.3 km) of the former railroad corridor right of way for $7.9 million, which extended the county's ownership of the corridor up to Ashton Road, approximately one-half mile (0.80 km) north of Clark Road.

In November 2018, Sarasota County voters approved a referendum to acquire and improve 6.3 miles (10.1 km) of the former railroad corridor, extending the trail and constructing the North Port Connector. By early 2020, Seminole Gulf removed tracks and signals from the corridor, and construction for the trail expansion started shortly after.

The first segments of the northern extension, which include the segment from the original trail at Culverhouse Nature Park to Sawyer Loop Road and the segment from Ashton Road to Bahia Vista Street, opened on July 8, 2021. The segment from Sawyer Loop Road to Ashton Road opened on October 7, 2021. The final segment from Bahia Vista Street to Fruitville Road opened on March 3, 2022. The North Port Connector opened on September 9, 2022.

The Florida Department of Transportation built pedestrian overpasses for the trail at Clark Road and Bee Ridge Road. They were both completed in 2025.

The short connector linking the trail's spur at School Avenue to the Alderman Street Multi-Use Recreational Trail was built by the city of Sarasota in 2025.

== Future ==
The North Port Connector is planned to be extended south from Price Boulevard to Warm Mineral Springs, with completion planned for the 2030-31 fiscal year.

The Legacy Trail will also serve as part of the Florida Gulf Coast Trail, a 336-mile-long (541 km) corridor of trails connecting Tampa and Naples.

== Gallery ==
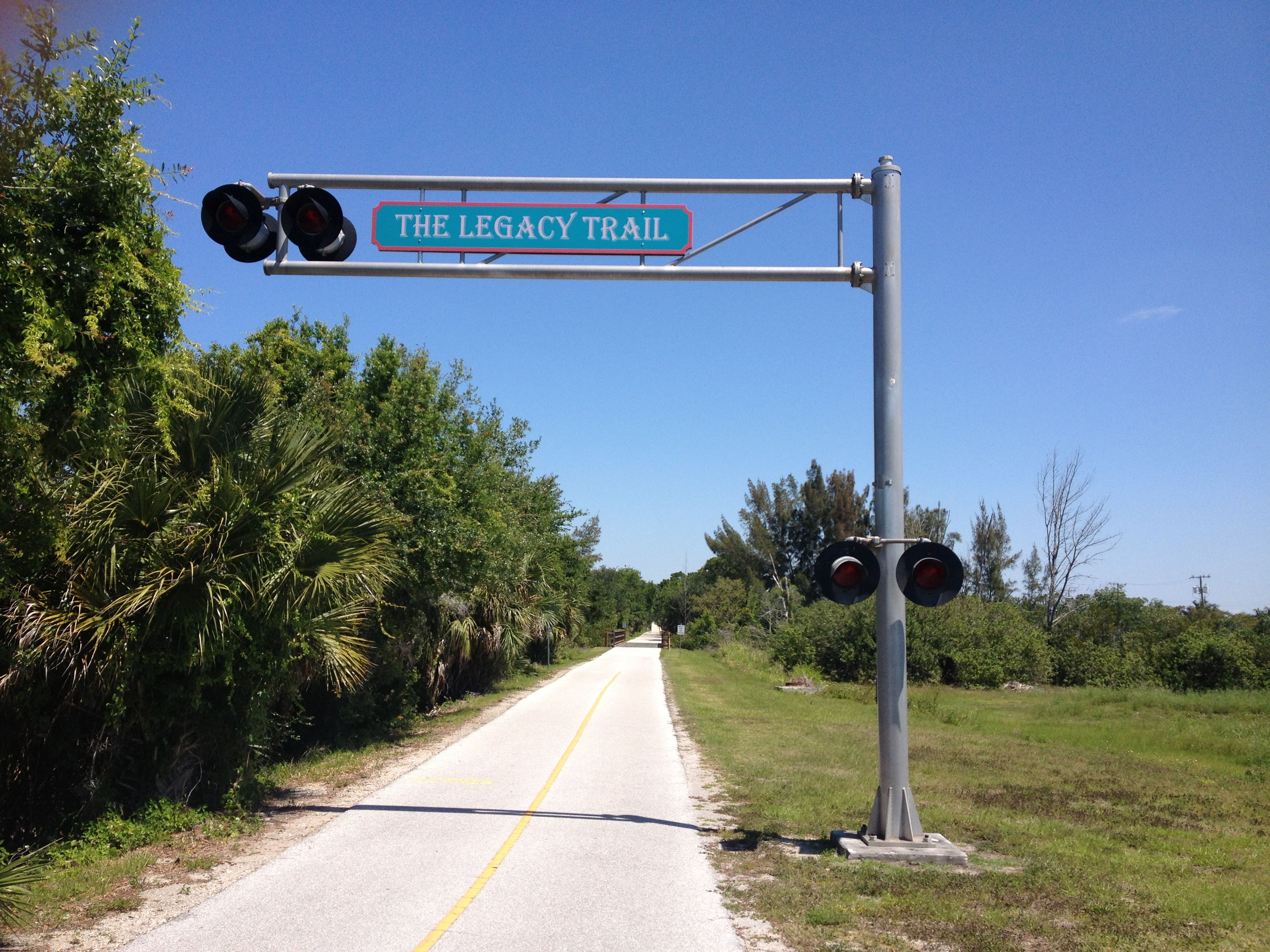
Southern terminus near Historic Venice Train Depot

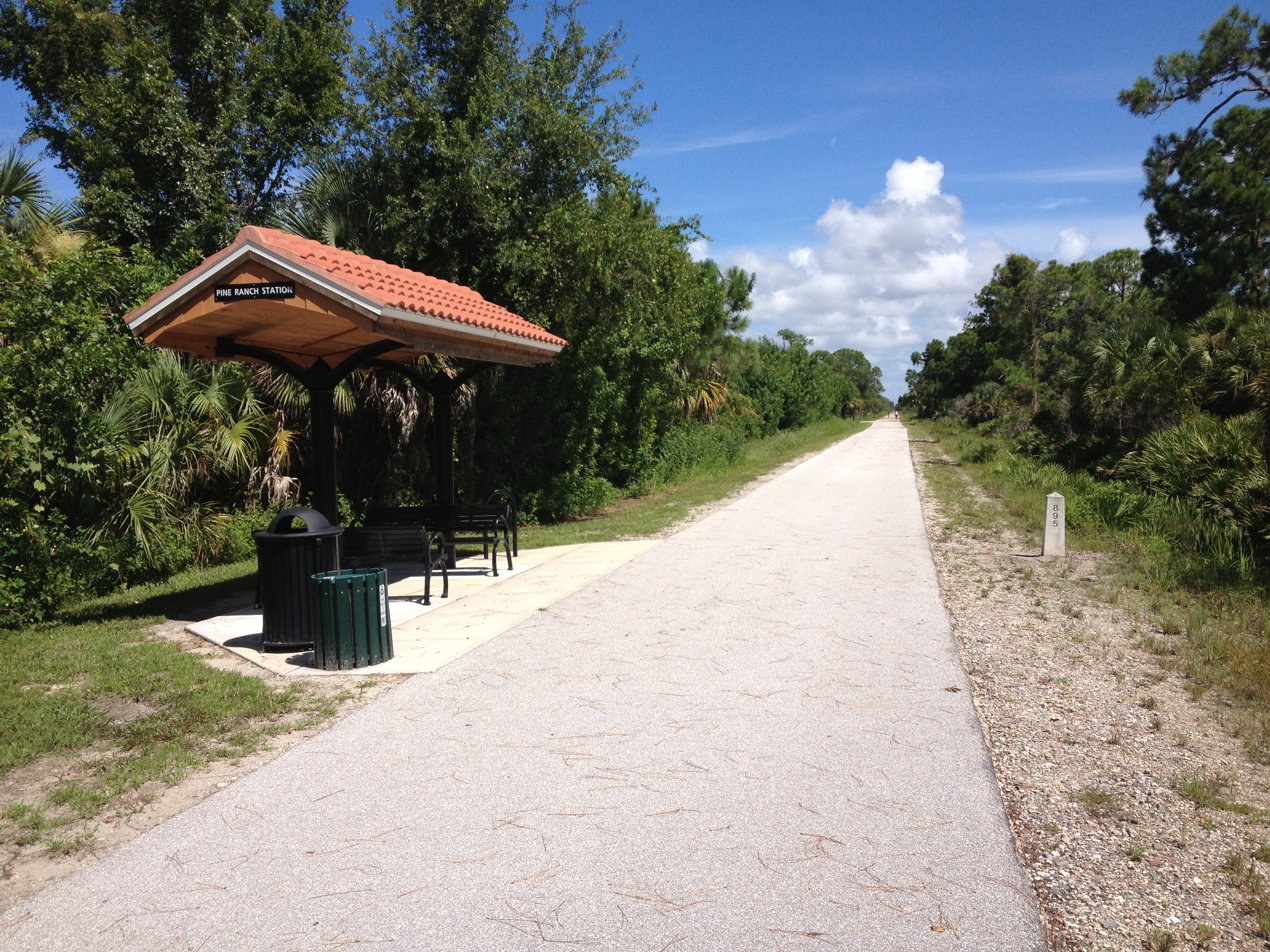
Covered benches called "stations" can be found throughout the trail every few miles

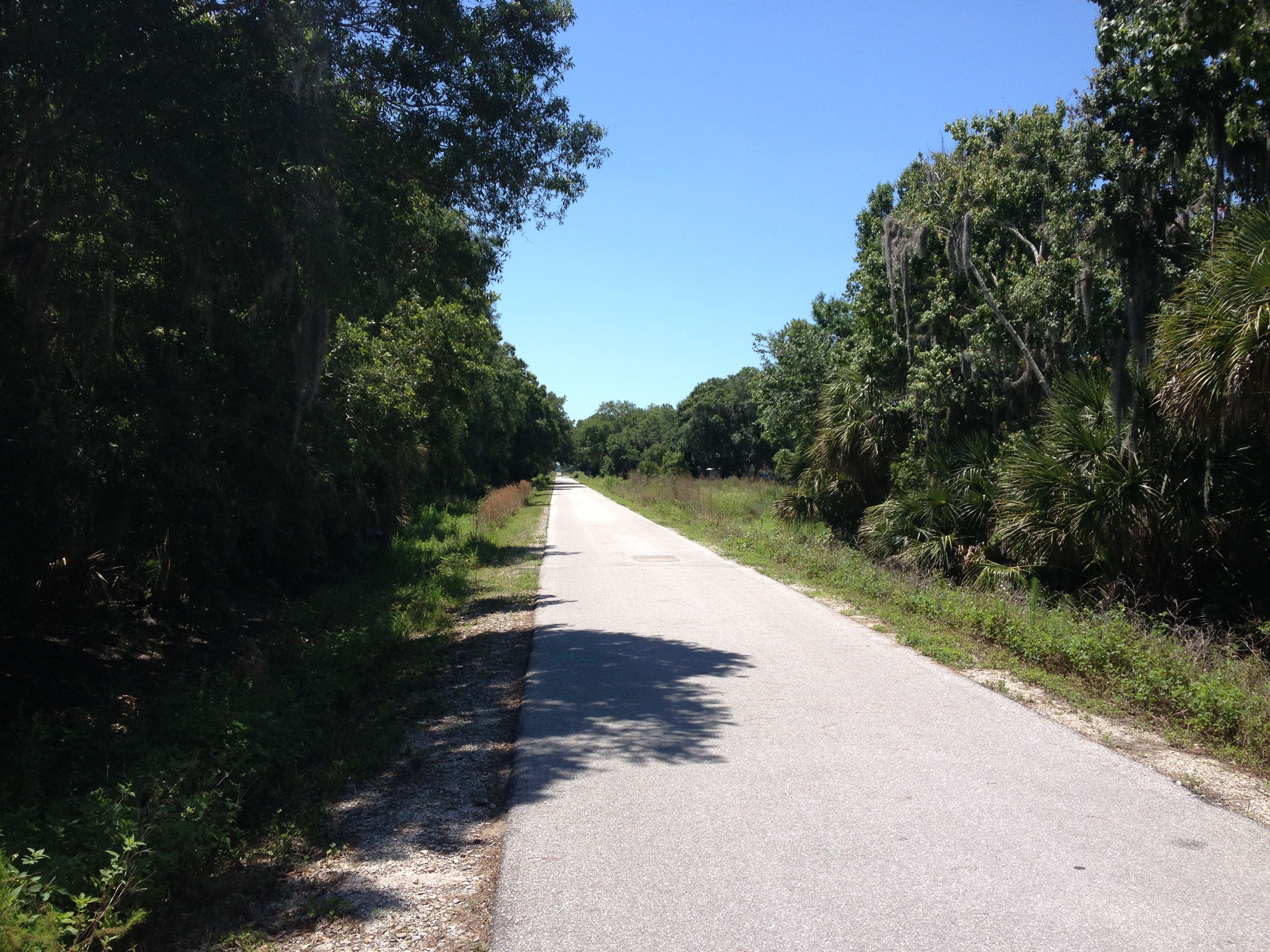
Legacy Trail near Nokomis

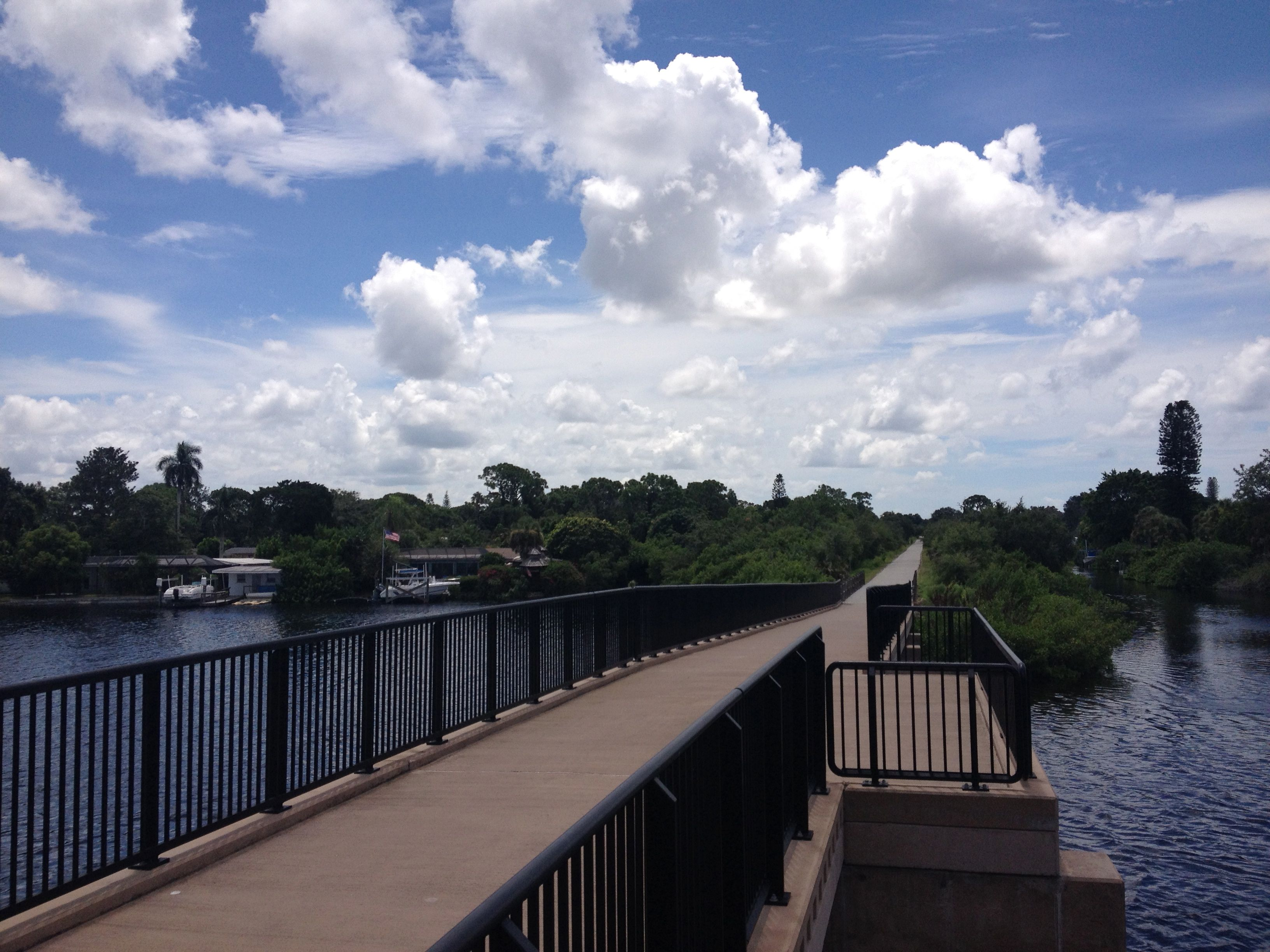
Bridge over Dona Bay
