= Fred H. Albee =

American surgeon who invented bone grafting

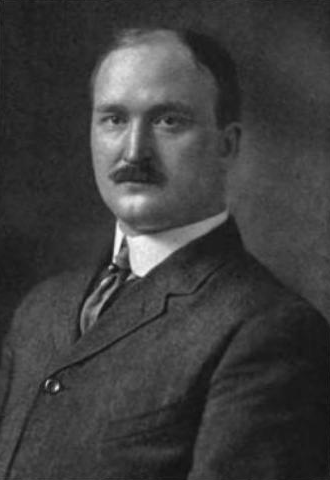
- Born: Frederick Houdlette Albee; April 13, 1876; Alna, Maine
- Died: February 15, 1945 (aged 68); New York, New York
- Education: Bowdoin College; Harvard Medical School
- Occupation: Surgeon
- Spouse: Louella May Berry (m. 1907)

Frederick Houdlette Albee (April 13, 1876 – February 15, 1945) was a surgeon who invented bone grafting and other advances in orthopedic surgery as a surgical treatment. He was also one of the fathers of rehabilitative medicine, a pioneer in physical, psychological and occupational rehabilitation. As a result of his discoveries, untold numbers of injured, crippled and disfigured persons were able to overcome trauma that had previously been untreatable.

== Biography ==
=== Early life and education ===
Albee was born on a farm in the township of Alna, Maine, on a Friday the 13th, and learned how to do tree grafting from his uncle, Charles Houdlette. He later applied the principles of grafting, and guarding a tree from outside disruptions, to his bone grafting operations. Though he was a hard worker on the farm, he was fascinated by medicine. When he was 16, Albee was sent to the Lincoln Academy in Newcastle, Maine, and furthered his education. He worked his way through Bowdoin College, where he was a member of Kappa Sigma fraternity, and got a job as a laboratory assistant to Bowdoin's professor of bacteriology. He also worked hard to get one of the two scholarships offered by the Harvard University School of Medicine.

At Harvard, Albee assisted Dr. Richard Cabot in the study of the measurement of blood pressure, and in his fourth year, Albee was one of the few medical students chosen to be a prosector, which gave him the privilege of assisting Dr. Maurice Richardson, the professor of surgery, during operations. Upon obtaining his M.D., Dr. Albee interned at Massachusetts General Hospital. After a brief general practice, he became an assistant orthopedic surgeon at the New York Postgraduate Medical School Clinic. When Dr. Charles Ogilvy retired, Dr. Albee became the chief surgeon.

He married Louella May Berry on February 2, 1907.

=== Career ===
In 1906, Dr. Albee performed his first successful bone-grafting operation, reducing hip pain for a rheumatism sufferer. The results attracted such wide attention that other surgeons soon consulted with Dr. Albee to duplicate the results. In 1911, Dr. Albee discovered a method for using bone instead of metal to perform a spinal fusion for infected vertebrae. He perfected his techniques including the classification of bone types, and in 1912, invented the "Albee Bone Mill", a power driven machine that reduced the time needed for a bone graft to as little as ten minutes. As a result, he was able to restore mobility to children in England who had been crippled by tuberculosis and other bone illnesses.

Dr. Albee's pioneering discoveries in medicine came just before the First World War. Prior to the development of Dr. Albee's methods, the primary treatment for a soldier's seriously fractured limb had been amputation because of the need to prevent the spread of infection. The German Orthopedic Surgical Congress had invited Albee to present his techniques in April 1914, and Dr. Albee worked in Allied military hospitals close to the Front, so his work prevented countless amputated limbs on both sides of the war. Dr. Albee's 1915 textbook, Bone Graft Surgery, came out as the War ended its second year.

At least 70 percent of war wounds in World War One were orthopedic injuries. Upon his return to the United States in 1917, Dr. Albee emphasized the need for immediate preparation for a medical emergency. With the cooperation of the War Department and the United States Surgeon General, William C. Gorgas, Dr. Albee was given free rein to open "United States Hospital Number 3", at Colonia, New Jersey, as the first purely orthopedic hospital. It was at that time that Dr. Albee implemented a program for physical, psychological and occupational rehabilitation of wounded soldiers. The United States government allocated the sum of $3,500,000 for the program to be operational by 1918. Dr. Albee would note later, "I was privileged to perform approximately half of all the bone-graft operations done in the First World War." Its post-war work done, the Colonia hospital closed in October 1919, and Dr. Albee turned his energies toward the peacetime treatment of injured workers. He lobbied for creation of the New Jersey Commission for Rehabilitation and served as its Chairman for 23 years. During the 1930s, he made frequent trips to South America to further the use of orthopedic and rehabilitation techniques.

He died in New York City on February 15, 1945.

== Published works ==
- Bone Graft Surgery (1915)
- Orthopedic and Reconstructional Surgery (1919)
- Orthopedic and reconstruction surgery, industrial and civilian
- Injuries and Diseases of the Hip (1937)
- Bone Graft Surgery in Disease, Injury, and Deformity (1940)
- A Surgeon's Fight to Rebuild Men: An Autobiography (1943)
