= Breeze Transit =

Public transit system in Sarasota, Florida

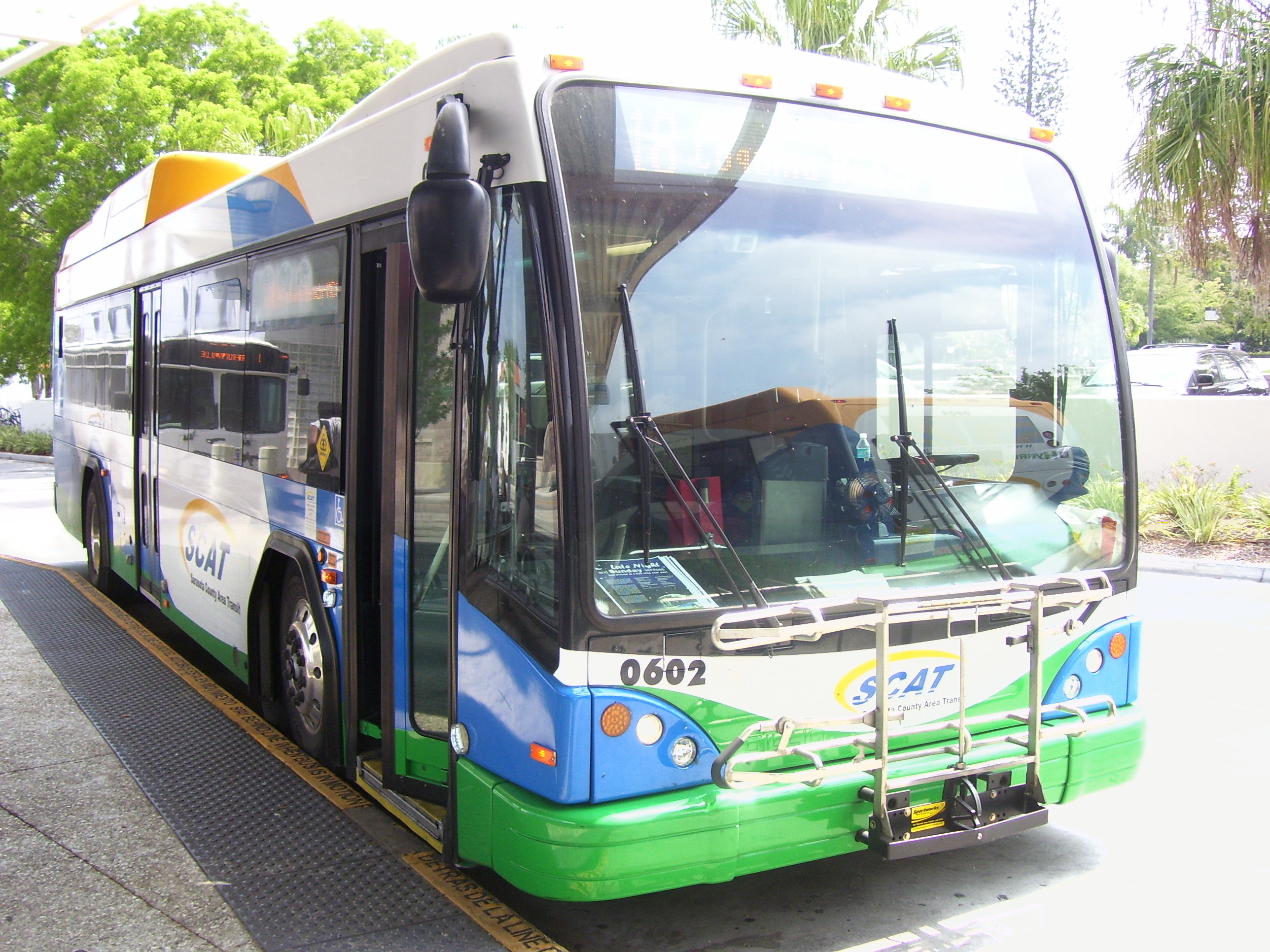

Overview
- Owner: Sarasota County, Florida
- Area served: Sarasota County
- Locale: Sarasota County
- Transit type: Bus, bus rapid transit
- Number of lines: 27
- Annual ridership: 2,081,328 (2022)
- Chief executive: Rocky Burke
- Headquarters: 5303 Pinkney Avenue; Sarasota, FL 34233
- Website: www.scgov.net/government/breeze-transit/breeze-routes

Operation
- Began operation: 1979; 47 years ago

Breeze Transit (previously Sarasota County Area Transit, or SCAT) provides public transportation for Sarasota County, Florida and is operated by the county. Breeze maintains 14 fixed-line bus routes, four curb-to-curb service zones, and a dial-a-ride paratransit service. The majority of the routes operate from Monday through Saturday, with select service on Sundays.

== Bus routes ==
Breeze operates 14 different local bus routes that serve the cities of Sarasota, Venice, North Port, the Town of Longboat Key, and other communities of Sarasota County. Additionally, service also extends into and is coordinated with Manatee County.

Breeze's paratransit service, delivered by private vendor Ride Right, provides trips to qualified people who cannot use the fixed-route service due to a disability or being transportation disadvantaged. Trips are door to door service to and from locations during the fixed route system's regular service hours. Americans with Disabilities Act (ADA) trips are provided in areas within a 3/4 mile (1.2 km) distance of the fixed route system. Transportation Disadvantaged trips are provided to those who cannot access the fixed routed due to income, disability, or age.

== Fleet ==
Breeze maintains a fleet of Gillig buses, including ten hybrid BRT buses that the agency purchased in 2006. Breeze also has a contingency fleet of Orion I and Orion V buses.

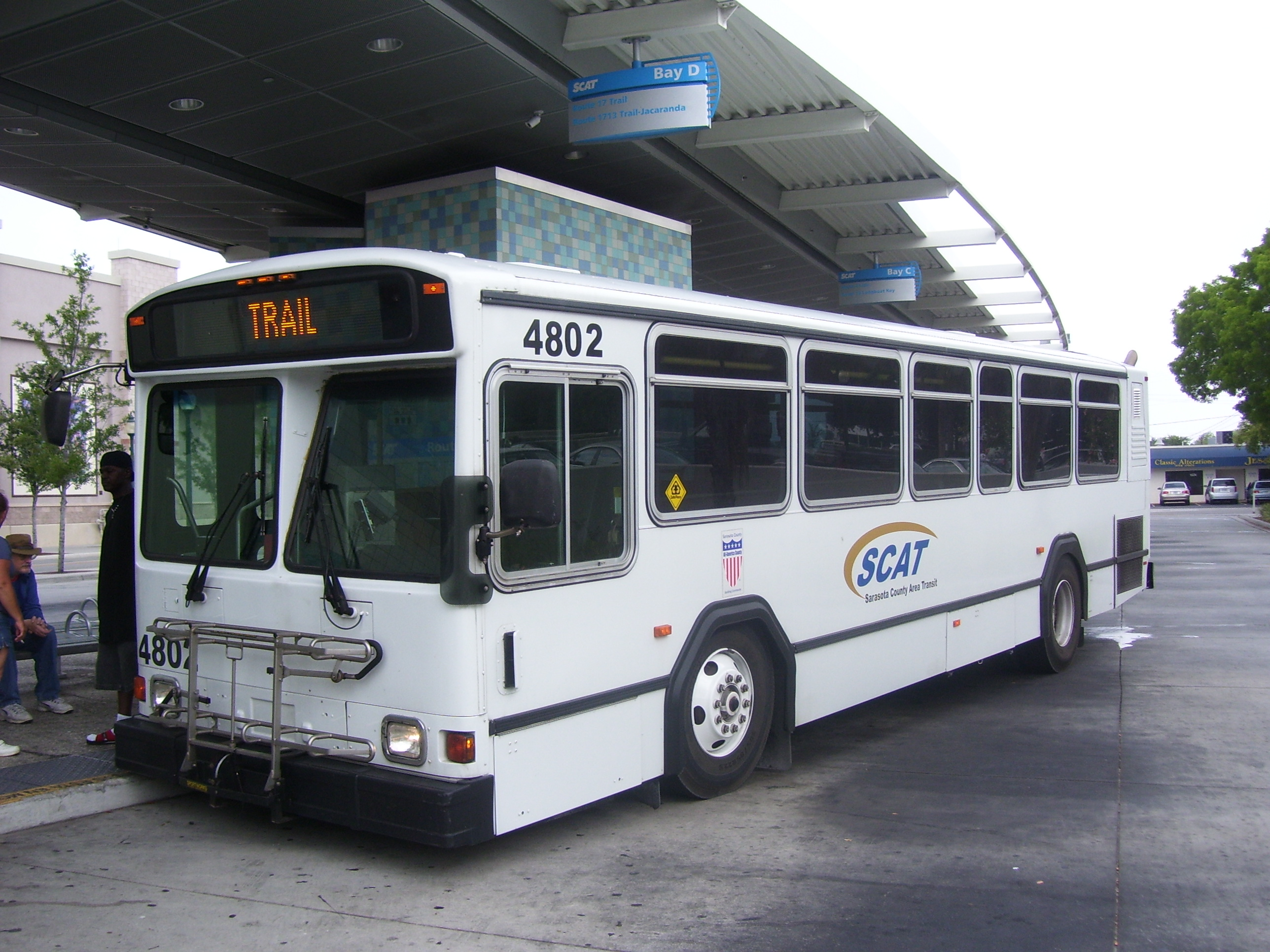
Gillig Phantom 35FT (retired)

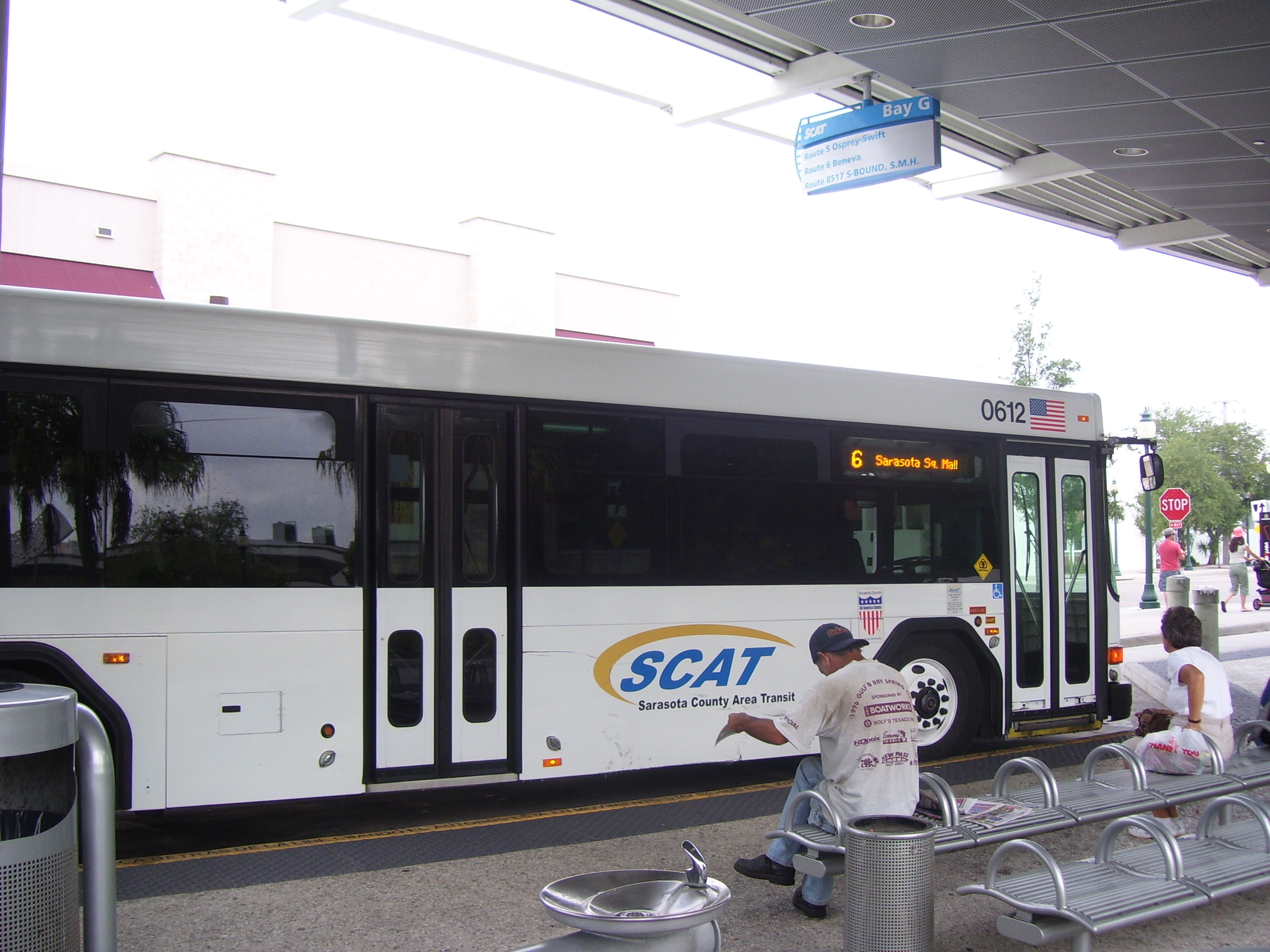
Gillig Low Floor 35ft

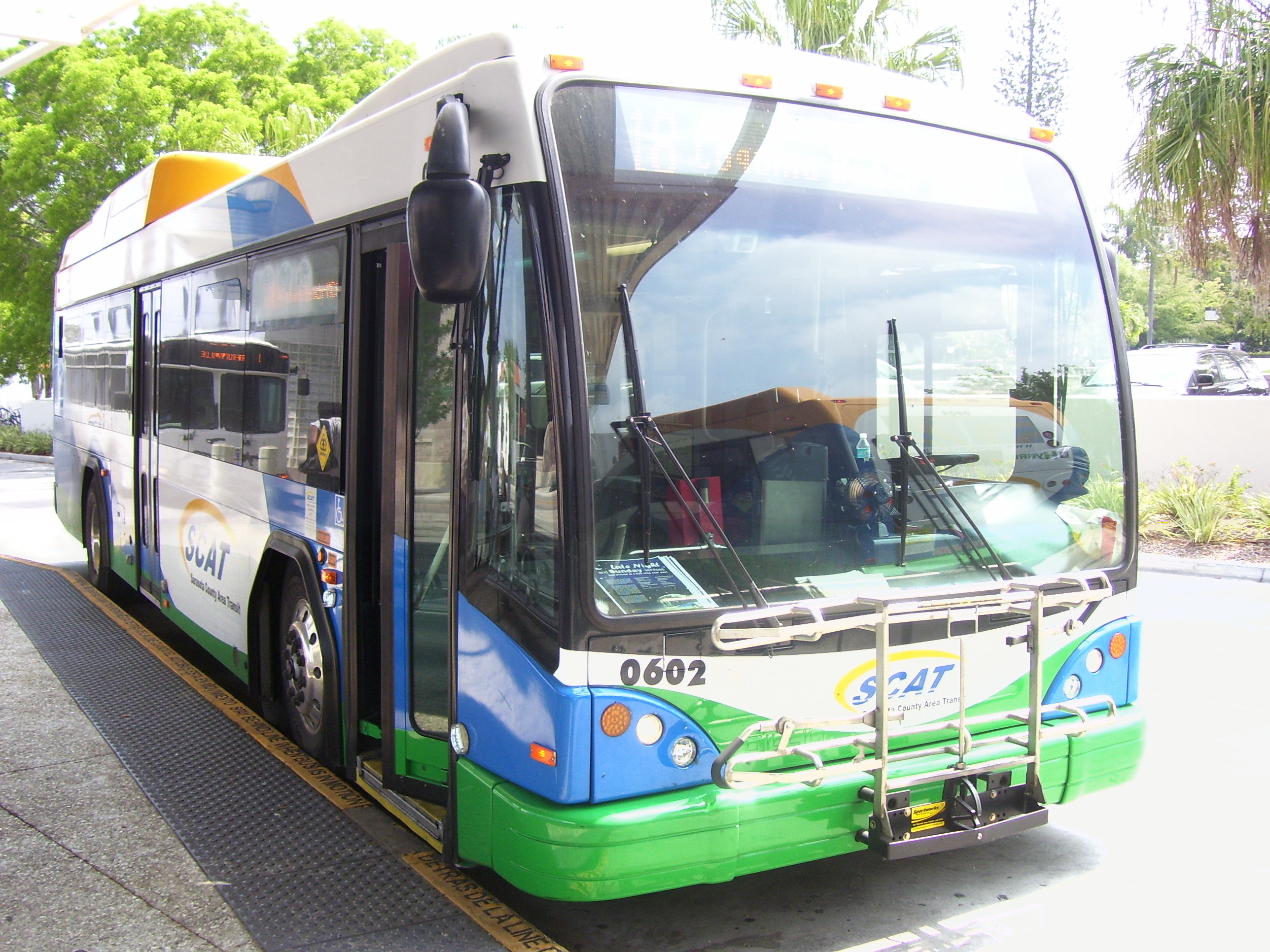
Gillig Hybrid BRT 35ft

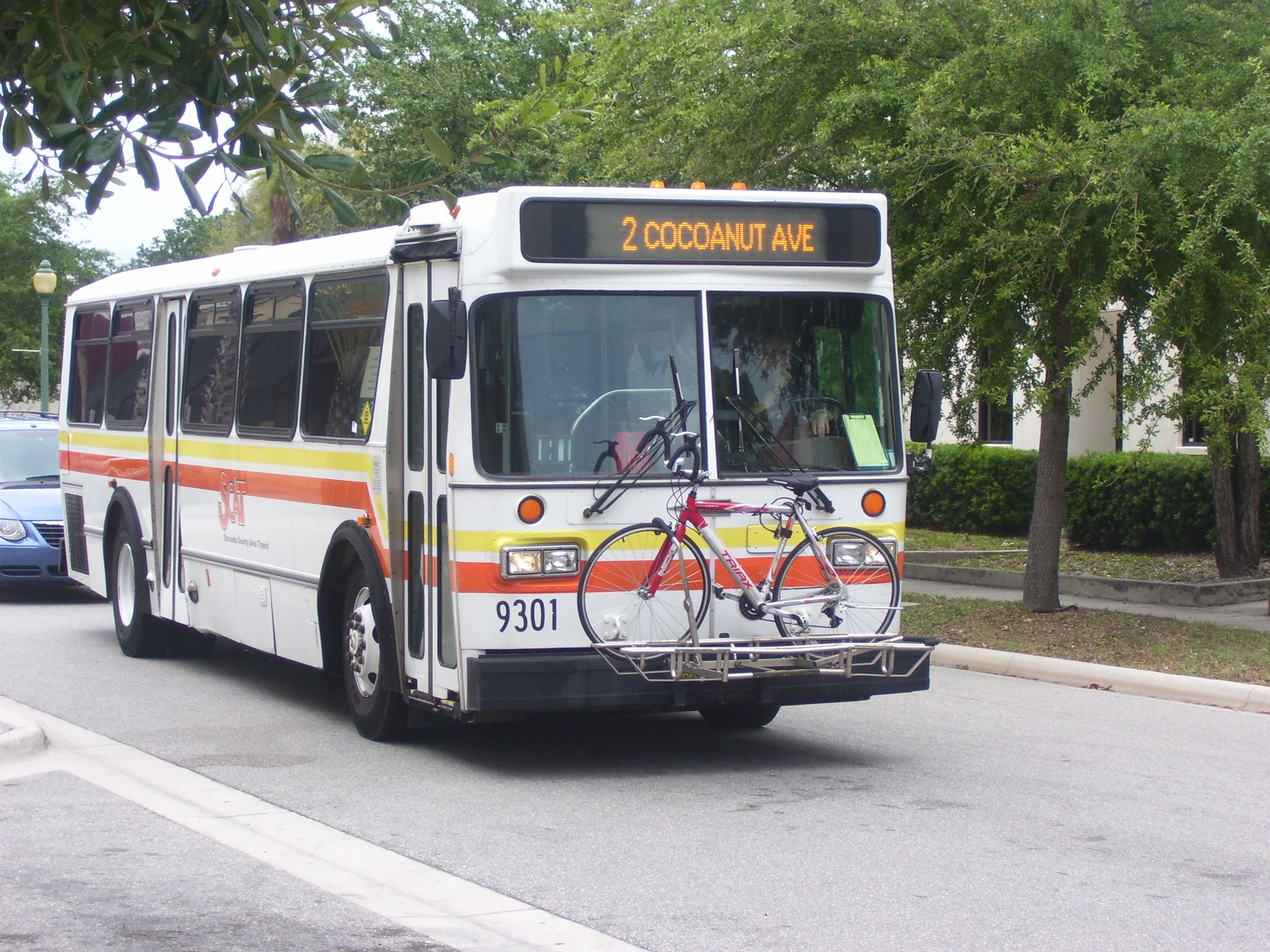
Orion I 35ft (retired)
