= Florida State Road 780 =

East–west street in Sarasota, Florida

State Road 780
- Fruitville Road
- SR 780 highlighted in red

Route information
- Maintained by Florida Department of Transportation
- Length: 5.636 mi (9.070 km)

Major junctions
- West end: US 301 in Sarasota
- East end: I-75 in Fruitville

Location
- Country: United States
- State: Florida
- Counties: Sarasota

Highway system
- Florida State Highway System; Interstate; US; State; Former; Pre‑1945; Toll; Scenic
← SR 777	SR 780	→ SR 786

State Road 780 (SR 780), known as Fruitville Road, is a 5-mile-long (8.0 km) east–west street in Sarasota, Florida. The western terminus is an intersection with US 301/SR 683 (Washington Boulevard). The eastern terminus is east of an interchange with Interstate 75 (SR 93) in Fruitville, where the road continues east as County Road 780 (CR 780). West of US 301, Fruitville Road extends one mile (1.6 km) west of the end of SR 780, ending at an intersection with the Tamiami Trail (US 41/SR 45) in Downtown Sarasota.

== Route description ==
SR 780 begins at an intersection with US 301/SR 683 in Sarasota, heading east on Fruitville Road, a four to six-lane divided highway, continuing onto County Road 780. West of US 301, Fruitville Road continues as an unnumbered four-lane divided highway under city control to an intersection with US 41/SR 45 in Downtown Sarasota.

From the western terminus, SR 780 heads through residential areas with some businesses, widening to six lanes and curving southeast before heading east again, intersecting School Avenue. The state road crosses the Seminole Gulf Railway and intersects North Lime Avenue. The road continues east through more residential and commercial areas, intersecting North Tuttle Avenue, North Lockwood Ridge Road, and CR 773 (Beneva Road). SR 780 leaves Sarasota for Fruitville and passes through more developed areas, intersecting McIntosh Road, Honore Avenue, and Cattlemen Road before coming to an interchange with I-75/SR 93. Past this interchange, SR 780 comes to its eastern terminus, with Fruitville Road continuing east as CR 780.

== History ==
SR 780 was first designated in 1945 during the 1945 Florida state road renumbering. Prior to the renumbering, it was designated SR 18. At its greatest extent, SR 780 ran from Longboat Key south and east through Sarasota to SR 70 at a point historically known as Parkton (between Edgeville and Pine Level). At this time, the west end of Fruitville Road (known then as Myakka Road) was at East Avenue and 1st Street in Sarasota. Here, SR 780 turned south on East Avenue for a block, then turned back west on Main Street through Downtown Sarasota to present-day Gulf Stream Avenue. At Gulf Stream Avenue, SR 780 turned west and crossed the John Ringling Causeway to St. Armands Key, then turned north to the northern end of Longboat Key.

In 1957, the Longboat Pass Bridge opened connecting SR 780 on Longboat Key to SR 684 on Anna Maria Island. Upon its completion, the north-south segments of SR 780 and SR 684 were redesignated SR 789, and SR 780 was truncated to St. Armands Circle.

US 41 (Tamiami Trail) was concurrent with SR 780 along Main Street through Downtown Sarasota between South Palm Avenue and Washington Boulevard until 1959, then US 41 was rerouted to the newly-built Bayfront Drive.

In the late 1980s, the west end of Fruitville Road was realigned and extended to US 301 (Washington Boulevard) at 3rd Street in Sarasota. SR 780 was then rerouted along this extension, bringing it to its current terminus at US 301. The city of Sarasota widened 3rd Street and renamed it Fruitville Road in 1990 to make the road continuous, though the city remained in control of this section. Main Street also came under city control after the realignment, and the John Ringling Causeway was redesignated as part of SR 789.

SR 780 previously continued eastward on Fruitville Road past Interstate 75, through Fordville, before zigzagging through Old Myakka before becoming Clay Gully Road at the northern boundary of Myakka River State Park. Three miles east of Sandy, Clay Gully Road turns northward at the boundary between Sarasota County and DeSoto County, where it reaches the historic eastern terminus of SR 780, an intersection with SR 70 three miles (4.8 km) southeast of Edgeville. The part of former SR 780 east of I-75 became CR 780 in the early 1980s, after Florida Department of Transportation designated it a secondary State Road (and applied an "S-" prefix to the State Road 780 designation a decade earlier). This was part of a large set of redesignations that transformed the map of the State of Florida.

== Major intersections ==
The entire route is in Sarasota County.

Location	mi	km	Destinations	Notes
Sarasota	0.000	0.000	US 301 (Washington Boulevard / SR 683) – Downtown Sarasota	Western terminus
Sarasota	2.078	3.344	CR 773 (Beneva Road)	
Fruitville	5.355	8.618	I-75 (SR 93) – Tampa, Naples	I-75 exit 210
Fruitville	5.636	9.070	east end of state maintenance	
1.000 mi = 1.609 km; 1.000 km = 0.621 mi
