= Florida State Road 789 =

State highway in Florida, United States

State Road 789
- SR 789 highlighted in red

Route information
- Maintained by FDOT
- Length: 17.616 mi (28.350 km)
- Tourist routes: Bradenton Beach Scenic Highway; Gulf Coast Heritage Trail

Major junctions
- South end: US 41 in Sarasota
- SR 684 in Bradenton Beach; City Route 789 in Holmes Beach
- North end: SR 64 in Holmes Beach

Location
- Country: United States
- State: Florida
- Counties: Sarasota, Manatee

Highway system
- Florida State Highway System; Interstate; US; State; Former; Pre‑1945; Toll; Scenic
← SR 786	→ SR 794

State Road 789 (SR 789) is a 17.5-mile-long (28.2 km) state road along Florida’s Gulf Coast that spans Bird Key, St. Armands Key, and Lido Key, in Sarasota; Longboat Key (as Gulf of Mexico Drive); and Anna Maria Island. The southern terminus is the intersection of the John Ringling Causeway and Tamiami Trail (US Highway 41, US 41) in Sarasota; the northern terminus is the intersection of Gulf Drive, North and Manatee Avenue., West (SR 64) in Holmes Beach. Much of the northernmost five miles (8.0 km) has been designated Bradenton Beach Scenic Highway.

Additional sights along SR 789 include Ken Thompson Park (featuring Mote Aquarium on City Island), and the scenery of Gulf of Mexico Drive as it travels the length of Longboat Key.

== Route description ==
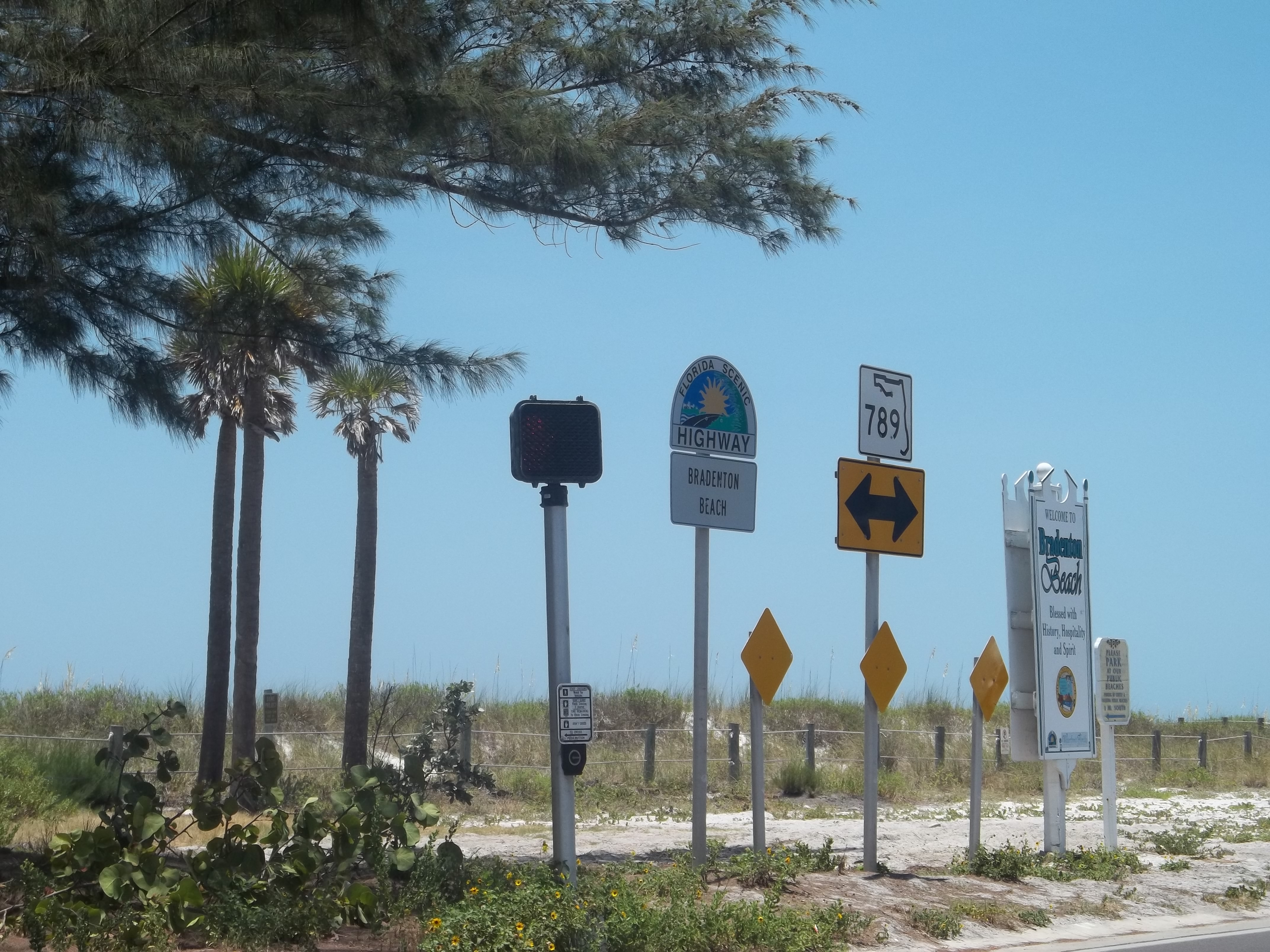
SR 789 in Bradenton Beach at western terminus of SR 684

SR 789 begins at an intersection with US 41 in Sarasota, Sarasota County, heading west on North Gulfstream Avenue, a four-lane divided highway. The road runs to the north of Sarasota Bay before passing through an area of high-rise residential buildings. The state road curves southwest and becomes the John Ringling Causeway, crossing over Sarasota Bay on the Ringling Bridge. SR 789 runs across the northern part residential Bird Key before crossing more of the bay and heading onto St. Armand's Key. At this point, the roadway becomes John Ringling Boulevard and heads into commercial areas. SR 789 reaches the St. Armand's Circle and turns northwest onto Boulevard of the Presidents. The road passes homes before crossing a channel and narrowing into two-lane undivided John Ringling Parkway as it heads through areas of trees. The state road enters residential areas and curves northeast before turning to the northwest and heading over a drawbridge and heading into Longboat Key. Here, SR 789 becomes Gulf of Mexico Drive and passes between homes to the northeast and the Longboat Key Golf Club to the southwest. The road continues to the northwest, running between more residences to the northeast and resorts fronting the Gulf of Mexico to the southwest. Farther northwest, the state road heads through resort development on a narrow barrier island with the Gulf of Mexico to the southwest and Sarasota Bay to the northeast.

SR 789 crosses into Manatee County and continues through more resort residential and commercial development in Longboat Key. Farther northwest, the road turns to the north and comes to a drawbridge over Longboat Pass. At this point, the state road heads onto Anna Maria Island and becomes Gulf Drive South, passing through areas of trees. SR 789 enters Bradenton Beach and heads into areas of resort homes and businesses, with the beach along the Gulf of Mexico immediately to the west of the road. The road comes to an intersection with the western terminus of SR 684 and becomes Gulf Drive North, heading through more resort areas. The state road briefly curves northwest before heading north again and crossing into Holmes Beach. Here, SR 789 becomes East Bay Drive and passes through areas of homes and businesses with some woods to the east of the road before coming to its northern terminus at an intersection with SR 64.

City Route 789 (Gulf Drive) has a rather odd beginning where it branches off of its SR 789 counterpart instead of continuing straight from its northern terminus. It first meets SR 64 in Holmes Beach, which goes to Bradenton. It then passes by Marina Drive, along with several shops. It then makes a right turn onto Pine Avenue before ending at North Bay Boulevard and South Bay Boulevard in Anna Maria.

== History ==
The current route of SR 789 was designated as part of SR 18 when it was added to the state highway system, with the route north of Bradenton Beach (known then as Cortez Beach) on Anna Maria Island being designated SR 18A. The route connected Longboat Key and Anna Maria Island via a bridge that was built in 1926, though this bridge was destroyed by a hurricane in 1932. After the 1945 Florida state road renumbering, the route was redesignated as part of SR 780 on Longboat Key and points south, while parts of the route on Anna Maria Island were part of SR 684. At the same time, the SR 789 designation was first applied to present-day Midnight Pass Road, Higel Road, and Siesta Drive on Siesta Key, connecting the island with US 41 in southern Sarasota. SR 789 was also applied to roads connecting to Casey Key.

The connection between Longboat Key and Anna Maria Island was restored in 1957 upon the completion of the current Longboat Pass Bridge. By the time the bridge was completed, the route from St. Armands Circle to the north end of Anna Maria Island was redesignated as a discontinuous segment of SR 789. The John Ringling Causeway would remain as part of SR 780 until the 1980s when it also became part of SR 789.

In the 1960s, SR 789 was rerouted to connect with SR 64 from the south via East Bay Drive.

The Siesta Key segment of SR 789 was later redesignated as SR 758 in the 1980s, which also included Bee Ridge Road east to Interstate 75. The segments of SR 789 to Casey Key were given to county control.

In the early 1980s, SR 789 north of SR 64 on Anna Maria Island was relinquished to county control. Manatee County has since transferred this segment to city control. The city of Holmes Beach has designated this portion as City Road 789 with its own unique shield.

== Bridges ==
=== John Ringling Causeway ===
The John Ringling Causeway carries SR 789 over Sarasota Bay, from Sarasota to St. Armands Key and Lido Key. The 65-foot-tall (20 m) bridge, built in 2003, is a segmental box girder bridge named after John Ringling, one of the founders of the Ringling Brothers Circus and resident of the Sarasota area.

=== New Pass Bridge ===
The New Pass Bridge is a single-leaf bascule bridge that crosses the New Pass, connecting Sarasota and Longboat Key, Florida. The bascule bridge carries John Ringling Parkway, part of SR 789, and it was built in 1986, replacing the original bridge built in 1929.

=== Longboat Pass Bridge ===
The Longboat Pass Bridge carries SR 789 over Longboat Pass, connecting Longboat Key and Bradenton Beach, Florida. It was built in 1957, replacing an old swing bridge that existed from 1926 to 1932.

== Major intersections ==
County	Location	mi	km	Destinations	Notes
Sarasota	Sarasota	0.000	0.000	US 41 (North Tamiami Trail / Bayfront Drive / SR 45) to I-75 / SR 780 – Sarasota-Bradenton Airport, Bradenton	Southern terminus
Sarasota	Sarasota	0.472– 1.058	0.760– 1.703	John Ringling Causeway over Sarasota Bay (Gulf Intracoastal Waterway)	
Sarasota	Sarasota	2.27	3.65	John Ringling Boulevard – Lido Beach	Traffic circle
Sarasota	Sarasota; Longboat Key	3.342– 3.527	5.378– 5.676	New Pass Bridge over New Pass	
Manatee	Longboat Key; Bradenton Beach	13.444– 13.849	21.636– 22.288	Longboat Pass Bridge over Longboat Pass	
Manatee	Bradenton Beach	15.565	25.049	SR 684 east (Cortez Road) to US 41 – Cortez	
Manatee	Holmes Beach	17.616	28.350	SR 64 (Manatee Avenue) – Anna Maria, Bradenton	Northern terminus
1.000 mi = 1.609 km; 1.000 km = 0.621 mi

== Related roads ==
=== County Road 789 ===
County Road 789
- Location: Laurel–Osprey–Casey Key
- Length: 2.1 mi (3.4 km)

County Road 789 (CR 789) is the unsigned designation applied discontinuously to two roads connecting to Casey Key. Both segments were previously discontinuous segments of SR 789.

The southern segment is known as Albee Road, which runs from US 41 (Tamiami Trail) in Laurel east to Casey Key. It crosses the Albee Road Bridge, a two-lane bascule bridge that was built in 1963, replacing a swing bridge built in 1922. Albee Road is named for Fred Albee, who was known for large-scale development of nearby Nokomis and Venice in the 1920s.

The northern segment runs along Blackburn Point Road, which runs from US 41 (Tamiami Trail) in Osprey west to Casey Key. It crosses the historic Blackburn Point Bridge, a historic swing bridge that was built in 1926 to connect the mainland and Casey Key.

=== County Road 789A ===
County Road 789A
- Location: Siesta Key
- Length: 2.6 mi (4.2 km)

County Road 789A (CR 789A) runs on the western side of Siesta Key. The unsigned route begins at Midnight Pass Road (CR 758) and runs west along Beach Road for about 1.25 miles (2.01 km). It then turns north along Ocean Boulevard. It then turns north along Higel Avenue for about 600 feet (180 m) before returning to Midnight Pass Road and terminating.

CR 789A was previously SR 789A. It served as a secondary route to Midnight Pass Road, which was SR 789 before it became SR 758 in the 1980s.

=== City Road 789 ===
City Road 789
- Location: Holmes Beach–Anna Maria
- Length: 4.000 mi (6.437 km)

City Route 789 is a former segment of SR 789 that was transferred to city control.

Major intersections
The entire road is in Manatee County.

Location	mi	km	Destinations	Notes
Holmes Beach	0.00	0.00	SR 789 (East Bay Drive) – Sarasota	Southern terminus
Holmes Beach	0.612	0.985	SR 64 east (Manatee Avenue) to SR 789 – Bradenton	Western terminus of SR 64
Anna Maria	4.000	6.437	North Bay Drive/South Bay Drive	Northern terminus
1.000 mi = 1.609 km; 1.000 km = 0.621 mi
