= Florida State Road 684 =

State highway in Florida, United States

State Road 684
- Cortez Road
- SR 684 highlighted in red

Route information
- Maintained by FDOT
- Length: 8.499 mi (13.678 km)

Major junctions
- West end: SR 789 in Bradenton Beach
- East end: US 41 near Bradenton

Location
- Country: United States
- State: Florida

Highway system
- Florida State Highway System; Interstate; US; State; Former; Pre‑1945; Toll; Scenic
← SR 683	→ SR 685

State Road 684 (SR 684) is a state road located in Manatee County, Florida, United States. The road runs from an intersection with SR 789 in Bradenton Beach east to U.S. Route 41 (US 41) and unsigned SR 55 in South Bradenton. SR 684 is known as Cortez Road its entire length and varies from a two-lane road between Bradenton Beach and Cortez to a four- to six-lane road east of Cortez. The easternmost portion of SR 684 is concurrent with US 41 and is unsigned.

== Route description ==
SR 684 begins at an intersection with SR 789 on the Gulf of Mexico in Bradenton Beach, heading east on two-lane undivided Cortez Road West. The road passes resort development before crossing Sarasota Pass on a drawbridge. At this point, the state road heads into Cortez and gains a center left-turn lane, passing residential development. SR 684 curves southeast and becomes a four-lane divided highway, passing through wooded areas with some trailer parks to the south, with the median turning into a center left-turn lane. The road heads to the east again and continues through residential areas. The state road gains a median again and continues between homes and businesses to the north and fields to the south. SR 684 heads into Bradenton and heads east through residential and commercial development as a four-lane divided highway. The road widens to six lanes as it continues through business areas and comes to an intersection with US 41/US 41 Bus./SR 45 in South Bradenton. At this intersection, US 41 heads south on unsigned SR 45 while US 41 Bus. heads north on unsigned SR 45. It is here that SR 684 signage ends and that US 41 turns east to form a concurrency with the unsigned SR 684, with US 41/SR 684 continuing east on Cortez Road West. The road passes through more commercial areas, heading to the south of the DeSoto Square shopping mall. After passing the mall, US 41 curves north to follow unsigned SR 55 on 1st Street, while SR 684 briefly follows 44th Street East eastbound and 44th Street Connector westbound before ending. The road continues east as locally maintained 44th Avenue East.

== History ==
Present-day Cortez Road became a major route connecting the Tamiami Trail in Bradenton with Anna Maria Island in the 1920s, with the original Cortez Bridge to Anna Maria Island opening in 1922. The original bridge ran from the mainland southwest across the bay to Bridge Street on the island. When the road was added to the state highway system, it was designated as SR 18A, which also continued along Gulf Drive to the north end of Anna Maria Island. At the same time, SR 18 also ran concurrently along the western segment of Cortez Road. SR 18 ran from Longboat Key, then east along Cortez Road, and then north to Bradenton along Palma Sola Drive.

Cortez Road was redesignated SR 684 after the 1945 Florida state road renumbering. SR 684 would also continued north along Gulf Drive to the northern end of Anna Maria Island when it was first designated. SR 684 was truncated to its current western terminus in the 1950s when the current Longboat Pass Bridge opened, leading to Gulf Drive being redesignated as SR 789.

The original Cortez Bridge was replaced with the current bridge in 1956. Part of the original bridge, located at the end of Bridge Street, is now the Bridge Street Pier.

== Major intersections ==
The entire route is in Manatee County.

Location	mi	km	Destinations	Notes
Bradenton Beach	0.000	0.000	SR 789 (Gulf Drive) – Longboat Key, Holmes Beach	Western terminus
	0.113– 0.611	0.182– 0.983	Cortez Bridge over Sarasota Bay (Gulf Intracoastal Waterway)	
	3.971	6.391	75th Street West (CR 64 north) - De Soto National Memorial	
South Bradenton	7.754	12.479	US 41 south / US 41 Bus. north (14th Street West / SR 45) – Palmetto, Sarasota	West end of US 41 overlap
South Bradenton	8.499	13.678	US 41 north (SR 55) / 44th Avenue Connection	
1.000 mi = 1.609 km; 1.000 km = 0.621 mi
