= Cortez Bridge =

Bridge in Florida, United States

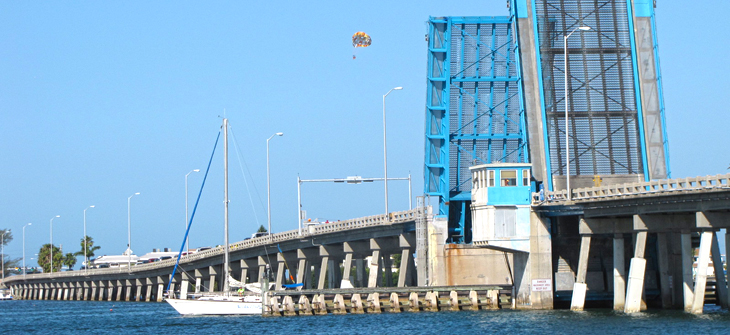
- The Cortez Bridge raising for sailboat in 2012.
- Coordinates: 27°28′07.6″N 82°41′36.7″W
- Carries: SR 684
- Crosses: Sarasota Bay
- Locale: Bradenton Beach, Florida
- Official name: Cortez Bridge
- Maintained by: Florida Department of Transportation

Characteristics
- Design: Bascule
- Total length: 2,616 feet
- Width: 37 feet
- Clearance above: 20 feet

History
- Opened: 1921 (original bridge); 1956 (current bridge)

Statistics
- Daily traffic: 15,100
- Toll: None

The Cortez Bridge is a double-leaf bascule bridge that connects the barrier islands of Bradenton Beach, and the mainland of Cortez, Florida. It crosses the Sarasota Bay, carries Cortez Road, part of SR 684, and was built in 1956, replacing a swing bridge built in 1921.

The current bridge was designated by the 1965 Legislature of Florida.

In 2017, the Florida Department of Transportation began plans to replace the Cortez Bridge with a high-level bridge. Construction is expected to begin in the mid-2020's. The new bridge will be 65 feet above the surface, and it will allow 98% of boats to pass underneath.

== See also ==
- Anna Maria Island Bridge
- Longboat Pass Bridge
