= Edgeville =

Edgeville may refer to:

- Edgeville, Florida
- Edgeville, a fictional town in the online game RuneScape
