= Elling Eide =

Elling Oliver Eide (August 22, 1935 - January 2, 2012) was an anthropologist whose work included ancient Chinese literature. The Eide family's along Sarasota Bay in Florida is now the Elling Eide Center, a 73 acre preserve, arboretum, and research center in Sarasota, Florida. It includes a nature preserve and a library for China studies. He amassed a large collection of Chinese books.

Eide was born in Chicago, Illinois. He graduated Suma Cum Laude from Harvard in 1957. He served in the United States Marine Corps reaching the rank of Lieutenant. He became an educator and translated works from Chinese including poetry. He also had an interest in horticulture.

In 2025, the Elling Eide Center's land manager, Lee Amos, received an award for his work to improve and restore natural ecosystems.
