= Beulah Rebecca Hooks Hannah Tingley =

- Born: August 24, 1893; Clermont, Florida, U.S.
- Died: April 7, 1986 (aged 92)
- Political party: Democratic

Beulah Rebecca Hooks Hannah Tingley (August 24, 1893 – April 7, 1986) was born in Clermont, Florida. She was the daughter of Thomas Jefferson Hooks, who served in the Florida Legislature Clermont, Florida from 1893 to 1895. Tingley was a member of the Democratic National Committee and Chair of the Democratic Party of Florida and a member of the National Committee. She championed women's causes throughout her life. She seconded the nomination of Franklin Delano Roosevelt at the 1932 Democratic National Convention, becoming only the second woman to address a Democratic National Convention. She was an activist and it was said, "She had a loud clear voice and wore broad brimmed hats that created a presence on the campaign trail." She was a confidant of the late Claude Pepper.

A resident of Bradenton Beach, (Anna Maria Island) Florida in her later life, after becoming a member of the Bradenton Beach Library Board and noting the lack of space for a public library, she bequeathed more than $600,000 for the construction and operation of a permanent library in Bradenton Beach. She was an avid reader, citing a need for "a quiet place where books could be enjoyed" The Tingley Memorial Library serves residents and visitors with the aid of volunteers and without tax dollars. Beulah Tingley's Great Floridian plaque is located above the front door of the Tingley Memorial Library in Bradenton Beach, Florida.
