= Sandy, Florida =

- Unincorporated area
- Location within Florida Location within the United States
- Coordinates: 27°16′25″N 82°06′56″W
- Country: United States
- State: Florida
- County: Manatee County
- Elevation: 59 ft (18 m)
- GNIS feature ID: 294917

Sandy is an unincorporated area in Manatee County, Florida, United States. The community was previously known as Sandy Branch and Stephen.

== History ==
Sandy is a small agricultural community in the Myakka area located south of another small community, Edgeville. Earliest records of the community show that in 1883, a post office was established there with Thomas A. Stephens as postmaster. At that time, the community was called Stephen, likely in reference to the Stephens family. The post office was closed and moved to Pine Level within only a couple years. Early newspaper records show that after the post office closed, the community became known as Sandy Branch, but by the late 1890s, it was more widely known as just Sandy. In 1889, the post office reopened again under Postmaster Thomas A. Stephens, who also opened the first general store that year.

By 1900, Sandy was home to 164 people. By this time, the community had grown enough to warrant its own society section in the Manatee River Journal newspaper.

In 1913, a new building was constructed for Sandy School. The same year, the post office was closed.
