= Rufus P. Jordan House =

Historic house in Florida, United States

- U.S. National Register of Historic Places
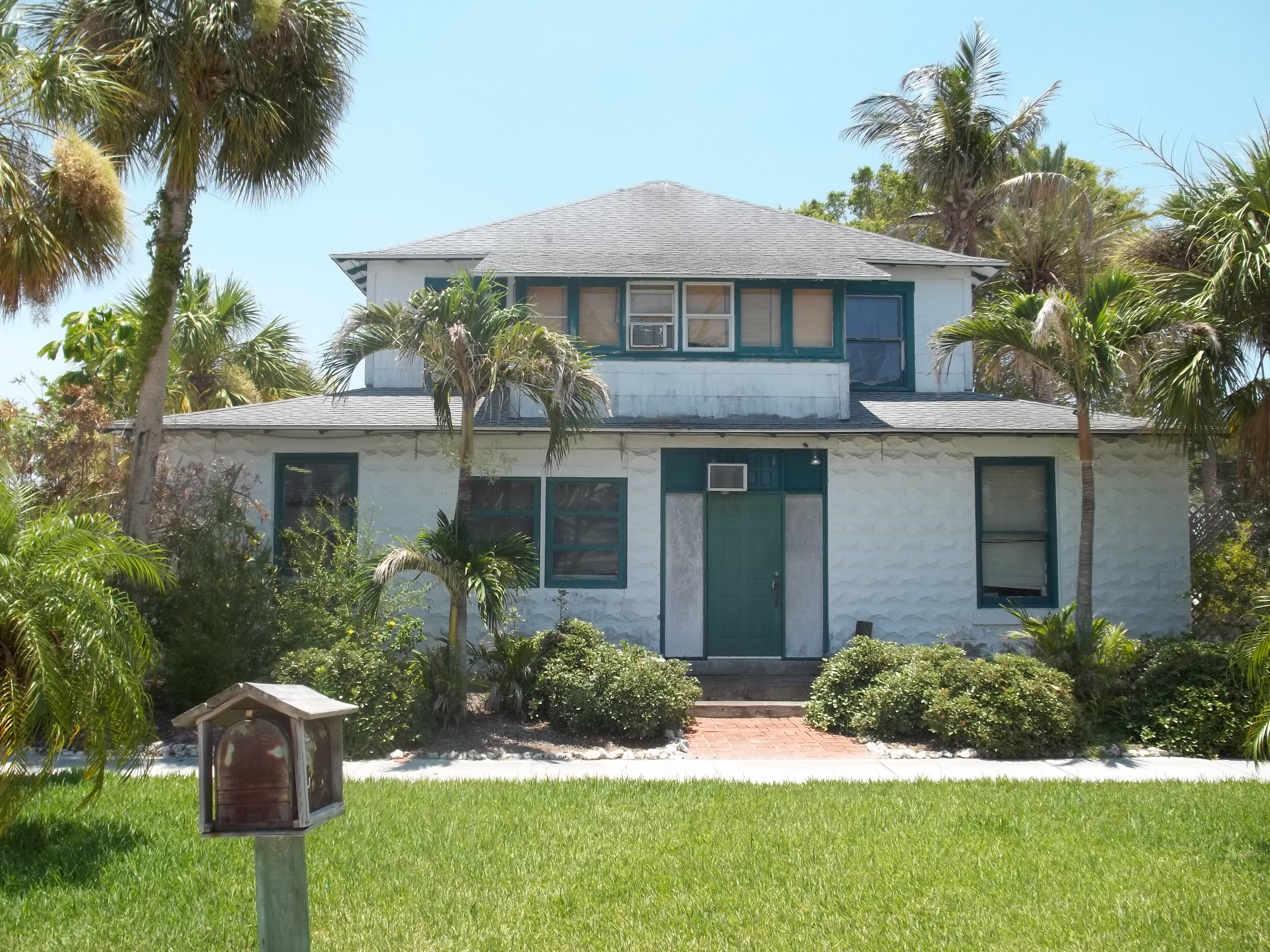

- Location within Florida Location within the United States
- Location: 760 Broadway St., Longboat Key, Florida
- Coordinates: 27°26′16″N 82°40′55″W
- Area: 1.1 acres (0.45 ha)
- Built: 1920
- Built by: Rufus P. Jordan
- NRHP reference No.: 05000844
- Added to NRHP: August 12, 2005

The Rufus P. Jordan House, also known as Mar Vista, is a historic house located at the north end of Longboat Key in Manatee County, Florida. The house is built out of rusticated cement blocks fabricated on site. Rufus P. Jordon built the house for himself and the same remained a single family residence until 1942, when then owners, Wayne Sipe and his wife, along with the relatives of Rufus Jordan and his wife, divided it into apartments.

In the 1980's, the house became the Mar Vista Restaurant. Then, on August 12, 2005, it was added to the National Register of Historic Places.
