= Longboat Pass Bridge =

Bridge in Florida, United States of America

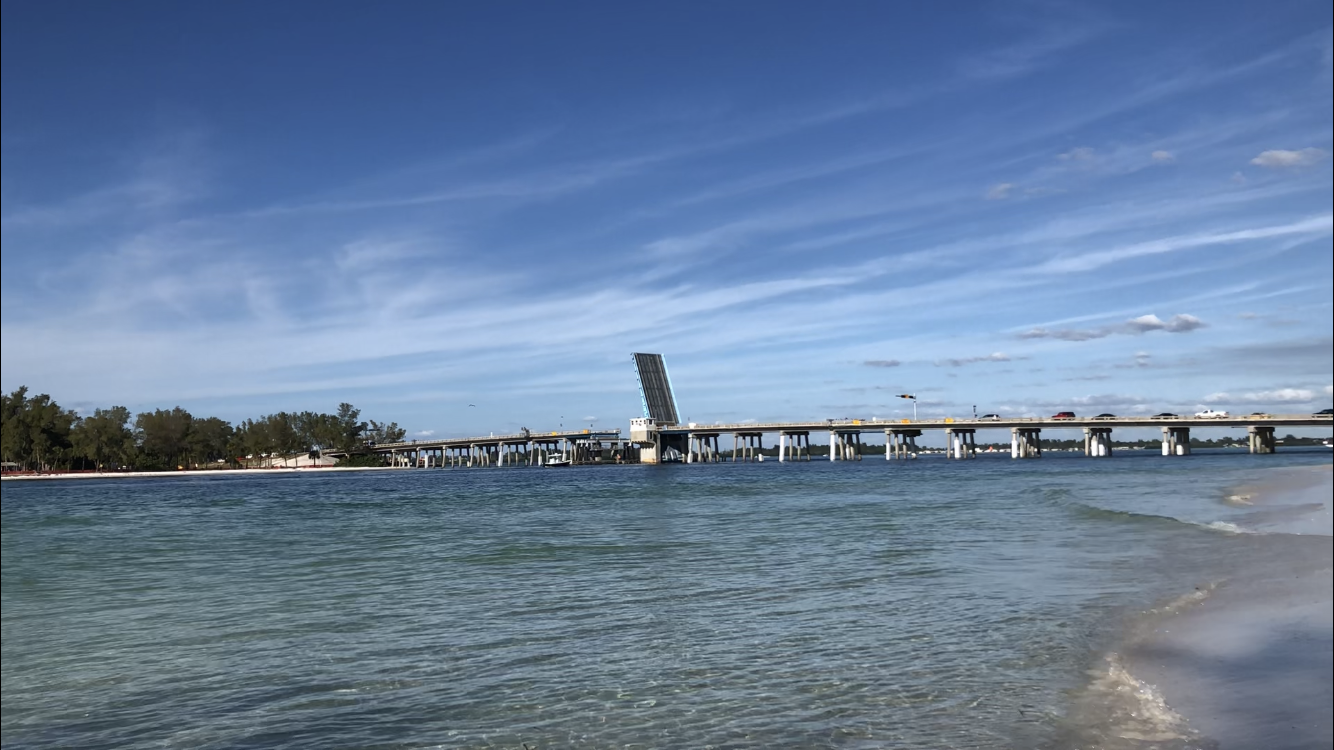
- The Longboat Pass Bridge raising for sailboat in 2019.
- Coordinates: 27°26′39.0″N 82°41′17.0″W
- Carries: SR 789
- Crosses: Longboat Pass
- Locale: Longboat Key, Florida
- Official name: Longboat Pass Bridge
- Other name: Longboat Key Bridge
- Maintained by: Florida Department of Transportation

Characteristics
- Design: Bascule bridge
- Total length: 2,129 feet
- Width: 37 feet
- Clearance above: 20 feet

History
- Opened: Original Bridge: 1926; Current Bridge: 1957

Statistics
- Daily traffic: 11,805
- Toll: None

Location
- Interactive map of Longboat Pass Bridge

The Longboat Pass Bridge (also known as Longboat Key Bridge) is a single-leaf bascule bridge that crosses the Longboat Pass, connecting Longboat Key and Bradenton Beach, Florida. The bridge carries State Road 789, which is known as Gulf Drive on Anna Maria Island, and Gulf of Mexico Drive on Longboat Key.

== History ==
The Longboat Pass Bridge was built in 1957. It was built at the site of a former bridge that had been built in 1926. In 1932, the original Longboat Pass Bridge was washed away by a hurricane, severing the connection between Longboat Key and Anna Maria Island. Remains of the structure were found by Jewfish Key which were reused for a new bridge to Snead Island. The connection between the two islands would not be restored until 1957, when the current Longboat Pass Bridge opened.

The Longboat Pass Bridge is designated by the 1965 Legislature of Florida.

== See also ==
- Anna Maria Island Bridge
- Cortez Bridge
