= John Ringling Causeway =

Bridge over Sarasota Bay, Florida, United States

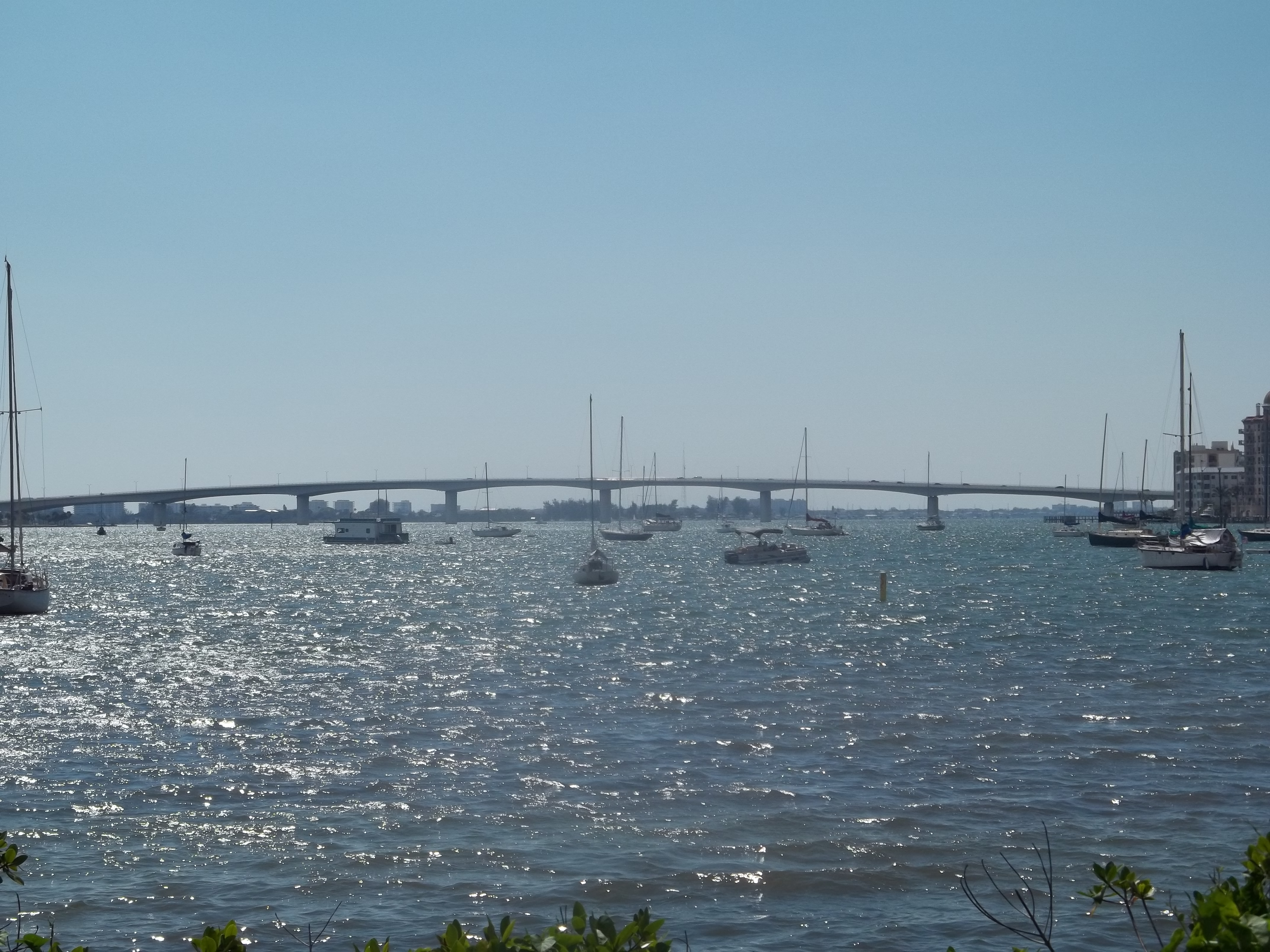
- View of bridge and Sarasota Bay from the Sarasota Recreational Trail
- Coordinates: 27°19′34″N 82°33′46″W
- Carries: 4 lanes of SR 789, bus lane, bicyclists, and pedestrians
- Crosses: Sarasota Bay
- Locale: Sarasota, Florida
- Official name: John Ringling Causeway
- Other names: Ringling Bridge; Gil Waters Bridge
- Named for: John Ringling
- Owner: Florida Department of Transportation (FDOT)
- ID number: 170176

Characteristics
- Design: Segmental box girder bridge
- Material: Concrete
- Total length: 3,097.04 ft (944 m)
- Width: 106.35 ft (32 m)
- Height: 65 ft (20 m)
- No. of spans: 11
- No. of lanes: 4
- Design life: 75 years

History
- Constructed by: PCL Construction
- Construction cost: $20 million (1959 bridge) $68 million (2003 bridge)
- Opened: Original Causeway: 1925; Second Bridge: 1959; Current Bridge: August 30, 2003

Statistics
- Daily traffic: 33,000 (2014)
- Toll: None

Location
- Interactive map of John Ringling Causeway

John Ringling Causeway (also known as Ringling Bridge or Gil Waters Bridge) is a causeway in the US state of Florida that extends past the Sarasota Bay, from Sarasota to St. Armands Key and Lido Key. The 65-foot-tall (20 m) bridge, built in 2003, is a segmental box girder bridge running from Sarasota to Bird Key. Another short bridge carries the causeway from Bird Key to Coon Key and St. Armand's Key. The causeway is named after John Ringling, one of the founders of the Ringling Brothers Circus and resident of the Sarasota area.

== History ==
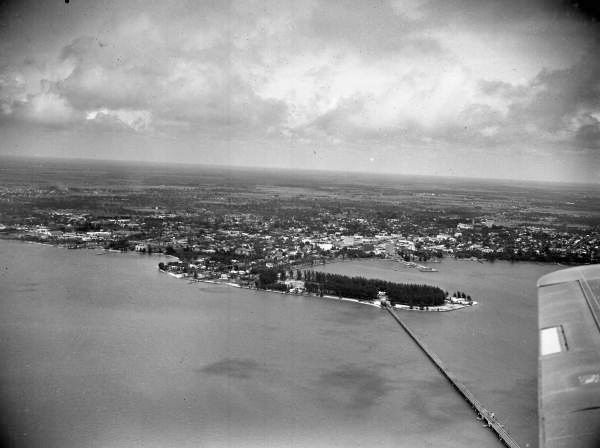
Original Ringling Causeway in 1946

The causeway and its original bridge were built in 1925 by John Ringling, who owned large tracts of land on both Lido and Longboat Keys. Ringling wanted to develop the islands and financed the cost of the bridge at the cost of approximately $750,000, equivalent to $13.8 million in 2025, to connect the islands with the mainland. The ornate bridge opened for traffic on February 7, 1926. It was labeled "one of the greatest engineering accomplishments in the South” by the Sarasota Herald, which also proclaimed, “There are no words adequate with which to express our appreciation.” The original bridge began at the south end of Golden Gate Point in Sarasota. Ringling donated the bridge to the city in 1927.

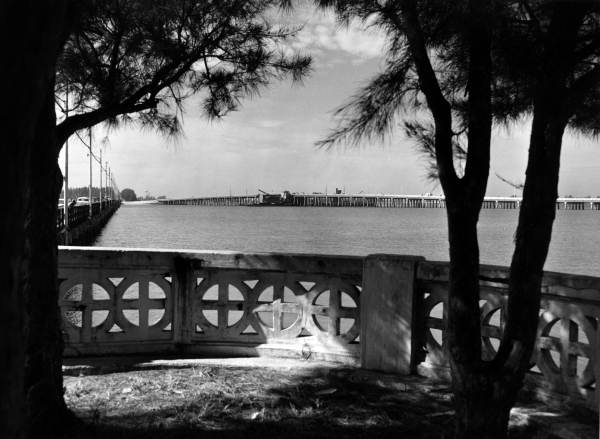
Original 1925 bridge (left) and its replacement under construction (right) in 1958

Around 1950, the first bridge began to show that it could not adequately handle increasing traffic to the islands. In 1951, the State Road Department opted to replace the original bridge with a four-lane drawbridge, which was completed and opened to traffic in 1959. The four-lane drawbridge was 20 feet tall and was built connecting directly connecting to Gulf Stream Avenue in Sarasota, about a quarter of a mile north of the original bridge. The bridge from Bird Key to St. Armand's Key was replaced a year prior with the set of bridges carrying four lanes, which are still in service. The drawbridge was built for $20 million, and the original bridge was demolished.

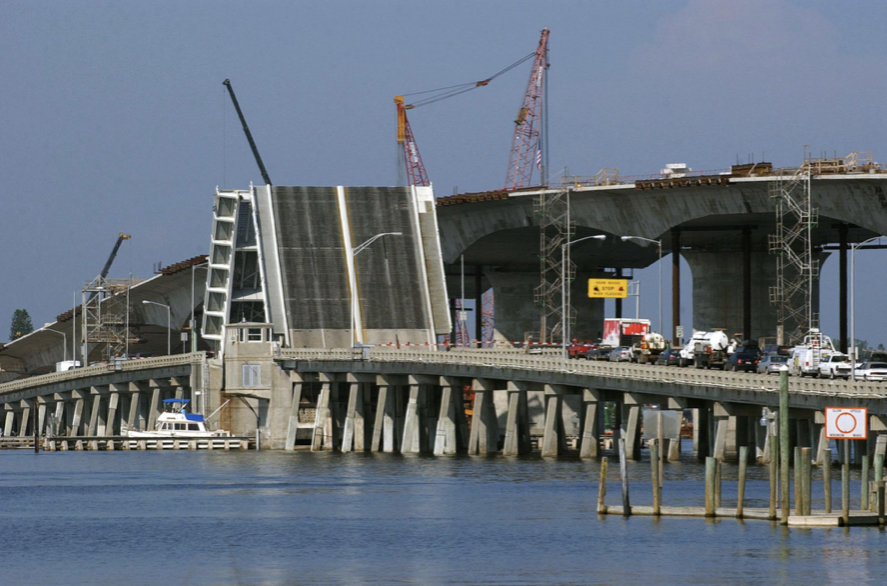
1959 bascule bridge with the current bridge under construction

Around 2000, the 1959 drawbridge began to suffer the same fate as its predecessor. With the drawbridge opening as many as 18 times a day, it was unable to handle increasing amounts of traffic to the islands. To remedy the situation, construction began on the current high-span bridge in 2001. The 65-foot (20 m) tall bridge opened for traffic in 2003 for $68 million. Landscaping around the bridge was financed by private donors.

Color-changing LED lighting was added to the bridge in 2019. In 2026, improvements were performed on the bridge to include the addition of dedicated bicycle and transit lanes.
