= Lido Key =

Island in Florida, United States

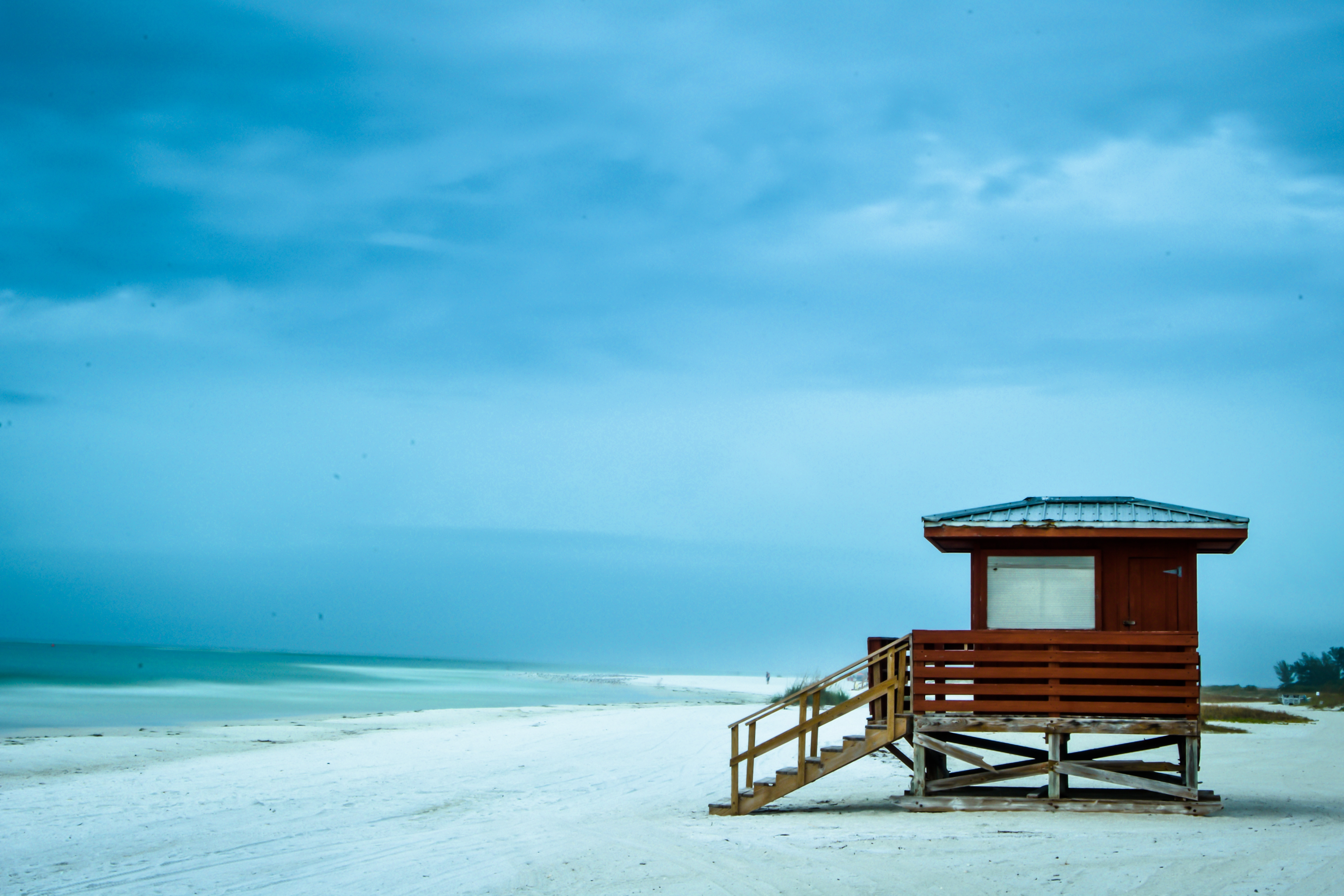
- Lido Beach, 2015

- Lido Key Lido Key (the Caribbean)

Geography
- Location: Gulf of Mexico
- Coordinates: 27°19′01″N 82°34′53″W

Administration
- United States
- State: Florida
- County: Sarasota

Lido Key is a barrier island off the coast of Sarasota, Florida, in the United States. It is part of the city of Sarasota and is connected to mainland Sarasota by John Ringling Causeway.

== Nearby keys ==
To its north is Longboat Key; to its east are Bird Key and St. Armands Key; and to its south is Siesta Key.

== Description ==
The island features numerous sandy beaches facing the Gulf of Mexico, as well as a park called "South Lido Park", which has a beach and a woodland trail. The island is well developed with a wide variety of luxury hotels and beach houses, and has a seasonal nightclub scene. While not as popular as Siesta Key Beach, Lido Key Beach is reviewed as a more private beach that is more relaxing for the tourists who come from around the world to visit it. Weddings and other private parties will often book a section of the beach for their guests.

== History ==
In February 1926, a causeway built by John Ringling connecting Lido Key & St. Armands Key would be built. The Lido Beach Hotel that was 2 floors would be delivered by a barge in sections of the building in 1932. A casino would be proposed in 1936 as a way to improve the city's tourism by Roger Flory a member of the Sarasota chamber of congress. Flory proposed that the municipal government should provide a bathing beach being later expanded to include a bathing facility of sorts. The chamber of congress would meet with the Sarasota city council where a committee was formed. The site selected would be on the property of John Ringling's estate managed by John Ringling North on Lido Key. The Lido Beach Casino would be built in 1940 as a Works Progress Administration project with Ralph Twitchell being its architect. The casino had a ballroom, restaurants, shopping, a pool and cabanas. Rudy Bundy would often play at the casino's ballroom. During World War II, the casino would be a popular place for nearby soldiers to spend time. In 1964 a bond referendum of $250,000 would be passed in order to renovate it. It would end up being torn down despite not intending to be in 1969 and the rationale behind its demolition is not clear. Possible reasons are that the Casino's restaurant was in competition with nearby hotels and/or a decline in revenue from cabana rentals.

=== 1955 Beach segregation protests ===
Like many other beaches during the Jim Crow era in the southeastern United States, Lido beach was an all-white beach. On October 2, 1955, about 100 African American residents of the Newtown neighborhood in Sarasota went to Lido Beach to do a wade-in. The wade-in protest was organized by the Sarasota NAACP president, Neil Humphrey Sr. and at the time less than two miles of beaches were allowed for use by black people in Florida. After the protests occurring, prominent members of the Sarasota community and local newspapers called for exploring possible locations for a beach for local black residents. A bond issue was passed to expand beach facilities and also create an African American beach. However the beach was never established. The two primary reasons for this was that both the city government and the county could not agree on which party would responsible for it along with not being able to find a suitable location. Four locations that were under consideration were: Big Pass on Siesta Key, somewhere on Longboat Key and an area of beach north of Midnight Pass.

Longboat Key and Siesta Key residents protested against having a beach at their proposed locations. Longboat Key residents held meetings to protest the proposed beach on the island and residents were motivated by this voted to incorporate the island as a way to avoid the placement of the beach there. Siesta Key residents also held meetings, ran a full-page newspaper advertisement at an unknown point, and went to county and city commission meetings to voice their opposition towards the creation of an African-American beach there. Both Siesta Key locations were considered to not be suitable for the beach because of the need for dredging and/or the swift currents that were there. Another option was creating an artificial beach in Sarasota Bay.

The NAACP and Newtown community members continued their protests on a weekly basis. The City of Sarasota started to take more active measures against integration passing city ordinances that gave law enforcement the authority to shut down beaches when African-American bathers would come and to reopen them when they also left. In 1961 the US federal government threatened the City of Sarasota with taking away its funds towards fighting beach erosion if it did not desegregate its beaches. It is unknown at which exact date the beaches became desegregated as there are no known formal declarations of it nor mentioning of it in local newspapers.

== Gallery ==
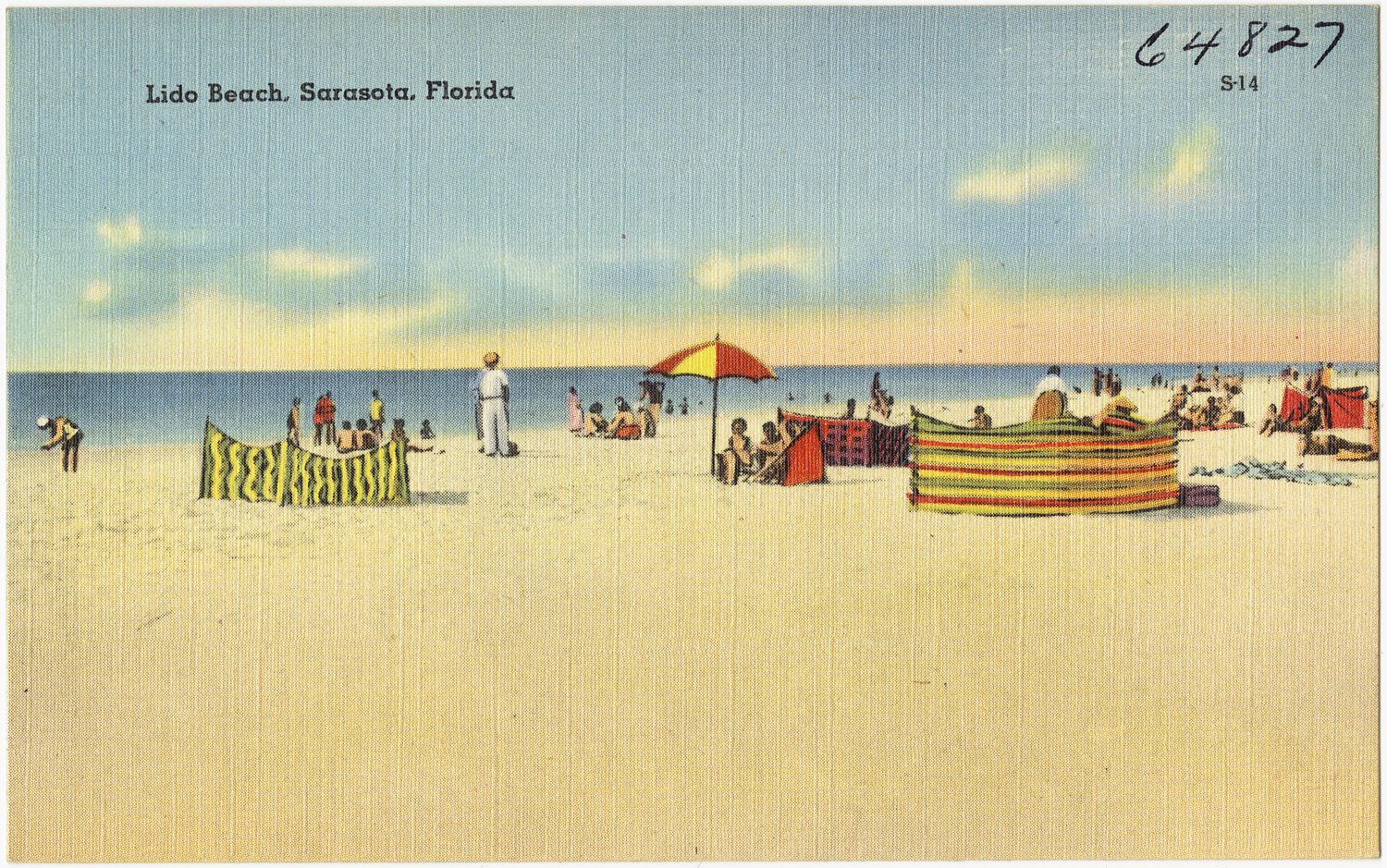
Lido Beach, c. 1930

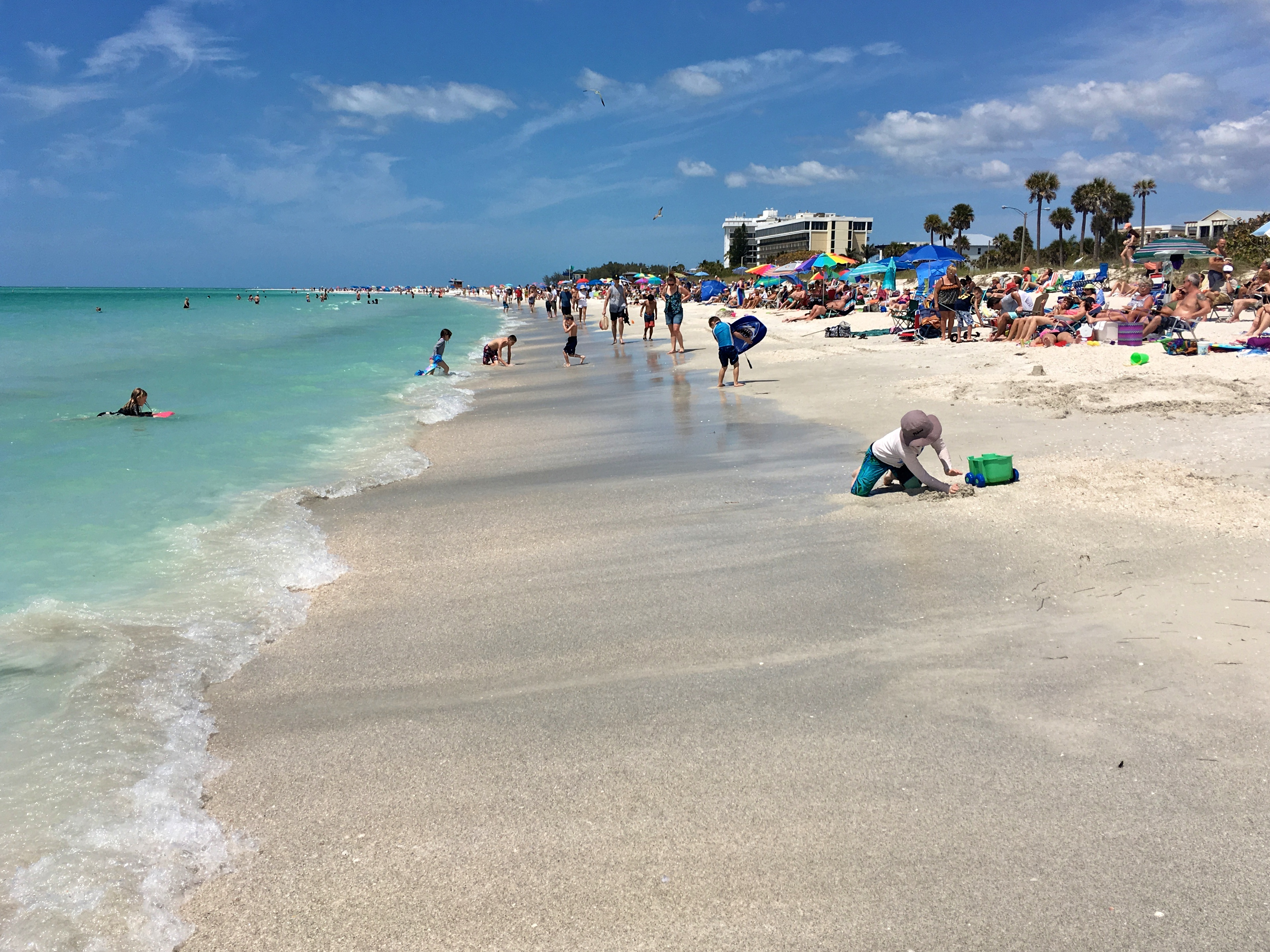
Lido Beach

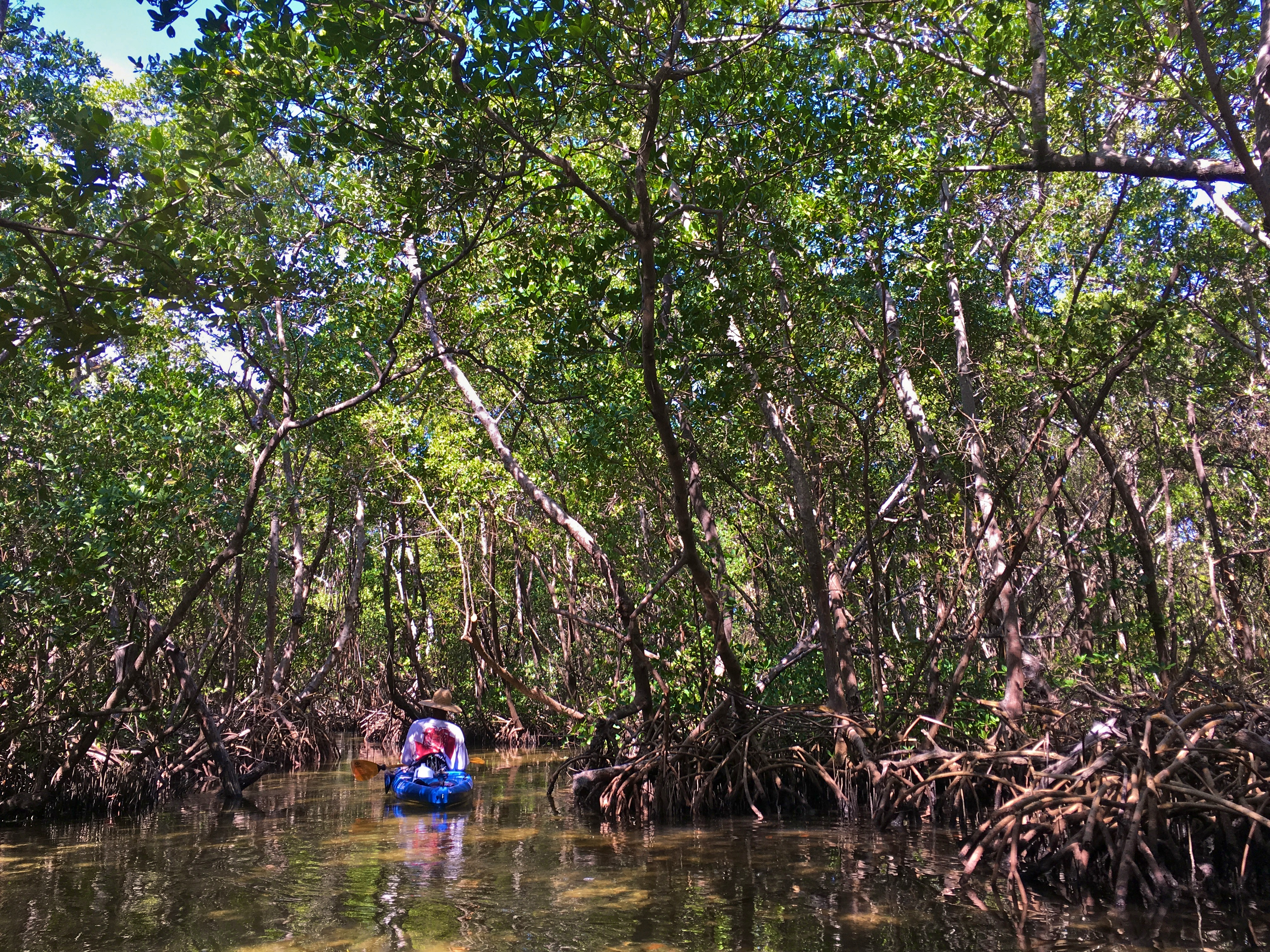
An ecotourist on a kayak tunnels through red mangrove trees and roots
