= Bird Key =

Bird Key, Florida Bird Island
- Location within Florida
- Coordinates: 27°18′59″N 82°33′34″W
- Country: United States
- State: Florida
- Counties: Sarasota

Area
  - Total: 4.9 sq mi (12.7 km^{2})
  - Land: 3.7 sq mi (9.6 km^{2})
  - Water: 1.1 sq mi (2.8 km^{2})
- Elevation: 10 ft (3.0 m)

Population (2000)
  - Total: 857
  - Density: 230/sq mi (89/km^{2})
- Time zone: UTC-5 (Eastern (EST))
  - Summer (DST): UTC-4 (EDT)
- ZIP code: 34236
- Area code: 941
- GNIS feature ID: 293935

Bird Key is a barrier island in Sarasota Bay, south of the John Ringling Causeway, between mainland Sarasota and St. Armands Key. Originally a small barrier island connected to the Ringling Causeway by a tree lined causeway of its own, it was the home of John Ringling North, nephew of circus magnate John Ringling. Created by dredge and fill in the late 1950s, it is approximately 250 acres (1.0 km^{2}) of one of the most prestigious residential areas on Florida's West Coast.
