= St. Armands Key, Florida =

St. Armands Key
- Island
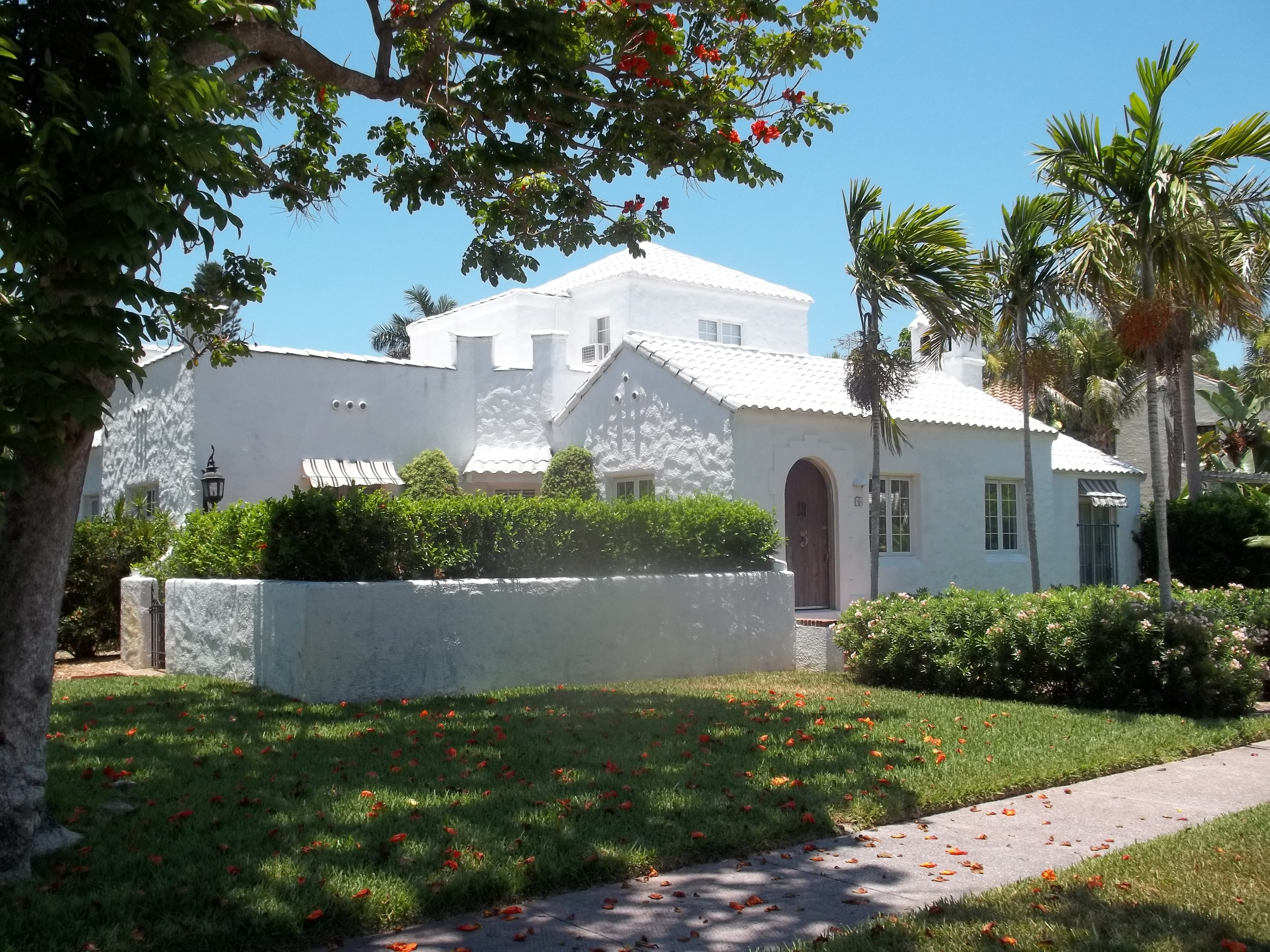
- House on St. Armands Key
- Etymology: Charles St. Armand
- Nicknames: St. Armand's Key, St. Armand Key
- Interactive map of St. Armands Key
- Coordinates: 27°19′06″N 82°34′42″W
- Country: United States
- State: Florida
- County: Sarasota

St. Armands Key is an island in Sarasota Bay off the west coast of Florida in the United States. It is part of the city of Sarasota, Florida. The island is connected to the mainland by the John Ringling Causeway.

== History ==
A Frenchman named Charles St. Amand bought property on the island in 1893. His name was misspelled in land deeds, and this misspelled name is still used today.

Circus magnate John Ringling purchased the St. Armands Key property in 1917 and planned a development which included residential lots and a shopping center laid out in a circle. As no bridge to the key had yet been built, Ringling engaged an old paddle-wheel steamboat, the "Success," to service as a work boat. John Ringling financed the construction of a bridge connecting the key to the mainland and became the first person to drive across it in 1926.

== St. Armands Circle ==
St. Armands Key features a large traffic circle with a small park in the center. The traffic circle is known as St. Armands Circle or "The Circle." The area is largely commercial, containing more than 130 stores and restaurants. The circle contains many restaurants, tobacco shops, clothing stores, and other retail outlets.

The Circle also features a statue walk that features works originally purchased by John Ringling. Ringling's love of fine art inspired The Save Our Statues project which was undertaken during 2007 and completed in early 2008. Additional beautification efforts including on-going maintenance of the statues and landscaping generally consistent with John Ringling's 1920s landscape plans.

St. Armands Circle branches off into different directions with the shops on the outside of the circle:

- To the north, State Road 789, which goes to Longboat Key
- John Ringling Boulevard to the east, which goes to the city of Sarasota and intersects U.S. 41 which heads north to Sarasota-Bradenton International Airport
- Lido Key and Lido Beach, to the south

== Circus Ring of Fame ==
St. Armands Circle is also home to the Circus Ring of Fame. Over 150 large bronze plaques encircle the park with the names and histories of performing artists and influential executives recognized for achievement in circus arts and culture. Honorees include Paul Binder, Bello Nock, Nik Wallenda, and the King Charles Troupe.

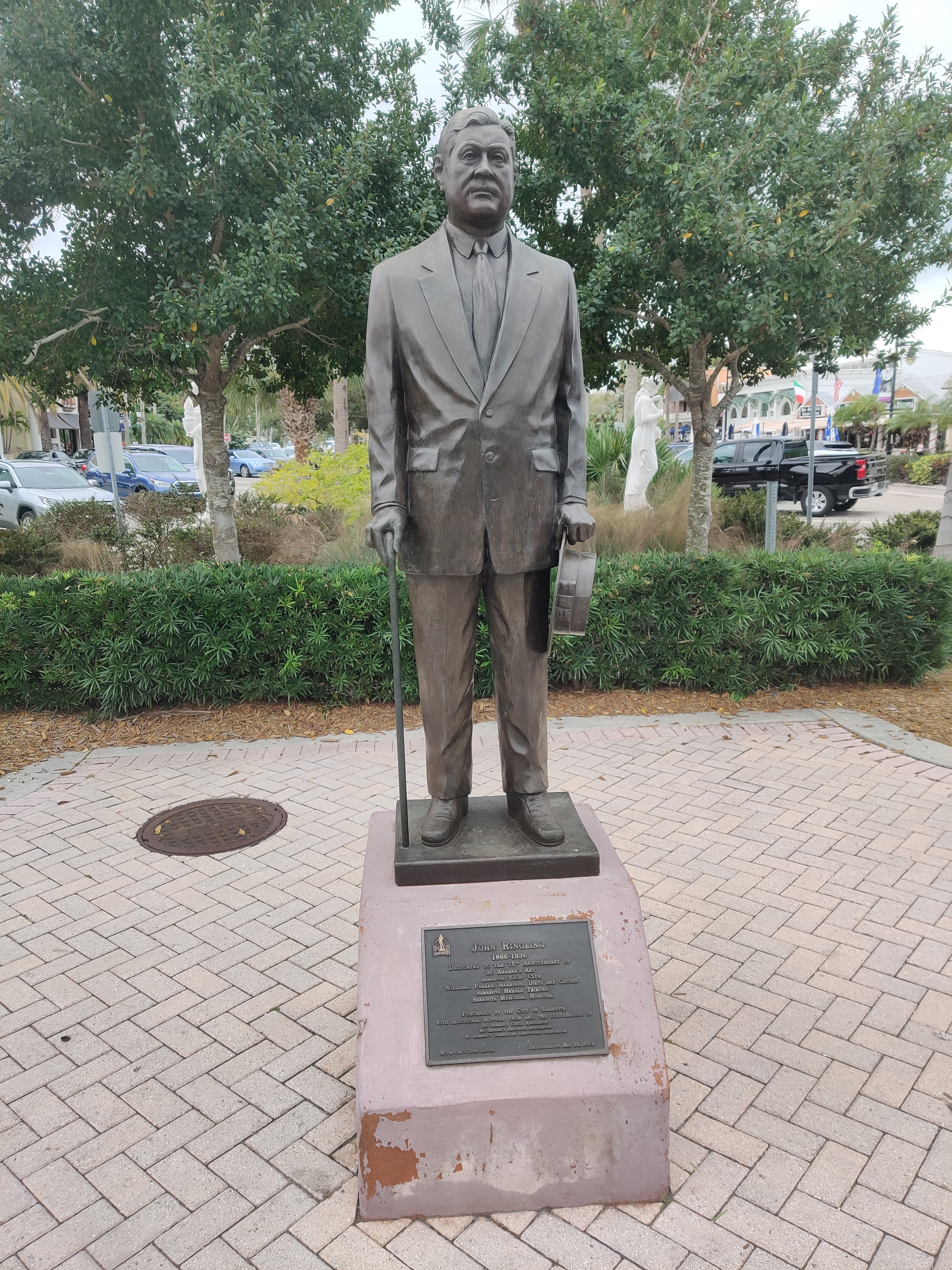
Statue of John Ringling in St Armands Circle
