= Casey Key, Florida =

Casey Key Caseys Key, Treasure Island
- Island
- Location within the state of Florida
- Coordinates: 27°09′00″N 82°28′50″W
- Country: United States
- State: Florida
- Counties: Sarasota
- Elevation: 13 ft (4.0 m)
- Time zone: UTC−05:00 (Eastern (EST))
  - Summer (DST): UTC−04:00 (EDT)
- Area codes: 941
- GNIS feature ID: 280108

Casey Key is a barrier island off the coast of Southwest Florida, located south of Siesta Key. Casey Key is part of the North Port—Sarasota—Bradenton Metropolitan Statistical Area. Casey Key was severely damaged by 2024 hurricanes Helene and Milton.

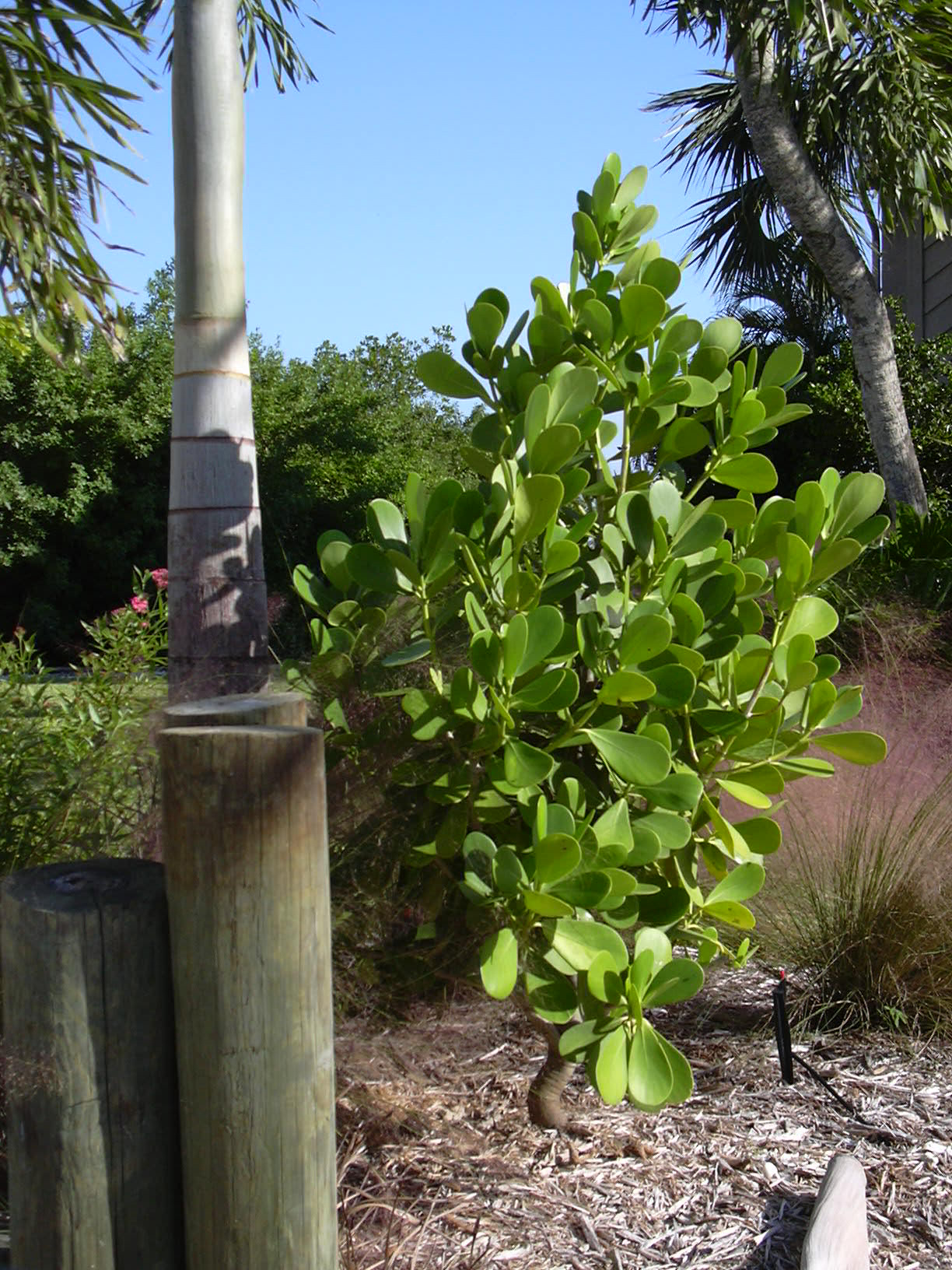
Clusia rosea, Casey Key

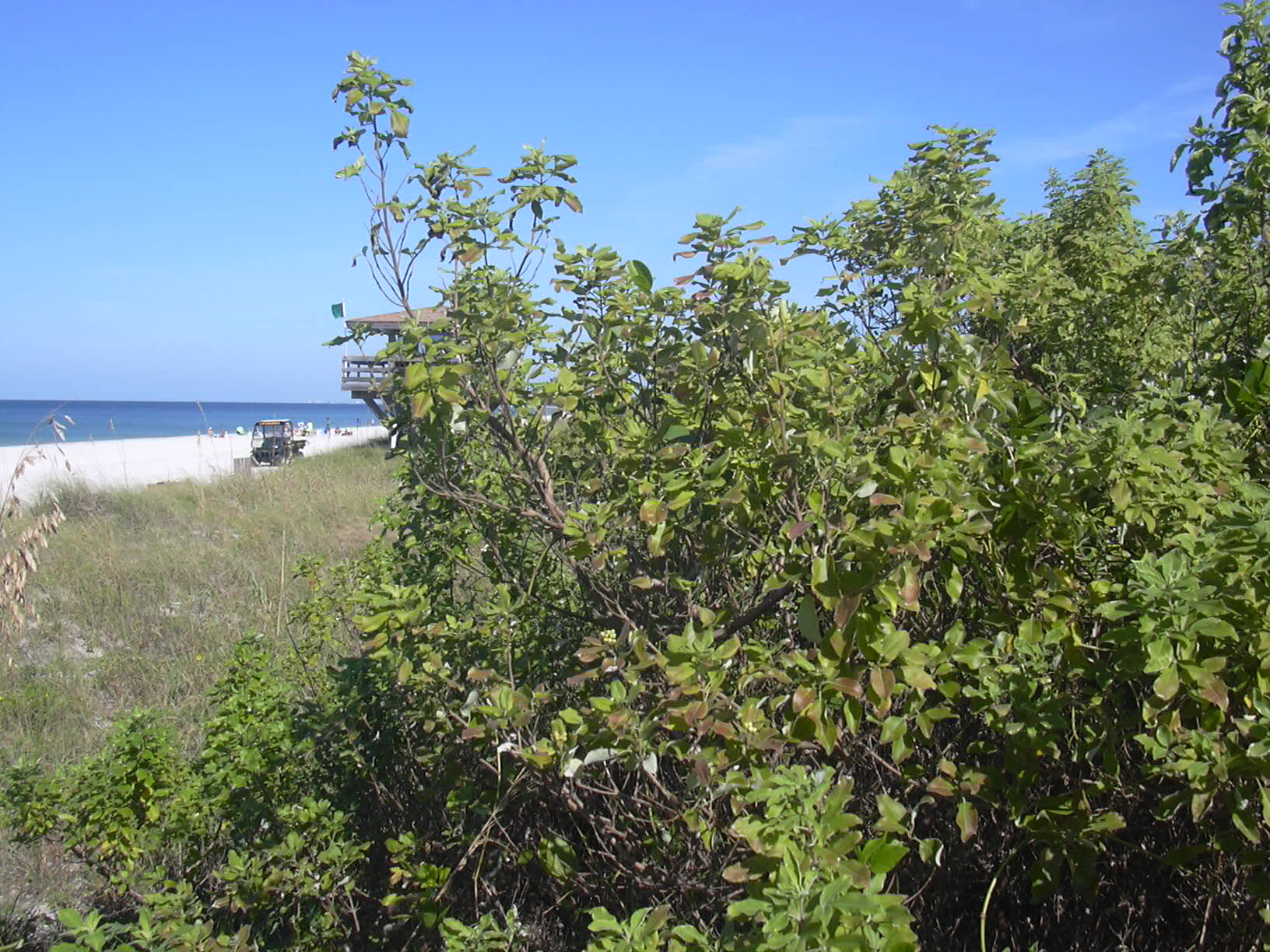
Vitex trifolia, Casy Key (a non-native plant cultivated in Florida)

== History ==
Casey Key is erroneously named after Captain John Charles Casey as a result of a United States Coast Survey chart published in 1851. Captain John Casey and his army were settled at Casey's Key, located south of the island, at the time.
