= Bradenton Beach, Florida =

- City
- City of Bradenton Beach
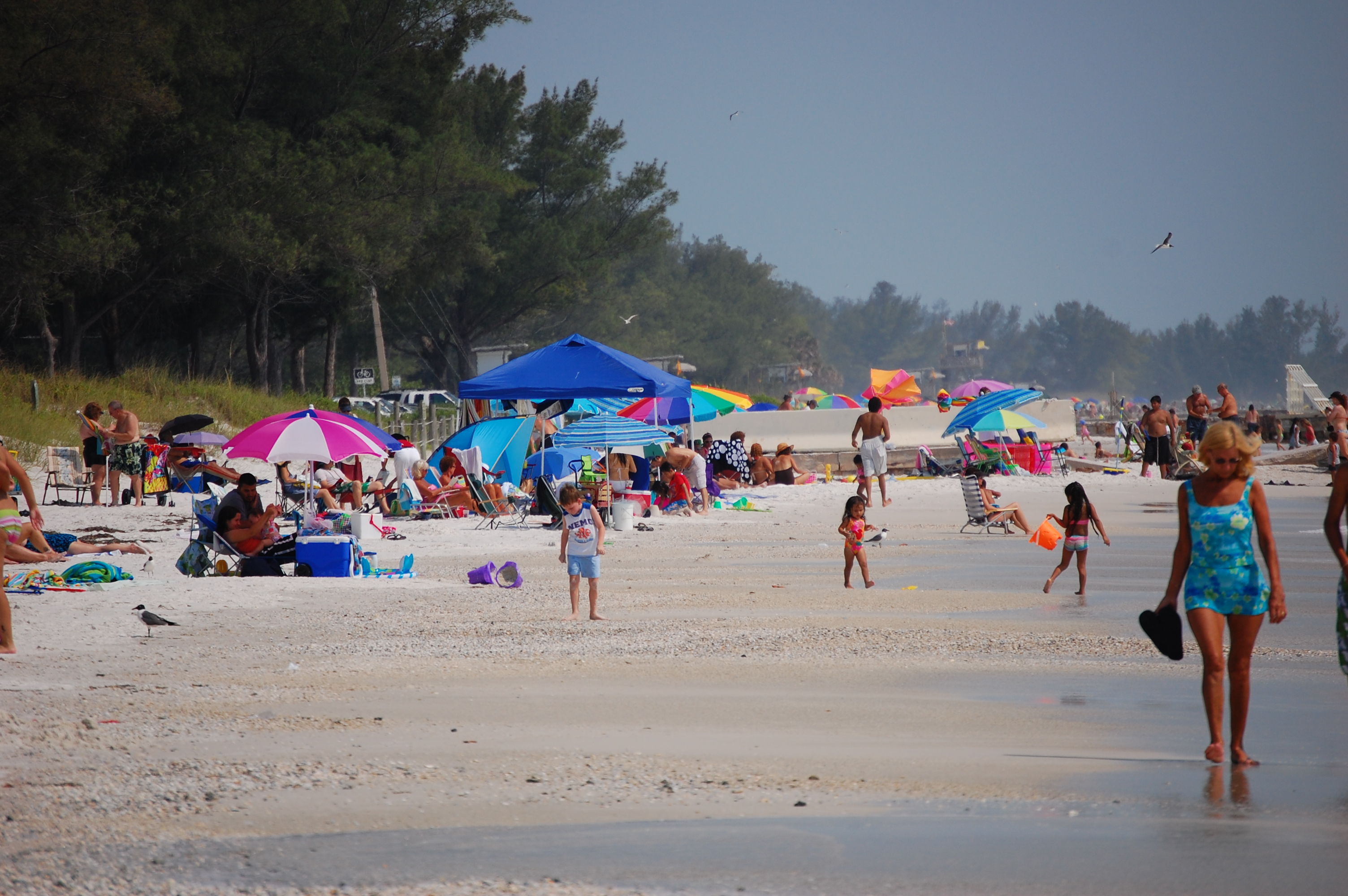
- Bradenton Beach

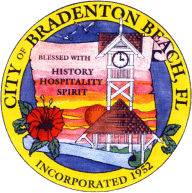
- Seal
- Motto(s): "Blessed with History, Hospitality, & Spirit"
- Location in Manatee County and the U.S. state of Florida
- Coordinates: 27°27′55″N 82°41′46″W
- Country: United States
- State: Florida
- County: Manatee
- Settled (Cortez Beach): 1893
- Incorporated (City of Bradenton Beach): December 21, 1952

Government
  - Type: Mayor-Commission
  - Mayor: John Chappie
  - Vice Mayor: Deborah M. Scaccianoce
  - Commissioners: Bob Talham, Ralph Cole, and Scott Bear
  - City Clerk: Terri Sanclemente
  - City Attorney: Ricinda H. Perry

Area
  - Total: 1.19 sq mi (3.08 km^{2})
  - Land: 0.52 sq mi (1.34 km^{2})
  - Water: 0.67 sq mi (1.74 km^{2})
- Elevation: 0 ft (0 m)

Population (2020)
  - Total: 908
  - Density: 1,756.4/sq mi (678.15/km^{2})
- Time zone: UTC-5 (Eastern (EST))
  - Summer (DST): UTC-4 (EDT)
- ZIP codes: 34217-34218
- Area code: 941
- FIPS code: 12-07975
- GNIS feature ID: 2403908
- Website: www.cityofbradentonbeach.com

Bradenton Beach is a city on Anna Maria Island in Manatee County, Florida, United States. The population was 908 at the 2020 census, down from 1,171 in 2010. It is part of the North Port-Bradenton-Sarasota, Florida Metropolitan Statistical Area.

The city occupies the southern part of Anna Maria Island and is one of three municipalities on the island. The others are Holmes Beach in the center and Anna Maria in the north.

== History ==
=== Pre-1950 ===
==== 1920s & 1930s ====
The City of Bradenton Beach was settled in 1893, and referred to as "Cortez Beach" since it was close to the community of Cortez. Construction on a wooden bridge to the mainland began in the summer of 1921. The 1921 Tampa Bay hurricane that October destroyed 80% of the bridge that was built up to that point. Despite a majority of the bridge being destroyed, it was completed sometime in June 1922, eight months later.

A two-story pavilion at the end of Bridge Street was built that same year. It had 100 lockers along with a dance hall and dining room located in the center of the building. On the second floor, the owners of the pavilion had their apartments. It would burn down after a fire and was later rebuilt. The pavilion was destroyed by fire for a second time in 1929 and was never rebuilt. The name "Bradenton Beach" began being used during the mid 1920s as the Florida land boom was occurring. Real estate developers saw this as a way to convince possible buyers that it was closer to Bradenton. Sometime in early 1926, a county bond was approved to build a wooden bridge linking Bradenton Beach to Longboat Key; the bridge was finished in August. However, the bridge was only open until October, when a hurricane damaged it. On March 6, 1932, the bridge was swept away during a high tide. It would not be replaced until 1957.

==== 1940s ====
The Regina, a tanker barge with over 350,000 gallons of molasses onboard and eight crew, sank 200 yards offshore on a sandbar on March 8, 1940. Regina was under tow by a tugboat, Minima and the line that was towing it had broken near Egmont Key. Both vessels had decided to try and go into Tampa Bay seeking shelter because of the weather conditions. One of the crew members, its cook and a German Shepherd onboard the ship would die during an attempt to leave the ship. All seven other crew members were rescued.

A post office called Bradenton Beach has been in operation since 1941.

=== Post-1950 ===
Bradenton Beach was incorporated on December 21, 1952, after an 84–56 vote to become a city. Bernard Wagaman served as Bradenton Beach's first mayor; he owned a cottage rental apartment complex there named Wagaman's Modern Apartments.

The main wooden bridge to the island from Cortez was replaced by a concrete one in 1957 as local residents wanted a stronger bridge. A parade led by an elephant was hosted by the city to display its strength and to convince the local residents as well. To offset the cost of the bridge, the local government made it a toll bridge until 1964 when it was reimbursed. Cars were charged 30¢ entering the island, and no toll was charged on those leaving the island.

== Geography ==
Bradenton Beach occupies the southern part of Anna Maria Island, between the Gulf of Mexico to the west and Anna Maria Sound to the east. The city is bordered to the north by Holmes Beach and to the south, across Longboat Pass, by Longboat Key. To the east, across Anna Maria Sound, is the unincorporated community of Cortez, connected to Bradenton Beach by the Cortez Bridge. The city of Bradenton is 10 miles (16 km) to the east.

According to the United States Census Bureau, Bradenton Beach has a total area of 1.19 square miles (3.08 km^{2}), of which 0.52 square miles (1.35 km^{2}) are land and 0.67 square miles (1.74 km^{2}), or 56.55%, are water.

=== Climate ===
The climate in this area is characterized by hot, humid summers and generally mild winters. According to the Köppen climate classification, the City of Bradenton Beach has a humid subtropical climate zone (Cfa).

== Demographics ==
Historical population
Census	Pop.	Note	%±
1960	1,124		—
1970	1,370		21.9%
1980	1,603		17.0%
1990	1,657		3.4%
2000	1,482		−10.6%
2010	1,171		−21.0%
2020	908		−22.5%
U.S. Decennial Census

=== 2010 and 2020 census ===
Bradenton Beach racial composition (Hispanics excluded from racial categories) (NH = Non-Hispanic)
Race	Pop 2010	Pop 2020	% 2010	% 2020
White (NH)	1,095	835	93.51%	91.96%
Black or African American (NH)	16	9	1.37%	0.99%
Native American or Alaska Native (NH)	6	0	0.51%	0.00%
Asian (NH)	10	5	0.85%	0.55%
Pacific Islander or Native Hawaiian (NH)	0	0	0.00%	0.00%
Some other race (NH)	0	1	0.00%	0.11%
Two or more races/Multiracial (NH)	12	26	1.02%	2.86%
Hispanic or Latino (any race)	32	32	2.73%	3.52%
Total	1,171	908		

As of the 2020 United States census, there were 908 people, 495 households, and 255 families residing in the city.

According to the 2020 US Census there was 472 females and 436 males. Holmes Beach had a median age of 65.2 years. A total of 1,769 housing units existed at the time of the 2020 US Census with 523 (29.6%) being occupied and 1,246 (70.4%) being vacant. Of those which were vacant the most common was for units which were: "For seasonal, recreational, or occasional use" at 881 or 49.8% of all housing units in Bradenton Beach.

As of the 2010 United States census, there were 1,171 people, 697 households, and 296 families residing in the city.

=== 2000 census ===
At the 2000 census, there were 1,482 people, 803 households and 391 families residing in the city. The population density was 2,704.9 inhabitants per square mile (1,044.4/km^{2}). There were 1,762 housing units at an average density of 3,215.9 per square mile (1,241.7/km^{2}). The racial makeup of the city was 98.52% White, 0.27% African American, 0.13% Native American, 0.13% Asian, 0.34% from other races, and 0.61% from two or more races. Hispanic or Latino of any race were 1.69% of the population.

In 2000, there were 803 households, of which 11.2% had children under the age of 18 living with them, 40.3% were married couples living together, 5.9% had a female householder with no husband present, and 51.2% were non-families. 40.1% of all households were made up of individuals, and 13.1% had someone living alone who was 65 years of age or older. The average household size was 1.85 and the average family size was 2.40.

In 2000, 10.6% of the population were under the age of 18, 4.5% from 18 to 24, 24.9% from 25 to 44, 35.2% from 45 to 64, and 24.9% who were 65 years of age or older. The median age was 50 years. For every 100 females, there were 102.7 males. For every 100 females age 18 and over, there were 102.0 males.

In 2000, the median household income was $32,318 and the median family income was $46,583. Males had a median income of $26,146 compared with $20,772 for females. The per capita income for the city was $22,850. About 3.9% of families and 7.3% of the population were below the poverty line, including 5.9% of those under age 18 and 6.9% of those age 65 or over.

== Library ==
The Tingley Memorial Library is located at 111 2nd Street, North, behind City Hall. It was built with a $600,000 bequest from the estate of Beulah Rebecca Hooks Hannah Tingley (1893–1986) and is maintained without the use of public funding. In 2000, Beulah Tingley was declared a "Great Floridian" by the state and a plaque attesting to that honor was placed above the front door of the library.
