= Edgeville, Florida =

- Unincorporated community
- Location within Florida Location within the United States
- Coordinates: 27°18′52″N 082°06′29″W
- Country: United States
- State: Florida
- County: Manatee
- Founded: 1915
- Time zone: UTC-5 (EST)
  - Summer (DST): UTC-4 (EDT)
- Area code: 941

Edgeville was a former company town and railway stop located southeast of Myakka City in Manatee County, Florida, United States. Turpentine was made in the area and later a crate manufacturer was located in Edgeville. A school for African American children was established in the community.

== History ==
Edgeville was established in 1915 as a turpentine company town by the Edge-Howard Company on the East and West Coast Railway. The town was located about halfway between Myakka City and Pine Level.

In August 1917, the Edgeville post office was established, but closed only a year later. Mail for the community was rerouted back through the Myakka City post office.

In 1919, a public school for African-American children was opened at Edgeville. The white children of Edgeville attended school in Myakka City.

In 1921, Edgeville became home to the Manatee Crate Company, who owned a tract of 5000 acres and a mill where logs were collected and cut for the construction of crates at their factory in Manatee. About 75 structures were built by the company for housing workers.

With the exception of the crate mill employees, there were very few families living in Edgeville by the early 1920s. In 1923, only 19 households were listed in the Bradenton Area Directory.

In 1926, a subdivision known as Manatee Springs was planned for the Edgeville area. A golf course was built to serve the future community, which fell apart during development due to the 1927 real estate crash in Florida.

Edgeville has remained an agricultural area, home to a large dairy farm, nursery, and ranch. It is part of the larger Myakka City area and has no retailers or community buildings and few residents.

== See also ==
- Myakka City, Florida
