= Sarasota Bay =

Lagoon located in Florida, United States

Coordinates: 27°24′08″N 82°35′53″W

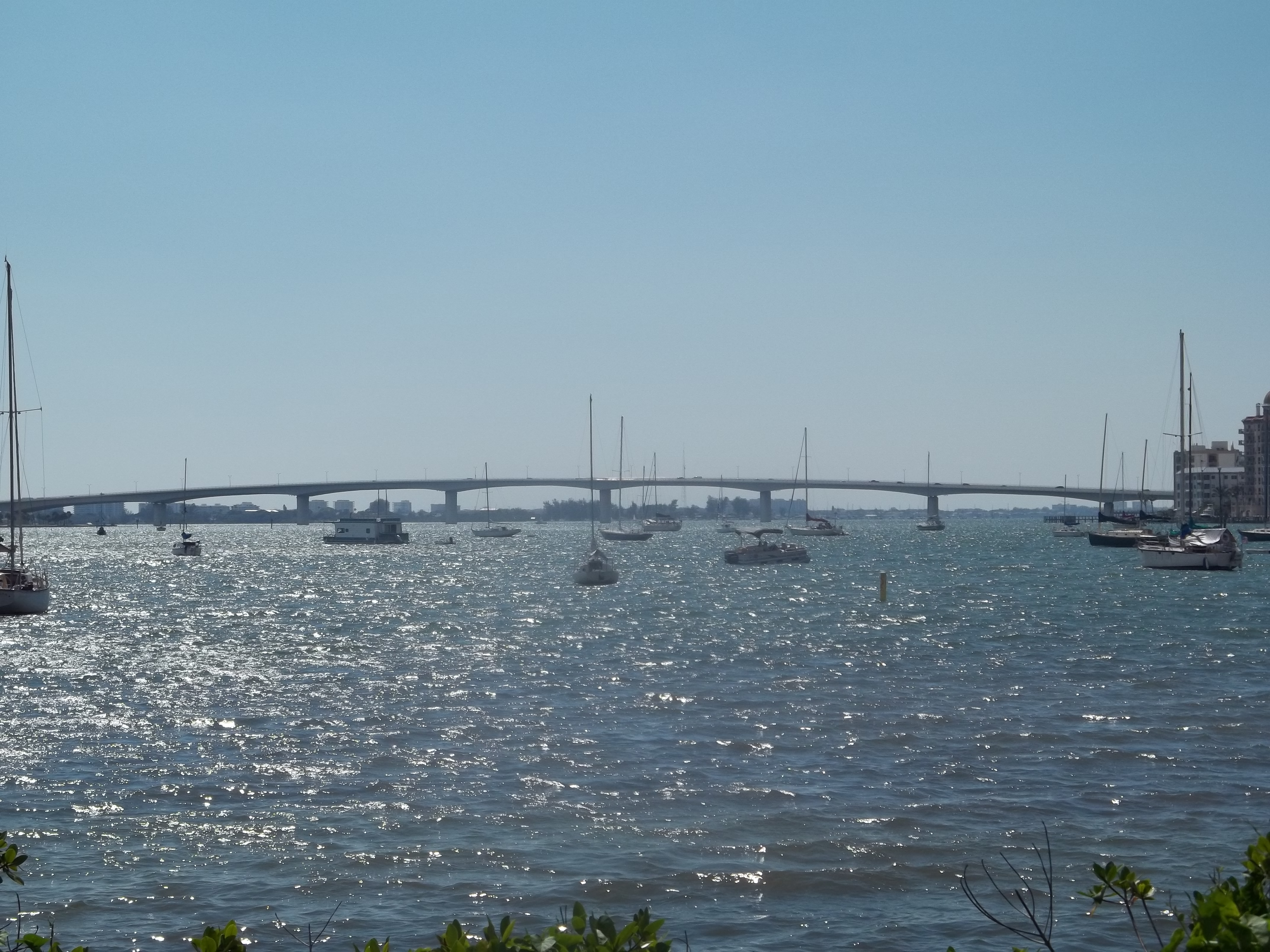
- John Ringling Causeway to St. Armand Circle, across Sarasota Bay

- Location within Florida

Location
- Country: United States
- State: Florida
- Counties: Sarasota, Manatee

Basin features
- Protection status

Sarasota Bay is a lagoon located off the central west coast of Florida in the United States. Though no significant single stream of freshwater enters the bay, with a drainage basin limited to 150 square miles in Manatee and Sarasota counties, it is generally treated as an estuary, with three "passes" or inlets giving access from the Gulf of Mexico. Its source of freshwater has been increased from natural historical levels by urban runoff.

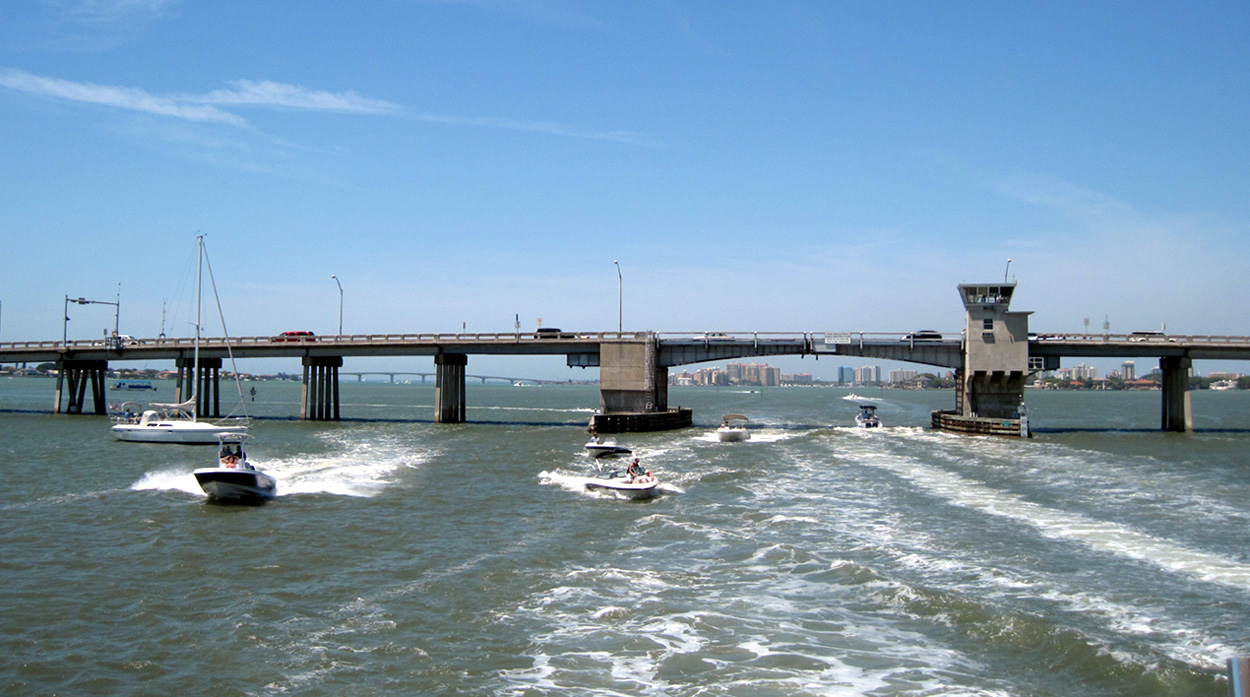
The Siesta Key Bridge, carrying Siesta Drive, crosses the bay at its southern end.

The bay and its surrounding area appeared on the earliest maps of the area, being named Zarazote on one dating from the early 18th century. Hunting in the area had supported native populations for more than ten thousand years as Florida attracted some of the earliest human settlements in the hemisphere. Following the retreat of the glaciers, ocean levels rose creating the current coastline and the natural bounty of Sarasota Bay provided food for inhabitants for over five thousand years before Europeans began exploration of the area in 1513 and later, establishing settlements along its shores.

Sarasota Bay, the largest and deepest coastal bay between Tampa Bay and Charlotte Harbor, is one of twenty-eight estuaries in the country that have been named by the U.S. Congress as an estuary of national significance. The bay lies between barrier islands called keys, that separate the body of water from the Gulf of Mexico and the Florida mainland. Longboat Key, Lido Key, Siesta Key, and Casey Key are the major keys that delineate the main bay and its smaller portions.

== Ecotourism ==
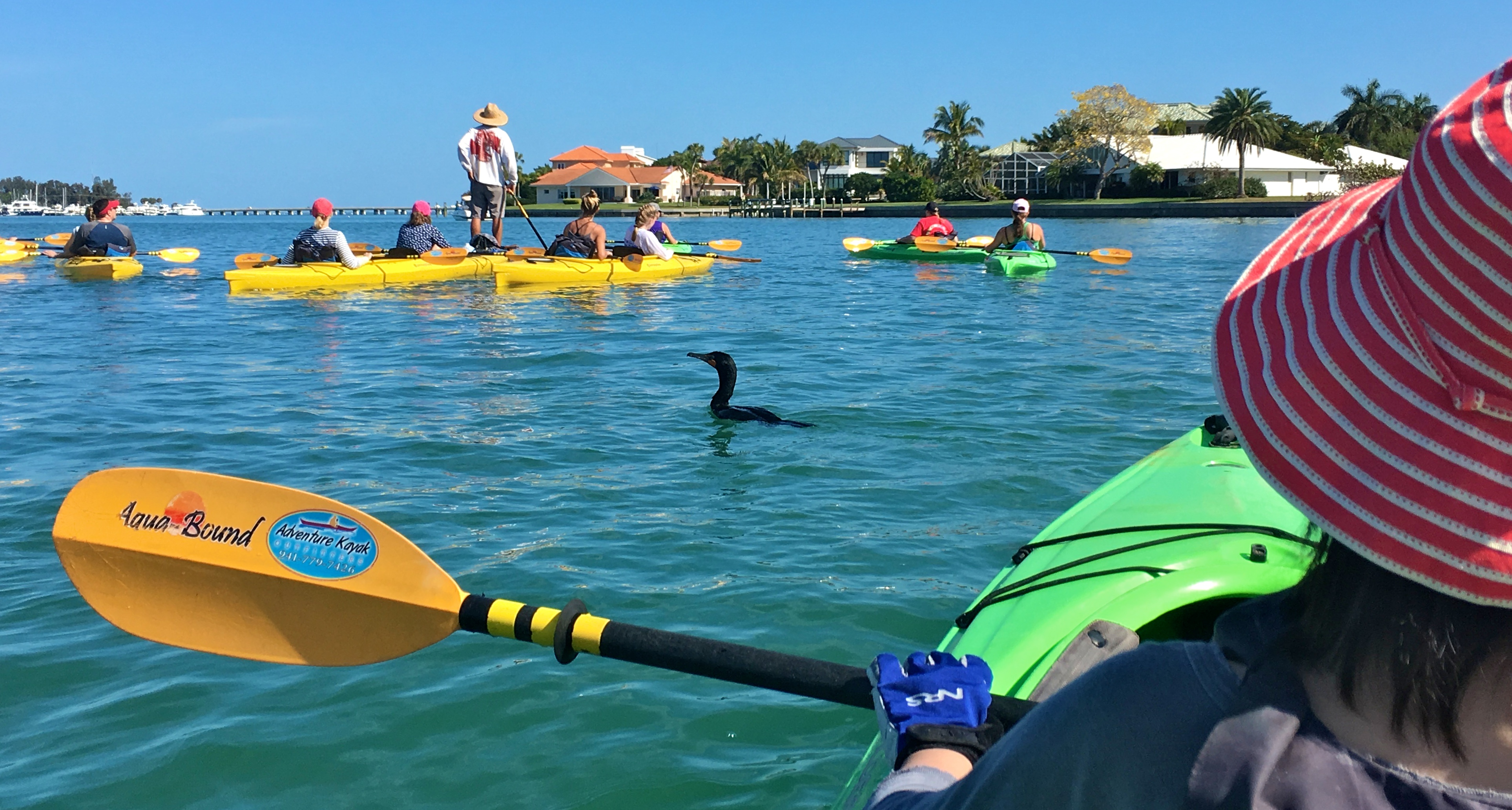
Ecotour guide stands on a kayak spotting dolphins and manatees, around Lido Key

Ecotourism based on kayak trips is gaining in popularity in Sarasota Bay. Guided kayak trips take kayakers on a tour of the local ecosystem. Kayakers can watch dolphins breach and manatees eat sea grass, in shallow bay water.
