= Longboat Key, Florida =

- Town
- Town of Longboat Key
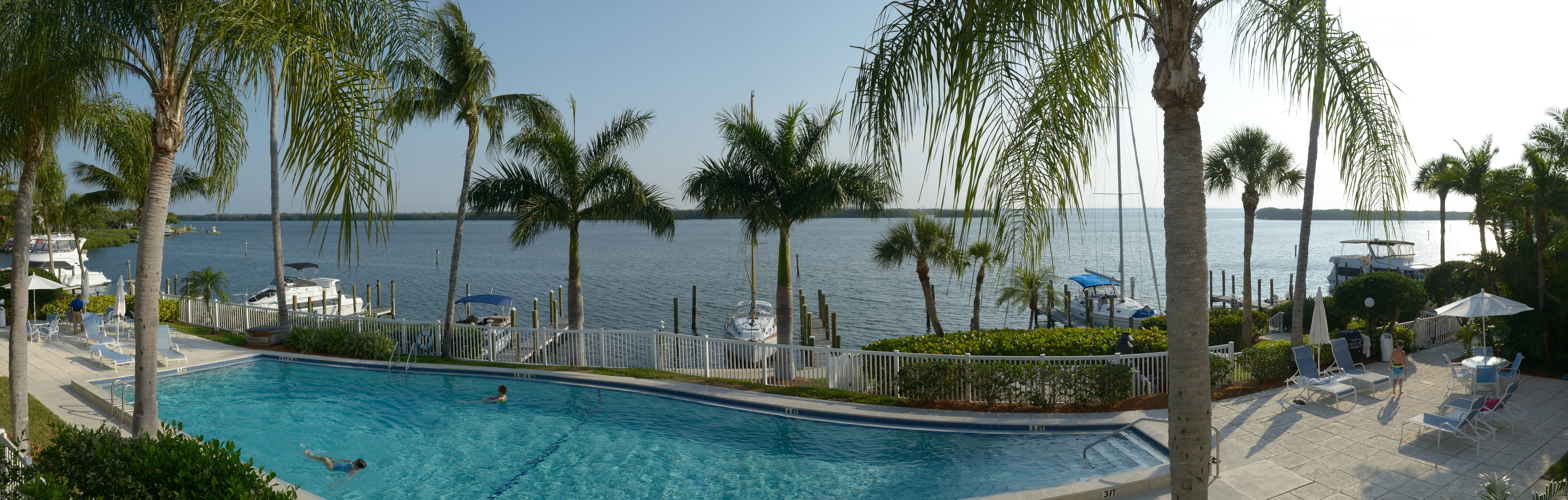
- View of Millar bay and Sister Keys from a Longboat Keys residence

- Seal
- Motto(s): Premier Community, Exceptional Service
- Location in Manatee County and the state of Florida
- Coordinates: 27°22′43″N 82°37′41″W
- Country: United States
- State: Florida
- Counties: Sarasota, Manatee
- Settled: 1842-1891
- Incorporated: November 13, 1955

Government
  - Type: Commission–manager

Area
  - Total: 16.00 sq mi (41.44 km^{2})
  - Land: 4.08 sq mi (10.56 km^{2})
  - Water: 11.92 sq mi (30.88 km^{2})
- Elevation: 0 ft (0 m)

Population (2020)
  - Total: 7,505
  - Density: 1,840.3/sq mi (710.54/km^{2})
- Time zone: UTC-5 (Eastern (EST))
  - Summer (DST): UTC-4 (EDT)
- ZIP code: 34228
- Area code: 941
- FIPS code: 12-41150
- GNIS feature ID: 2406041
- Website: www.longboatkey.org

Longboat Key is a town in Manatee and Sarasota counties along the central west coast of the U.S. state of Florida, located on and coterminous with the barrier island of the same name. Longboat Key is south of Anna Maria Island, between Sarasota Bay and the Gulf of Mexico. It is almost equally divided between Manatee and Sarasota counties. The town of Longboat Key was incorporated in 1955 and is part of the North Port-Bradenton-Sarasota, Florida Metropolitan Statistical Area. The town's population was 7,505 at the 2020 census, up from 6,888 at the 2010 census.

== History ==
Longboat Key was originally inhabited by Native Americans. The area of what is now Longboat Key was scouted by Juan de Añasco, the first known European to explore the key and Hernando De Soto's as his scout. He spent about two months attempting to find a landing site, and he was also most likely the first European man to see and explore Sarasota Bay, Boca Ciega Bay and the Manatee River. According to local legend, he believed the Indians were hostile. When the party reached land on the island, the Indians fled leaving their Longboat in a bayou. Pirate Jean Lafitte was said to have been shipwrecked near or on Longboat Key.

=== 19th century ===
Prior to 1842, Cuban and Spanish fishermen along with some squatters resided on the island. A fishing camp and a trading post for Native Americans existed in the northern part of the key located in what is presently the Longboat Village. At the time, the area was referred to on maps as "Saraxola" and "Zarazote". An 1839 map compiled by order of General Zachary Taylor during the Second Seminole War called the island Palm Island.

There is little known about the island between 1848 and the 1880s, since a hurricane hit the area and destroyed most of Longboat Key. The only thing known is that Charles Abbe had a plantation at an unknown location on the island where citrus and pineapples were grown.

The first people of European descent to claim land on the island were Colin and Rowlin W. Witt, claiming 7.15 acres (2.89 ha) on the north end of the island in 1882. Several others would claim land on the island during the late 1800s, but none of them are known to have lived on the island permanently.

In 1884, Thomas Mann claimed 144.5 acres (58 ha) on the key. He and his family moved there in 1888, becoming the first known permanent residents on the key. His home was located somewhere on the north end of the key.

Mann was a carpenter by trade who was originally from Indiana and later moved to Minnesota. During the American Civil War he served the Union under the 7th Minnesota Infantry Regiment. Mann and his family moved to what is known today as Bradenton in 1872. He left because of either a local yellow fever epidemic or prejudice against him from being from the Northern United States. Mann died in 1908 in nearby Cortez. His son, James, claimed 143.5 acres (58 ha) south of his father's land in 1891.

In 1895, with a passage being dug in from Sarasota Bay to Tampa Bay, steamships and paddle boats could access the island. Soon, a mail service was established that brought residents mail from Cortez. Thomas Mann sold his land in 1898 to May and June Pointevesant of Ocean Springs, Mississippi.

=== 20th century ===
Longboat Key's first post office was established in 1907 at Byron Corey's pier at the southern end of the island, where he owned 153.5 acres (62 ha) of land beginning in 1903. Corey also served as Longboat Key's first postmaster. The post office on the sound end lasted until 1921, when it was destroyed by a hurricane.

During the 1910s, the key saw a surge in development and changes to it. The Pointevesants sold their land to Rufus Perry Jordan and Annie Jordan in May 1911. Rufus laid out a community named Longbeach, filling the plat in November 1911. During 1913, another subdivision named Shore Acres that covered 170 acres of land was developed at the "narrowest" part of the island, and was finished by the next year. Another community was also started at about the same time, named Island Beach, located south of it. Longbeach gained its own post office in 1914. During the early 1900s and prior to the 1921 hurricane, Longboat Key had a significant farming presence, with local residents growing a variety of products. A 1912 Sarasota Times headline read: "From a lonely Key, it is now a center of trucking and fruit growing."

In 1921, the key lost most of its agricultural land and buildings during a hurricane. That same year, the island was split between two counties, Sarasota and Manatee.

Starting in 1923, John Ringling purchased a large amount of land on Longboat Key. In February 1926, Ringling entered a contract to develop a luxury hotel named the Ritz-Carlton on the south side of the island. The hotel was to have 200+ rooms, docking facilities and a railroad leading to it to bring guests there. The hotel began construction in March 1926, with a completion date before December 15, 1926 as specified in the contract. An 18-hole golf course would be built next to the hotel as well. Ringling found himself preoccupied with other financial interests, and during that year the Florida land boom began to slow down as well. In November he ordered construction to be stopped on the hotel, and later claimed he would resume construction, but never did.

There were no roads that led to the key until 1929, when a bridge was built to St. Armands. A bridge across Longboat Pass was built in April 1929 and would exist until March 1932.

Starting in 1935, a former Chicago insurance agent named Gordon Whitney started buying up property to construct a series of cottages on the northern end of the island. The area was given the name of Whitney Beach. Whitney intended to have the cottages serve as part of a resort.

In 1936, for the first time, telephone service was brought to the southern part of the island.

In 1937, John Ringling North, the head of the estate of John Ringling, who had died in 1936, announced that Martin Sweeney had an interest in finishing the Ritz-Carlton Hotel. Sweeney said the hotel would have two 18 hole golf courses, an airport, a club and facilities for fishing, along with 235 rooms when completed. However, these plans would never transpire and the hotel remained in its then-current state.

By 1939 or 1940, telephone service was brought to the North End. Longboat Key got its first newspaper, Gulf Gale, in 1941; it would run until 1944.

In World War II, Longboat Key had a bombing range. In 1942, it was used by B-26 planes, and from 1943 to 1945 by P-40 and P-51 planes. The range was used between 8am and 5pm, which meant that residents on the northern side of the island could not go south of it until after its training sessions.

On November 13, 1955, the town was incorporated by a 186–13 vote at a meeting in a fire station. The meeting itself lasted for 3 hours and 10 minutes in total. Reasons for supporting incorporation included that Longboat Key could have more say in its governmental affairs. It is also believed that the placement of a segregated beach for African-Americans on the island was a motivator behind incorporating it. By incorporating the entire key, they could somehow avoid the placement of the beach altogether. Residents also held meetings protesting the beach's placement. Significant arguments against incorporation were that property taxes would go up. After doing the incorporation vote, Will LePage was elected as the first mayor, along with the first eight members of the Board of Aldermen. At the time, only about a third of Longboat Key was developed, and roughly 215 people lived on the key. When the town was incorporated, it changed its name from Longbeach to Longboat Key.

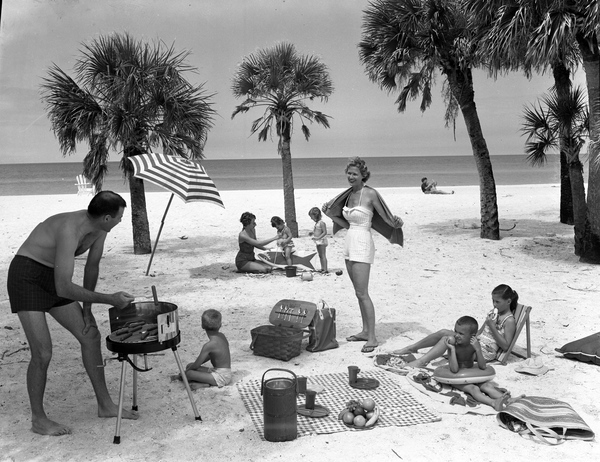
A family at the beach on Longboat Key in 1958

In 1959, the Arvida Corporation created by Arthur Vining Davis purchased 2,000 acres, which included the southern half of Longboat Key, a majority of Lido Key, along with Bird Key, Otter Key, and Coon Key, at a price of $13.5 million. It was expected that the population would be increased by 12,000 extra residents. Some of the land purchased would come from John Ringling North, and on his Longboat Key land included the unfinished Ritz-Carlton Hotel. There was a proposal in 1962 by a Sarasota realtor to finish its construction and make it into a convention site for Sarasota. However, Arvida had no interest in either selling or attempting to finish the hotel. The hotel was torn down between December 1963 and January 1964. Debris from the demolished hotel would be used as fill for the city's civic center and City Island.

=== 21st century ===
On the evening prior to, and day of, the September 11 attacks, President George W. Bush stayed at the Colony Beach and Tennis Resort on Longboat Key before later visiting Emma E. Booker Elementary School in Sarasota. The Colony Resort was selected because it was a location that would be easy to secure.

In early 2024, it was announced that a new public library would be built on Longboat Key. The library is to be a part of the Sarasota County Library System.

== Geography ==
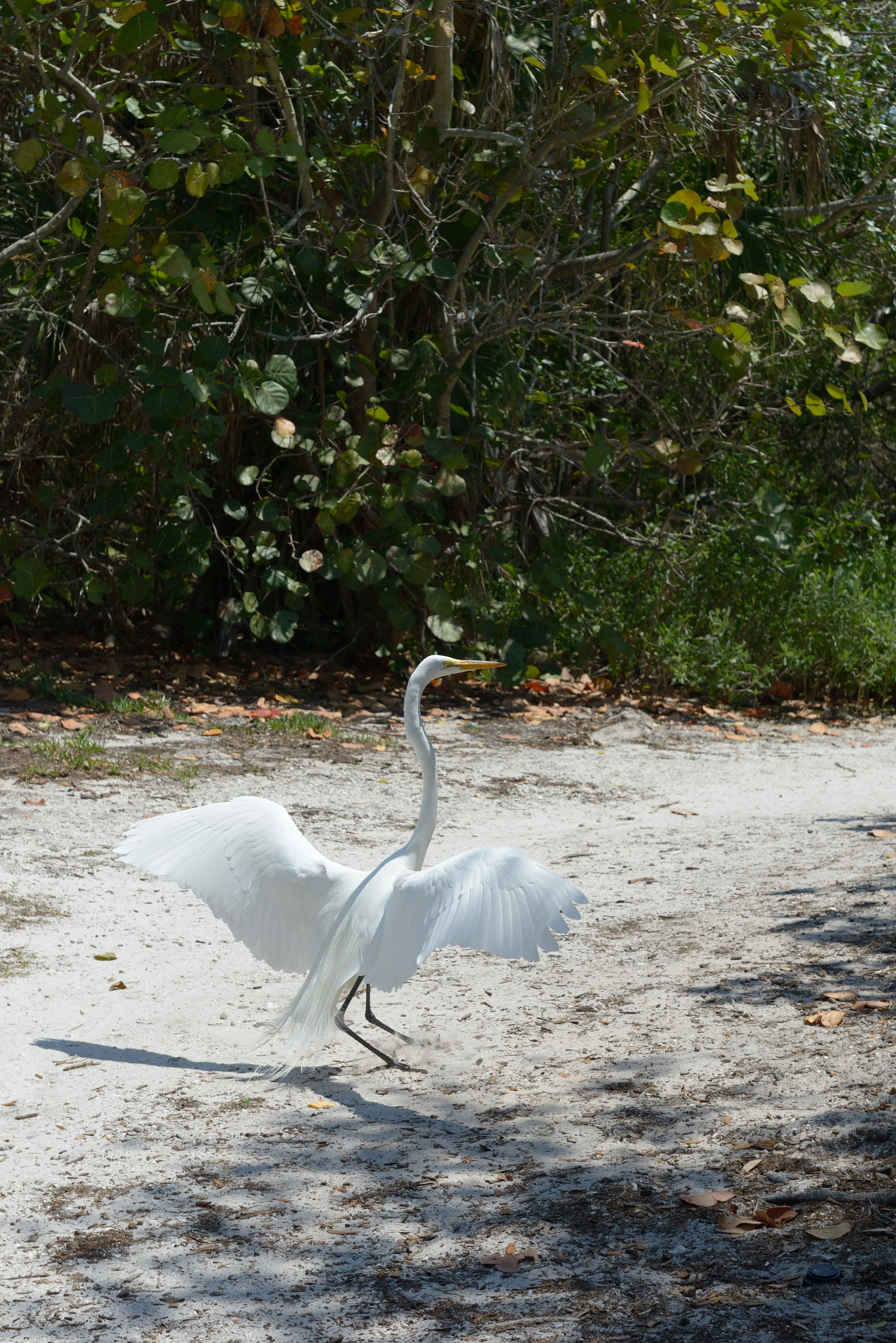
White heron in the Durante Community Park on Longboat Key

According to the United States Census Bureau, the town has a total area of 16.0 square miles (41.4 km^{2}), of which 4.1 square miles (10.7 km^{2}) is land and 11.9 square miles (30.7 km^{2}), or 74.19%, of which is water.

Longboat Key is located north of St. Armands Key, with its circle of shopping and dining, and Lido Key, and south of Bradenton Beach, Holmes Beach, and Anna Maria, which are located on the adjacent Anna Maria Island. The nearby cities of Sarasota and Bradenton and the Sarasota–Bradenton International Airport rounds out Longboat Key's varied list of geographic amenities. State Road 789 (Gulf of Mexico Drive) runs the length of the island, with ancillary boulevards branching off to residential neighborhoods. From some locations one can see both Sarasota Bay and the Gulf of Mexico.

At other points the island widens and accommodates various homes owned by both singly and in condominiums, hotels, and sports clubs. Some Longboat Key residents are "snowbirds", who vacation at or own second homes on Longboat Key, and are present only during the winter months. Others are homesteaders, utilizing the various homestead exemptions provided to Florida citizens who own and occupy their principal residences within the state, as set forth under the Florida Constitution.

Most of the Gulf side of Longboat Key consists of beaches. The southernmost area of the key is mostly part of the Longboat Key Club.

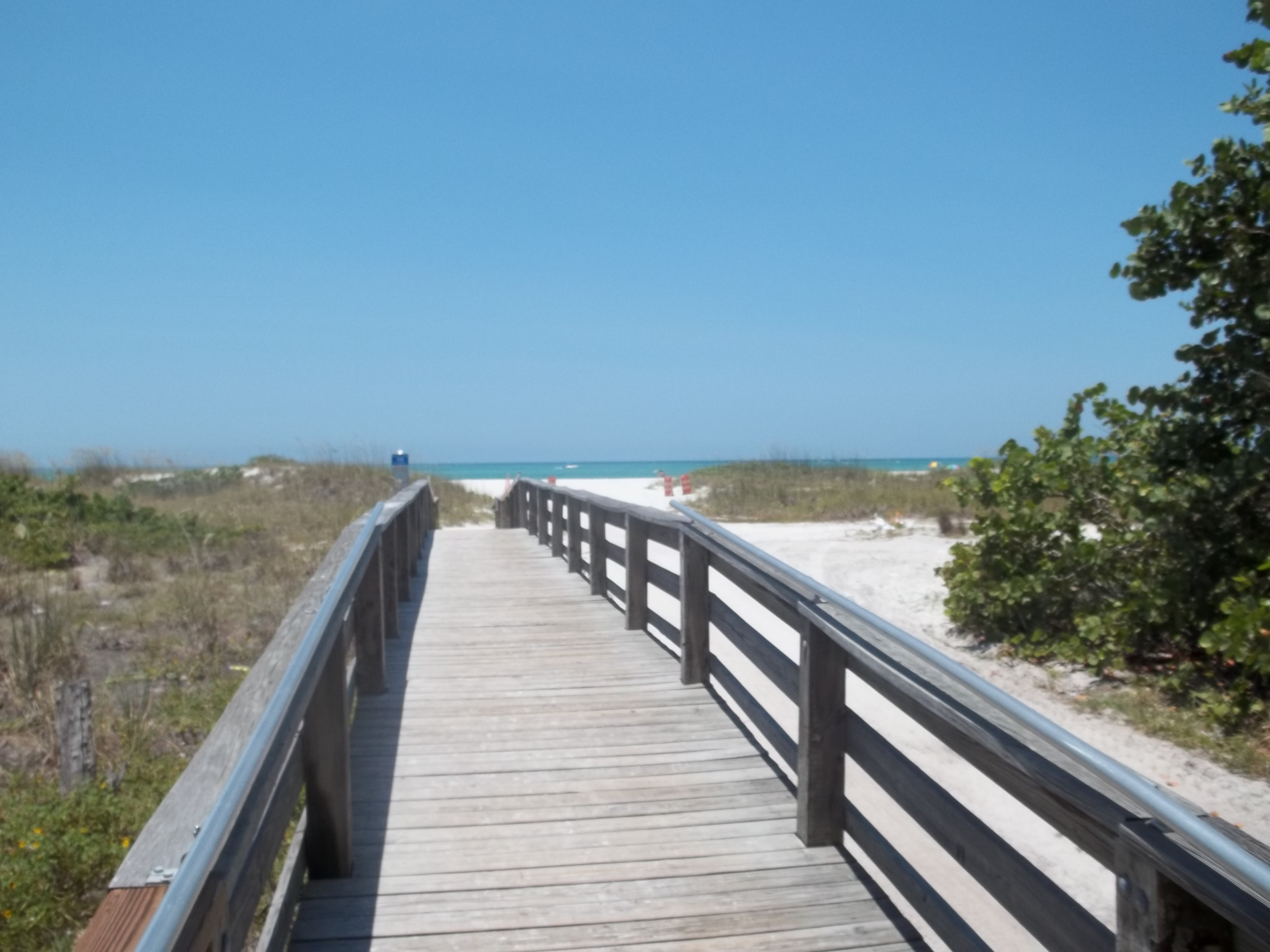
Boardwalk to beach

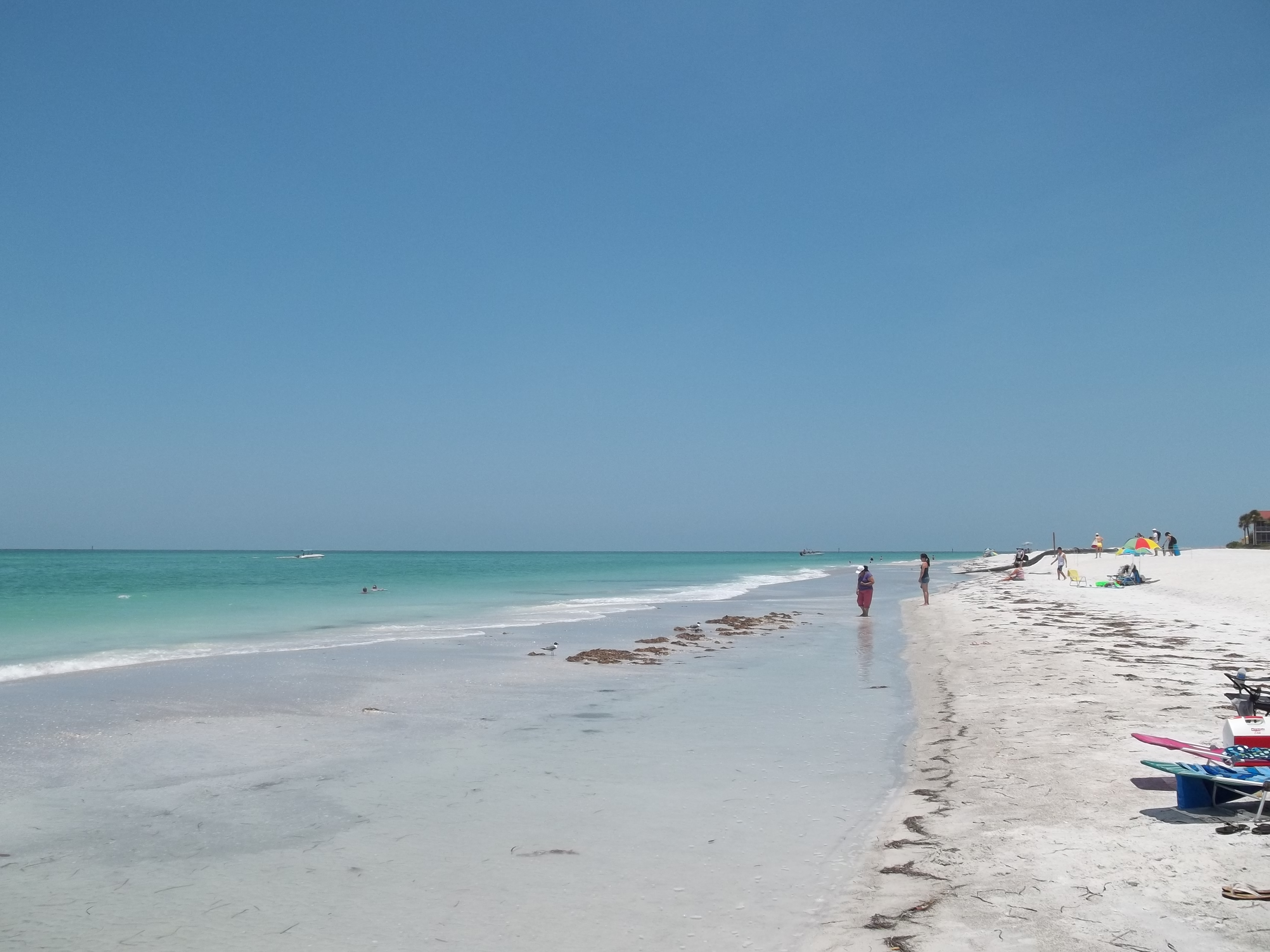
Beach on Gulf side of key

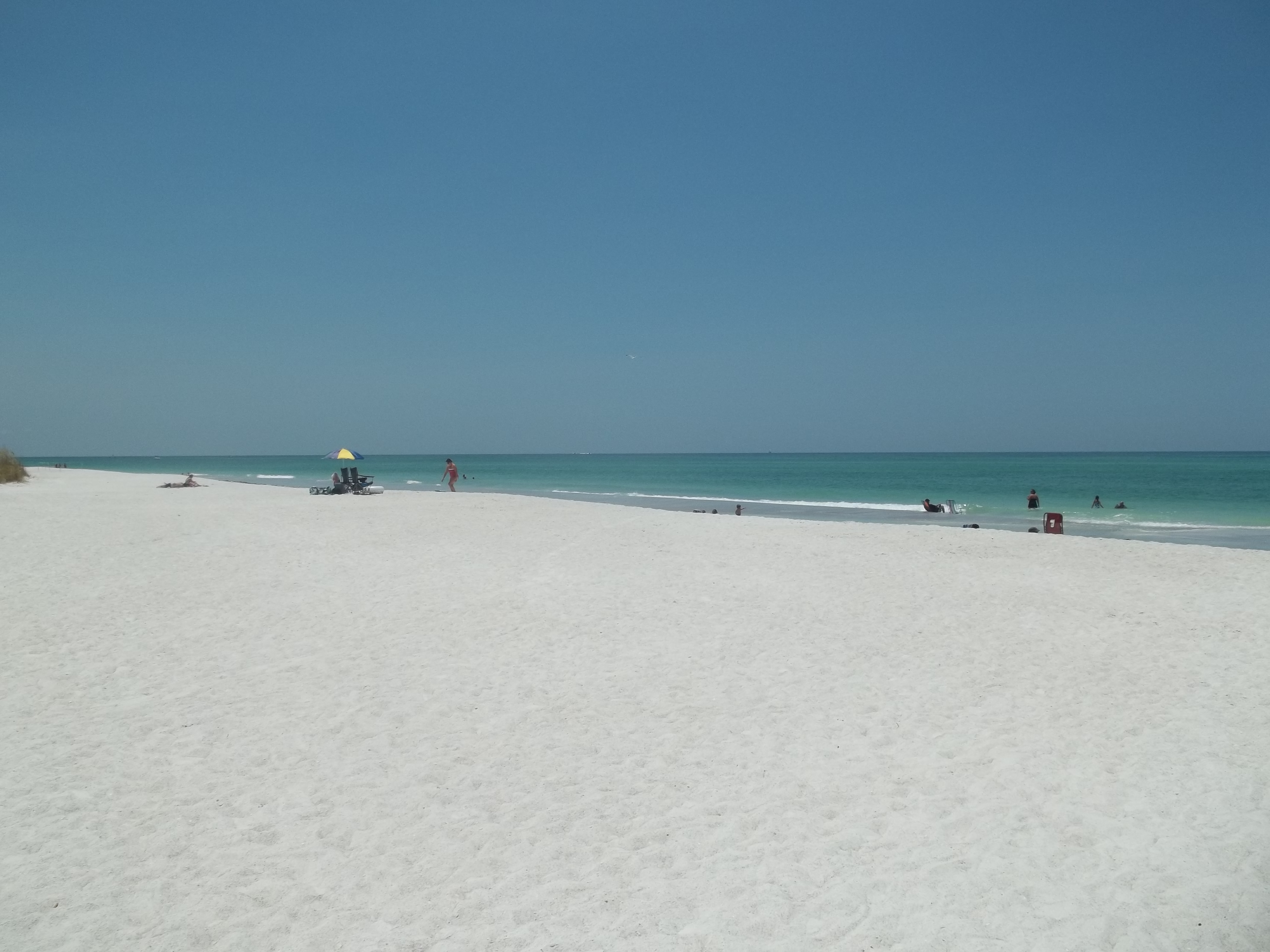
Beach expanse

=== Jewfish Key ===
Jewfish Key is an island that covers 38 acres (150,000 m^{2}) located within city limits. The island is only accessible via boat and the eastern part of the key is a nature reserve. Electricity is provided via underwater cables and there are no landline phone lines to the key. Residents of the island get water from wells and use septic tanks.

Until the 1930s, Jewfish Key was two islands: Pickett Key to the north and Fisherman's Key located to the south. When the US Army Corps of Engineers dredged the Intracoastal Waterway they needed a place to deposit the spoil; and the two owners (whose last names were Jordan and Zeisse) allowed for the spoil to be placed in order to make a single island in exchange for a deed to this now one island and "a case of whisky". The island's name comes from when local fishermen started calling the island Jewfish Key because they caught large amounts of Goliath groupers or Jewfish there.

=== Water ===
A perennial problem for Longboaters was water quantity and quality. Salinity and sedimentary factors threatened the availability of potable water to island residents, visitors, and businesses. This problem was alleviated sufficiently when the Governing Board of the Southwest Florida Water Management District approved a connection to Sarasota County's water supply, augmenting the existing connection to that of Manatee County.

== Demographics ==
Historical population
Census	Pop.	Note	%±
1960	1,000		—
1970	2,850		185.0%
1980	4,843		69.9%
1990	5,937		22.6%
2000	7,603		28.1%
2010	6,888		−9.4%
2020	7,505		9.0%
U.S. Decennial Census

=== Racial and ethnic composition ===
Longboat Key racial composition (Hispanics excluded from racial categories) (NH = Non-Hispanic)
Race	Pop. 2010	Pop. 2020	% 2010	% 2020
White (NH)	6,715	7,052	97.49%	93.96%
Black or African American (NH)	16	31	0.23%	0.41%
Native American or Alaska Native (NH)	7	15	0.10%	0.20%
Asian (NH)	51	88	0.74%	1.17%
Pacific Islander or Native Hawaiian (NH)	0	2	0.00%	0.03%
Some other race (NH)	2	22	0.03%	0.29%
Two or more races/multiracial (NH)	24	118	0.35%	1.57%
Hispanic or Latino (any race)	73	177	1.06%	2.36%
Total	6,888	7,505		

=== 2020 census ===
As of the 2020 census, Longboat Key had a population of 7,505. There were 3,992 females and 3,513 males in the town. The median age was 71.0 years overall, 71.7 for males, and 70.5 for females. 2.5% of residents were under the age of 18 and 67.4% of residents were 65 years of age or older. For every 100 females, there were 88.0 males, and for every 100 females age 18 and over there were 87.3 males age 18 and over.

99.5% of residents lived in urban areas, while 0.5% lived in rural areas.

There were 4,200 households in Longboat Key, of which 4.4% had children under the age of 18 living in them. Of all households, 61.6% were married-couple households, 11.9% were households with a male householder and no spouse or partner present, and 22.4% were households with a female householder and no spouse or partner present. About 29.6% of all households were made up of individuals and 23.3% had someone living alone who was 65 years of age or older.

There were 9,744 housing units, of which 56.9% were vacant. The homeowner vacancy rate was 2.7% and the rental vacancy rate was 52.8%. A total of 4,752 housing units (48.8%) were for seasonal, recreational, or occasional use.

=== Demographic estimates ===
According to the Census Bureau's 2020 American Community Survey 5-year estimates, there were 2,696 families residing in the town.

=== 2010 census ===
As of the 2010 United States census, there were 6,888 people, 3,780 households, and 2,595 families residing in the town.

=== 2000 census ===
As of the census of 2000, there were 7,603 people, 4,280 households, and 2,846 families residing in the town. The population density was 1,546.4 inhabitants per square mile (597.1/km^{2}). There were 8,834 housing units at an average density of 1,796.8 per square mile (693.7/km^{2}).

In 2000, the racial makeup of the town was 99.24% White, 0.07% African American, 0.08% Native American, 0.43% Asian, 0.01% Pacific Islander, 0.01% from other races, and 0.16% from two or more races. Hispanic or Latino people of any race were 0.67% of the population.

In 2000, there were 4,280 households, out of which 3.0% had children under the age of 18 living with them, 64.3% were married couples living together, 1.4% had a female householder with no husband present, and 33.5% were non-families. 30.2% of all households were made up of individuals, and 21.6% had someone living alone who was 65 years of age or older. The average household size was 1.78 and the average family size was 2.11. In the town, the population was spread out, with 2.6% under the age of 18, 0.9% from 18 to 24, 5.7% from 25 to 44, 32.4% from 45 to 64, and 58.3% who were 65 years of age or older. The median age was 68 years. For every 100 females, there were 86.8 males. For every 100 females age 18 and over, there were 86.7 males.

In 2000, the median income for a household in the town was $290,251, and the median income for a family was $307,983. Males had a median income of $261,157 versus $230,104 for females. The per capita income for the town was $280,963. About 0.4% of families and 0.9% of the population were below the poverty line, including 0.9% of those under age 18 and 1.0% of those age 65 or over.

== Government ==
The town of Longboat Key has had a commission-manager form of government since 1958. The Mayor of Longboat Key is elected for a two-year long term by the town commission consisting of seven members who serve two-year terms each. The town commission has 7 members with each member being elected to a three-year long term. Two of the members of the town commission under the town charter are elected for at-large seats.

The United States Postal Service operates a post office on Longboat Key, with the entire island having the ZIP code of 34228. The post office was established on October 10, 1907, as "Longbeach", and was located in the community of that name on the north end of the key. On February 1, 1958, the name of the Longbeach post office was changed to Longboat Key. There was also another post office named "Longboat" established on March 27, 1914, in the Sarasota County portion of the key, but it was discontinued on January 14, 1922, and its functions were assumed by the Sarasota post office.

The quasi-governmental form of the condominium association exists in one of its most complex forms in and on Longboat Key, consisting of the Federation of Longboat Key Condominiums.

Longboat Key is served by two newspapers published year-round, the Longboat Observer and the Longboat Key News.

Currently, Longboat Key is located within two Florida counties, Manatee County in the north and Sarasota County in the south. There have been calls for the Florida Legislature to pursue an initiative to create a 68th county, "Longboat Key County," to simplify governance of the island. Neither of these initiatives is likely to be passed, however. As of February 2019, Longboat Key officials had not started any comprehensive effort to put Longboat in one county or the other. Officials did, however, ask state legislators to request the Florida Legislature's OPPAGA perform an analysis of the potential benefits and drawbacks of moving into only one county.

In recent years, it has been suggested to declare Longboat Key a national seashore, a public land operated by the National Park Service.

== Education ==
The school district for portions in Manatee County is School District of Manatee County.

The school district for portions in Sarasota County is Sarasota County Schools.

== Notable people ==
- Al Arbour, four-time Stanley Cup-winning former coach, New York Islanders
- Marilyn Bendell, impressionist painter
- Lou Bender, basketball player with Columbia Lions and trial attorney
- Nick Bollettieri, founded Bradenton's Nick Bollettieri Tennis Academy
- Vern Buchanan, member of the U.S. House of Representatives for Florida's 16th congressional district, which includes Longboat Key
- Frank Swift Chase, post-impressionist painter
- Harber H. Hall (1920–2020), member of the Illinois Senate, 1973–1979; resided in Longboat Key during his retirement
- Marcella Hazan, Italian cooking instructor and cookbook author
- Tom Helmore, actor
- Audrey Hepburn, actress
- Al Hirshberg, Boston-based sportswriter
- Tony Ierulli, College football coach
- Nathan J. Kaplan, Illinois jurist and politician
- Jesse W. Markham, economist
- Charlie Maxwell, former professional baseball player for 4 teams
- Peter Mellor (born 1947), English-born American footballer and coach
- Ed Miracle, artist
- Frank Mockler, 47th governor, American Samoa
- Ronna Romney, former Michigan Republican politician and sister-in-law to Governor Mitt Romney
- Reb Wickersham, racing driver

== See also ==
- Rufus P. Jordan House
