= WDDV =

WDDV may refer to:

- WDDV (AM), a defunct radio station (590 AM) formerly licensed to serve Panama City, Florida, United States
- WDIZ (AM), a radio station (1320 AM) licensed to serve Venice, Florida, which held the call sign WDDV from 2005 to 2020
- WCTQ, a radio station (92.1 FM) licensed to serve Venice, Florida, which held the call sign WDDV from 1999 to 2005
