= Cortez, Florida =

- Census-designated place
- Location in Manatee County and the state of Florida
- Coordinates: 27°28′00″N 82°40′08″W
- Country: United States
- State: Florida
- County: Manatee
- Established: 1892

Area
  - Total: 5.11 sq mi (13.24 km^{2})
  - Land: 2.23 sq mi (5.78 km^{2})
  - Water: 2.88 sq mi (7.46 km^{2})
- Elevation: 3 ft (0.91 m)

Population (2020)
  - Total: 4,121
  - Density: 1,847.3/sq mi (713.24/km^{2})
- Time zone: UTC-5 (Eastern (EST))
  - Summer (DST): UTC-4 (EDT)
- ZIP codes: 34215 (Cortez); 34210 (Bradenton)
- Area code: 941
- FIPS code: 12-14700
- GNIS feature ID: 2402798

Cortez, a census-designated place (CDP) in Manatee County, Florida, United States, is a small Gulf Coast commercial fishing village that was founded by settlers from North Carolina in the 1880s. The population was 4,121 at the 2020 census, down from 4,241 at the 2010 census. It is part of the North Port-Bradenton-Sarasota, Florida Metropolitan Statistical Area.

== History ==
=== Early history ===
Present-day Cortez was a part of the Safety Harbor culture region from about 900 CE until the 1700s. The Safety Harbor culture people formed chiefdoms and villages along the shoreline of Tampa Bay and the adjacent Gulf of Mexico coast. Safety Harbor culture is defined by the presence of Safety Harbor ceramics in burial mounds, which have been excavated from nearby archaeological sites in present-day Manatee County. The Safety Harbor culture virtually disappeared due to disease and incursions by other Native Americans.

The Calusa people, often referred to as the "Shell Indians", also inhabited the southwest coast of Florida. The Calusa were first recorded by Spanish explorers in 1513, but were likely living on the coast long before they were recorded doing so. The Calusa became the dominant power in the Tampa Bay area with the waning of the Safety Harbor Culture in the 1600s. The Calusa are believed to have stayed in the area until 1763 when the remaining Calusa, their numbers having already dwindled due to disease and warfare, left Florida to settle in Cuba. The Calusa are believed to have lived along inner waterways in homes built on stilts. Unlike many other tribes, the Calusa did not hunt but rather fished for subsistence. The Calusa people were prolific fishermen. The Calusa people made nets from palm tree webbing in order to catch mullet, pin-fish, pig-fish, and catfish. They used spears topped with arrowheads crafted from fish teeth and spines in order to hunt eels and turtles. Women and children of the tribe caught shellfish, including crabs, lobsters, oysters, clams, and conch. They used the shells they collected to make a variety of things such as tools, utensils, ornaments, weapons, and jewelry. The eventual demise of the Calusa people is attributed to invasions from other tribes and disease brought by Spanish and French explorers.

Cuban fishermen began journeying northward in order to fish the waters of the Gulf Coast of Florida around the mid-1700s. Once the journey to Florida had been made, the fishermen would set up temporary camps called ranchos where they would reside for around half a year while they fished the plentiful waters of the area. Catches were dried and salted so that they could be transported back to Cuba to be sold. This proved effective as the fishermen would return home before Lent to sell their catch when fish was in high demand. The waters surrounding Cuba are viable fishing waters, but they were fished heavily. The waters near the Gulf Coast of Florida were particularly appealing to the ranchos because there were not yet any permanent settlements in the area. This means that the water in the area was an untapped resource of fish, all theirs for the taking. This area was made all the more appealing because its environment was conducive to inshore net fishing (the preferred method of the Spanish Cuban fishermen).

=== Founding and 19th century ===
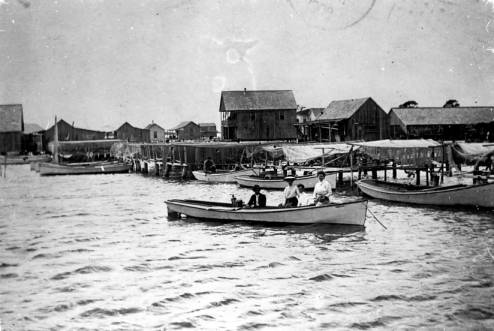
The E. P. Green family is boating on Sarasota Bay in front of the Cortez waterfront in the early 1900s. Photo courtesy of Manatee County Public Library System.

Originally called "Hunter's Point", Cortez was settled in the 1880s by families from Carteret County, North Carolina. When a post office was established in 1888, the village needed a new name to avoid confusion with another Hunter's Point in Florida. Although the origins of the name "Cortez" cannot be officially proven, the community may have been named after the Spanish conquistador Hernán Cortés. In its early days, Cortez was a fishing village so rural that it was more often reached by water than by land. The mainstay of Cortez was and still is its success in the commercial fishing industry.

==== The 1890 Bratton/Burton Store ====
The first commercial building in Cortez was built by William C. Bratton in the 1890s. This building helped to connect Cortez with the outside world. The Bratton/Burton Store housed the post office, general store, and steamboat wharf. About a decade after its original construction, construction on rooms began in order to expand it into the Albion Inn. The Albion Inn along with the 1912 school house were some of the only buildings on the waterfront to survive the hurricane of 1921. The Inn eventually closed and was sold to the U.S. Coast Guard. The Bratton/Burton Store served as U.S. Coast Guard Station Cortez from 1974 until 1991 - when it was slated for demolition. Cortez residents came together to save the Bratton/Burton Store portion of the building from demolition. In 2006, it was moved to the grounds of the Florida Maritime Museum.

=== Cortez in the 20th century ===
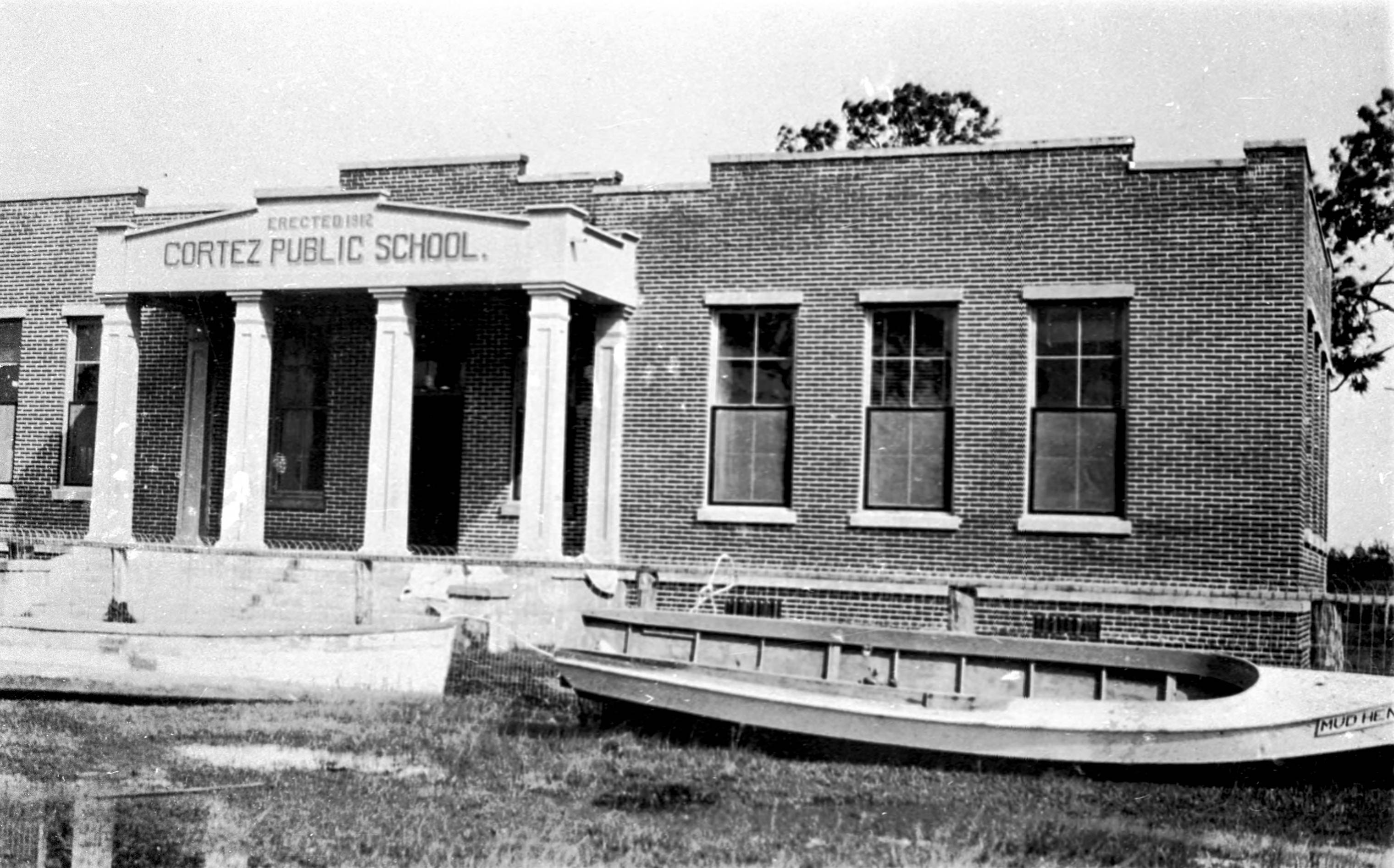
Some boats landed in front of the Cortez Rural Graded Schoolhouse after the Hurricane of 1921. Photo courtesy of Manatee County Public Library System.

==== 1912 Rural Graded Schoolhouse ====
Prior to 1912, the young children of Cortez were educated in a one-room, wood schoolhouse. In 1912, the one-room schoolhouse was replaced with a larger, brick one referred to as the Cortez Rural Graded Schoolhouse. The Cortez Mother's Club played a large part in the construction and success of the new schoolhouse. The building became a community hub for Cortez and provided shelter for many during the hurricane of 1921. The schoolhouse was first build with three classrooms, but in 1933 one of the classrooms was extended to serve as an auditorium. This building was used as a school for the children of Cortez until 1961. An art school then leased the building before being sold to weaver Robert Sailors in 1974. Sailors used the schoolhouse as his home and studio. After his death, Manatee County purchased the schoolhouse and began the process of restoring it in 1999. In 2006, the schoolhouse was reopened as a museum. Today, the Cortez Rural Graded Schoolhouse houses the Florida Maritime Museum.

==== World War One ====
When the United States entered World War I in 1917, residents served in a variety of capacities. Ten residents are known to have served, with eight going into the US Army and two into the US Navy.

==== Building of the Cortez Bridge ====
Construction on the Cortez Bridge connecting Anna Maria Island to Cortez began in 1921. Anna Maria Island was not connected to the mainland prior to this and so could only be accessed by boat. Construction on the bridge came to a halt after the hurricane of 1921 hit, destroying any progress that had been made on the bridge. In 1922, construction began again and the wooden bridge was completed. The wooden bridge connected Cortez Road to Bradenton Beach's Bridge Street. In the 1950s, the wooden Cortez Bridge was replaced with the current concrete bridge. To prove how stable the new bridge was, elephants from Ringling Circus were brought over and paraded across the bridge for all to see.

==== The hurricane of 1921 ====
In October 1921, Cortez was unexpectedly and brutally hit by a hurricane estimated to have been either a category three or four. The hurricane of 1921 was reportedly the most damaging to hit the Tampa Bay area since the mid-1800s. The people of Cortez had little to no warning that the storm was coming before it hit, so they took refuge in the 1912 Rural Graded Schoolhouse. The hurricane of 1921 almost completely destroyed the waterfront. Leaving few structures standing, the waterfront had to be rebuilt and is now barely recognizable from what it once was.

==== Roaring Twenties and Great Depression ====
During the 1920s many new changes would come to the village of Cortez. For the first time ever shipments of seafood were delivered by road as residents got cars. Electricity would also become common in the village reducing much of the work load.

Cortez during the Great Depression was notably one of the only communities in the United States not to receive federal aid.

==== World War Two ====
As with all other areas of the country, Cortez was greatly impacted by World War II. Most men in Cortez went to war whether they enlisted or were drafted, and those that enlisted largely did so in the U.S. Navy or Coast Guard, as sailing was their way of life. Many women also went off to war, to serve as nurses and medical personnel. Those left behind during the war effort worked to ensure the survival of Cortez and its fishing industry. Although fishing prior to WWII was seen as a family business, with most of the young men and many of the women of Cortez gone workers were hired from outside of the family. Women and young girls began working and fishing for seventy five cents an hour to support their families and fill in for the men.

== Geography ==
Cortez is located in western Manatee County. The village of Cortez stands at the west end of a peninsula bordered by Anna Maria Sound to the west, Palma Sola Bay to the north, and Sarasota Bay to the south. The Cortez census-designated place includes the village, plus the remainder of the peninsula to the east, as far as 86th Street.

Florida State Road 684 is the main road through the community, leading east 7 miles (11 km) to South Bradenton and west across Anna Maria Sound to Bradenton Beach.

According to the United States Census Bureau, the Cortez CDP has a total area of 5.1 square miles (13 km^{2}), of which 2.2 square miles (5.7 km^{2}) are land and 2.9 square miles (7.5 km^{2}), or 56.37%, are water.

Cortez is located in a safe harbor, sheltered from harsh winds by Anna Maria Island and Longboat Key (two of Florida's barrier islands).

== Demographics ==
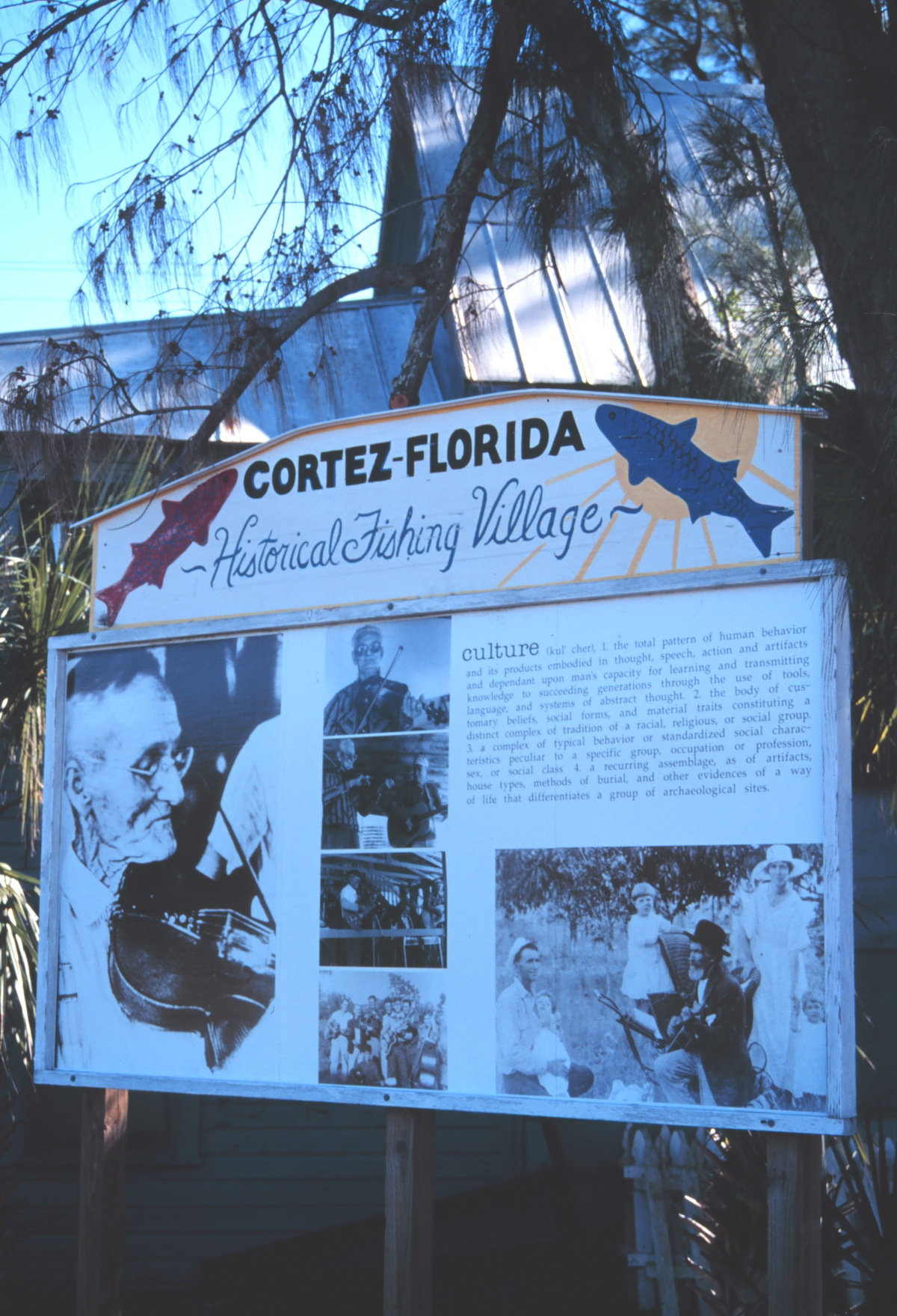
Historic fishing village of Cortez

Historical population
Census	Pop.	Note	%±
1980	3,821		—
1990	4,509		18.0%
2000	4,491		−0.4%
2010	4,241		−5.6%
2020	4,121		−2.8%

=== 2020 census ===
As of the 2020 census, Cortez had a population of 4,121. The median age was 65.9 years. 6.0% of residents were under the age of 18 and 52.3% of residents were 65 years of age or older. For every 100 females there were 92.8 males, and for every 100 females age 18 and over there were 92.4 males age 18 and over.

99.0% of residents lived in urban areas, while 1.0% lived in rural areas.

There were 2,255 households in Cortez, of which 7.8% had children under the age of 18 living in them. Of all households, 48.8% were married-couple households, 19.0% were households with a male householder and no spouse or partner present, and 25.4% were households with a female householder and no spouse or partner present. About 36.1% of all households were made up of individuals and 24.9% had someone living alone who was 65 years of age or older.

There were 4,001 housing units, of which 43.6% were vacant. The homeowner vacancy rate was 1.9% and the rental vacancy rate was 22.9%.

Racial composition as of the 2020 census
Race	Number	Percent
White	3,796	92.1%
Black or African American	31	0.8%
American Indian and Alaska Native	11	0.3%
Asian	31	0.8%
Native Hawaiian and Other Pacific Islander	5	0.1%
Some other race	36	0.9%
Two or more races	211	5.1%
Hispanic or Latino (of any race)	182	4.4%

=== 2000 census ===
As of the 2000 census, there were 4,491 people, 2,373 households, and 1,468 families residing in the CDP. The population density was 2,047.7 inhabitants per square mile (790.6/km^{2}). There were 3,308 housing units at an average density of 1,508.3 per square mile (582.4/km^{2}). The racial makeup of the CDP was 98.33% White, 0.16% African American, 0.20% Native American, 0.53% Asian, 0.16% from other races, and 0.62% from two or more races. Hispanic or Latino of any race were 1.31% of the population.

There were 2,373 households, out of which 9.4% had children under the age of 18 living with them, 56.1% were married couples living together, 3.4% had a female householder with no husband present, and 38.1% were non-families. 31.9% of all households were made up of individuals, and 20.8% had someone living alone who was 65 years of age or older. The average household size was 1.89 and the average family size was 2.29.

In the CDP, the population was spread out, with 8.6% under the age of 18, 2.4% from 18 to 24, 13.8% from 25 to 44, 30.7% from 45 to 64, and 44.6% who were 65 years of age or older. The median age was 62 years. For every 100 females, there were 90.9 males. For every 100 females age 18 and over, there were 90.4 males.

The median income for a household in the CDP was $36,577, and the median income for a family was $48,750. Males had a median income of $32,188 versus $26,735 for females. The per capita income for the CDP was $26,476. About 7.3% of families and 9.4% of the population were below the poverty line, including 7.8% of those under age 18 and 10.1% of those age 65 or over.

== Museums and culture ==
=== Cortez Historic District ===
The Cortez Historic District is a U.S. historic district (designated as such on March 16, 1995) bounded by Cortez Road, 119th Street W, Sarasota Bay and 124th Street Court W.

=== Cortez Cultural Center ===
The Cortez Cultural Center focuses on preserving "old Florida" history and stories of founding families in Cortez. The center's exhibits start with Cortez's founding and continues onto the 1980s. Eventually, the center will document the village's history to present day.

=== Florida Institute of Saltwater Heritage ===
The Florida Institute for Saltwater Heritage (F.I.S.H.) is a non-profit, grassroots organization established in 1991. F.I.S.H. is in the process of restoring over 100 acres of environmentally sensitive land on Sarasota Bay. Each year F.I.S.H. and Cortez hosts a Commercial Fishing Festival during the 3rd weekend of February that is attended by thousands of people.

=== Florida Maritime Museum ===
The Florida Maritime Museum (FMM) is a museum, sponsored by Manatee County Clerk of Circuit Courts, located on 4 acres (1.6 ha) of land within the historic fishing village of Cortez, Florida. The museum tells a number of stories pertaining to all aspects of Florida's maritime history. Exhibits include historic photographs, boat models, tools, instruments, sea shells, and other historic artifacts. The museum is also home to a folk school that teaches traditional Florida skills and a research library with a variety of books, plans, logs, diaries, periodicals, letters, records and related archival material whose content is relevant to research concerning maritime subjects, with special emphases on Florida's Gulf Coast. The museum is housed in a 1912 schoolhouse building at the 95-acre (38 ha) Cortez Nature Preserve at 4415 119th Street West. Other historic structures located on the site include the 1890 Burton Store, a wood cistern, and the Pillsbury Boat Shop.

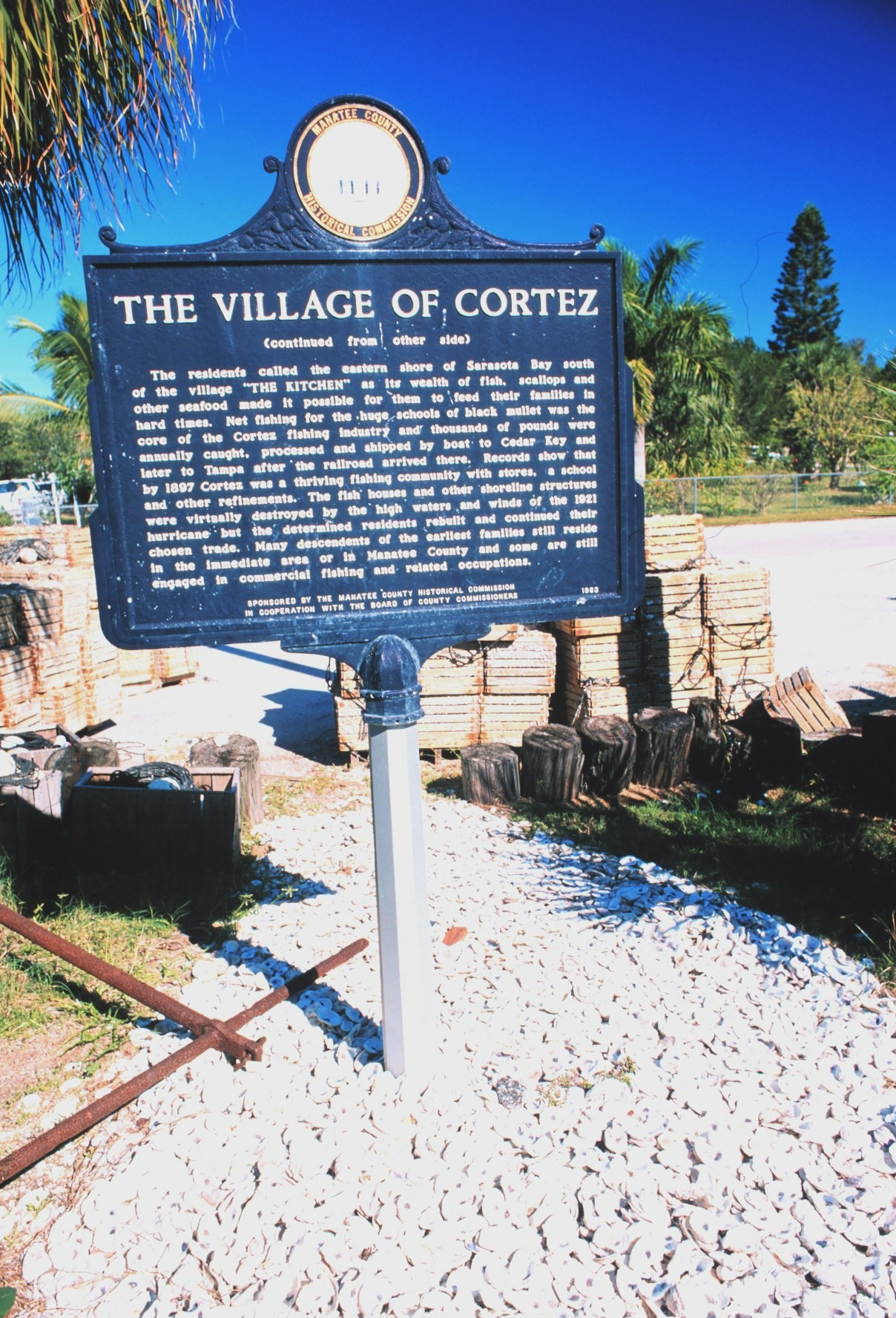
Historical marker

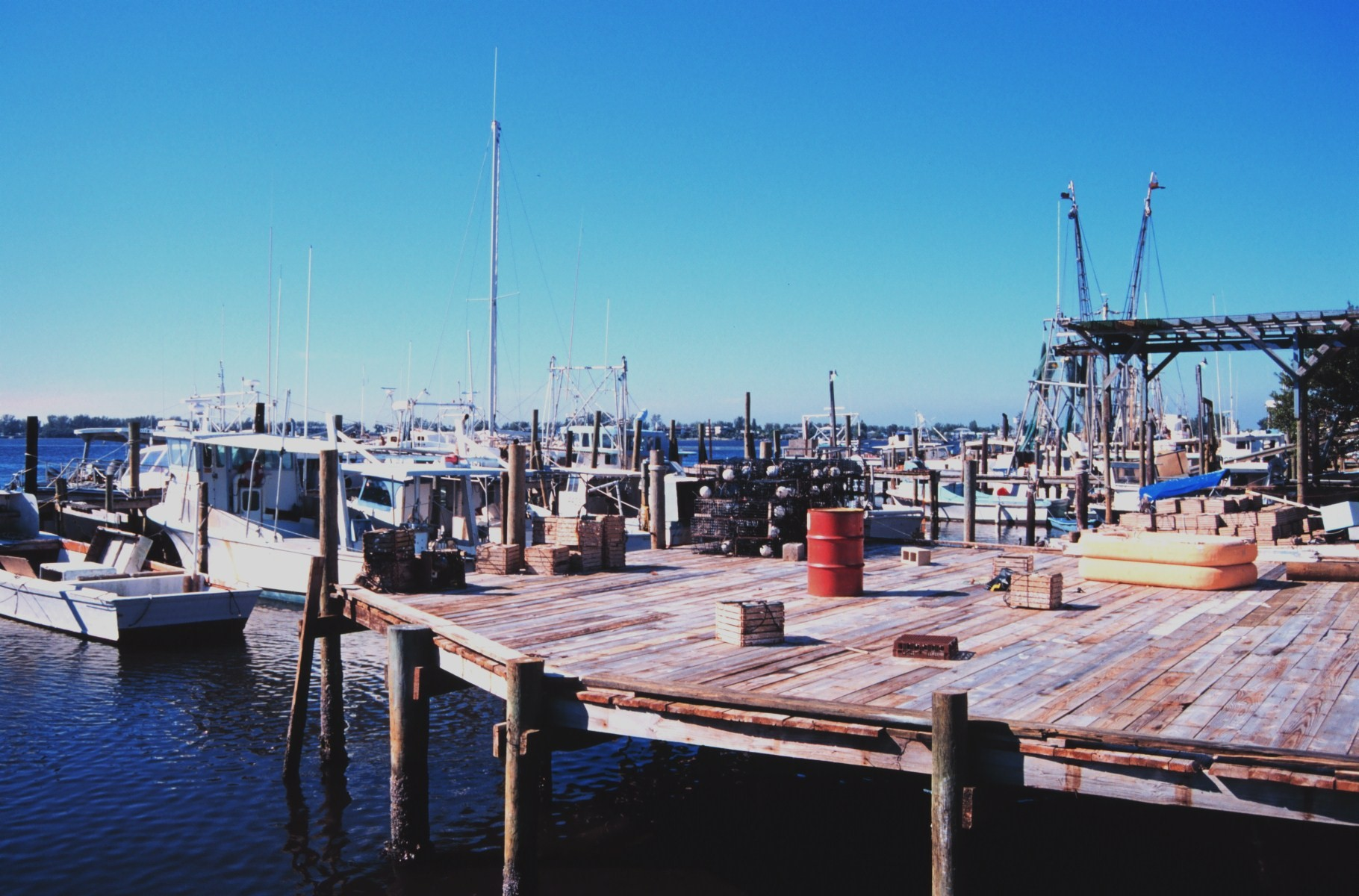
Shrimp, snapper, grouper, and stone crab fishing boats at Cortez
