= Sarasota metropolitan area =

Sarasota–Bradenton Area
- Metropolitan Statistical Area
- North Port–Bradenton–Sarasota, FL; Metropolitan Statistical Area
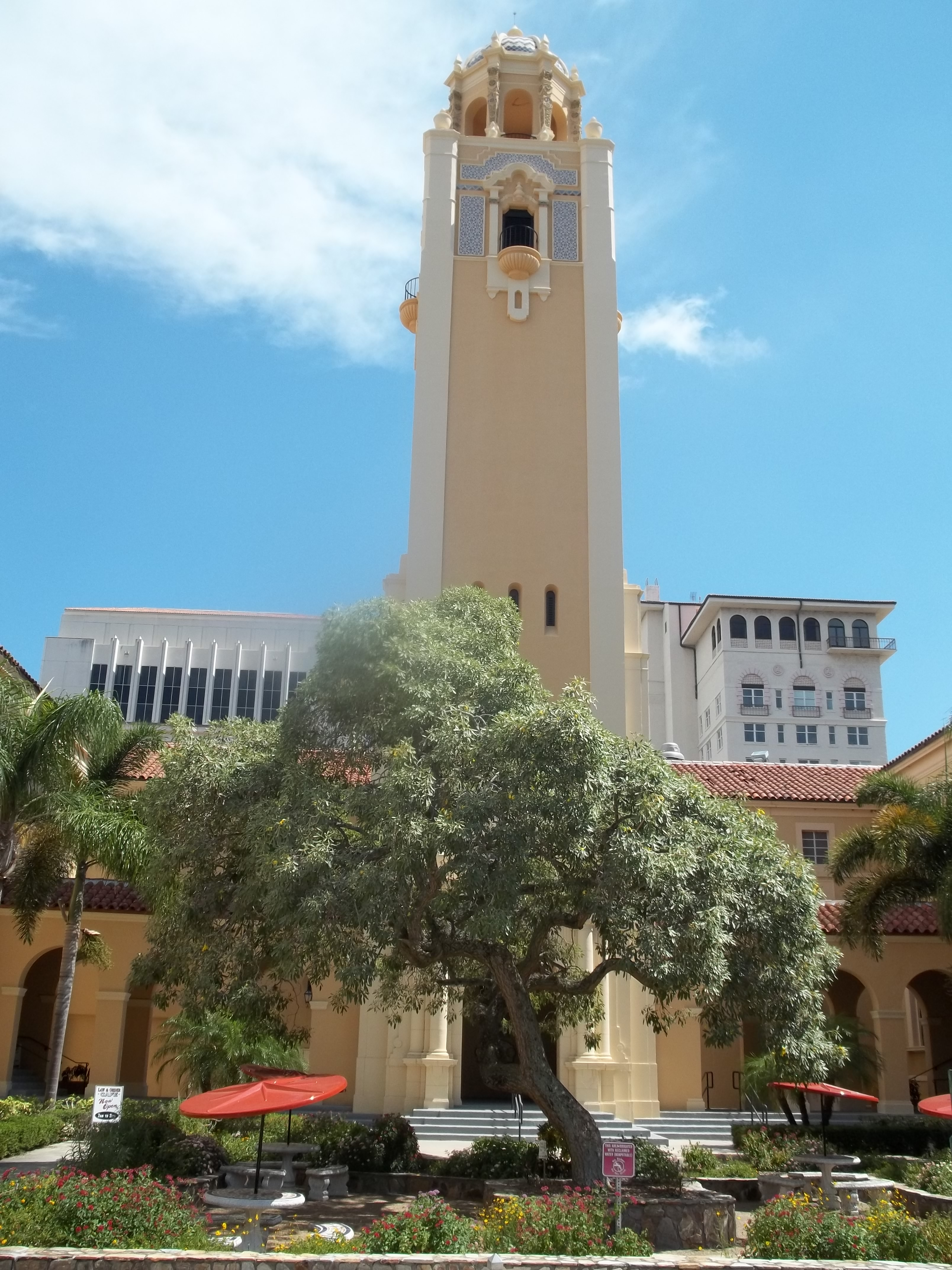
- Sarasota County Courthouse
Interactive Map of North Port–Bradenton, FL CSA
North Port–Bradenton–Sarasota, FL MSA
Punta Gorda, FL MSA
Arcadia, FL μSA
- Country: United States
- State(s): Florida
- Core city: Sarasota
- Largest city: North Port
- Other cities: Bradenton; Venice; Palmetto

Area
  - Total: 1,295.8 sq mi (3,356 km^{2})

Population (2020)
  - Total: 833,716
  - Rank: 65th in the U.S.
  - Density: 542/sq mi (209/km^{2})

GDP
  - MSA: $45.41 billion (2023)
- Time zone: UTC−05:00 (EST)
  - Summer (DST): UTC−04:00 (EDT)
- Telephone numbering plan: 239, 863, 941

The Sarasota metropolitan area is a metropolitan area located in Southwest Florida. The metropolitan area is defined by the Office of Management and Budget (OMB) as the North Port–Bradenton–Sarasota Metropolitan Statistical Area, a metropolitan statistical area (MSA) consisting of Manatee County and Sarasota County. The principal cities listed by the OMB for the MSA are North Port, Bradenton, Sarasota, Lakewood Ranch, and Venice. At the 2020 census, the MSA had a population of 833,716. The Census Bureau estimates that its population was 948,158 in 2025.

The North Port–Bradenton–Sarasota MSA is a component of the larger North Port–Bradenton Combined Statistical Area, a combined statistical area (CSA) consisting of the North Port–Bradenton–Sarasota MSA, the Punta Gorda, Florida MSA (Charlotte County), and the Arcadia, Florida, micropolitan statistical area (DeSoto County). At the 2020 census, the CSA had a population of 1,054,539. The Census Bureau estimates that its population was 1,202,448 in 2025.

== History of the metropolitan area designations ==
The Sarasota standard metropolitan statistical area (SMSA) was first defined in 1973, and included only Sarasota County. The Bradenton SMSA was defined after the 1980 United States census, and included only Manatee County. The two MSAs were combined in 1993 as the Sarasota–Bradenton metropolitan statistical area. Venice was added as a principal city after the 2000 census. In 2007, the MSA was renamed the Bradenton–Sarasota–Venice MSA because Bradenton's population then exceeded that of Sarasota. In 2009, the area was designated the North Port–Bradenton–Sarasota MSA after North Port qualified as a "principal city" under the metropolitan statistical area definition and was determined to be the largest of the area's three principal cities. In 2013, the MSA was renamed North Port–Sarasota–Bradenton metropolitan statistical area. In July 2023, the MSA was renamed to the North Port–Bradenton–Sarasota MSA, and the CSA was renamed to the North Port–Bradenton CSA. Lakewood Ranch was also added as a principal city within the MSA.

== Demographics ==
Historical population
Census	Pop.	Note	%±
1960	146,063		—
1970	217,528		48.9%
1980	350,693		61.2%
1990	489,483		39.6%
2000	589,959		20.5%
2010	702,281		19.0%
2020	833,716		18.7%
2025 (est.)	948,158		13.7%

=== Counties ===
==== Metropolitan Statistical Area ====
County	Seat	2025 estimate	2020 Census	Change	Land Area	Density
Sarasota	Sarasota	479,958	434,006	+10.59%	556 sq mi (1,440 km^{2})	863/sq mi (333/km^{2})
Manatee	Bradenton	468,200	399,710	+17.13%	743 sq mi (1,920 km^{2})	630/sq mi (243/km^{2})
Total		948,158	833,716	+13.73%	1,299 sq mi (3,360 km^{2})	730/sq mi (282/km^{2})

==== Combined Statistical Area ====
Statistical Area	2025 estimate	2020 Census	Change	Land Area	Density
North Port–Bradenton–Sarasota, FL Metropolitan Statistical Area	948,158	833,716	+13.73%	1,299 sq mi (3,360 km^{2})	730/sq mi (282/km^{2})
Punta Gorda, FL Metropolitan Statistical Area (Charlotte County)	217,212	186,847	+16.25%	680 sq mi (1,800 km^{2})	319/sq mi (123/km^{2})
Arcadia, FL Micropolitan Statistical Area (DeSoto County)	37,078	33,976	+9.13%	637 sq mi (1,650 km^{2})	58/sq mi (22/km^{2})
Total	1,202,448	1,054,539	+14.03%	2,616 sq mi (6,780 km^{2})	460/sq mi (177/km^{2})

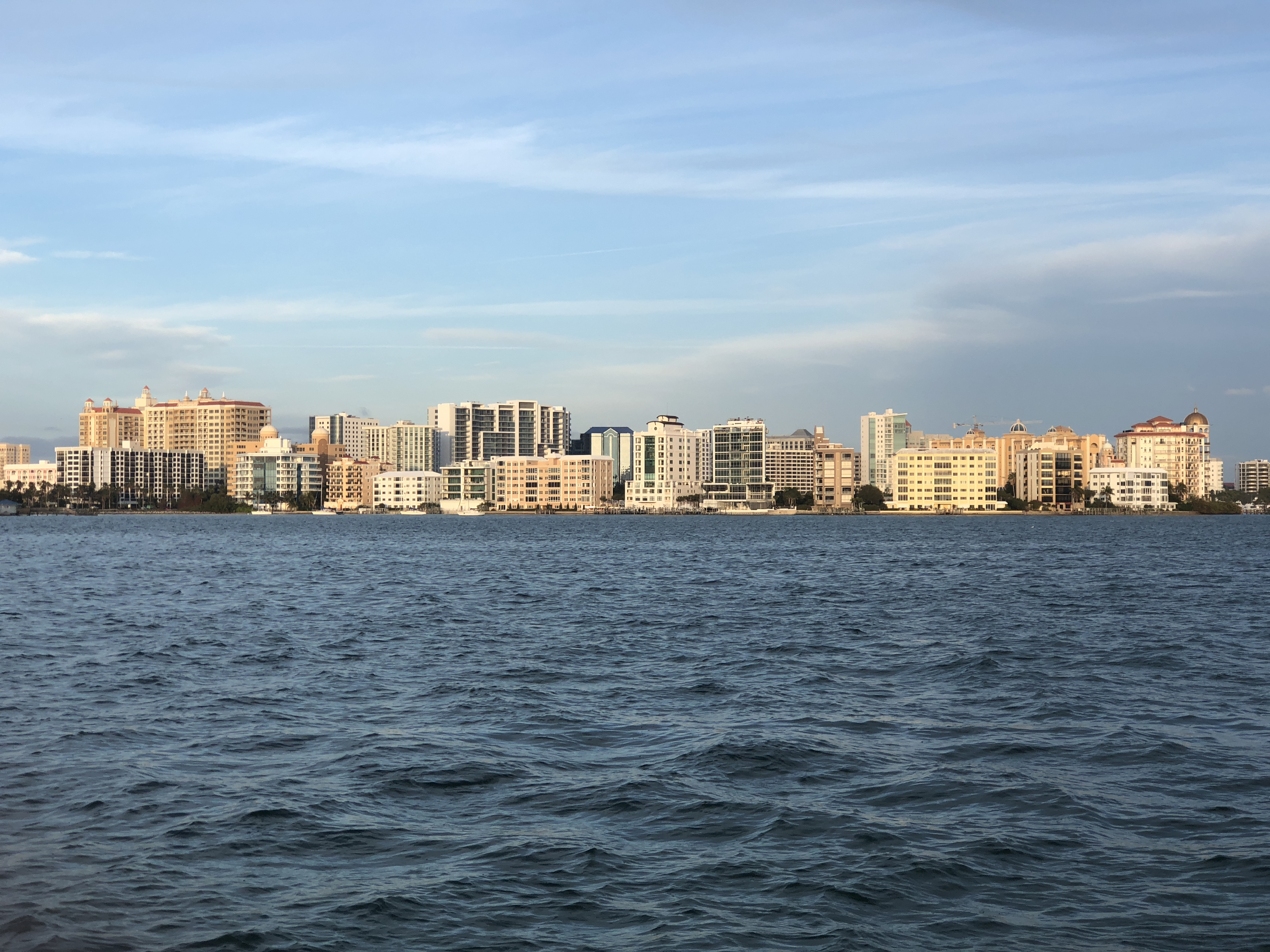
Sarasota

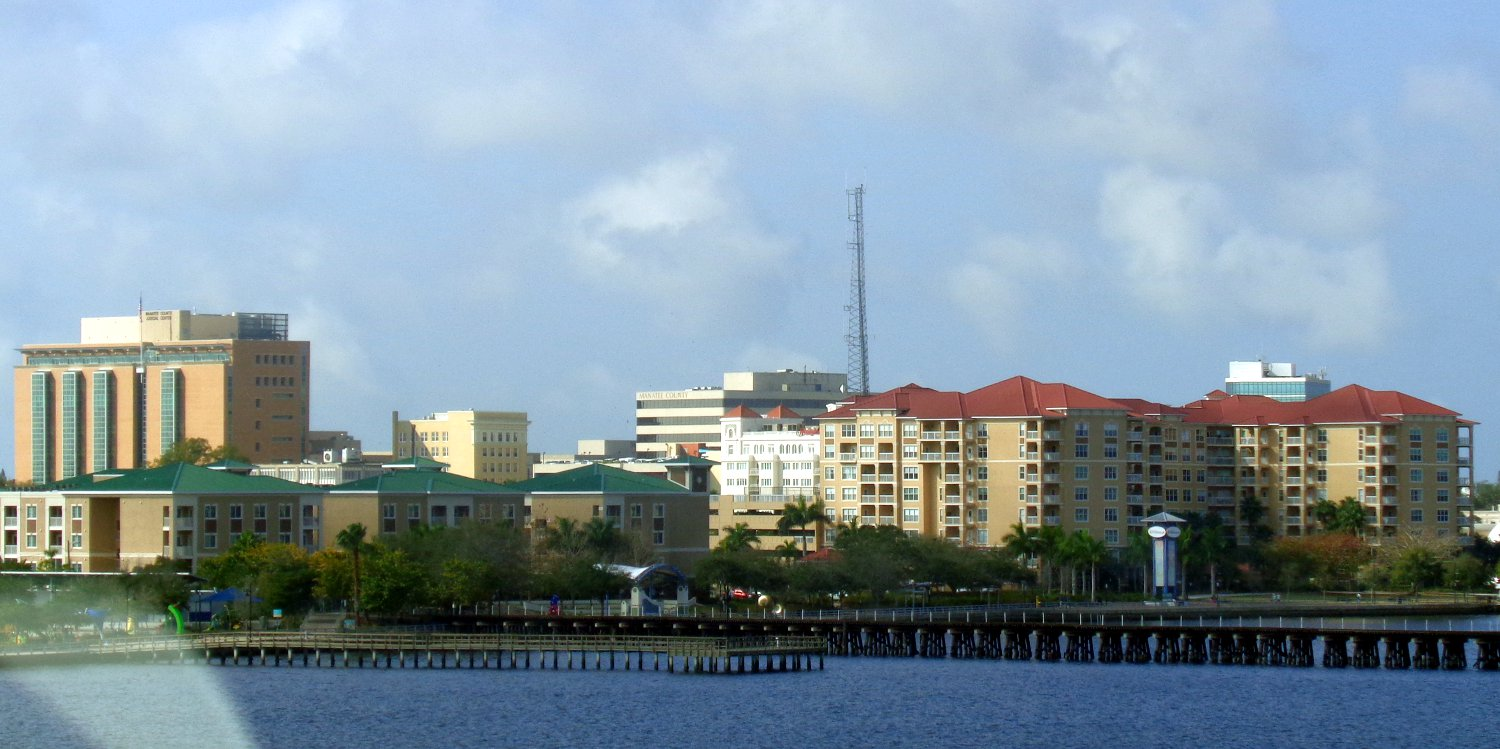
Bradenton

=== Cities ===
==== Largest cities ====
The following is a list of the five largest cities in the Sarasota metropolitan area as ranked by population.

Rank	City	County	2010 population	2020 population	2023 estimate	% change (2020 to 2023)
1	North Port	Sarasota	57,357	74,793	80,512	+7.65%
2	Bradenton	Manatee	49,546	55,698	56,289	+1.06%
3	Sarasota	Sarasota	51,917	54,842	56,218	+2.51%
4	Venice	Sarasota	20,748	25,463	26,467	+3.94%
5	Palmetto	Manatee	12,606	13,323	13,449	+0.95%

==== Other cities and towns ====
Rank	City	County	2010 population	2020 population	2023 estimate	% change (2020 to 2023)
1	Longboat Key	Sarasota; Manatee	6,888	7,052	7,512	+6.52%
2	Holmes Beach	Manatee	3,836	3,010	3,042	+1.06%
3	Anna Maria	Manatee	1,503	968	850	−12.19%
4	Bradenton Beach	Manatee	1,171	908	777	−14.43%

=== Census designated places ===
The following is a list of census-designated places (CDPs) ranked by population. CDPs in the combined statistical area are included.

Rank	CDP	County	2010 population	2017 estimated (2010 to 2017)
1	Port Charlotte	Charlotte	54,392	59,654
2	South Bradenton	Manatee	22,178	24,935
3	Bayshore Gardens	Manatee	16,323	20,047
4	Sarasota Springs	Sarasota	14,395	16,386
5	Englewood	Sarasota Charlotte	14,863	15,159
6	South Venice	Sarasota	13,949	14,535
7	Fruitville	Sarasota	13,224	13,541
8	Gulf Gate Estates	Sarasota	10,911	10,650
9	Bee Ridge	Sarasota	9,598	9,772
10	Laurel	Sarasota	8,171	9,283
11	Rotonda West	Charlotte	8,759	8,981
12	Memphis	Manatee	7,848	8,926
13	North Sarasota	Sarasota	6,982	8,728
14	Venice Gardens	Sarasota	7,104	7,904
15	Southeast Arcadia	Desoto	6,554	7,653
16	Southgate	Sarasota	7,173	7,539
17	Osprey	Sarasota	6,100	6,734
18	Siesta Key	Sarasota	6,565	5,850
19	Warm Mineral Springs	Sarasota	5,061	5,305
20	South Sarasota	Sarasota	4,950	5,265
21	Plantation	Sarasota	4,919	4,790
22	Lake Sarasota	Sarasota	4,679	4,718
23	The Meadows	Sarasota	3,994	4,383
24	Kensington Park	Sarasota	3,901	4,351
25	Vamo	Sarasota	4,727	4,345
26	Cortez	Manatee	4,241	4,332
27	West Bradenton	Manatee	4,192	4,213
28	Samoset	Manatee	3,854	3,922
29	Ridge Wood Heights	Sarasota	4,795	3,878
30	Desoto Lakes	Sarasota	3,646	3,590
31	Ellenton	Manatee	4,275	3,423
32	Harbour Heights	Charlotte	2,987	3,401
33	Nokomis	Sarasota	3,167	3,376
34	Cleveland	Charlotte	2,990	3,317
35	Whitfield	Manatee	2,882	3,215
36	Charlotte Park	Charlotte	2,325	2,058
37	Grove City	Charlotte	1,804	2,042
38	Solana	Charlotte	742	706
39	Gardner	Hardee	463	228

== Climate ==
The Sarasota metropolitan area, like most of Florida, is located in the humid subtropical zone (Köppen climate classification: Cfa), closely bordering on a tropical climate like Southern Florida, characterized by hot, humid summers with frequent afternoon thunderstorms, and relatively drier and mild winters.

== Transportation ==
=== Roads ===
==== Freeways ====
- Interstate 75
- Interstate 275

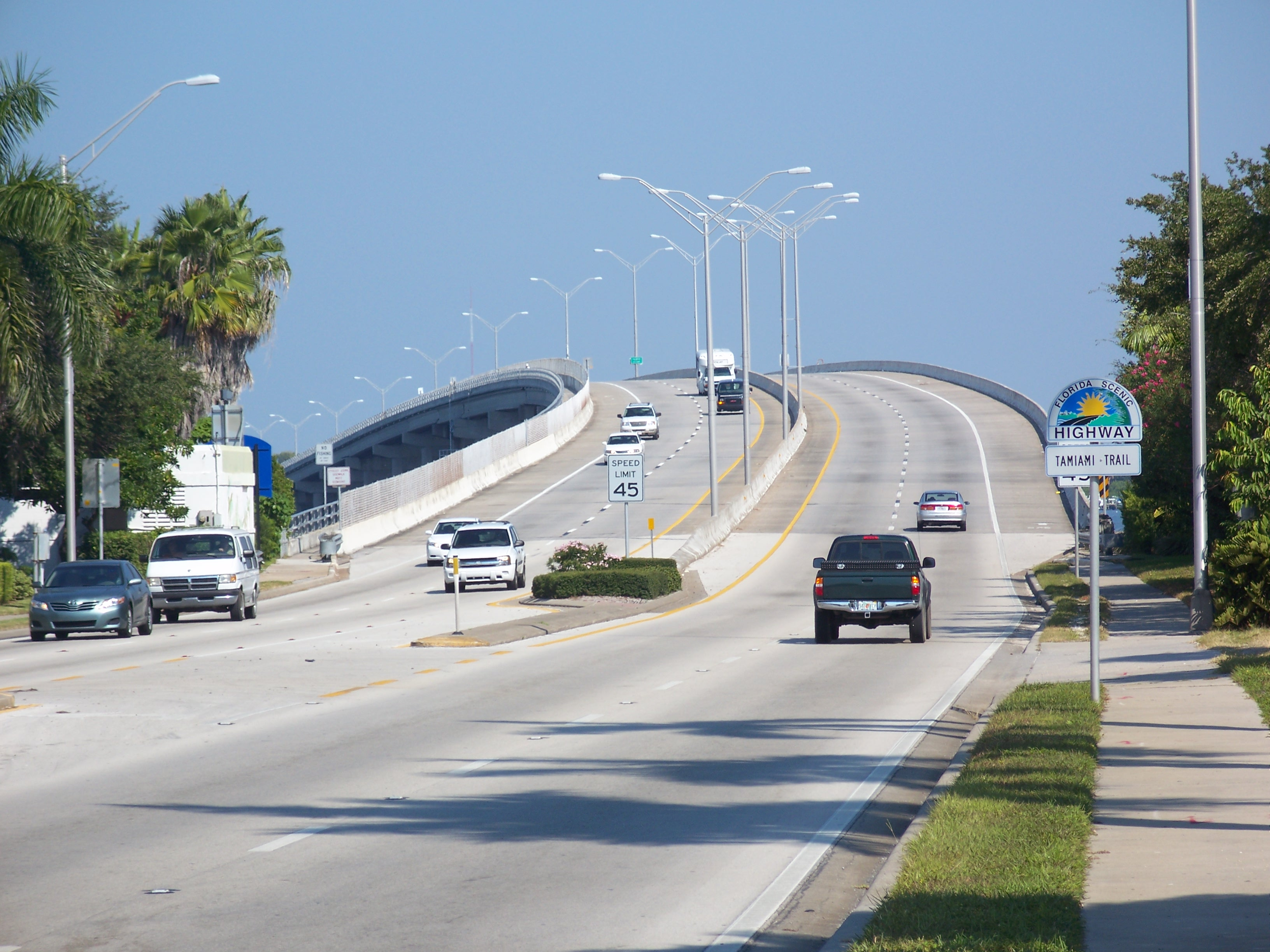
Approach to the Green Bridge in Bradenton which carries US 41 across the Manatee River.

==== U.S. highways ====
- U.S. Route 19
- U.S. Route 41
- U.S. Route 301

==== State roads ====
- State Road 37
- State Road 62
- State Road 64
- State Road 70
- State Road 72
- State Road 681
- State Road 684
- State Road 758
- State Road 776
- State Road 777
- State Road 780
- State Road 789

==== County roads ====
- List of county roads in Charlotte County, Florida
- List of county roads in DeSoto County, Florida
- List of county roads in Manatee County, Florida
- List of county roads in Sarasota County, Florida

=== Ports ===
- SeaPort Manatee

=== Airports ===
- Sarasota-Bradenton International Airport

==== Public airports ====
- Buchan Airport
- Venice Municipal Airport

=== Public transportation ===
Sarasota and Manatee counties have transit networks, Breeze Transit (formerly Sarasota County Area Transit, SCAT) and Manatee County Area Transit (MCAT), which run bus services in the area. Amtrak operates an Amtrak Thruway route through the area starting in St. Petersburg-Clearwater and ending in Fort Myers, with Sarasota and Ellenton operating as stops along the route.

== Media ==
=== Newspapers ===
- Anna Maria Island Sun
- Bradenton Herald
- Business Observer, a business newspaper published in Sarasota, serves several other regions of Florida.
- East County Observer
- Longboat Observer
- The Bradenton Times, an online newspaper.
- The Islander
- Sarasota Herald-Tribune
- Siesta Key Observer
- Sarasota Observer
- Tempo News
- Venice Gondolier Sun

=== Magazines ===
- Sarasota Magazine
- SRQ Magazine
- Venice: Gulf Coast Living Magazine

=== Television ===
- ABC 7
- WSNN (SNN)

=== Radio ===
- WBRD
- WCTQ
- WDIZ (AM)
- WHPT
- WJIS
- WKES
- WLSS
- WWNP-LP
- WRUB (FM)
- WSDV
- WSLR-LP
- WSMR (FM)
- WSRQ (AM)
- WTMY
- WWPR (AM)

== Education ==
Public education is provided by Manatee County School District and Sarasota County Public Schools.

=== Colleges and universities ===
The following college/university campuses exist in the metropolitan area.

- Asolo Conservatory for Actor Training
- East West College of Natural Medicine
- Everglades University
- Florida State University College of Medicine
- Keiser University
- LECOM
- Ringling College of Art and Design
- New College of Florida
- State College of Florida Sarasota-Manatee
- USF Sarasota-Manatee

== Economy ==
The Sarasota Metropolitan Area has a gross metropolitan product of $45.41 billion as of 2023.

== Recreation and culture ==
=== Parks/nature reserves ===
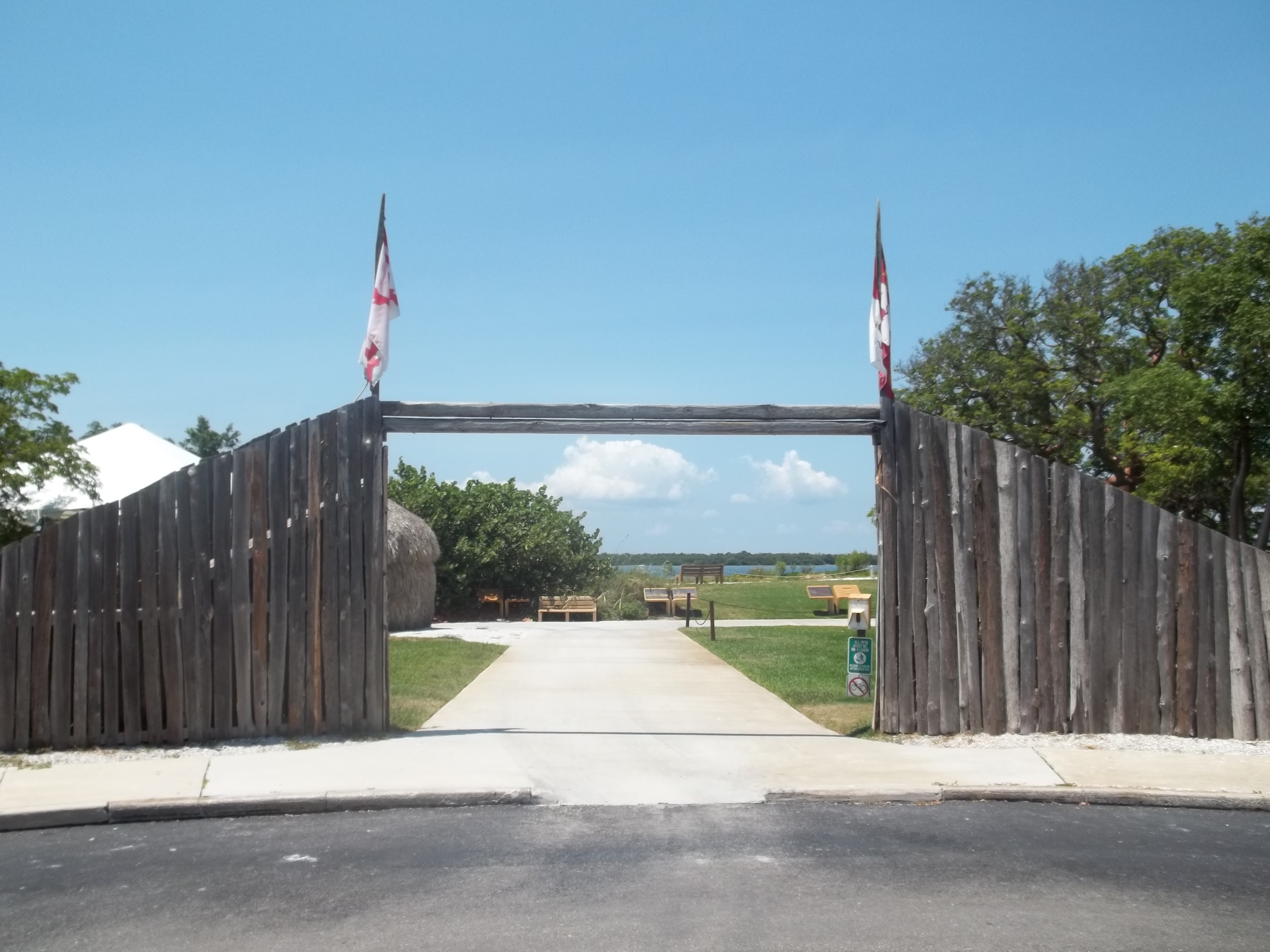
Entrance to the De Soto National Memorial.

==== Federally owned ====
- DeSoto National Memorial

==== State-owned ====
- Lake Manatee State Park
- Myakka River State Park
- Oscar Scherer State Park
- Terra Ceia Preserve

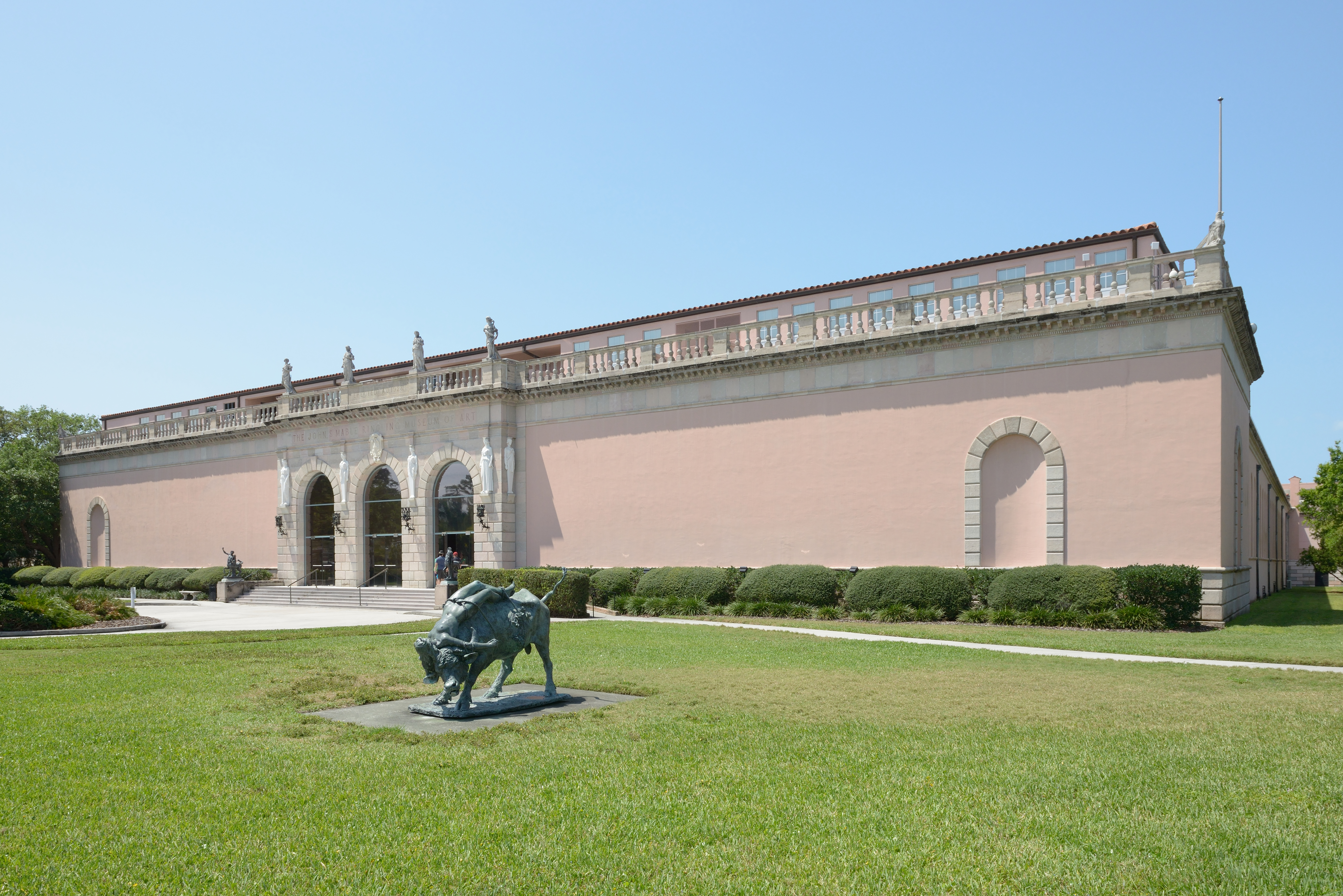
John and Mable Ringling Museum of Art, also known as The Ringling.

=== Museums ===
- Bishop Museum of Science and Nature
- Florida Maritime Museum
- Florida Railroad Museum
- John and Mable Ringling Museum of Art
- Palmetto Historical Park

=== Theatres ===
- Florida Studio Theatre
- Sarasota Opera House
- Van Wezel Performing Arts Hall

== See also ==
- Florida census statistical areas
