= WWPR =

WWPR may refer to:

- WWPR (AM), a radio station (1490 AM) licensed to Bradenton, Florida, United States
- WWPR-FM, a radio station (105.1 FM) licensed to New York, New York, United States
- WPLJ, a radio station (95.5 FM) licensed to New York, New York, United States, which held the call sign WWPR from 1987 to 1988
