= WBTP =

WBTP may refer to:

- WBTP (FM), a radio station (106.5 FM) licensed to serve Sarasota, Florida, United States
- WDAE-FM, a radio station (95.7 FM) licensed to serve Clearwater, Florida, which held the call sign WBTP from 2003 to 2024
