= West Samoset, Florida =

- Census-designated place
- Location in Manatee County and the state of Florida
- Coordinates: 27°28′13″N 82°33′19″W
- Country: United States
- State: Florida
- County: Manatee

Area
  - Total: 1.35 sq mi (3.49 km^{2})
  - Land: 1.35 sq mi (3.49 km^{2})
  - Water: 0 sq mi (0.00 km^{2})
- Elevation: 36 ft (11 m)

Population (2020)
  - Total: 6,482
  - Density: 4,813.4/sq mi (1,858.47/km^{2})
- Time zone: UTC-5 (Eastern (EST))
  - Summer (DST): UTC-4 (EDT)
- ZIP Code: 34208 (Bradenton)
- FIPS code: 12-76740
- GNIS feature ID: 2403010

West Samoset is an unincorporated area and census-designated place (CDP) in Manatee County, Florida, United States. The population was 6,482 at the 2020 census, up from 5,583 in 2010. It is part of the North Port–Bradenton–Sarasota, Florida Metropolitan Statistical Area.

== Geography ==
West Samoset is bordered to the north and northwest by the city of Bradenton, to the east by unincorporated Samoset, and to the west by unincorporated South Bradenton. U.S. Route 301 runs through the northern part of the community, while U.S. Route 41 forms the southwest border. Florida State Road 45 (1st Street) forms the western edge of the CDP.

According to the United States Census Bureau, the CDP has a total area of 1.3 square miles (3.4 km^{2}), all land.

== Demographics ==
Historical population
Census	Pop.	Note	%±
1990	3,819		—
2000	5,507		44.2%
2010	5,582		1.4%
2020	6,482		16.1%
U.S. Decennial Census

=== 2020 census ===
As of the 2020 census, West Samoset had a population of 6,482. The median age was 30.6 years. 30.6% of residents were under the age of 18 and 10.0% of residents were 65 years of age or older. For every 100 females there were 104.5 males, and for every 100 females age 18 and over there were 104.8 males age 18 and over.

100.0% of residents lived in urban areas, while 0.0% lived in rural areas.

There were 2,084 households in West Samoset, of which 41.9% had children under the age of 18 living in them. Of all households, 33.5% were married-couple households, 23.1% were households with a male householder and no spouse or partner present, and 34.4% were households with a female householder and no spouse or partner present. About 25.0% of all households were made up of individuals and 12.9% had someone living alone who was 65 years of age or older.

There were 2,281 housing units, of which 8.6% were vacant. The homeowner vacancy rate was 2.0% and the rental vacancy rate was 5.8%.

Racial composition as of the 2020 census
Race	Number	Percent
White	2,217	34.2%
Black or African American	1,366	21.1%
American Indian and Alaska Native	59	0.9%
Asian	24	0.4%
Native Hawaiian and Other Pacific Islander	3	0.0%
Some other race	1,514	23.4%
Two or more races	1,299	20.0%
Hispanic or Latino (of any race)	3,583	55.3%

=== 2000 census ===
As of the census of 2000, there were 5,507 people, 1,814 households, and 1,246 families residing in the CDP. The population density was 4,013.7 inhabitants per square mile (1,549.7/km^{2}). There were 2,065 housing units at an average density of 1,505.1 per square mile (581.1/km^{2}). The racial makeup of the CDP was 60.40% White, 27.09% African American, 0.33% Native American, 0.84% Asian, 0.02% Pacific Islander, 8.70% from other races, and 2.63% from two or more races. Hispanic or Latino of any race were 22.23% of the population.

There were 1,814 households, out of which 41.3% had children under the age of 18 living with them, 38.9% were married couples living together, 22.8% had a female householder with no husband present, and 31.3% were non-families. 23.6% of all households were made up of individuals, and 12.7% had someone living alone who was 65 years of age or older. The average household size was 2.88 and the average family size was 3.38.

In the CDP, the population was spread out, with 33.6% under the age of 18, 11.1% from 18 to 24, 28.4% from 25 to 44, 13.7% from 45 to 64, and 13.0% who were 65 years of age or older. The median age was 28 years. For every 100 females, there were 94.6 males. For every 100 females age 18 and over, there were 85.6 males.

The median income for a household in the CDP was $30,047, and the median income for a family was $31,379. Males had a median income of $22,348 versus $20,761 for females. The per capita income for the CDP was $13,027. About 17.6% of families and 18.8% of the population were below the poverty line, including 26.3% of those under age 18 and 8.5% of those age 65 or over.
