= WDIZ =

WDIZ may refer to:

- WDIZ (AM), a radio station (1320 AM) licensed to serve Venice, Florida, United States
- WDIZ (Panama City, Florida), a defunct radio station (590 AM) formerly licensed to serve Panama City, Florida, which held the call sign WDIZ from 1996 to 2020
- WRUM, a radio station (100.3 FM) licensed to serve Orlando, Florida, which held the call sign WDIZ from 1971 to 1996
