= WRUB =

WRUB may refer to:

- WDAE-FM, a radio station (95.7 FM) licensed to serve Clearwater, Florida, United States, which formerly used the callsign WRUB from 2024 to 2026
- WBTP (FM), a radio station (106.5 FM) licensed to serve Sarasota, Florida, which held the call sign WRUB from 2016 to 2024
- WRUB, a college radio station of the University at Buffalo
