= Kensington Park, Florida =

- Census-designated place
- Location in Sarasota County and the state of Florida
- Coordinates: 27°21′29″N 82°29′53″W
- Country: United States
- State: Florida
- County: Sarasota

Area
  - Total: 0.98 sq mi (2.55 km^{2})
  - Land: 0.97 sq mi (2.50 km^{2})
  - Water: 0.019 sq mi (0.05 km^{2})
- Elevation: 26 ft (7.9 m)

Population (2020)
  - Total: 3,697
  - Density: 3,823.7/sq mi (1,476.34/km^{2})
- Time zone: UTC-5 (Eastern (EST))
  - Summer (DST): UTC-4 (EDT)
- ZIP code: 34235
- Area code: 941
- FIPS code: 12-36200
- GNIS feature ID: 2403171

Kensington Park is a census-designated place (CDP) in Sarasota County, Florida, United States. The population was 3,697 at the 2020 census, down from 3,901 at the 2010 census. It is part of the North Port–Bradenton–Sarasota, Florida Metropolitan Statistical Area.

== History ==
During the post-World War II economic boom a number of new subdivisions developed up in the area surrounding Sarasota. In 1955, the Paver Construction Company, purchased over 400 acres from Charles Schmid, a local dairy farmer. Previously, the company built the Paver Park Estates subdivision. Paver Construction was started when Martin Paver, a native of New York state, along with his wife, visited Sarasota in 1949 and liked it so much that he decided to move there and get into real estate development. He also got his two sons involved. Construction would begin in 1956 and had 1,400 homes in it when fully completed. The name of the subdivision comes from where the Pavers had lived at in Great Neck, New York.

By 1960, Kensington Park also had a 14 acre Swim & Country Club that included an Olympic swimming pool, shuffleboard courts, gardens, tennis courts, picnic areas and an 8,400 square foot main building with "air-conditioned clubrooms", an auditorium, and theatre stage with professional lighting/ sound equipment. By 1969, only 20% of the households in Kensington Park were paying the $100 per year membership fee, thus operating it at a loss. Even though a majority of residents presented a bill proposing a $50 per household annual fee for all Kensington Park residents to use the facilities, the Sarasota County Commission rejected the proposal. Two months later, Kensington Park offered the facility to the YMCA free of charge and it became the Kensington Park YMCA

Kensington Park was unique for being the first sustainable community to ever be built in Southwestern Florida. Another fact that would make the subdivision unique was how the utilities would work. The utilities would be in the hands of the subdivision but each person who owned property would have a share of ownership in it. Purchasing a home would help pay for its installation and maintenance. In 1958, Kensington Park started its own sewer and water system at rates lower than the City of Sarasota.

== Geography ==
According to the United States Census Bureau, the CDP has a total area of 1.3 square miles (3.4 km^{2}), of which 1.3 square miles (3.3 km^{2}) is land and 0.039 square miles (0.1 km^{2}), or 3.76%, is water.

== Demographics ==
Historical population
Census	Pop.	Note	%±
1960	2,969		—
1970	3,138		5.7%
1980	2,887		−8.0%
1990	3,026		4.8%
2000	3,720		22.9%
2010	3,901		4.9%
2020	3,697		−5.2%

=== 2020 census ===
As of the 2020 census, Kensington Park had a population of 3,697. The median age was 43.0 years. 20.4% of residents were under the age of 18 and 17.8% of residents were 65 years of age or older. For every 100 females there were 101.7 males, and for every 100 females age 18 and over there were 100.3 males age 18 and over.

100.0% of residents lived in urban areas, while 0.0% lived in rural areas.

There were 1,383 households in Kensington Park, of which 28.2% had children under the age of 18 living in them. Of all households, 45.0% were married-couple households, 18.6% were households with a male householder and no spouse or partner present, and 26.6% were households with a female householder and no spouse or partner present. About 26.8% of all households were made up of individuals and 14.1% had someone living alone who was 65 years of age or older.

There were 1,494 housing units, of which 7.4% were vacant. The homeowner vacancy rate was 2.7% and the rental vacancy rate was 3.8%.

Racial composition as of the 2020 census
Race	Number	Percent
White	2,046	55.3%
Black or African American	209	5.7%
American Indian and Alaska Native	28	0.8%
Asian	65	1.8%
Native Hawaiian and Other Pacific Islander	1	0.0%
Some other race	469	12.7%
Two or more races	879	23.8%
Hispanic or Latino (of any race)	1,537	41.6%

=== 2010 census ===
In 2010 Kensington Park had a population of 3,901. The racial and ethnic makeup of the population was 92.6% white, 7.1% African American, 0.5% Native American, 1.7% Asian, 5.4% some other race, and 2.7% from two or more races. Hispanic or Latino persons of any race made up 1% of the population.

=== 2000 census ===
As of the 2000 census, there were 3,720 people, 1,567 households, and 1,024 families residing in the CDP. The population density was 2,765.2 inhabitants per square mile (1,067.6/km^{2}). There were 1,669 housing units at an average density of 1,240.6 per square mile (479.0/km^{2}). The racial makeup of the CDP was 96.24% White, 5.77% African American, 0.15% Native American, 1.30% Asian, 0.05% Pacific Islander, 3.87% from other races, and 1.51% from two or more races. Hispanic or Latino of any race were 1.54% of the population.

There were 1,567 households, out of which 25.4% had children under the age of 18 living with them, 50.5% were married couples living together, 11.0% had a female householder with no husband present, and 34.6% were non-families. 27.2% of all households were made up of individuals, and 15.3% had someone living alone who was 65 years of age or older. The average household size was 2.37 and the average family size was 2.88.

In the CDP, the population was spread out, with 21.6% under the age of 18, 5.2% from 18 to 24, 28.6% from 25 to 44, 22.2% from 45 to 64, and 22.4% who were 65 years of age or older. The median age was 41 years. For every 100 females, there were 90.6 males. For every 100 females age 18 and over, there were 86.9 males.

The median income for a household in the CDP was $41,090, and the median income for a family was $48,981. Males had a median income of $29,235 versus $27,950 for females. The per capita income for the CDP was $21,990. About 6.2% of families and 10.0% of the population were below the poverty line, including 14.9% of those under age 18 and 7.2% of those age 65 or over.
