= North Sarasota, Florida =

- Census-designated place
- Location in Sarasota County and the state of Florida
- Coordinates: 27°21′33″N 82°31′16″W
- Country: United States
- State: Florida
- County: Sarasota

Area
  - Total: 0.83 sq mi (2.14 km^{2})
  - Land: 0.82 sq mi (2.13 km^{2})
  - Water: 0.0077 sq mi (0.02 km^{2})
- Elevation: 33 ft (10 m)

Population (2020)
  - Total: 2,418
  - Density: 2,944.9/sq mi (1,137.04/km^{2})
- Time zone: UTC-5 (Eastern (EST))
  - Summer (DST): UTC-4 (EDT)
- Area code: 941
- FIPS code: 12-49787
- GNIS feature ID: 2403354

North Sarasota is a census-designated place (CDP) in Sarasota County, Florida, United States. The population was 2,418 at the 2020 census, down from 6,982 at the 2010 census. It is part of the North Port–Bradenton–Sarasota, Florida Metropolitan Statistical Area.

== Geography ==
According to the United States Census Bureau, the CDP has a total area of 3.8 square miles (9.8 km^{2}), of which 3.7 square miles (9.5 km^{2}) is land and 0.12 square miles (0.3 km^{2}), or 3.22%, is water.

== Demographics ==
Historical population
Census	Pop.	Note	%±
1970	1,737		—
1980	4,997		187.7%
1990	6,702		34.1%
2000	6,738		0.5%
2010	6,982		3.6%
2020	2,418		−65.4%

=== 2020 census ===
As of the 2020 census, North Sarasota had a population of 2,418. The median age was 35.6 years. 26.3% of residents were under the age of 18 and 13.5% of residents were 65 years of age or older. For every 100 females there were 87.4 males, and for every 100 females age 18 and over there were 84.8 males age 18 and over.

100.0% of residents lived in urban areas, while 0.0% lived in rural areas.

There were 782 households in North Sarasota, of which 35.9% had children under the age of 18 living in them. Of all households, 31.6% were married-couple households, 13.2% were households with a male householder and no spouse or partner present, and 45.8% were households with a female householder and no spouse or partner present. About 22.0% of all households were made up of individuals and 8.5% had someone living alone who was 65 years of age or older.

There were 877 housing units, of which 10.8% were vacant. The homeowner vacancy rate was 3.0% and the rental vacancy rate was 9.1%.

Racial composition as of the 2020 census
Race	Number	Percent
White	413	17.1%
Black or African American	1,350	55.8%
American Indian and Alaska Native	9	0.4%
Asian	22	0.9%
Native Hawaiian and Other Pacific Islander	2	0.1%
Some other race	301	12.4%
Two or more races	321	13.3%
Hispanic or Latino (of any race)	597	24.7%

=== 2000 census ===
As of the census of 2000, there were 6,738 people, 2,770 households, and 1,792 families residing in the CDP. The population density was 1,781.2 inhabitants per square mile (687.7/km^{2}). There were 3,209 housing units at an average density of 848.3 units per square mile (327.5 units/km^{2}). The racial makeup of the CDP was 63.86% White, 30.74% African American, 0.27% Native American, 0.49% Asian, 0.03% Pacific Islander, 2.97% from other races, and 1.65% from two or more races. Hispanic or Latino of any race were 8.77% of the population.

There were 2,770 households, out of which 23.4% had children under the age of 18 living with them, 44.9% were married couples living together, 15.1% had a female householder with no husband present, and 35.3% were non-families. 27.4% of all households were made up of individuals, and 14.4% had someone living alone who was 65 years of age or older. The average household size was 2.43 and the average family size was 2.94.

In the CDP, the population was spread out, with 22.1% under the age of 18, 7.0% from 18 to 24, 24.3% from 25 to 44, 23.7% from 45 to 64, and 22.8% who were 65 years of age or older. The median age was 43 years. For every 100 females, there were 92.0 males. For every 100 females age 18 and over, there were 86.2 males.

The median income for a household in the CDP was $33,084, and the median income for a family was $36,629. Males had a median income of $26,383 versus $21,505 for females. The per capita income for the CDP was $17,643. About 13.8% of families and 17.2% of the population were below the poverty line, including 32.0% of those under age 18 and 9.8% of those age 65 or over.
