= Venice Gardens, Florida =

- Census-designated place
- Location in Sarasota County and the state of Florida
- Coordinates: 27°04′26″N 82°24′45″W
- Country: United States
- State: Florida
- County: Sarasota

Area
  - Total: 1.03 sq mi (2.68 km^{2})
  - Land: 0.92 sq mi (2.39 km^{2})
  - Water: 0.11 sq mi (0.28 km^{2})
- Elevation: 16 ft (4.9 m)

Population (2020)
  - Total: 3,402
  - Density: 3,679.3/sq mi (1,420.58/km^{2})
- Time zone: UTC-5 (Eastern (EST))
  - Summer (DST): UTC-4 (EDT)
- ZIP code: 34293
- Area code: 941
- FIPS code: 12-73950
- GNIS feature ID: 2402964

Venice Gardens is a census-designated place (CDP) in Sarasota County, Florida, United States. The population was 3,402 at the 2020 census, down from 7,104 at the 2010 census. It is part of the North Port–Bradenton–Sarasota, Florida Metropolitan Statistical Area.

== Geography ==
According to the United States Census Bureau, the CDP has a total area of 2.7 square miles (7.0 km^{2}), of which 2.4 square miles (6.3 km^{2}) is land and 0.27 square miles (0.7 km^{2}), or 10.01%, is water.

== Demographics ==
Historical population
Census	Pop.	Note	%±
1980	6,568		—
1990	7,701		17.3%
2000	7,466		−3.1%
2010	7,104		−4.8%
2020	3,402		−52.1%

=== 2020 census ===
As of the 2020 census, Venice Gardens had a population of 3,402. The median age was 55.5 years. 15.2% of residents were under the age of 18 and 32.6% of residents were 65 years of age or older. For every 100 females there were 85.6 males, and for every 100 females age 18 and over there were 81.6 males age 18 and over.

100.0% of residents lived in urban areas, while 0.0% lived in rural areas.

There were 1,522 households in Venice Gardens, of which 18.3% had children under the age of 18 living in them. Of all households, 45.2% were married-couple households, 17.2% were households with a male householder and no spouse or partner present, and 29.5% were households with a female householder and no spouse or partner present. About 28.8% of all households were made up of individuals and 18.2% had someone living alone who was 65 years of age or older.

There were 1,715 housing units, of which 11.3% were vacant. The homeowner vacancy rate was 2.5% and the rental vacancy rate was 8.6%.

Racial composition as of the 2020 census
Race	Number	Percent
White	2,951	86.7%
Black or African American	28	0.8%
American Indian and Alaska Native	18	0.5%
Asian	92	2.7%
Native Hawaiian and Other Pacific Islander	0	0.0%
Some other race	70	2.1%
Two or more races	243	7.1%
Hispanic or Latino (of any race)	258	7.6%

=== 2000 census ===
As of the 2000 census, there were 7,466 people, 3,528 households, and 2,342 families residing in the CDP. The population density was 2,987.9 inhabitants per square mile (1,153.6/km^{2}). There were 3,836 housing units at an average density of 1,535.2 per square mile (592.7/km^{2}). The racial makeup of the CDP was 97.43% White, 0.40% African American, 0.08% Native American, 1.25% Asian, 0.15% from other races, and 0.70% from two or more races. Hispanic or Latino of any race were 1.34% of the population.

There were 3,528 households, out of which 16.8% had children under the age of 18 living with them, 55.7% were married couples living together, 8.1% had a female householder with no husband present, and 33.6% were non-families. 28.4% of all households were made up of individuals, and 19.4% had someone living alone who was 65 years of age or older. The average household size was 2.12 and the average family size was 2.52.

In the CDP, the population was spread out, with 14.5% under the age of 18, 3.9% from 18 to 24, 19.1% from 25 to 44, 25.3% from 45 to 64, and 37.2% who were 65 years of age or older. The median age was 55 years. For every 100 females, there were 86.4 males. For every 100 females age 18 and over, there were 84.2 males.

The median income for a household in the CDP was $38,807, and the median income for a family was $45,911. Males had a median income of $28,790 versus $26,000 for females. The per capita income for the CDP was $21,440. About 3.3% of families and 5.8% of the population were below the poverty line, including 14.9% of those under age 18 and 2.8% of those age 65 or over.
