= Samoset, Florida =

- Census-designated place
- Location in Manatee County and the state of Florida
- Coordinates: 27°28′35″N 82°32′35″W
- Country: United States
- State: Florida
- County: Manatee

Area
  - Total: 1.47 sq mi (3.81 km^{2})
  - Land: 1.47 sq mi (3.81 km^{2})
  - Water: 0 sq mi (0.00 km^{2})
- Elevation: 26 ft (7.9 m)

Population (2020)
  - Total: 4,146
  - Density: 2,816.4/sq mi (1,087.43/km^{2})
- Time zone: UTC-5 (Eastern (EST))
  - Summer (DST): UTC-4 (EDT)
- ZIP code: 34208 (Bradenton)
- Area code: 941
- FIPS code: 12-63225
- GNIS feature ID: 2402819

Samoset is an unincorporated community and census-designated place (CDP) in Manatee County, Florida, United States. The population was 4,146 at the 2020 census, up from 3,854 in 2010. It is part of the North Port–Bradenton–Sarasota, Florida Metropolitan Statistical Area.

== History ==
Samoset was incorporated as a city in September 1926, and had a reported population of 1,034. The name may have come from Samoset, an Algonquin Indian, but a newspaper article at the time reported that the township was named for a flag station of the Atlantic Coast Line Railroad. The new city's seal consisted of an Indian head, a palm tree, and the year 1926, all surrounded by the name "Samoset" and Florida at the bottom. There were a few subdivisions that were developed before the incorporation, consisting of Listville, Hill Park, and Pinecrest, all of which were consolidated into the new city of Samoset.

William A. Thomas built the new community's first general store, a two-story brick building, in 1925. The original boundaries of the township ran south from the Bradenton city limits to present-day Cortez Road along 1st Street and a mile east of old Bradenton-Sarasota Road. The city of Manatee bordered it on the north, but it merged with Bradenton in 1944 and is now known as East Bradenton. Manatee's original borders ran from 1st Street to Braden River.

Early pioneers Thomas, George, and Luke Wyatt, and Eva Felts secured the installation of power lines from Southern Power Company. Upon incorporation, R.R. Rodeman, a developer, was elected the town's first mayor. G.L. Bryant was made city clerk, W.W. Fry town marshal, and Claud Schafer, George Wyatt, W.D. Thomas, C.A. Bingham, and E.F. Staples made up the city council. New mayor Rodeman was the developer of the above-mentioned subdivisions as well as that of Sunshine Ridge. Within days of the town's incorporation, a group of 20 residents organized in a bid to dissolve the new incorporation, but the move failed.

Meanwhile, a new school opened in October 1926, and had an enrollment of 30 children and was housed in the community hall. A teacher, Mrs. Charles Bingham, taught second and third grades. Another teacher, Mrs. Gladys La Croix, instructed 55 more children in the primary room (probably kindergarten and first grades). In March 1927, a post office opened and city clerk Joseph E. Bryant was made postmaster, and a stand-alone building was subsequently constructed. A new church, Missionary Baptist, was founded in May of that year and consisted of 20 parishioners.

In August 1927, Samoset residents' election was held, and S. Ed Curry succeeded outgoing mayor R.R. Rodeman, while J.M.Haynes and W.D. Thomas were elected to city council. In addition, E.B. Johnson was elected city clerk and F.A. Schmacher was marshal. In June 1928, another move to abolish the new town failed and the town continued on, until December when the move to abolish the town finally went through by a vote of 115 to 31. After the dissolution, the area returned to unincorporated, rural status.

== Geography ==
Samoset is bordered to the north by the city of Bradenton and to the west by unincorporated West Samoset.

U.S. Route 301 passes through the center of the community, leading northwest into Bradenton and south 10 miles (16 km) to Sarasota.

According to the United States Census Bureau, the Samoset CDP has a total area of 1.5 square miles (3.9 km^{2}), all land.

=== Climate ===
Climate is characterized by relatively high temperatures and evenly distributed precipitation throughout the year. The Köppen Climate Classification subtype for this climate is "Cfa" (Humid Subtropical Climate).

Climate data for Samoset, Florida
Month	Jan	Feb	Mar	Apr	May	Jun	Jul	Aug	Sep	Oct	Nov	Dec	Year
Mean daily maximum °C (°F)	22 (72)	23 (74)	25 (77)	28 (82)	31 (87)	32 (90)	33 (91)	33 (91)	32 (90)	29 (85)	27 (80)	23 (74)	28 (83)
Mean daily minimum °C (°F)	10 (50)	11 (51)	13 (56)	16 (60)	19 (66)	22 (71)	23 (73)	23 (73)	22 (72)	18 (65)	14 (58)	11 (52)	17 (62)
Average precipitation mm (inches)	71 (2.8)	64 (2.5)	86 (3.4)	46 (1.8)	71 (2.8)	200 (8)	220 (8.8)	240 (9.6)	190 (7.4)	71 (2.8)	51 (2)	58 (2.3)	1,370 (54.1)
Source: Weatherbase

== Demographics ==
Historical population
Census	Pop.	Note	%±
1950	1,617		—
1960	4,824		198.3%
1970	4,070		−15.6%
1980	5,747		41.2%
1990	3,119		−45.7%
2000	3,440		10.3%
2010	3,854		12.0%
2020	4,146		7.6%

=== 2020 census ===
As of the 2020 census, Samoset had a population of 4,146. The median age was 33.8 years. 28.1% of residents were under the age of 18 and 13.4% of residents were 65 years of age or older. For every 100 females there were 92.6 males, and for every 100 females age 18 and over there were 88.9 males age 18 and over.

100.0% of residents lived in urban areas, while 0.0% lived in rural areas.

There were 1,263 households in Samoset, of which 39.9% had children under the age of 18 living in them. Of all households, 40.5% were married-couple households, 16.3% were households with a male householder and no spouse or partner present, and 33.0% were households with a female householder and no spouse or partner present. About 22.2% of all households were made up of individuals and 9.5% had someone living alone who was 65 years of age or older.

There were 1,341 housing units, of which 5.8% were vacant. The homeowner vacancy rate was 0.8% and the rental vacancy rate was 3.8%.

Racial composition as of the 2020 census
Race	Number	Percent
White	1,568	37.8%
Black or African American	811	19.6%
American Indian and Alaska Native	48	1.2%
Asian	39	0.9%
Native Hawaiian and Other Pacific Islander	6	0.1%
Some other race	835	20.1%
Two or more races	839	20.2%
Hispanic or Latino (of any race)	1,965	47.4%

=== 2000 census ===
As of the census of 2000, there were 3,440 people, 1,114 households, and 817 families residing in the CDP. The population density was 1,785.1 inhabitants per square mile (689.2/km^{2}). There were 1,179 housing units at an average density of 611.8 per square mile (236.2/km^{2}). The racial makeup of the CDP was 63.02% White, 26.51% African American, 0.38% Native American, 0.12% Asian, 0.03% Pacific Islander, 7.33% from other races, and 2.62% from two or more races. Hispanic or Latino of any race were 17.67% of the population.

There were 1,114 households, out of which 38.3% had children under the age of 18 living with them, 47.1% were married couples living together, 18.6% had a female householder with no husband present, and 26.6% were non-families. 21.3% of all households were made up of individuals, and 8.2% had someone living alone who was 65 years of age or older. The average household size was 3.06 and the average family size was 3.50.

In the CDP, the population was spread out, with 32.1% under the age of 18, 9.6% from 18 to 24, 29.8% from 25 to 44, 19.5% from 45 to 64, and 9.0% who were 65 years of age or older. The median age was 32 years. For every 100 females, there were 98.0 males. For every 100 females age 18 and over, there were 93.0 males.

The median income for a household in the CDP was $29,962, and the median income for a family was $32,700. Males had a median income of $27,044 versus $22,147 for females. The per capita income for the CDP was $10,915. About 18.1% of families and 22.5% of the population were below the poverty line, including 32.1% of those under age 18 and 24.5% of those age 65 or over.
