= Florida Maritime Museum =

- Location within Florida
- Location: 4415 119th Street West; Cortez, Florida
- Coordinates: 27.46774°N 82.68075°W
- Type: Maritime museum
- Website: floridamaritimemuseum.org

The Florida Maritime Museum is a museum, sponsored by Manatee County Clerk of Circuit Courts, located on almost 4 acres (1.6 ha) of land known as the Cortez Nature Preserve within the historic fishing village of Cortez, Florida. It is open Tuesday-Friday and every second and fourth Saturday of the month from 10 a.m. – 4 p.m.

The museum tells a number of stories pertaining to all aspects of Florida's maritime history. Exhibits include historic photographs, boat models, tools, instruments, and other historic artifacts. The museum also features a large collection of shells from the Gulf of Mexico and a research library with a variety of books, plans, logs, diaries, periodicals, letters, records and related archival material whose content is relevant to research concerning maritime subjects, with special emphases on Florida's Gulf Coast. The museum is also home to The Folk School, which teaches traditional Florida maritime skills and folk art.

The museum is housed in a 1912 schoolhouse building at 4415 119th Street West. Other historic structures located on the site include the 1890 Burton/Bratton Store, a wooden cistern, and the 1907 Pillsbury Boatshop.

== Mission ==
The Florida Maritime Museum's mission is to collect, preserve and share traditional knowledge, cultural artifacts and personal stories specific to Florida's fishing and maritime heritage.

== Historic Structures and Grounds ==
The Florida Maritime Museum is located on almost 4 acres of land that include native plant gardens, fountains, a chickee hut, historic structures, and maritime objects. The grounds are open to the public from dusk to dawn.

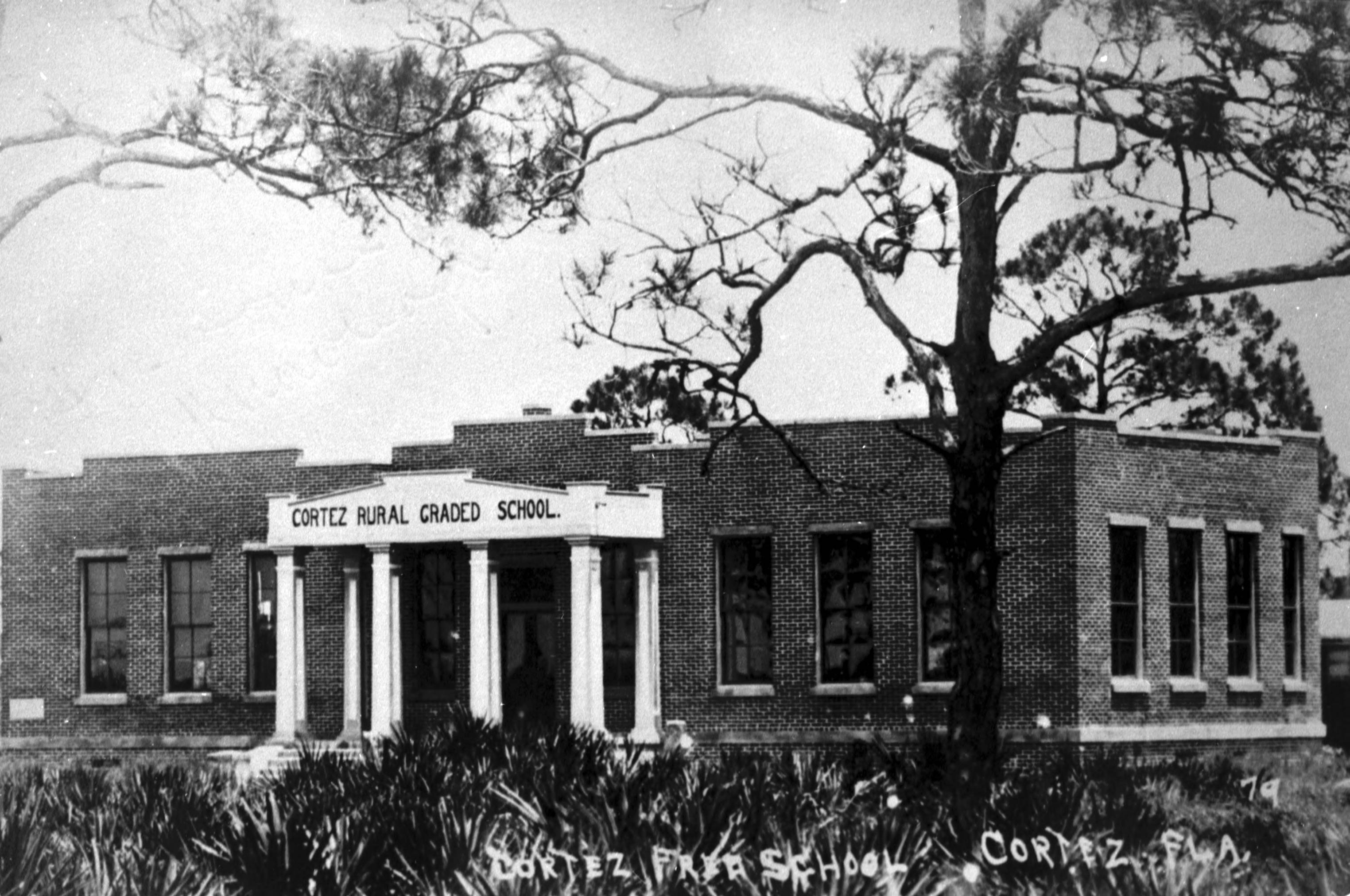
The Cortez Rural Graded Schoolhouse in the 1920s. Photo courtesy of Manatee County Public Library System.

=== 1912 Cortez Rural Graded Schoolhouse ===
The Cortez Rural Graded Schoolhouse was constructed in 1912 as one of six schools built by Manatee County that year. It replaced an older one-room structure that still stands in the village. Originally three rooms (two classrooms and a principal's office), the school underwent a Federal Works Progress Administration program in 1933 where the middle room, used as a principal's office, was extended into an auditorium with a stage, forming a T-shaped floor plan. The building was used as a school until 1961, when it was leased to an art school. It was ultimately bought in 1974 by Robert Sailors, a master weaver, who converted the old classrooms and auditorium into his studios and home, respectively. Sailors lived and worked in the building until his passing in 1995. In 1999, Manatee County purchased the property and carefully restored the building. In 2007, it was reopened as the Florida Maritime Museum. The Cortez Schoolhouse is listed on the National Register of Historic Places as part of the Cortez Historic District.

=== Robert Sailors' Secret Garden and Butterfly Garden ===
In 1974, Robert Sailors, a master weaver, purchased the Cortez Schoolhouse and transformed the property into his studio and living quarters. Sailors added two patios to the exterior of the schoolhouse, with one featuring a water sculpture of blue ceramic tile and lead-glass windows. Today, the Florida Maritime Museum continues to maintain the water sculpture as well as other sculptures featured throughout the grounds.

=== 1890 Burton/Bratton Store ===
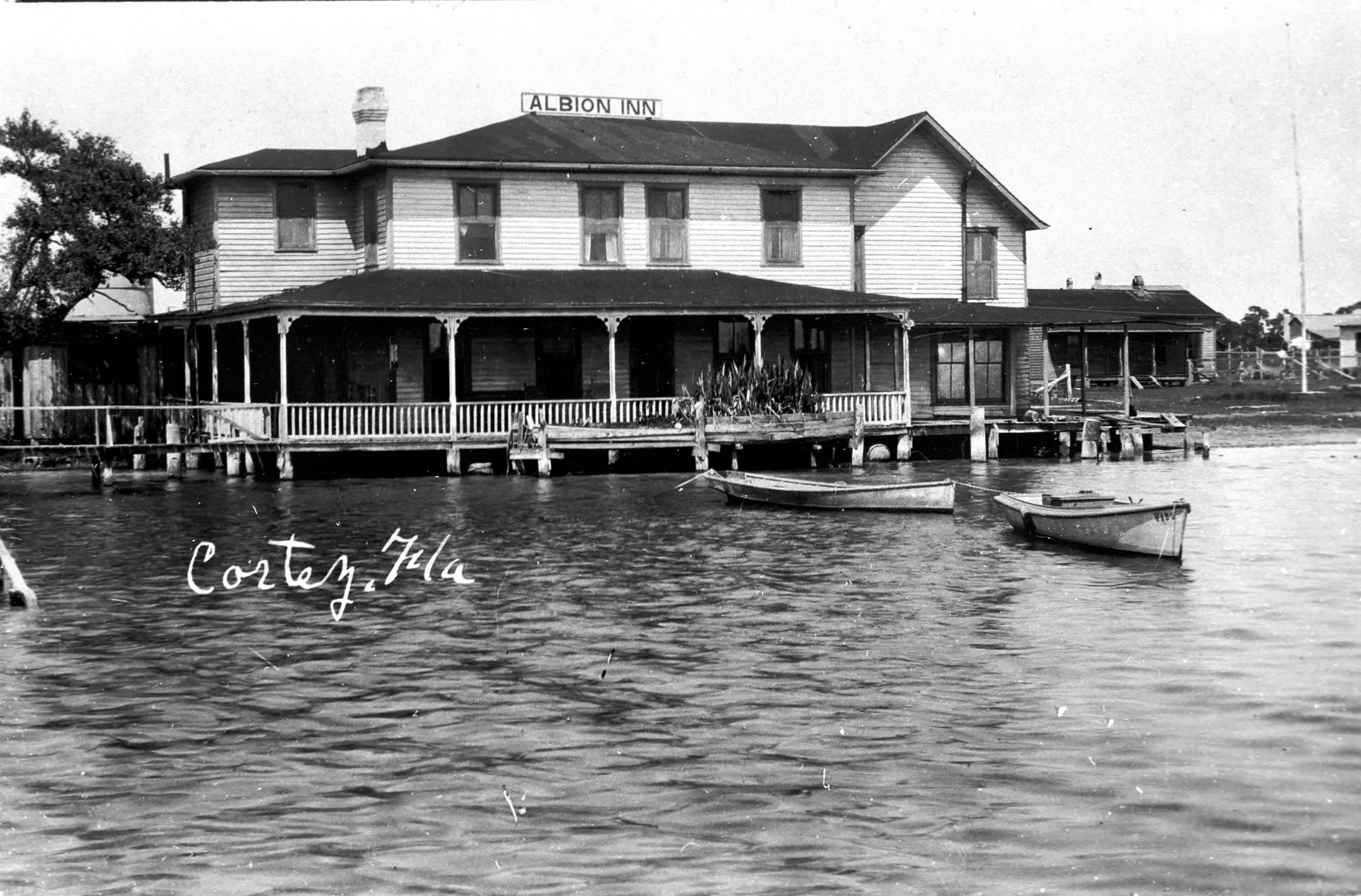
The Albion Inn and Burton Store, directly on the Cortez waterfront, with fishing boats tied in front sometime in the early 1900s. Photo courtesy of Manatee County Public Library System.

In the 1890s, William C. Bratton built the first commercial building at Hunter's Point, the original name of the area that would eventually be called Cortez. The building served as post office, general store and steamboat wharf and connected the village's fishing families with the outside world. In 1900, rooms were added creating an inn, which became known at the Albion Inn. Expanded over time, the Albion Inn, along with the 1912 Cortez Schoolhouse, served as refuge for the displaced residents of the small village during the destructive 1921 hurricane. In 1974, the inn closed and the property was sold to the US Coast Guard. A community effort spearheaded by the Cortez Village Historical Society and the Florida Institute for Saltwater Heritage (F.I.S.H.) saved the store from demolition in 1991. It was moved to this site in 2006. After renovations, the old store was reopened as a part of the Florida Maritime Museum in 2018. It currently houses museum collections upstairs and serves as office space downstairs.

=== Pillsbury Boat Shop ===
Edward Ithamar Pillsbury (1844-1930) started the Snead Island Boat Works on Snead Island in 1907. The Pillsbury Boat Shop was the first building constructed at the Snead Island Boat Works and named in honor of his son, Asa Harmon Pillsbury (1900-1985). As the boat works grew to accommodate the demand for larger boats, additional buildings were added to the complex, and the original building was modified for use as a machine shop, housing a lathe, small milling machine, and other metal working tools. Eventually the property was sold in 1930s, and the Pillsburys moved the structure to their home three miles away. It served as a machine shop there, too and was used to repair the Pillsbury dredging company's equipment. In 2007, the historic boat shop was transported, with sheriff escort, from Palmetto to the Florida Maritime Museum in Cortez.

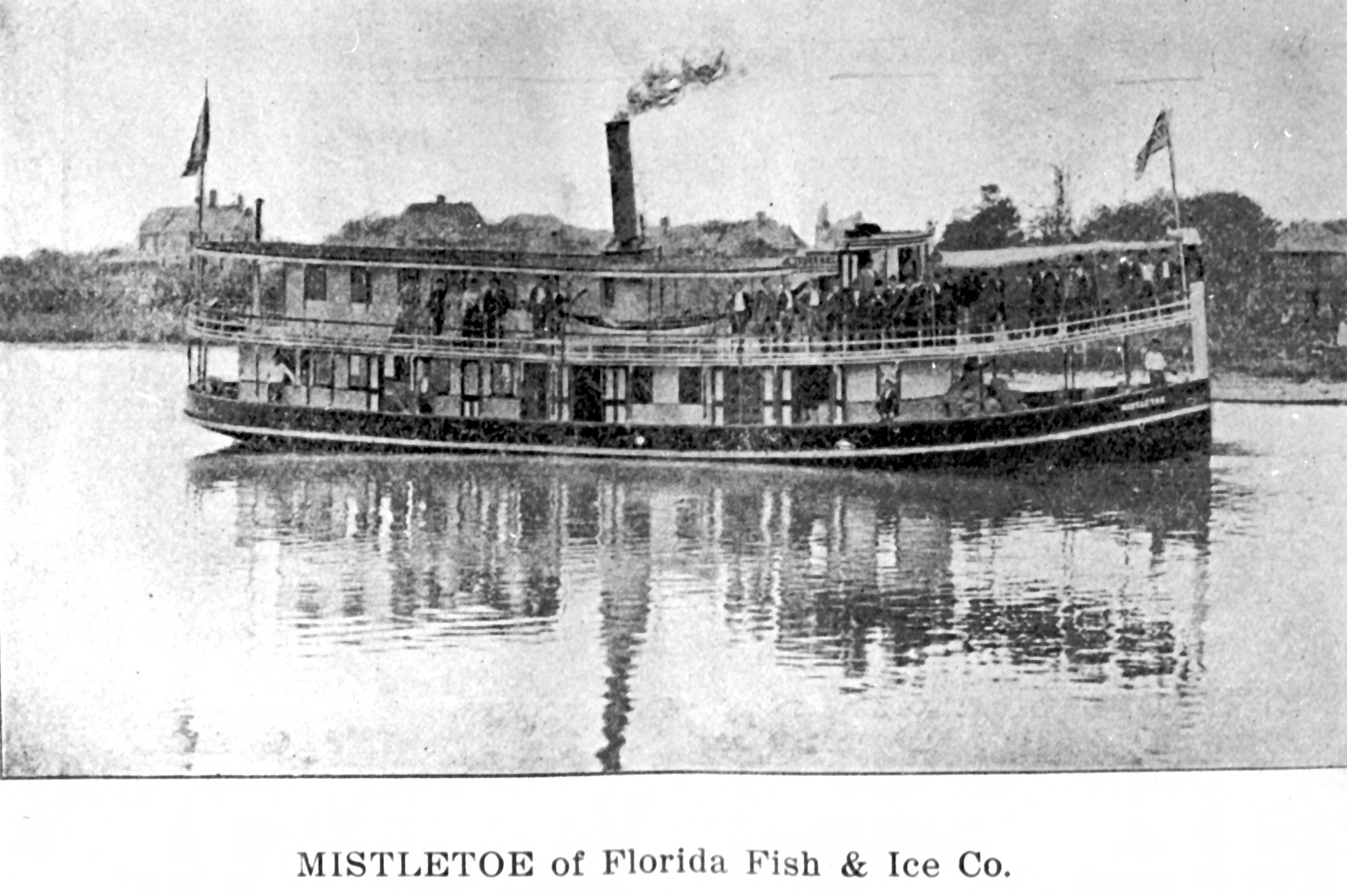
A 1900 postcard picture of the 100-foot long steamboat Mistletoe of the Florida Fish and Ice Company. Photo courtesy of Manatee County Public Library System.

=== Anchor of the Steamship 'Mistletoe' ===
The Florida Maritime Museum's grounds feature the anchor of the steamship the 'Mistletoe.' The steamship, owned by Tampa fisherman John Savarese, regularly brought passengers and goods from Tampa to Sarasota. The steamship stopped throughout Manatee County, including Bradenton and Cortez, until sinking in a hurricane in 1910. Shortly after she sank, the steamship was raised, renovated and rechristened 'The City of Sarasota' in 1911. She continued to carry passengers and cargo from Tampa to Sarasota until 1917. Pillsbury Boat Works on Snead Island purchased the steamship and converted her into a barge for a short time before pulling her ashore and burning her.

=== Marine Railway Winch ===
The railway winch located on the Florida Maritime Museum's grounds was used to haul large boats out of the water and into a repair station or dry-dock. The winch has a carriage pivotally connected to a support frame near the front of the carriage, and on a traverse horizontal axis. The rear of the support frame is provided with support abutments that are adjustable to accommodate the contour of the boat. A cable loop extends from a submerged pulley at the other end of the railway, and engages a winch activated by a remote control unit. The carriage is interposed in one side of the loop. This winch was used in the local area until the late 1980s. This unit's last location was the Rivertown Boatworks located on the Manatee River in Bradenton.

== Collections ==
=== The Blake Banks Collection ===
Captain Blake Banks was a successful Cortez fisherman with a passion for sea life. His collection is well documented, making it especially important academically. All of his specimens were collected in the Gulf of Mexico, some of which were eventually donated to the Florida Maritime Museum by his widow, Betty. Researchers and volunteers at the museum have been working studiously to create a chart that serves as a snapshot of where these specimens were collected.

=== Ship Models ===
Many of the models on display at the Florida Maritime Museum are miniature versions of real ships that played a role in Florida's maritime history.

=== Maritime Library ===
The Florida Maritime Museum is home to a small library of books on maritime topics that range from tales of old Florida to boat building and design. In addition to books, the museum houses a collection of boat plans, nautical charts and other archival materials that are available for scholarly research.

== The Folk School at the Florida Maritime Museum ==
The Folk School, which began in January 2017, enables the Florida Maritime Museum to take their mission a step further with hands-on classes formulated to not only learn and preserve classic skills, but to share stories, build community and grow appreciation for the history of Cortez and the greater surrounding area.

== See also ==
- List of museums in Florida
