= WTZB =

Coordinates: 27.106°N 82.400°W

- Englewood, Florida; United States
- Broadcast area: Sarasota; Bradenton
- Frequency: 105.9 MHz (HD Radio)
- Branding: Z105

Programming
- Format: Mainstream rock
- Subchannels: HD2: The Vinyl Experience

Ownership
- Owner: iHeartMedia, Inc.; (iHM Licenses, LLC)
- Sister stations: WBTP; WCTQ; WDIZ; WSDV; WSRZ-FM

History
- First air date: 1999 (as WYNF)
- Former call signs: WEDD (1996–1997, CP); WLTF (1997–1999, CP); WYNF (1999–2002); WSRQ (2002–2003)

Technical information
- Licensing authority: FCC
- Facility ID: 59127
- Class: C3
- ERP: 25,000 watts
- HAAT: 90 meters (300 ft)
- Translator: See § Translators
- Repeater: 106.5 WBTP-HD3 (Sarasota)

Links
- Public license information: Public file; LMS
- Webcast: Listen live (via iHeartRadio); HD2: Listen live (via iHeartRadio)
- Website: z105.iheart.com

WTZB (105.9 FM "Z105") is a commercial radio station licensed to Englewood, Florida, and serving the Sarasota - Bradenton area of Southwest Florida. It airs a hard-edged mainstream rock format and is owned by iHeartMedia, Inc. The studios and offices are on Fruitville Road (Florida State Road 780) in Sarasota.

WTZB is a Class C3 station. It has an effective radiated power (ERP) of 25,000 watts. The transmitter tower is on North Auburn Road in Venice, Florida. WTZB broadcasts using HD Radio technology. The HD2 digital subchannel carries an oldies format known as "The Vinyl Experience". WTZB's programming is also heard on 250-watt FM translator W286CQ at 105.1 MHz in Sarasota.

== History ==
The station signed on the air in 1999 as WYNF. As a construction permit, before it was built, the station also had the call signs WEDD and WLTF. In 2002, it used the call sign WSRQ before becoming WTZB the following year.

On February 1, 2016, WTZB changed its format from active rock (as "105.9 The Buzz") to classic rock, branded as "Z105". Leading up to the format flip, WTZB stunted by playing AC/DC's "For Those About to Rock" on a loop for an entire weekend.

On September 23, 2019, the station launched a live local morning drive time show titled "Frank's Garage" hosted by a DJ known as "Frank The Tank." In 2023, Z105 adjusted its format to mainstream rock.

== Translators ==
Broadcast translator for WBTP-HD3
Call sign	Frequency	City of license	FID	ERP (W)	HAAT	Class	FCC info
W286CQ	105.1 FM	Sarasota, Florida	140144	250	169 m (554 ft)	D	LMS
