= WSRZ-FM =

- Coral Cove, Florida; United States
- Broadcast area: Sarasota and Bradenton
- Frequency: 107.9 MHz (HD Radio)
- Branding: 107.9 WSRZ

Programming
- Format: Classic hits
- Subchannels: HD2: Hot AC (WSDV)
- Affiliations: Premiere Networks

Ownership
- Owner: iHeartMedia, Inc.; (iHM Licenses, LLC)
- Sister stations: WBTP, WCTQ, WDIZ, WSDV, WTZB

History
- First air date: June 30, 1965
- Former call signs: WMLO (1982–1986); WSRZ (1986–1991); WVFE (1991–1994); WYNF (1994–1999)

Technical information
- Licensing authority: FCC
- Facility ID: 48673
- Class: C2
- ERP: 47,000 watts
- HAAT: 155 meters (509 ft)
- Transmitter coordinates: 27°9′3.00″N 82°27′51.00″W

Links
- Public license information: Public file; LMS
- Webcast: Listen live (via iHeartRadio)
- Website: wsrz.iheart.com

WSRZ-FM (107.9 FM) is a commercial radio station licensed to Coral Cove, Florida, United States, and serving the Sarasota and Bradenton areas. It has a classic hits format and is owned by iHeartMedia, Inc. The studios are on Fruitville Road in Sarasota.

The transmitter is off North Tamiami Trail (U.S. Route 41) at Florida Route 681 in Nokomis. WSRZ-FM broadcasts using HD Radio technology; its HD2 digital subchannel rebroadcasts the hot AC programming of WSDV.

== History ==
=== WSPB-FM, WMLO ===
The station signed on the air on June 30, 1965. It originally broadcast on 106.3 MHz as WSPB-FM, sister station to WSPB 1450 AM (now WSDV). In 1982, it switched to WMLO (branded as "Mellow 106.3") playing soft adult contemporary music. The station flipped to oldies in 1984 and its frequency moved to 106.5 FM.

In September 1986, the station changed its call letters to WSRZ. It aired a Top 40 format known as Z-106 after Robert Weeks (former owner of the station) sold the station to Sarasota Radio Partners Inc. The station carried the syndicated "Rick Dees Weekly Top 40" starting with the station's debut as a Top 40 outlet, one of two contemporary hits stations in the Tampa Bay area. However, WSRZ didn't go full-time CHR until 1988. The Contemporary Hits format was unsuccessful for the station. As at that point, CHR listeners preferred 104.7 WRBQ or later WFLZ 93.3 "The Power Pig." Both those stations had medium-to-strong signals in the Sarasota-Bradenton areas, and 97.1 WINK-FM Fort Myers had a medium-to-strong signal in the Venice area.

With those stations adding to the competition, Z-106 did not remain a Top 40 station for long. WSRZ returned to its former oldies format in 1990. It was located at 106.5 MHz, known as 'Oldies 106' and played music from the 1950s to the early 1970s. Weekend specialty programming included street corner harmony Doo-wop shows.

=== WSRZ moves to 107.9 ===
In 1999, a major shift was completed among Clear Channel Communications stations in the Sarasota-Bradenton region. Country WCTQ (92 CTQ) moved to the superior 106.5 position, WSRZ moved to the slightly less-powerful 107.9 position, and active rock station WYNF moved from 107.9 to the newly created (and lower powered) 105.9. 92.1 adopted a soft AC format as "The Dove".

After moving to its current 107.9 frequency, WSRZ-FM was then renamed as "Oldies 108". In early 2007, the moniker was changed to the present "107.9 WSRZ", dropping music from the 1950s and 60s. The current format is classic hits, focusing on music from the 1970s and 80s, with some 90s hits.

== Programming ==
WSRZ-FM's local morning drive time show is Jones and Company. It was formerly known as The Jones and Crane Morning Show prior to Christina Crane's retirement in 2017. It currently features David Jones and Meredith Michaels.

The hosts have incorporated numerous fundraising and community service related causes into the show, including an annual toy and fund drive benefiting The Safe Children's Coalition-Sarasota YMCA. There's also an annual blood drive benefiting the Suncoast Community Blood Bank. The hosts frequently throw parties for listeners on Friday nights.

The rest of the WSRZ-FM schedule is nationally syndicated shows and voice-tracked hosts from other iHeart stations.
