= Vamo, Florida =

- Census-designated place
- Location in Sarasota County and the state of Florida
- Coordinates: 27°13′22″N 82°30′06″W
- Country: United States
- State: Florida
- County: Sarasota

Area
  - Total: 1.098 sq mi (2.84 km^{2})
  - Land: 0.779 sq mi (2.02 km^{2})
  - Water: 0.319 sq mi (0.83 km^{2}) 29%
- Elevation: 13 ft (4.0 m)

Population (2020)
  - Total: 2,822
  - Density: 3,621.2/sq mi (1,398.17/km^{2})
- Time zone: UTC-5 (Eastern (EST))
  - Summer (DST): UTC-4 (EDT)
- FIPS code: 12-73725
- GNIS feature ID: 2402960

Vamo is a census-designated place (CDP) in Sarasota County, Florida, United States. The population was 2,822 at the 2020 census, down from 4,727 at the 2010 census. It is part of the North Port–Bradenton–Sarasota, Florida Metropolitan Statistical Area.

== Geography ==
According to the United States Census Bureau, the CDP in 2010 had a total area of 1.9 square miles (4.9 km^{2}), of which 1.5 square miles (3.8 km^{2}) is land and 0.39 square miles (1.0 km^{2}), or 21.09%, is water. The area of the CDP was changed in the 2020 census, its total area was decreased to 1.10 square miles (2.84 km^{2}), of which 0.78 square miles (2.02 km^{2}) is land and 0.32 square miles (0.83 km^{2}), or 29%, is water.

== History ==
Vamo was founded by the Webb family in 1928. They established the first home in the neighborhood on the Sarasota Bay Inlet off what is now known as Vamo Drive. This area is famous for its historic Spanish-style homes. The name "Vamo" originated from the home states of Mr. and Mrs. Webb: Mrs. Webb was born in Virginia, and Mr. Webb was born in Missouri. There is also a street in the neighborhood named Mova Street.

== Demographics ==
Historical population
Census	Pop.	Note	%±
1990	3,325		—
2000	5,285		58.9%
2010	4,727		−10.6%
2020	2,822		−40.3%
2010 census

=== 2020 census ===
As of the 2020 census, Vamo had a population of 2,822. The median age was 65.2 years. 8.8% of residents were under the age of 18 and 50.2% of residents were 65 years of age or older. For every 100 females there were 86.9 males, and for every 100 females age 18 and over there were 85.0 males age 18 and over.

100.0% of residents lived in urban areas, while 0.0% lived in rural areas.

There were 1,490 households in Vamo, of which 10.1% had children under the age of 18 living in them. Of all households, 42.4% were married-couple households, 18.5% were households with a male householder and no spouse or partner present, and 32.1% were households with a female householder and no spouse or partner present. About 40.3% of all households were made up of individuals and 30.3% had someone living alone who was 65 years of age or older.

There were 1,845 housing units, of which 19.2% were vacant. The homeowner vacancy rate was 3.0% and the rental vacancy rate was 13.0%.

Racial composition as of the 2020 census
Race	Number	Percent
White	2,477	87.8%
Black or African American	44	1.6%
American Indian and Alaska Native	7	0.2%
Asian	38	1.3%
Native Hawaiian and Other Pacific Islander	0	0.0%
Some other race	82	2.9%
Two or more races	174	6.2%
Hispanic or Latino (of any race)	208	7.4%

=== 2000 census ===
As of the census of 2000, there were 5,285 people, 2,516 households, and 1,335 families residing in the CDP. The population density was 2,981.3 inhabitants per square mile (1,151.1/km^{2}). There were 3,063 housing units at an average density of 1,727.9 per square mile (667.1/km^{2}). The racial makeup of the CDP was 96.90% White, 0.72% African American, 0.17% Native American, 1.10% Asian, 0.42% from other races, and 0.70% from two or more races. Hispanic or Latino of any race were 3.56% of the population.

There were 2,516 households, out of which 16.5% had children under the age of 18 living with them, 42.4% were married couples living together, 7.5% had a female householder with no husband present, and 46.9% were non-families. 38.7% of all households were made up of individuals, and 17.7% had someone living alone who was 65 years of age or older. The average household size was 1.92 and the average family size was 2.52.

In the CDP, the population was spread out, with 13.4% under the age of 18, 5.9% from 18 to 24, 25.0% from 25 to 44, 21.2% from 45 to 64, and 34.5% who were 65 years of age or older. The median age was 50 years. For every 100 females, there were 81.6 males. For every 100 females age 18 and over, there were 77.2 males.

The median income for a household in the CDP was $45,945, and the median income for a family was $53,041. Males had a median income of $39,030 versus $27,800 for females. The per capita income for the CDP was $32,068. About 4.1% of families and 5.6% of the population were below the poverty line, including 8.7% of those under age 18 and 1.5% of those age 65 or over.
