= South Bradenton, Florida =

- Census-designated place
- Location in Manatee County and the state of Florida
- Coordinates: 27°27′40″N 82°34′56″W
- Country: United States
- State: Florida
- County: Manatee

Area
  - Total: 4.59 sq mi (11.89 km^{2})
  - Land: 4.50 sq mi (11.66 km^{2})
  - Water: 0.089 sq mi (0.23 km^{2})
- Elevation: 23 ft (7.0 m)

Population (2020)
  - Total: 26,858
  - Density: 5,968.4/sq mi (2,304.41/km^{2})
- Time zone: UTC-5 (Eastern (EST))
  - Summer (DST): UTC-4 (EDT)
- ZIP Codes: 34205, 34207 (Bradenton)
- Area code: 941
- FIPS code: 12-67258
- GNIS feature ID: 2402868

South Bradenton is an unincorporated community and census-designated place (CDP) in Manatee County, Florida, United States. The population was 26,858 at the 2020 census, up from 22,178 in 2010. It is part of the North Port–Bradenton–Sarasota, Florida Metropolitan Statistical Area.

== Geography ==
South Bradenton is bordered to the north and west by the city of Bradenton, to the south by Bayshore Gardens, and to the east by West Samoset. According to the United States Census Bureau, the CDP has a total area of 4.6 square miles (11.9 km^{2}), of which 4.5 square miles (11.7 km^{2}) are land, and 0.1 square miles (0.2 km^{2}), or 1.96%, are water.

== Demographics ==
Historical population
Census	Pop.	Note	%±
1970	10,820		—
1980	14,297		32.1%
1990	20,398		42.7%
2000	21,587		5.8%
2010	22,178		2.7%
2020	26,858		21.1%

=== 2020 census ===
As of the 2020 census, South Bradenton had a population of 26,858. The median age was 44.7 years. 19.6% of residents were under the age of 18 and 24.8% of residents were 65 years of age or older. For every 100 females there were 92.3 males, and for every 100 females age 18 and over there were 90.1 males age 18 and over.

100.0% of residents lived in urban areas, while 0.0% lived in rural areas.

There were 12,051 households in South Bradenton, of which 22.9% had children under the age of 18 living in them. Of all households, 30.1% were married-couple households, 26.0% were households with a male householder and no spouse or partner present, and 35.5% were households with a female householder and no spouse or partner present. About 39.0% of all households were made up of individuals and 19.8% had someone living alone who was 65 years of age or older.

There were 14,721 housing units, of which 18.1% were vacant. The homeowner vacancy rate was 1.8% and the rental vacancy rate was 7.0%.

Racial composition as of the 2020 census
Race	Number	Percent
White	16,515	61.5%
Black or African American	2,925	10.9%
American Indian and Alaska Native	170	0.6%
Asian	344	1.3%
Native Hawaiian and Other Pacific Islander	21	0.1%
Some other race	3,223	12.0%
Two or more races	3,660	13.6%
Hispanic or Latino (of any race)	7,870	29.3%

=== 2000 census ===
As of the 2000 United States census, there were 21,587 people, 10,681 households, and 5,522 families residing in the CDP. The population density was 4,840.4 inhabitants per square mile (1,868.9/km^{2}). There were 13,283 housing units at an average density of 2,978.4 per square mile (1,150.0/km^{2}). The racial makeup of the CDP was 89.92% White, 4.62% African American, 0.32% Native American, 1.31% Asian, 0.10% Pacific Islander, 2.17% from other races, and 1.58% from two or more races. Hispanic or Latino of any race were 8.66% of the population.

There were 10,681 households, out of which 18.1% had children under the age of 18 living with them, 36.9% were married couples living together, 10.8% had a female householder with no husband present, and 48.3% were non-families. 40.4% of all households were made up of individuals, and 20.2% had someone living alone who was 65 years of age or older. The average household size was 2.00 and the average family size was 2.64.

In the CDP, the population was spread out, with 17.5% under the age of 18, 8.2% from 18 to 24, 25.2% from 25 to 44, 20.4% from 45 to 64, and 28.7% who were 65 years of age or older. The median age was 44 years. For every 100 females, there were 87.7 males. For every 100 females age 18 and over, there were 84.9 males.

The median income for a household in the CDP was $27,410, and the median income for a family was $32,444. Males had a median income of $25,011 versus $21,559 for females. The per capita income for the CDP was $17,549. About 9.5% of families and 13.0% of the population were below the poverty line, including 18.2% of those under age 18 and 5.9% of those age 65 or over.
