= Cortez Historic District =

Historic district in Florida, United States

- U.S. National Register of Historic Places
- U.S. Historic district
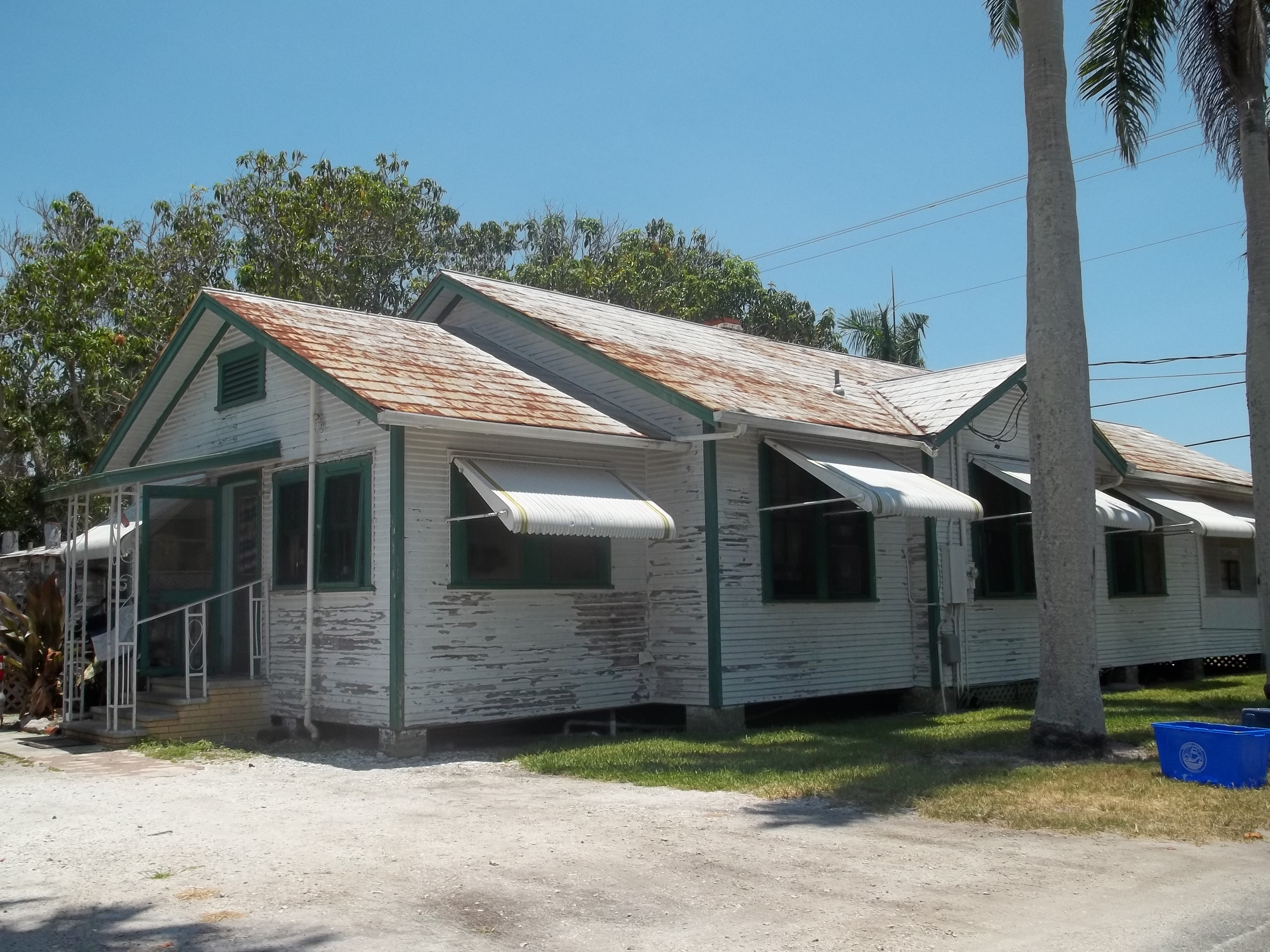

- Location within Florida Location within the United States
- Location: Cortez, Florida
- Coordinates: 27°28′3″N 82°41′2″W
- NRHP reference No.: 95000250
- Added to NRHP: March 16, 1995

The Cortez Historic District is a U.S. historic district (designated as such on March 16, 1995) located in Cortez, Florida. The district is bounded by Cortez Road, 119th Street W, Sarasota Bay and 124th Street Court W.
