= WWPR (AM) =

Bradenton, Florida; United States
- Broadcast area: North Port–Bradenton–Sarasota
- Frequency: 1490 kHz
- Branding: 1490 WWPR AM

Programming
- Languages: English (weekdays); Spanish (weekends)
- Format: Talk/Brokered
- Affiliations: Genesis Communications Network; USA Radio Network

Ownership
- Owner: Vidify Media, Inc.

History
- First air date: 1946
- Former call signs: WDHL (1946–1952); WTRL (1952–1988); WKLV (1988–1992); WJRB (1992–1994); WYMZ (1994–1995)

Technical information
- Licensing authority: FCC
- Facility ID: 60587
- Class: C
- Power: 800 watts
- Transmitter coordinates: 27°28′37.1″N 82°32′8.3″W

Links
- Public license information: Public file; LMS
- Webcast: Listen live
- Website: 1490wwpr.com

WWPR (1490 kHz) is an American AM radio station licensed to serve the community of Bradenton, the county seat of Manatee County, Florida, United States. The station is currently owned and operated by Vidify Media, Inc.

== Programming ==
On weekdays, WWPR broadcasts a talk radio format to Manatee County, as well as parts of Sarasota, Pinellas, and Hillsborough counties. On weekday mornings and mid-days these are local political talk programs. Weekday programs also include brokered talk shows on health, boating, and sports. Weekends include religious and Spanish-language programs.

== History ==
The station, founded in 1946 as WDHL, was assigned the call sign WWPR by the Federal Communications Commission (FCC) on January 3, 1995.
