= Palma Sola Bay =

Florida bay

- Location within Florida
- Location: Florida, USA
- Coordinates: 27°28′46.3″N 82°39′16.7″W
- Type: Bay

Palma Sola Bay is a bay located at the western side of Florida, near Bradenton, Florida. The bay is part of Tampa Bay.
