= WSDV =

- Sarasota, Florida; United States
- Broadcast area: Sarasota; Bradenton
- Frequency: 1450 kHz
- Branding: 103.9 Kiss FM

Programming
- Format: Hot adult contemporary

Ownership
- Owner: iHeartMedia, Inc.; (iHM Licenses, LLC)
- Sister stations: WBTP; WCTQ; WDIZ; WSRZ-FM; WTZB

History
- First air date: December 7, 1939
- Former call signs: WSPB (1939–1988); WWKY (1988–1989); WSPB (1989); WSRZ (1989–1990); WSPB (1990–2003); WSRQ (2003–2006)

Technical information
- Licensing authority: FCC
- Facility ID: 48671
- Class: C
- Power: 1,000 watts unlimited
- Transmitter coordinates: 27°20′12.2″N 82°34′24.4″W
- Translator: 103.9 W280EV (Sarasota)
- Repeater: 107.9 WSRZ-HD2 (Coral Cove)

Links
- Public license information: Public file; LMS
- Webcast: Listen live (via iHeartRadio)
- Website: kiss1039.iheart.com

WSDV (1450 kHz) is a commercial radio station licensed to Sarasota, Florida, and broadcasting to the Sarasota - Bradenton radio market. The station airs a hot adult contemporary format, switching to Christmas music for much of November and December. It is owned by iHeartMedia, Inc.

WSDV is powered at 1,000 watts non-directional. Programming is also heard on FM translator W280EV. The station uses the translator's dial position, calling itself "103.9 KISS-FM".

== History ==
On December 7, 1939, the station first signed on the air. Its call sign was originally WSPB, powered at 250 watts, located at 1420 kilocycles. Its tower and studios were on City Island. The North American Regional Broadcasting Agreement (NARBA) in 1941 moved its dial position to 1450 kHz.

WSPB became an affiliate of the CBS Radio Network, airing CBS's line up of dramas, comedies, news, sports, soap operas, game shows and big band broadcasts. It was unique among stations on the Gulf Coast of Florida to run hourly news updates before this was a common practice.

In 1965, WSPB-FM signed on at 106.3 (now WBTP at 106.5) as a full-time simulcast of the AM. There have been many formats at 1450, ranging from classical music in the 1990s to oldies later in the decade. For part of the 1990s, WSPB simulcast co-owned Tampa talk radio station WFLA until 2002. At that point, it switched to adult standards, using the WSRQ call letters beginning in 2003.

On January 3, 2014, WSDV and its Venice simulcast WDDV (1320 AM) rebranded themselves as "Sunny" and diverted from adult standards to an oldies/soft AC format. On March 17, 2016, WSDV and WDDV switched to a talk radio format.

On November 1, 2017, WSDV split from its simulcast with WDDV and began playing Christmas music. On January 1, 2018, at midnight, the station became 103.9 Kiss FM with a Top 40/CHR format. It is the only iHeartMedia-owned KISS-FM station on the AM band, although most of its listeners tune in the 103.9 translator to hear the station in FM stereo.

On November 11, 2022, at 5 p.m., WSDV dropped the "Kiss FM" brand, switching to Christmas music as "103.9 Santa FM" It returned to Kiss-FM on December 31, 2022. It flipped again to holiday tunes in early November 2023.
