= WBTP (FM) =

- Sarasota, Florida; United States
- Broadcast area: Tampa Bay Area
- Frequency: 106.5 MHz (HD Radio)
- Branding: 106.5 The Beat

Programming
- Format: Classic hip hop
- Subchannels: HD2: Simulcast of WCTQ (classic country); HD3: Simulcast of WTZB (classic rock)
- Affiliations: Premiere Networks

Ownership
- Owner: iHeartMedia, Inc.; (iHM Licenses, LLC)
- Sister stations: WCTQ; WDIZ; WSDV; WSRZ-FM; WTZB

History
- First air date: June 30, 1965
- Former call signs: WSPB-FM (1965–1982); WMLO (1982–1986); WSRZ (1986–1989); WSRZ-FM (1989–1999); WCTQ (1999–2016); WLTQ-FM (2016); WRUB (2016–2024)
- Call sign meaning: "Beat of Tampa"

Technical information
- Licensing authority: FCC
- Facility ID: 48672
- Class: C2
- ERP: 13,000 watts
- HAAT: 178 meters (584 ft)
- Transmitter coordinates: 27°32′43.1″N 82°34′26.3″W
- Translators: HD2: 103.1 W276CR (Bradenton); HD3: 105.1 W286CQ (Sarasota)
- Repeater: 103.5 WFUS-HD2 (Gulfport)

Links
- Public license information: Public file; LMS
- Webcast: Listen live (via iHeartRadio)
- Website: thebeattampabay.iheart.com

WBTP (106.5 MHz) is a commercial FM radio station broadcasting a classic hip hop format. Licensed to Sarasota, Florida, it serves the Sarasota–Bradenton and Tampa Bay Areas. The station is owned by iHeartMedia, Inc., with studios on West Gandy Boulevard in Tampa.

WBTP has an effective radiated power (ERP) of 13,000 watts. It broadcasts using HD Radio technology. The transmitter is near the intersection of 33rd Street W and 8th Avenue W in Memphis, south of the Sunshine Skyway Bridge. That gives WBTP city-grade coverage not only in the Sarasota-Bradenton area, but also around Tampa Bay and as far north as Largo. The station's coverage area extends north towards Lakeland and Pasco County.

== History ==
=== WSPB-FM ===
The station signed on the air on June 30, 1965. The original call sign was WSPB-FM, the sister station to WSPB 1450 AM (now WSDV). WSPB-FM was first heard on 106.3 MHz, powered at 3,000 watts. In its early days, it mostly simulcast the full service, middle of the road format on 1450, including popular adult music, news and sports. WSPB-AM-FM were network affiliates of CBS Radio.

In the 1970s, WSPB-FM switched to an automated easy listening format. The station went through several formats and call letter changes. In 1999, it became WCTQ playing country music.

=== WCTQ and WLTQ-FM ===
On February 24, 2016, WCTQ began simulcasting its country format on WLTQ-FM 92.1 in Venice, Florida. The adult contemporary format on "The Coast" WLTQ-FM was dropped, and that station was re-branded as "92.1 CTQ". This was in preparation for a new format on the 106.5 frequency. The flip put WCTQ back on its previous home on the dial, which it occupied from 1987 to 1999.

On February 29, 2016, WCTQ at 106.5 changed its call letters to WLTQ-FM. On March 7, 2016, WLTQ-FM switched its format to Spanish contemporary hits, branded as "Rumba 106.5". The station targeted not just the Sarasota area but also the Tampa Bay radio market to the north.

=== WRUB ===
On March 14, 2016, Rumba 106.5 began simulcasting on FM translator 100.3 W262CP Bayonet Point, which is fed by the signal from co-owned 103.5 WFUS-HD2. The translator broadcasts directionally to the south from its transmitter in Holiday. It serves northern Pinellas County (but not its city of license of Bayonet Point, which is further north from Holiday). The extra signal is needed, due to interference with the 106.5 frequency from WGHR Spring Hill. That same day, 106.5 changed its call sign to WRUB to match the new format and the "Rumba" moniker.

WRUB has since discontinued broadcasting over W262CP (100.3 FM), which now rebroadcasts Salem Media Group station WTBN (570 AM) Pinellas Park. It now is heard on translator W276CR (103.1 FM) in Bradenton.

=== WBTP ===
On July 18, 2024, at noon, the "Rumba" format moved to WBTP (95.7 FM). At the same time, WRUB assumed WBTP's former branding as "106.5 & 102.9 The Beat"; with the move, the format shifted from the urban contemporary focus it had on WBTP to a classic hip hop format. The first song as "The Beat" was "I Wanna Love You" by Akon. The two stations would swap callsigns on July 29.
