= WDIZ (AM) =

- Venice, Florida; United States
- Broadcast area: Sarasota metropolitan area
- Frequency: 1320 kHz
- Branding: Oldies 1320

Programming
- Format: Oldies
- Affiliations: Premiere Networks

Ownership
- Owner: iHeartMedia, Inc.; (iHM Licenses, LLC)
- Sister stations: WBTP; WCTQ; WSDV; WSRZ-FM; WTZB

History
- First air date: February 1, 1960 (as WAMR)
- Former call signs: WDMR (1957–1959); WAMR (1959–2005); WDDV (2005–2020)
- Call sign meaning: no local meaning; originally used for Orlando sister station WRUM

Technical information
- Licensing authority: FCC
- Facility ID: 3060
- Class: B
- Power: 5,000 watts day; 142 watts night
- Transmitter coordinates: 27°6′19.2″N 82°23′58.3″W

Links
- Public license information: Public file; LMS
- Webcast: Listen live (via iHeartRadio)
- Website: oldies1320.iheart.com

WDIZ (1320 AM) is a commercial radio station broadcasting an oldies format. Licensed to Venice, Florida, United States, the station serves the Sarasota metropolitan area. WDIZ is owned by iHeartMedia, Inc. and calls itself "Oldies 1320", Venice's Real Oldies. The station uses iHeartMedia's Real Oldies network that mainly focuses on hits from the 1970s and 1980s.

== History ==
The station signed on as WAMR on February 1, 1960. It was owned by Venice Nokomis Broadcasting, Inc. and was a daytimer station, with a power of 500 watts, and required to sign off at sunset to avoid interfering with other stations on AM 1320. It aired a middle of the road (MOR) music format.

In the 1980s, the daytime power was increased to 5,000 watts and the station was given nighttime authorization with 1,000 watts. In 1988, the station was acquired by Asterisk Radio, Inc., which kept the MOR format in the daytime but added talk programming from NBC Talknet at night. In the 1990s, the music was decreased and talk programming took over the daily schedule.

In 1999, Citicasters acquired the station. Citicasters later merged into Clear Channel Communications, which today is iHeartMedia, Inc. After top-rated WDUV (103.5 FM), an easy listening station, switched to a soft adult contemporary format and moved to a transmitter north of Tampa, Clear Channel decided to go after its displaced listeners in the Sarasota area. WAMR became WDDV, a call sign similar to the departed FM station. WDDV's format changed to adult standards.

On March 17, 2016, WDDV flipped from adult standards to talk and business news. On weekdays, WDDV simulcast the morning drive time show, "AM Tampa Bay", from WFLA in Tampa. The rest of the schedule consisted of syndicated talk shows and business news from Bloomberg Radio. Some hours were paid brokered programming.

On May 5, 2020, iHeartMedia flipped WDDV from news/talk to oldies, branded as "Oldies 1320", using iHeartMedia's Real Oldies network. The call sign was changed to WDIZ on June 29, 2020.
