= WCTQ =

- Venice, Florida; United States
- Broadcast area: Sarasota; Bradenton
- Frequency: 92.1 MHz (HD Radio)
- Branding: 92.1 CTQ

Programming
- Format: Classic country
- Subchannels: HD2: Top 40 (CHR) "Hit Nation"

Ownership
- Owner: iHeartMedia, Inc.; (iHM Licenses, LLC)
- Sister stations: WBTP; WDIZ; WSDV; WSRZ-FM; WTZB

History
- First air date: March 1, 1974 (as WAMR-FM)
- Former call signs: WAMR-FM (1974–1983); WRAV (1983–1987); WCTQ (1987–1999); WDDV (1999–2005); WLTQ-FM (2005–2016)

Technical information
- Licensing authority: FCC
- Facility ID: 3059
- Class: C3
- ERP: 11,500 watts
- HAAT: 145 meters (476 ft)
- Transmitter coordinates: 27°9′4.2″N 82°27′50.3″W
- Translator: 103.1 W276CR (Bradenton)
- Repeater: 106.5 WBTP-HD2 (Sarasota)

Links
- Public license information: Public file; LMS
- Webcast: Listen live (via iHeartRadio); HD2: Listen live (via iHeartRadio)
- Website: 921ctq.iheart.com

WCTQ (92.1 FM) is a radio station broadcasting with a classic country format. Licensed to Venice, Florida, the station serves the Sarasota-Bradenton area. It is currently owned by iHeartMedia, Inc.

WCTQ is a Class C3 FM station, with an effective radiated power (ERP) of 11,500 watts. The transmitter is on North Tamiami Trail (U.S. Route 41) at Florida State Road 681 (Venice Connector). Programming is also heard on 250-watt FM translator W276CR at 103.1 MHz in Bradenton. WCTQ broadcasts using HD Radio technology. Its HD2 subchannel airs a Top 40 (CHR) format.

== History ==
The station signed on the air on March 1, 1974. Its original call sign was WAMR-FM, the sister station to WAMR 1320 AM (now WDIZ). The two stations were owned by the Venice Broadcasting Company and they simulcast a middle of the road format of adult popular music, local news and sports. The station went through a series of format and call letter changes over the next three decades.

In 2005, the format switched to soft adult contemporary with the call sign WLTQ-FM. The call letters stood for "Lite" as in light music. Over time, the tempo picked up and the station transitioned to hot adult contemporary hits.

On October 31, 2011, WLTQ-FM began playing Christmas music, branded as "Santa 92.1". Then, on December 26 at midnight, the station changed to an adult contemporary sound as "92.1 The Coast".

On February 24, 2016, WLTQ-FM changed its format to a simulcast of country music-formatted WCTQ 106.5 FM in preparation for a new Spanish hits format on 106.5. On February 29, 2016, WLTQ-FM changed call signs to WCTQ, returning the country format and call letters to 92.1 after 17 years.

On September 7, 2022, WCTQ shifted its format from country to classic country. Core artists include Garth Brooks, Brooks & Dunn, Reba McEntire, Luke Bryan, Carrie Underwood and Kenny Chesney. WCTQ will go back occasionally for songs from Willie Nelson, Dolly Parton and Waylon Jennings.

== CTQ alumni ==
- Dave McClure (GM)
- Jim Davis (GM)
- Sherri Carlson (GM)
- Kim Ashley (former PD)
- Ron Merritt (former PD)
- John Brooks (former PD)
- Ed Couzins (former PD)
- Rob Carpenter (former PD)
- Rich Stevens (former PD)
- Mark "The Shark" Wilson (former PD and PM Drive)
- Sammy Cruise (former PD)
- Tim Jones (former PD)
- Frank Benny & Del Potts
- Frank & Del - morning drive)
- Tim & Willy (mornings)
- Maverick Johnson (longtime morning host)
- Pam Grey (middays)
- Tracy Black (midday host, Public Files Director 1991–2005)
- Heidi Decker (middays)
- Sara Jacobs (middays)
- Wanda Myles (morning co-host)
- Morgan (morning co-host)
- Sammi Jo Austin (morning co-host)
- Lulu Krysz (morning co-host)
- Frank Benny (news)
- Steven James (7-Mid M-F) & All Request Saturday Nights
- Pat Conner (After Midnight, News)
- Martin Haire (news)
- Scott Marino (traffic, weather & weekends)
- Ryan Rafferdy (news & weekends)
- Stormi Summers (host, 1992–1994)

== Translator ==
WCTQ also broadcasts on the following translator:

Broadcast translator for WCTQ
Call sign	Frequency	City of license	FID	ERP (W)	Class	FCC info
W276CR	103.1 FM	Bradenton, Florida	149125	250	D	LMS
