= Film industry in Florida =

Overview of the film industry in the U.S. state of Florida

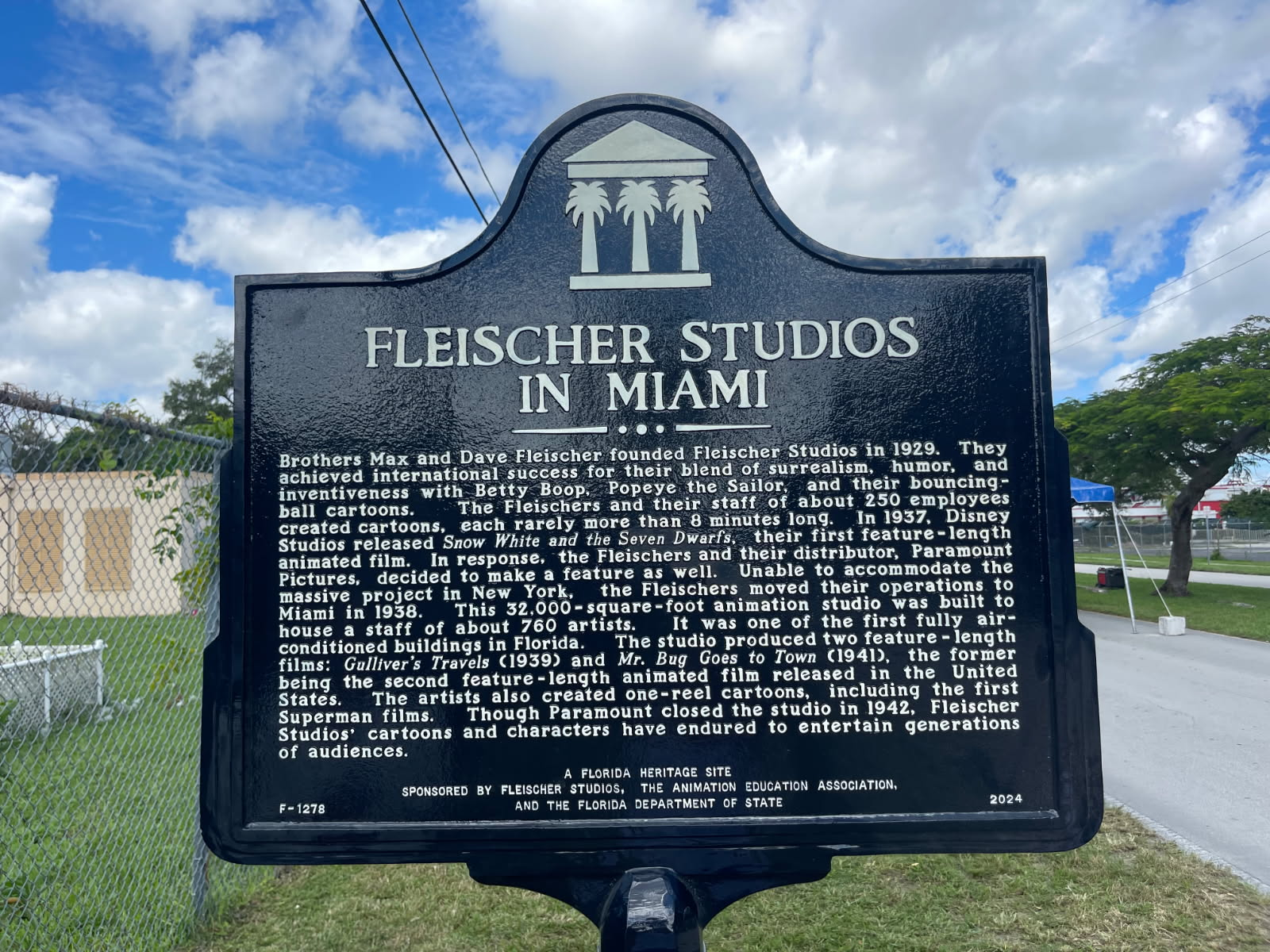
A historical marker in Miami for Fleischer Studios, the state's first animation studio.

The film industry in Florida is one of the largest in the United States: in 2006, Florida ranked third in the U.S. for film production (after California and New York) based on revenue generated. However, more recent 2009–2010 data no longer show Florida among the top four states.

Production activity has been generally concentrated in two regions, South Florida and Central Florida (Orlando and Tampa). The South Florida region is famous for large projects like Jerry Bruckheimer's Bad Boys film series and Neal Moritz's 2 Fast 2 Furious. The Central Florida area has been featured in The Punisher, starring John Travolta, and Adam Sandler's The Waterboy.

The state of Florida has a long film history thanks to its year-round sunshine and moderate climate. Film classics were filmed throughout the state, such as Moon Over Miami (1941) and Esther Williams' Easy to Love (1953).

== History ==
The oldest known film shot in Florida was the Burial of the "Maine" Victims (1898) which captured the funeral procession in Key West for those died in the sinking of the USS Maine off the coast of Cuba. Other short newsreels were shot in Florida at this time such as the U.S. Calvary Supplies Unloading at Tampa, Florida (1898). From approximately 1908 to 1918, Jacksonville and north Florida was a major hub for motion pictures. Jacksonville became a major hub for the motion picture industry starting in the winter of 1908 with the arrival of the Kalem Company. Kalem went to Florida to take advantage of the state's climate. Early motion picture film had a low sensitivity and powerful studio lights had not yet been invented. This required early motion pictures to be shot in sunlight. The cold weather and short days in New York and New Jersey's winters promoted film makers to explore places for warmer climates such as Florida. Some of the films produced by Kalem during its arrival in Jacksonville include A Florida Feud (1909) and The Cracker's Bride (1909) among others in its Sunny South series.

Kalem's success in Jacksonville prompted other companies associated with the Motion Picture Patents Company (MPPC) along with other independent filmmakers to move to Florida. During the region's brief boom as a major hub for the motion picture industry, from 1910 to 1917 more films were produced in north Florida than in southern California. North Florida's status as a film center began collapsing in late 1915 with the Supreme Court decision against the MPPC for violating the Anti-Trust Act. Since many of the film companies in Florida at this time were associated with the MPPC they faced some financial difficulties following the decision. North Florida's film industry cratered in 1917 with the election of Governor Sidney Catts and the election of John W. Martin who became mayor of Jacksonville. Financial stagnation from the Catts administration along with Catts's anti-Semitic, anti-Catholic, and xenophobic rhetoric caused many filmmakers to look elsewhere to produce films and caused studios to cancel plans to build in Jacksonville. The exodus of filmmakers and construction cancellations caused Florida banks to refuse loans to other filmmakers. This coupled with rationing resulting from American entry into World War I put an end to north Florida's status as a motion picture powerhouse by 1918.

Although north Florida's film industry had collapsed, it was not completely gone. Filmmaker Richard E. Norman moved to Jacksonville in 1919 to begin making race films, films with a predominantly Black cast and made for a Black audience. After a brief stint in Oklahoma, he returned to Jacksonville in 1922 and purchased the abandoned Eagle Studios which was built during the initial boom in Florida filmmaking. Here, Norman established Norman Studios which continued to produce race films. Three feature-length films were produced at Norman Studios in Jacksonville which include: Regeneration (1923), A Debtor to the Law (1924), and The Flying Ace (1926). The last film produced by Norman Studios was 1928's Black Gold. Despite the popularity of the films, a failed investment into film sound technology forced the studio close; however, Norman and his wife remained in the film industry by touring the state and showing films and even later opening theaters for Black audiences in central Florida. The Norman Studios facility became a National Historic Landmark in 2016.

During the Florida Land Boom of the 1920s, excitement in Florida's development along with unregulated speculation lead to large number of planned cities and communities which never materialized. Some of these planned communities were based on various themes or with a focus on a specific industry, including filmmaking. Two notable examples of these planned motion picture cities meant to rival Hollywood include Picture City, located in Hobe Sound, and Sun City, located in southern Hillsborough County. Despite the promises of their respective developers, these cities were never fully realized.

== Orlando ==
In the early 1990s Orlando experienced a great boom in film production. The construction of the Disney-MGM Studios and Universal Studios production facilities attracted many filmmakers to the area. Films like Ron Howard's Parenthood and syndicated television shows like The Adventures of Superboy led the pack. Soon, the Steven Spielberg series seaQuest DSV and Tom Hanks' From the Earth to the Moon called Florida home. Nickelodeon Studios operated within Universal Studios Florida. During this period Orlando acquired the nickname "Hollywood East" because of its surging film industry.

Just as film production appeared to be on the decline in Florida, the phenomenal success of 1998's The Blair Witch Project led to another boom. While this film was filmed in Maryland, its director and entire crew were University of Central Florida film school graduates. This cult independent film has led to a new wave of film production for the area.

== Films shot in Florida ==
=== Feature films shot in North Florida (Pensacola, Navarre, Ocala, Jacksonville regions) ===
- Kruel (2014)
- The Year of Getting to Know Us (2008)
- Lonely Hearts (2006)
- Ruby in Paradise (1993)
- Doc Hollywood (1991)
- Brenda Starr (1989)
- Blood Rage (1987)
- Cross Creek (1983)
- Jaws 2 (1978)
- Night Moves (1975)
- Tarzan and the Brown Prince (1972)
- Frogs (1972)
- Follow That Dream (1962)
- Revenge of the Creature (1955)
- Creature from the Black Lagoon (1954)
- Distant Drums (1951)
- The Yearling (1946)

=== Feature films shot in Central Florida (Orlando/Tampa region) ===
- After Midnight (2019)
- Crawl (2019)
- The Florida Project (2017)
- Monty Comes Back (2016)
- Spring Breakers (2013)
- Tomorrowland (2015)
- Charlie (2013)
- Letters to God (2010)
- RoboDoc (2008)
- Never Back Down (2008)
- Bring It On: All or Nothing (2007)
- Bring It On In It To Win It (2007)
- Sydney White (2007)
- Loren Cass (2006)
- Larry the Cable Guy: Health Inspector (2006)
- Altered (2006)
- The Punisher (2004)
- Monster (2003)
- Florida City (2003)
- Ocean's Eleven (2001)
- Olive Juice (2001)
- Held for Ransom (2000)
- Alligator Alley (2000)
- Walking Across Egypt (1999)
- Instinct (1999)
- Deuce Bigalow: Male Gigolo (1999)
- The Waterboy (1998)
- Rosewood (1997)
- Ulee's Gold (1997)
- Trekkies (1997)
- Marvin's Room (1996)
- Apollo 13 (1995)
- Cop and a Half (1993)
- Lethal Weapon 3 (1992)
- Passenger 57 (1992)
- Problem Child 2 (1991)
- Edward Scissorhands (1990)
- Quick Change (1990)
- Days of Thunder (1990)
- Parenthood (1989)
- Ernest Saves Christmas (1989)
- Cocoon (1985)
- D.A.R.Y.L. (1985)
- Jaws 3-D (1983)
- Ghost Story (1981)
- Honky Tonk Freeway (1981)
- Moonraker (1979)
- Treasure of Matecumbe (1976)
- Deathdream (1974)
- Johnny Tiger (1966)
- Two Thousand Maniacs! (1964)
- Easy to Love (1953)
- Beneath the 12-Mile Reef (1953)
- The Greatest Show on Earth (1952)
- Neptune's Daughter (1949)
- Mr. Peabody and the Mermaid (1948)
- On an Island with You (1948)

=== Feature films shot in South Florida (Miami region) ===
- Waves (2019)
- Moonlight (2016)
- Pain and Gain (2013)
- Iron Man 3 (2013)
- Marley and Me (2008)
- Miami Vice (2006)
- Transporter 2 (2005)
- Red Eye (2005)
- Meet the Fockers (2004)
- Stuck on You (2003)
- Bad Boys II (2003)
- Out of Time (2003)
- 2 Fast 2 Furious (2003)
- Wild Things (1998)
- There's Something About Mary (1997)
- The Birdcage (1996)
- Bad Boys (1995)
- Fair Game (1995)
- Get Shorty (1995)
- Just Cause (1995)
- The Specialist (1994)
- Drop Zone (1994)
- Ace Ventura: Pet Detective (1994)
- Salt on Our Skin (1992)
- Miami Blues (1990)
- Licence to Kill (1989)
- Married to the Mob (1988)
- Flight of the Navigator (1986)
- The Mean Season (1985)
- Monster Shark (1984)
- Harry & Son (1984)
- Scarface (1983)
- Body Heat (1981)
- Eyes of a Stranger (1981)
- The Dogs of War (1980)
- Caddyshack (1980)
- Empire of the Ants (1978)
- Black Sunday (1977)
- The Godfather Part II (1974)
- Salty (1973)
- Case of the Full Moon Murders (1973)
- Little Laura and Big John (1973)
- The Filthiest Show in Town (1972)
- How Do I Love Thee? (1970)
- Gentle Giant (1967)
- Tony Rome (1967)
- The Fat Spy (1966)
- Thunderball (1965)
- Girl Happy (1965)
- Goldfinger (1964)
- Safe at Home! (1962)
- Where the Boys Are (1960)
- The Bellboy (1960)
- Wind Across the Everglades (1958)
- Beneath the 12-Mile Reef (1953)
- Seminole (1953)
- Key Largo (1948)
- Moon Over Miami (1941)

=== Documentary films shot in Florida ===
- Vernon, Florida (1981)
- Gates of Heaven (1980)

== TV shows shot in Florida ==
=== Florida-based narrative TV series ===
- The Adventures of Superboy (1988–1990)
- Bloodline (2015–2017)
- Burn Notice (2007–2013)
- Flipper (1964–1967)
- The Glades (2010–2013)
- Miami Vice (1984–1990)
- Mortal Kombat: Conquest (1998)
- Seaquest DSV (1993–1995)
- South Beach Tow (2011–2014)
- Super Force (1989–1990)
- Swamp Thing (1990)
- Thunder in Paradise (1994)

=== Florida-based documentary/reality shows and independent shorts ===
- Carpocolypse (2005 sports reality show)
- The Chad Effect (2001 independent short)
- Dr. G: Inside the Caylee Anthony Case (2012 documentary TV special)
- Dr G Medical Examiner (2004- docu-drama)
- Gainesville (2015- reality show)
- Garriage: A Documentary in 4 Chapters and an Epilogue (2004 documentary)
- Hogan Knows Best (2005- reality show)
- Making the Band (2000 reality show)
- On Being Your Average Joe (2005 independent short)
- The Paper Route (1999 independent short)
- Skating's Next Star (2006 competition reality show)
- WWF: Raw Is War (1997 sports show)
- How to Do Florida (2010–present)

== Film festivals hosted in Florida ==
- American Black Film Festival
- Central Florida Film and Video Festival
- Florida Film Festival
- Fort Lauderdale International Film Festival (and its subsidiary Jury Award)
- Gasparilla International Film Festival (GIFF) (Tampa Bay)
- Hispanic Film Festival of Miami
- The Humphrey Bogart Film Festival
- India International Film Festival (IIFF) of Tampa Bay
- Jacksonville Film Festival
- L-DUB Film Festival (Lake Worth Playhouse)
- Miami International Film Festival
- Miami Short Film Festival
- Palm Beach International Film Fest
- Sarasota Film Festival
- Tallahassee Film Festival

== Film commissions and offices ==
- Sarasota County Film and Entertainment Office-
- Film in Florida - official site of Governor's Office of Film and Entertainment
- Metro Orlando Film Office
- Miami-Dade Film Office
- Polk County Film Office
- Space Coast Film Commission
- Palm Beach County Film and Television Commission

== Orlando ==
Metro Orlando alone is home to more than 10 state-of-the-art sound stages, making it one of the largest working production facility centers outside of Los Angeles and New York. Complete studio and production services are available throughout Florida, including backlots that can double for just about any national or international locale, production office space and sound stages totaling more than 160,000 square feet (15,000 m^{2}).

- Adrenaline Films
- Green Slate Studios

== South Florida ==
- Broadcast Beat Studios - Fort Lauderdale

== See also ==
- Cinema of the United States
- Cinema of the world
- Florida Film Critics Circle
- List of films and television shows shot in Florida
