= Bisio =

Bisio may refer to:

== People ==
- Angelo Bollano Bisio (1918–1978), Italian footballer
- Claudio Bisio (born 1957), Italian actor, presenter, voice actor, comedian and writer
- Enrico Bisio (1934–2003), Italian field hockey player
- Michael Bisio (born 1955), American jazz double bass player, composer and bandleader
- Rick Bisio (born 1964), American writer and consultant

== Other ==
- Francavilla Bisio, comune (municipality) in the Province of Alessandria in the Italian region Piedmont
