= Nowacki =

Nowacki (feminine: Nowacka; plural: Nowaccy) is a Polish surname. Notable people with this surname include:

Feminine

- Barbara Nowacka (born 1975), Polish politician
- Izabela Jaruga-Nowacka (1950–2010), Polish politician
- Malgorzata Nowacka (born 1974), Canadian choreographer
- Oktawia Nowacka (born 1991), Polish modern pentathlete

Masculine

- Andrew Nowacki (born 1980), Canadian football player
- Andrzej Nowacki (born 1953), Polish artist
- Henryk Józef Nowacki (born 1946), Polish Vatican diplomat
- Jan Paweł Nowacki (1905–1979), Polish engineer
- Marcin Nowacki (born 1981), Polish footballer
- Witold Nowacki (1911–1986), Polish mathematician
