= Martin Hiller =

Martin Hiller may refer to:

- Martin Hiller (canoeist), German sprint canoeist
- Martin H. Hiller, American entrepreneur
