= Ilexhurst =

Coordinates: 27.4889°N 82.7067°W

Ilexhurst is a subdivision and former resort community on Anna Maria Island in Manatee County, Florida, United States. It is part of the Bradenton–Sarasota–Venice Metropolitan Statistical Area. The subdivision occupies the central part of Anna Maria Island. From 1953 to 1954, the community was split and annexed into the adjacent cities of Holmes Beach and Bradenton Beach.

== History ==
Ilexhurst was established in 1910 by Ruric E. Cobb, brother of Samuel Cobb, the earliest homesteader of the adjacent modern-day Holmes Beach. Ruric Cobb was a classically trained musician who would go on to teach music at Rollins College. One of the reasons Cobb was drawn to the location was due to an old artesian well that was believed to be part of an abandoned Spanish settlement. The well was known to fishermen who used it to replenish their water while boating around the island.

The planned community of Ilexhurst was very large, spanning almost the entirety from just south of the modern-day Manatee Avenue Bridge to the Cortez Bridge. It was intended to be a resort with a large club house, artesian wells, and premier amenities. According to Cobb’s niece, Anna Maria Cobb Riles, the community was named for the trees that grew there. The ilex genus (holly) refers to more than 400 species of evergreen and deciduous trees. Riles explained that the area was full of buttonwoods that they mistakenly called ilexes.

By 1913, Cobb had returned to teaching in central Florida and sold most of his interest in Ilexhurst to The Wall Realty Company. The company soon sold several cottage properties to mainlanders looking for a weekend beach home. However, the resort was negatively impacted by World War I. Initially supported by local German investors involved in the phosphate business, Ilexhurst suffered financially when many pulled out of the project and returned to Germany. In 1917, signs of Ilexhurst’s decline were already obvious. A visitor’s observations were listed in the Tampa Bay Times “a nicely located property, with a fine dock, and $7000 clubhouse that all seems destined to go to ruin unless taken hold of by someone.”

In 1921, the Ilexhurst property was acquired by a new real estate group and the area was replatted. The club house was renovated to also serve as a hotel. In 1924, the property was sold once again, now comprising 600 lots and the large clubhouse hotel. By 1927, it had changed hands once again. The Ilexhurst club house became property of the North Bradenton Beach Company, part of the Bradenton Beach development growing just south of Ilexhurst. The name of the clubhouse was changed to Gulf Beach Hotel and much of the southern end of the property in Ilexhurst was replatted once again under the name North Bradenton Beach.

Through the 1930s and 1940s, the community continued to grow with new single-family homes and a mobile home park. The Gulf Beach Hotel became known as the Ilexhurst Hotel in the 1930s and then the Gulf Park Hotel in the 1940s. It would eventually burn down in 1979.

In 1951, a proposal was defeated by public vote to incorporate Ilexhurst into the neighboring City of Bradenton Beach. The issue was brought up again in 1953 via petition, which required 75 percent of Ilexhurst residents to agree to be annexed into Bradenton Beach. That same year the issue was brought up again, this time to annex Ilexhurst into the City of Holmes Beach to the north. The annexation debate came to a head by the end of 1953, with Ilexhurst being split with an election calling for only the southern portion of Ilex\\hurst to become part of Bradenton Beach.

In November 1953, South Ilexhurst was annexed into Bradenton Beach. A few weeks later, Holmes Beach voted to annex the remaining portion of Ilexhurst. In February 1954, North Ilexhurst became part of the City of Holmes Beach.
