= Rosser Park =

Rosser Park may refer to:

- Rosser Park, also previously known as Rosser Park Botanic Gardens, now known as Gold Coast Regional Botanic Gardens
- Roser Park Historic District, a United States historic district located in St. Petersburg, Florida
