= Newtons (cookie) =

Fruit-paste filled cookie from Nabisco

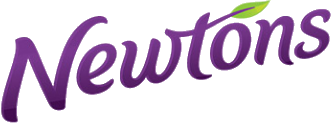

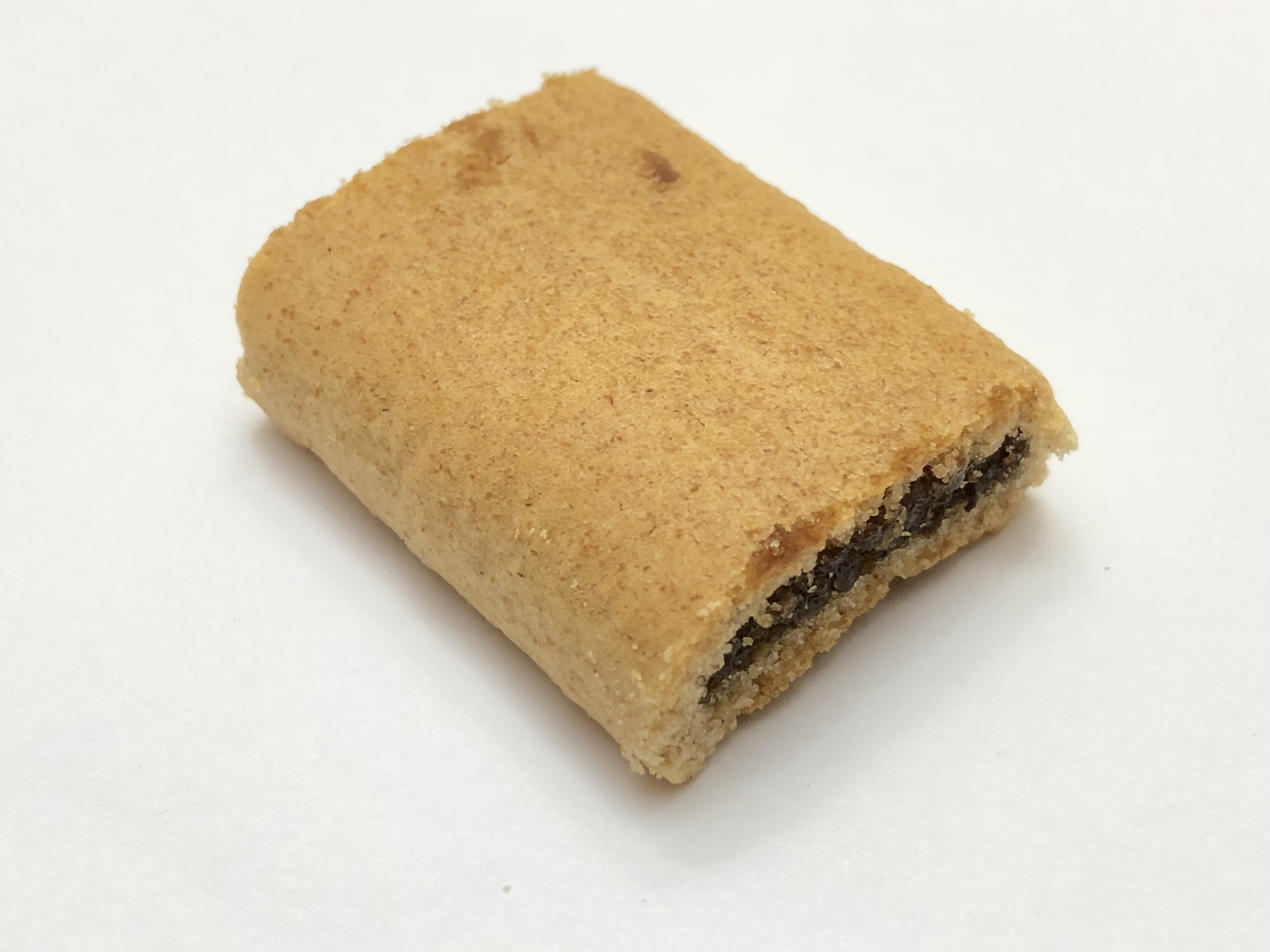
- Product type: Fig roll
- Current owner: Mondelez International
- Produced by: Nabisco
- Country: United States
- Introduced: 1891; 135 years ago
- Website: snackworks.com/newtons

Newtons are a Nabisco-trademarked version of a cookie filled with sweet fruit paste. Fig Newtons are the most popular variety. They are produced by an extrusion process. Their distinctive shape is a characteristic that has been adopted by competitors, including generic fig bars sold in many markets.

== History ==
The Newton was invented by Philadelphia baker Charles Roser, who likely took inspiration for the recipe from the fig roll, a baked good introduced to the U.S. by British immigrants. Roser used a machine invented by James Henry Mitchell which allowed for the extrusion of fig jam and cookie dough at the same time into a long, continuous roll. The recipe was sold to the Kennedy Biscuit company and entered mass production at the F. A. Kennedy Steam Bakery in 1891. The cookie was named the "Newton" by the plant manager, James Hazen, using the name of the Boston suburb of Newton, Massachusetts.

The Kennedy Biscuit Company was one of eight bakeries bought out by William Moore in 1889 to create the New York Biscuit Company. This company merged with the American Biscuit Company in 1898 to form the National Biscuit Company, or Nabisco. The recipe for Newtons along with the manufacturing machine were among the assets brought into the new company, and the cookies were trademarked as "Fig Newtons".

In 1991, Nabisco held a 100th-anniversary celebration of the cookie in the city of Newton, Massachusetts.

Since 2012, "Fig" has been dropped from the product name (now just "Newtons"). According to Nabisco, one reason this was done is that the cookie had long been available in other flavors, like strawberry, raspberry, and blueberry. Another reason was a general negative perception of figs and their association with "olde" things.

== Production ==
In 1991, Nabisco was producing around a billion Newtons per year, with the cookie generating $200 million in sales.

The cookie is Nabisco's third best-selling product, with sales of more than 700 million bars a year as of 2018.

=== Varieties ===
Original Fig Newtons were the only variety available until the 1980s. Apple Newtons appeared in 1984, as did Blueberry Newtons. Cherry Newtons were marketed by 1985, and Strawberry Newtons by 1986.

As of 2012, Nabisco makes several varieties of the Newton, which, in addition to the original fig filling, include versions filled with apple cinnamon, strawberry, raspberry, cherry, blueberry and mixed berry. The Fig Newton also is sold in a 100% whole-grain variety and a fat-free variety. Fig Newton Minis have also been introduced.

In 2011, a crisp cookie was introduced in the United States named Newtons Fruit Thins, after being successfully marketed by Kraft in Canada as Lifestyle Selections, a variety of Peek Freans. The product line has since been discontinued.

== In popular culture ==
In the 1939 promotional short Mickey's Surprise Party, produced by Walt Disney for Nabisco's exhibit at that year's World's Fair, Mickey Mouse proclaims the Fig Newton to be his favorite cookie.

== See also ==
- Fig cake
- Fig-cake (fruit)
