= Holmes Beach, Florida =

- City
- City of Holmes Beach
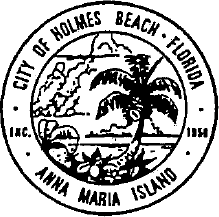
- Flag Seal

- Location in Manatee County and the state of Florida
- Coordinates: 27°30′18″N 82°42′38″W
- Country: United States
- State: Florida
- County: Manatee
- Settled: 1896
- Incorporated: March 13, 1950

Government
  - Type: Mayor-Commission
  - Mayor: Judy Titsworth
  - Vice Mayor: Carol Whitmore
  - Commissioners: Dan Diggins, Steve Oelfke, Jessica Patel, and Terry W. Schaefer
  - City Clerk: Marina Hovious
  - City Attorney: Erica Augello

Area
  - Total: 1.91 sq mi (4.95 km^{2})
  - Land: 1.68 sq mi (4.35 km^{2})
  - Water: 0.23 sq mi (0.60 km^{2})
- Elevation: 3 ft (0.91 m)

Population (2020)
  - Total: 3,010
  - Density: 1,794/sq mi (692.5/km^{2})
- Time zone: UTC-5 (Eastern (EST))
  - Summer (DST): UTC-4 (EDT)
- ZIP codes: 34217, 34218
- Area code: 941
- FIPS code: 12-32150
- GNIS feature ID: 2404720
- Website: holmesbeachfl.org

Holmes Beach is a city on Anna Maria Island in Manatee County, Florida, United States. As of the 2020 census, it had a population of 3,010, down from 3,836 at the 2010 census. It is part of the North Port-Bradenton-Sarasota, Florida Metropolitan Statistical Area.

== History ==
Holmes Beach's first non-indigenous settlers, Sam and Annie Cobb, homesteaded 160 acres (65 ha) on Anna Maria Island in 1896. Other prominent pioneers who joined them were, John R. Jones, who piloted boats between Tampa and Cuba, and Jose Casanas, an immigrant from the Canary Islands who came to the US to start a commercial fishing business for mullet. In 1902, the Cobbs opened a post office from their home.

Holmes Beach was named for John E. Holmes Sr., a property developer who first came to the area in 1907, when he was a railroad construction worker, and came back to build it into a planned community after World War II. During World War II, Holmes was stationed in Tampa. Holmes obtained the interest of three others, Frank B. Giles of Georgia, Pedar Mickelsen of Minnesota, and Francis Karel of Chicago, to help develop it. In 1947 or 1948 a small airport was built. One person had a plane at the airport and used it as an air taxi during the tourist season and was used by residents and visitors taking them to wherever they wanted to go.

In 1948, parts of the movie, "On an Island with You" were filmed in the Holmes Beach community, which featured actors such as Cyd Charisse, Jimmy Durante, Peter Lawford, Ricardo Montalban, and Esther Williams.

The City of Holmes Beach was officially incorporated as a municipality on March 13, 1950, during a meeting about incorporating with 46 voting in favor, 13 against and 1 in abstention. Opponents of incorporation argued that tax money from cigarettes and liquor sales would be lost along with county assistance for road maintenance. Those in favor of incorporation argued that it would be easier for lenders to finance new construction on the island and give local residents an equal weight for their voice in their own government. Despite a request not to use anyone's name, Holmes Beach was decided on, although names such as Palm City, Mid-Island Beach, Coquina Beach and Tarpon Beach were considered as well. At the end of the meeting the city's first officials were elected.

Manatee Public Beach located at the intersection of Manatee Avenue and Gulf Drive opened in 1952, originally as Manatee County Public Beach. It was managed by a local Kiwanis Club chapter, with all proceeds going to local charity-related initiatives. During the 1950s and 1960s, the beach was racially segregated like many others in the Southeastern United States. It is not clear, however, when the beach was officially desegregated. The beach was renamed "Manatee Beach" before being changed to Manatee Public Beach.

In 1954, Holmes Beach annexed the neighboring subdivision communities of Ilexhurst, Jones, and Casanas, bringing the entirety of Anna Maria Island under municipal governments.

An airport that had existed closed in 1973 because of the cost to maintain it and that it needed improvements. Between 1975 and 1980, the airport land was redeveloped by the municipal government.

== Geography ==
According to the United States Census Bureau, the city has a total area of 1.91 square miles (4.9 km^{2}), of which 1.68 square miles (4.4 km^{2}) are land and 0.23 square miles (0.60 km^{2}), or 12.19%, are water.

The city occupies the central part of Anna Maria Island and is one of three municipalities on the island. The others are Bradenton Beach in the south and Anna Maria in the north.

=== Key Royale ===
Included in the city limits is the adjacent bayside island of Key Royale, formerly known as School Key. It was uninhabited until 1960, when a bridge was built joining it to the Holmes Beach section of Anna Maria Island; development then began.

=== Climate ===
The city of Holmes Beach is part of the humid subtropical climate zone with a Köppen Climate Classification of "Cfa" (C = mild temperate, f = fully humid, and a = hot summer).

== Demographics ==
Historical population
Census	Pop.	Note	%±
1950	137		—
1960	1,143		734.3%
1970	2,699		136.1%
1980	4,018		48.9%
1990	4,810		19.7%
2000	4,966		3.2%
2010	3,836		−22.8%
2020	3,010		−21.5%
U.S. Decennial Census

=== Racial and ethnic composition ===
Holmes Beach racial composition (Hispanics excluded from racial categories) (NH = Non-Hispanic)
Race	Pop 2010	Pop 2020	% 2010	% 2020
White (NH)	3,663	2,769	95.49%	91.99%
Black or African American (NH)	3	5	0.08%	0.17%
Native American or Alaska Native (NH)	12	4	0.31%	0.13%
Asian (NH)	28	31	0.73%	1.03%
Pacific Islander or Native Hawaiian (NH)	0	0	0.00%	0.00%
Some other race (NH)	6	5	0.16%	0.17%
Two or more races/Multiracial (NH)	20	93	0.52%	3.09%
Hispanic or Latino (any race)	104	103	2.71%	3.42%
Total	3,836	3,010	100.00%	100.00%

=== 2020 census ===
As of the 2020 census, Holmes Beach had a population of 3,010. The median age was 64.7 years. 6.3% of residents were under the age of 18 and 49.1% of residents were 65 years of age or older. For every 100 females there were 91.0 males, and for every 100 females age 18 and over there were 90.0 males age 18 and over.

As of 2020, 100.0% of residents lived in urban areas, while 0.0% lived in rural areas.

In 2020, there were 1,632 households in Holmes Beach, of which 9.1% had children under the age of 18 living in them. Of all households, 52.0% were married-couple households, 16.9% were households with a male householder and no spouse or partner present, and 26.0% were households with a female householder and no spouse or partner present. About 34.7% of all households were made up of individuals and 23.0% had someone living alone who was 65 years of age or older.

In 2020, there were 4,196 housing units, of which 61.1% were vacant. The homeowner vacancy rate was 2.9% and the rental vacancy rate was 73.3%.

According to the 2020 American Community Survey 5-year estimates, there were 1,329 families residing in the city.

=== 2010 census ===
As of the 2010 United States census, there were 3,836 people, 2,172 households, and 1,084 families residing in the city.

=== 2000 census ===
As of the 2000 U.S. census, there were 4,966 people in 2,538 households, including 1,482 families, in the city. The population density was 3,063.5 inhabitants per square mile (1,182.8/km^{2}). There were 4,202 housing units at an average density of 2,592.2 per square mile (1,000.9/km^{2}). The racial makeup of the city was 98.59% White, 0.12% African American, 0.12% Native American, 0.28% Asian, 0.08% Pacific Islander, 0.22% from other races, and 0.58% from two or more races. Hispanic or Latino of any race were 1.65% of the population.

Of the 2,538 households in 2000, 13.7% had children under the age of 18 living with them, 49.2% were married couples living together, 6.5% had a female householder with no husband present, and 41.6% were non-families. 34.0% of households were one person and 17.8% were one person aged 65 or older. The average household size was 1.96 and the average family size was 2.44.

In 2000, the age distribution was 12.9% under the age of 18, 2.8% from 18 to 24, 20.1% from 25 to 44, 31.0% from 45 to 64, and 33.2% 65 or older. The median age was 54 years. For every 100 females, there were 90.3 males. For every 100 females age 18 and over, there were 88.3 males.

In 2000, the median household income was $45,074 and the median family income was $55,669. Males had a median income of $30,778 versus $25,825 for females. The per capita income for the city was $31,345. About 1.2% of families and 3.6% of the population were below the poverty line, including 2.3% of those under age 18 and 1.3% of those age 65 or over.

== Notable people ==
- Kathleen Flinn, author
- Kit Klein, speed skater
- Don Maloney, author
- John B. Roe (1942–2020), member of the Illinois Senate
