= F. A. Kennedy Steam Bakery =

- U.S. National Register of Historic Places
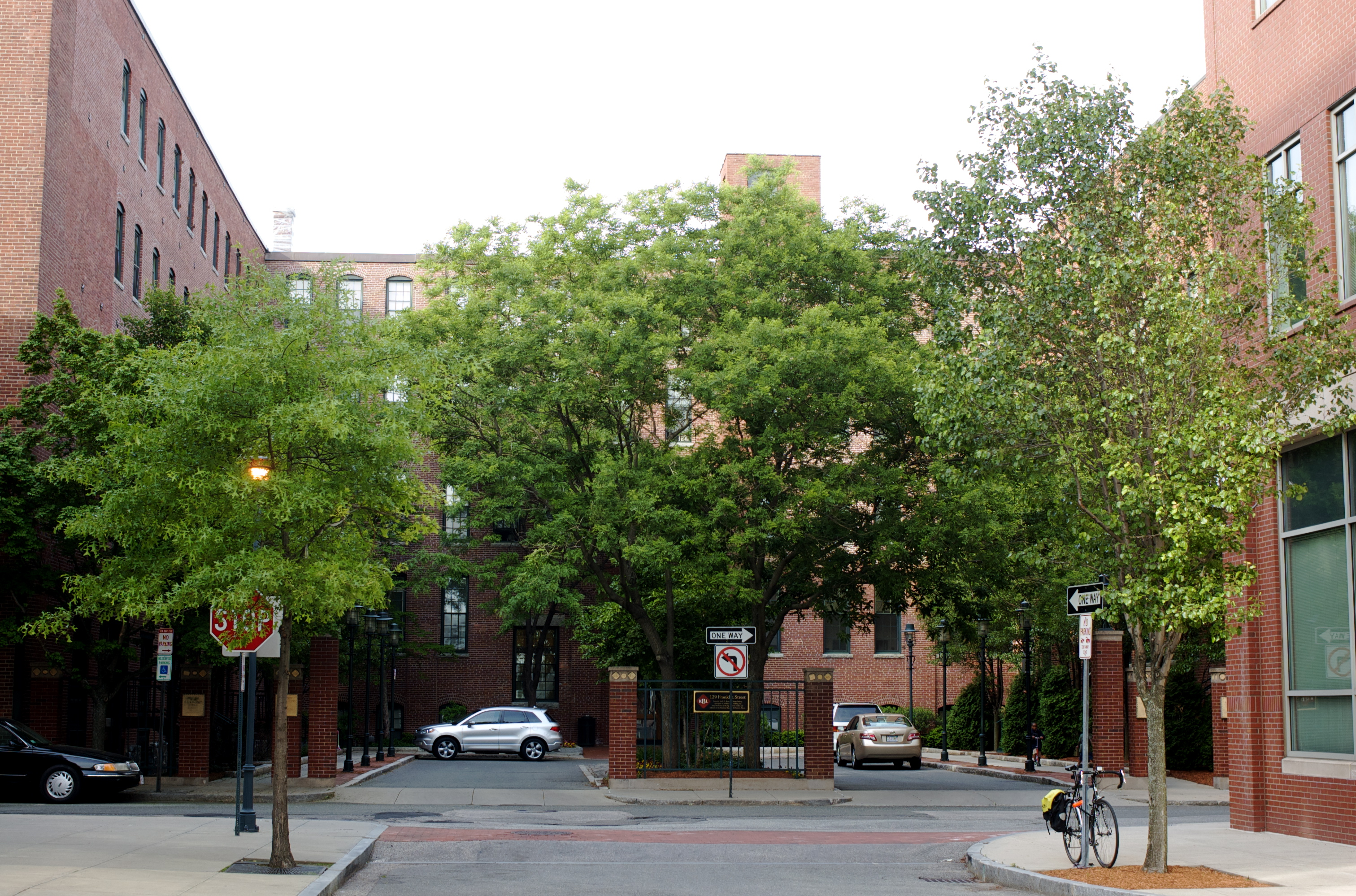

- Location within Massachusetts Location within the United States
- Location: Cambridge, Massachusetts
- Coordinates: 42°21′46″N 71°06′05″W
- Built: 1875
- Architect: F.G. Cass
- NRHP reference No.: 89002285
- Added to NRHP: January 4, 1990

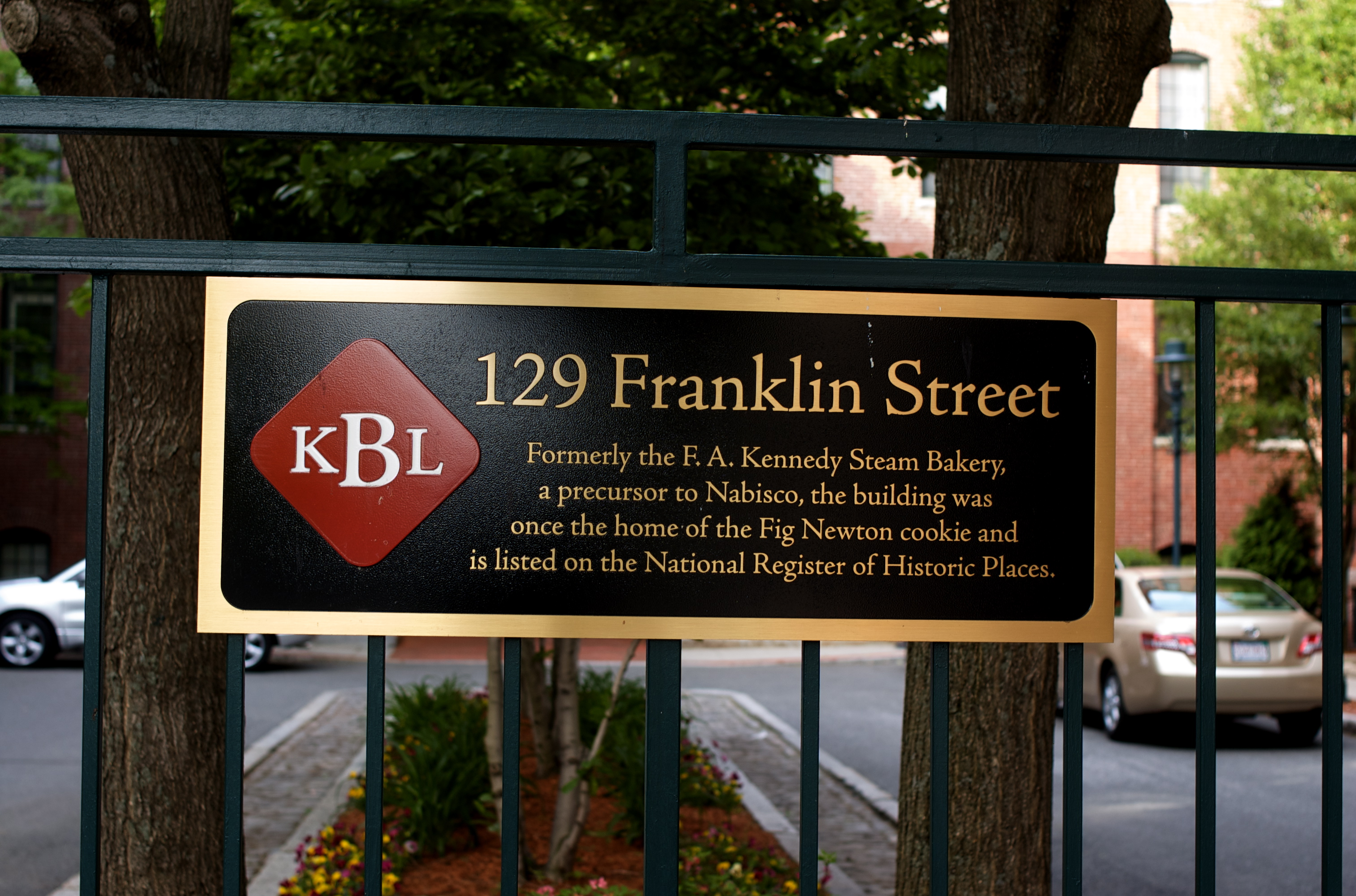
The plaque outside of 129 Franklin Street, identifying it as the site of the F.A. Kennedy Steam Bakery

The F. A. Kennedy Steam Bakery is a historic bakery at 129 Franklin Street in Cambridge, Massachusetts, that first produced the Fig Newton in 1891.

== History ==
The building was constructed in 1875. The well-known baked good that originated at the Kennedy Steam Bakery was the Fig Newtons. The bakery was purchased by Nabisco and later converted into an apartment building that is part of the University Park at MIT development. The Bakery building was added to the National Register of Historic Places in 1990.

== See also ==
- National Register of Historic Places listings in Cambridge, Massachusetts
