= Charles Roser =

American real estate developer (1864–1937)

- Born: November 16, 1864; Elyria, Ohio, United States
- Died: April 12, 1937 (aged 72); St. Petersburg, Florida, United States
- Occupations: Businessman, real estate developer and philanthropist.
- Known for: Creating the Fig Newton, developing Roser Park Historic District and Anna Maria Island

Charles Martin Roser (November 16, 1864 – April 12, 1937), also known as C. M. Roser, was an Ohio food maker, Florida real estate developer and philanthropist. He was born in Elyria, Ohio and died in St. Petersburg, Florida.

== Early career in Ohio ==
Charles Roser had part interest in a cheese business in Wellington, Ohio, before he went into the business of making candy and cookies in Kenton, Ohio. The cookie business became part of what is now Nabisco in the 1890s. Roser is credited by some with having invented the Fig Newton (actually a pastry) or at least the process or machinery to make it, but Nabisco has never acknowledged these claims. In any event Roser left his cookie business a very rich man.

== Later career in Florida ==
In the early part of the 20th century Roser and his wife, Ruth, arrived in St. Petersburg where he built several hotels downtown as well as an office building and cafeteria on Central Avenue. He opened his C. M. Roser Real Estate office at 695 Central Avenue in the building he had built. Roser also built and donated a nurse's home for Mound Park Hospital as well as the first building for Mercy Hospital.

=== Roser Park in St. Petersburg ===
Unlike other local residential developers who started with large tracts of land, Roser slowly acquired the parcels he needed to create his Roser Park subdivision, which is now recognized as the Roser Park Historic District. He had the streets and sidewalks there paved with brick, which was quite expensive then. He built his own large house there and donated lands for a school and parks.

=== Anna Maria in Manatee County ===
On the northern end of the Gulf Coast island of Anna Maria in Manatee County, though, Roser had the opportunity to develop an entire community, which is now the City of Anna Maria. In 1892, George Emerson Bean had homesteaded the northern 160 acres (0.65 km^{2}) of Anna Maria Island and became the island's first resident. Bean died in 1898 and his son, George Wilhelm Bean, inherited the property. In the early part of the 20th century, Charles Roser came down from St. Petersburg and partnered with him to form the Anna Maria Beach Company to develop the property by laying out streets and selling lots. Since the only access to the island then was by boat, Roser built a pier in 1911 at the end of Pine Avenue which jutted 678 feet (207 m) out into Tampa Bay to accommodate the boats bringing the expected influx of visitors and potential residents. Roser had a real estate office within easy walking distance of the pier on the south side of Pine Avenue. In 1913 as a memorial to his mother, he built Roser Memorial Community Church, which was the first church on the island. It has been enlarged and still serves the people of Anna Maria Island. Today Anna Maria is a residential community as well as a year-round vacation resort.
