= The Octoroon (1909 film) =

1909 film by Sidney Olcott

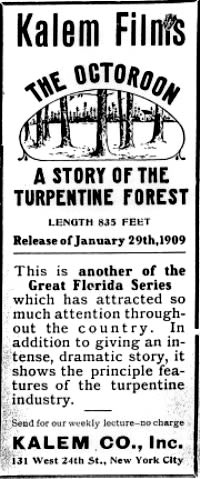
- Directed by: Sidney Olcott
- Produced by: Sidney Olcott
- Production company: Kalem Company
- Distributed by: General Film Company
- Release date: January 29, 1909
- Running time: 835 ft
- Country: United States
- Languages: Silent film (English intertitles)

The Octoroon is a lost 1909 American silent film produced by Kalem Company and directed by Sidney Olcott, shot in Florida. It was part of Kalem's Great Florida Series that also included A Florida Feud.

== Production notes ==
The film was shot in Jacksonville, Florida.

Other title : A Story of the Turpentine Forest

== Bibliography ==
- The Moving Picture World vol 4 n°1, p 11; p 533.
- The New York Dramatic Mirror, 1909, January 9, p 9; January 16, p 7.
