= Anna Maria, Florida =

- City
- City of Anna Maria
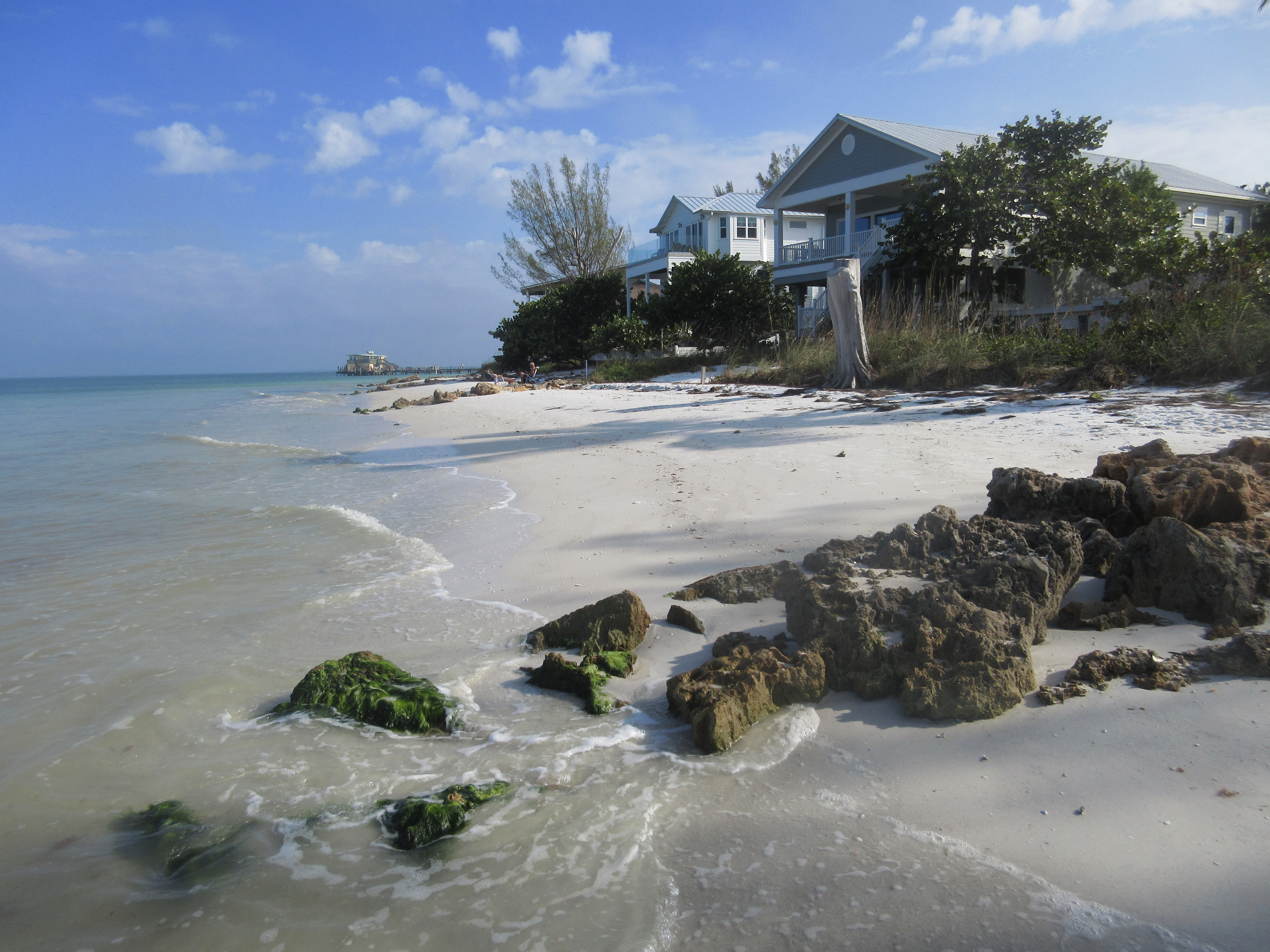
- Beachfront homes in Anna Maria

- Seal

- Location in Manatee County, Florida
- Coordinates: 27°31′47″N 82°44′03″W
- Country: United States
- State: Florida
- County: Manatee
- Settled: 1893
- Incorporated: 1923

Government
  - Type: Mayor-Commission
  - Mayor: Mark Short
  - Vice Mayor: Charles Salem
  - Commissioners: John Lynch, Gary McMullen, Kathleen Morgan-Johnson, and Christopher Arendt
  - City Clerk: Amber M. LaRowe
  - City Attorney: Gretchen Vose

Area
  - Total: 0.86 sq mi (2.23 km^{2})
  - Land: 0.73 sq mi (1.90 km^{2})
  - Water: 0.12 sq mi (0.32 km^{2})
- Elevation: 3 ft (0.91 m)

Population (2020)
  - Total: 968
  - Density: 1,316.4/sq mi (508.26/km^{2})
- Time zone: UTC-5 (Eastern (EST))
  - Summer (DST): UTC-4 (EDT)
- ZIP code: 34216
- Area code: 941
- FIPS code: 12-01475
- GNIS feature ID: 2403100
- Website: www.cityofannamaria.com

Anna Maria is a city in Manatee County, Florida, United States. Anna Maria is part of the North Port-Bradenton-Sarasota, Florida Metropolitan Statistical Area. The population was 968 at the 2020 census, down from 1,503 in 2010.

The city occupies the northern part of Anna Maria Island and is one of three municipalities on the island. The others are Holmes Beach in the center and Bradenton Beach in the south.

== Etymology ==
Former Tampa Mayor Madison Post (1818-1867) named the island for his wife Maria and his sister-in-law Anna.

In the past, pronunciation of the name differed: old timers said "Anna Mar-EYE-a," but most people today say "Anna Mar-EE-a."

== History ==
In 1893, George Emerson Bean built a home near the present day Rod & Reel Pier. Two years later in 1895, he filed a homesteaded claim of 160 acres (0.65 km^{2}) on the north part of Anna Maria Island. Prior to Bean's homestead claim, Andrew Gowanlack would reside in the area where Bean would file his homestead at. However, Andrew never filed for a homestead claim but did receive three acres of land after Bean filed his homestead claim out of squatting rights. After George Bean's death in 1898, the land went to his son, George Wilhelm Bean, who partnered with Charles Roser, a wealthy real estate developer from St. Petersburg, to form the Anna Maria Beach Company to develop the area.

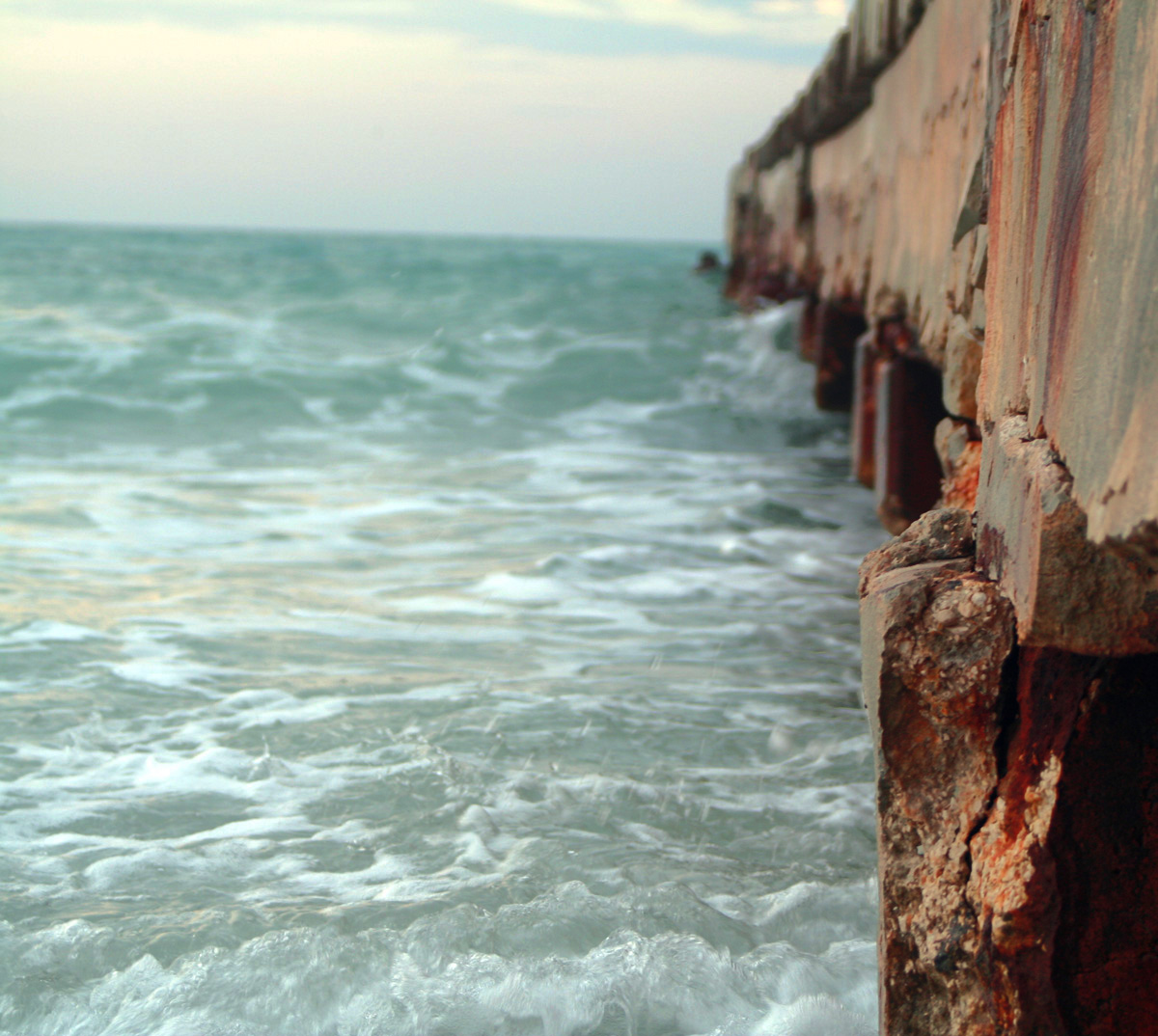
An erosion prevention pier in the city

In 1911, the Anna Maria City Pier would be built by the Anna Maria Beach Company to accommodate steamships carrying residents and visitors to the island. The pier would have several buildings attached to it. An extension of the pier containing a home would be built in 1913 before the area the house was on in the pier was destroyed in September 1927.

The City of Anna Maria was officially incorporated as a municipality in 1923.

Sometime during 1927, a jail would be built as a form of containment for bar patrons who were rowdy and was used until 1940 when a fire would burn down its roof and cells.

Compiled in the late 1930s and first published in 1939, the Florida Guide listed Anna Maria's population as 77 describing it as:

a resort at the northern extremity of Anna Maria Key, consists of many cottages in a jungle setting.

— Federal Writers' Project, "Part III: The Florida Loop", Florida; a guide to the southernmost state (1947)

Bradenton would attempt to annex the City of Anna Maria in 1963. Anna Maria would hold a special election that was described as being "non-official" on April 2, 1963, to confirm Bradenton's decision. However, it would not be approved as 297 voted against it while 9 voted in favor of it.

During Hurricane Irma in 2017, the city pier was damaged significantly. It was demolished the following year with plans to rebuild it. The historic city pier was rebuilt and opened in April 2020. The new pier, however, was also damaged significantly by Hurricane Milton in 2024.

== Geography ==
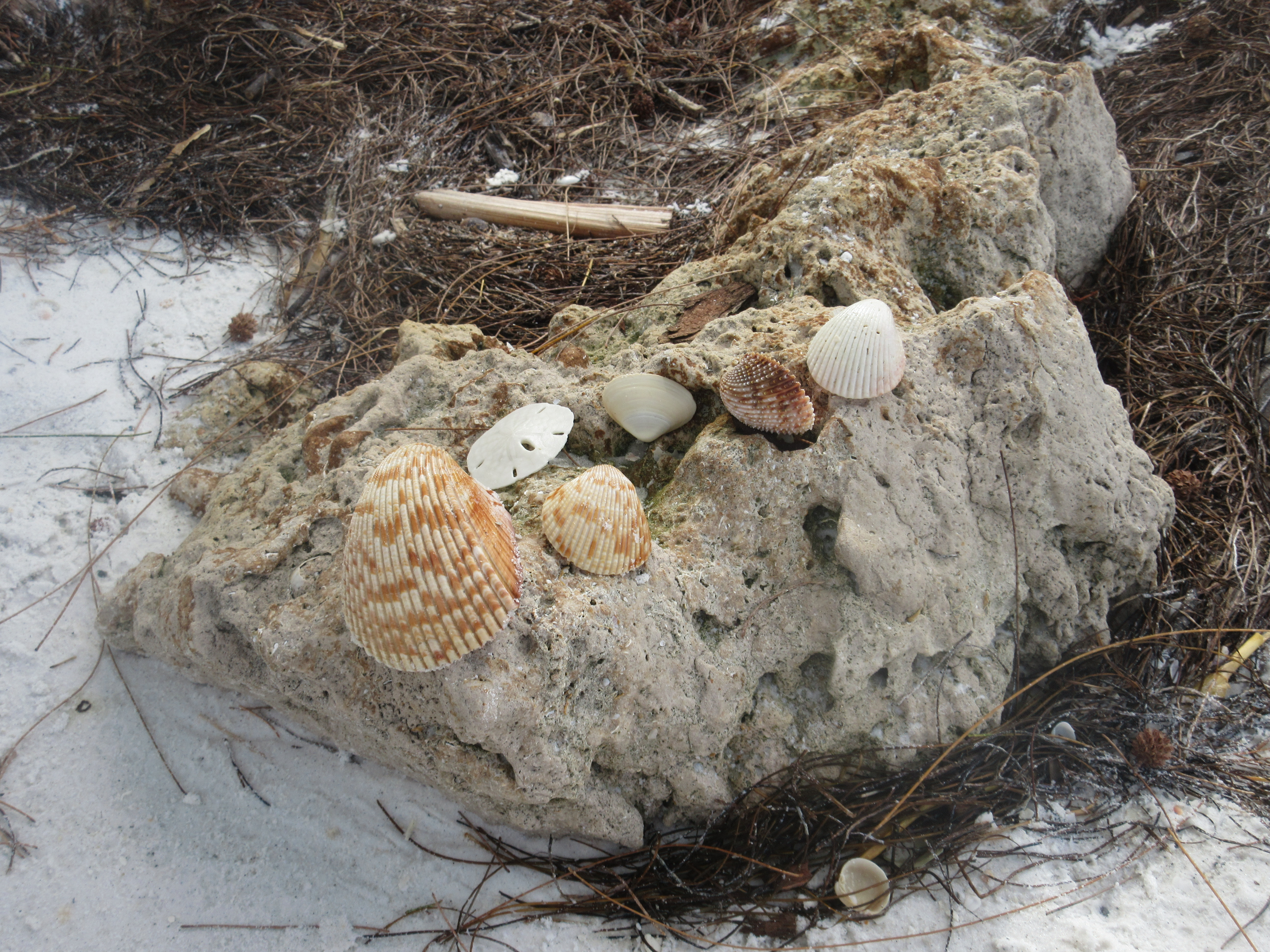
Shelling is popular on the beaches of Anna Maria.

Anna Maria is the westernmost community in Manatee County. It is bordered to the southwest by the Gulf of Mexico and to the northeast by Tampa Bay, connected to the Gulf by Passage Key Inlet at the northwest end of the island. The city is bordered to the southeast by Holmes Beach. Bradenton is 11 miles (18 km) to the east via Florida State Road 64 from Holmes Beach.

According to the United States Census Bureau, the city of Anna Maria has a total area of 0.86 square miles (2.23 km^{2}), of which 0.74 square miles (1.92 km^{2}) are land and 0.12 square miles (0.31 km^{2}), or 14.53%, are water.

=== Climate ===
The climate in this area is characterized by hot, humid summers and generally mild winters. According to the Köppen climate classification, the City of Anna Maria has a humid subtropical climate zone (Cfa).

== Demographics ==
Historical population
Census	Pop.	Note	%±
1930	77		—
1940	158		105.2%
1950	345		118.4%
1960	690		100.0%
1970	1,137		64.8%
1980	1,537		35.2%
1990	1,744		13.5%
2000	1,814		4.0%
2010	1,503		−17.1%
2020	968		−35.6%
U.S. Decennial Census

=== 2010 and 2020 census ===
Anna Maria racial composition (Hispanics excluded from racial categories) (NH = Non-Hispanic)
Race	Pop 2010	Pop 2020	% 2010	% 2020
White (NH)	1,426	902	94.88%	93.18%
Black or African American (NH)	3	3	0.20%	0.31%
Native American or Alaska Native (NH)	11	0	0.73%	0.00%
Asian (NH)	8	7	0.53%	0.72%
Pacific Islander or Native Hawaiian (NH)	1	0	0.07%	0.00%
Some other race (NH)	1	1	0.07%	0.10%
Two or more races/Multiracial (NH)	7	25	0.47%	2.58%
Hispanic or Latino (any race)	46	30	3.06%	3.10%
Total	1,503	968		

As of the 2020 United States census, there were 968 people, 607 households, and 350 families residing in the city.

As of the 2010 United States census, there were 1,503 people, 688 households, and 412 families residing in the city.

=== 2000 census ===
As of the census of 2000, there were 1,814 people, 897 households, and 572 families residing in the city. The population density was 2,338.3 inhabitants per square mile (902.8/km^{2}). There were 1,538 housing units at an average density of 1,982.6 per square mile (765.5/km^{2}). The racial makeup of the city was 98.18% White, 0.33% African American, 0.11% Native American, 0.28% Asian, 0.44% from other races, and 0.66% from two or more races. Hispanic or Latino of any race were 2.48% of the population.

In 2000, there were 897 households, out of which 14.3% had children under the age of 18 living with them, 55.4% were married couples living together, 6.5% had a female householder with no husband present, and 36.2% were non-families. 29.9% of all households were made up of individuals, and 16.4% had someone living alone who was 65 years of age or older. The average household size was 2.02 and the average family size was 2.46.

In 2000, in the city, the population was spread out, with 12.5% under the age of 18, 3.3% from 18 to 24, 14.9% from 25 to 44, 36.2% from 45 to 64, and 33.2% who were 65 years of age or older. The median age was 56 years. For every 100 females, there were 90.3 males. For every 100 females age 18 and over, there were 88.3 males.

In 2000, the median income for a household in the city was $40,341, and the median income for a family was $51,628. Males had a median income of $40,125 versus $24,934 for females. The per capita income for the city was $28,767. About 10.8% of families and 10.5% of the population were below the poverty line, including 13.1% of those under age 18 and 14.7% of those age 65 or over. The average value of a single-family residential home in the city is over $1.8 Million Dollars.
