= Roser Park Historic District =

Historic district in Florida, United States

- U.S. National Register of Historic Places
- U.S. Historic district
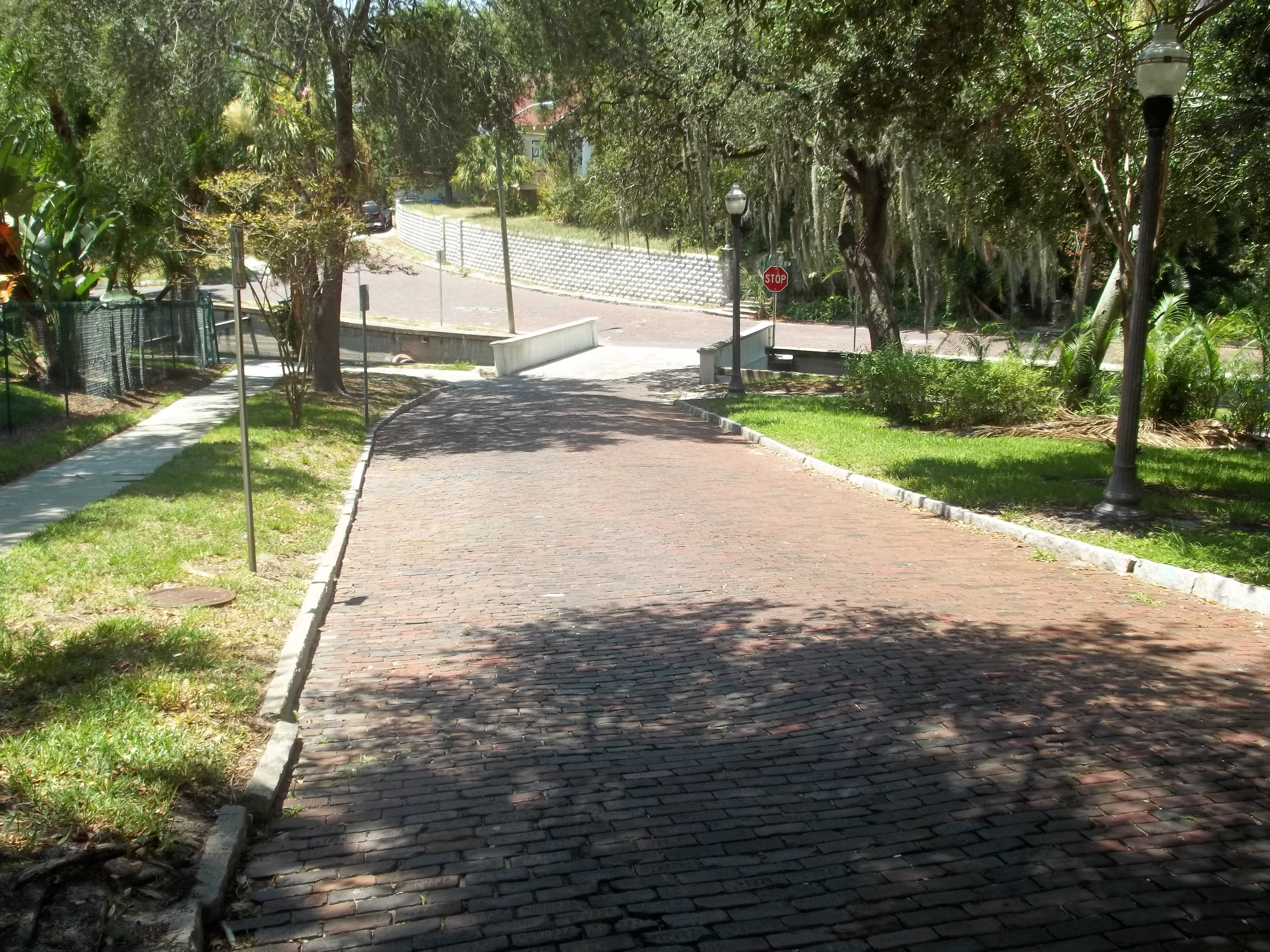

- Location within Florida Location within the United States
- Location: St. Petersburg, Florida
- Coordinates: 27°45′35″N 82°38′31″W
- Area: 270 acres (1.1 km^{2})
- NRHP reference No.: 98000295
- Added to NRHP: April 1, 1998

The Roser Park Historic District is a U.S. historic district (designated as such on April 1, 1998) located in St. Petersburg, Florida. The district is bounded by 5th and 9th Streets S, and 6th and 11th Avenues S. It contains 146 historic buildings.

Roser Park was developed in the early years of the 20th century by wealthy developer Charles Roser.

== History ==
Born in Elryia, Ohio in 1864, Charles Martin Roser foresaw the opportunities that came with purchasing land in Florida during the land boom. He believed that this location would draw the northerners, who lived in very cold climates most of the year, to the warm and sunny climate of what is now Roser Park, FL. It is rumored by some residents that Charles Roser earned fame and fortune by inventing the Fig Newton cookie, selling his recipe and baking process to The National Biscuit Company (Nabisco). Nabisco has stated that they have no record of Charles Roser, and evidence strongly suggests the cookie originated in Newton Massachusetts, for which it is named.

In 1910, Roser and his wife, Ruth, came to St. Petersburg to establish himself as a developer of this land. His first projects in Florida included the Palm and Poinsettia Hotels, Mound Park Hospitals home for nurses, and Mercy Hospital for black residents. In 1911, he broke ground on the Roser Park development, originally purchasing land from C.D. Hammond, J.P. Lynch, and Alex Linn to get started. From there, he expanded the development from 60 to 80 lots, then began purchasing and renovating subdivisions in the surrounding areas.

One of the last things that Charles Roser built before he died in 1937 was the Royal Palm Hotel in 1923, which was located on 5th St S in St. Petersburg.

The historic home located at 682 ROSER PARK DR S, ST PETERSBURG, FL 33701 was named “House Beautiful” by Charles Roser. This home sits on top of the hill with a view of Booker Creek. Owned by Gary M Guthrie for 25 years, he hired Aaron Hunt and Rob Johnson of Avalon Group Real Estate Agents to sell this home which sold on March 29, 2019, to the buyer Christienne M Valone.
