= Enrico Bisio =

Italian field hockey player (1934–2003)

Personal information
- Nationality: Italian
- Born: 24 September 1934 Genoa, Italy
- Died: 9 August 2003 (aged 68)

Sport
- Sport: Field hockey

Enrico Bisio (24 September 1934 – 9 August 2003) was an Italian field hockey player. He competed in the men's tournament at the 1960 Summer Olympics.
