= Anna Maria Island =

Island off the Gulf coast of Florida, United States

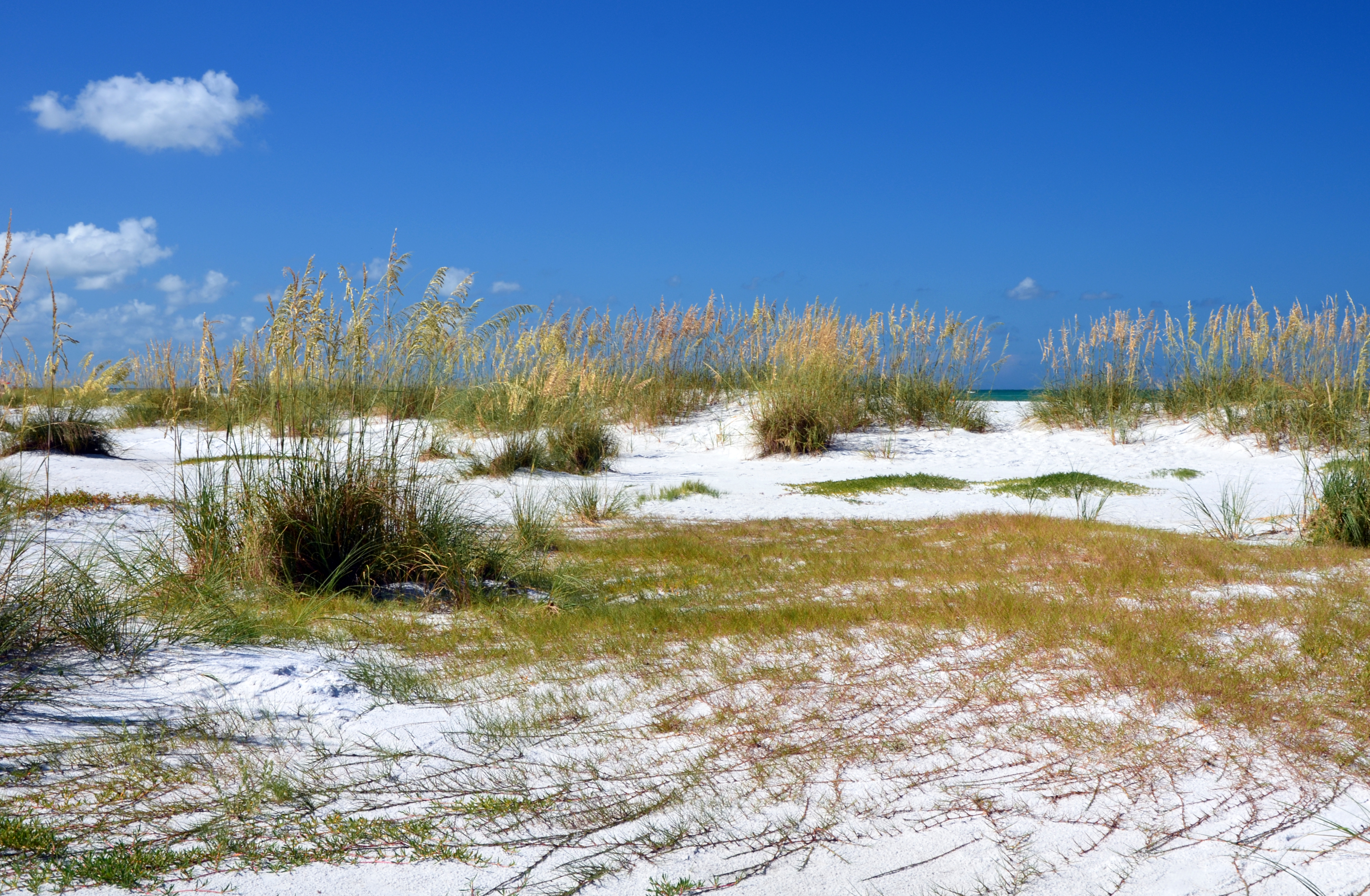
- Dune by the north of Anna Maria Island

- Location in United States of America Anna Maria Island (Florida)

Geography
- Location: Gulf of Mexico
- Coordinates: 27°30′47″N 82°43′08″W

Administration
- United States
- State: Florida
- County: Manatee

Anna Maria Island is a barrier island on the coast of Manatee County, Florida, in the United States. It is bounded on the west by the Gulf of Mexico, on the south by Longboat Pass (which separates it from Longboat Key), on the east by Anna Maria Sound, and on the north by Tampa Bay. Anna Maria Island is approximately 7 miles (11 km) long north to south.

== History ==
Anna Maria Island was part of the Safety Harbor culture area for many centuries before the arrival of Europeans in Florida. Both the Narvaez expedition, in 1527, and the Hernando de Soto expedition, in 1539, entered the mouth of Tampa Bay, north of Anna Maria Island, passing the island to make landfall on the mainland.

Anna Maria Island was first settled in the mid-nineteenth century by Confederate Deputy Marshall and Tampa Mayor Madison Post who then named the island for his wife Maria and his sister-in-law Anna. As Cuban fishermen were the first visitors to the island at the southern mouth of Tampa Bay, the settlement was very soon dominated by nautical types.

In 1892, George Emerson Bean became the first permanent resident on the Island, homesteading much of what is now the city of Anna Maria. After Bean's death in 1898, the land's ownership transferred to his son, George Wilhelm Bean, who partnered with Charles Roser, a wealthy real estate developer from St. Petersburg, to form the Anna Maria Beach Company in order to develop the area. The company laid out streets, built sidewalks and houses, and installed a water system.

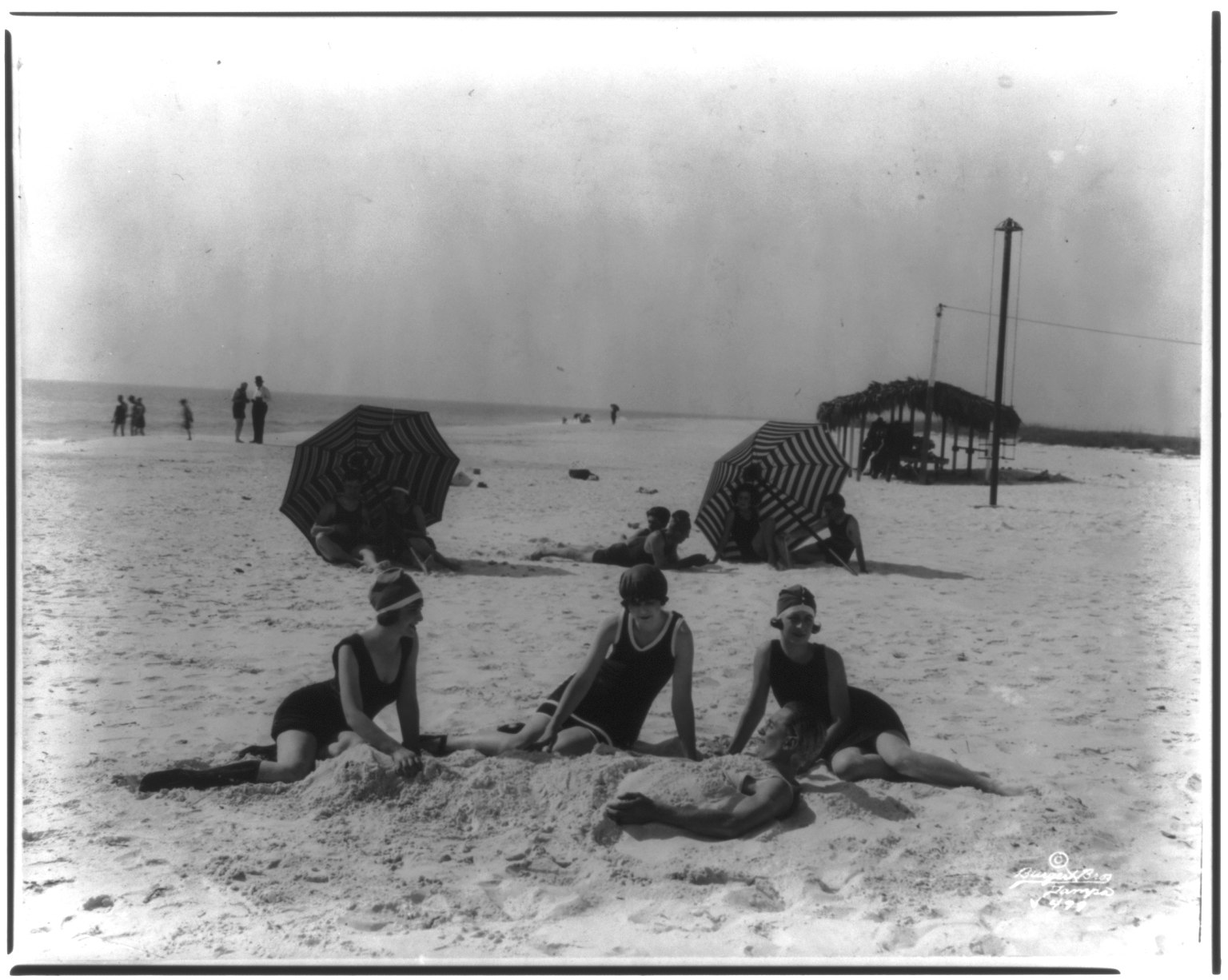
People at the beach on Anna Maria Island in 1923

In 1921, actor Paul Gilmore purchased 40 acres (16 ha) of land where present day Coquina Beach is, with the intent to build a film colony, Paul Gilmore's Oriental Film City, later renamed Gil-Mor Isle. Only one movie, The Isle of Destiny, was filmed there, with Gilmore appearing in the movie which was by Character Picture Corporation. However, the movie was unsuccessful, never getting national distribution. Gilmore was unable to get other movies filmed there, and later the Florida land boom crashed.

The first bridge that was built to connect Anna Maria Island to mainland Florida began construction in the summer of 1921. A heavy storm wiped out half the bridge, but construction was able to continue. The bridge was finished as scheduled in 1922. It crossed the bay to what now is Bridge Street in Bradenton Beach to the fishing town of Cortez. More people then began to visit the island, which caught the interest of several businessmen.

Holmes Beach is a planned community that was started by John E. Holmes Sr. after World War II and was named after him. Holmes Beach was incorporated March 13, 1950. Other potential names that were proposed for Holmes Beach were: Palm City, Mid-Island Beach, Coquina Beach and Tarpon Beach. Bradenton Beach was incorporated the following year on December 21, 1951.

== Name origin ==
Legend states that "a Spanish explorer" named the place "Ana Maria Cay" in honor of the Virgin Mary and her mother, Ann.

A common myth reported that Ponce de León (died 1521) named the island for Maria Anna von der Pfalz-Neuburg (born 1667), the queen of Charles II of Spain (born 1661), the sponsor of his expedition.

In the past, pronunciation of the name differed: old timers said "Anna Mar-EYE-a," but most people today say "Anna Mar-EE-a".

== Geography ==
=== Fauna ===
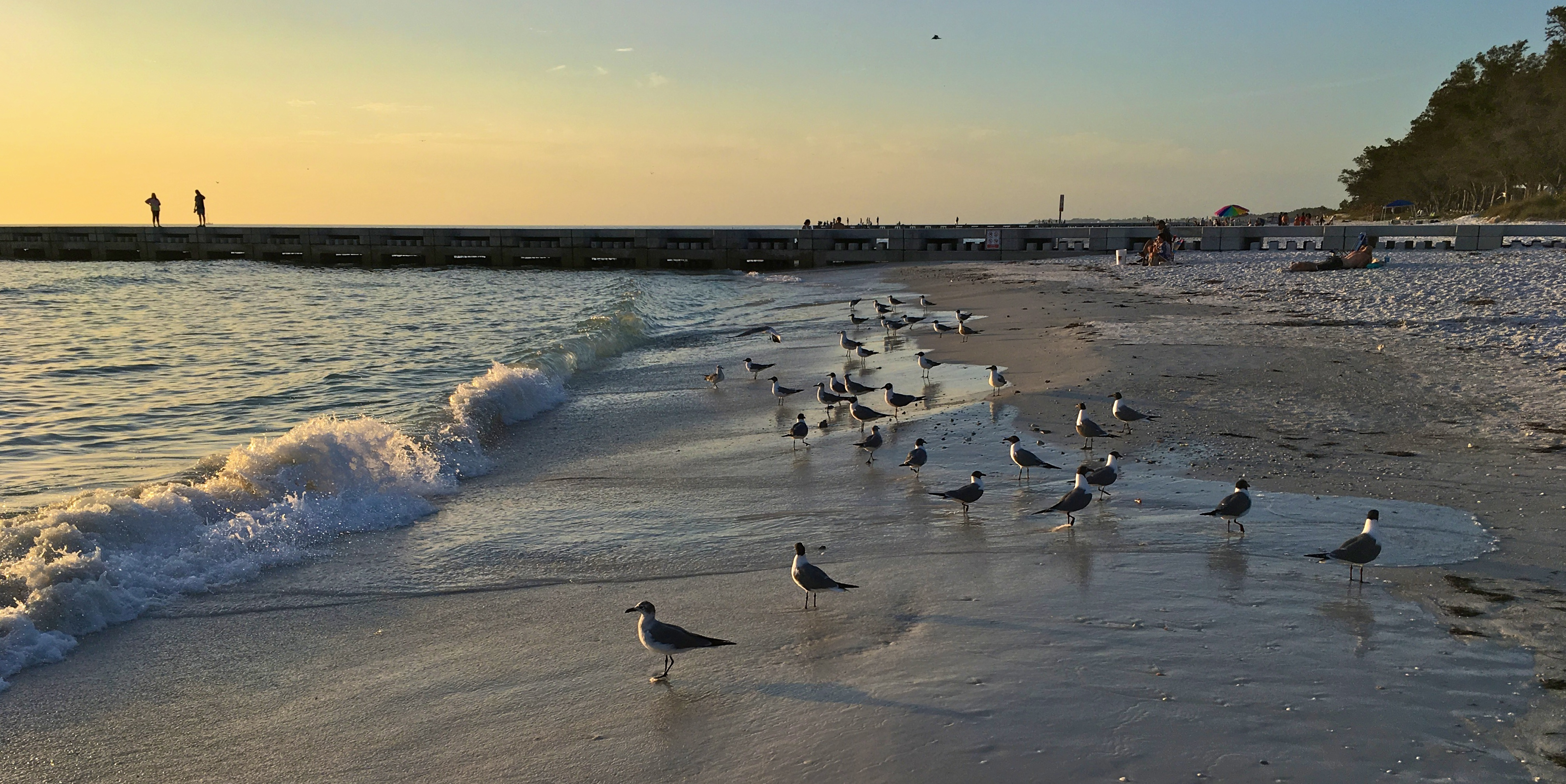
Cortez Beach

From May through October in Florida, sea turtles come ashore to nest.

The island is a bird sanctuary. There are pelicans, multiple types of cranes, herons, feral parrots, sandpipers, osprey, hawks, vultures, seagulls, crows, and a nesting pair of bald eagles. Bottlenose dolphins are in the Intracoastal Waterway, the Gulf, and Bimini Bay.

There are roseate spoonbills, snowy egrets, and wood storks. Marine animals include redfish, snapper, mackerel, black drum, snook, trout, and amberjack.

=== Adjacent islands ===
Adjacent to Anna Maria Island's bayside is the island of Key Royale, formerly known as School Key. It was uninhabited until 1960, when a bridge was built joining it to the Holmes Beach section of Anna Maria Island and development began. It is included in the city limits of Holmes Beach. Longboat Key lies at the very southern edge of the island, connected by the Gulf Drive drawbridge. Just to the east of the drawbridge lies Jewfish Key.

=== Municipalities ===
Anna Maria Island today is divided into the three cities of Anna Maria in the north, Holmes Beach in the middle, and Bradenton Beach in the south. In 2005 the United States Census Bureau estimated the combined population of the three cities at approximately 8,500.

== Demographics ==
As of 2020 the United States Census Bureau reported the population at 1,092. The age range of majority of residents is 55–84 years old.

Historical population (2010–2020)
Census year	Population
2010	1,475
2011	1,514
2012	1,389
2013	1,559
2014	1,223
2015	1,224
2016	1,133
2017	1,016
2018	874
2019	724
2020	1,092

Anna Maria Island demographics (2020)
Racial composition	Population
White (non-Hispanic)	1,034
Black or African-American	2
Hispanic or Latino	12
Asian	3
American Indian and Alaska Native	41

== Climate ==
According to the Köppen climate classification, Anna Maria Island is between a tropical climate with a dry winter and a subtropical climate that's fully humid with a hot summer.

Climate data for Anna Maria Island, Florida
Month	Jan	Feb	Mar	Apr	May	Jun	July	Aug	Sep	Oct	Nov	Dec
Average High	72 °F (22 °C)	74 °F (23 °C)	78 °F (26 °C)	83 °F (28 °C)	88 °F (31 °C)	91 °F (33 °C)	92 °F (33 °C)	92 °F (33 °C)	90 °F (32 °C)	85 °F (29 °C)	79 °F (26 °C)	74 °F (23 °C)
Average Low	50 °F (10 °C)	53 °F (12 °C)	56 °F (13 °C)	61 °F (16 °C)	66 °F (19 °C)	72 °F (22 °C)	73 °F (23 °C)	74 °F (23 °C)	73 °F (23 °C)	66 °F (19 °C)	58 °F (14 °C)	53 °F (12 °C)
Average Precipitation	2.1 in (53 mm)	1.7 in (43 mm)	2.6 in (66 mm)	1.9 in (48 mm)	2.6 in (66 mm)	6.7 in (170 mm)	7.4 in (190 mm)	8.6 in (220 mm)	6.8 in (170 mm)	2.3 in (58 mm)	1.4 in (36 mm)	2.1 in (53 mm)

=== Hurricanes ===
- 2024 – Hurricane Milton – The hurricane first made landfall as a category 3 but eventually became a category 1. In anticipation of an 11 to 15 feet (3.4 to 4.6 m) storm surge, fire, EMS, and police evacuated Anna Maria Island prior to the arrival of Hurricane Milton according to Holmes Beach Police Chief William Tokajer.
- 2024 – Hurricane Helene - Despite the storm being nearly 100 miles (160 km) off shore, the island experienced strong winds, storm surge and severe localized flooding, with Bradenton Beach, the island's southernmost city, seeing the most significant damage. Bradenton Beach, was surveyed by the state's CERT team and it was determined that it was 90%-95% destroyed from the storm. The city was deemed a "catastrophic area." 100% of single family homes on the island saw at least 3–4 feet of floodwaters.
- 2022 – Hurricane Ian – The storm did damage to many nearby parts of Florida, but damage here was minimal.
- 2021 – Hurricane Elsa – There was flooding and storm surge in the area, but no serious damage or injuries.
- 2017 – Hurricane Irma – This caused damage, but not very severe. The city pier, a large attraction in the area, was destroyed and closed for three years to repair. This ended up costing 6.8 million dollars.
- 2016 – Hurricane Hermine – This storm caused severe flooding due to extensive rainfall and in turn, home damage.
- 2004 – Hurricanes Frances and Jeanne – These two hurricanes happened within about a week of each other. The combined effects of these resulted in dune and beach erosion, but no major structural damage.

== Education ==
The only school located in Anna Maria Island is Anna Maria Elementary School and it is in the Manatee school district. This is a public school in Manatee County that offers kindergarten to fifth grade classes. There are 203 students attending as of 2021.

There are no middle schools or high schools on the island, but there are a couple options still in Manatee County. There is Martha B. King Middle School in Bradenton, Florida. There is also Manatee High School in Bradenton, Florida. There are also a few private schools in the area, but again, not on the island.

There are also no higher education options available, but off the island there is State College of Florida - SCF Bradenton. This is also in Manatee County.

== Transportation ==
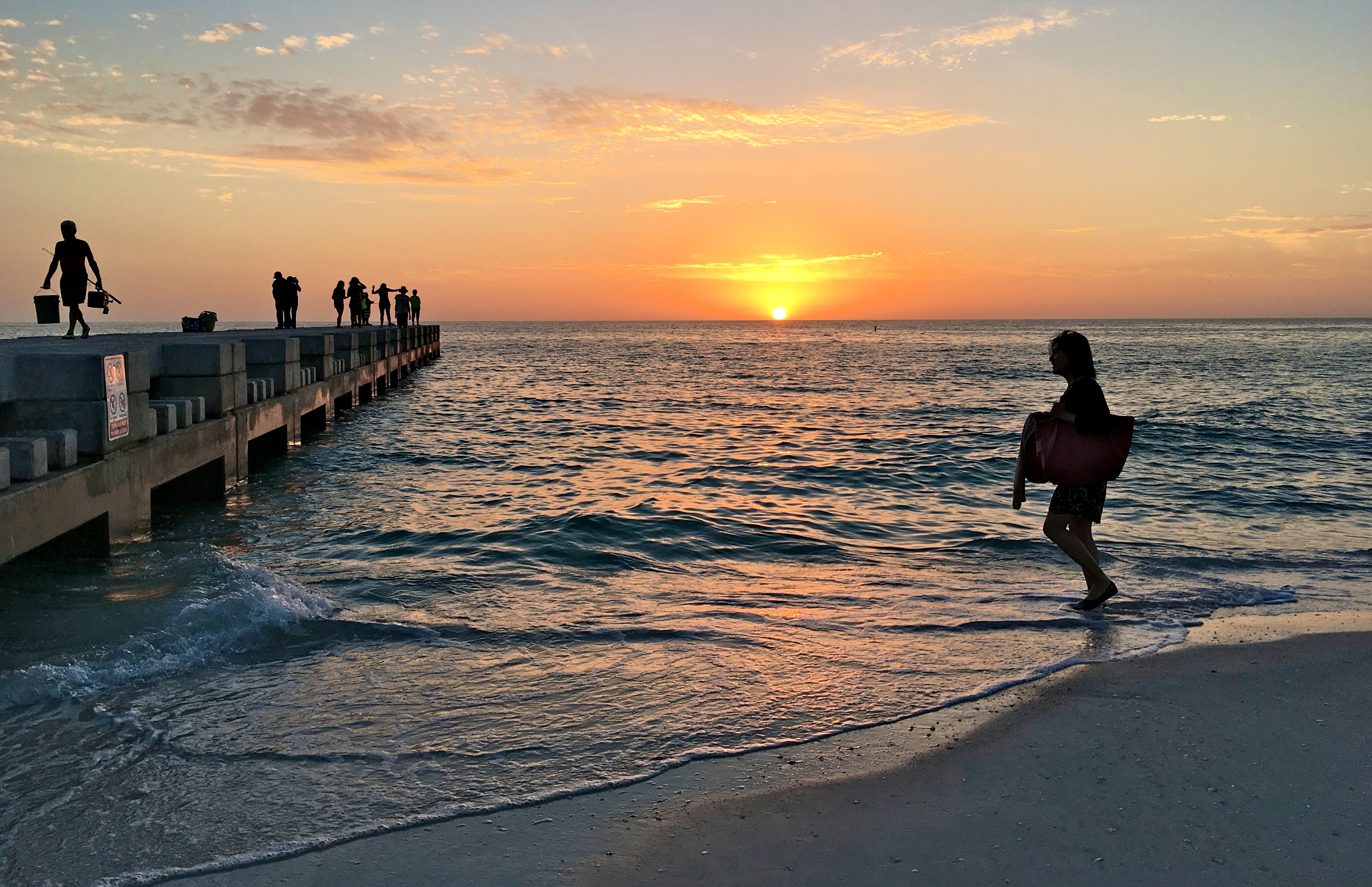
A groin on Cortez Beach at sunset

The main north–south road on the island is Gulf Drive, which begins on the south end of the island at the foot of the Longboat Pass Bridge from Longboat Key. Gulf Drive is the only road that runs the entire length of the island. It is State Road 789 south of Manatee Avenue (State Road 64) in Holmes Beach and Holmes Beach City 789 (a former portion of State Road 64) north of there.

There are two bridges across from the mainland: the Cortez Bridge, which brings State Road 684 into Bradenton Beach from Cortez, and the Anna Maria Island Bridge, which brings State Road 64 into Holmes Beach from the Palma Sola section of Bradenton.

Anna Maria Island is served by a free trolley-style bus that runs north and south on Gulf Drive. The trolley connects with both the MCAT (Manatee County Area Transit) system serving the greater Bradenton area, and the SCAT (Sarasota County Area Transit) system. The MCAT connects to the trolley at Manatee Public Beach, at the intersection of State Road 789 and State Road 64. The SCAT connects to the trolley at Coquina Beach, at the south end of Anna Maria Island, just before the Longboat Key Bridge. Several local taxi companies serve Anna Maria Island.

Anna Maria Island was only accessible by boat until 1921, when the wooden Cortez Bridge was constructed from the fishing village of Cortez to what is now Bridge Street in Bradenton Beach. The remaining parts of the Cortez Bridge are used as a fishing pier.

== Economy ==
=== Tourism ===
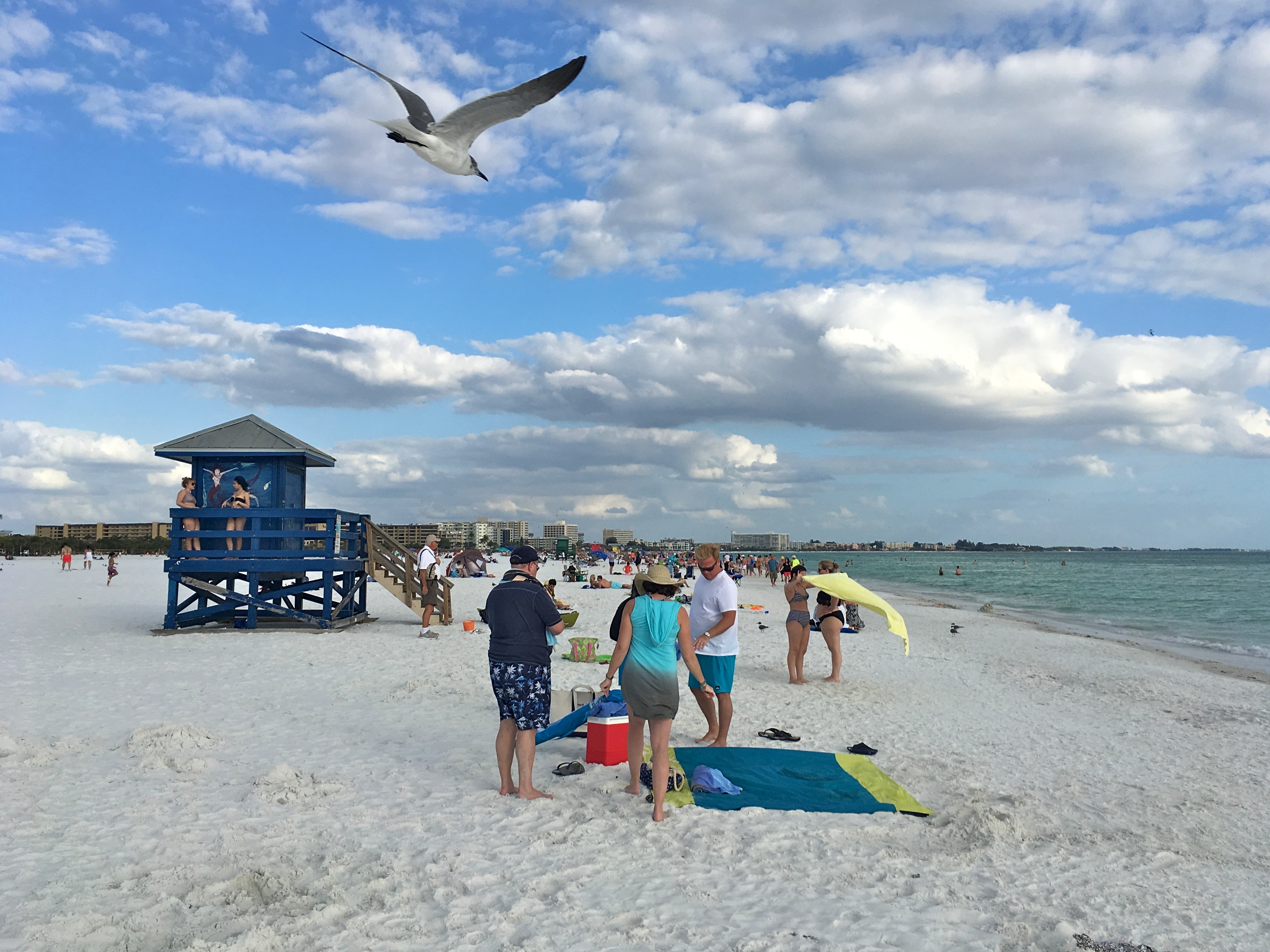
Lifeguard station at Coquina Beach

Since 2002, tourism development has been targeted as a key economic goal by island, county and state officials and millions of tax dollars have been invested to draw visitors to the island with national and international advertising and publicity efforts. This success has not been without its downsides of congested traffic, noise, litter and parking complaints during peak tourist seasons. This influx of visitors has prompted developers to convert many of the original 1950s and 1960s-era houses into short-term rental units, a subject of local controversy.

== In media ==
In 1938 Siam Garden Resort began a fish camp and in 1948, MGM brought Esther Williams, Peter Lawford, Ricardo Montalbán, Jimmy Durante, Cyd Charisse, and Xavier Cugat to Anna Maria Island to film “On an Island with You." In the plot "a beautiful movie star travels to Hawaii and finds romance in this South Seas musical.” Anna Maria Island is featured in the Florida band Shinedown's video for "Second Chance".

Anna Maria Island is the setting for the 2016 comedy/drama, Monty Comes Back, written and directed by Bradenton native Thomas John Nudi.

Longtime resident Kathleen Flinn wrote about her family's abrupt move to the island in the 1970s after her dying father fell in love with the place in her book, Burnt Toast Makes You Sing Good (Penguin Random House).

== Notable people ==
- Tim Berra, biologist
- Rick Bisio, writer and franchise consultant
- Rhea Chiles, First Lady of Florida from 1991 to 1998
- Detox, drag queen
- Wyatt Blassingame, writer
- Kathleen Flinn, writer and journalist
- Fred Hutchinson, former Major League baseball pitcher and manager
- Martin H. Hiller, entrepreneur
- Johnny Lattner, professional football player
- Scott Makar, lawyer and judge
- Nan Mason, painter and photographer
- W. Patrick McGinnis, business executive
- Talbot Mundy, writer
- Andrzej Nowacki, artist
- Chris Perez, former Major League baseball pitcher
- Georges Simenon, writer
- Beulah Rebecca Hooks Hannah Tingley, politician

== Gallery ==
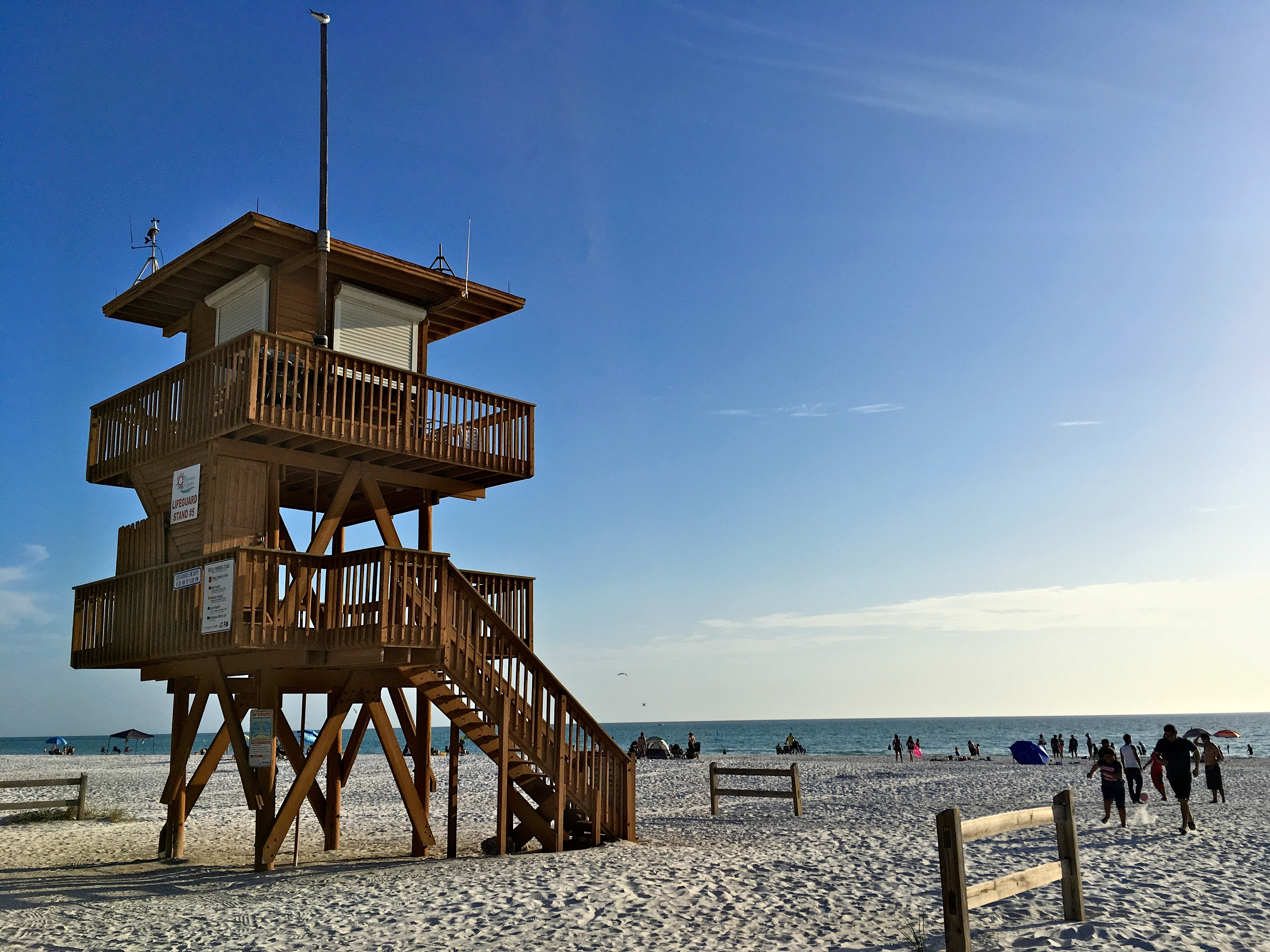
Late afternoon at Coquina Beach

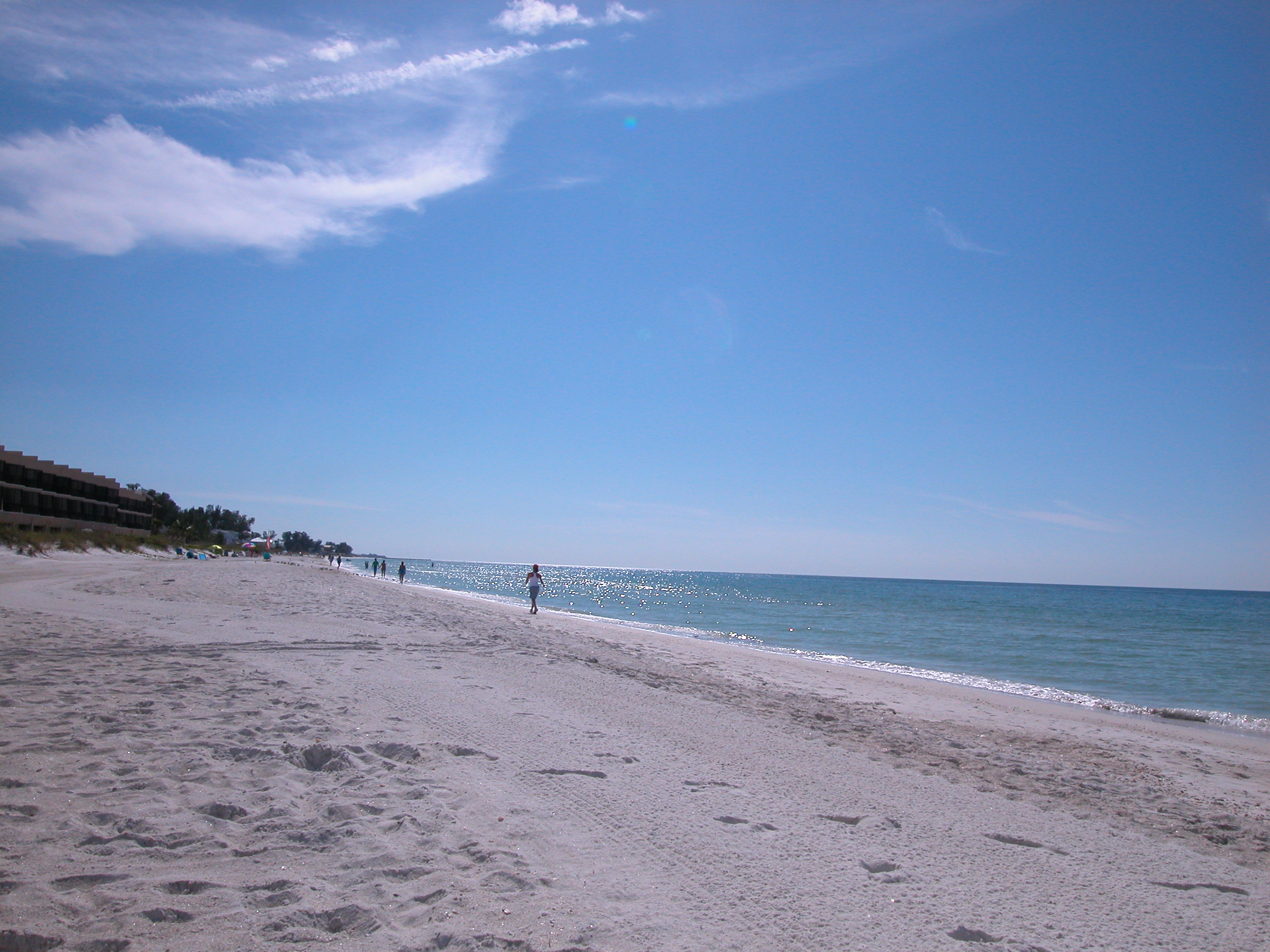
The view from Holmes Beach looking south.

One view from the Pier Restaurant looking toward the shore.

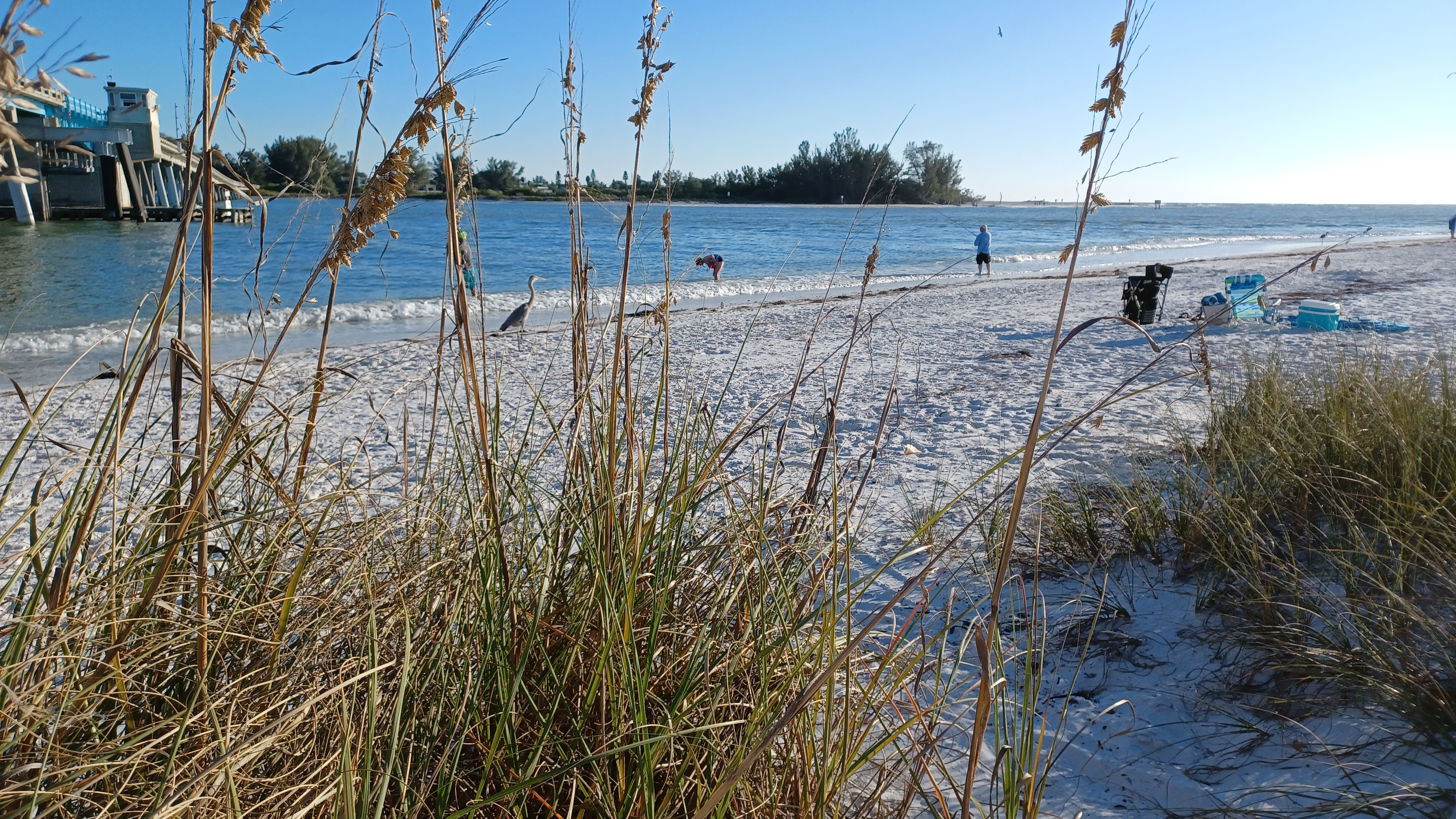
Late afternoon on Coquina Beach (Longboat Pass) looking Southwest
