= Rick Bisio =

American writer and consultant

- Born: 1964 (age 61–62); Kansas City, Missouri
- Education: Washington University in St. Louis (1987, BSBA); Thunderbird School of Global Management (1994, MBA)
- Occupations: Writer and consultant
- Years active: 2002–present
- Notable work: The Educated Franchisee

Rick Bisio (born 1964) is an American writer, educator, and franchise consultant. He has served various roles for the government of Manatee County, Florida and has been a member of the Board of Directors of the Chamber of Commerce of Manatee County since 2007. He was also Chairman of the Planning and Zoning Board for the City of Bradenton Beach, Florida from 2002 until 2012.

== Early life and education ==
Bisio was born in 1964 in Kansas City, Missouri. His father owned a beauty salon at the Country Club Plaza in Kansas City.

He graduated with a BSBA from Washington University in St. Louis in 1987. In 1994, he obtained an MBA from Thunderbird School of Global Management.

== Career ==
In 1994, Bisio became the director of international development at AFC Enterprises, which is the parent company of Popeye's Chicken, Church's Chicken, Seattle's Best Coffee, and Cinnabon. Afterwards, he became an executive at Environmental Biotech. Starting from 2002, Bisio has been a consultant for franchises, and was also Chairman of the Planning and Zoning Board for the City of Bradenton Beach from 2002 until 2012. He was also Chairman of the Charter Review Committee in 2010 and 2015, and was Representative for AMI Urban Land Institute Study in 2015.

Bisio has served as chairman of the board of the Manatee County Chamber of Commerce since 2022, and has been a member of its Board of Directors since 2007.

He has regularly lectured at ICSC, IFA Berlin, and other conventions and regularly held events.

== Publications ==
Bisio is the author of The Educated Franchisee. The first edition was published in 2008, while the third edition was published in 2017. Bisio also created the FDD Exchange, an educational resource of The Educated Franchisee, and has also authored A Glossary of Franchise Terms.

In 2011, Bisio co-authored The Franchisee Playbook with Britt Schroeter. The second edition was published in 2020.

Bisio regularly contributes to Forbes, Entrepreneur, and other magazines.

== Personal life ==
Bisio currently lives on Anna Maria Island in Florida.
