= Monty Comes Back =

- Directed by: Thomas John Nudi
- Written by: Thomas John Nudi
- Produced by: Vincent Dale; Thomas John Nudi; Trishul Thejasvi
- Starring: Brandon Tyler Jones; Deborah Childs; Brad Clark; Stephen Birge; Jessica Cohen; Johnny Hobbs; David E. McMahon; Paul Saulo
- Cinematography: Trishul Thejasvi
- Edited by: Billy Durden
- Music by: Dylan Glatthorn
- Production company: NuFamCo Films
- Release date: April 2, 2016 (United States); (Sarasota Film Festival)
- Running time: 88 minutes
- Country: United States
- Language: English
- Budget: $15,000

Monty Comes Back is a 2016 American drama/comedy film written and directed by Thomas John Nudi and starring Brandon Tyler Jones. The film is set almost entirely in Anna Maria Island, Florida and filmed on location, as well as in Bradenton and Sarasota. It was shot in 16 days during the summer of 2015 on a production budget of only $15,000 collected from a successful Kickstarter campaign, as well as private investors.

== Synopsis ==
Monty (Brandon Tyler Jones) is a semi-successful thespian working in Detroit, Michigan. A former Genius Grant recipient, he has squandered his funds and remains in stasis at a local community theater. After losing his job due to an over-inflated ego, he returns home to Anna Maria Island, Florida to stay with his parents, Ed (Brad Clark) and Marie (Deborah Childs), under the false pretense of being on a "creative hiatus". During his time home, he continues to let his ego destroy his relationships with family and friends while trying to renovate his grandfather's old Chevrolet 210.

== Cast ==
- Brandon Tyler Jones as Monty
- Deborah Childs as Marie
- Brad Clark as Ed
- Stephen Birge as Joel
- Jessica Cohen as Lula
- Johnny Hobbs as Bob the Fisherman
- Paul Saulo as Jim
- David McMahon as Tucker the Trucker

== Background ==
[An unlikeable character] was kind of a point of contention for me in film school. We would go back and forth, and people would tell me, "You can't have a main character that you don't like!" I always thought, "Well, why not?"

— Thomas John Nudi, 2015

Thomas John Nudi initially wrote the screenplay for the film during his time as a film production graduate at Chapman University's Dodge College of Film and Media Arts, while studying under Barry W. Blaustein (Saturday Night Live, Coming to America). Semi-autobiographical in nature, the film is based on his feelings returning to his hometown after reaching moderate levels of academic success.

The script was acquired by NuFamCo Films in May 2014, and pre-production began in fall of that year.

== Production ==
Monty Comes Back is directed by Thomas John Nudi and produced by Nudi, Vincent Dale, and Trishul Thejasvi (who also doubled as the film's cinematographer). Production was funded by donations through Kickstarter and investors from around Florida's Gulf Coast. Nearly the entire cast and crew volunteered for their respective roles, with much of the crew coming from Ringling College of Art and Design and Suncoast Technical College. Other than Brandon Tyler Jones, a resident of New York City at time of production, and Deborah Childs, of Atlanta, Georgia, the cast was made up entirely of Florida actors.

Filmed over the course of sixteen days between May and June 2015, locations, props, and numerous other resources were donated by businesses and the communities of Manatee County and Sarasota County.

== Music ==
=== Soundtrack ===
The soundtrack to the film is made up entirely of songs by independent musicians, the majority of whom are Florida-based, of which Nudi collected over a decade. The rights for use in the film were donated by all the artists featured.

==== Track listing ====
1. "Shhh/Peaceful" - The Craters
2. "The Hell and Back" - Archangel
3. "Chiefin' & Rollin' (BFMO Remix)" - S.B.E.
4. "In the Mood" - The Bob Dewart Group
5. "People Say" - The Hobies
6. "ZZzzz" - The Craters
7. "Cold Light, Cold Air" - The Roseline
8. "Horseshoes and Hand Grenades" - The Prospect
9. "Brighter Light" - The Hobies
10. "All by Myself" - Gainstaville
11. "Keep Running and You'll Never Escape" - Reggie Williams
12. "Let's Chill" - S.B.E.
13. "Soul" - The Smokin' Bones
14. "Leaving the Console" - Colin Pepper
15. "Prolly" - Shelby Baldock

=== Score ===
The film's score is composed by Dylan Glatthorn, and will be released as a digital download in Summer 2016.

== Reception ==
Monty Comes Back is an official selection of the 18th annual Sarasota Film Festival, and premiered April 2, 2016.

=== Awards ===
==== Wins ====
- Sarasota Film Festival
  - Audience Award - Best Florida Feature
