= A Florida Feud =

1909 film directed by Sidney Olcott

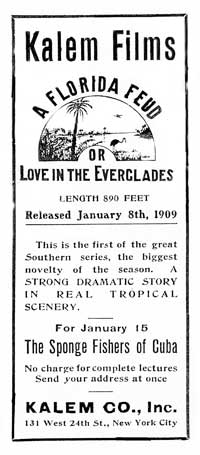
- Directed by: Sidney Olcott
- Produced by: Sidney Olcott
- Production company: Kalem Company
- Distributed by: General Film Company
- Release date: January 8, 1909
- Running time: 975 ft
- Country: United States
- Languages: Silent film (English intertitles)

A Florida Feud is a lost 1909 American silent film produced by Kalem Company and directed by Sidney Olcott, shot in Florida.

== Production notes ==
The film was shot in Jacksonville, Florida. The first of a series shot for Kalem during winter and spring.

Other title : Love in the Everglades

== Bibliography ==
- The Moving Picture World, Vol 4 n° 1, p 11.
- The New York Dramatic Mirror, January 9, 1909, p 9 ; January 16, 1909, p 7.

== See also ==
- The Octoroon (1909 film) "Story of the Turpentine Forest", another film in the series
