= Martin H. Hiller =

Martin (Marty) H. Hiller
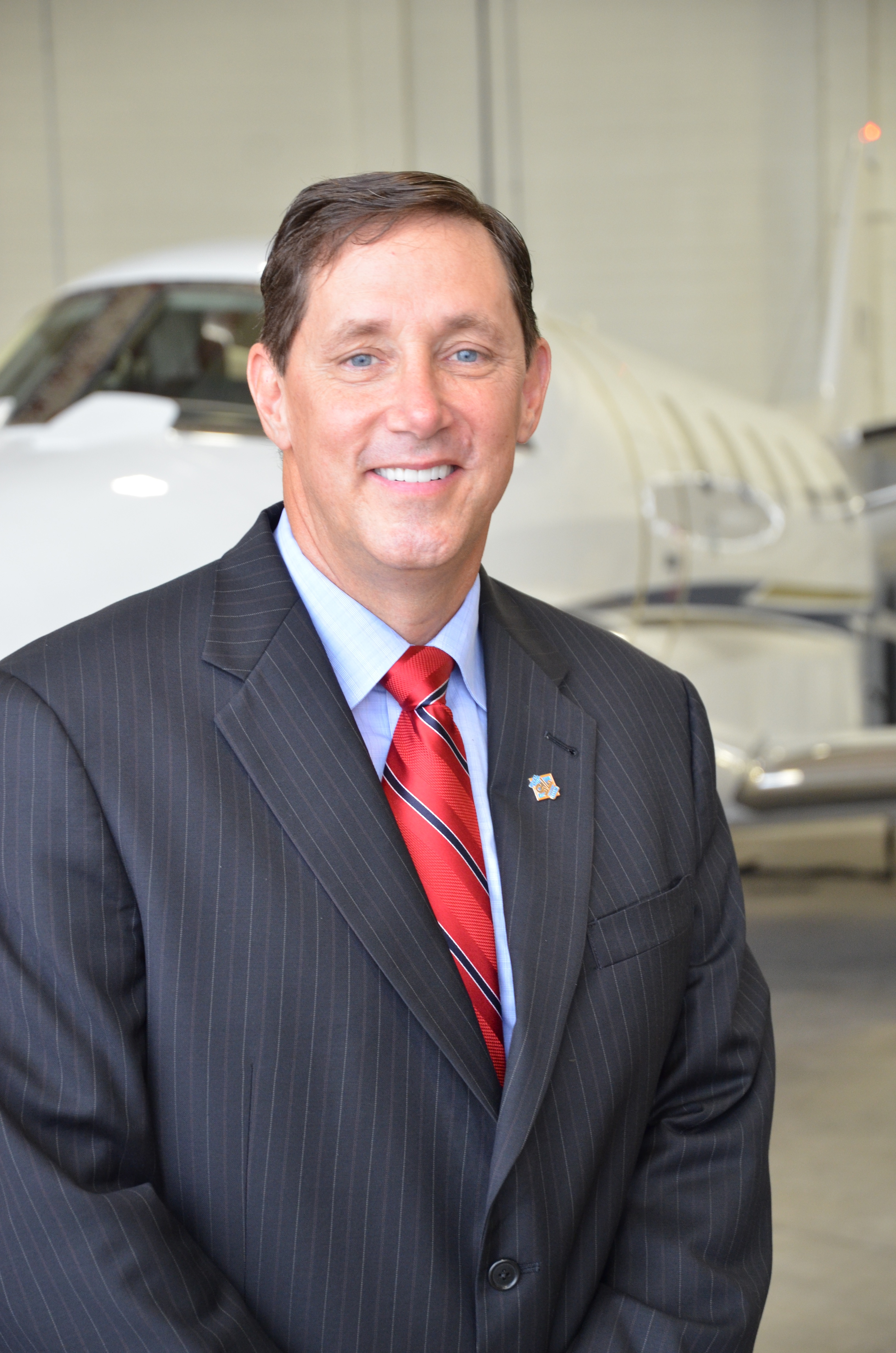
- Born: May 25, 1960 (age 66); Dearborn Heights, Michigan
- Education: Tri-State University
- Occupation: Aviation Entrepreneur
- Spouse: Janice (Blosser) Hiller
- Parent(s): Wes Hiller, Joyce Hiller

Martin (Marty) H. Hiller is an American entrepreneur and a principal in North Shore Holdings, LLC, with interests in aviation, carbon, and minerals.

Hiller is the current Chief Executive Officer of Hiller Carbon, a supplier of carbon to steel mills and foundries. He owns the Marathon Jet Center and Marathon General Aviation in Marathon, Florida.

Hiller previously owned The Hiller Group, a supplier of branded fuel to airports in North America.

== Career ==
=== Hiller Fuels, Inc. ===
In 1982 Hiller joined the family's coal mining company, Hiller Fuels, Inc. which provided bituminous coal to industrial customers. It was sold in 1983, to Nerco Coal Company, a corporation owned by Pacific Corp Holdings.

Hiller managed the coal processing and the joint venture entity Nerco Hiller Coal Company.

=== The Hiller Group, Inc. ===
In 1985, The Hiller Group was founded as a wholesale energy supplier. Hiller started the aviation fuel distribution activities and led the company as vice president. In 1990, he became the president and CEO of the company. In 1995, he purchased the remaining stock of Hiller Group and became the sole shareholder.

The Hiller Group, a major distributor of Chevron branded aviation fuels in the Eastern United States, expanded its US marketing territory through the purchase of Air Petro Corporation, a leading supplier of Chevron branded aviation fuels in the Western United States. The deal was finalized May 1, 2010.

The Hiller Group, Inc. grew to become one of the largest aviation fuel distribution companies in the United States, representing the Chevron, Texaco and Phillips 66 brands. Hiller Group was recognized as one of the top 150 privately held companies and the 100 fastest growing companies in Florida.

=== World Fuel Services ===
In December 2010, Hiller sold the Hiller Group to World Fuel Services. As part of the Hiller Group sale, Hiller joined World Fuel Services; leading the Business Aviation group as Executive Vice President of Business Aviation. He held this position until September 2013, when he returned to lead Hiller Carbon.

=== Hiller Carbon ===
Hiller is currently the CEO of Hiller Carbon, a custom carbon and mineral processing company headquartered in Tampa, Florida. The company supplies carbon and specialty minerals to steel, foundry, rubber, and plastics customers in both domestic and international markets. Hilleris credited with creating the concept Power of P3-Quality People, Quality Processes, Quality Products.

=== National Air Transportation Association ===
Hiller was named President of the National Air Transportation Association (NATA) in August 2016, after six years of service on the NATA Board of Directors. Hiller received the William A. "Bill" Ong Memorial Award from NATA on June 18, 2019.

== Personal life ==
Hiller currently lives in Anna Maria Island, Florida with his wife Janice (née Blosser) Hiller. They have three children together: Wesley, Christie, and Jordan.
