= Andrzej Nowacki =

Polish op art artist

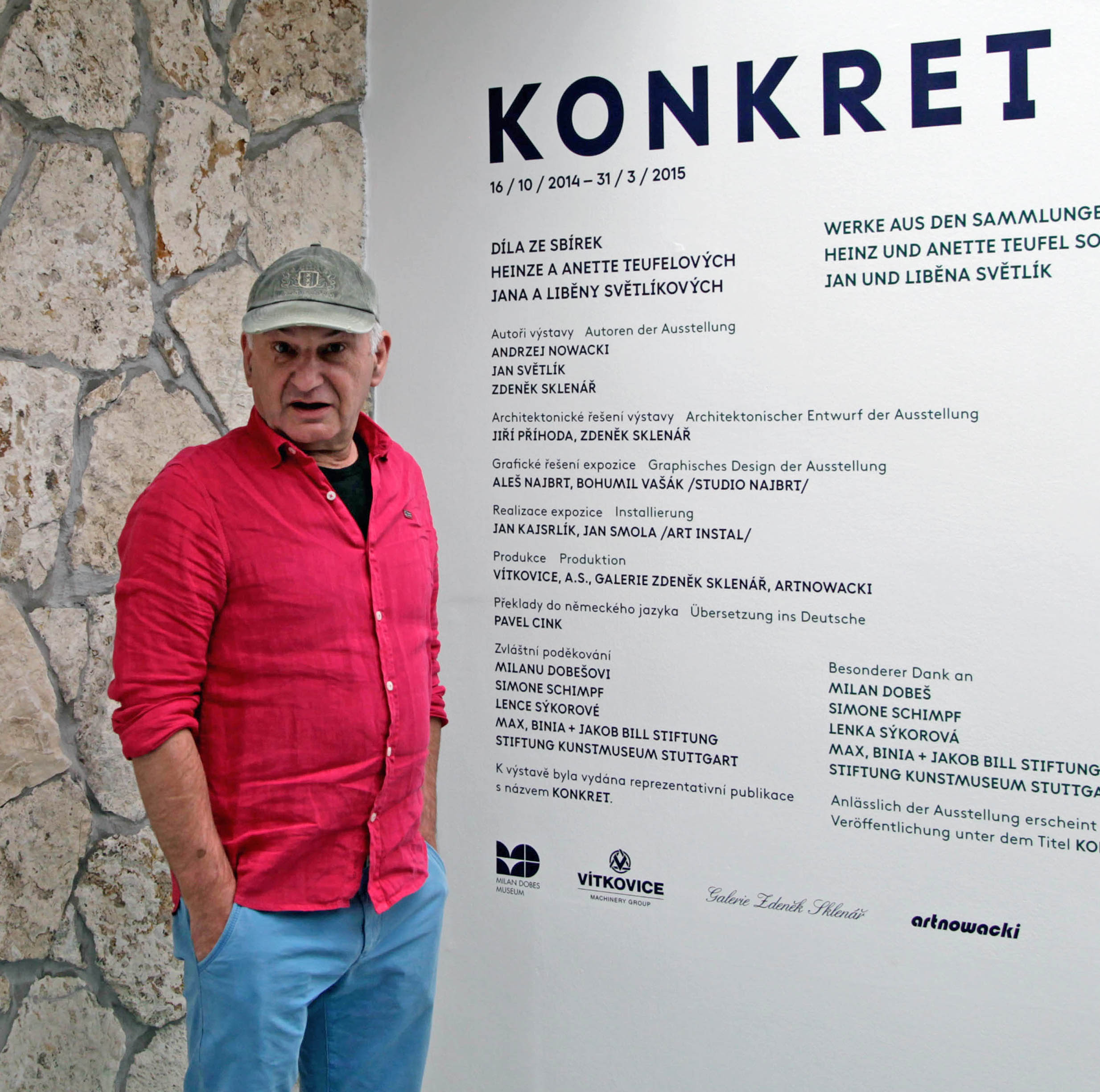
- Nowacki in 2014
- Born: 15 October 1953 (age 72); Rabka-Zdrój, Poland
- Known for: Painting, drawing
- Movement: Geometric abstraction, op art, Concrete art
- Website: nowacki.art/en/index_en.php

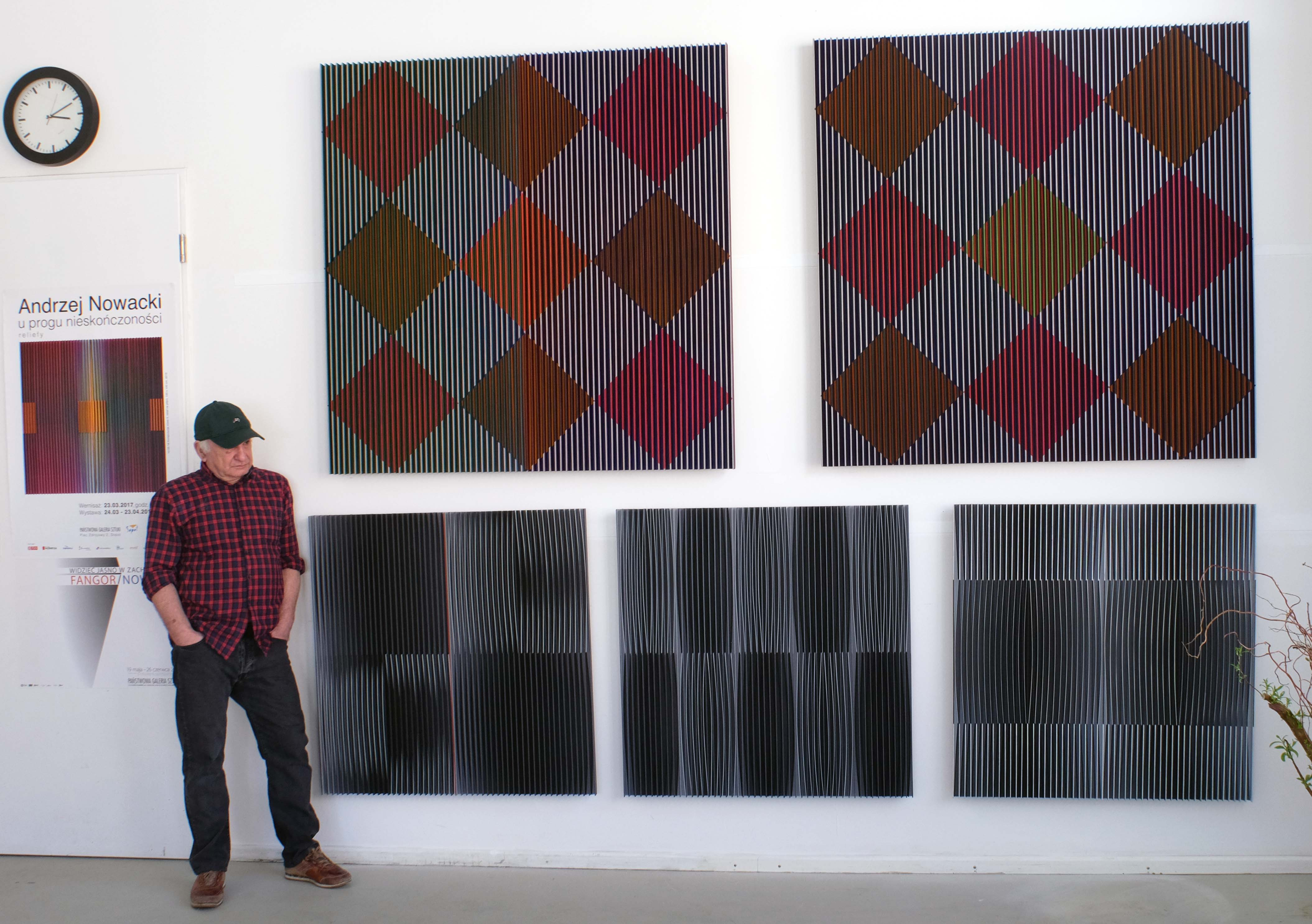
Andrzej Nowacki Atelier Berlin 2018

Andrzej Nowacki (born 15 October 1953) is a Polish op art artist who lives and works in Berlin.

== Early life ==
Andrzej Nowacki was born on 15 October 1953 in Rabka-Zdrój, Poland. He spent his youth in Kraków. His first artistic experience was in interior design and art restoration. In 1977 he left Poland to study Scandinavian languages at the University of Gothenburg and later Art History in Innsbruck, Austria.

== Career ==
During the 1980s Nowacki discovered to himself Polish constructivism. Henryk Stazewski's art had an influence on the early works of Nowacki. Since the 1990s Nowacki had collaborated with Heinz Teufel, a collector who owned one of the most prestigious art galleries for concrete art in Europe, located in Cologne and later in Berlin.

- 1994 Andrzej received a private scholarship in West Orange, New Jersey
- 1997, 1998, 2000 and 2001 he participated in the workshops "Under the Sign of Geometry" organized by Polish art critic Bozena Kowalska in Okuninka, Poland
- 2001 he received a scholarship from the New York Pollock-Krasner Foundation
- 2005 was his first exhibition in Osaka, Japan. Later, he spent a year in his studio at Anna Maria Island, Florida, USA, where he created reliefs for the Seth Jason Beitler Gallery in Miami
- 2015 Nowacki moved to a new large-scale studio at the former industrial area in Ostrava Lower Vítkovice, Czech Republic. Here he started to create his multi-part and large-format reliefs.

Currently, Andrzej Nowacki lives and creates in Berlin, Germany.

== Important exhibitions ==
- 1994 Lederman Fine Art Gallery, New York, USA
- 1997 Exhibition in Galerie "Avantgarde", Berlin, Germany
- 2000 Galerie Heinz Teufel, Berlin, Germany
- 2005 KISSHO Fine Art Gallery, Osaka, Japany
- 2006 Seth Jason Beitler Gallery, Miami, USA
- 2008 Milan Dobeš Múzeum, Bratislava, Slovakia
- 2009 National museum Szczecin, Poland
- 2011 Concrete art (Sztuka konkretna), National Gallery of Art, Sopot, Poland
- 2017 Konkrete Anliegen. Sammlung Teufel, Kunstmuseum Stuttgart, Germany
- 2017 "The magic of square", National Gallery of Art, Sopot, Poland
- 2019 Milan Dobeš Museum: "Mystery of a quarter"
- 2019 "Variation on black": AP atelier Prague.

And more than 50 other individual and group exhibition around the World.

== Style and medium ==
- Op art, abstract art, concrete art, geometric abstraction
- Unique optical technique performed manually on masonite board with acrylic colors. Works bring the feeling of 3D perception. Viewer is the part of the work. Colours and shapes change depending on viewer's position and create the feeling of moment.

Since 1988, the sculptural form of the relief remains the exclusive medium of Nowacki's works. Since 1995, colour has assumed the leading role as a means of expression.

From 1998, Nowacki's works are inspired by such artists as Max Bill, Josef Albers, Antonio Calderara and Bridget Riley. Impacted by Malevich and Ilya Chashnik, the square remains the obligatory form for the surface of his reliefs.
