= National Register of Historic Places listings in Manatee County, Florida =

Location of Manatee County in Florida

This is a list of the National Register of Historic Places listings in Manatee County, Florida.

This is intended to be a complete list of the properties and districts on the National Register of Historic Places in Manatee County, Florida, United States. The locations of National Register properties and districts for which the latitude and longitude coordinates are included below, may be seen in a map.

There are 33 properties and districts listed on the National Register in the county.

This National Park Service list is complete through NPS recent listings posted May 23, 2025.

Contents: Counties in Florida (non-linked contain no National Register listings)
Alachua - Baker - Bay - Bradford - Brevard - Broward - Calhoun - Charlotte - Citrus - Clay - Collier - Columbia - DeSoto - Dixie - Duval - Escambia - Flagler - Franklin - Gadsden - Gilchrist - Glades - Gulf - Hamilton - Hardee - Hendry - Hernando - Highlands - Hillsborough (Tampa) - Holmes - Indian River - Jackson - Jefferson - Lafayette - Lake - Lee - Leon - Levy - Liberty - Madison - Manatee - Marion - Martin - Miami-Dade (Miami) - Monroe - Nassau - Okaloosa - Okeechobee - Orange - Osceola - Palm Beach - Pasco - Pinellas - Polk - Putnam - St. Johns - St. Lucie - Santa Rosa - Sarasota - Seminole - Sumter - Suwannee - Taylor - Union - Volusia - Wakulla - Walton - Washington

== Current listings ==
KEY

^{W}	covered in the "Whitfield Estates Subdivision MPS"
	NRHP-listed
^{∞}	NRHP-listed Historic district

	Name on the Register	Image	Date listed	Location	City or town	Description
1	Austin House^{W}	Austin House	February 5, 1998 (#98000062)	227 Delmar Ave. 27°24′16″N 82°34′13″W	Whitfield	Externally typical house (built circa 1926) of the Florida land boom given a lavish interior overhaul and a guest house in 1947.
2	John M. Beasley House^{W}	John M. Beasley House	September 23, 1996 (#96000358)	7706 Westmoreland Dr. 27°24′13″N 82°34′17″W	Whitfield	Early Whitfield Estates house built in 1926, and the only home in the subdivision owned by one of the development corporation's officers—John M. Beasley (d. 1938).
3	Judah P. Benjamin Memorial	Judah P. Benjamin Memorial	August 12, 1970 (#70000189)	3708 U.S. Route 301; 27°31′23″N 82°31′35″W	Ellenton	Florida's only antebellum property restored as a Confederate shrine: a plantation house and grounds built 1844–57, managed (and altered) 1925–49 by the United Daughters of the Confederacy. Also known as Gamble Plantation Historic State Park.
4	Braden Castle Park Historic District	Braden Castle Park Historic District	May 9, 1983 (#83001428)	Roughly bounded by the Manatee and Braden Rivers, Ponce DeLeon St., and Pelot Ave. 27°29′57″N 82°31′45″W	Bradenton	Members-only community of seasonal cottages and campsites established in 1924 around the ruins of an 1850 plantation house, encapsulating two key periods of regional settlement.
5	Bradenton Carnegie Library	Bradenton Carnegie Library	April 9, 1987 (#87000616)	1405 4th Ave. W. 27°29′47″N 82°34′32″W	Bradenton	One of 10 Carnegie libraries constructed in Florida; built in 1918 using restrained Neoclassical architecture.
6	Bradenton Woman's Club	Bradenton Woman's Club	February 4, 2019 (#100003409)	1705 Manatee Ave. W. 27°29′43″N 82°34′43″W	Bradenton	1921 women's clubhouse, significant as a cultural and civic venue and for its atypical Colonial Revival design by Fred W. Kermode.
7	Cortez Historic District	Cortez Historic District	March 16, 1995 (#95000250)	Bounded by Cortez Rd., 119th St. W., Sarasota Bay, and 124th St. Ct. W. 27°28′03″N 82°41′02″W	Cortez	Well-preserved fishing village with 97 contributing properties built 1889–1944, reflecting the settlement of Manatee County, the Gulf Coast fishing industry, and vernacular architecture.
8	Curry Houses Historic District	Curry Houses Historic District	September 8, 2015 (#15000571)	4th Ave. E. between 12th & 14th Sts. E. 27°29′47″N 82°32′59″W	Bradenton	Circa-1860 houses of shipbuilder John Curry (1811–1882) and Confederate soldier Samuel G. Curry (1843–1925) and the 1925 bungalow of a descendent, exemplifying Manatee County's pioneer estates and their generational division into urban lots.
9	De Soto National Memorial	De Soto National Memorial	October 15, 1966 (#66000078)	8300 De Soto Memorial Hwy. 27°31′25″N 82°38′36″W	Bradenton vicinity	Site commemorating the 1539 landing of Hernando de Soto (c. 1497–1542) and the first major European expedition deep into what became the southeastern United States. Operated by the National Park Service.
10	Duette School	Duette School	July 30, 2018 (#100002726)	40755 State Rd. 62; 27°35′21″N 82°07′24″W	Duette	1930 school and grounds providing the only public primary education for three rural communities for decades, and a key venue for community events.
11	Johnson Helm House	Johnson Helm House	September 2, 2009 (#09000671)	2104 53rd Ave. E. (SR 70); 27°26′50″N 82°32′17″W	Oneco	Romanesque Revival house and shed constructed of rusticated concrete blocks circa 1907 by local homebuilder Joseph S. Maus (c. 1852–1913).
12	Rufus P. Jordan House	Rufus P. Jordan House	August 12, 2005 (#05000844)	760 Broadway St. 27°26′18″N 82°40′53″W	Longboat Key	Circa-1920 house of Rufus Jordan (1855–1924), who established the first planned settlement on Longboat Key.
13	Kreissle Forge	Kreissle Forge	December 2, 1996 (#96001370)	7947 Tamiami Trail; 27°24′00″N 82°33′51″W	Sarasota	Hand-powered smithy established in 1947 and expanded 1948–1954; one of the nation's few producers of custom, handmade ornamental iron.
14	Madira Bickel Mounds	Madira Bickel Mounds	August 12, 1970 (#70000190)	955 Bayshore Dr. 27°33′55″N 82°35′34″W	Terra Ceia	Native American ceremonial mound revealing three periods of occupation beginning 2,000 years ago. Now a state archaeological site.
15	Manatee County Courthouse	Manatee County Courthouse	June 11, 1998 (#98000676)	1115 Manatee Ave. W. 27°29′40″N 82°34′23″W	Bradenton	County courthouse established in 1913—longstanding venue for civic events and the political, judicial, and economic administration of Manatee County.
16	Manatee County Courthouse (Original)	Manatee County Courthouse (Original)	June 29, 1976 (#76000601)	1404 Manatee Ave. E. 27°29′39″N 82°32′51″W	Bradenton	Florida's oldest surviving purpose-built county courthouse, in use 1860–1866. Preserved at Manatee Village Historical Park.
17	Midway Subdivision Historic District	Midway Subdivision Historic District	May 29, 1998 (#98000587)	7201 15th St. E. 27°24′33″N 82°32′45″W	Sarasota	Three bungalows and a garage all built circa 1926, typifying the semi-rural subdivisions planned around central Florida's cities during the land boom of the 1920s.
18	Palmetto Armory	Palmetto Armory	October 17, 2012 (#12000865)	810 6th St. W. 27°31′00″N 82°34′27″W	Palmetto	1937 armory serving as an important venue for the Florida National Guard, local events, and World War II home front efforts. Also significant as Palmetto's only remaining Works Progress Administration building.
19	Palmetto Historic District	Palmetto Historic District	November 6, 1986 (#86003166)	Roughly bounded by 21st Ave., 7th St., 5th Ave., and the Manatee River; 27°30′55″N 82°34′47″W	Palmetto	Expansive residential, commercial, and industrial areas illustrating Palmetto's development as a modest agricultural service center 1890–1930, with 208 contributing properties of mostly vernacular design.
20	Portavant Mound Site	Portavant Mound Site	December 23, 1994 (#94001475)	5801 17th St. W. 27°31′52″N 82°37′36″W	Palmetto	The largest Native American temple mound in Southwest Florida, built 1,200 years ago by the Safety Harbor culture. Interpreted within the Emerson Point Preserve.
21	Egbert Reasoner House	Egbert Reasoner House	May 4, 1995 (#95000555)	3004 53rd Ave. E. 27°26′48″N 82°31′34″W	Oneco	1896 Shingle Style house and outbuilding designed by Parke T. Burrows for a member of a pioneering horticulturalist family vital to the state's agricultural sector. Demolished in 2015.
22	Regina Shipwreck Site	Regina Shipwreck Site	December 6, 2005 (#05001355)	Offshore of Bradenton Beach; 27°28′08″N 82°42′08″W	Bradenton Beach	1904 steel molasses tanker converted to a barge and wrecked in 1940. One of the few examples remaining in Florida waters of its formerly common steam vessels.
23	Reid-Woods House^{W}	Reid-Woods House	August 31, 2000 (#00001033)	373 Whitfield Ave. 27°24′45″N 82°34′06″W	Whitfield	Circa-1926 Mediterranean Revival house emblematic of the prevailing architectural trends of the 1920s Florida land boom.
24	Richardson House	Richardson House	January 8, 2003 (#02001676)	1603 1st Ave. W. 27°29′55″N 82°34′40″W	Bradenton	Well-preserved 1924 American Craftsman bungalow and garage, one of Bradenton's leading examples of the style.
25	Seagate	Seagate	January 21, 1983 (#83001429)	8374 N. Tamiami Trail; 27°23′27″N 82°33′59″W	Sarasota	Architecturally refined 1929 vacation estate designed by George Albree Freeman Jr. in Mediterranean Revival style for Cincinnati industrialist Powel Crosley Jr. Now an event center.
26	Shaw's Point Archeological District	Shaw's Point Archeological District	April 6, 2001 (#01000342)	8250 Desoto Memorial Hwy. 27°31′20″N 82°38′34″W	Bradenton	Site of a large Native American coastal village inhabited 356 BCE to 110 CE. Preserved within De Soto National Memorial and the Riverview Pointe Preserve.
27	Paul M. Souder House^{W}	Paul M. Souder House	November 2, 2000 (#00001282)	242 Greenwood Ave. 27°24′18″N 82°34′11″W	Whitfield	Part of the Whitfield Estates Subdivision MPS
28	Stevens-Gilchrist House^{W}	Stevens-Gilchrist House	August 17, 2001 (#01000887)	235 Delmar Ave. 27°24′16″N 82°34′12″W	Whitfield	1926 house and garage emblematic of the early residences constructed in the Whitfield Estates subdivision and the work of prolific local builder Thomas A. Monk.
29	Terra Ceia Village Improvement Association Hall	Terra Ceia Village Improvement Association Hall	September 16, 2003 (#03000942)	1505 Center Rd. 27°34′22″N 82°34′52″W	Terra Ceia	One of Florida's oldest women's club meeting halls—an important venue for local community events since its construction in 1906.
30	Villa Serena Apartments^{W}	Villa Serena Apartments	September 29, 2000 (#00001172)	7014 Willow St. 27°24′56″N 82°34′06″W	Whitfield	1926 Mediterranean Revival apartment hotel designed by Clarence C. Hosmer. Whitfield Estates' only multi-unit dwelling, intended to attract prospective homebuyers.
31	Whitfield Estates-Broughton Street Historic District^{W}	Whitfield Estates-Broughton Street Historic District	October 29, 1993 (#93001159)	7207, 7211, 7215, 7219, and 7316 Broughton St. 27°24′42″N 82°34′36″W	Whitfield	The most intact concentration of early residences in the Whitfield Estates Subdivision, comprising five Mediterranean Revival houses and three garages built 1925–1929, including four early works by architect Ralph Twitchell.
32	Whitfield Estates-Lantana Avenue Historic District^{W}	Whitfield Estates-Lantana Avenue Historic District	March 8, 1997 (#97000209)	332–356 Lantana Ave. 27°24′49″N 82°34′09″W	Whitfield	Row of four intact houses and two garages built 1925–1926, illustrating the residential streetscape of middle-class subdivisions that sprang up during the Florida land boom of the 1920s.
33	Woman's Club of Palmetto	Woman's Club of Palmetto	March 6, 1986 (#86000380)	910 6th St. W. 27°31′00″N 82°34′29″W	Palmetto	Mediterranean Revival clubhouse, a key civic venue for Palmetto built in 1930 for an influential women's club established in 1900. Also a contributing property to the Palmetto Historic District.

== See also ==
- List of National Historic Landmarks in Florida
- National Register of Historic Places listings in Florida
