= Midway Historic District =

Midway Historic District may refer to:

in the United States

(by state then city)

- Midway Subdivision Historic District, listed on the National Register of Historic Places (NRHP) in Manatee County
- Midway Historic District (Midway, Georgia), listed on the NRHP in Liberty County
- Midway Historic District (Midway, Kentucky), listed on the NRHP in Woodford County
