= De Soto National Memorial =

- U.S. National Register of Historic Places
- U.S. National Memorial
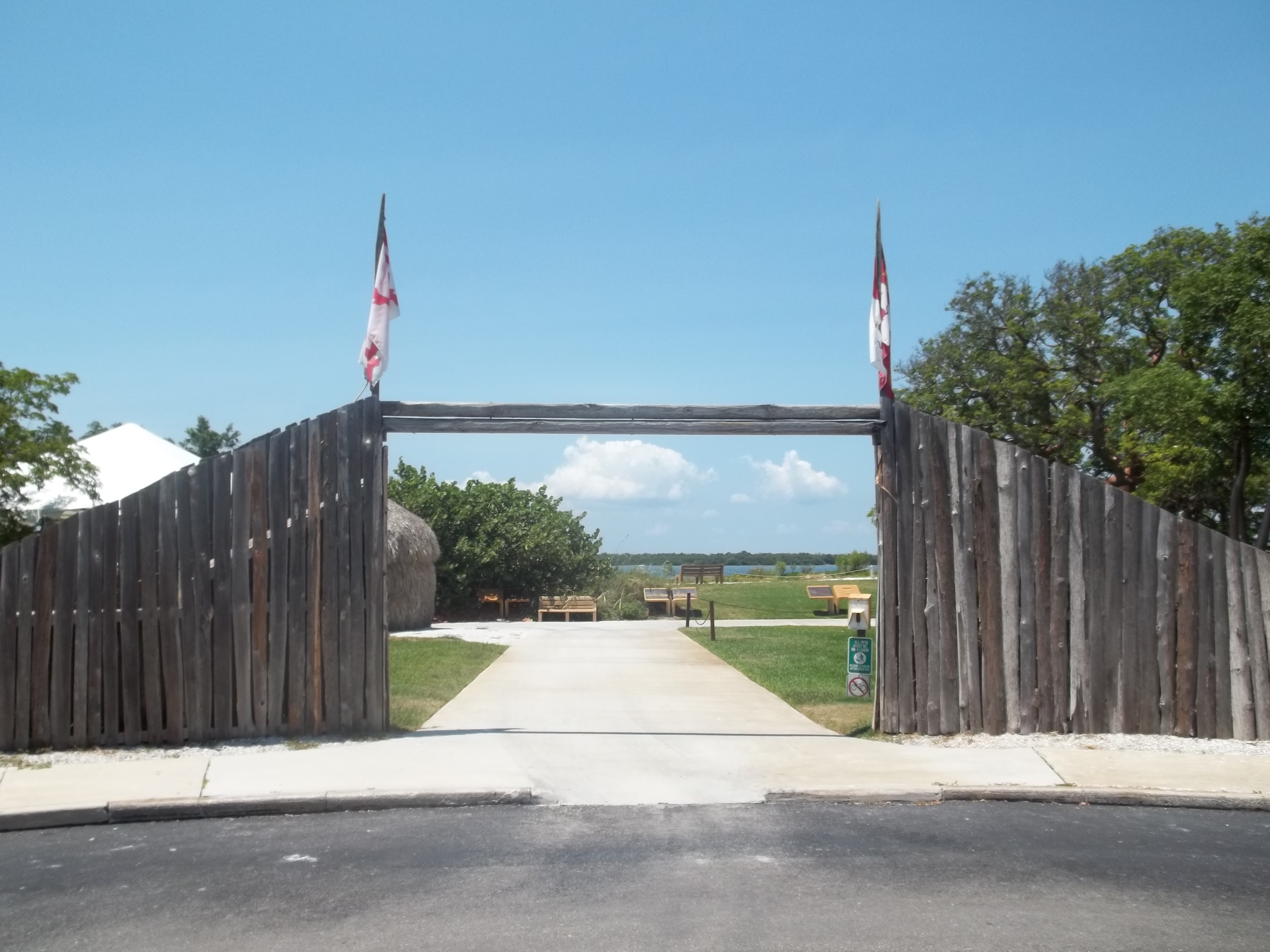

- Location within Florida Location within the United States
- Location: Manatee County, Florida, United States
- Nearest city: Bradenton
- Coordinates: 27°31′26″N 82°38′40″W
- Area: 26.84 acres (10.86 ha)
- Built: 1539
- Visitation: 124,294 (2025)
- Website: Official website
- NRHP reference No.: 66000078

Significant dates
- Added to NRHP: October 15, 1966
- Designated NMEM: March 11, 1948

De Soto National Memorial is a national memorial located in Manatee County, approximately five miles (eight kilometers) west of Bradenton, Florida. The national memorial commemorates the 1539 landing of Hernando de Soto and the first extensive organized exploration by Europeans of what is now the southern United States. The memorial site comprises 26.84 acres (10.86 ha), where the Manatee River joins Tampa Bay. It has 3,000 feet (910 m) of coastline; eighty percent of the area is mangrove swamp.

== De Soto expedition ==
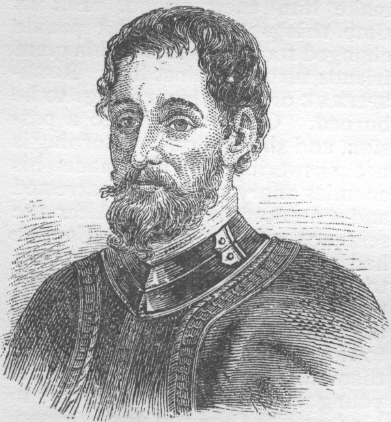
Hernando de Soto

In May 1539, Hernando de Soto and an army of over 600 soldiers landed in the Tampa Bay area. They arrived in nine ships laden with supplies: two hundred and twenty horses, a herd of pigs, war dogs, cannon, matchlock muskets, armor, tools, and rations. They were executing the order of King Charles V to sail to La Florida and "conquer, populate, and pacify" the land.

The expedition did not yield the gold and treasure these men sought. Instead, they marched from one village to the next, taking food and enslaving the native peoples to use as guides and porters. Hundreds of people died on this calamitous four-year, 4,000-mile (6,400 km) journey. The de Soto expedition changed the face of the American Southeast and caused Spain to reevaluate their role in the New World. It was the first-hand accounts of survivors, describing the native cultures and the richness of the land, which became the journey's enduring legacy.

The inventory form of the national park was completed in 1976, as a requirement for its listing in the National Register of Historic Places in 1966. The inventory form notes there is no agreement among historians the memorial was the actual landfall of the De Soto expedition. It is generally accepted that its location, situated at the mouth of the Manatee River, would have been a convenient landing place. De Soto made no reference to the landing point but went on to describe the immediate wooded area as swampy and thick with vast and lofty forests.

== Historic recognition ==
The national memorial was authorized by Congress on March 11, 1948, codified as Pub. L. 80–441 and 62 Stat. 78. When the National Historic Preservation Act was signed into law on October 15, 1966, the memorial was included on the National Register of Historic Places with the name Shaw's Point Archeological District.

The mission of the De Soto National Memorial is to preserve the controversial story of this exploration and interpret its significance in American history. Visitors can attend living history demonstrations, try on a piece of armor, or walk the nature trail through a Florida coastal landscape similar to the one encountered by conquistadors almost five hundred years ago.

== Activities ==
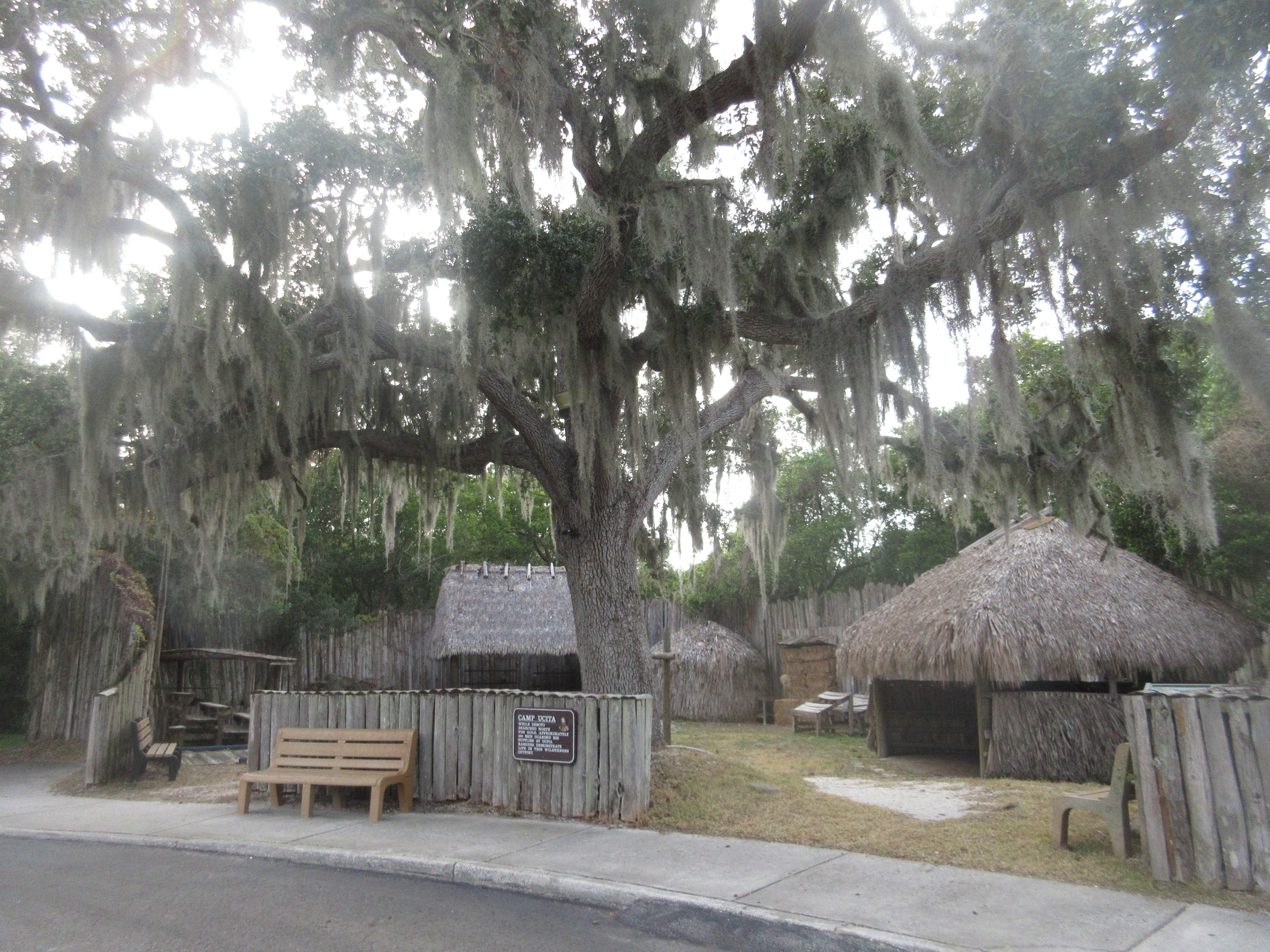
Reconstructed Camp Ucita

Exhibits at the visitor center include historic armor, 16th-century weapons, and period artifacts. A theater displays the movie Hernando de Soto in America, about the DeSoto Expedition and the area's Native American population. A bookstore is also available.

During the cooler months, visitors can observe Camp Uzita, a living history camp which runs from December through April. The season ends with a re-enactment of DeSoto's landing on the beaches of Tampa Bay.

Other park activities include nature trails and guided trail walks, fishing, bird watching, and picnicking. Park admission is free.

== See also ==
- List of national memorials of the United States
- De Soto National Forest, in southern Mississippi
- Narváez expedition, the predecessor to De Soto's, having also begun near Tampa Bay on La Florida's west coast
- National Register of Historic Places listings in Manatee County, Florida
