= Duette School =

Historic school in Florida, United States

Coordinates: 27.5891°N 82.1235°W

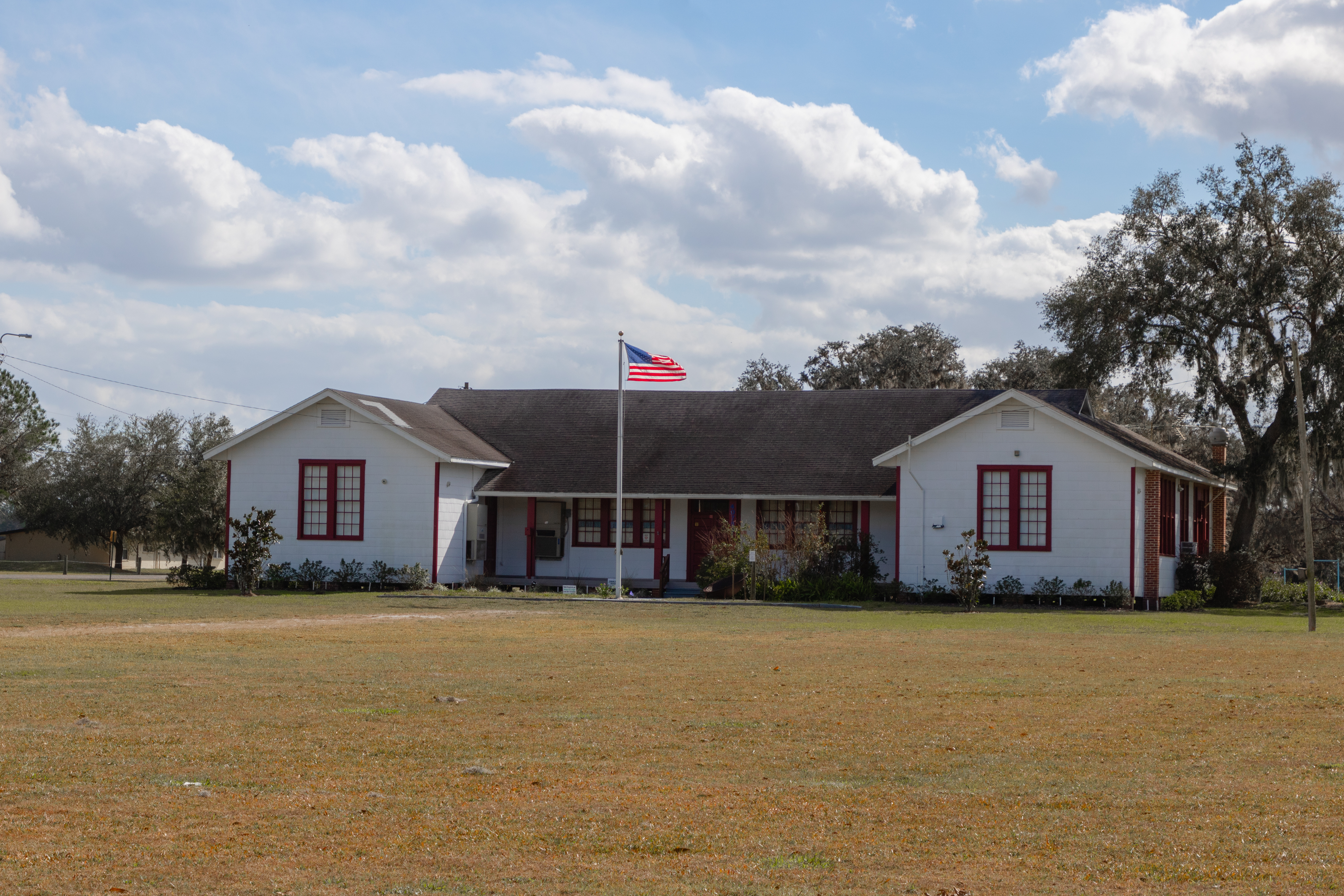

Information
- Established: 1930
- Closed: 2016
- Teaching staff: 2 (1930-1966); 1 (1966-2016)
- Grades: 1-8 (1930-1966); 1-4 (1966-2016)

Duette School is a historic school building in Duette, Florida, United States. Built in 1930, it was listed on the National Register of Historic Places on July 30, 2018.

The school was a two-teacher elementary and middle school teaching first through eighth grades through 1966 and was a one-teacher school for grades 1-4 thereafter until its closing in 2016.

== See also ==
- National Register of Historic Places listings in Manatee County, Florida
