= Whitfield, Manatee County, Florida =

Whitfield, Florida Whitfield Estates
- Census-designated place
- Location in Manatee County and the state of Florida
- Coordinates: 27°24′41″N 82°33′58″W
- Country: United States
- State: Florida
- County: Manatee

Area
  - Total: 1.40 sq mi (3.62 km^{2})
  - Land: 1.38 sq mi (3.57 km^{2})
  - Water: 0.019 sq mi (0.05 km^{2})
- Elevation: 16 ft (4.9 m)

Population (2020)
  - Total: 2,989
  - Density: 2,167.1/sq mi (836.74/km^{2})
- Time zone: UTC−05 (EST)
  - Summer (DST): UTC−04 (EDT)
- ZIP Code: 34243 (Sarasota)
- Area code: 941
- FIPS code: 12-77467
- GNIS feature ID: 2403025

Whitfield, also known as Whitfield Estates, is an unincorporated community and census-designated place (CDP) in Manatee County, Florida, United States. As of the 2020 census, it had a population of 2,989. It is part of the North Port–Bradenton–Sarasota Metropolitan Statistical Area. The unincorporated area has a Sarasota mailing address.

== History ==
Whitfield Estates was formerly a 682-acre (276 ha) wooded area that had been homesteaded by General John Riggin, aide-de-camp to Ulysses S. Grant. The property included the 218-acre (88 ha) bayfront estate of Alfred Ringling. In 1924, the property was purchased from Richard T. Ringling, son of Alfred, by a corporation called Whitfield Estates, Inc., held by Louis Broughton Whitfield, D. G. Haley, E. H. Price, and E. S. Delaplane Jr., who were from Alabama.

Louis Whitfield, a native of Montgomery, Alabama and president of the development, was founder and president of the Alaga Syrup Company and the W. W. Pickle Company. Many streets in the subdivision were named for the Whitfield family, including Broughton and Pearl. The original plan for Whitfield Estates called for a housing development, an 18-hole golf course, a hotel, a yacht basin, and man-made islands in the bay. Donald Ross was retained as the golf course architect. Sometime during late 1925 or very early into 1926, L. B. Whitfield abandoned the development and his interest was taken over by Adair Realty. In 1926, the developing neighborhood was incorporated as a city with E.S. Bond acting as mayor.

Like many other Florida land boom developments, it would ultimately fail to reach the goals set by its developers. One of the first signs of financial trouble was the decision to open membership of the Whitfield Estates County Club to residents of Sarasota and Bradenton, provided they agreed to cover the operating expenses associated with it. After the collapse of the boom, the residents of Whitfield would have difficulties staying there. Some homes underwent a series of different rentals, while those under construction were often left unfinished for several years.

With the 1929 stock market crash and the arrival of the Great Depression, the conditions further worsened for residents there. During the years of the Great Depression, there would be very little construction in Whitfield. In 1937 a group of club members ended up buying the golf course and club house, renaming it "Sarasota Bay Country Club". It was renamed once again in 1938 to "North Shore Country Club". During World War II, the club would close because of gasoline rationing and not being able to get golf balls. It eventually became overgrown, and after the war, the US Army assisted in restoring the golf course.

Whitfield Estates experienced a resurgence after World War II. Located near the Sarasota Army Airfield, the area became a popular location for families to settle during the post-war housing boom. This played a significant role in the community's recovery, with the establishment of the Whitfield Community Improvement Association in the mid-1940s. The club was given its current name, "Sara Bay Country Club", in 1964.

== National Register of Historic Places ==
The following districts and properties in the subdivision are listed on the National Register of Historic Places:

Resource name	Image	Address	Added
Whitfield Estates–Broughton Street Historic District		7207, 7211, 7215, 7219 and 7316 Broughton Street	October 29, 1993
John M. Beasley House		7706 Westmoreland Drive	March 5, 1996
Whitfield Estates–Lantana Avenue Historic District		332-336 Lantana Avenue	March 8, 1997
Austin House		227 Delmar Avenue	February 5, 1998
Reid–Woods House		373 Whitfield Avenue	August 31, 2000
Villa Serena Apartments		7014 Willow Street	September 29, 2000
Paul M. Souder House		242 Greenwood Avenue	November 2, 2000
Stevens–Gilchrist House		235 Delmar Avenue	August 17, 2001

Most of the above were listed as part of the 1996 Whitfield Estates Subdivision Multiple Property Submission (MPS).

== Geography ==
Whitfield is in southern Manatee County, on the northeast shore of Sarasota Bay. It is bordered to the north by Bowlees Creek and the unincorporated community of Bayshore Gardens, and to the southeast by Sarasota–Bradenton International Airport. It is 6 miles (10 km) north of the center of Sarasota and the same distance south of Bradenton, the Manatee county seat.

According to the United States Census Bureau, the Whitfield CDP has a total area of 1.4 square miles (3.6 km^{2}), of which 0.02 square miles (0.05 km^{2}), or 1.43%, are water.

== Demographics ==
Historical population
Census	Pop.	Note	%±
1990	3,152		—
2000	2,984		−5.3%
2010	2,882		−3.4%
2020	2,989		3.7%

As of the 2000 U.S. census, there were 2,984 people, 1,244 households, and 878 families residing in the CDP. The population density was 2,125.0 inhabitants per square mile (820.5/km^{2}). There were 1,364 housing units at an average density of 971.3 per square mile (375.0/km^{2}). The racial makeup of the CDP was 94.27% White, 2.98% African American, 0.13% Native American, 0.70% Asian, 0.07% Pacific Islander, 0.80% from other races, and 1.04% from two or more races. Hispanic or Latino of any race were 4.73% of the population.

There were 1,244 households, out of which 21.9% had children under the age of 18 living with them, 58.0% were married couples living together, 9.1% had a female householder with no husband present, and 29.4% were non-families. 20.8% of all households were made up of individuals, and 8.9% had someone living alone who was 65 years of age or older. The average household size was 2.40 and the average family size was 2.75.

In the CDP, the population was spread out, with 17.9% under the age of 18, 6.2% from 18 to 24, 26.9% from 25 to 44, 28.3% from 45 to 64, and 20.7% who were 65 years of age or older. The median age was 44 years. For every 100 females, there were 96.1 males. For every 100 females age 18 and over, there were 94.3 males.

The median income for a household in the CDP was $51,536, and the median income for a family was $54,009. Males had a median income of $35,444 versus $24,375 for females. The per capita income for the CDP was $25,408. About 3.3% of families and 6.3% of the population were below the poverty line, including 8.3% of those under age 18 and 6.6% of those age 65 or over.
