= Johnson Helm House =

Historic house in Florida, United States

- U.S. National Register of Historic Places
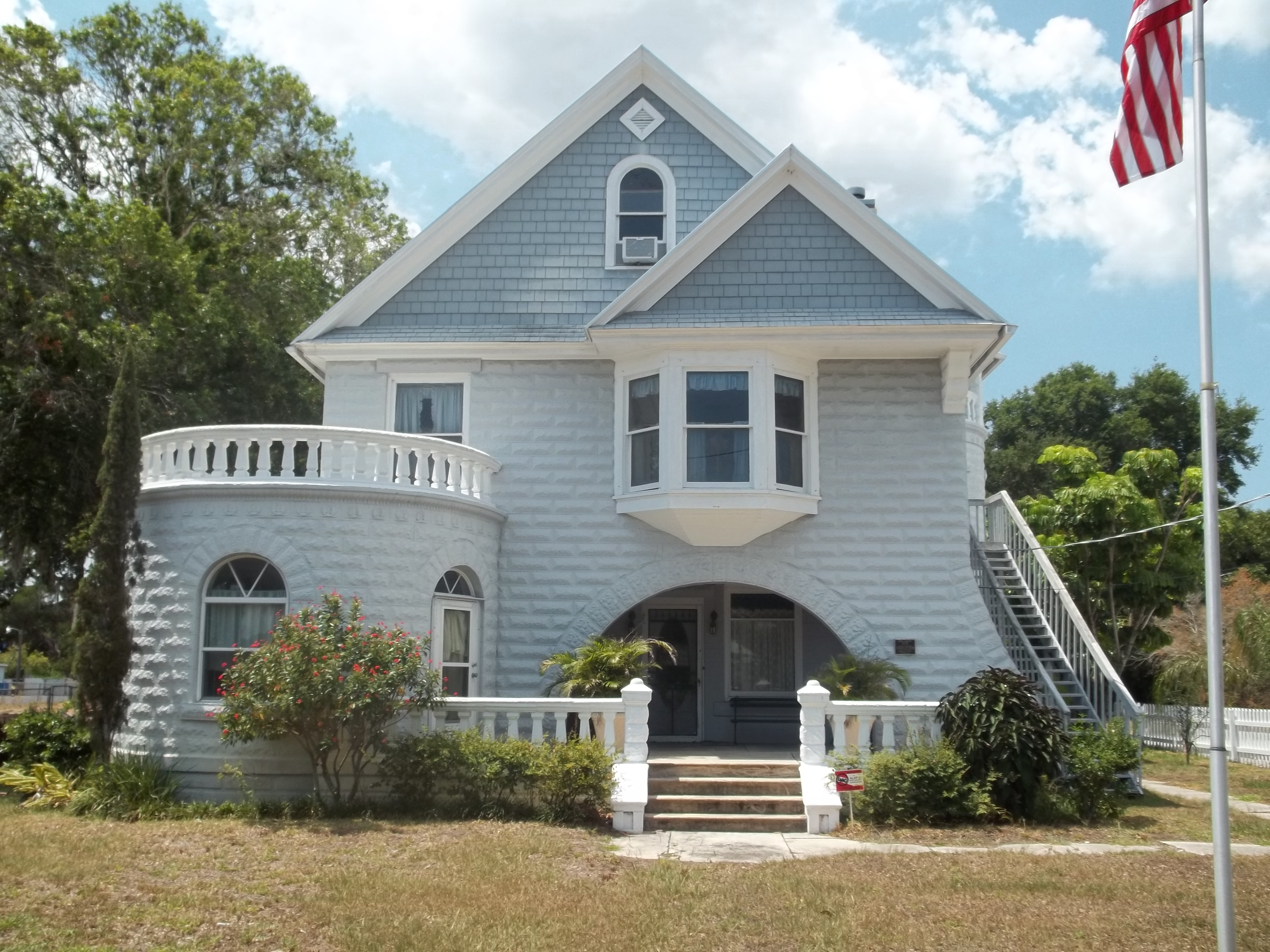
- Johnson Helm House in June 2011

- Location within Florida Location within the United States
- Location: 2104 53rd Avenue, East, Oneco, Florida
- Nearest city: Bradenton, Florida
- Coordinates: 27.44714°N 82.5381°W
- Built: 1908
- Built by: J.S. Maus
- Architectural style: Richardsonian Romanesque
- NRHP reference No.: 09000671
- Added to NRHP: September 2, 2009

The Johnson Helm House, also known as the Helm-Nanney House, is an historic 3-story Richardsonian Romanesque style stone house located at 2104 53rd Avenue, East, State Road 70, in Oneco, near Bradenton, Manatee County, Florida. It was built for Johnson Helm, who was born April 4, 1860, in Delaware County, Indiana, and who settled on this land in 1877 with his parents, John M. Helm and Mary J. (Neely) Helm. John Helm is credited with grubbing the land to plant orange trees. He became a successful grower and a director of the county's first bank, the Bank of Manatee in Braidentown, as it was then called. His land was described as being "a few rods from the Oneca (sic) post office, five miles from Braidentown."

The house, which is now owned by James P. Nanney and Margaret B. Nanney, was added to the National Register of Historic Places on September 2, 2009.
