= Snead Island =

Island in Manatee County, Florida, United States

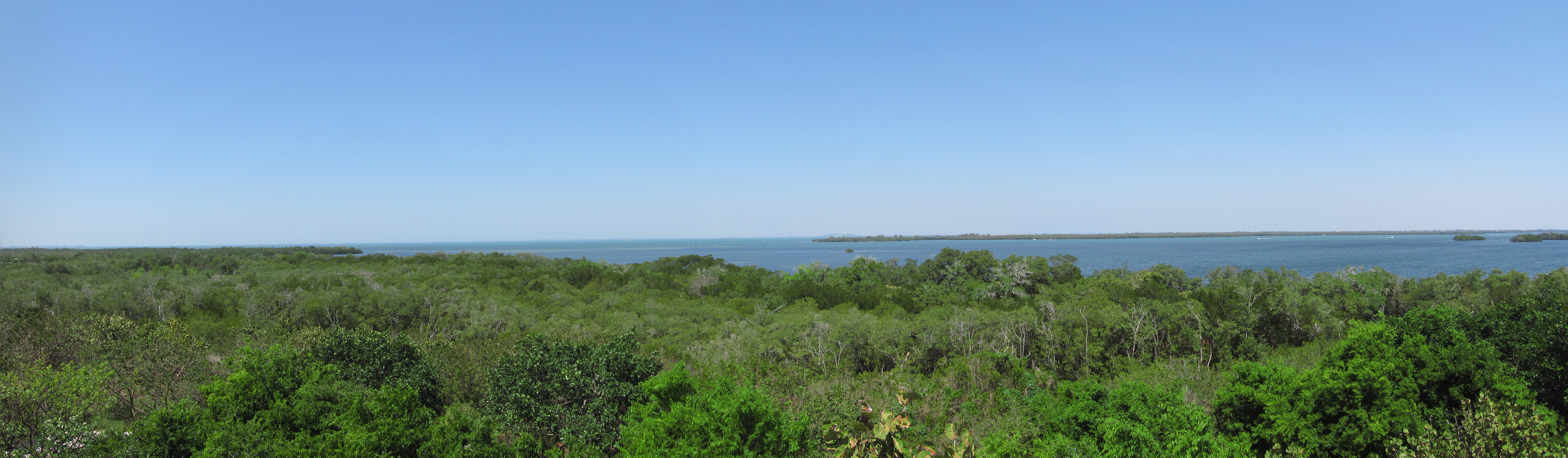
- Terra Ceia Bay from Emerson Point Preserve on Snead Island

- Snead Island Snead Island (the Caribbean)

Geography
- Location: Manatee County, Florida
- Coordinates: 27.5358895°N 82.608216°W
- Adjacent to: Gulf of Mexico
- Area: 365 acres (148 ha)

Administration
- United States
- State: Florida
- County: Manatee

Snead Island is a small island to the west of Palmetto, Florida. The island is primarily residential, although there are two private dry boat storage facilities or boatworks located on the island. Remnants of a former palm tree nursery also are located on the island. The island is located on two bays and a river, to the north and northeast is Terra Ceia Bay, to the west is Tampa Bay, and to the south is the Manatee River. On the western end of Snead Island is Emerson Point Preserve, a 365 acres (1.48 km^{2}) preserve operated by Manatee County. The preserve includes several Native American mounds designated as the Portavant Mound Site, which is listed on the National Register of Historic Places. The land from which the preserve was made, previously had been owned by the Horton family.

== History ==
This area of Florida was inhabited seasonally for approximately five thousand years by Native Americans who were hunters and gatherers. As the waters of the ocean rose and the area became coastline along the Gulf of Mexico with the bays and the river, the changes in the habitat of the area afforded development of maritime culture on the island. Peoples of the Safety Harbor culture are credited with the construction of the mounds found on the island today, made with the shells from their fishing from the bountiful waters surrounding it during the period of 900 A.D. to 1725 A.D.

The first officially recorded non-native settler to Snead Island was Edward Sneed, who established a homestead in 1843 under the Armed Occupation Act of 1842. The island was named for this first settler. In newspapers and other documents, the name of the island can be found spelled as either Sneed Island or Snead Island, as well as Sneed's Island and Snead's Island. Eventually, the misspelling of the first settler's name became the official name of the island.

Sometime during the American Civil War, the U.S. Kingfish, commanded by Joseph H. Hallet, would land at the site of what was formerly a Native American mound at the Emerson Point Preserve. At one point, he and the soldiers under his command found a barracks that they burned to the ground. They also captured three boats.

Despite its name from the earliest of records, initially, it was not much of an island. Snead Island was only separated from the Palmetto mainland by a shallow mudflat that was home to many oysters and mangroves. Although that channel was nearly dry during low tide, at other times it was frequently used by small sailing vessels as a shortcut to Terra Ceia Bay from the Manatee River.

In 1900, the channel, called "the Cut-Off” was dredged deeply enough to allow steamers to pass. This dredging solidified Snead Island's status as a legitimate island, and a barge-ferry had to be used to make the connection from the island to the mainland before a bridge was built. In 1920, the Davis Toll Bridge across the Manatee River that connected the towns of Manatee and Palmetto was disassembled and its pieces were used to create the Snead Island Bridge.

== Overview ==
Much of the island remains undeveloped. Most of the island's residents are native Floridians, which is atypical in the surrounding Manatee County area.
