= Stevens–Gilchrist House =

Historic house in Florida, United States

- Stevens--Gilchrist House
- U.S. National Register of Historic Places
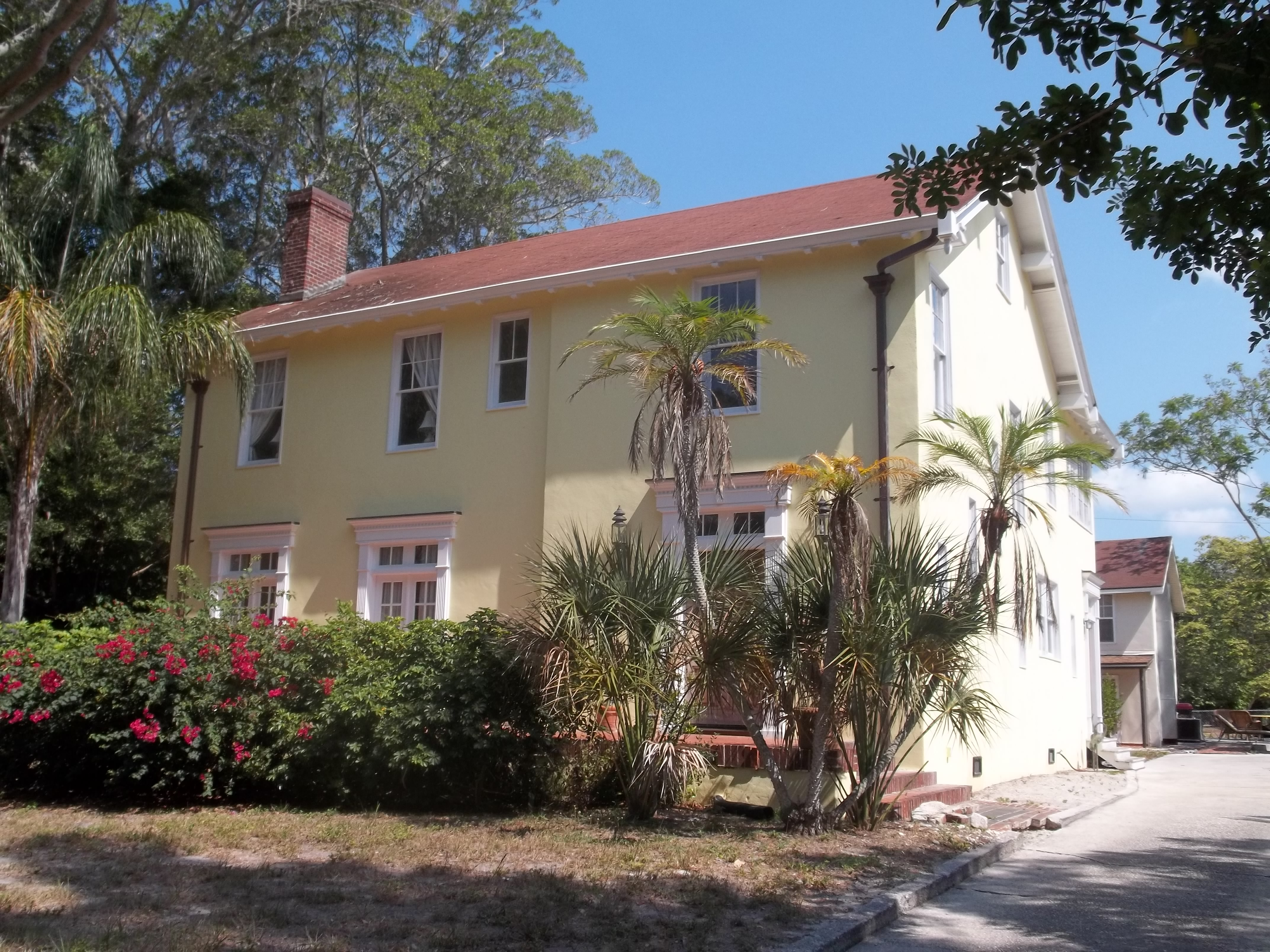

- Location within Florida Location within the United States
- Location: 235 Delmar Ave., Sarasota, Florida
- Coordinates: 27°24′13″N 82°34′13″W
- Area: less than one acre
- Built: 1926
- Built by: Monk, Thomas A.
- MPS: Whitfield Estates Subdivision MPS
- NRHP reference No.: 01000887
- Added to NRHP: August 17, 2001

The Stevens–Gilchrist House, at 235 Delmar Avenue in Whitfield, Manatee County, Florida, is located in the Whitfield Estates Subdivision in the Sarasota metropolitan area, and was built in 1926. It has also been known as Norrie House. Although the Whitfield Estates Subdivision is in Manatee County, Florida, not in the city of Sarasota, Florida (in Sarasota County) proper, residents use "Sarasota" as their mailing address and have associated themselves more with Sarasota, just to the south, rather than with Bradenton a bit further to the north.

The Whitfield Estates Subdivision is a residential development that was platted in 1925. The Stevens–Gilchrist House is among its first houses, built in 1926.

The house was listed on the National Register of Historic Places in 2001. A stucco over frame garage/servants quarters building is included in the listing.
