= Palmetto Armory =

- U.S. National Register of Historic Places
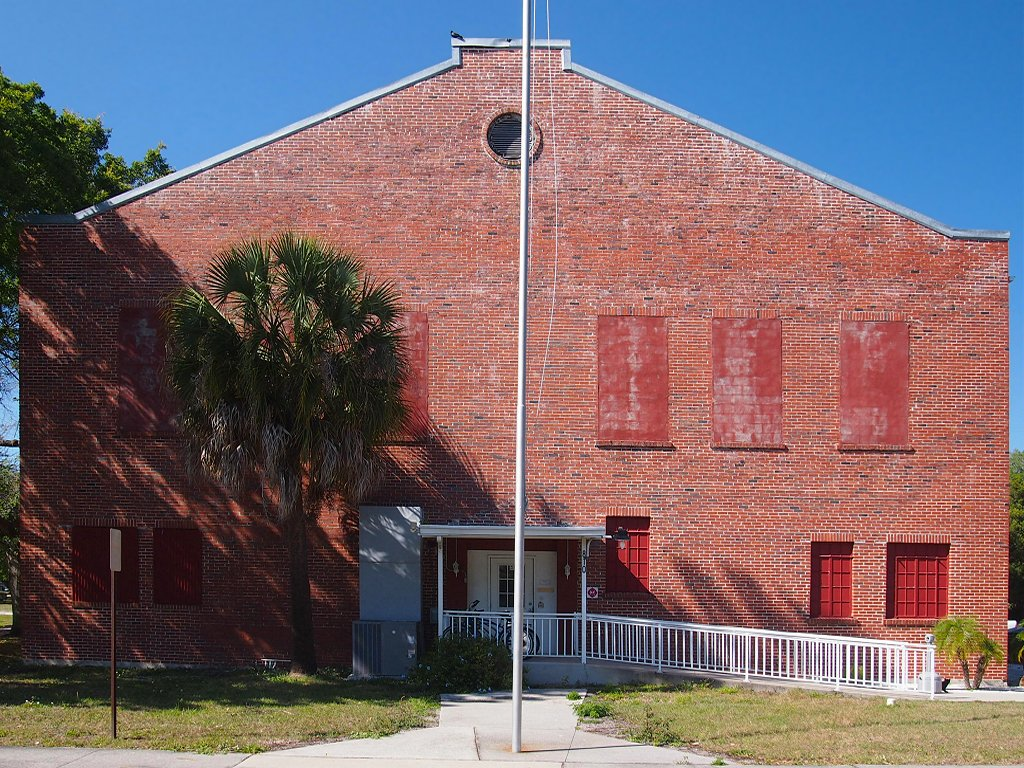

- Location within Florida Location within the United States
- Location: Palmetto, Florida
- Coordinates: 27°31′00″N 82°34′27″W
- NRHP reference No.: 12000865
- Added to NRHP: October 17, 2012

Palmetto Armory is a national historic site located at 810 6th St., W., Palmetto, Florida in Manatee County. It has been used as VFW Post 2488. It was added to the National Register of Historic Places on October 17, 2012.
