= Kreissle Forge =

- U.S. National Register of Historic Places
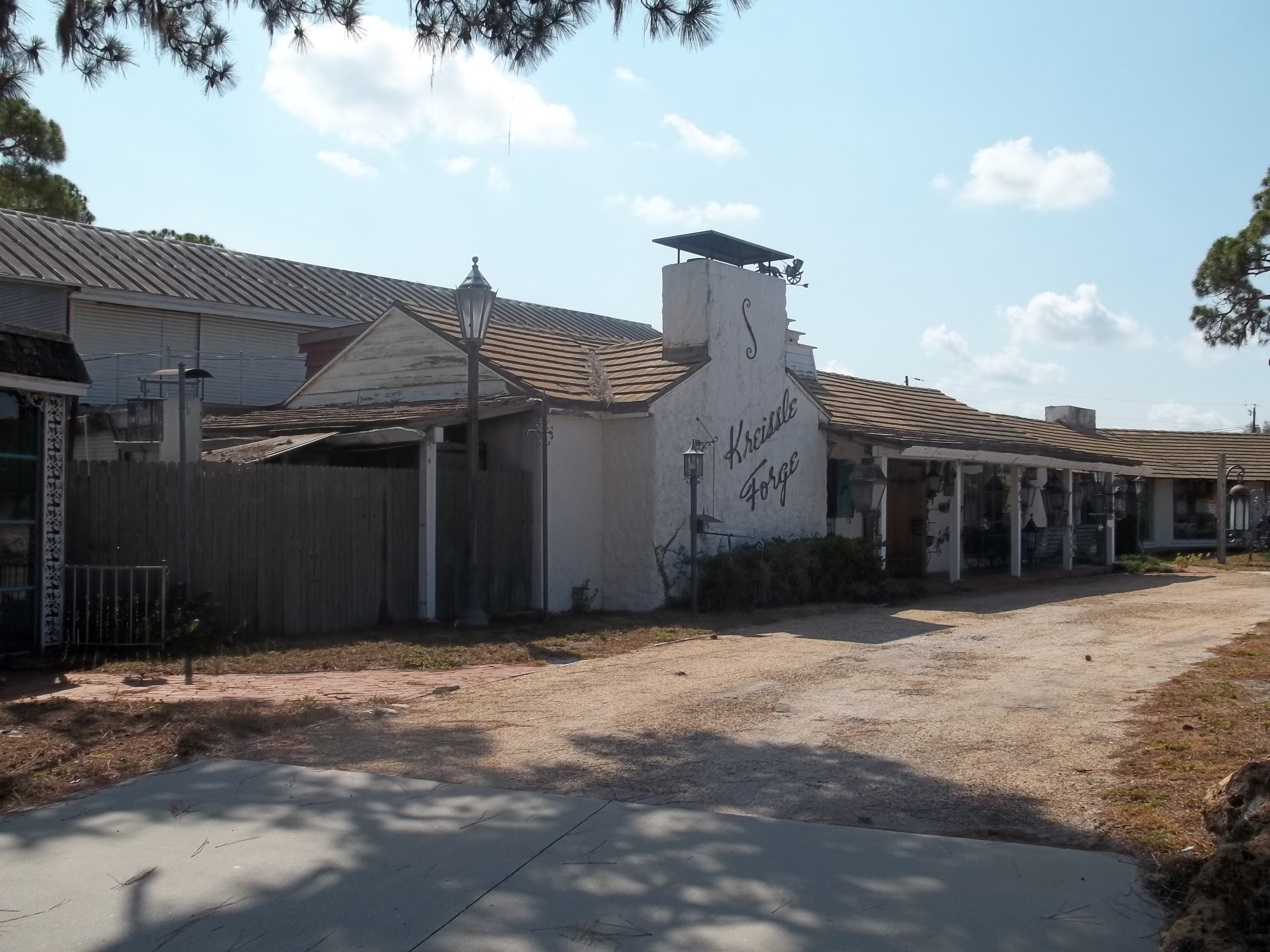

- Location within Florida Location within the United States
- Location: Sarasota, Manatee County, Florida
- Coordinates: 27°24′2″N 82°33′54″W
- NRHP reference No.: 96001370
- Added to NRHP: December 2, 1996

The Kreissle Forge (also known as the Kreissle Forge and Ornamental Iron Works) is a historic site in Sarasota, Florida, United States. It is located at 7947 Tamiami Trail. On December 2, 1996, it was added to the U.S. National Register of Historic Places.
