= Portavant Mound =

Archaeological site in Florida, United States

- Portavant Mound Site
- U.S. National Register of Historic Places
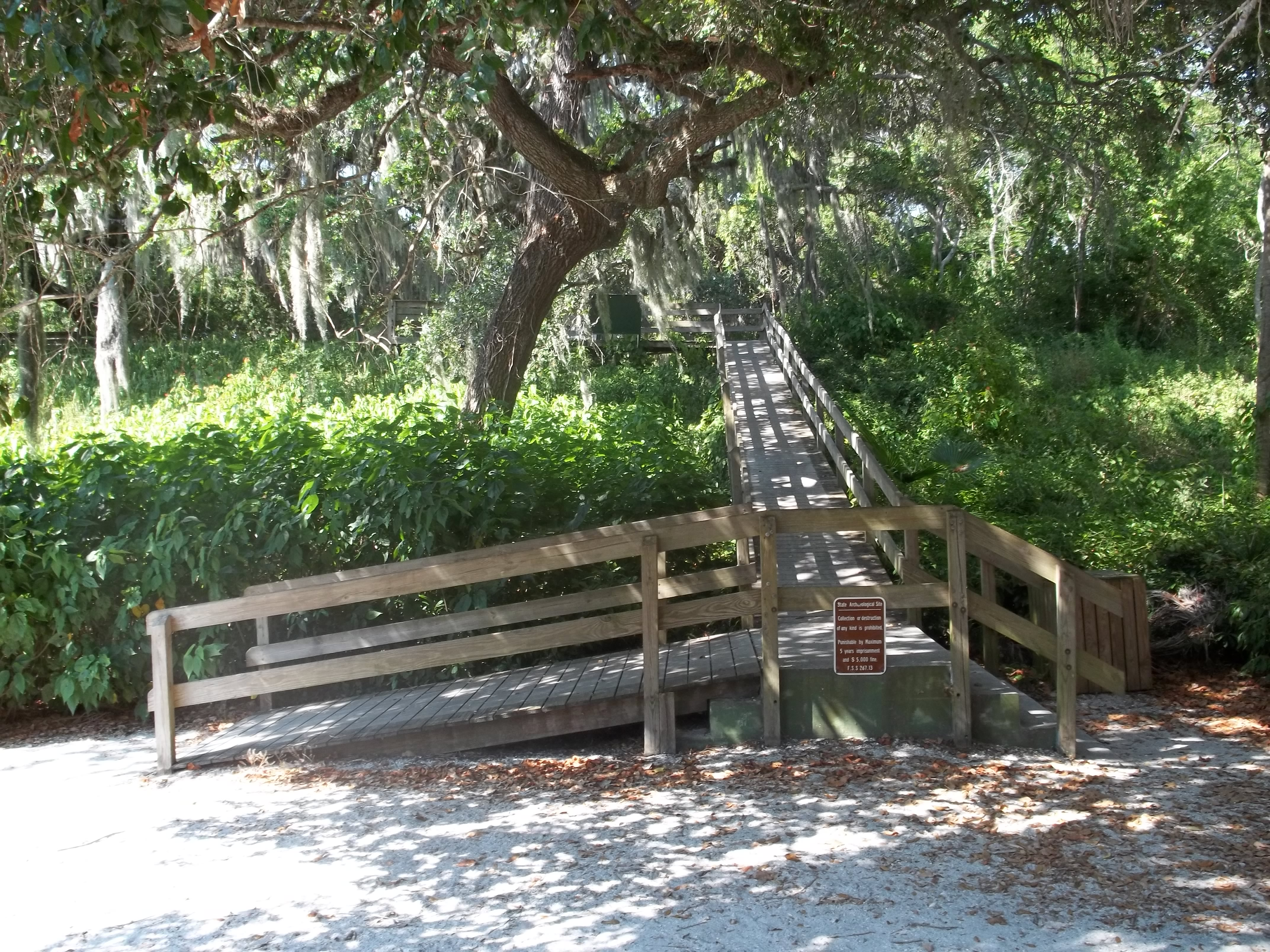

- Location within Florida
- Location: Manatee County, Florida; Address restricted
- Nearest city: Palmetto
- Coordinates: 27°31′52″N 82°37′33″W
- NRHP reference No.: 94001475
- Added to NRHP: December 23, 1994

The Portavant Mound (also known as the Portavant Mound Site or Snead Island Temple Mound or Portavant Indian Mound) is an archaeological site on Snead Island within the Emerson Point Preserve, just west of Palmetto, Florida. On December 23, 1994, it was added to the U.S. National Register of Historic Places.

The Portavant Mound (or Snead Island Temple Mound) is one of fifteen or more "temple mounds" produced by the Safety Harbor culture (900–1725) found in the vicinity of Tampa Bay. The mound is four meters high, measures 45 m by 75 m at the base, and has a flat top that is 24 m by 46 m. Unlike other "temple mounds" around the Tampa Bay area, the Portavant Mound does not have a ramp to the top of the mound. There is a lower (one m high) platform, about 30 m by 30 m, that abuts the main mound. The Portavant Mound was made from soil mixed with debris from middens. Several other mounds, also consisting of soil mixed with midden debris, are near the "temple mound".

The Portavant Mound site has been the target of a stabilization project to protect the mounds from damage from river erosion, looting, foot traffic, and exotic vegetation.

== See also ==
- Emerson Point Preserve
- Snead Island
