= Emerson Point Preserve =

Preserve in Manatee County, Florida, US

- Emerson Point Park
- IUCN category V (protected landscape/seascape)
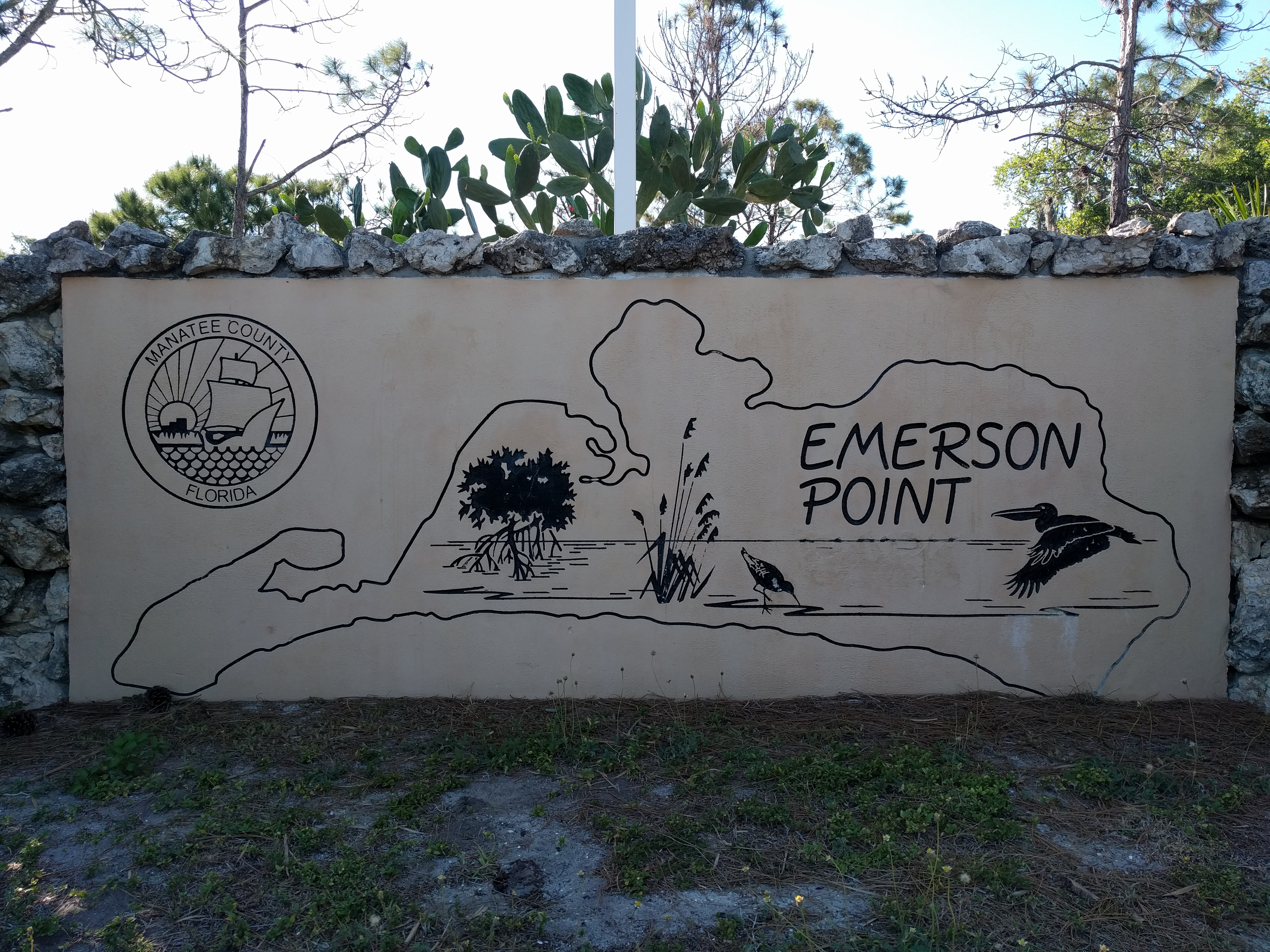
- Entrance of Emerson Point Preserve

- Location within Florida Location within the United States
- Location: Manatee County, Florida
- Nearest city: Palmetto
- Coordinates: 27.535°N 82.635°W
- Area: 365 acres (1.48 km^{2})
- Established: October 23, 1991
- Operator: Manatee County
- Website: Official website

Emerson Point Preserve is a 365-acre (1.48 km^{2}) preserve in Manatee County, Florida, located west of Palmetto and at the western end of Snead Island.

== History ==
The majority of Emerson Point was undeveloped until preliminary site plans were submitted to the County in the early 1980s for an eight-story condo on a three-acre site at the tip of Emerson Point. Due to local opposition, the County suspended the condo project after considering to seek public acquisition of the land. The initial portion of what was then referred to as "Emerson Point Park” was acquired by the State in 1991, with approximately 195 acres acquired under the Conservation and Recreation Lands (CARL) program (exists today as the Florida Forever program) on October 23, 1991, under a 70% State, 30% County funding initiative.

== Features ==
The preserve is home to several Native American mounds in the Portavant Mound Site. The preserve also has an observation tower that provides views of Terra Ceia Bay, Tampa Bay, and the Sunshine Skyway Bridge.
