= Woman's Club of Palmetto =

Historic building in Palmetto, Florida

- U.S. National Register of Historic Places
- U.S. Historic district – Contributing property
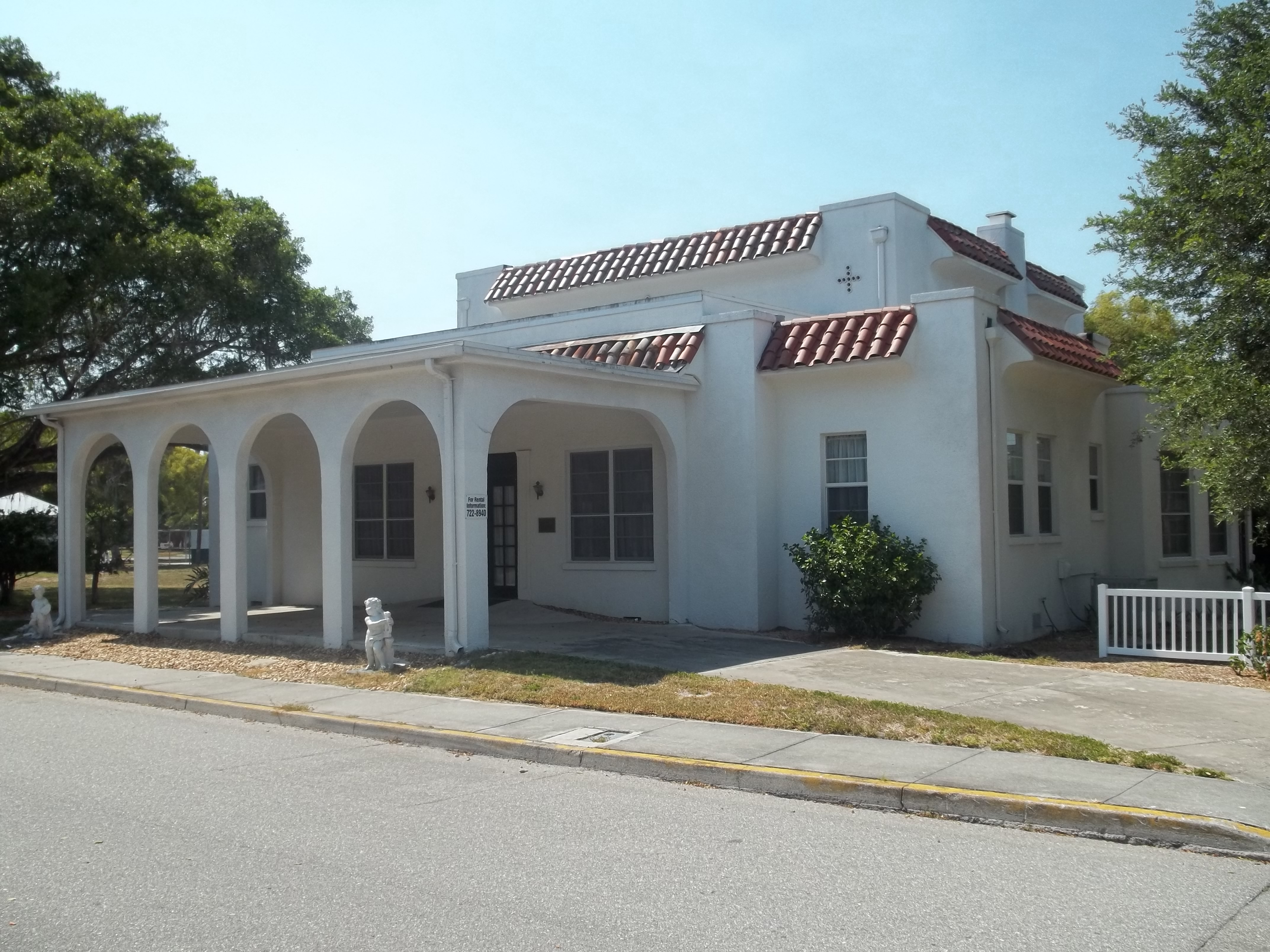

- Location within Florida Location within the United States
- Location: 910 Sixth St. W, Palmetto, Florida
- Coordinates: 27°30′59″N 82°34′29″W
- Area: less than one acre
- Built: 1930
- Built by: J.A. Smith
- Architect: Fred Kermode
- Architectural style: Late 19th and 20th Century Revivals, Mediterranean Revival
- Part of: Palmetto Historic District (ID86003166)
- NRHP reference No.: 86000380

Significant dates
- Added to NRHP: March 6, 1986
- Designated CP: November 6, 1986

The Woman's Club of Palmetto is a women's club and is also the name of its historic building in Palmetto, Florida. It is located at 910 Sixth Street West. The building was added to the National Register of Historic Places in March 1986.

The Woman's Club of Palmetto was founded in 1900, originally as the "Village Improvement Association". In 1905 it became the "Village Improvement and Library Association" and sought to develop a library. Eventually it applied for and got funding for a Carnegie library. The resulting library, built in 1914, is also included in the Palmetto Historic District. It was organized as a Women's club in 1915 and obtained a charter for that in 1916.

Mrs. Fred Kermode was Club President in 1926-27, and in 1929 became Chairman of the Building Committee. Her husband, who was probably the first architect in Palmetto, was commissioned to design a new clubhouse building.

The building completed in 1930 is a concrete block and stucco building having one- and two-story sections. It has "modest" Mediterranean Revival styling.

The building was deemed significant both for its architecture and for its historical associations.

It was also included as a contributing building in the Palmetto Historic District, which was added to the National Register in November 1986.

== See also ==
- List of Registered Historic Woman's Clubhouses in Florida
