= Duette, Florida =

Unincorporated area in the United States

- Unincorporated area
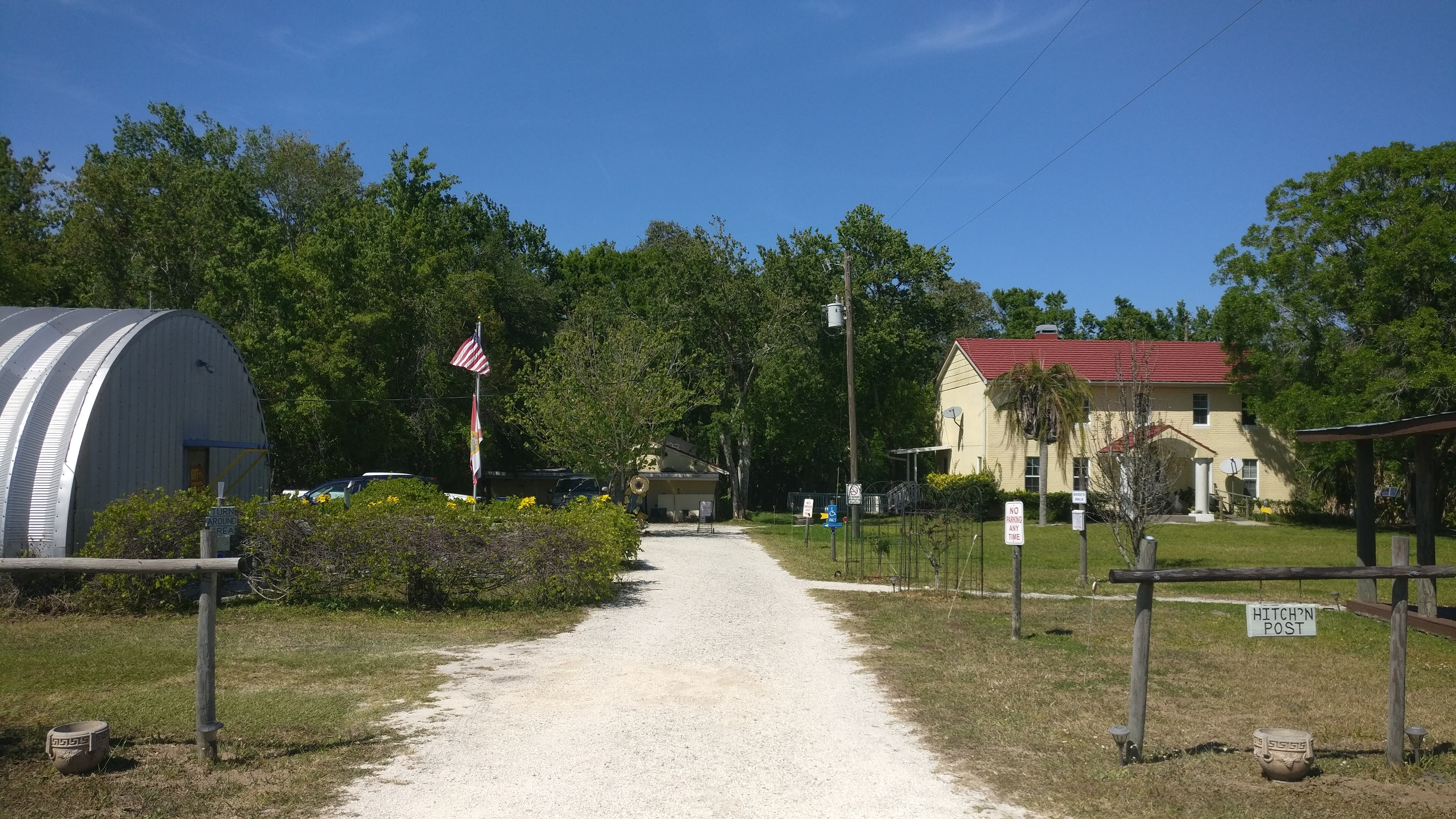
- Bunker Hill Vineyard and Winery, March 2018

- Location within Manatee County, Florida
- Coordinates: 27°35′25″N 82°07′22″W
- Country: United States
- State: Florida
- County: Manatee
- Established: 1888
- Elevation: 121 ft (37 m)
- Time zone: UTC−05:00 (EST)
  - Summer (DST): UTC−04:00 (EDT)
- ZIP Code: 34219
- Area code: 941
- FIPS code: 12-18475
- GNIS feature ID: 294750

Duette is an unincorporated community in Manatee County, Florida, United States. State Road 62 intersects with Keentown Road in Duette. The area is home to Duette Preserve and Bunker Hill Vineyard and Winery. The only remaining single-classroom schoolhouse in Florida, Duette School, is on the National Register of Historic Places.

== History ==
Local lore explains that the area's name stems for an early settler named Duette from Canada. While no records indicate this surname purchasing land in Manatee County, in the earliest years of settlement some homesteaders never established legal claim over their land, and therefore a record may not exist. The area was also referred to as Dry Prairie. A post office called Duette was established on July 17, 1888. It remained in operation until January 2, 1907.

The annual Duette Cracker Fest, an open-air fair and concert, was held to raise funds for education to prevent the proposed closing of the local one-teacher elementary school by the Manatee County School District. In 2016, it was announced that the school was to be permanently closed after a lack of students and financial reasons. The area is also home to Duette Preserve, the largest preserve in the Manatee county system.
