= Whitfield Estates–Broughton Street Historic District =

Historic district in Florida, United States

- U.S. National Register of Historic Places
- U.S. Historic district
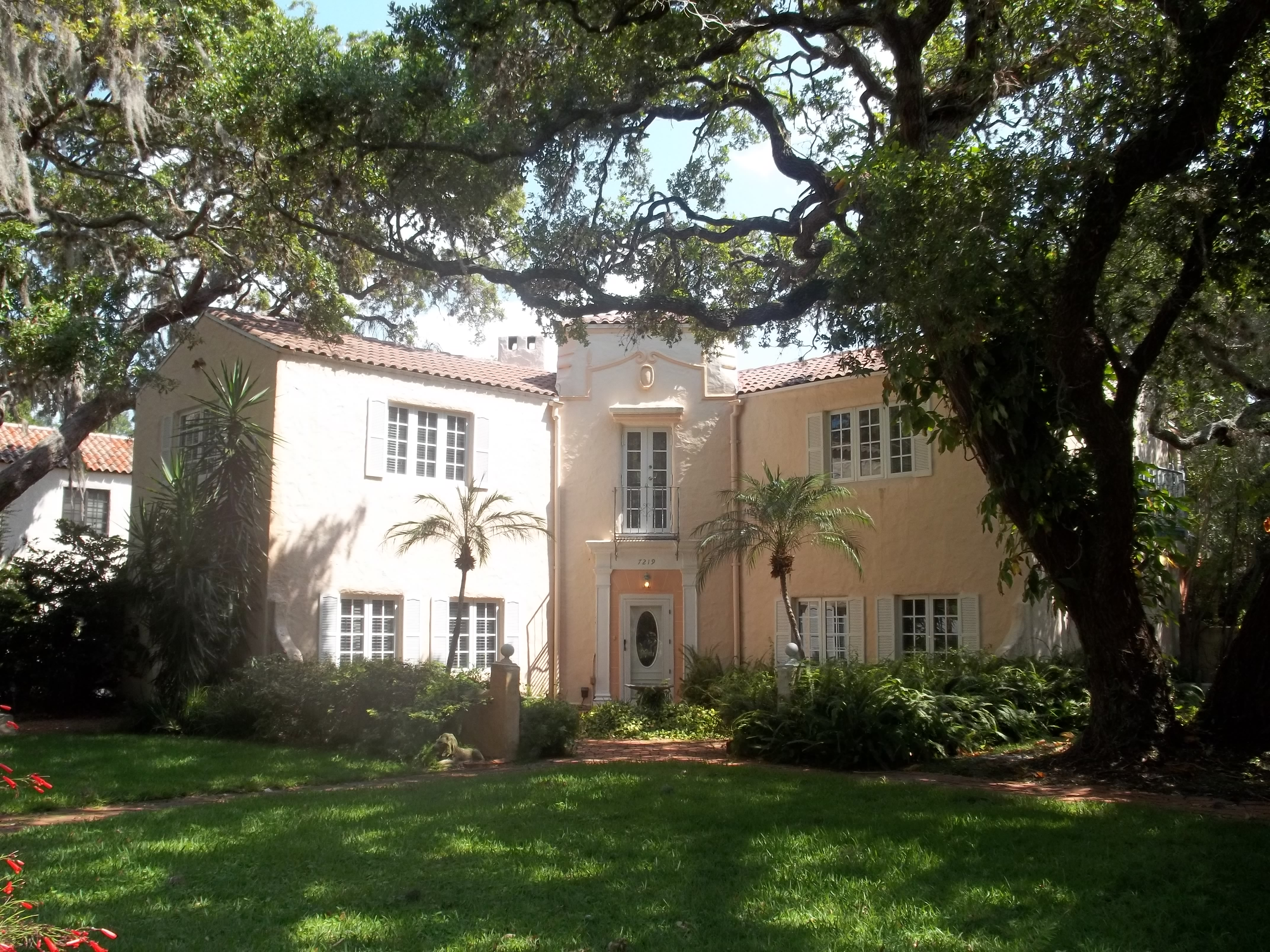

- Location within Florida Location within the United States
- Location: Sarasota, Florida
- Coordinates: 27°24′41″N 82°34′36″W
- Area: 2.8 acres (1.1 ha)
- NRHP reference No.: 93001159
- Added to NRHP: October 29, 1993

The Whitfield Estates–Broughton Street Historic District is a historic district in Sarasota, Florida, United States. It comprises 7207, 7211, 7215, 7219 and 7316 Broughton Street: five residences and three garages built in Mediterranean Revival style 1925–1929, including four early works by architect Ralph Twitchell. On October 29, 1993, the district was added to the National Register of Historic Places. It was listed for being the most intact concentration of early residences in the Whitfield Estates Subdivision, a major housing development established during the Florida land boom of the 1920s.
