= Whitfield Estates–Lantana Avenue Historic District =

Historic district in Florida, United States

- U.S. National Register of Historic Places
- U.S. Historic district
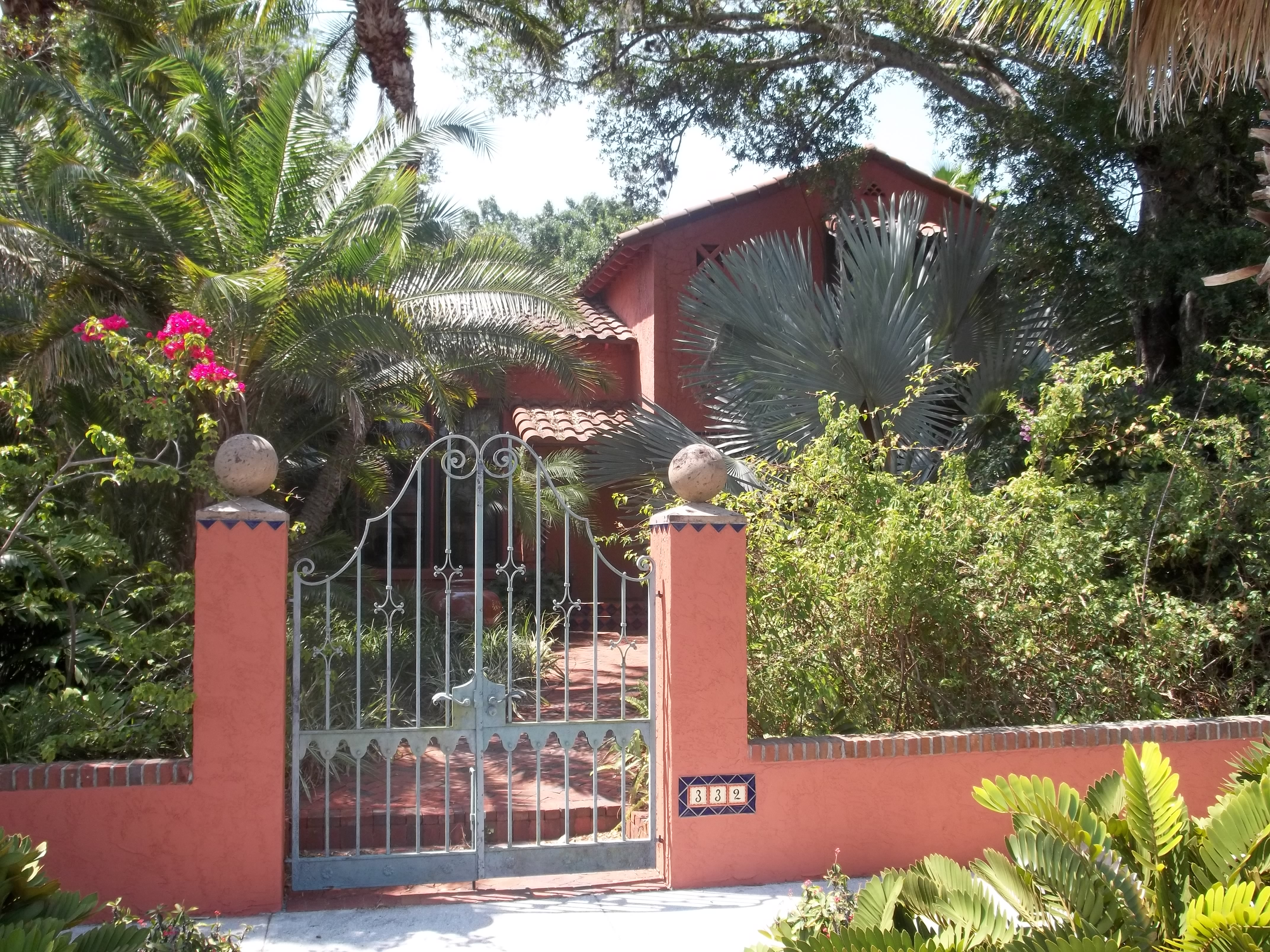

- Location within Florida Location within the United States
- Location: Manatee County, Florida
- Nearest city: Sarasota, Florida
- Coordinates: 27°24′49″N 82°34′9″W
- Area: 1.8 acres (0.73 ha)
- MPS: Whitfield Estates Subdivision MPS
- NRHP reference No.: 97000209
- Added to NRHP: March 8, 1997

The Whitfield Estates–Lantana Avenue Historic District is a U.S. historic district in Whitfield Estates, north of Sarasota, Florida. It includes 332 through 356 Lantana Avenue, comprising four intact houses and two garages built 1925–1926. On March 8, 1997, it was added to the National Register of Historic Places. The district was listed for being Whitfield Estates' best surviving row illustrating the residential streetscape of the middle-class subdivisions that sprang up during the Florida land boom of the 1920s.

This district is part of the Whitfield Estates Subdivision Multiple Property Submission.
