= John M. Beasley House =

Historic house in Florida, United States

- U.S. National Register of Historic Places
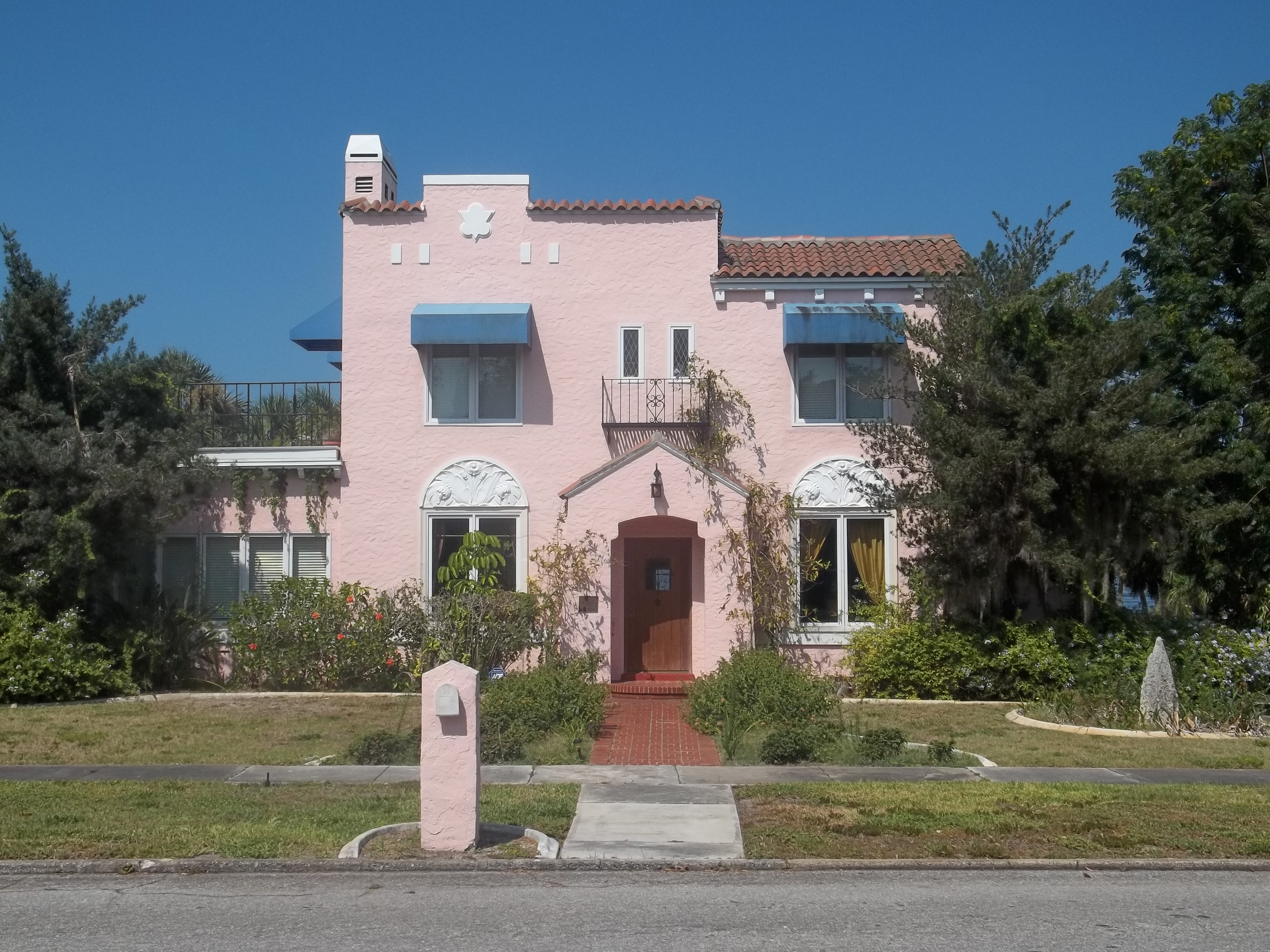

- Location within Florida Location within the United States
- Location: Sarasota, Florida
- Coordinates: 27°24′12″N 82°34′16″W
- Area: less than one acre
- Architectural style: Mission/Spanish Revival
- MPS: Whitfield Estates Subdivision MPS
- NRHP reference No.: 96000358
- Added to NRHP: September 23, 1996

John M. Beasley House is a house at 7706 Westmoreland Drive, Sarasota, Florida in Manatee County which was built in Mediterranean Revival style in 1926. It was added to the National Register of Historic Places in 1996.

It is a two-story, frame residence covered with stucco, upon a concrete foundation. It has a gable roof with barrel tile sections and it has flat roof sections. Some shallow eaves are supported by simple wood brackets. The property also includes a non-contributing garage.

It is located in the Whitfield Estates Subdivision.
