= Reid–Woods House =

Historic house in Florida, United States

- Reid-Woods House
- U.S. National Register of Historic Places
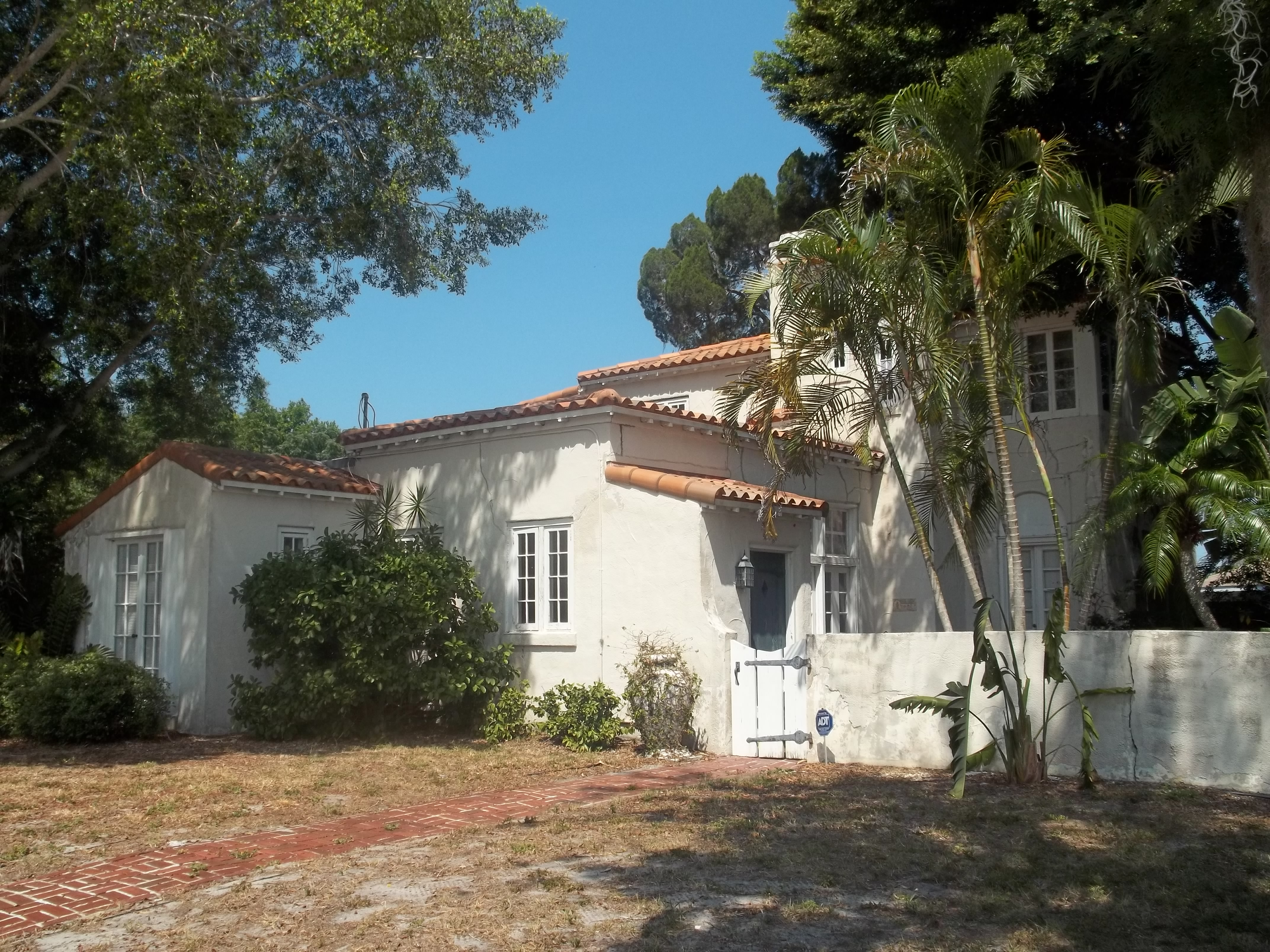

- Location within Florida Location within the United States
- Location: 373 Whitfield Ave., Whitfield Estates, north of Sarasota, Florida
- Coordinates: 27°24′45″N 82°34′6″W
- Built: c. 1926
- Architectural style: Mediterranean Revival
- MPS: Whitfield Estates Subdivision MPS
- NRHP reference No.: 00001033
- Added to NRHP: August 31, 2000

Reid-Woods House is a Mediterranean Revival-style house located at 373 Whitfield Avenue in the Whitfield Estates subdivision in the southern part of Manatee County, Florida. Built c. 1926, it was listed on the National Register of Historic Places in 2000.

It is "a finely detailed" house with an irregular plan. It has "multiplanar roofs, including gable, hip, flat, and shed roofs", with all but the flat roof sections covered by barrel clay tile.

Its interior floor plan remained intact as of its NRHP listing in 2000.
