= Palmetto Historic District =

Historic district in Florida, United States

- U.S. National Register of Historic Places
- U.S. Historic district
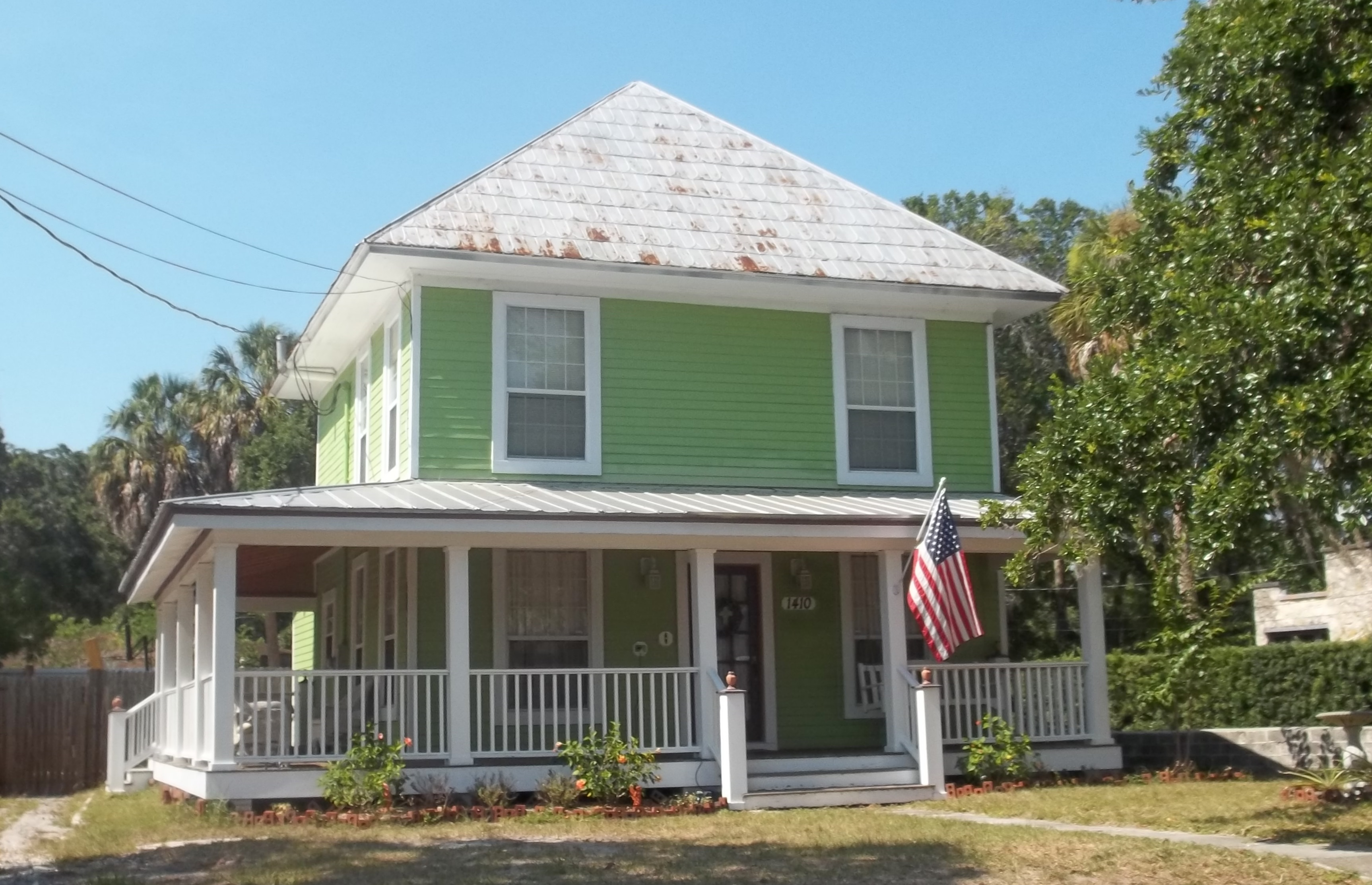
- James Dixon House - Built 1917

- Location within Florida Location within the United States
- Location: Roughly bounded by Twenty-first Ave., Seventh St., Fifth Ave., and the Manatee River, Palmetto, Florida
- Coordinates: 27°30′53″N 82°34′41″W
- Area: 156 acres (63 ha)
- Built: 1902
- Architectural style: Late 19th and 20th Century Revivals, Bungalow/Craftsman, Stick/Eastlake
- NRHP reference No.: 86003166
- Added to NRHP: November 6, 1986

The Palmetto Historic District is a nationally recognized historic district, bounded by Twenty-first Avenue, Seventh Street, Fifth Avenue, and the Manatee River in Palmetto, Florida. It was added to the National Register of Historic Places in 1986. The district includes the Palmetto Historical Park and the various historical buildings and museums it contains. It also includes the 1930-built building of the Palmetto Women's Club, which was listed on the National Register earlier in 1986. And it includes the 1914-built Carnegie library whose construction was a major accomplishment of the 1900-founded women's club.

In 1985, the 156 acres (63 ha) area included 292 buildings, 208 of which were deemed contributing buildings. The 84 non-contributing ones are not terribly instrusive, as they "generally respect the setback, scale and proportions of the contributing buildings."

== Gallery ==
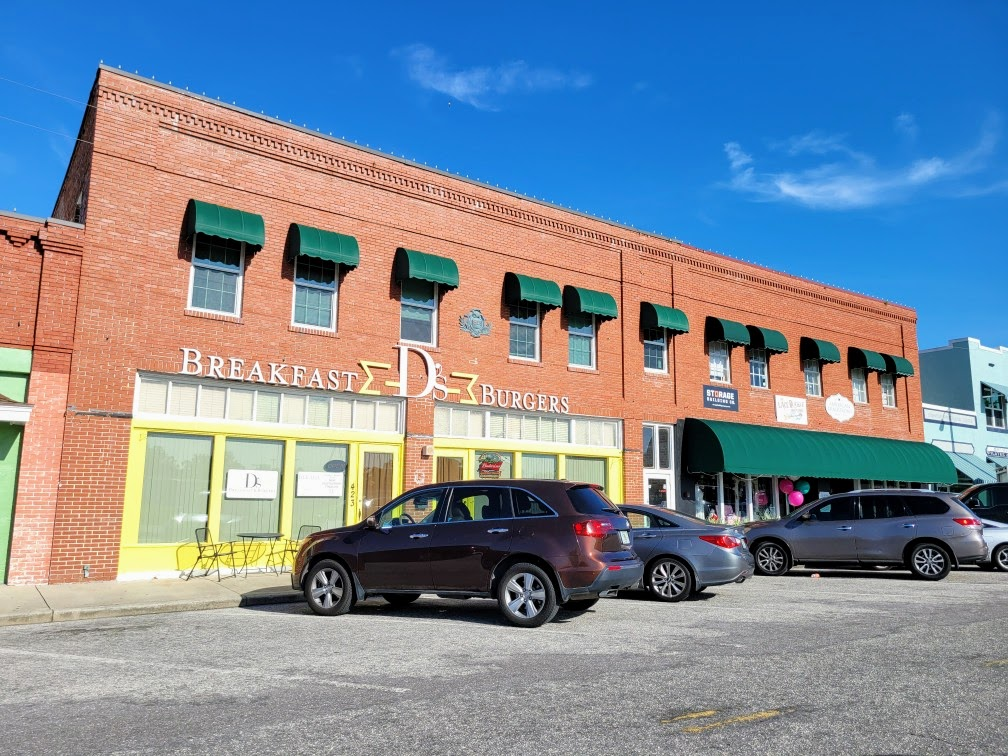
Beall-Theus Dry Goods - Built 1912

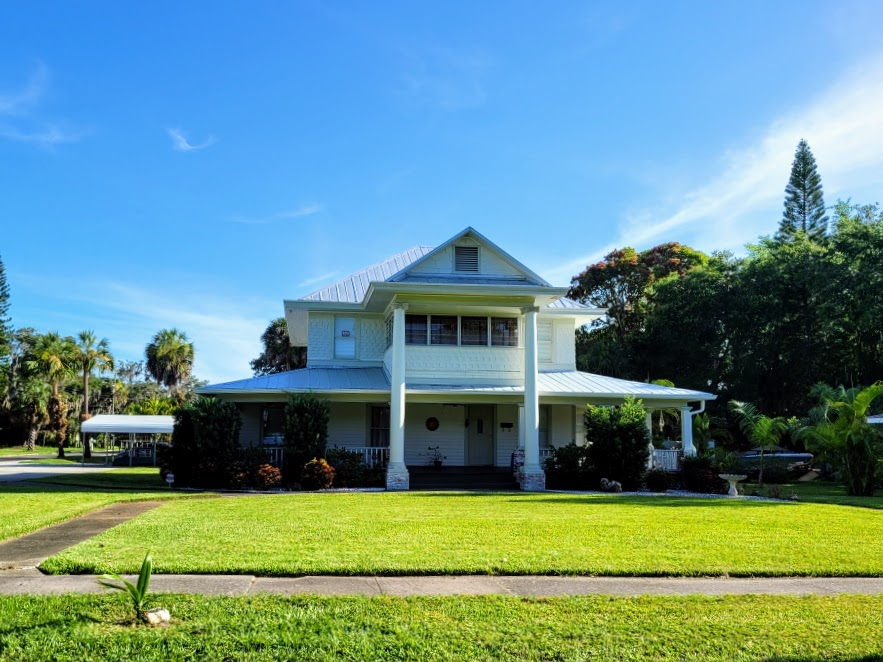
C. A. & May Phillips House - Built 1913

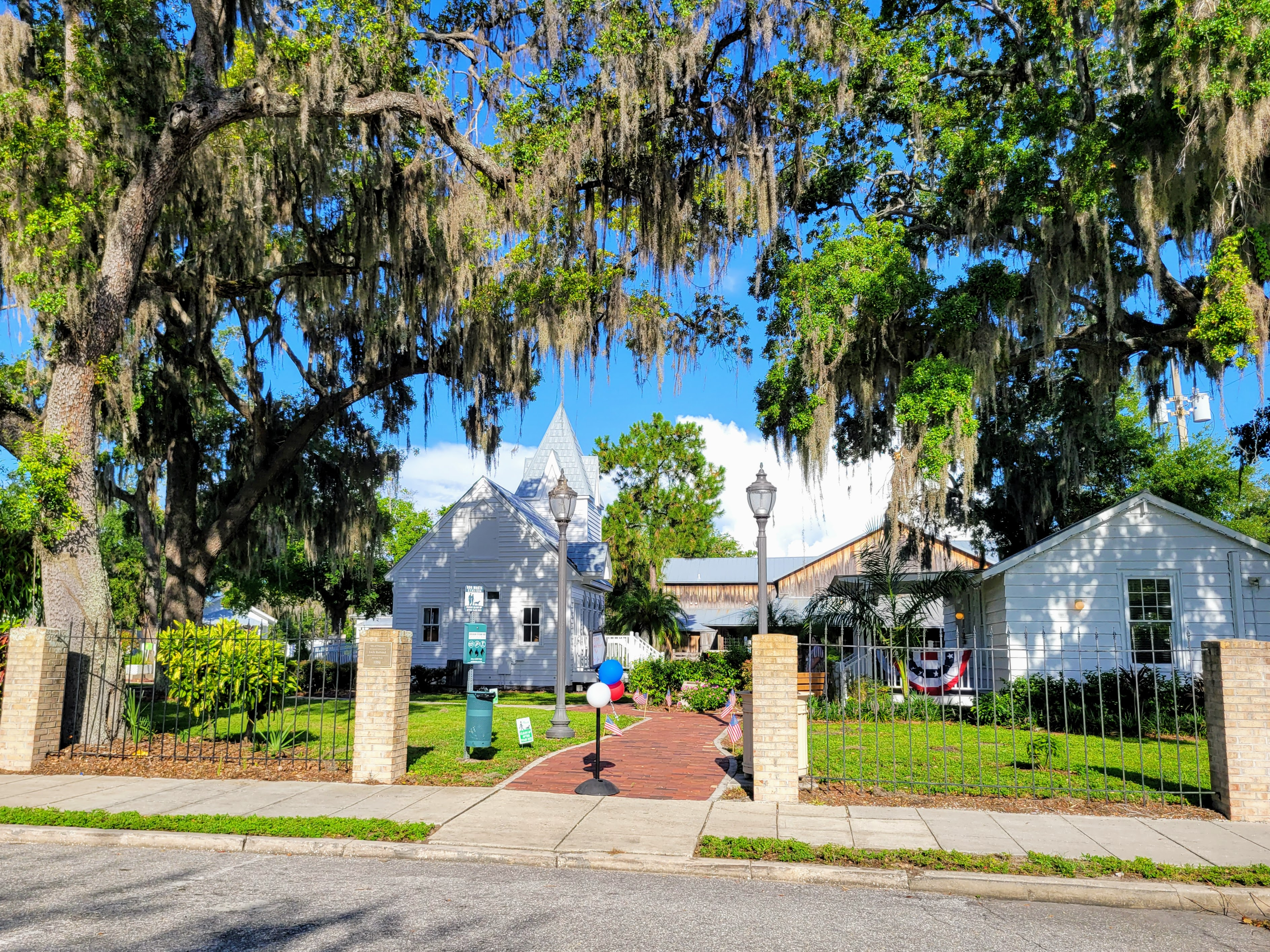
Palmetto Historic Park

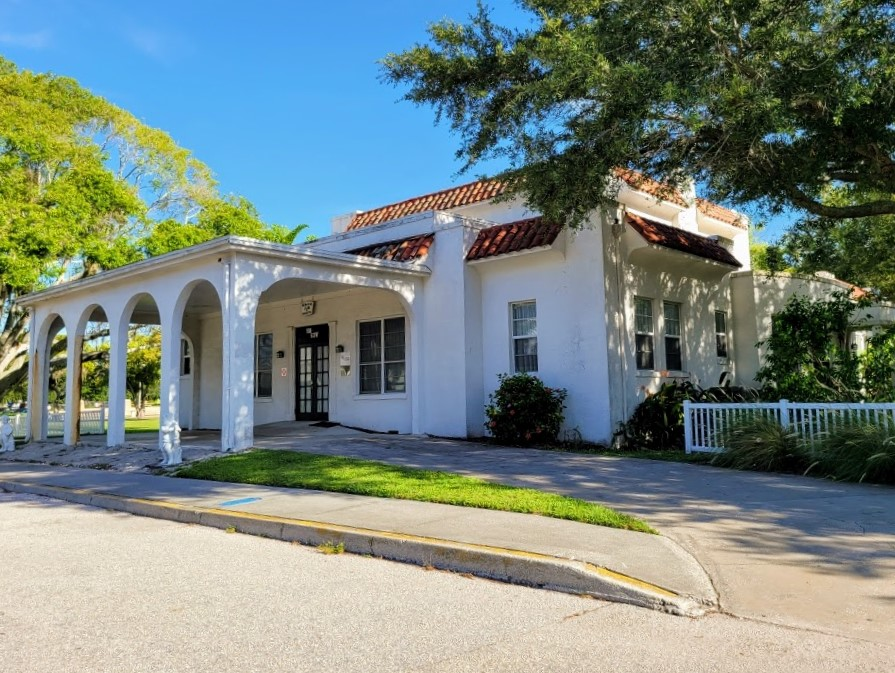
Palmetto Women's Club - Built 1930

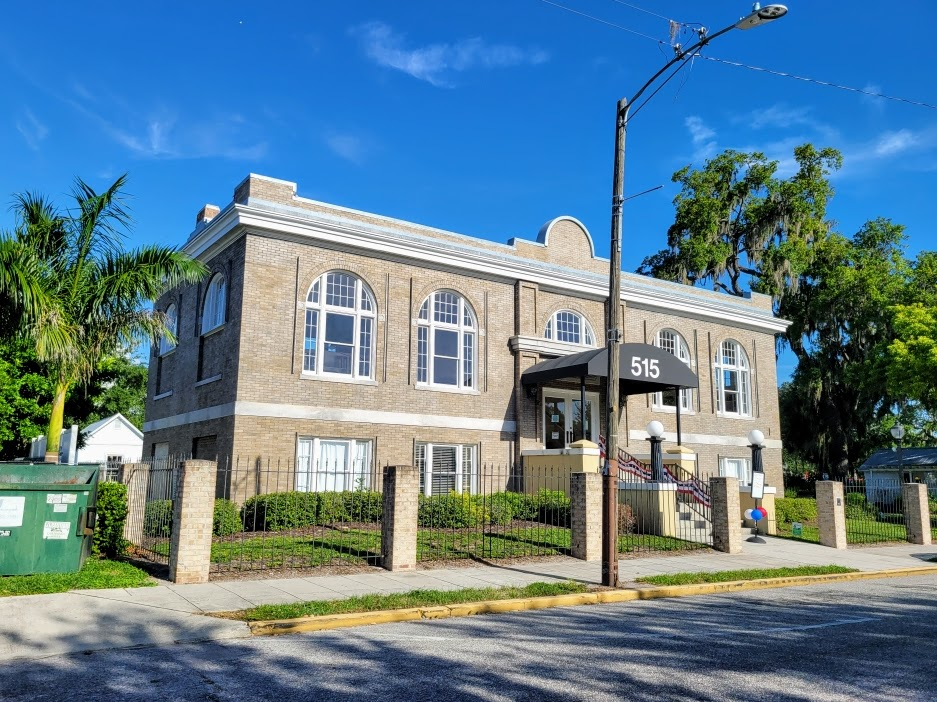
Carnegie Library - Built 1914
