= Egbert Reasoner House =

Historic house in Florida, United States

- U.S. National Register of Historic Places
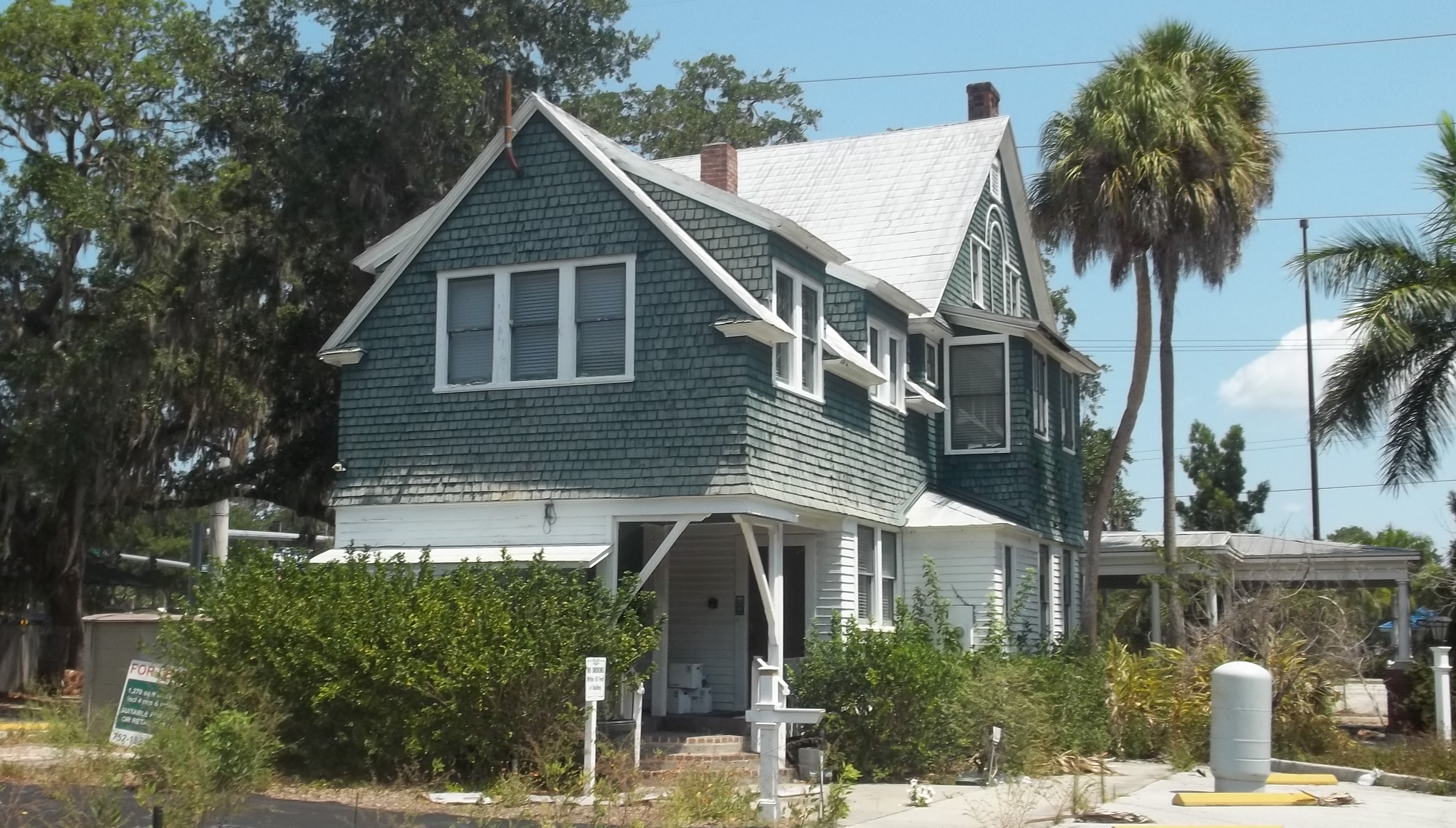
- Interactive map of Egbert Reasoner House
- Location: 3004 53rd Avenue East; Oneco, Florida
- Coordinates: 27°26′48″N 82°31′34″W
- Area: 3.8 acres (1.5 ha)
- Built: 1896
- Architect: Parke T. Burrows
- Architectural style: Shingle Style
- Demolished: June 30, 2015
- NRHP reference No.: 95000555
- Added to NRHP: May 4, 1995

The Egbert Reasoner House (also known as Beth Salem) was an historic house located at 3004 53rd Avenue, East in Oneco, Florida. It was built in 1896 for Egbert Reasoner, a horticulturalist who was inducted into the initial 1980 class of "Florida Agricultural Hall of Fame" members. Reasoner and his brother founded Royal Palm Nurseries. He is credited with introducing the pink grapefruit to Florida. The house was added to the National Register of Historic Places in 1995. Despite this, it was demolished in 2015.

== Efforts to conserve the house ==
In August 2013, the home was still in the Reasoner family, which hoped to have it relocated and saved when the underlying land was sold for commercial development. The home was scheduled to be demolished for construction of a RaceTrac gas station.

On June 30, 2015, the Reasoner house was demolished. After standing for 119 years, it was torn down in approximately one hour.
