= Richardson House (Bradenton, Florida) =

Historic house in Florida, United States

- U.S. National Register of Historic Places
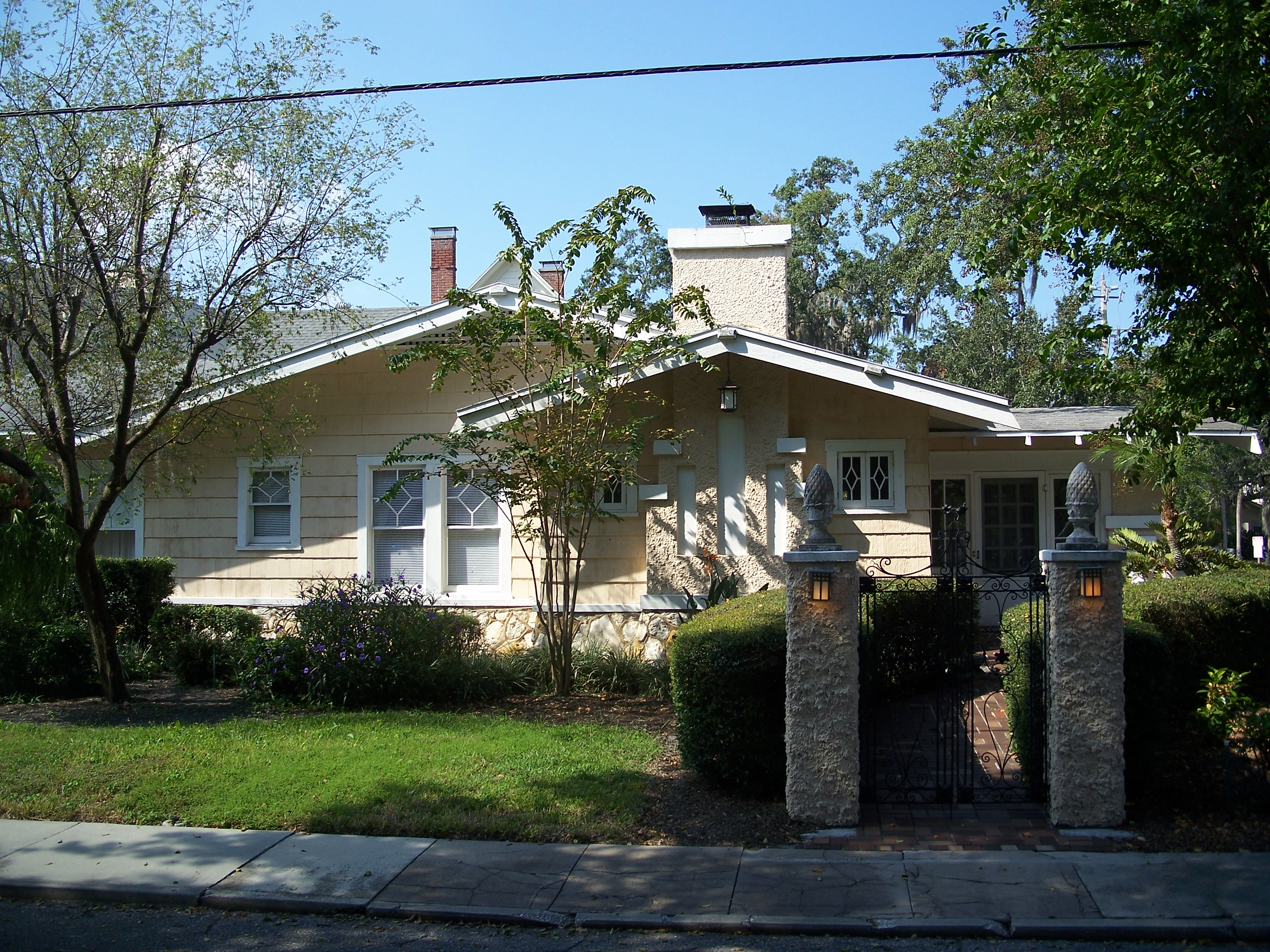

- Location within Manatee County
- Location: Bradenton, Florida
- Coordinates: 27°29′54″N 82°34′42″W
- Area: Less than 1 acre (0.40 ha)
- Built: 1924
- Architectural style: Bungalow/Craftsman
- NRHP reference No.: 02001676
- Added to NRHP: January 8, 2003

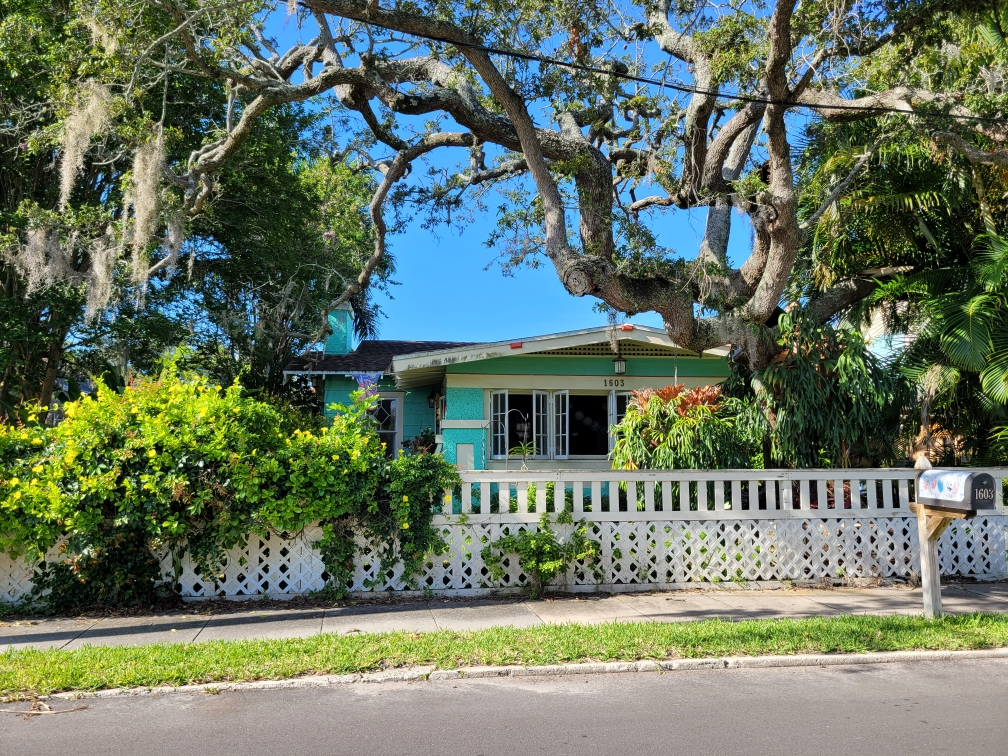
Repainted Richardson House North Elevation

The Richardson House is a historic house located at 1603 1st Avenue, West in the Point Pleasant neighborhood of Bradenton, Florida.

== Description and history ==
Built in 1924, it was the home of Bentham S. Richardson and his wife Harriet (Birney) Richardson. On January 8, 2003, it was added to the National Register of Historic Places.
