= Midway Subdivision Historic District =

Historic district in Florida, United States

- U.S. National Register of Historic Places
- U.S. Historic district
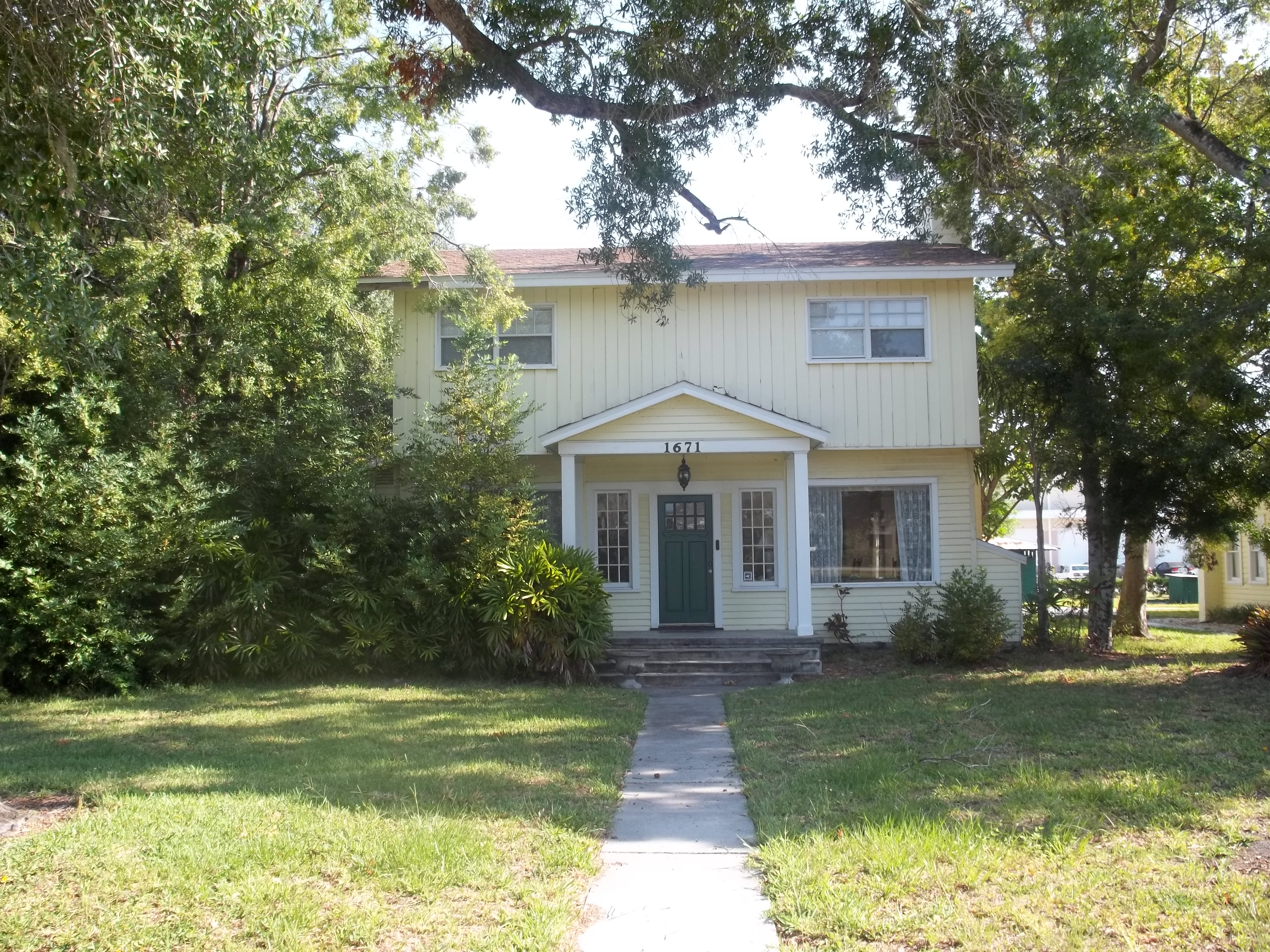

- Location within Florida Location within the United States
- Location: Sarasota, Florida
- Coordinates: 27°24′39″N 82°32′45″W
- Area: 30 acres (120,000 m^{2})
- NRHP reference No.: 98000587
- Added to NRHP: May 29, 1998

The Midway Subdivision Historic District, also known as Midway Groves, is a U.S. historic district (designated as such on May 29, 1998) located in Manatee County, Florida a short distance north of the Manatee-Sarasota county line. It has the post office address of 7201 15th Street East in Sarasota. It contains 4 historic buildings.
