= Paul M. Souder House =

Historic house in Florida, United States

- U.S. National Register of Historic Places
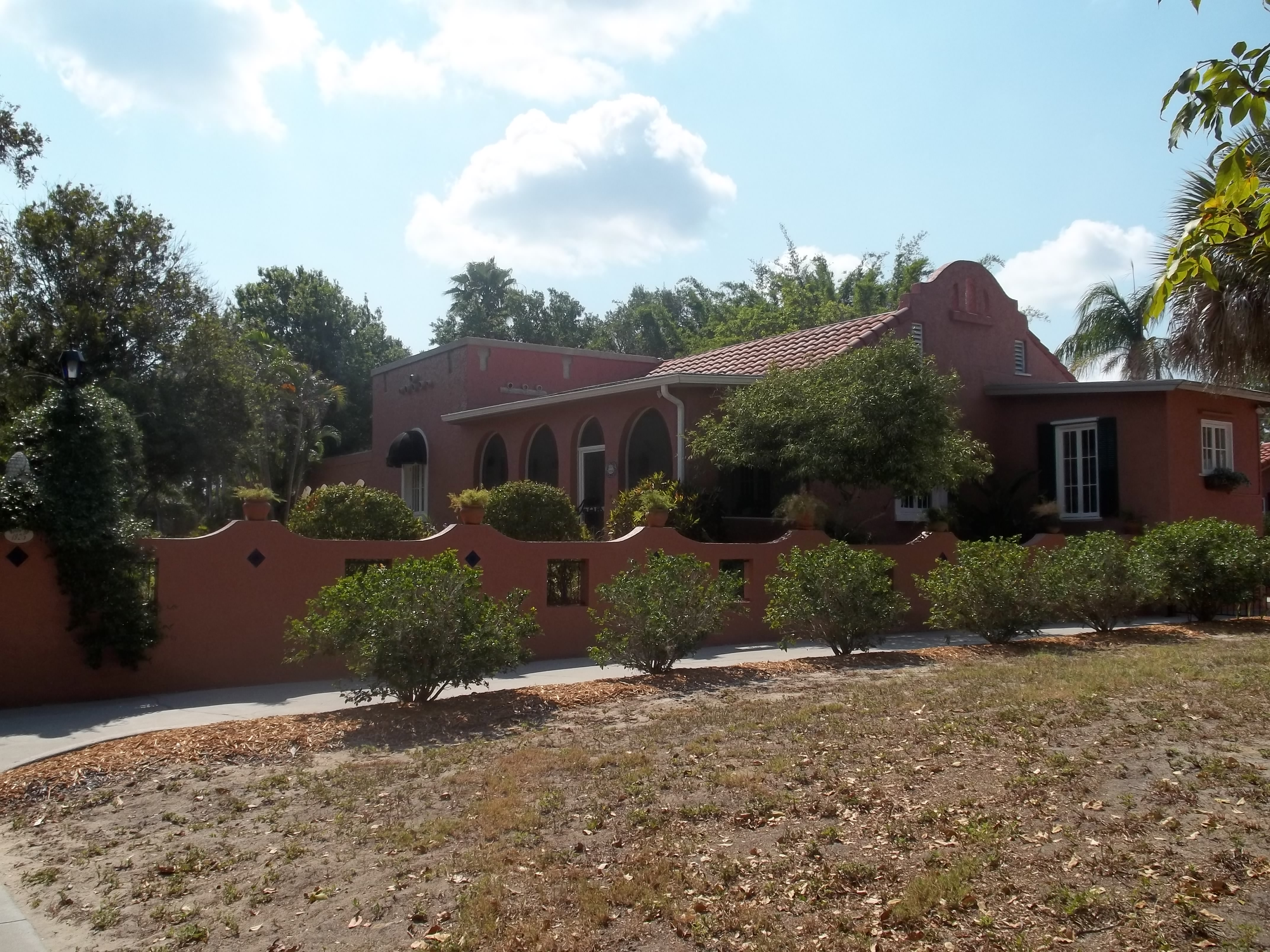

- Location within Florida Location within the United States
- Location: Sarasota, Florida
- Coordinates: 27°24′18″N 82°34′11″W
- NRHP reference No.: 00001282
- Added to NRHP: November 2, 2000

Paul M. Souder House is a national historic site located at 242 Greenwood Avenue, Sarasota, Florida in Manatee County.

It was added to the National Register of Historic Places on November 2, 2000.
