= Oneco, Florida =

- Unincorporated community
- Location within Manatee County, Florida
- Coordinates: 27°27′N 82°33′W
- Country: United States
- State: Florida
- County: Manatee

Oneco (/ˈoʊˈniːkoʊ/) is an unincorporated community in Manatee County, Florida, United States. It is a suburb of Bradenton, located just southeast of the city. The community is part of the North Port–Sarasota–Bradenton Metropolitan Statistical Area. In the 1920 Census it was enumerated as Precinct 6. The community reported as a census-designated place by the U.S. Census Bureau from 1960 to 1980.

== History ==
Historical population
Census	Pop.	Note	%±
1920	772		—
1960	1,530		—
1970	3,246		112.2%
1980	6,417		97.7%

A post office has been in operation at Oneco since 1889. The origin of the name Oneco is unclear but two possible stories exist. One story suggests it has Indian origins and based on Oneka, the eldest son of Uncas, a Mohegan Indian chief. The second story suggests the Reasoner Nursery was the only company in town. Residents acknowledged the town was a "one company" town and made a contraction of the term (one company) to give its current name.
