= Myakkahatchee Creek Archaeological Site =

Site in Sarasota County, Florida, US

- Interactive map of Myakkahatchee Creek; Archaeological Site
- 27°06′50″N 82°12′22″W
- Cultures: Manasota
- Location: North Port, Florida, USA
- Region: Southwest Florida

Site notes
- Discovered: 1982

The Myakkahatchee Creek Archaeological Site (8SO397) is located in North Port in Sarasota County, Florida, United States. The site was discovered during preparations for housing in 1982. Crews building Cold Springs Lane and Reiterstown Road unearthed artifacts and human remains. Archaeologists discovered a rare inland multi-period Manasota Indian village near the Myakkahatchee Creek, a major transportation route from the Gulf of Mexico inland. What makes the site so rare is that evidence of 10,000 years of occupation was excavated and very little is known about inland villages. The Manasota people remained permanently settled as fishing–hunter–gatherers between Tampa Bay and Charlotte Harbor on the Gulf Coast of Florida. Culturally, they were the northernmost of the Glades south Florida culture region. Archaeologists found a large midden, as well as a large U-shaped ritual earthwork with a burial mound. The creek is now part of North Ports Myakkahatchee Creek Environmental Park.

George Luer and colleagues commented after their salvage archaeology at the Myakkahatchee Creek site in 1987 that: "Archeological site destruction has been rampant and widespread in the Upper Charlotte/ Lower Myakkahatchee River area and is still ongoing. The remaining resources urgently need to be identified, inventoried, and studied before they too are lost." According to the state's master file, there are a total of 205 prehistoric sites in Charlotte County that have been presumed lost by 2018. Several hundred likewise have been lost in Sarasota County, with the exception of Historic Spanish Point, Warm Mineral Springs, and the Little Salt Spring Archaic Period sites.
