= Warm Mineral Springs Building Complex =

- U.S. National Register of Historic Places
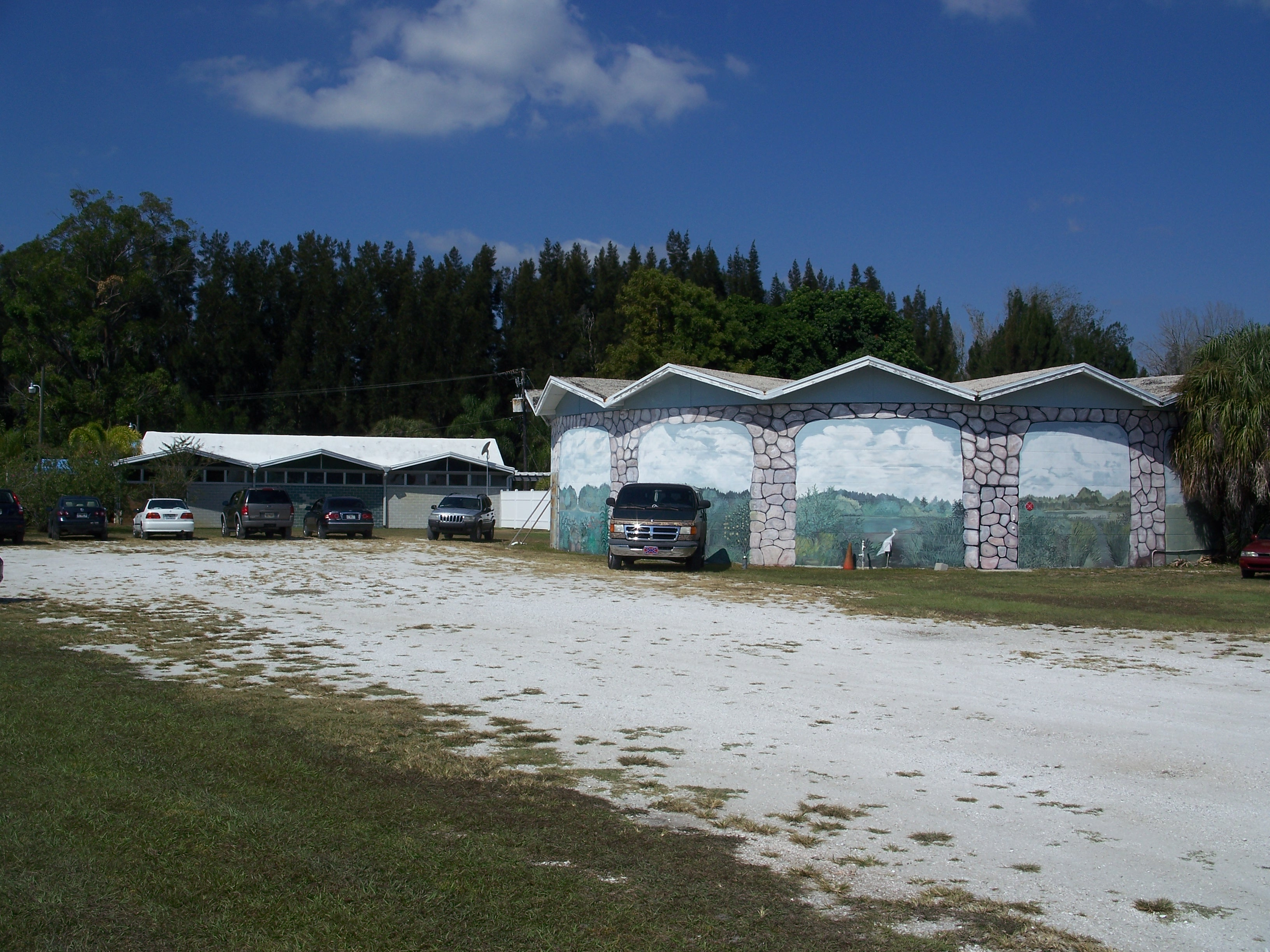
- Cyclorama with Spa building in background

- Location within Florida Location within the United States
- Location: Warm Mineral Springs, Florida
- Coordinates: 27°3′32″N 82°15′39″W
- Architect: Jack West
- Architectural style: Sarasota School of Architecture
- NRHP reference No.: 100004352
- Added to NRHP: August 30, 2019

The Warm Mineral Springs Building Complex consists of three historic buildings built in 1959 in the Warm Mineral Springs park in North Port, Florida. The buildings include a Park Spa Building, a sales building attached to the Spa Building, and a Cyclorama which contained an exhibit depicting Ponce de Leon's alleged discovery of the Fountain of Youth. The three buildings were added to the park facilities to house a Florida Quadricentennial celebration, which ran from December 14, 1959, to March 15, 1960. The Spa Building and the Cyclorama were designed by Jack West, a leader of the Sarasota School of Architecture. The buildings were added to the National Register of Historic Places in 2019.
