= William R. Royal =

American diver who discovered early human remains in Florida

- Born: William Robert Royal; March 16, 1905; Bay City, Michigan
- Died: May 8, 1997 (aged 92)
- Burial place: Warm Mineral Springs, Florida; 27°3′32″N 82°15′39″W
- Spouse: Shirley E. Royal
- Military career
- Allegiance: United States
- Branch: United States Air Force
- Rank: Lieutenant colonel
- Other work: Underwater diver and amateur archeologist

Lt. Col. William Robert Royal (March 16, 1905 – May 8, 1997) was an American scuba diver in the United States Air Force and amateur archeologist. In 1959, Royal and Eugenie Clark found archaeologically, pale-ontologically, and geologically significant artifacts and human bones from at least 30 individuals in Little Salt Spring and Warm Mineral Springs. A partially burned log found in association with some of the human bones was radiocarbon dated to about 10,000 years ago. If the bones were the same age as the log, then the bones were the oldest known evidence of human occupation in Florida at the time.

== Early years and war service ==
Royal was born in Bay City, Michigan, on March 16, 1905. He moved to Manatee County, Florida, during the Great Depression and operated a passenger airplane service in the Bahamas and Cuba in the late 1930s. He served in the United States Army Air Corps during World War II, during which he rode and killed sharks underwater in the Pacific Ocean. He retired from active duty with the rank of major in 1945. Between World War II and the Korean War, Royal lived in Detroit and Venice, Florida and worked as a building contractor. In 1951 Royal was recalled to active duty, serving until 1958 as a civil engineer at Air Force bases around the world. It was during this period that Royal took up recreational diving. Over the course of his career as an underwater diver, Royal dived in the Atlantic, Pacific and Indian Oceans and the Caribbean, Mediterranean and Black Seas. In 1958 Royal retired from active duty with the rank of lieutenant colonel. He returned to Venice, Florida, working as a builder.

== Amateur archeologist ==
In 1959 Royal began to investigate Little Salt Spring in North Port Charlotte, Florida. Royal discovered an underwater cave containing stalactites, which could only have formed when the cave was dry some 6000 years earlier. Royal and ichthyologist Eugenie Clark, found human and animal bones in the spring, suggesting that the cave was associated with human activity in prehistoric times. Royal and the other divers expanded their investigation to Warm Mineral Springs, where they found sedimentary layers of animal and human bones and plant matter, including a three-foot-long burned log embedded in clay.

Royal and Clark tried to interest Dr. John Mann Goggin in their discovery, but Goggin was skeptical of their theory that Warm Mineral Springs had been inhabited by humans 6000 years earlier than previously understood. At this time humans were not believed to have arrived in Florida until about 3500 years ago. Goggin was also unimpressed by Royal's lack of credentials to engage in archeology. Clark arranged for the Scripps Institute of Oceanography to carbon date a piece of the burned log, which was found to be 10,000 years old.

In summer 1959 the group's finds at Warm Mineral Springs were filmed for the Huntley-Brinkley Report on NBC television. On July 11, while the television cameras were rolling, Royal brought a human skull to the surface, in a manner which was planned beforehand. While brushing off the skull for the cameras, Royal accidentally discovered a human brain in a state of natural preservation inside the human skull, which quickly disintegrated after being uncovered. The unfortunate result was that the finds at Warm Mineral Springs were widely believed to be a hoax due to the unlikely coincidence of the brain being found during the television filming, especially by an untrained archaeologist. Seven years later, the skeleton from which the brain came was carbon-dated to between 7,140 and 7,580 years old.

For the next twelve years, Royal attempted to convince qualified archeologists to examine his finds by repeatedly diving in both Little Salt Spring and Warm Mineral Springs and bringing up artifacts and over 30 human remains. From 1960 to 1965 he worked as an Air Force contractor in Texas and New Mexico, retiring from the Air Force Reserve in 1965. In 1970 Royal moved back to Florida and began diving at Warm Mineral Springs seven days a week, searching for material that would convince scientists to investigate the site. In 1971, Carl J. Clausen, Florida's State Underwater Archeologist, spearheaded an investigation of Little Salt Spring. Clausen found that Warm Mineral Springs had been significantly disturbed by Royal, destroying much of the original context for archaeology. Still, Clausen's test excavation uncovered the human remains of a six year old child. The 1971-1972 exploration of Little Salt Spring, in which Sheck Exley participated, included a full-scale archeological excavation.

On March 18, 1972, Royal suffered decompression sickness after becoming trapped in the cave at the bottom of Warm Mineral Springs. Royal recovered after recompression treatment at the Naval Ordnance Laboratory in Fort Lauderdale, Florida, but suffered dysbaric osteonecrosis as a result of the accident, necessitating the placement of a platinum cap on the ball of his right femur.

In 1972 Wilburn Cockrell succeeded Clausen as Florida State Underwater Archeologist. After a diving excursion with a group which included Royal, Cockrell became more enthusiastic about the Warm Mineral Springs site despite the significant damage done by Royal's actions. Cockrell dived with Royal at Warm Mineral Springs, where Royal showed him a human jawbone he had found. Much of the credit for the finds at Warm Mineral Springs were attributed to Cockrell by the media at large due to his professional status. This, in addition to Cockrell preventing Royal from continuing to dive at Warm Mineral Springs, created bad blood between the two. In 1973 Cockrell began official excavations at Warm Mineral Springs, discovering many prehistoric artifacts, including human remains and a nearly complete human burial interred with a spear-thrower hook at the same location, which may be the oldest known intentional burial site in North America. The jawbone and the skull to which it belonged were carbon-dated to over 10,000 years old. These official excavations continued until the late 1990's, with a brief gap between 1977 and 1984 due to lack of funding.

== Later years ==
Despite controversy in the archaeology community, in 1974 Royal was honored by Dick Stone, the Secretary of State of Florida, for his contributions to scientific knowledge. At this time Royal built a home in Warm Mineral Springs, which centered a fireplace with artifacts and human remains he had collected built into the mortar. In later years Royal also investigated underwater midden deposits in the Gulf of Mexico west of Venice, Florida, and fossils and artifacts in Salt Creek, a drainage from Warm Mineral Springs to the Myakka River. He continued swimming daily into his 91st year. Royal died on May 8, 1997, at the age of 92. His ashes were placed in a tunnel at Warm Mineral Springs. He was survived by his wife, Shirley E. Royal, whom he married in 1970 and who died in 2001.

== Publications ==
- Royal, William R.; Burgess, Robert F. (1978). The Man Who Rode Sharks. Dodd, Mead. ISBN 0396075371.
