= Myakkahatchee Creek Environmental Park =

Park in North Port, Florida, US

- Myakka Park
- Location within Florida
- Location: North Port, Florida
- Coordinates: 27.118700°N 82.196050°W
- Area: 168 acres (68 ha)
- Established: 1989
- Etymology: Mikasuki: Myakka-hatchee (the river of the big water - Myakka River)
- Operator: Sarasota County

Myakkahatchee Creek Environmental Park is a 168-acre (68 ha) heavily wooded park in North Port, Florida, north of Interstate 75.

== History ==
In the 1970s and 1980s, new residential subdivisions were being built in North Port with development by General Development Corporation (GDC). In 1982, construction crews found unearthed artifacts and human remains while constructing roads. This led to the Myakkahatchee Creek Archaeological Site, located on the western part of the park.

The Myakkahatchee Creek Environmental Park was acquired in 1989 with two Florida Recreation Development Assistance Program (FRDAP) grants. The land was used as pastureland for cattle grazing before its acquisition.

The name Myakkahatchee comes from the Seminole language: "miarca" meaning "big water" and "hatchee" alluding to "river."

== Environment ==
The park includes the Myakkahatchee Creek and connection to the T. Mabry Carlton Reserve, basic camping areas, 3.7 miles (6.0 km) of trails available for hiking, bike riding, and horseback riding, a picnic area, a parking area, and restrooms. The park also offers birdwatching and fishing.

The ecology of the park includes hammock, South Florida pine flatwoods, marshes and wetlands with mixed upland areas. Wildlife in the park includes deer and alligators. The park floods almost every year.
