= WKDW =

WKDW could refer to:

- WKDW (AM), a radio station (900 AM) licensed to Staunton, Virginia, United States
- WWNP-LP, a radio station (97.5 FM) licensed to North Port, Florida, United States, which used the call sign WKDW-LP from 2016 to 2026
