= WWNP-LP =

- North Port, Florida; United States
- Broadcast area: North Port, Florida; Warm Mineral Springs, Florida
- Frequency: 97.5 MHz
- Branding: WKDW 97-5FM

Programming
- Format: Variety

Ownership
- Owner: Community Broadband Radio Association, Inc.

History
- First air date: April 26, 2016
- Former call signs: WKDW-LP (2016–2026)

Technical information
- Licensing authority: FCC
- Facility ID: 192040
- Class: L1
- ERP: 100 watts
- HAAT: 29.8 meters (98 ft)
- Transmitter coordinates: 27°2′38″N 82°14′10″W

Links
- Public license information: LMS
- Webcast: Listen live

WWNP-LP is a variety formatted broadcast radio station licensed to North Port, Florida, serving North Port and Warm Mineral Springs. WWNP-LP is owned and operated by Community Broadband Radio Association, Inc.
