= Warm Mineral Springs (spring) =

Archaeological site in Florida, United States

- U.S. National Register of Historic Places
- Warm Mineral Springs Park entrance

- Location within Florida Location within the United States
- Location: Warm Mineral Springs, Florida
- Coordinates: 27°3′32″N 82°15′39″W
- NRHP reference No.: 77000408
- Added to NRHP: November 28, 1977

The Warm Mineral Springs is a water-filled sinkhole located in North Port, Florida, a mile north of U.S. 41. The primary water supply is a spring vent deep beneath the pool's water surface. Warm Mineral Springs is the only warm water mineral spring in the State of Florida. It is an important geological and archaeological site containing Native American remnants. The site was operated as a spa from 1946 until 2000. It was added to the U.S. National Register of Historic Places on November 28, 1977. The springs re-opened for swimming only in 2014.

== Geology ==
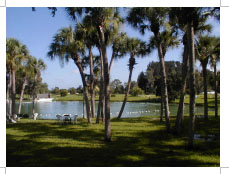
The sinkhole filled with water and surrounded by palm trees

Warm Mineral Springs is a sinkhole formed in carbonate rock by the collapse of the roof of a cavern 30,000 years ago. The land surrounding the sinkhole is flat, and about 3 metres (10 ft) above mean sea level. The circular opening of the sinkhole at the current water level is 72 metres (236 ft) across. The sinkhole is 70 metres (230 ft) deep, and is shaped roughly like an hourglass. The opening narrows to 48 metres (157 ft) across a few meters below the surface of the water. About 13 metres (43 ft) below the surface the opening widens for a short space, forming a ledge under an overhang. The opening narrows to 38 metres (125 ft) across at 30 metres (98 ft) below the surface, and then opens up again, reaching 72 metres (236 ft) across at the bottom of the sinkhole. Debris from the collapsed roof and sides of the sink, and other material that has fallen into the sink, forms a large cone at the bottom, rising to 38 metres (125 ft) below the surface of the water.

The environment in Florida during the Pleistocene period was much different than today. Due to the enormous amount of water frozen in ice sheets during the last glacial period, the sea level was at least 100 metres (330 ft) lower than it is today. Florida had about twice the land area of today, its water table was much lower, and its climate was cooler and much drier. There were few running rivers or springs in the part of Florida that is now above sea level. The few water sources in the interior of Florida were rain-fed lakes and water holes perched on relatively impervious deposits of marl and deep sinkholes partially filled by springs, such as Warm Mineral Springs. The water level in the sinkhole 12,000 years ago was about 30 metres (98 ft) lower than it is today. Dripstone (stalactites and stalagmites) has formed on the walls of Warm Mineral Springs down to about 30 metres (98 ft) below the present level of the water, indicating that the water level in the sinkhole was at least low long enough for the dripstone to form.

Although there are many small freshwater springs in the walls of the sinkhole, the primary source is a vent 63 metres (207 ft) below the surface of the water which discharges an estimated 20,000,000 U.S. gallons (76,000,000 L) a day of warm [30 °C (86 °F)] mineralized water. The water has a high content of dissolved chloride (1,600 to 1,700 milligrams per liter [mg/L]) and hydrogen sulfide (9,200 to 9,600 mg/L), and essentially no dissolved oxygen. The source of the water is uncertain. The water enters the sinkhole at the 63 metres (207 ft) level from a conduit that extends with several turns to a point 53 metres (174 ft) from the entrance and 67 metres (220 ft) below the surface of the water. The conduit has an elliptical shape, about 1 metre (3.3 ft) high by 3 metres (9.8 ft) wide, for much of its length. At the far end the conduit opens up into two small caverns. Most of the flow appears to enter through the floor of the last cavern. Between 5,000,000 U.S. gallons (19,000,000 L) and 7,000,000 U.S. gallons (26,000,000 L) a day overflows from the sinkhole.

== History ==
The area surrounding the spring was developed as a spa in 1946, including the construction of a bathhouse. The property was sold in 1955 and the new owners began a housing development, platting 3,000 housing lots on the property. The Warm Mineral Springs Motel was opened at the entrance to the spring in 1958. In 1959, a Park Spa Building and Cyclorama (depicting Ponce de Leon's alleged discovery of the Fountain of Youth) were built at the spring to house a Florida Quadricentennial celebration, which ran from December 14, 1959, to March 15, 1960. The Spa Building and the Cyclorama were designed by Jack West, a leader of the Sarasota School of Architecture. The Spa Building, the Cyclorama, and a sales building attached to the Spa, were added to the National List of Historic Places in 2019 as the Warm Mineral Springs Building Complex.

In the late 1950s, William Royal and other scuba divers found artifacts and human bones from at least seven individuals in Warm Mineral Springs. A partially burned log found in association with some of the human bones was radiocarbon dated to about 10,000 years ago. If the bones were the same age as the log, then the bones were the oldest known evidence of human occupation in Florida at the time. Bone artifacts recovered in association with the human bones were described as of "Archaic period in the Americas-type." Apparently, the bones and artifacts were deposited above the water level in the sinkhole at that time.

One skull recovered from under sediment about 40 feet (12 m) under the present water level in the sinkhole contained organic matter. Hospital medical staff who examined the contents of the skull observed that it looked like a brain. One doctor reported that he could distinguish the cerebellum from pieces of the cerebrum. A section through the material also appeared to show grey and white matter. Tests were consistent with the material being brain matter, but no cellular structure could be observed.

Unrestricted access to the spring resulted in scuba divers removing human bones and artifacts and stalactites and stalagmites as souvenirs and for sale. Almost all artifacts had been removed from the sinkhole before scientific exploration began. The property owners started restricting access to the sinkhole and trying to prevent looting and vandalism in the 1970s.

Agencies that care for public property are required to inventory archaeological resources and to ensure their protection and preservation in the long term. They employ archeologists, part of whose job it is to catalog and curate artifacts found on that property. Landowners and those having permission to collect from the landowners are less constrained but not entirely free to do whatever they wish. Unmarked graves are protected by law and it is illegal to disturb them except under certain terms of various federal, state and local laws.

Wilburn Cockrell, an archaeologist at Florida State University, started working at Warm Mineral Springs in 1972. This work led to the private owner's protecting the site due to its archaeological significance. Archaeological exploration of the sinkhole paused in 1975, resuming in 1984. Phase II of the project found evidence of tool making by early humans. There is evidence of the Paleo-Indian and Archaic cultures.

Wilburn Cockrell has described Warm Mineral Springs as the "burial ground" for the prehistoric residential community at nearby Little Salt Spring. In a 1988 interview, Cockrell stated that the remains of more than 20 Paleoindians have been found in the sinkhole, including some radiocarbon dated to 12,000 years ago. The archaeologists also found bones of several Pleistocene animals, including a giant ground sloth, a saber-toothed cat, a horse, and a camelid. Cockrell found an 11,000-year-old human skeleton in a fetal position, apparently placed in a crevice with broken stalactites holding it in place. This may be the oldest known intentional burial in North America.

In 1996-1997, a group of diver explorers conducted an underwater survey of the site resulting in the mapping of two warm water vents ~97 degrees F and two cool water vents ~76 degrees F. The group also videotaped the site including the source of the deepest warm water vent at the end of a 150 ft. lone cave.

Warm Mineral Springs was purchased on December 20, 2010, by Sarasota County and the city of North Port for $5.5 million.

== Architecture ==
The Cyclorama at Warm Mineral Springs

The buildings serving the springs have been attributed to Sarasota School of Architecture architect Jack West and were constructed sometime in the late 1950s. The entry building contains a gift shop, locker rooms, showers, and a restaurant.

A separate circular structure dubbed the "Cyclorama" contains a 226 x 13 ft 360-degree mural, with some 3-D figures, depicting nine scenes of Ponce de Leon's arrival in Florida in 1513 and his search for a fountain of youth, since Warm Mineral Springs is thought to have been that particular fountain. The Cyclorama was created as part of the 1959 commemorations for the 400th anniversary of Tristan de Luna's settlement of Pensacola, the first in "La Florida." The large mural was painted by local Sarasota artist Don Putman and originally, was accompanied by a 22-minute narration by Lowell Thomas. The Cyclorama has been closed since the 1970s and its fate is unknown although restoration efforts of the park facilities are underway following the devastation of Hurricane Ian.
