= Chapel of the Upper Room =

Demolished chapel in Florida

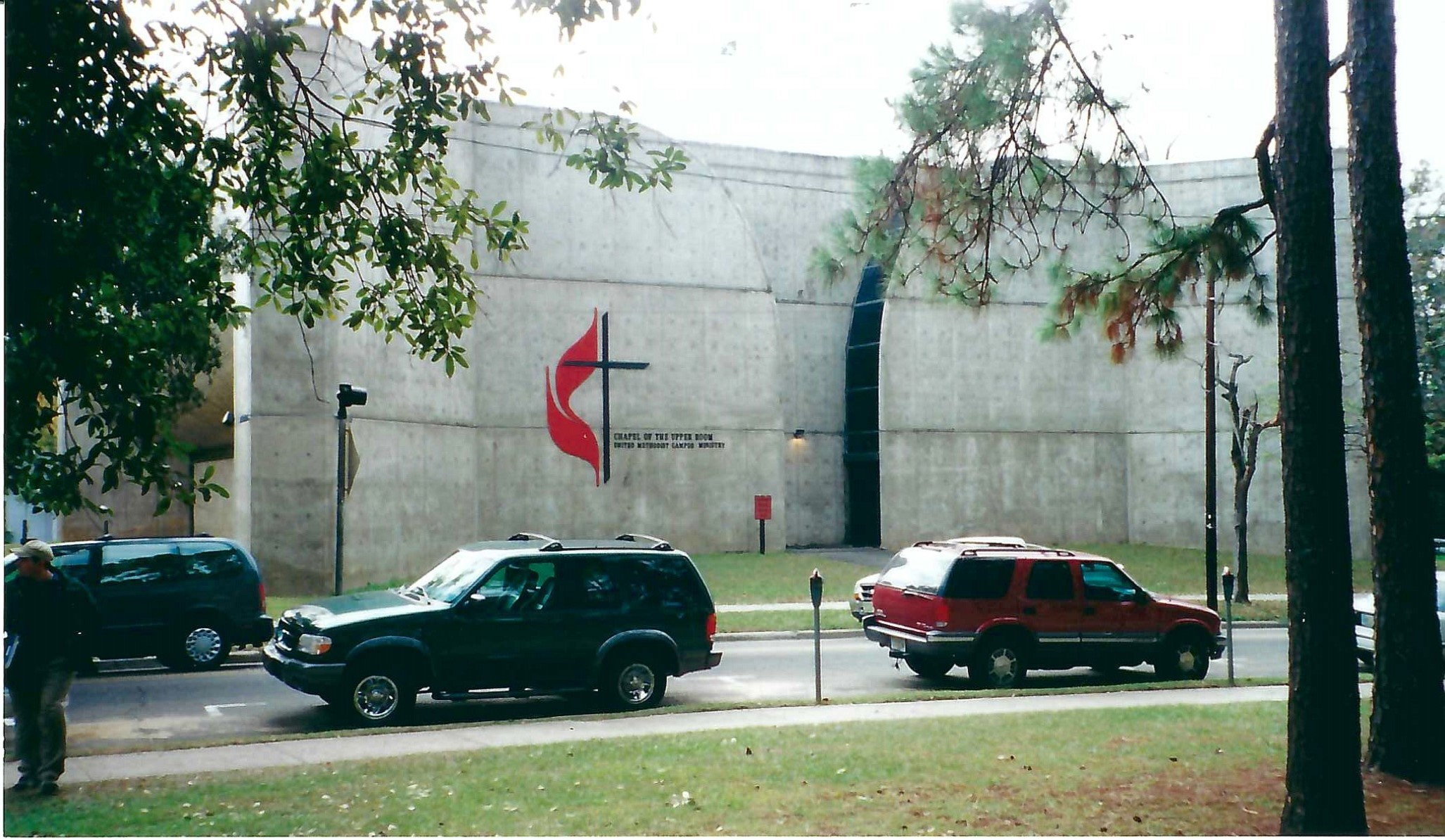
Front exterior of the Chapel of the Upper Room.

The Chapel of the Upper Room was located in Tallahassee Florida, on the campus of Florida State University. It was the main sanctuary of the United Methodist Wesley Foundation campus ministry from 1974 to 2015. The building was designed by renowned architect Victor Lundy, in what has come to be known as the Brutalist style of mid-twentieth century architecture. The building was demolished in 2015 to make way for a new building for the Florida State Wesley Foundation.

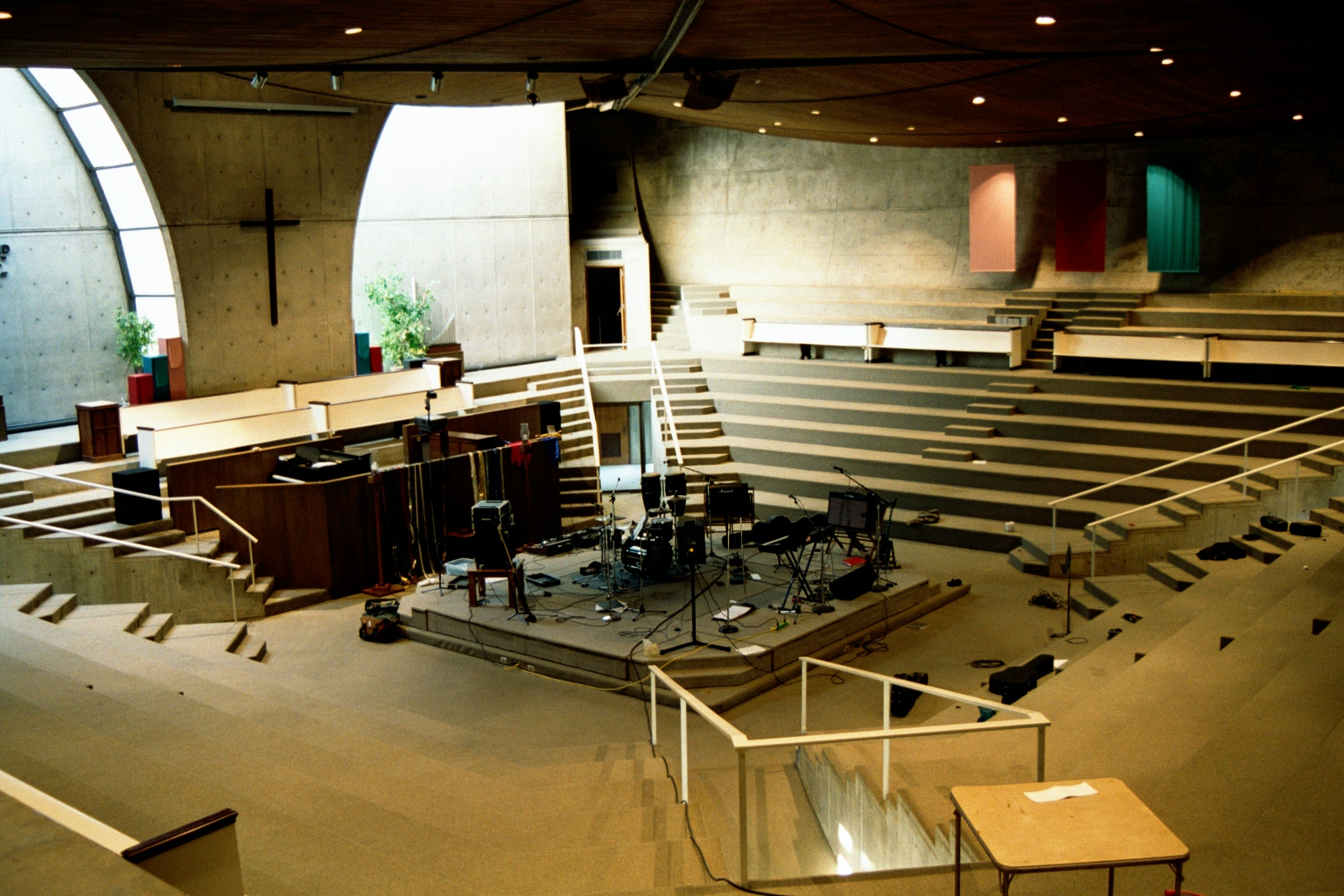
Interior of the Chapel of the Upper Room (1999).

== History ==
In the early 1960s, Florida State University began to expand, and with it, its number of Methodist students. A brick Methodist student center had been built on Jefferson Street in the early 1950s. This building included a chapel for Sunday services. By the mid-sixties, two large doors were installed into a wall that adjoined the student lounge and the chapel to allow for overflow seating. Overcrowding at the Methodist services continued and students soon were forced to find seating on the sidewalks around the building. Money was eventually secured from the Florida Annual Conference of the United Methodist Church to build a new student sanctuary on the campus of Florida State.

The director of the Wesley Foundation at the time, Rev. Austin Hollady, and others wanted a unique building that spoke to the culture of the 1960s. To this end, they hired Architect Victor Lundy to design the new space. Lundy had already designed several well-known buildings such as the American Embassy in Sri Lanka and would go on to design the United States Tax Court building in Washington DC. Lundy also had designed quite a few unique church buildings by this time. Victor Lundy came to the Campus of Florida State in March 1965 to see the site for himself and to present a lecture on “Theology and Architecture.” Designs were made, and a groundbreaking occurred around February 1969. The initial hope was that the building would be completed by the end of 1970, but the dedication of the building did not occur until February 3, 1974.

Over the years, the building housed worship services, plays, concerts, and prayer gatherings.

== Maundy Thursday ==
Well before the Chapel of the Upper Room was built, the FSU Wesley Foundation celebrated Maundy Thursday, the Thursday before Easter, in a unique and dramatic way. Students would be ushered into a room in silence where they would find a table with thirteen chairs. This table was set up to appear as if the disciples of Jesus had just left after a celebration of the Passover. Food would still be on the plates and candles would still be burning on the table. When ready, students would take their place at the table and receive communion elements in the seat of one of the disciples. This is the tradition that gave the Chapel of the Upper Room its name and inspired its design. The Maundy Thursday service was moved to the chapel in April 1974. This tradition continued in the Chapel of the Upper Room well into the early 2000s and beyond.

== Design ==
Victor Lundy was trained in both the Beaux-Arts and Bauhaus schools of architecture. With its grandeur and sparse simplicity, both of these influences are evident in the Chapel of the Upper Room.

=== Exterior ===
The exterior was constructed almost completely of grey, poured concrete. The side and back walls curved inward, halfway down the face, creating the appearance of a large immovable chalice. The front featured an entryway that was set back several feet from the rest of the front elevation. Each side of the two storied recessed areas swooped downward. These curved features were filled with treated glass that allowed light to stream into the front area of the sanctuary and created a chalice shape that suggested the movent associated with pouring.

=== Interior ===
The interior of the building was mostly made up of a large open sanctuary, 105 feet square and 25 feet high. It was designed to originally seat 750 people. Ascending levels provided seating on three sides and allowed everyone in the space to have a clear view of the altar area and each other. The stadium-like seating area was originally designed to hold modern, wooden pews, but this addition to the space never became a reality. Worshipers would normally sit on the grey-carpeted levels, which created a more informal atmosphere. The front of the room included an elevated level that created space for a piano, organ, choir and a centralized podium, even though speakers normally preached or presented from the floor level.

The ceiling of this great open space was created with wood tongue and groove decking supported by a metal cable system. This swooping ceiling gave the impression of a canopy or a loaf of bread. Recessed lights dotted the ceiling and, in its original design, drew attention first to the altar area in the center of the room and then to congregation surrounding it.

The center of the room normally housed of a modern-style, square altar table. The altar platform where the table sat was usually surrounded by metal rails where congregants could receive communion or pray. The railings in this area could also be taken down and custom-made stage pieces could be inserted to create a large, elevated stage in the middle of the room.

The sanctuary of the chapel was accessed by doors at the four corners of the room. As individuals would enter the space, they would start in a foyer area with very low ceilings and move toward a ramp. This ramp would ascend upward into the "Upper Room." The movement from low foyer to wide-open sanctuary created a scene of openness and awe as worshipers entered.

A hallway ran around the outside, lower level of the chapel. This hallway took guests to bathrooms on the south side of the building, an office, sacristy, and meeting room on the east, and storage rooms on the west. This hallway also connected to a lobby near the front entrance.

== Demolition ==
For many years, the Chapel of the Upper Room suffered from significant maintenance issues. The poured concrete walls developed cracks over time. These cracks allowed water to seep through the walls of the building during rainy days. The unique suspended ceiling was also prone to leaks. It was eventually determined by denominational leaders that the repairs and updates needed for both the Chapel of the Upper Room and the 1950s Student Center were too costly, and both buildings would need to be torn down. In September 2015, the Wesley Foundation hosted a goodbye celebration for the building. Over 400 people were in attendance. Demolition began on December 23, 2015, and was scheduled to take 30 days to complete.
