= Little Salt Spring =

Lake in the United States of America

- U.S. National Register of Historic Places
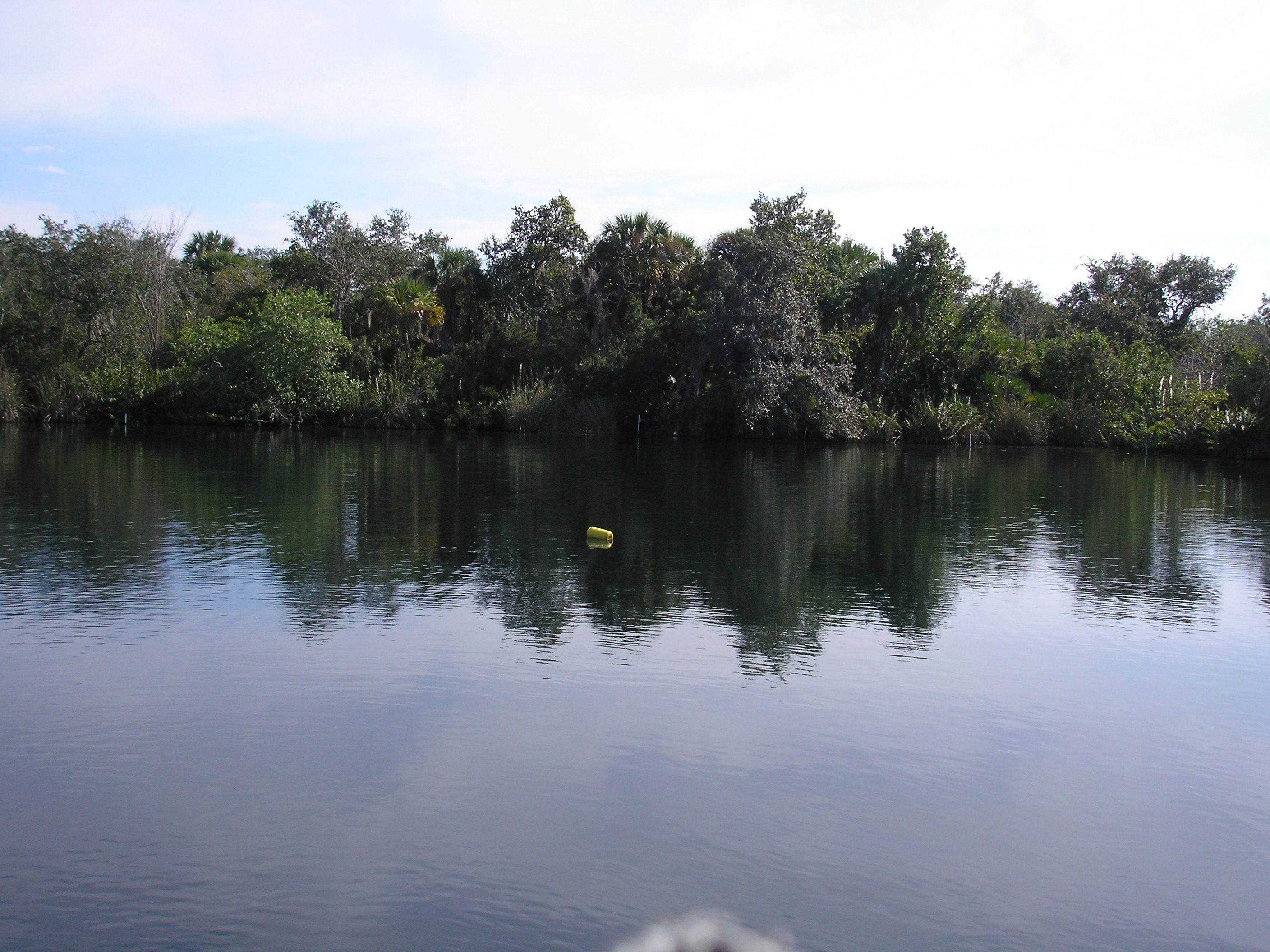
- Little Salt Spring in November 2006

- Location within Florida Location within the United States
- Location: North Port, Florida, U.S.
- Coordinates: 27°4′29″N 82°14′0″W
- NRHP reference No.: 79000692
- Added to NRHP: July 10, 1979

Little Salt Spring is an archaeological and paleontological site in North Port, Florida. The site has been owned by the University of Miami since 1980 with research performed there by the university's Rosenstiel School of Marine, Atmospheric, and Earth Science.

== Site ==
Little Salt Spring is a freshwater sinkhole in North Port, Florida, formed within the karst limestone that underlies much of the Florida Peninsula. It is classified as a third magnitude spring and consists of a surface pond approximately 12.2 metres (40 ft) deep above a vertical shaft that descends to a maximum depth of approximately 75 metres (246 ft). Beneath the surface, the shaft widens into an inverted cone with ledges at depths of approximately 16 metres (52 ft) and 27 metres (89 ft).

Numerous deep vents at the bottom of the sinkhole discharge oxygen-poor groundwater into the basin. Below a depth of about 5 metres (16 ft), the water contains very little oxygen, slowing the natural decay of organic materials. These conditions have preserved wood, plant remains, human remains, animal bones, artifacts, and other archaeological evidence for thousands of years.

During the Late Pleistocene, approximately 12,000 to 13,000 years ago, sea level was about 100 metres (328 ft) lower than it is today. The lower water table reduced the water level within Little Salt Spring by approximately 27 metres (89 ft), leaving much of the sinkhole dry. As sea levels rose during the Holocene, the spring gradually filled. The basin surrounding the spring and the adjacent slough accumulated thick deposits of peat, creating conditions that preserved evidence of human activity from the Paleoindian and Archaic periods.

On July 10, 1979, the site was added to the National Register of Historic Places. In 2013, the University of Miami began considering selling the site to Sarasota County Government, due to funding being cut towards maintaining the site and its facilities. The University of Miami retains ownership.

== Discovery ==
Little Salt Spring attracted little scientific attention until the late 1950s. Although divers had reported human bones in the spring by the early 1950s, systematic exploration began in 1958 when scuba diver William R. Royal and marine biologist Eugenie Clark carried out numerous SCUBA dives in both Little Salt Spring and nearby Warm Mineral Springs. Their discoveries of human remains, archaeological materials, and fossil animal bones demonstrated the archaeological potential of the springs and brought Little Salt Spring to the attention of the scientific community.

Between 1971 and 1980, archaeologist Carl J. Clausen directed systematic investigations of Little Salt Spring on behalf of the General Development Corporation. Research extended beyond the spring basin to include the adjacent slough and a nearby midden, documenting archaeological deposits associated with both the Paleoindian and Archaic periods. These investigations established the framework for subsequent archaeological and bioarchaeological research at the site.

== Ancient human use ==
Hundreds of burials dating from 5,200 to 6,800 years ago have been found in the slough. As has happened in other wetland burials in Florida, such as at the Windover Archaeological Site, brain matter survived in many of the skulls. In the 1970s the overturned shell of an extinct giant land tortoise was found on the 27-meter (89 ft) ledge. A wooden stake had been driven between the carapace and the plastron, and there is evidence of a fire under the tortoise. It appears that the tortoise had been cooked in its shell. The radiocarbon date for the wooden stake was 12,030 years ago; a bone from the tortoise was dated to 13,450 years ago. Large numbers of human bones have been recovered from the spring, but were not collected under controlled conditions.

== See also ==
- List of sinkholes of the United States
