= Robert Forrest Burgess =

American writer (born 1927)

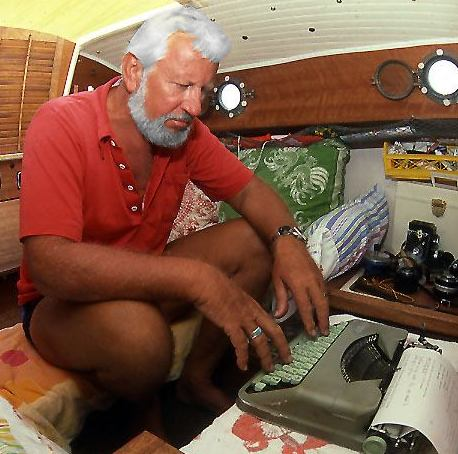
Robert Forrest Burgess

Robert Forrest Burgess (born November 30, 1927) is an American author of non-fiction adventure books, as well as sport fishing and scuba diving magazine articles. His photographs illustrate his material.

== Life ==
Robert F. Burgess was born in Grand Rapids, Michigan, on November 30, 1927. He built his first diving gear out of a World War II gas mask, 50 feet of air hose, and an air compressor to explore a Michigan shipwreck in 1944. At the end of World War II, he served as a ski trooper with the 88th Infantry Division named the Blue Devils by the Germans, and took his GI Bill abroad, studying French first at the Berlitz Language School in Trieste, Italy, and later at the University of Neuchâtel in Switzerland.

During this time he skied the Alps as part of the university's athletic program. Returning to Trieste to sell his German Amphibious Jeep, he and a companion purchased an Italian Lambretta motor scooter and rode it back to Switzerland, crossing the Great St. Gothard Pass and two other major mountain ranges at night. For their summer vacation he and a companion moved to Italy's Island of Capri for three months where they learned to skin dive.

After studying abroad he returned to the U.S. to complete his education, majoring in journalism at Michigan State University. Then, moving to Florida he wrote and photographed features for every major U.S. outdoor magazine including several abroad.

With his new bride, Burgess returned to Switzerland in 1956. In Milan they purchased an Italian Lambretta motor scooter that winter, riding it 700 miles, across the Rivieras to Spain, where they took a ferry to the Balearic Islands. They wintered on the island of Mallorca, where he fished with Mallorcan trawler fishermen, gathering material for a novel. That spring they ferried to Valencia and motor scootered across Spain to Madrid, where he and his wife lived for the next 3 1/2 years. While there Burgess wrote his first novel and numerous travel articles for periodicals in England, Spain and America.

During that time, on assignment for "Argosy" Magazine, he and a companion crossed the Mediterranean aboard a freighter with the French Foreign Legion, then back-packed through Tunisia to find and climb Hill 609, a fortified German mountain fortress during World War II.

Returning later to the U.S., he served as editor for the "Florida Outdoors Magazine" wrote free-lance features for sport diving and sport fishing magazines throughout the country, and for the last 20 years has contributed articles on these subjects as Editor-At-Large for the "Florida Sportsman Magazine".

Over the years Burgess has written and published over twenty books on such subjects as sharks, shipwrecks, underwater archaeology, treasure diving, cave diving, travel, and Ernest Hemingway (whom he met in Pamplona during that author's last Pamplona fiesta).

In January 1994, Scuba Schools International awarded Robert Burgess their most prestigious award, given only to divers with verified log books who have met or exceeded all their requirements, including at least 5,000 dives, to achieve the elite SSI rating of Platinum Pro 5000 Diver.

Robert F. Burgess lives in north Florida, where he continues to write magazine articles and books.

== Fiction ==
- The Mystery of Mound Key - 1966
- A Time For Tigers - 1968
- Where Condors Fly - 1968

== Non-fiction ==
- The International Diners Phrase Book - 1965
- Sinkings, Salvages And Shipwrecks - 1970
- The Sharks - 1970
- Exploring A Coral Reef - 1972
- Ships Beneath The Sea - 1975
- The Cave Divers - 1976 (revised 1999)
- Gold, Galleons And Archaeology: The History Of The 1715 Spanish Plate Fleet And The True Story Of The Great Florida Treasure Find (with Carl Clausen) - 1976
- They Found Treasure - 1977
- The Man Who Rode Sharks (coauthored with William R. Royal) - 1978
- Man: 12,000 Years Under The Sea, A Story Of Underwater Archaeology - 1980
- Secret Languages Of The Sea - 1981
- Florida's Golden Galleons : The Search For The 1715 Spanish Treasure Fleet - 1982
- Handbook Of Trailer Sailing - 1984
- Sunken Treasure: Six Who Found Fortunes - 1988
- Diving Off The Beaten Track - 1995
- Hemingway's Paris And Pamplona, Then And Now (A Memoir) - 2001
- Moving To Majorca - 2001

== Maps ==
- Snorkelers' And Divers' Guide To Old Shipwrecks Of Florida's Southeast Coast
