= Victor A. Lundy =

American architect (1923–2024)

Victor Lundy
- Born: February 1, 1923; New York City, U.S.
- Died: November 4, 2024 (aged 101); Bellaire, Texas, U.S.
- Occupation: Architect
- Awards: Progressive Architecture Award citation for recreation (1956); AIA Award of Merit (1958, 1959, 1960, 1966)
- Buildings: Warm Mineral Springs Motel; United States Tax Court Building; Austin Centre; One Eleven Congress
- Design: Sarasota School of Architecture

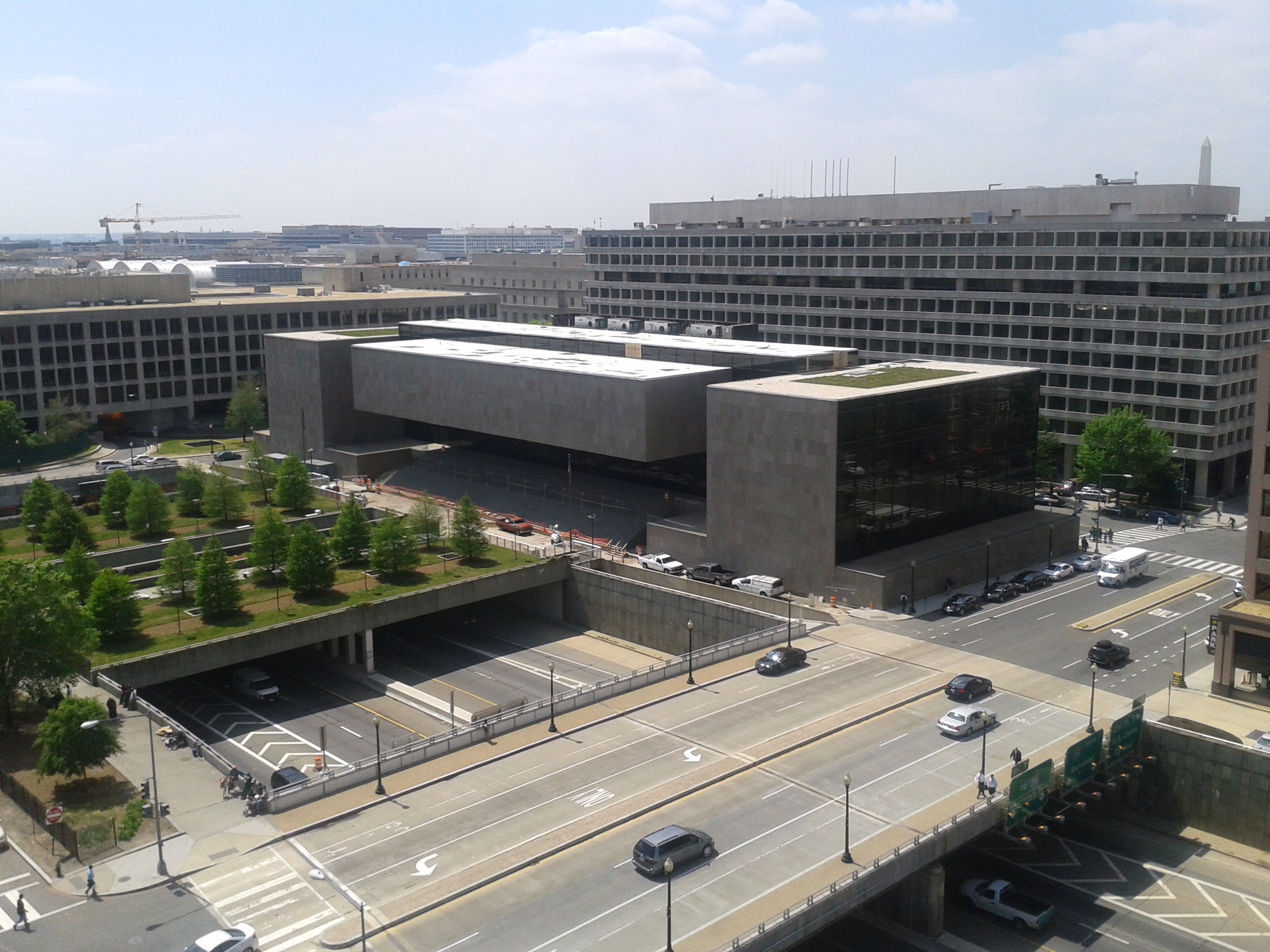
The United States Tax Court Building in Washington, D.C.

Victor Alfred Lundy (February 1, 1923 – November 4, 2024) was an American architect. An exemplar of modernist architecture, he was one of the leaders of the Sarasota School of Architecture. His Warm Mineral Springs Motel, outside Warm Mineral Springs, Florida, is listed in the National Register of Historic Places.

Lundy was born in New York City on February 1, 1923. He first studied at the NYU School of Architecture and Applied Arts. There he was influenced by the school's Beaux-Arts program. After the 1941 attack on Pearl Harbor, he joined the air force and was then assigned to the Army Specialized Training program. Lundy was wounded in combat yet remained on active duty until October 1945. Once released from military service, he continued his education at Harvard where he studied under masters in the Bauhaus style of Architecture.

He was honored by the Smithsonian on his 90th birthday in 2013. A film on his life and work, entitled "Victor Lundy: Sculptor of Space" was premiered by the GSA on February 25, 2014.

Lundy turned 100 in February 2023, and died on November 4, 2024, at the age of 101.

== Work ==
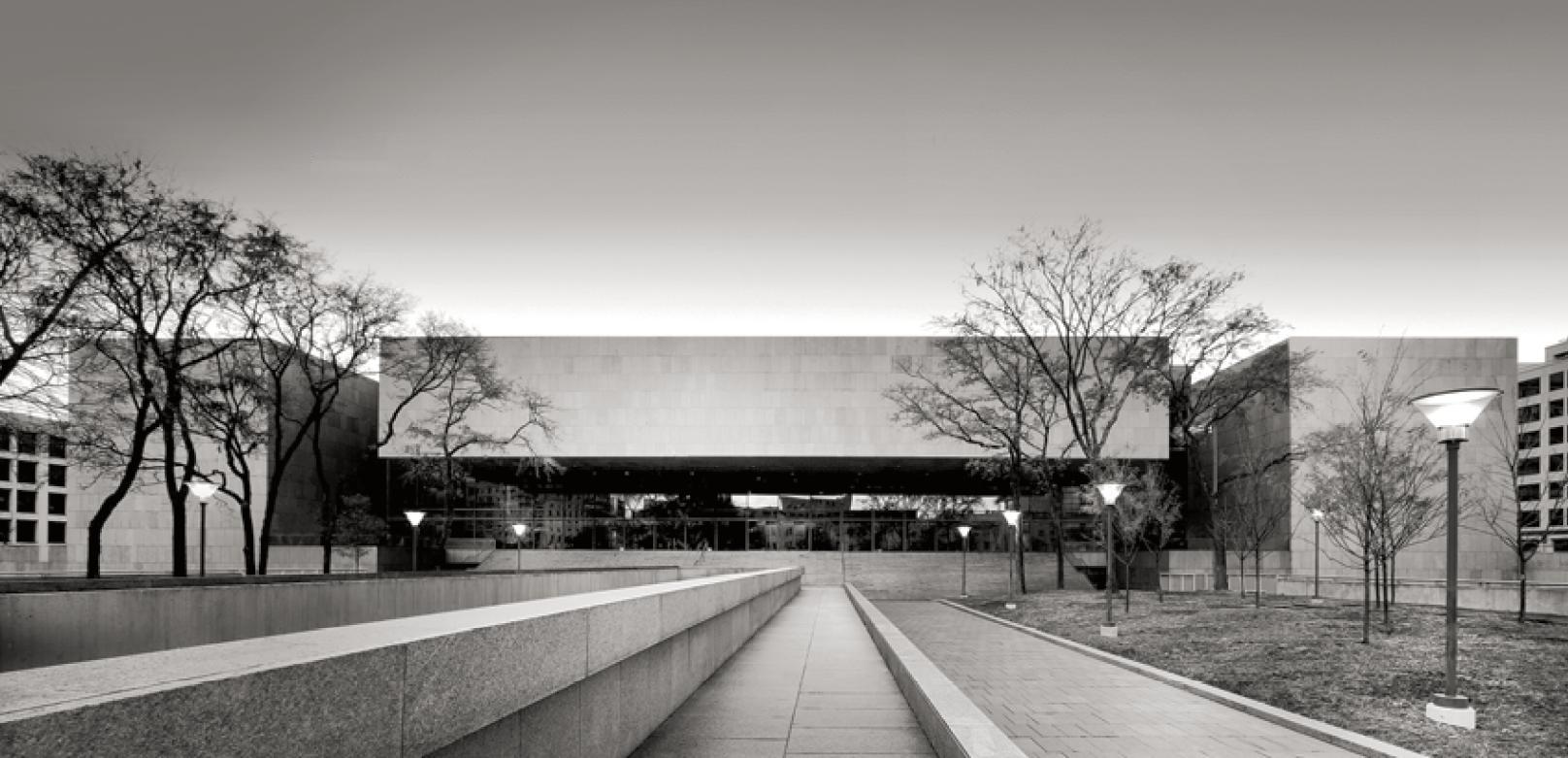
Frontal view of the United States Tax Court Building which Lundy designed in collaboration with the architectural firm Lyles, Bissett, Carlisle, and Wolff (LBC&W)

- Drive-In Church, Venice, FL (1954). Demolished.
- Greater Sarasota Chamber of Commerce (Pagoda Building), Sarasota, FL (1956)
- South Gate Community Center, Sarasota, FL (1956)
- Silver Springs tourist center [now called Victor Lundy Tourist Center], Silver Springs, Florida (1957)
- Bee Ridge Presbyterian Church, Sarasota, FL (1957)
- Alta Vista Elementary School, a.k.a. The "Butterfly Wing," Sarasota, FL (1957)
- Joe Barth Insurance Office, Sarasota, FL (1957)
- Herron House, Venice, FL (1957)
- Waldman Building, 533 S. US 301 (1958)
- Warm Mineral Springs Motel, North Port, FL (1958)
- St. Paul's Lutheran Church Fellowship Hall (1959) and Sanctuary (1969), Sarasota, FL
- Galloway Furniture Showroom, Sarasota, FL [today, Visionworks] (1959)
- First Unitarian Church, Westport, CT (1960)
- United States Embassy, Colombo, Sri Lanka (1961–1985) Demolished early 2023.
- Sierra Blanca (New Mexico) Ski Apache Ski Resort Lodge (1961)
- Hillspoint Elementary School, Westport CT (1962)
- "Bubble Pavilions" for the New York World's Fair of 1964–65 (The Brass Rail Snack Bars)
- Unitarian Meeting House, Hartford, CT (1964)
- IBM Garden State Office, Cranford, NJ (1965)
- Church of the Resurrection Harlem, New York City (1966) Demolished.
- Wesley Foundation Chapel of the Upper Room, FSU, Tallahassee, FL (1970) Demolished 2015.
- St. Bernard's School Education Building, Gladstone, NJ (1970)
- Lundy Residence in Aspen, Colorado (1972)
- U.S. Tax Court Building, Washington, D.C. (completed 1974)
- Austin Centre, Austin, Texas (1986)
- One Congress Plaza, Austin, Texas (1987)

== World War II Sketches by Victor A. Lundy ==
Lundy is also well known for his World War II Sketches that were donated to the Library of Congress in 2009.

In 1942, Lundy was 19, studying to be an architect in New York City. He was enlisted in the Army Specialised Training Program (ASTP). During 1944, he joined the 104th Infantry Division, a sub-division of the 26th Infantry division of the US Army. He trained at Fort Jackson, before sailing from New York departing on 27 August 1944, to Cherbourg, arriving on 7 September 1944. He spent time in Normandy in September before moving to the Western Front by November.

He drew out his experiences from training at Fort Jackson (May 1944) to his journey across the Atlantic and then his time in France. In total, he produced a visual diary with 158 pencil sketches brings to life the wartime experience. Lundy applied his drawing skills to what was around him—training at Fort Jackson, South Carolina; forced marches; men at rest; the PX and tents; New York Harbor; aboard ship in the Atlantic crossing; Cherbourg Harbor; and French villages. Many vivid portraits of fellow soldiers and frontline danger also fill the pages. The sketches cover May to November 1944 when Lundy was wounded, with some gaps where notebooks were lost.

The eight surviving sketchbooks are spiral bound and 3 x 5 inches—small enough to fit in a breast pocket. Lundy used black Hardtmuth leads (a drawing pencil) and sketched quickly. "For me, drawing is sort of synonymous with thinking."

Lundy's sketches inspired the following books.

- "Drawn from War: The Sketches of Sergeant Victor A. Lundy" by Richard O'Hara, a compilation of Lundy's sketches and transcripts of interviews with Lundy.
- Normandy 1944 by Alberto Pérez Rubio of Desperta Ferro Ediciones, a Madrid-based publisher focusing on military history.
- The English GI: World War II Graphic Memoir, a graphic novel adaptation of an Englishman, Bernard Sandler, who also served in the 26th Infantry Division in France at the same time as Lundy.

== See also ==
- National Register of Historic Places listings in Sarasota County, Florida
