= Mackle Brothers =

Real estate developers

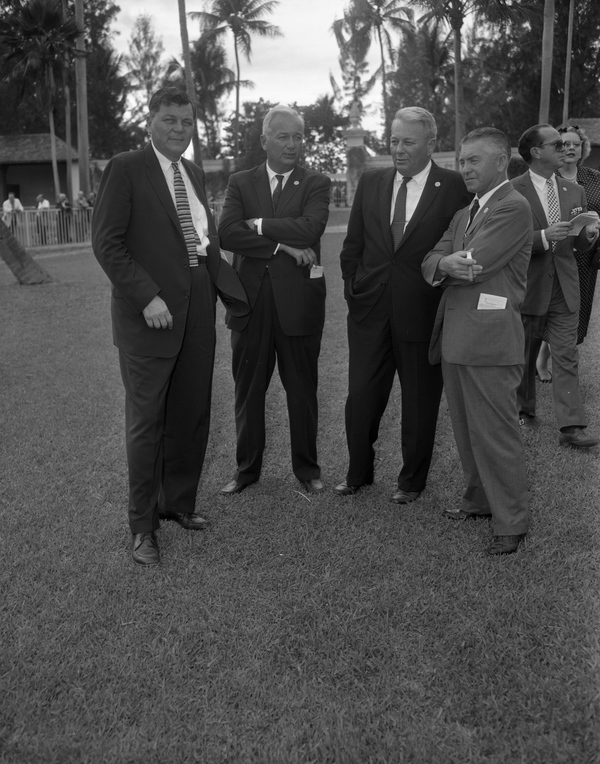
The Mackle brothers with their trainer Raymond Metcalf, right, pictured at Hialeah Race Track, 1958.

The Mackle brothers—Elliott, Robert and Frank Jr.—were brothers who developed real estate projects. They popularized selling land in planned communities through installment plans in Florida, creating several communities in the process.

Elliott J. Mackle was born in 1908 and died in 1978. Frank E. Mackle, Jr. was born in Atlanta in 1916 and graduated with a civil engineering degree from Vanderbilt University in 1938. Frank died at the age of 77 in Key Biscayne on July 29, 1993.

The Mackle Company was founded in 1908 in Jacksonville by Frank E. Mackle Sr. who ran the company there before going to Miami in 1937. When he died, it was taken over by Elliott, Robert and Frank. It built an $18 million US Navy project in Key West before getting into large sized residential work. Originally the brothers followed a strategy similar to that of the Levitts during the late 1940s building subdivisions around Miami. They started to change approaches by 1955 building large retirement orientated communities in rural parts of Florida where there were vast tracts of land that were also cheap.

The first installment company created by them was the General Development Corporation (GDC) in 1958. It was formed as a merger between Florida Canada Corporation and Mackle Bros. The Mackle brothers continued to lead the company until 1962 before selling the company to and taking over another company which "...had been the Cockshutt Farm Equipment Co., went through a period as C.K.P. Developments" before becoming the Deltona Corporation. Deltona ended up becoming a competitor to the GDC. The reason for their departure was because of a dispute involving the company's chairman, Gardner Cowles. Frank Mackle III joined Deltona in 1966 after he graduated from the University of Notre Dame.

Work began on developing Marco Island in 1969. The project at Marco Island was their most ambitious project undertaken. It did not go well and during the mid 1970s, the Deltona Corporation was denied permits for dredge and fill for waterfront development. The corporation was ordered to refund $38 million to customers who had paid for waterfront property but did not get it due to these permits being denied. During a 1981–1982 recession, the company held 1,200 condominiums that could not be sold and "was on the verge of financial collapse" when "a huge Minnesota utility"—the Topeka Group, a subsidiary of Minnesota Power & Light—agreed to buy out the company and take over. Following the takeover, Frank E. Mackle Jr. and Frank Mackle III left Deltona in 1986, ending the family's involvement in the company.

== Notable communities developed ==
- Beverly Hills
- Citrus Springs
- Deltona
- Key Biscayne
- Marco Island
- Marco Shores
- North Port
- Pine Ridge
- Port Charlotte
- Port St. Lucie
- Spring Hill
- St. Augustine Shores
- Sunny Hills
- Tampa Palms
