= Austin Centre =

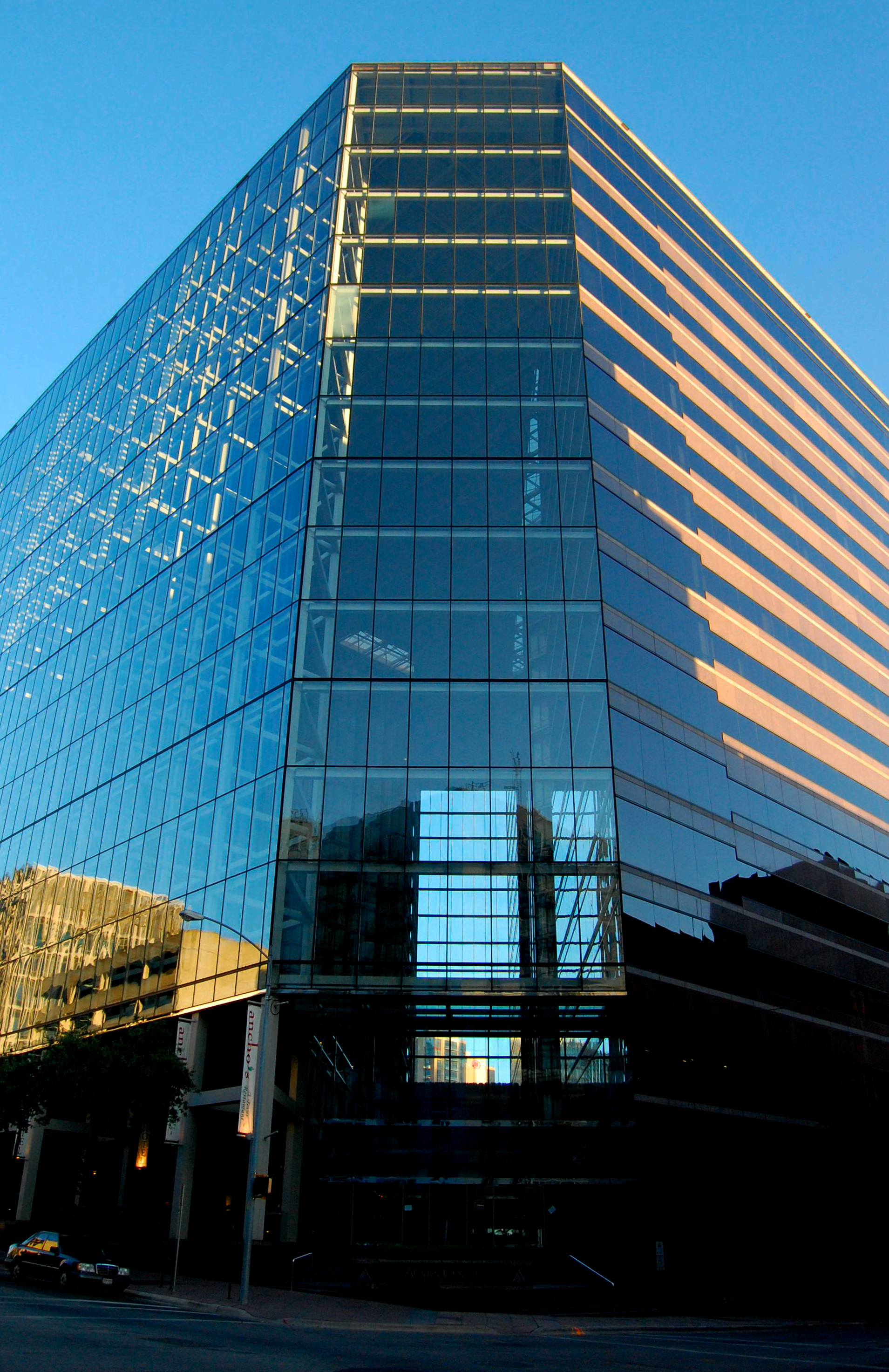
- View of the Austin Centre from the corner of 8th Street and Brazos Street
- Interactive map of the Austin Centre area

General information
- Type: Commercial
- Location: 701 Brazos Street, Austin, Texas, United States
- Coordinates: 30.268887486504337°N 97.74042168161323°W
- Construction started: 1984
- Completed: 1986

Height
- Roof: 226 ft (69 m)

Technical details
- Floor count: 16
- Floor area: 600,000 sq ft (56,000 m^{2})
- Lifts/elevators: 15

Design and construction
- Architect: HKS, Inc.

The Austin Centre is a 16-story mixed-use hi-rise in Downtown Austin, Texas. The building, notable for its large enclosed glass atrium, contains office space, retail space, and Omni Austin Hotel Downtown; the hotel component of the complex contains a rooftop pool and bar, and several conference rooms. The building is headquarters to companies like the Capital Factory, a startup incubator. The building's lobby is home to many large events, including the South by Southwest Startup Crawl.

== History ==
The ground was broken for the Austin Centre in August 1984; the land once contained the home of Mirabeau B. Lamar, although the house burned down in 1847. To accommodate the 700-space underground parking garage, builders had to drill through a solid chunk of limestone and "quarry" their way 55 feet to the bottom. The building opened in September 1986; the opening was marked with a series of lavish parties and an all-expense-paid tour for 35 writers from various trade publications. Upon its opening, the building touted innovative technological features such as computerized communications, energy management, and its very own on-site telephone company called "EntelCom". In 1988, a chemical reaction in the exterior glass paneling caused panes to break and fall to the street below, prompting a $2 million replacement.

The hotel component, which was originally a Radisson Plaza, became an Omni Hotel in June 1992. On the top five floors of the hotel are now hotel suites but were once condominiums; the residences were initially added to accommodate corporations needing "business entertainment headquarters" or temporary living accommodations for visiting executives or clients, or for government lobbyists while the Texas state Legislature was in session.

== Architecture ==
The Austin Centre was designed by famous Modernist architect Victor A. Lundy and HKS, Inc. The complex consists of two separate hi-rises connected by a 200 foot atrium containing 1 acre of glass. The complex does not have any street-facing activity, instead, the building's ground floor tenants are accessible from the inside. The exterior of the building contains 150,000 square feet of granite from Adoni, India, which was cut in Italy, then boated to Houston before being trucked to Dallas and Austin. The red granite is contrasted by bands of light-grey glass and accents of lighter, flame-finished granite. The building's north face features a full-height space frame and glass wall, providing a view of the Texas State Capitol from inside.

== In popular culture ==
The Austin Centre's lobby and glass elevators were featured in the 2001 film, Spy Kids.

== Gallery ==
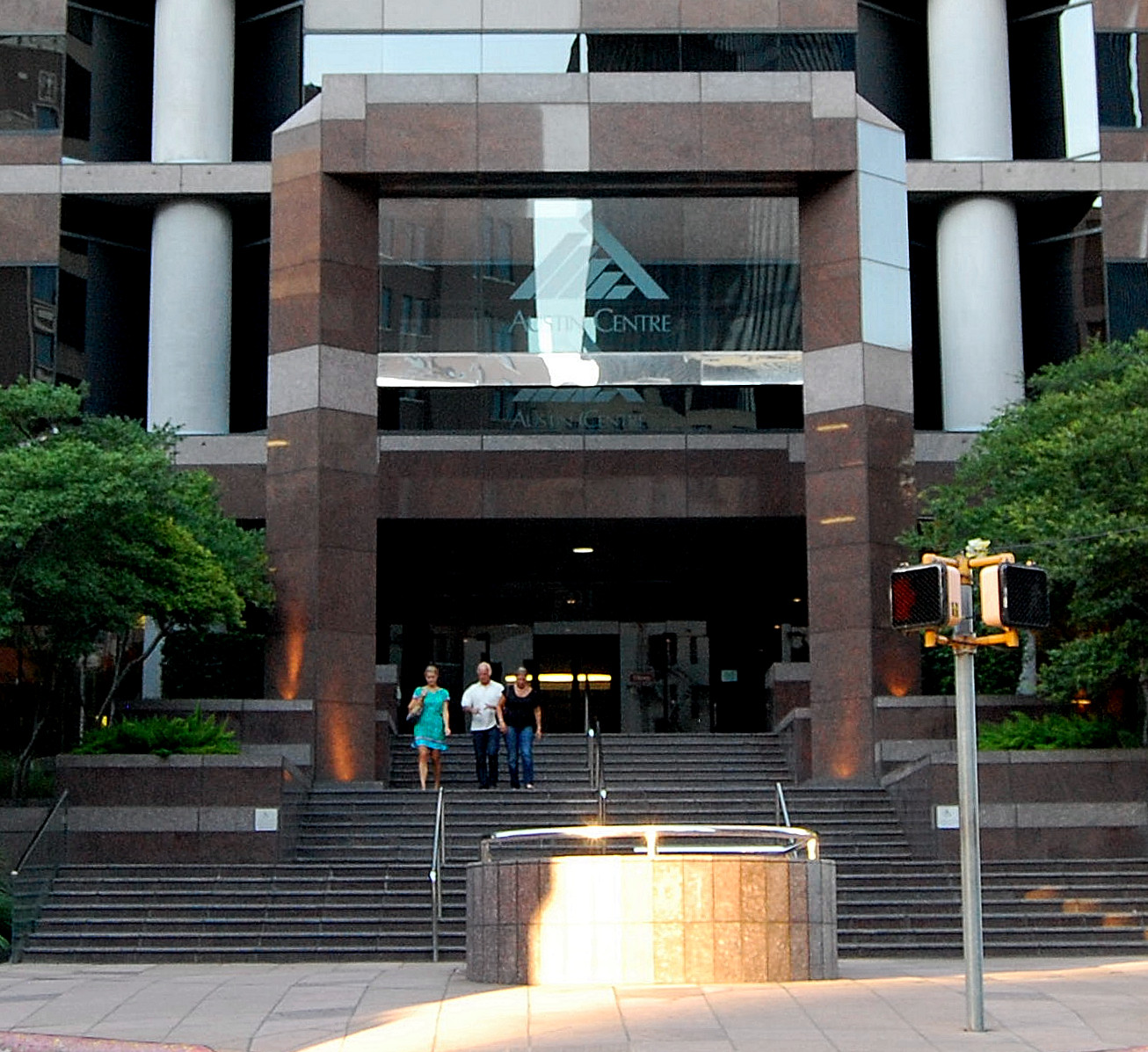
Austin Centre entrance on 7th Street and Brazos Street

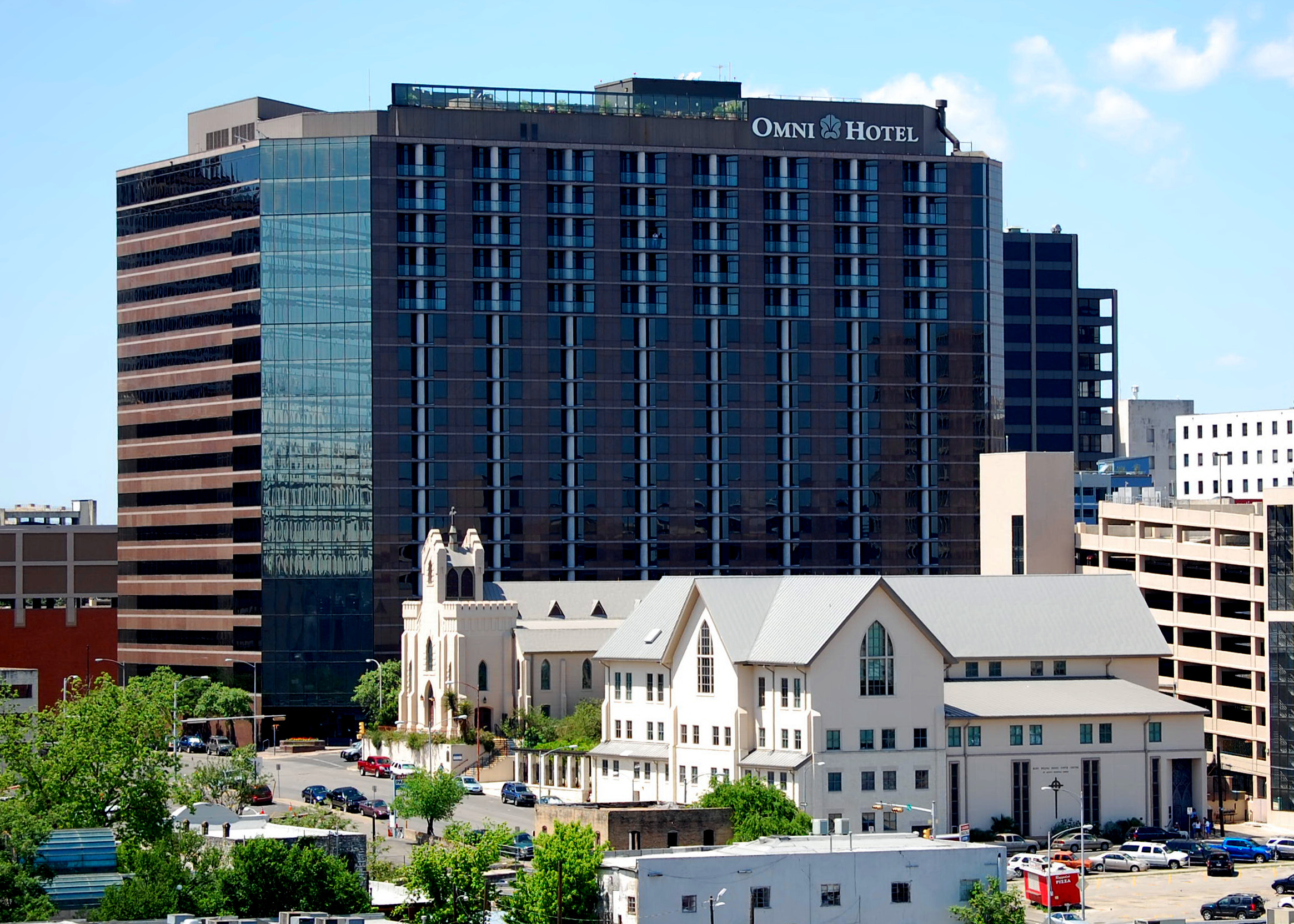
Austin Centre exterior
