= American Police Hall of Fame & Museum =

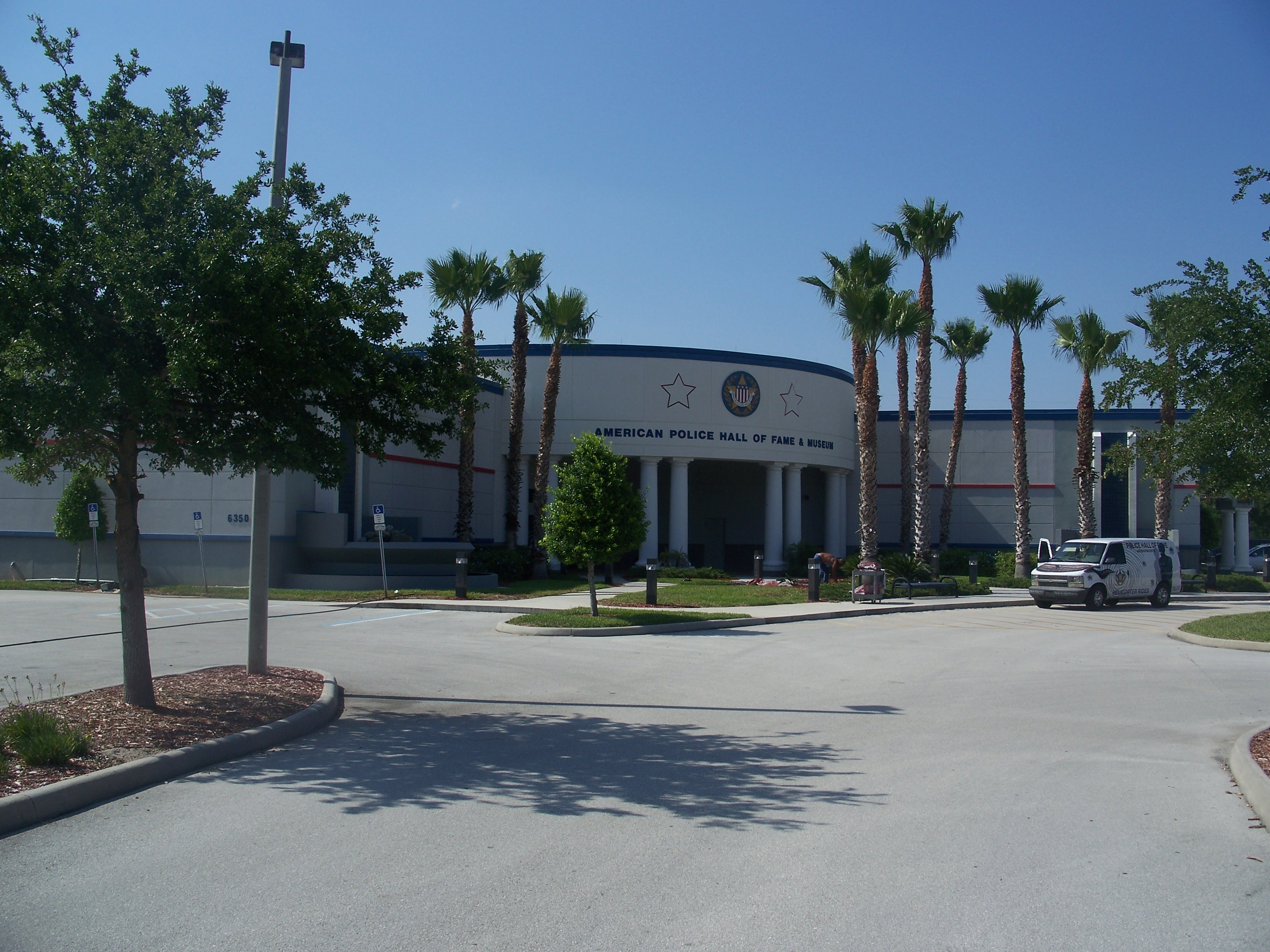

- Location within Florida
- Established: 1960
- Location: 6350 Horizon Drive; Titusville, Florida
- Coordinates: 28.52609°N 80.78373°W
- Type: Law Enforcement, Memorial, Hall of Fame
- Director: Barry Shepherd
- Website: American Police Hall of Fame & Museum

The American Police Hall of Fame & Museum was located at 6350 Horizon Drive just south of Titusville, Florida, adjacent to the Astronaut Hall of Fame. It housed law enforcement exhibits, a memorial and a Hall of Fame. It was the nation's first national police museum and a memorial dedicated to law enforcement officers killed in the line of duty.

The museum was founded in 1960 in North Port, Florida by Gerald Arenberg. He was a police officer injured in the line of duty by a drunk driver in 1955. It was his dream to build a memorial to honor all law enforcement officers killed in the line of duty, those that paid the ultimate sacrifice to keep the peace, to protect, and to serve. The museum was moved from North Port to the former FBI building in Miami, Florida in 1990. This building had 3 floors, housing the museum on the first 2 floors and the administration offices on the 3rd floor. By 2000 this facility became too small to house the growing number of exhibits, as well as the growing number of names in the memorial. In 2001, building began on the museum in Titusville. This facility opened in May, 2003. The Space Coast area was chosen because of its proximity to the Kennedy Space Center Visitor Complex, the United States Astronaut Hall of Fame, and Orlando.

The museum was supported and maintained by the National Association of Chiefs of Police. U.S. National Police Surgeon Linval K. Fleetwood MD, nominated by Chief Arenberg and appointed by U.S. President Bill Clinton, served the mission of the Hall of Fame & Museum from 1996 to 2007 by advising Congress about police issues, performing ceremonies for officers killed in the line of duty, and providing counseling for the families of those officers.

The museum closed on March 21, 2026. The building was sold on June 30, 2026 for $10.95 million.
