= Omni Austin Hotel Downtown =

Hotel located in Austin, Texas

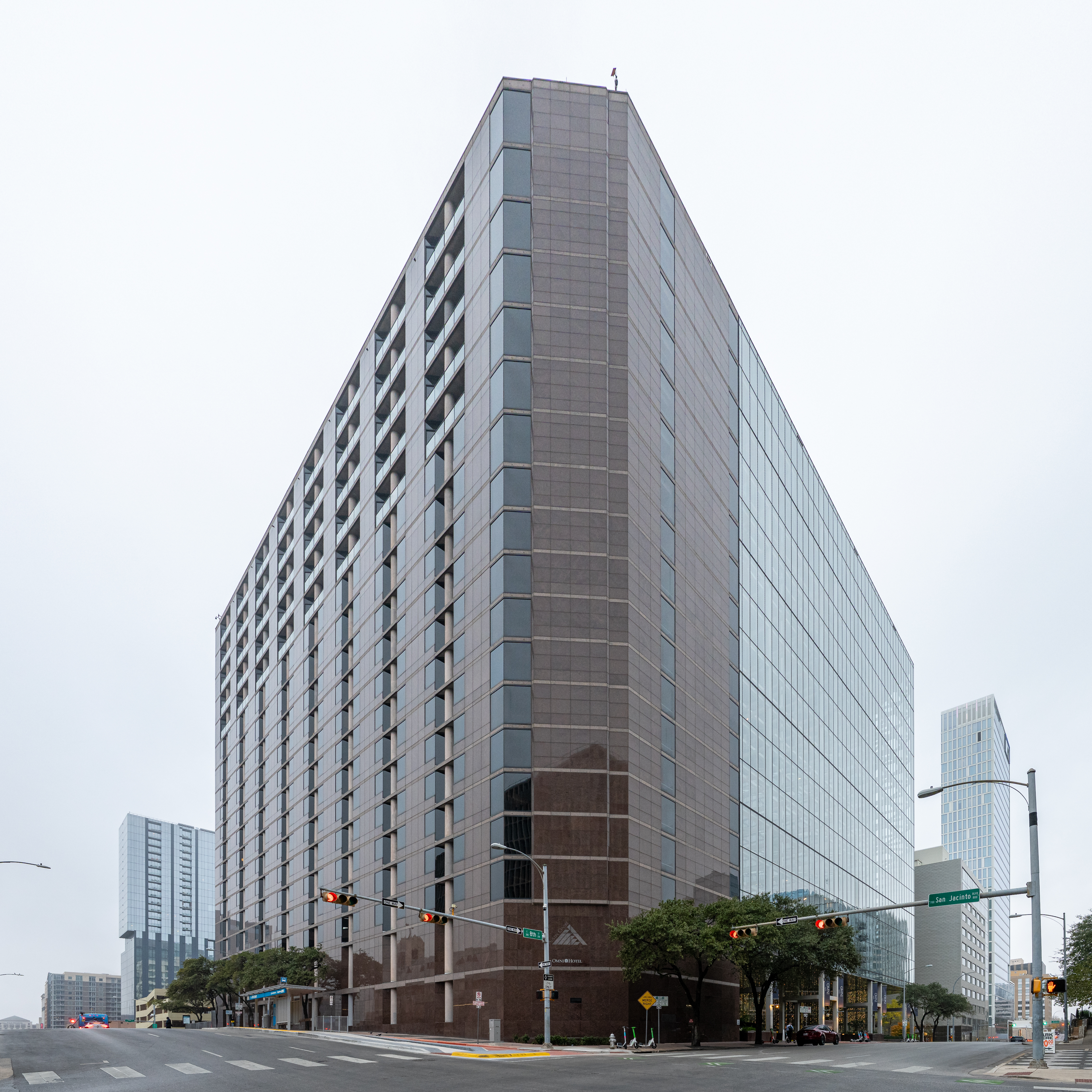
- Interactive map of Omni Austin Hotel Downtown
- Location: Austin; 700 San Jacinto at E 8th St; 30°16′7.923″N 97°44′25.53″W
- Opened: May 9, 1992
- No. of rooms: 393
- Owner: Omni Hotels & Resorts
- Architect: Jeffrey Beers International
- Previous names: Radisson Plaza
- Website: https://www.omnihotels.com/hotels/austin-downtown

Omni Austin Hotel Downtown is an Omni Hotel in Austin, Texas at Austin Centre. It opened in May 9, 1992, taking the space previously held by a Radisson Plaza.

== Ownership & renovations ==
In September 2007 Omni Hotels purchased the hotel section of Austin Centre from Walton Street Capital, shortly after Walton Street had purchased it from Crescent Real Estate. This purchase was followed by a $10 million guestroom renovation in the first half of 2008, followed by a meeting space update in the second half of 2008. A second renovation was completed by Jeffrey Beers International in 2022. The renovation costed $22 million and was unveiled August 30, 2022. A restaurant, a coffee shop, a ballroom, a podcast room, a fitness center and 18 guestrooms were added, adding up to a total of 393. Indoor faux greenery was introduced to contrast with the light oak woods.

== Awards ==
- 2014-2020 Trip Advisor Certificate of Excellence Award
- 2023 CVENT Top Meetings Hotels
- 2023 OPAL Award, INTERIOR DESIGN - Hospitality/Restaurants/Bars/Venues

== Access ==
The Austin-Bergstrom International Airport is a 15-minute drive and the Austin Convention Center is a 9-minute walk.
