= United States Tax Court Building =

Building in Washington, D.C.

- U.S. National Register of Historic Places
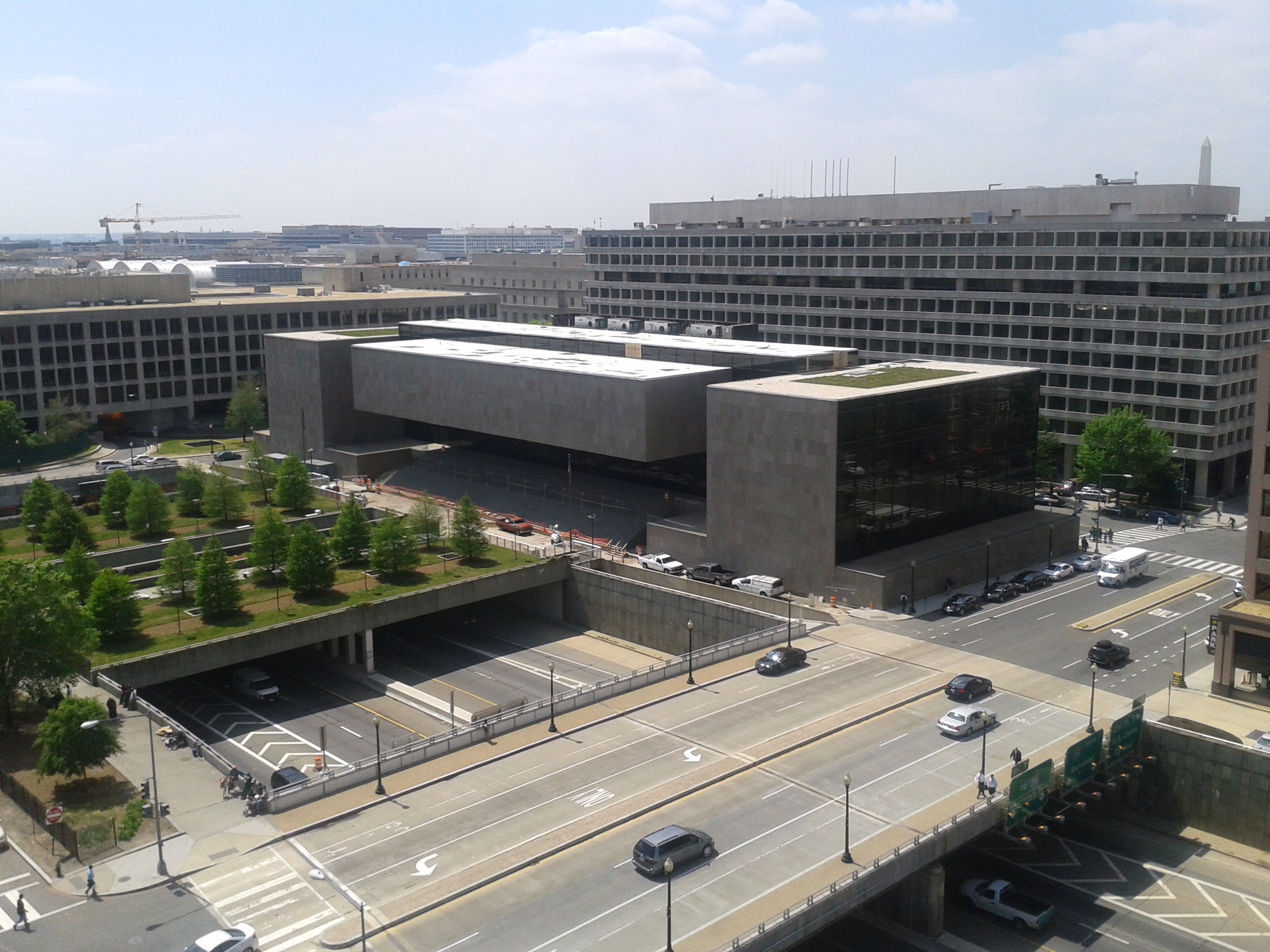
- Aerial view of the U.S. Tax Court Building, 2012

- Location within Central Washington, D.C. Location within the District of Columbia Location within the United States
- Location: 400 Second Street, NW, Washington, D.C.
- Coordinates: 38°53′43″N 77°0′52″W
- Built: 1974
- Architect: Victor A. Lundy
- NRHP reference No.: 08000821
- Added to NRHP: August 26, 2008

The United States Tax Court Building is a courthouse located at 400 Second Street, Northwest, Washington, D.C., in the Judiciary Square neighborhood. It serves as the headquarters of the United States Tax Court. Built in 1972, the building and its landscaped plaza occupy the entire block bound by D Street, E Street, Second Street, and Third street.

== Building history ==
Government officials selected architect Victor A. Lundy to design the building in 1965. They awarded Lundy the contract without competition. The design follows the "Guiding Principles for Federal Architecture" issued by the Ad Hoc Committee on Federal Office Space at the request of President John F. Kennedy in 1962. In an attempt to improve federal buildings, the committee recommended architecture that would convey the "dignity, enterprise, vigor, and stability of the American Government". Designers and officials were encouraged to pay special attention to site selection and layout, including landscape development.

In the 1930s, the U.S. Board of Tax Appeals, later renamed the Tax Court of the United States, was housed in the Internal Revenue Service Building in the Federal Triangle. By 1956, overcrowding and the desire to separate judicial and executive powers led to initial attempts to relocate the court. In 1962, Secretary of the Treasury Douglas Dillon appealed to the U.S. General Services Administration (GSA) to incorporate funds for the design of a new building in its upcoming budget. GSA subsequently allocated $450,000.

In 1966, GSA approved Lundy's concept for a building with strong end masses, a central cantilevered courtroom block, and a landscaped plaza. Despite enthusiastic support for the project, the Vietnam War triggered funding cuts that delayed construction until 1972, when GSA secured a site and held a groundbreaking ceremony. The completed building was dedicated on November 22, 1974, the fiftieth anniversary of the Revenue Act that created the court. Employees occupied the building on January 20, 1975. Due to escalating construction costs, the plaza was not completed until 1981.

Lundy's design won a GSA Honor Award in the first Design Awards Program held in 1972.

== Architecture ==
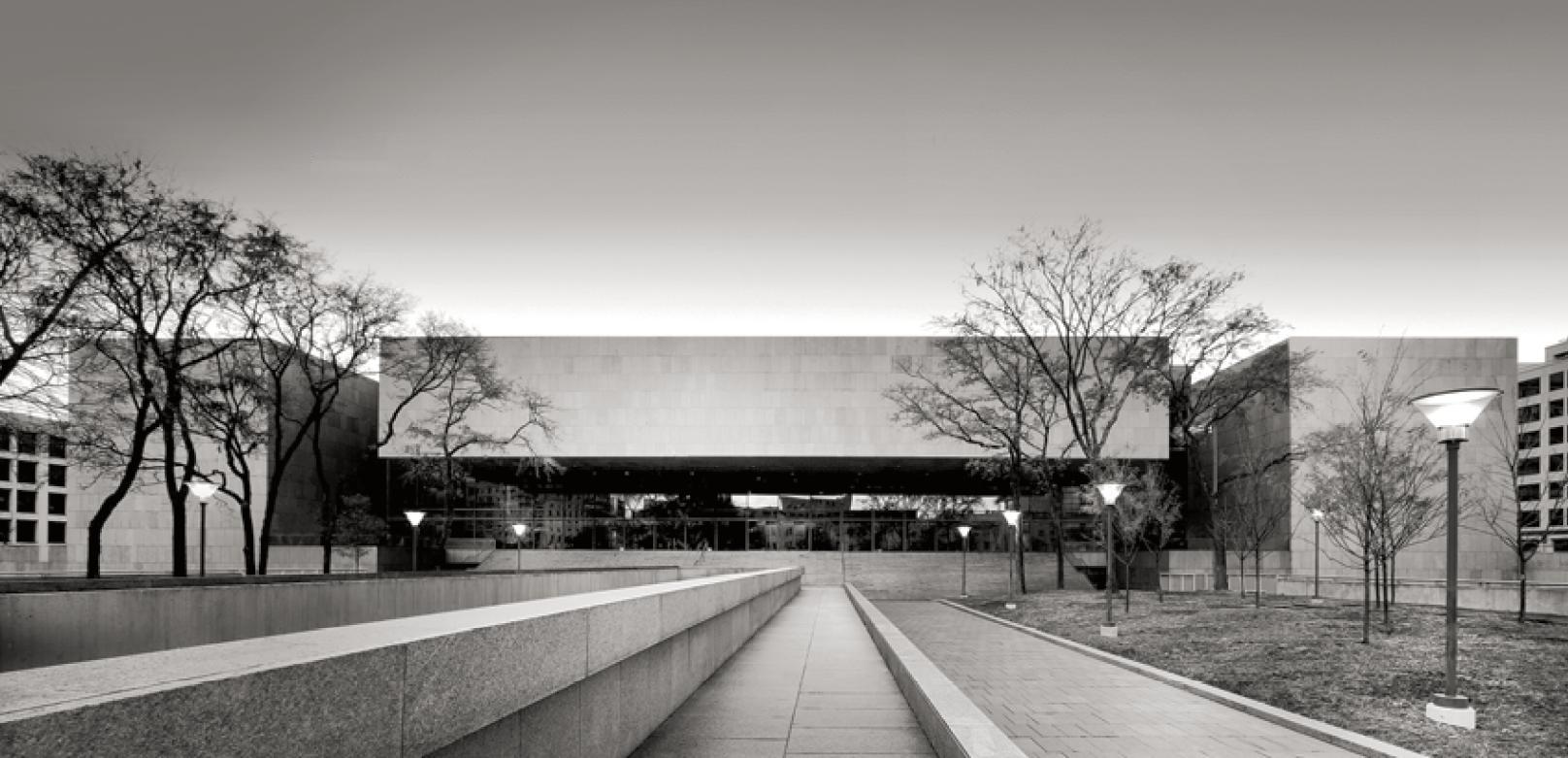
Frontal view of the United States Tax Court Building

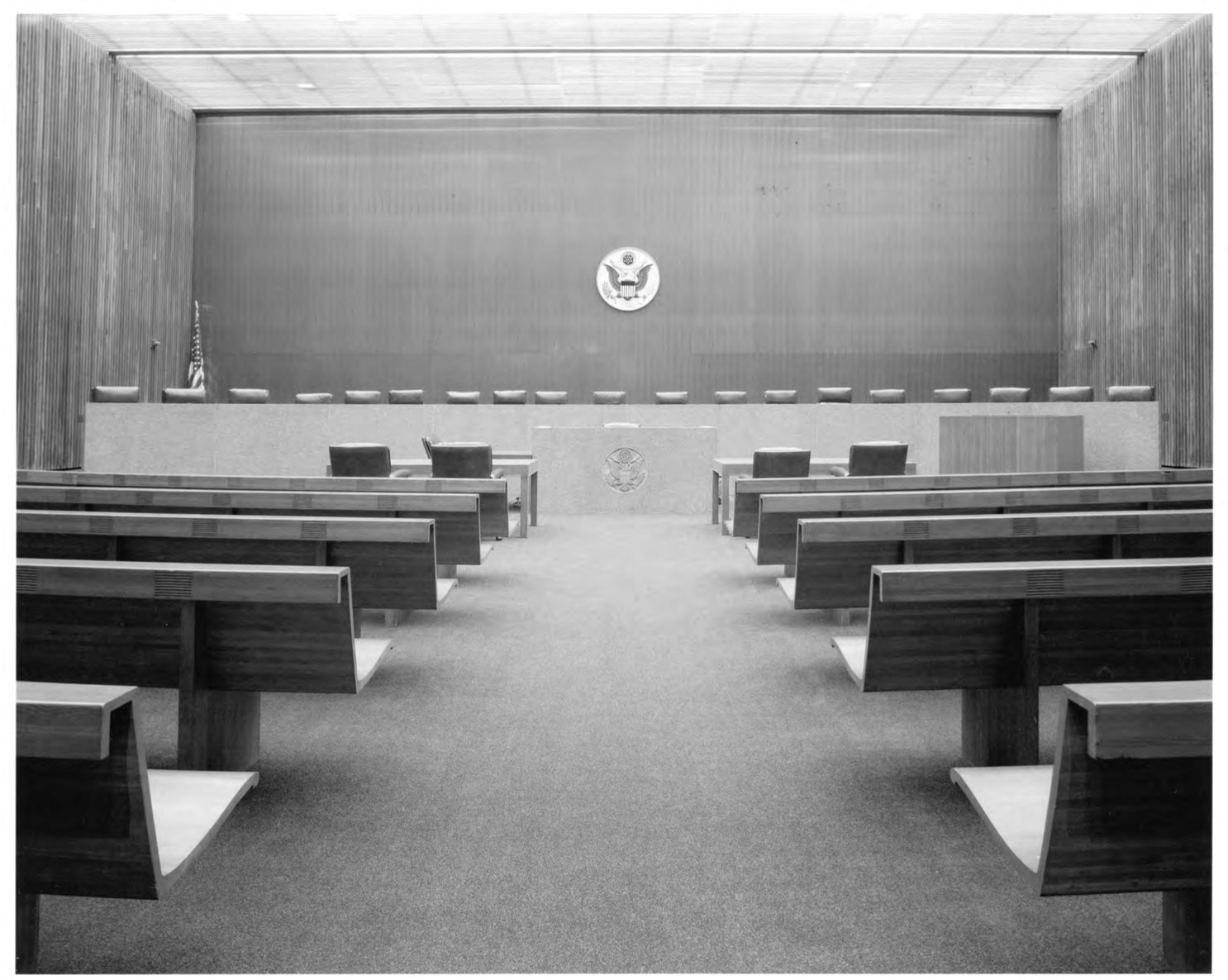
Courtroom in the United States Tax Court Building

Describing the building, Lundy stated, "What I've done is taken a monolithic block and broken it apart". The building displays the culmination of Modern design principles coupled with technological advances that allowed for a new type of building. Hailing the design in 1967, New York Times architectural critic Ada Louise Huxtable described the plans for the U.S. Tax Court Building as "a progressive, sensitive, contemporary solution fully responsive to Washington's classical tradition and yet fully part of the mid-20th century - a period of exceptional vigor and beauty in the history of structure and design".

The building presents itself as a cube that has been deconstructed into four units: a dramatic cantilevered courtroom block on the front with office blocks on each side and to the rear. These four components surmount a single-story base called the podium. The building is clad in flame-treated Royal Pearl granite from Georgia and bronze-tinted, heat-absorbing, glare-reducing glass with slim bronze-anodized aluminum mullions. Lundy's use of materials and voids between blocks articulate the units.

Lundy employed state-of-the-art engineering technology to achieve his design. The building's structure not only allowed Lundy's design to be securely executed, but also is considered a significant engineering accomplishment. Compression and post-tensioned bridges, steel cables hidden within the building's walls, and six slender columns together support the imposing 4,000-ton cantilevered courtroom block, which projects over the entrance. The compression and tension bridges also function as interior circulation bridges. In uniting the interior and exterior of the building, Lundy stated, "Inside this building, you will always have a sense of where you are and of the sky outside". The building's exterior forms indicate the interior spatial arrangements.

The interior is defined by a four-story central public hall, also called the Hall of Justice, crowned by a clerestory roof that admits light into the space. Lundy created a hierarchy of interior spaces through his use of materials. The walls of the public hall consist of exposed, board-formed concrete and the exterior bronze-tinted glass curtain wall. The floor is covered with Royal Pearl granite pavers. The same granite also surfaces the original security desk in the center of the hall. The upper three stories of the hall consist of projecting cantilevered galleries that provide circulation for the upper stories. A screen of louvered teak strips extends from the second to fourth floors and allows natural light to filter into the spaces. The hall ceiling is covered in tongue-in-groove hemlock planks.

The courtroom block projects from the east wall of the public hall. On the third floor, a large ceremonial courtroom is flanked by two smaller courtrooms. A curved wall encloses the central courtroom, which contains a semi-circular judges' bench. Courtrooms are finished in full-height teak veneer panels and strips. Hemlock grilles cover the ceilings.

Lundy designed the plaza, located on the Second Street side of the building, with a central reflecting pool flanked by landscaped areas. Interstate 395 runs directly beneath the plaza.

== Significant events ==
- 1924: Revenue Act creates the United States Board of Tax Appeals
- 1966: Commission of Fine Arts approves Lundy's design
- 1972: Building receives GSA Honor Award in the First Biennial Design Awards Program
- 1972–1974: U.S. Tax Court Building constructed
- 1974: Building dedicated on 50th anniversary of the Revenue Act
- 1981: Landscaped plaza completed

== Building facts ==
- Location: 400 Second Street, NW
- Architect: Victor A. Lundy
- Construction Dates: 1972–1974
- Architectural Style: Modern (Formalism)
- Primary Materials: Granite and bronze-tinted glass
- Prominent Features: Cantilevered courtroom block; Hall of Justice; Landscaped plaza
