= Warm Mineral Springs Motel =

- U.S. National Register of Historic Places
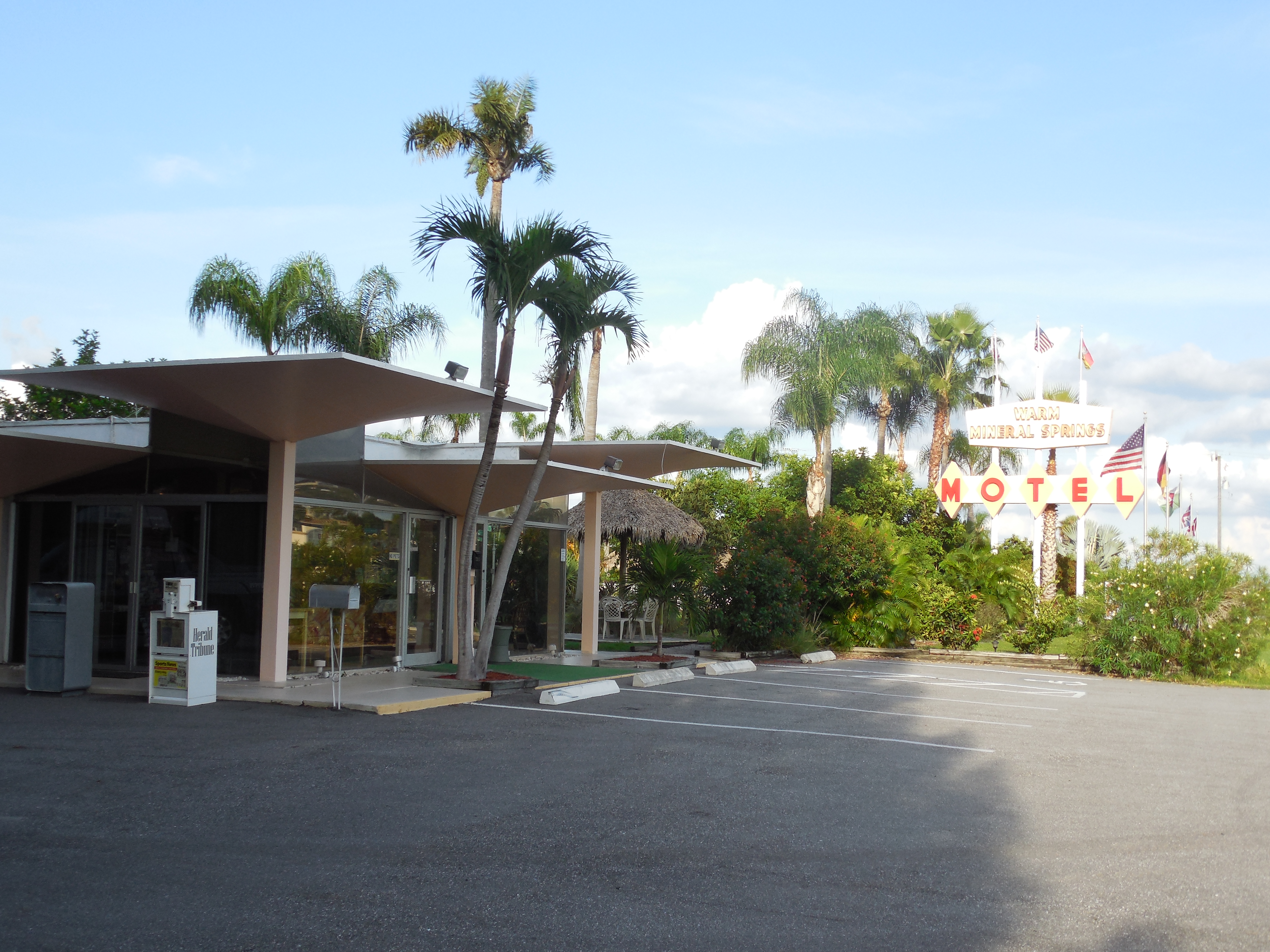

- Location within Florida Location within the United States
- Location: Warm Mineral Springs, Florida
- Coordinates: 27°02′51″N 82°15′43″W
- NRHP reference No.: 12001255
- Added to NRHP: February 5, 2013

Warm Mineral Springs Motel is a historic 1958 motel building near Warm Mineral Springs, Florida, in Sarasota County. It was designed by Victor Lundy, a member of the Sarasota School of Architecture. It is listed on the National Register of Historic Places. The motel is located at 12597 South Tamiami Trail.

The motel is known for its mushroom champagne glass style roof and glass walls, allowing guests to see the stars. It was selected by the American Institute of Architects for the 1958 Special Awards.

Lundy wrote in a 1958 issue of The Florida Association of Architects: "I was searching for a form that would somehow symbolize the thought of the Fountain of Youth by a plastic flowing shape, that would also echo the organic growing shape of a tree. The answer came in the adoption of a structural system based on using precast concrete hyperbolic paraboloids, 14ft-5in square (from basic motel unit width-requirement, plus necessary overlap) in two heights arranged in a U-shaped plan (the remaining wing will be added shortly). Three of the so called shells were lifted up on higher columns of varying height to form the sign of the motel, as a free-standing piece of sculpture."

The reception desk is original (from 1958). The pool area was added in 1990.

== Gallery ==
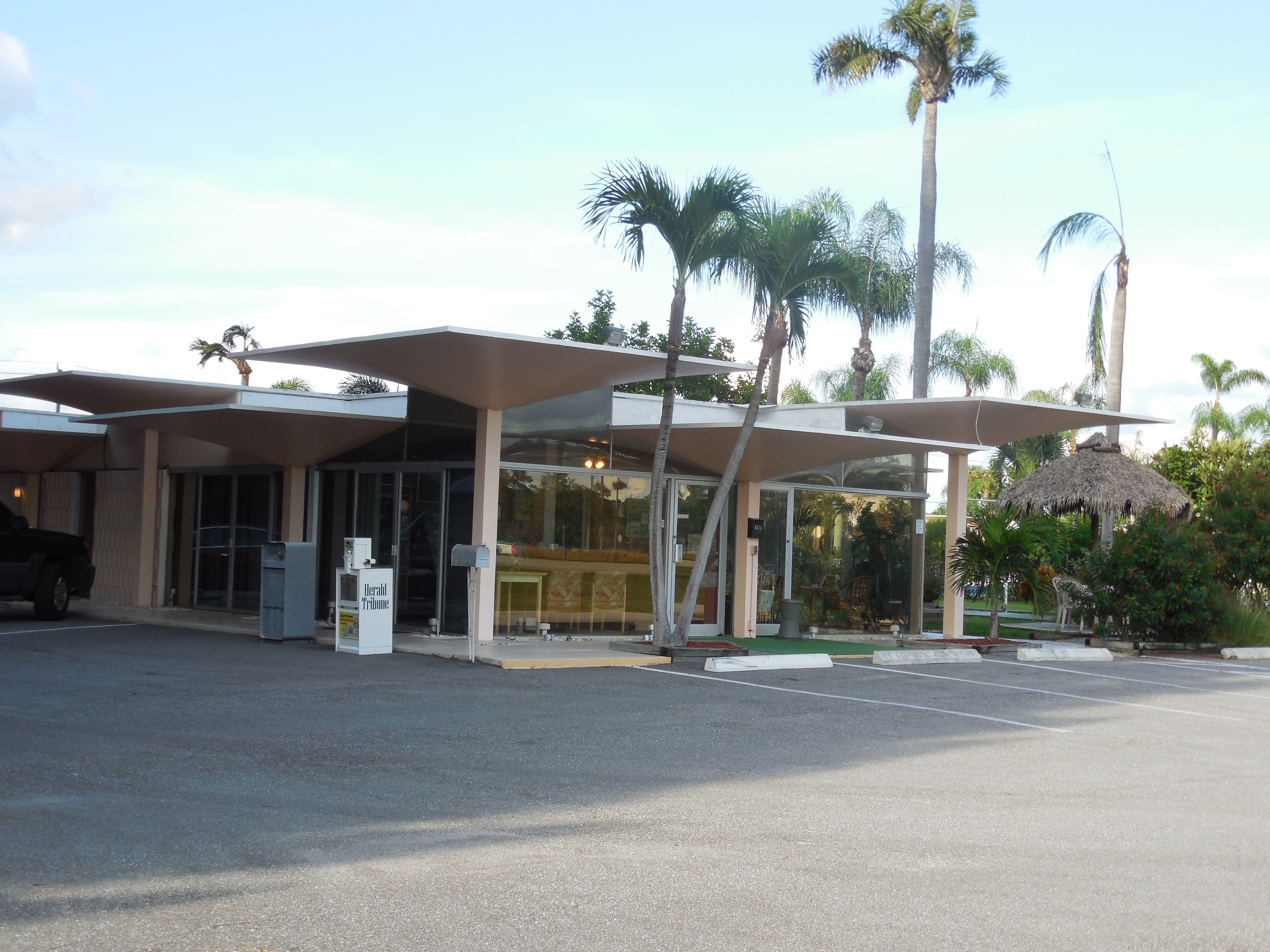
Motel office

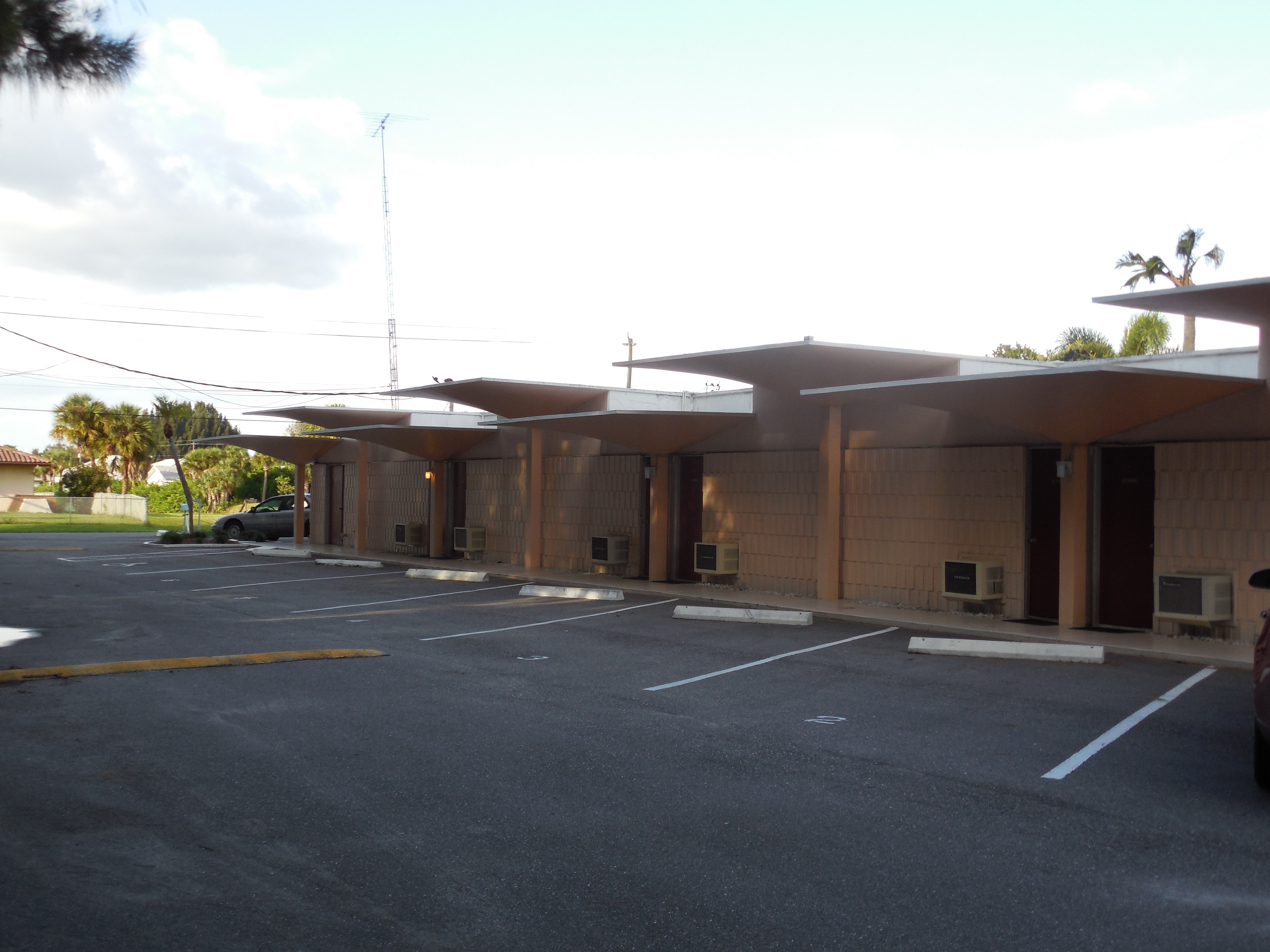
Parking lot side

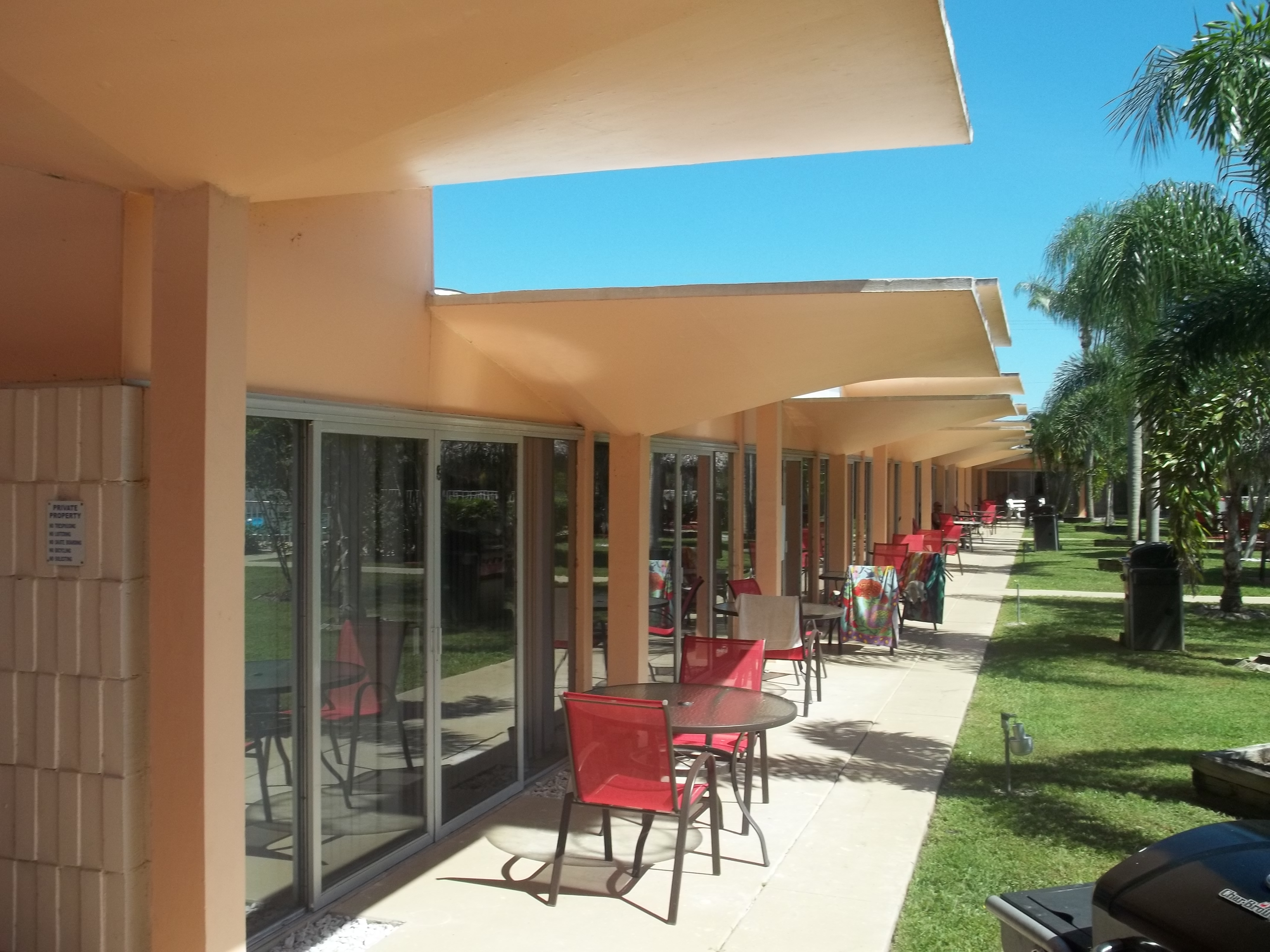
Walkway and some of the rooms

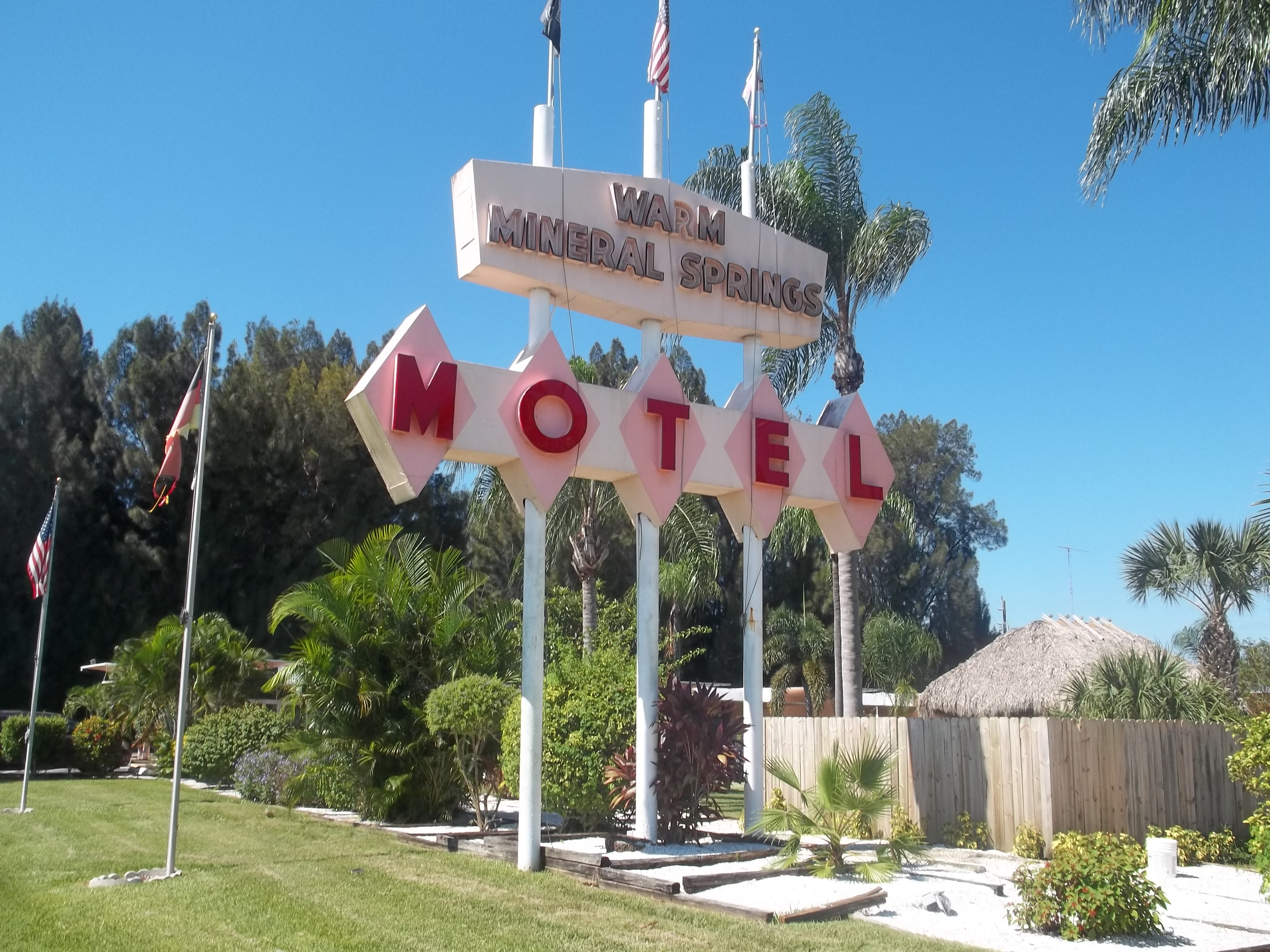
Current motel sign (not original)

== See also ==
- National Register of Historic Places listings in Sarasota County, Florida
- List of motels
