= General Development Corporation =

Land development company in Florida

- Type: Public company
- Predecessor: Florida Canada Corporation, Mackle Co.
- Founded: 1958
- Founder: Elliot, Robert and Frank Mackle
- Defunct: 1991
- Fate: Exonerated in 1991 for fraudulent home sales. Restitution was set up and succeeded by Atlantic Gulf Communities.
- Successor: Atlantic Gulf Communities
- Headquarters: Miami, Florida
- Number of employees: (5,000 (1970))

General Development Corporation, also known as GDC, was a land development company in Florida. General Development Corporation would be created in 1958 after a merger between Florida Canada Corporation and the Mackle Bros.

== Origins and history ==
=== Origins ===
Florida Canada Corporation would be incorporated in 1928 in Canada originally under the name of Chemical Research Corporation. Chemical Research devoted its activities towards developing "technical process," along with equipment for the mining and petroleum industry. Both the Mackle Company and Chemical Research would create 4 subsidiaries for developing property on both coasts of Florida during October 1954. Over time, the company became more diversified and by 1956, most of the company's operations had been concentrated in Floridian real estate and ended up changing their name to Florida Canada Corporation. Also that year, the 4 subsidiaries, which were jointly owned by each other, would be merged into one subsidiary: General Development Corporation.

The Mackle Co. would be founded by Frank E. Mackle, Sr. in 1908 in Jacksonville and was the largest homebuilding company in Florida at one point. It would end up moving its operations to Miami in 1937. When Frank died, his three sons, Elliott, Robert and Frank Jr., would end up taking over the company.

Both Florida Canada and the Mackle firm would be merged into one entity in 1958. The Mackle brothers would end up leaving GDC after getting into a dispute with the company's chairman, Gardner Cowles and ended up forming the Deltona Corporation in 1962, which would be a competitor to GDC.

=== Further history ===
Charles H. Kellstadt, the former chairman and CEO of Sears would become both the CEO and chairman of GDC after he left Sears in 1962. He would serve in both roles until stepping down in 1973 and then served as the company's president from 1965 to 1970. Starting in the late 1970s, liabilities grew for promised construction for thousands of lots, but when construction started, money became low. To solve this problem, the company decided to buy, plan and sell more lots to get more money flowing and develop the lots sold a decade earlier.

=== Legal troubles and dissolution ===
In the late 1980s, GDC's management team was accused of fraudulent home sales, which led to criminal indictments of the company leadership and the company itself. The company itself would plead guilty to federal mail fraud charges on March 16, 1990. Prior to this, it had been investigated by the federal government for two years for falsely inflating the prices of houses. In a plea agreement, GDC "agreed in principle" to make a restitution fund for those who bought homes between January 1, 1982 and December 31, 1989. It would later file for Chapter 11 bankruptcy in April.

It was decided that Chairman David F. Brown and President Robert F. Ehrling would be prosecuted separately from the company. Both had resigned a week prior to the company pleading guilty to mail fraud. Both Ehrling and Brown would be convicted in August 1992 and sentenced on January 6, 1993. Ehrling would receive 40 counts of fraud and a 10 year prison sentence while Brown got a maximum five year sentence, along with a conspiracy charge. Their convictions and sentencing would come along with two other corporate executives, Torre DeBella, senior vice president of marketing and Richard Reizen, the marketing vice president. DeBella was sentenced to 8 years in prison and 40 counts of fraud, while Reizen got a maximum 5 year sentence and a charge of conspiracy. Functional assets held by GDC in various cities were turned over to their respective governments thereafter.

Subsequent to the indictments and convictions of senior management, the 11th Circuit Court of Appeals exonerated the men, reversing their convictions and directing that all charges against them be dismissed (see US v. Brown, 79 F.3rd 1550 (1996) for a complete discussion of the case and a general exoneration of General Development Corporation.

==== Succession ====
Atlantic Gulf Communities was created with GDC's bankruptcy. Ehrling was released from prison in 1996 after his convictions were overturned via appeal. Once leaving prison, he reconnected with Reizen, who had also been released from prison after an appeals court ruling. The two would get into real estate development once again and buy over 3,000 vacant lots from Atlantic. It was part of a plan by Atlantic to get $200 million to sell off half of the 87,000 acres and 9 water processing plants it had, but this idea "never fully materialized," with Atlantic filing for bankruptcy protection in 2001. New Vista Properties would end up being created after these purchases from Atlantic.

== Communities developed by GDC ==
- Port Charlotte, Florida
- North Port, Florida
- Port Malabar, now a subdivision in Palm Bay, Florida
- Port St. Lucie, Florida
- Sebastian Highlands, Florida, in Sebastian, Florida
- Gulf Cove
- South Gulf Gove
- Englewood East

== Operations ==
As each community began to be developed, the developer built the roads, sewer and water plants, golf courses, marinas, other basic amenities and even operated landfills. These new communities had the feel of "company towns." When North Port was incorporated, GDC employees even made up the first City Council.

== Errata ==
The company had a court-appointed CEO, Thomas J. Hutchison III, from 1990 to 1991.

== See also ==
- The Compound
- Gulf American Land Corporation
