= Warm Mineral Springs, Florida =

- Census-designated place
- Location in Sarasota County and the state of Florida
- Coordinates: 27°02′50″N 82°16′13″W
- Country: United States
- State: Florida
- County: Sarasota

Area
  - Total: 2.71 sq mi (7.03 km^{2})
  - Land: 2.36 sq mi (6.11 km^{2})
  - Water: 0.36 sq mi (0.92 km^{2})
- Elevation: 7 ft (2.1 m)

Population (2020)
  - Total: 5,442
  - Density: 2,306.4/sq mi (890.52/km^{2})
- Time zone: UTC-5 (Eastern (EST))
  - Summer (DST): UTC-4 (EDT)
- FIPS code: 12-75175
- GNIS feature ID: 2402984

Warm Mineral Springs is a census-designated place (CDP) in Sarasota County, Florida, United States. The population was 5,442 at the 2020 census, up from 5,061 at the 2010 census. It is part of the North Port–Bradenton–Sarasota, Florida Metropolitan Statistical Area.

The Warm Mineral Springs locale is notable for a free-flowing artesian spring. A large portion of the area was annexed by the municipality of North Port, and is now part of that city. The Warm Mineral Springs Motel designed by modernist architect Victor Lundy, one of the architects associated with the Sarasota School of Architecture, is listed on the National Register of Historic Places.

== Geography ==
According to the United States Census Bureau, the CDP has a total area of 2.7 square miles (6.9 km^{2}), of which 2.3 square miles (5.9 km^{2}) is land and 0.35 square miles (0.9 km^{2}), or 13.33%, is water.

== Demographics ==
Historical population
| Census | Pop. | Note | %± |
|---|---|---|---|
| 1990 | 4,041 | | — |
| 2000 | 4,811 | | 19.1% |
| 2010 | 5,061 | | 5.2% |
| 2020 | 5,442 | | 7.5% |

=== 2020 census ===
As of the 2020 census, Warm Mineral Springs had a population of 5,442. The population density was 2,306.9 inhabitants per square mile (890.7/km^{2}). The median age was 70.6 years. 6.5% of residents were under the age of 18 and 64.3% of residents were 65 years of age or older. For every 100 females there were 89.2 males, and for every 100 females age 18 and over there were 87.9 males age 18 and over.

100.0% of residents lived in urban areas, while 0.0% lived in rural areas.

There were 2,995 households in Warm Mineral Springs, of which 7.6% had children under the age of 18 living in them. Of all households, 50.0% were married-couple households, 16.4% were households with a male householder and no spouse or partner present, and 27.6% were households with a female householder and no spouse or partner present. About 36.6% of all households were made up of individuals and 29.5% had someone living alone who was 65 years of age or older.

There were 4,139 housing units, of which 27.6% were vacant. The homeowner vacancy rate was 2.4% and the rental vacancy rate was 17.4%.

Racial composition as of the 2020 census
| Race | Number | Percent |
|---|---|---|
| White | 4,991 | 91.7% |
| Black or African American | 100 | 1.8% |
| American Indian and Alaska Native | 6 | 0.1% |
| Asian | 38 | 0.7% |
| Native Hawaiian and Other Pacific Islander | 1 | 0.0% |
| Some other race | 92 | 1.7% |
| Two or more races | 214 | 3.9% |
| Hispanic or Latino (of any race) | 253 | 4.6% |

=== Demographic estimates ===
According to Census Bureau QuickFacts, 1.8% of the population was under 5 years old.

=== Income and poverty ===
The median income for a household in the CDP was $47,690. 10.8% of the population lived below the poverty threshold. 94.4% of the population 25 years and older were high school graduates or higher and 19.1% of that same population had a Bachelor's degree or higher. 89.4% of households had a computer and 83.1% had a broadband internet subscription.
