= North Port, Florida =

- City
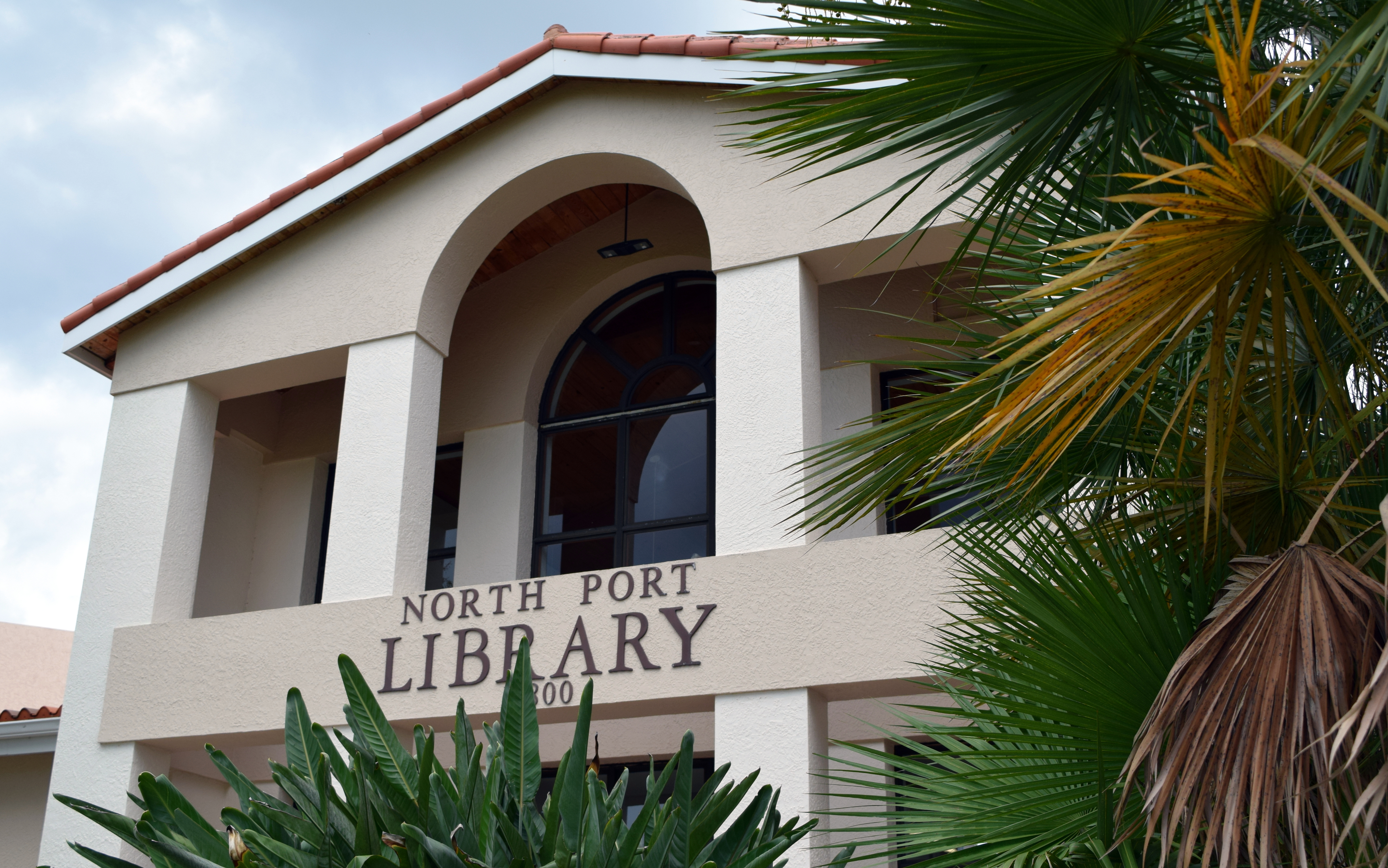
- North Port Public Library

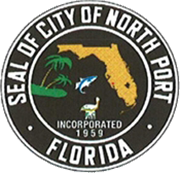
- Seal
- Etymology: Shortened form of North Port Charlotte
- Motto: "Achieve Anything"
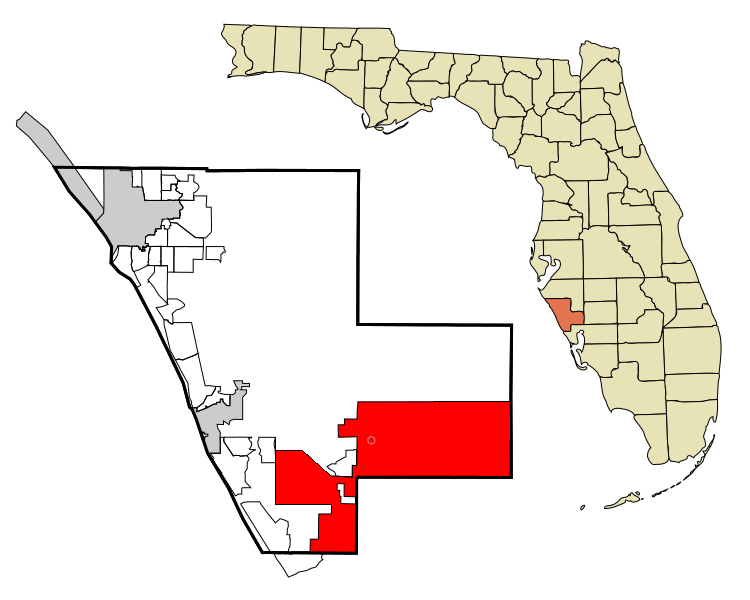
- Location in Sarasota County, Florida

- Location within Florida Location within the United States
- Coordinates: 27°03′58″N 82°11′19″W
- Country: United States
- State: Florida
- County: Sarasota
- Incorporated (City of North Port Charlotte): June 18, 1959
- Reincorporated (City of North Port): 1974

Government
  - Type: Commission-Manager

Area
  - City: 104.21 sq mi (269.91 km^{2})
  - Land: 99.38 sq mi (257.39 km^{2})
  - Water: 4.83 sq mi (12.52 km^{2}) 4.40%
- Elevation: 16 ft (4.9 m)

Population (2020)
  - City: 74,793
  - Estimate (2025): 96,551
  - Density: 752.6/sq mi (290.58/km^{2})
  - Urban (Port Charlotte–North Port, FL): 199,998 (US: 194th)
  - Urban density: 1,484.8/sq mi (573.3/km^{2})
  - Metro (North Port-Sarasota-Bradenton, FL MSA): 859,760 (US: 70th)
  - CSA (North Port-Sarasota, FL CSA): 1,089,011 (US: 56th)
- Time zone: UTC−05:00 (EST)
  - Summer (DST): UTC−04:00 (EDT)
- ZIP codes: 34286-34291, 34293
- Area codes: 941
- FIPS code: 12-49675
- GNIS feature ID: 2404398
- Website: northportfl.gov

North Port is a city in Sarasota County, Florida, United States. The population was 74,793 at the 2020 census. It is a principal city in the Sarasota metropolitan area.

It was originally developed by General Development Corporation (GDC) as the northern Sarasota County portion of its Port Charlotte development, the other portion located in the adjacent Charlotte County. GDC dubbed the city, "North Port Charlotte", and it was incorporated under that name through a special act of the Florida Legislature on June 18, 1959. By referendum in 1974, the city's residents approved a change to its name as "North Port", dropping "Charlotte" from its name to proclaim the city as a separate identity. It is home to the Little Salt Spring, an archaeological and paleontological site owned by the University of Miami.

North Port includes Wellen Park, a community of over 7,000 acres with distinct neighborhoods, and a vibrant downtown.

== History ==
Archaeological digs at the Little Salt Spring show that what is now North Port was inhabited by pre-Columbian Native Americans. Evidence of their existence includes projectile points, a carved oak mortar, and a piece of a nonreturnable wooden boomerang.

In 1954, the Mackle Brothers started the General Development Corporation (GDC) with the intention of selling property in Florida to northerners. Not only would they plat and sell a majority of what is now North Port, the company's employees served on the city's first council. The city itself was incorporated in 1959. The city was incorporated with 21 residents, most of whom were GDC employees, in order to bypass county regulations related to infrastructure.

On September 28, 2022, Hurricane Ian made direct landfall in Florida just south of Sarasota County. North Port, in particular, experienced excessive flooding and the Holiday Park mobile home community was almost completely destroyed.

== Geography ==
North Port is a municipality containing large-scale residential subdivisions along with an extensive network of streets. The municipality has annexed nearby locales, including the area known as Warm Mineral Springs, the location of a notable artesian spring, as well as its own significant residential subdivision.

Myakkahatchee Creek Environmental Park is in North Port.

=== Climate ===
The climate in this area is characterized by hot, humid summers and generally mild winters. According to the Köppen climate classification, the City of North Port has a humid subtropical climate zone (Cfa).

== Demographics ==
Historical population
Census	Pop.	Note	%±
1960	178		—
1970	2,244		1,160.7%
1980	6,205		176.5%
1990	11,973		93.0%
2000	22,797		90.4%
2010	57,357		151.6%
2020	74,793		30.4%
2025 (est.)	96,551		29.1%
U.S. Decennial Census

=== Racial and ethnic composition ===
North Port racial composition (Hispanics excluded from racial categories) (NH = Non-Hispanic)
Race	Pop 2010	Pop 2020	% 2010	% 2020
White (NH)	46,752	58,417	81.51%	78.10%
Black or African American (NH)	3,824	3,788	6.67%	5.06%
Native American or Alaska Native (NH)	109	154	0.19%	0.21%
Asian (NH)	648	1,249	1.13%	1.67%
Pacific Islander or Native Hawaiian (NH)	23	35	0.04%	0.05%
Some other race (NH)	112	371	0.20%	0.50%
Two or more races/Multiracial (NH)	885	2,924	1.54%	3.91%
Hispanic or Latino (any race)	5,004	7,855	8.72%	10.50%
Total	57,357	74,793	100.00%	100.00%

=== 2020 census ===
As of the 2020 census, North Port had a population of 74,793. The median age was 49.0 years, 19.4% of residents were under the age of 18, and 27.6% were 65 years of age or older. For every 100 females there were 94.7 males, and for every 100 females age 18 and over there were 92.7 males age 18 and over. Additionally, 4.8% of residents were under 5 years old and 52.5% of the population was female.

About 95.8% of residents lived in urban areas, while 4.2% lived in rural areas.

There were 29,827 households in North Port; 26.1% had children under the age of 18 living in them. Of all households, 58.2% were married-couple households, 13.0% were households with a male householder and no spouse or partner present, and 21.2% were households with a female householder and no spouse or partner present. About 20.2% of all households were made up of individuals, and 11.9% had someone living alone who was 65 years of age or older.

The city had 19,716 families.

There were 33,672 housing units, of which 11.4% were vacant. The homeowner vacancy rate was 1.9% and the rental vacancy rate was 8.5%.

Racial composition as of the 2020 census
Race	Number	Percent
White	60,346	80.7%
Black or African American	3,967	5.3%
American Indian and Alaska Native	239	0.3%
Asian	1,281	1.7%
Native Hawaiian and Other Pacific Islander	40	0.1%
Some other race	2,385	3.2%
Two or more races	6,535	8.7%
Hispanic or Latino (of any race)	7,855	10.5%

In 2020, the median household income was $64,543. The per capita income was $34,514, and 7.0% of residents were below the poverty line.

=== 2010 census ===
As of the 2010 United States census, there were 57,357 people, 20,201 households, and 14,018 families residing in the city.

== Economy ==
North Port is the Spring Training home for the Atlanta Braves, who hold extended spring training in North Port.

== Arts and culture ==
In 1960, the American Police Hall of Fame & Museum was opened in North Port. The opening ceremony included remarks from the then Presidential candidate John F. Kennedy. The museum has since relocated, first to Miami, and then to the present location in Titusville, Florida.

In 2007, the North Port Art Guild leased a building from the city and established the North Port Art Center. The center hosts exhibits as well as classes.

== Government ==
North Port has a city commission/city manager form of government.

The current city manager is Alfred Jerome Fletcher, II. The city commission has five members. The mayor/vice mayor roles are voted upon annually from the commission ranks.

As of 2024, the current commission includes:

- Commissioner Demetrius Petrow (District 1)
- Commissioner Barbara Langdon (District 2)
- Commissioner David Duval (District 3)
- Vice Mayor Pete Emrich (District 4)
- Mayor Phil Stokes (District 5)

The city of North Port has its own police force, fire department, and waste management. City Hall of North Port is located at 4970 City Hall Boulevard.

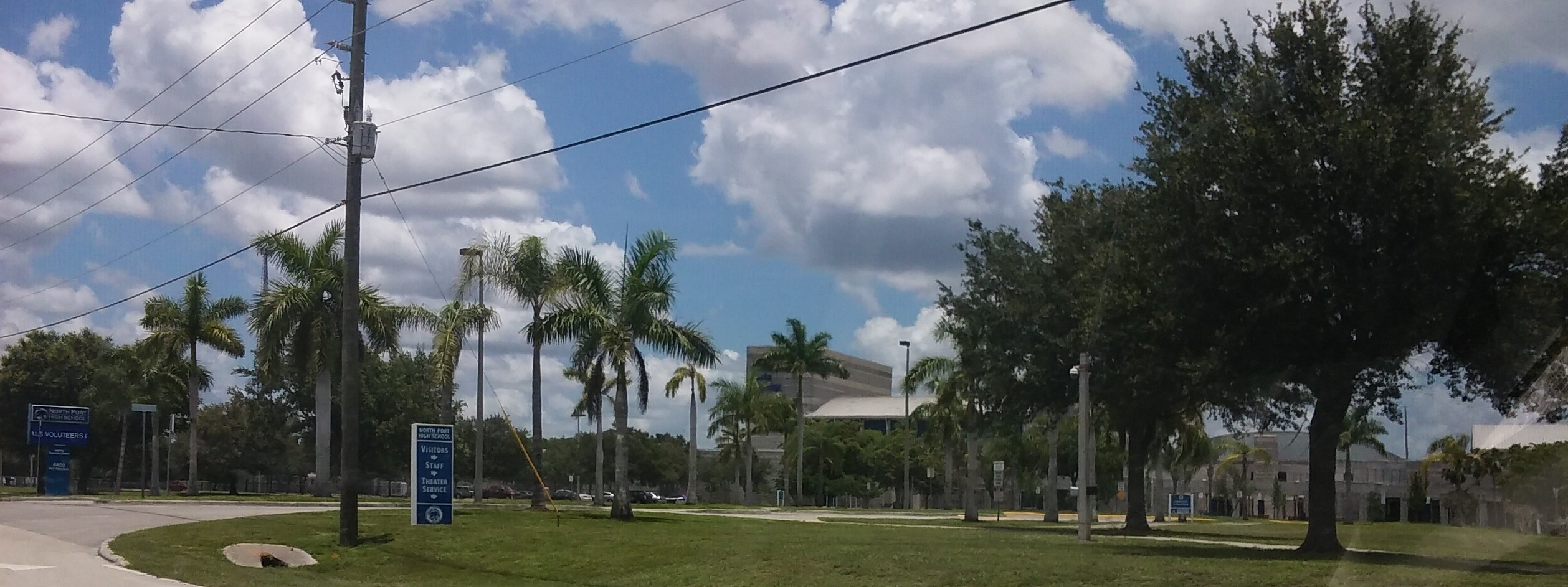
Entrance to North Port High School

== Education ==
North Port has five elementary schools, one public charter school (Imagine School at North Port), two middle schools, and one high school (North Port High School) operated by Sarasota County Public Schools. Suncoast Technical College is also in the city.
