= T. Mabry Carlton Reserve =

Preserve located in Sarasota County, Florida

T. Mabry Carlton, Jr. Memorial Reserve
- Carlton Reserve
- IUCN category V (protected landscape/seascape)
- Location within Florida
- Location: Sarasota County, Florida
- Nearest city: Venice, Florida
- Coordinates: 27°07′36″N 82°20′22″W
- Area: 24,565 acres (9,941 ha)
- Established: 1984
- Named for: Thomas Mabry Carlton
- Governing body: Sarasota County
- Website: Official website

T. Mabry Carlton, Jr. Memorial Reserve, also known as the Carlton Reserve, is a 24,565-acre (9,941 ha) preserve in Sarasota County, Florida. The reserve has 100 miles (160 km) of hiking, equestrian, and biking trails.

== History ==
In the 1920s, the Ringling brothers invested in large tracts of land within the eastern portion of Sarasota County. It was then bought by the MacArthur Foundation and subsequently known as the Ringling–MacArthur Tract or Ringling–MacArthur Reserve. A referendum approved by county voters on November 2, 1982, permitted the county to issue up to $30 million in general obligation bonds ($82.3 million in 2024 dollars) to purchase the land for a water wellfield along with conservation and recreational uses. The county initially purchased 16,074 acres (6,505 ha) of the land from MacArthur Foundation for $18.5 million in 1984. An additional 8,238 acres (3,334 ha) was purchased in 1987 for $4.9 million. Southwest Florida Water Management District (SWFWMD) purchased 8,249 acres (3,338 ha) through the state's "Save Our Rivers" program in 1994. A land swap between the water district and Sarasota County was done as part of the purchase and added 253 acres (102 ha) to the preserve.

The site is named in honor of Thomas Mabry Carlton Jr., a Sarasota County commissioner who had a critical role in acquiring the land. He died in a plane crash at his family ranch in 1989.

== Environment ==
Habitats in the preserve include dry prairie, pine flatwoods, mesic hammocks and seasonal wetlands. Wildlife on the land include white-tailed deer, wild turkey, bobcats, swallow-tailed kites, eastern diamondback rattlesnakes, and wading birds. The wildflowers pine lily, tarflower and Iris versicolor, the purple iris, have been identified on the property.

The park's 12-mile (19 km) Myakka Island Wilderness Trail connects the Carlton Reserve with Myakka River State Park, located north of the preserve. Approximately 6.5 miles (10.5 km) of the Myakka River abuts the reserve.

The preserve also connects east to the Big Slough Preserve and Myakkahatchee Creek Environmental Park through the South Powerline Trail.
