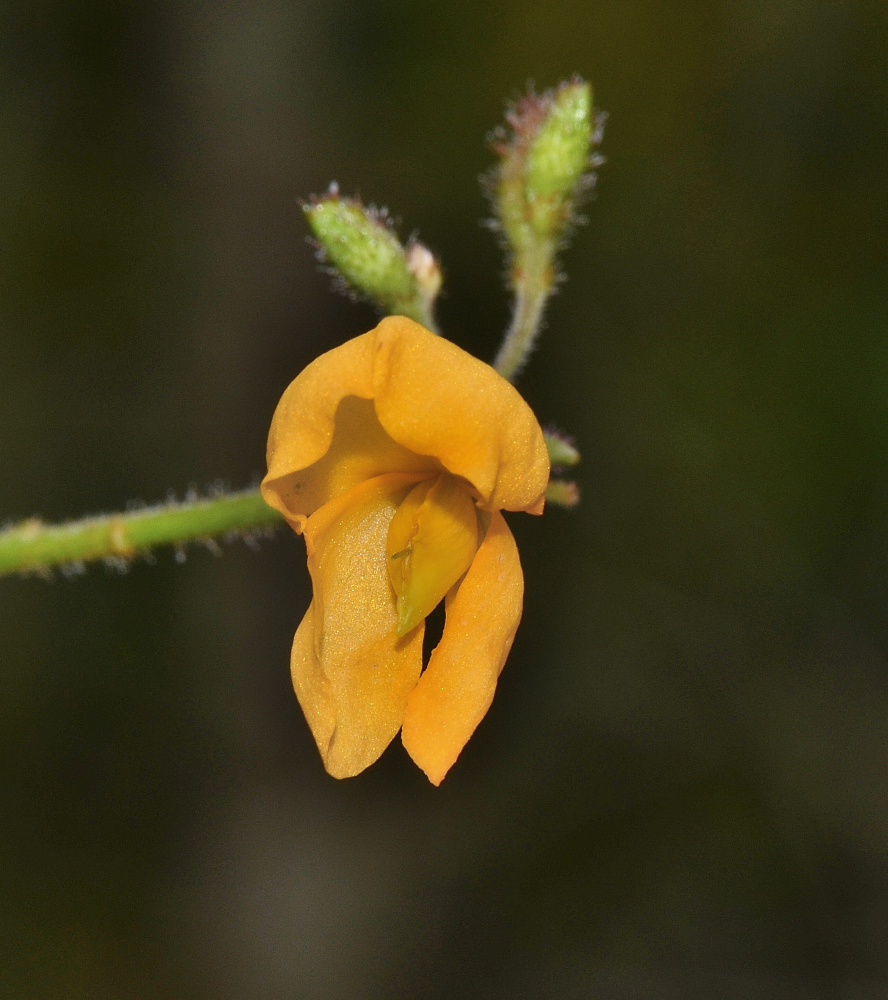

Conservation status
- Secure (NatureServe)

Scientific classification
- Kingdom: Plantae
- Clade: Tracheophytes
- Clade: Angiosperms
- Clade: Eudicots
- Clade: Rosids
- Order: Fabales
- Family: Fabaceae
- Subfamily: Faboideae
- Genus: Chapmannia
- Species: C. floridana

Binomial name
- Chapmannia floridana Torr. & A.Gray (1838)

= Chapmannia floridana =

Species of flowering plant

Chapmannia floridana, the Florida alicia or alicia, is a flowering plant endemic to peninsular Florida. A perennial, it grows to about 18 inches tall. It is in the Fabaceae (pea) family. It has orange-yellow flowers. It is a dicot.

Areas where it has been found include Frenchman's Forest Natural Area, Native Jupiter Ridge Natural Area, Seabranch Preserve State Park, and Myakka Headwaters Preserve.
