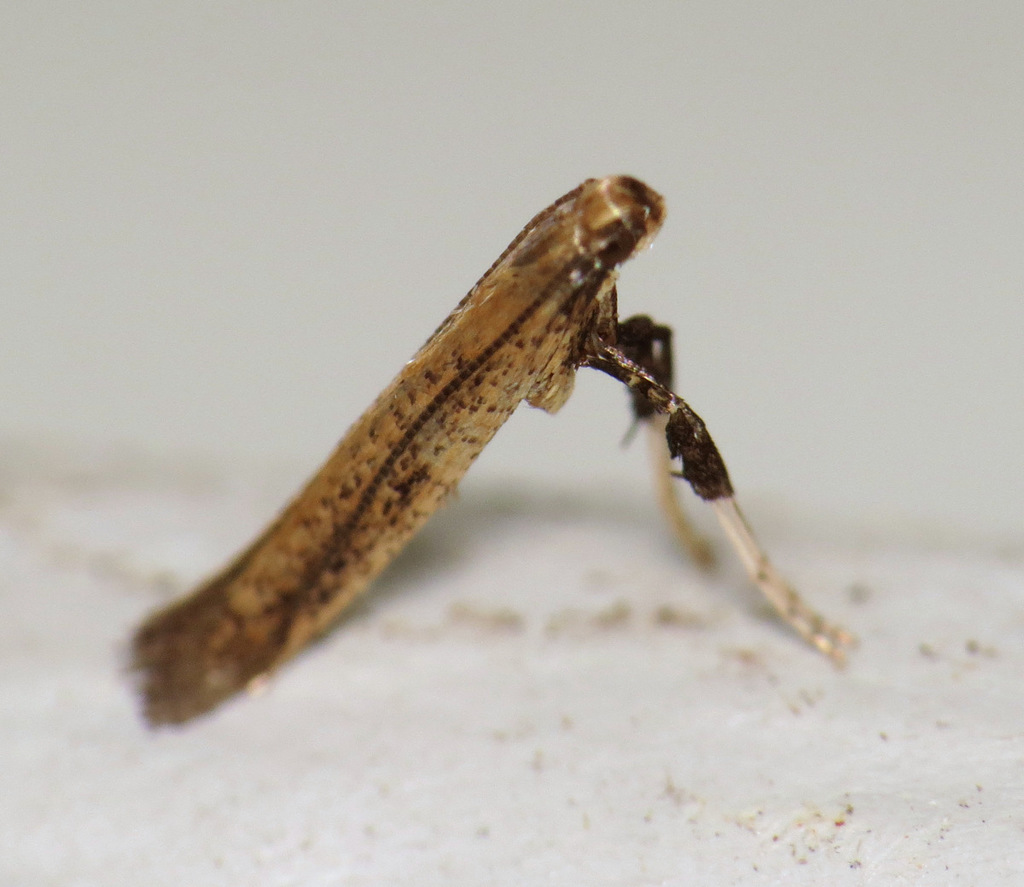

Scientific classification
- Kingdom: Animalia
- Phylum: Arthropoda
- Clade: Pancrustacea
- Class: Insecta
- Order: Lepidoptera
- Family: Gracillariidae
- Genus: Caloptilia
- Species: C. hypericella

Binomial name
- Caloptilia hypericella (Braun, 1918)

= Caloptilia hypericella =

Species of moth

Caloptilia hypericella is a moth of the family Gracillariidae. It is known from Canada (Québec) and the United States (Cincinnati, Ohio, Kentucky, Michigan and West Virginia).

The wingspan is about 8 mm.

The larvae feed on Hypericum cistifolium, Hypericum punctatum and Hypericum sphaerocarpum. They mine the leaves of their host plant.
