= Deer Prairie Creek Preserve =

Preserve located in Sarasota County, Florida

- IUCN category V (protected landscape/seascape)
- Location within Florida
- Location: Sarasota County, Florida
- Nearest city: North Port, Florida
- Coordinates: 27°05′N 82°18′W
- Area: 6,439 acres (2,606 ha)
- Governing body: Sarasota County
- Website: Official website

Deer Prairie Creek Preserve is a 6,439-acre (26.06 km^{2}) natural area with 70 miles (110 km) of trail in unincorporated Sarasota County, Florida, USA, around six miles (9.7 km) along the Myakka River.

== History ==
The land was acquired between 2000 and 2004 through a partnership between Sarasota County’s Environmentally Sensitive Lands Protection Program (ESLPP) and the Southwest Florida Water Management District (SWFWMD).

== Environment ==
Habitats include pine flatwoods, prairie hammock and seasonal wetlands. Animals living in the area include gopher tortoises, deer, alligators, river otter, wild turkey, swallow-tailed kite, Florida scrub-jays and wading birds. Notable plants growing in the preserve are St John's wort, tarflower and the pine lily (Lilium catesbaei), native to Florida. Equestrian uses are also allowed.

The park has two entrances. The northern entrance is located at 7001 Forbes Trail and the southern entrance at 10201 South Tamiami Trail.

The park has over 70 miles of Hiking Trails. There are also Bicycle Trails.
