= Jelks Preserve =

Nature preserve in Florida, United States

- IUCN category V (protected landscape/seascape)
- Location within Florida
- Interactive map of Jelks Preserve
- Location: Sarasota County, Florida
- Coordinates: 27.0915°N 82.33784°W
- Area: 614 acres (2.48 km^{2})
- Established: 1999
- Owner: Sarasota County

Jelks Preserve is a 614-acre (248 ha) natural preserve with 8 miles (13 km) of trail along the Myakka River in southern Sarasota County, Florida.

== History ==
The land was purchased in 1999 via the one percent county sales tax and a donation from the Jelks Family Foundation (namesake for the preserve). The habitat is riverine floodplain and includes live oak with epiphytes as well as Carolina jessamine and coralbean wildflowers. Wildlife include gopher tortoises, swallowtail butterflies, swallow-tailed kites, and song birds.

Mary Jelks gave an oral history in 2010 about herself, her family, and the park's history to an interviewer from New College.

== See also ==
- Southwest Florida Water Management District
- Myakka River State Park
