= Myakka River =

River in Florida, United States

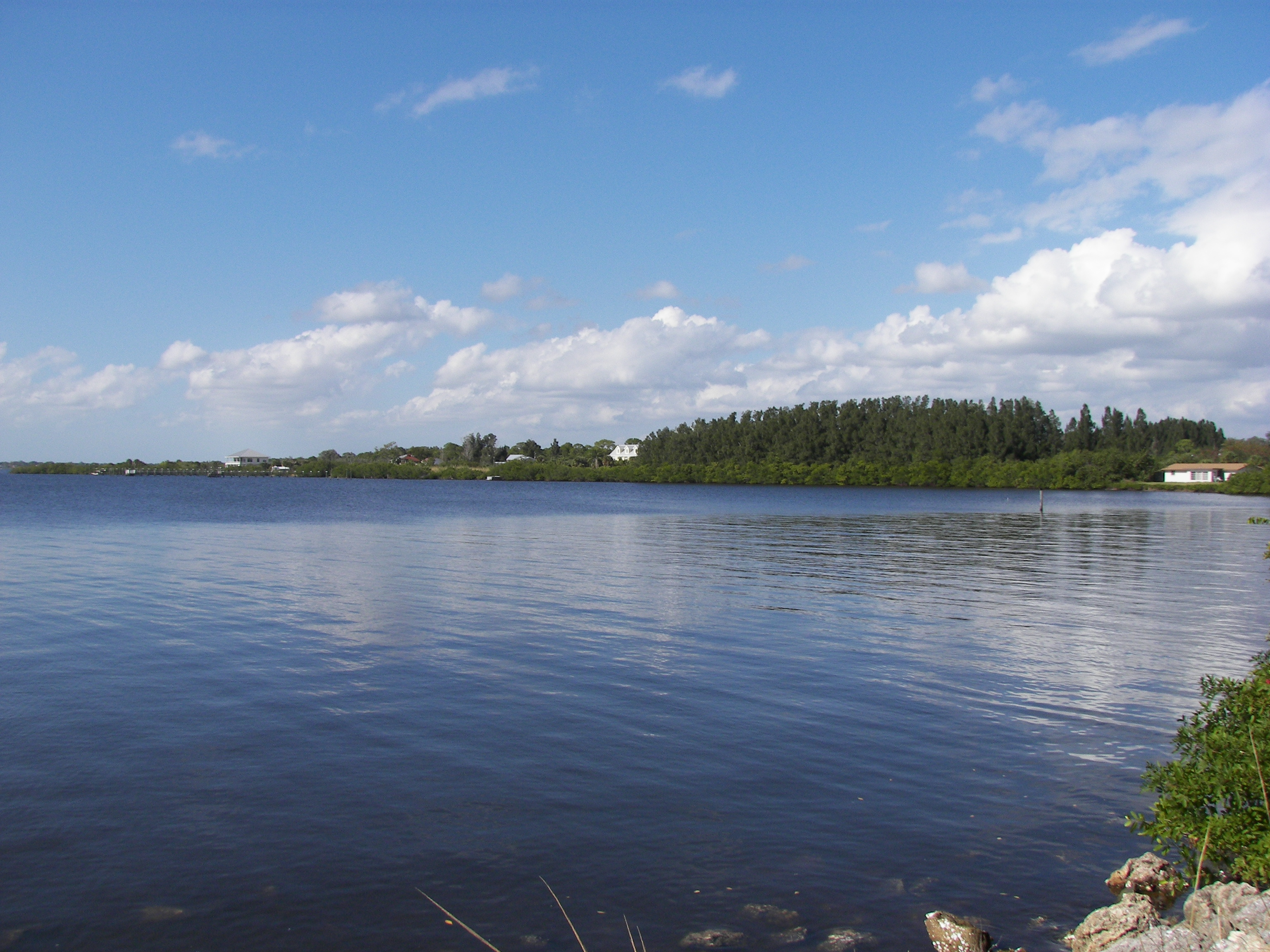
- Myakka River in El Jobean

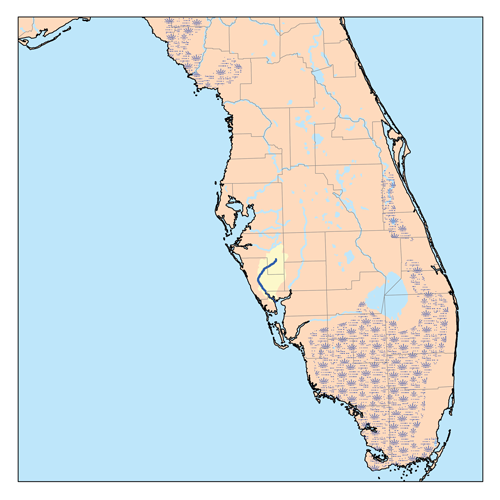
- Map of Myakka River in Florida
- Etymology: Mikasuki: Myakka (big water)

Location
- Country: United States
- State: Florida
- Counties: Manatee, Sarasota, Charlotte
- District: Southwest Florida Water Management District

Physical characteristics
- Mouth: Gulf of Mexico
  - location: Charlotte Harbor
  - coordinates: 26.9145°N 82.1643°W
- Length: 72 miles (116 km)
- Basin size: 314.7 square miles (815 km^{2})

Basin features
- River system: Myakka River Watershed
- Landmarks: Myakka River State Park, T. Mabry Carlton Reserve, Snook Haven, Deer Prairie Creek Preserve, Jelks Preserve, Myakka State Forest, Myakka Park
- Population: 72,317
- Waterbodies: Lake Myakka

The Myakka River is a river in southwestern Florida. It arises near the Hardee-Manatee county line at Myakka Head and flows southwest and then southeast through Manatee, Sarasota and Charlotte counties to Charlotte Harbor, an arm of the Gulf of Mexico. The river is 72 miles (116 km) long and has a drainage basin of 602 square miles (1559.2 km^{2}), of which 314.7 square miles (815 km^{2}) lies in Sarasota county. The last 20 miles (32 km) of the river is tidal and brackish.

The Myakka River remains relatively undeveloped. A 12-mile (19 km) stretch of the river is preserved in Myakka River State Park. A 34-mile (55 km) portion of the river in Sarasota County (including all of the park) was designated as a state Wild and Scenic River in 1985 by the Florida Legislature. Portions of the water basin, however, have been altered by canals. In 2022, the river flooding during Hurricane Ian resulted in the temporary closing of 14 miles of Interstate 75 near Port Charlotte.

== Tributaries ==
- Myakkahatchee Creek

== See also ==
- Deer Prairie Creek Preserve
