= Chapmannia reghidensis =

Conservation status
- Endangered (IUCN 3.1)

Scientific classification
- Kingdom: Plantae
- Clade: Tracheophytes
- Clade: Angiosperms
- Clade: Eudicots
- Clade: Rosids
- Order: Fabales
- Family: Fabaceae
- Subfamily: Faboideae
- Genus: Chapmannia
- Species: C. reghidensis

Binomial name
- Chapmannia reghidensis Thulin & McKean

Species of legume

Chapmannia reghidensis is a species of flowering plant in the family Fabaceae. It is endemic to northern Socotra in Yemen. Its natural habitat is subtropical or tropical dry forests. It is threatened by habitat loss.
