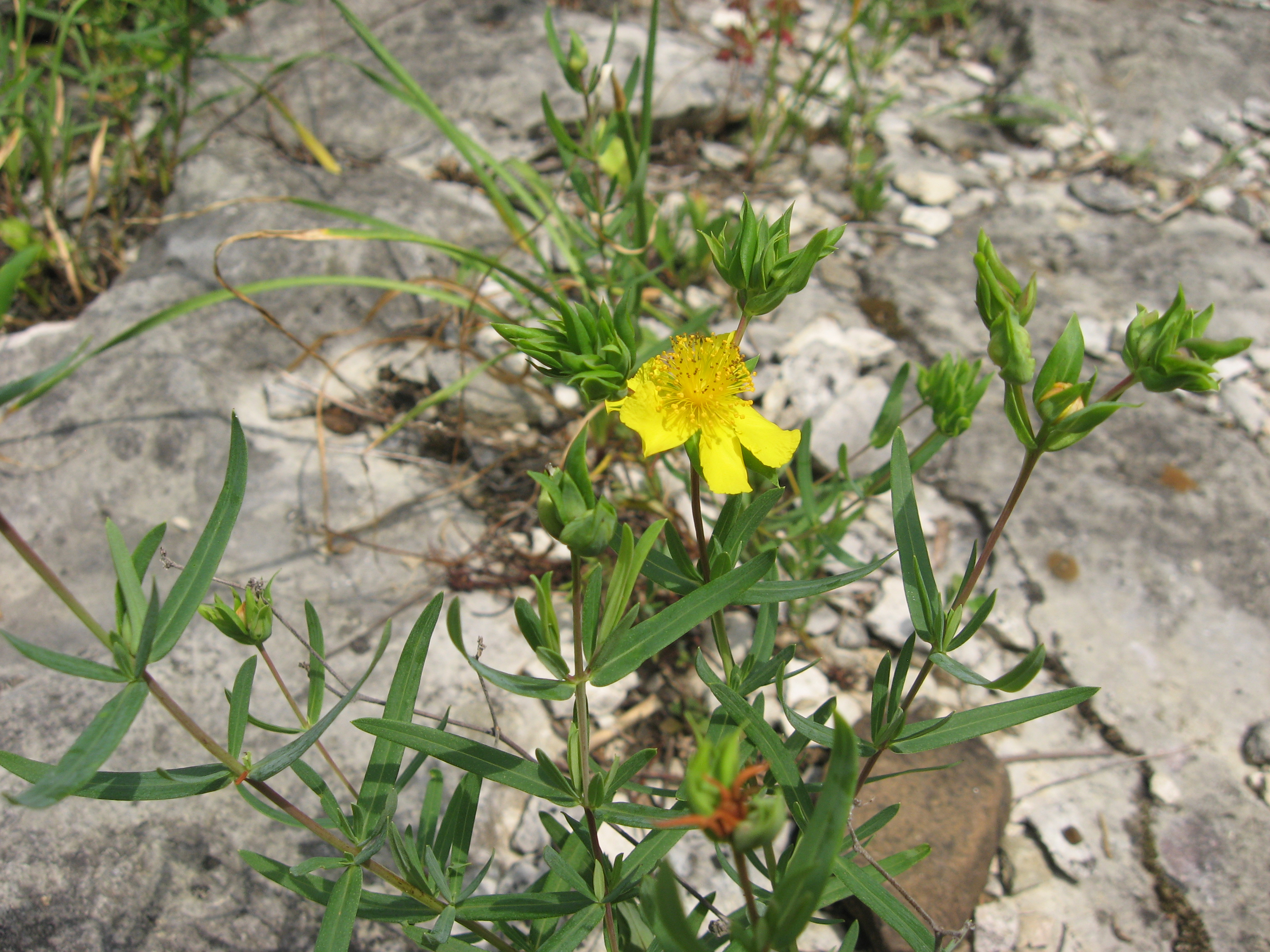

Scientific classification
- Kingdom: Plantae
- Clade: Tracheophytes
- Clade: Angiosperms
- Clade: Eudicots
- Clade: Rosids
- Order: Malpighiales
- Family: Hypericaceae
- Genus: Hypericum
- Section: H. sect. Myriandra
- Subsection: H. subsect. Brathydium
- Species: H. dolabriforme

Binomial name
- Hypericum dolabriforme Vent

= Hypericum dolabriforme =

Species of flowering plant in the St John's wort family

Hypericum dolabriforme, the straggling St. Johnswort or glade St. John's-wort, is a species of flowering plant in the St. John's wort family Hypericaceae native to the United States.

== Description ==
It is a semi-woody perennial that produces yellow flowers in the summer. It is distinguished from the similar Hypericum sphaerocarpum by having unequal sepals and over one hundred stamens.

== Distribution and habitat ==
Hypericum dolabriforme is native to the Southeastern United States where it is found in calcareous glades. It has a small native range, being found primarily in Kentucky and Tennessee with range extensions into northern Alabama and Georgia and southern Indiana.
