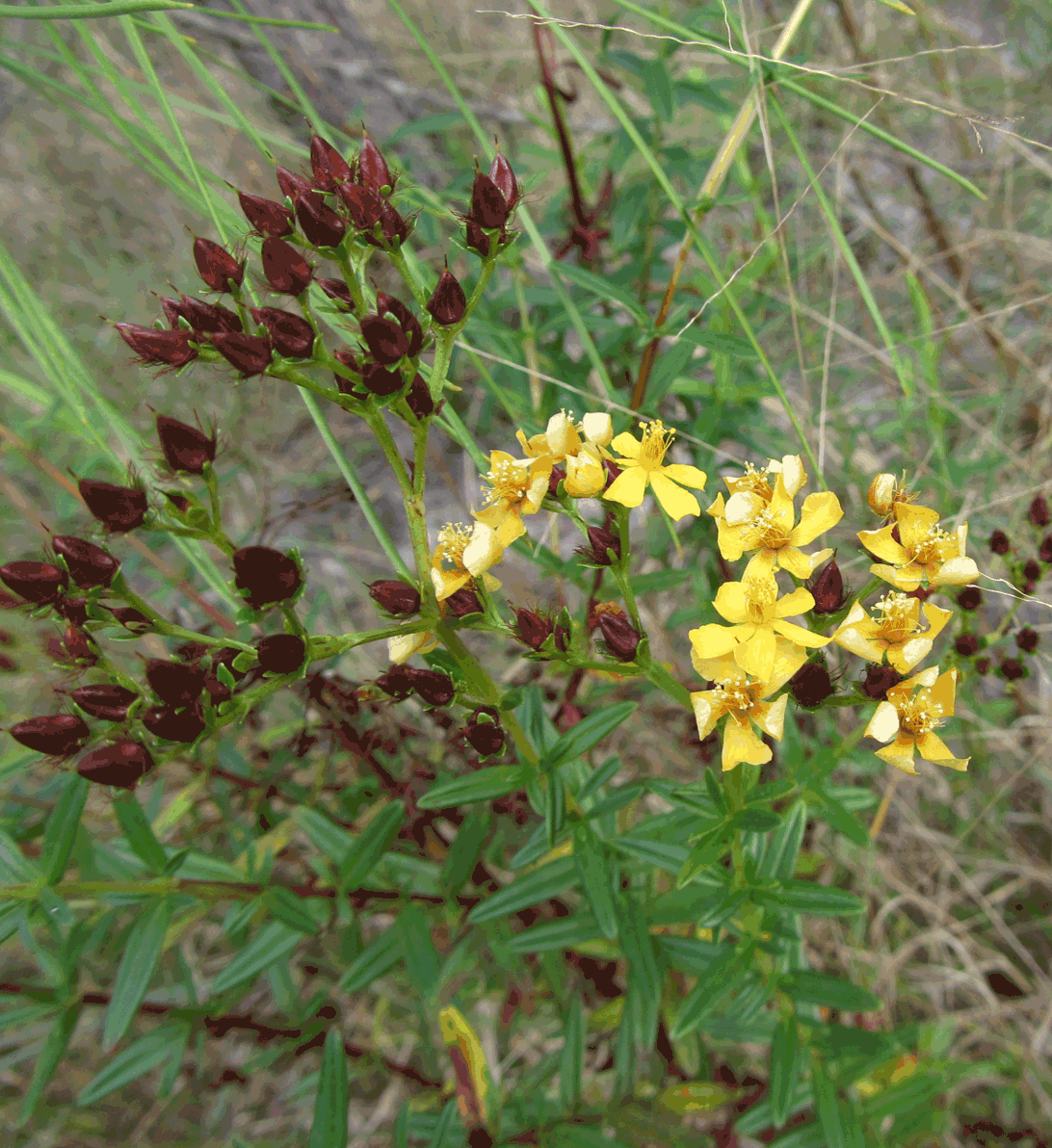

Scientific classification
- Kingdom: Plantae
- Clade: Embryophytes
- Clade: Tracheophytes
- Clade: Spermatophytes
- Clade: Angiosperms
- Clade: Eudicots
- Clade: Rosids
- Order: Malpighiales
- Family: Hypericaceae
- Genus: Hypericum
- Species: H. cistifolium

Binomial name
- Hypericum cistifolium Lam

= Hypericum cistifolium =

Species of plant

Hypericum cistifolium is a shrub in the family Hypericaceae native in the southeastern United States. Plants in the genus Hypericum are referred to as St. John's wort.

== Description ==
Hypericum cistifolium is a shrub that grows 0.2-0.9 meters in height. It has simple, opposite, sessile leaves with entire margins that are oblong to lanceolate in shape. Its yellow flowers can be found from June to August and have 5 petals.

== Distribution and habitat ==
Hypericum cistifolium is found from eastern North Carolina south to South Florida and west to eastern Texas. It grows in pine savannas and wet pine flatwoods.

== Ecology ==
Hypericum cistifolium is insect pollinated and is recorded to have been visited in northern Florida by Megachile mendica.
