= Chapmannia tinireana =

Conservation status
- Endangered (IUCN 3.1)

Scientific classification
- Kingdom: Plantae
- Clade: Tracheophytes
- Clade: Angiosperms
- Clade: Eudicots
- Clade: Rosids
- Order: Fabales
- Family: Fabaceae
- Subfamily: Faboideae
- Genus: Chapmannia
- Species: C. tinireana

Binomial name
- Chapmannia tinireana Thulin

Species of legume

Chapmannia tinireana is a species of flowering plant in the family Fabaceae. It is endemic to north-central Socotra in Yemen. Its natural habitat is subtropical or tropical dry forests. It is threatened by habitat loss.
