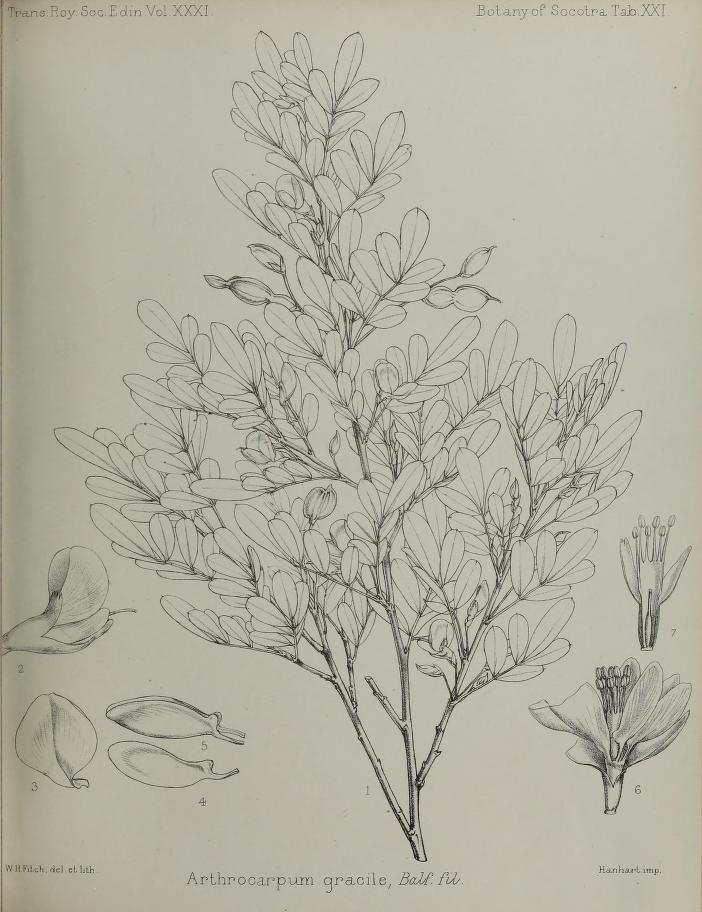

Conservation status
- Near Threatened (IUCN 3.1)

Scientific classification
- Kingdom: Plantae
- Clade: Tracheophytes
- Clade: Angiosperms
- Clade: Eudicots
- Clade: Rosids
- Order: Fabales
- Family: Fabaceae
- Subfamily: Faboideae
- Genus: Chapmannia
- Species: C. gracilis

Binomial name
- Chapmannia gracilis (Balf.f.) Thulin

Synonyms
- Arthrocarpum gracile Balf.f. Diphaca gracilis (Balf.f.) Taub. Ormocarpum gracile (Balf.f.) Harms

= Chapmannia gracilis =

Species of plant

Chapmannia gracilis is a species of flowering plant in the family Fabaceae. It is endemic to north-central and northeastern Socotra in Yemen. Its natural habitat is subtropical or tropical dry forests.
