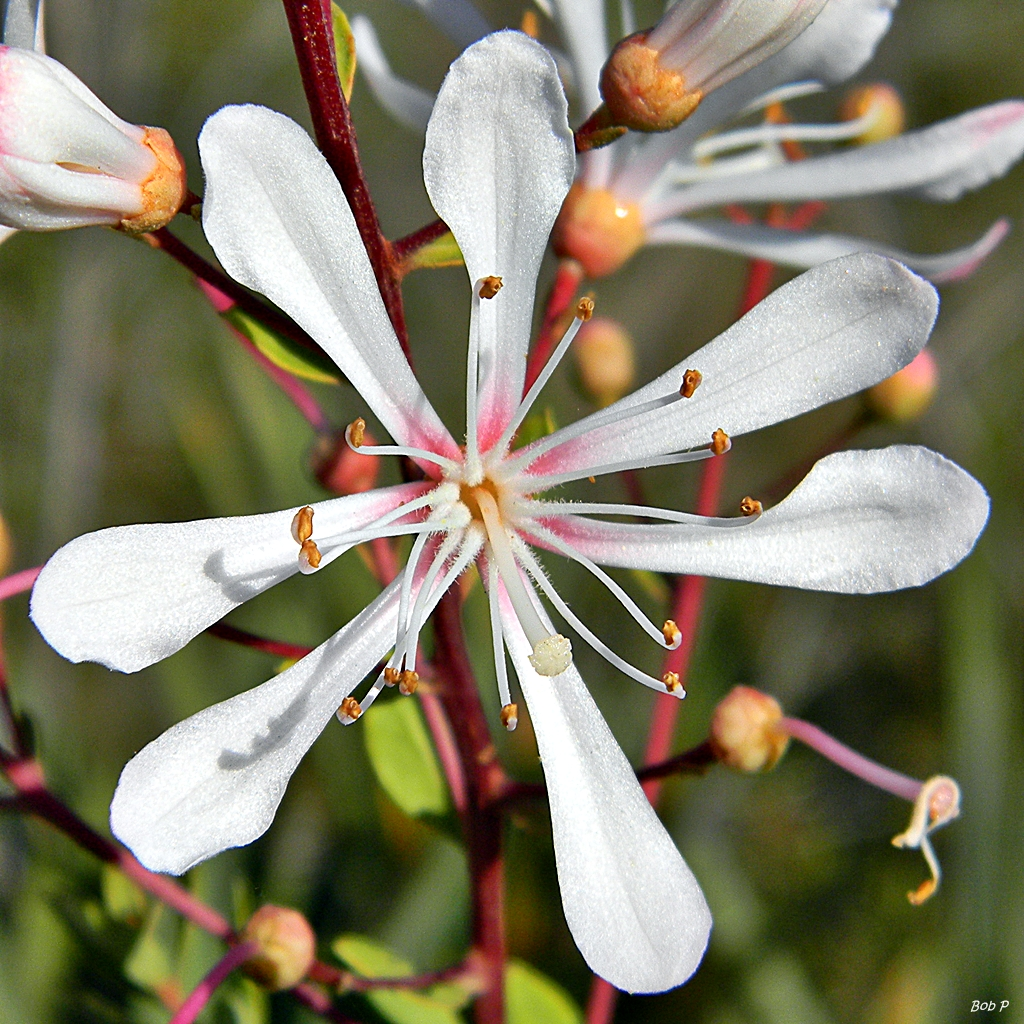

Conservation status
- Secure (NatureServe)

Scientific classification
- Kingdom: Plantae
- Clade: Tracheophytes
- Clade: Angiosperms
- Clade: Eudicots
- Clade: Asterids
- Order: Ericales
- Family: Ericaceae
- Genus: Bejaria
- Species: B. racemosa

Binomial name
- Bejaria racemosa Vent.

= Bejaria racemosa =

Species of flowering plant

Bejaria racemosa, commonly known as tarflower, is a woody shrub with a fragrant flower found in the southeastern US states of Florida, Georgia, and Alabama. It grows on flatlands in groups. Insects become trapped on its flowers due to the sticky secretions found there.

== Description ==
Tarflower is an evergreen shrub growing up to 2.5m tall. Its few erect branches support powdery-pubescent stems with simple, alternate, sessile leaves. Leaves are elliptic to ovate in shape and 2–6 cm long and 2 cm wide. Their margin is entire, the leaf tip is rounded to acute, and the leaf base is cuneate. The adaxial (upper) leaf surface is covered in powdery pubescence, while the abaxial (bottom) surface is whitish in color with long hairs along the midrib.

The flowers of Bejaria racemosa are fragrant and sticky with seven distinctly separated petals, white to pinkish in color and 2–3 cm long. Flowers are bisexual, having rust-colored anthers and a persistent pistil on the capsule as it develops and matures.1 The glandular inner surface of the calyx produces copious nectar, giving the flowers and fruits a sticky texture. The fruit is a capsule 6-8mm in diameter.

== Etymology ==
The common name 'tarflower' and 'fly-catcher' refer to the sticky flowers and fruits, upon which insects are trapped.

The genus Bejaria is named in honor of a professor of Botany from Cadiz, José Bejar. The name was given by a botanist named Mutis, who sent the first described specimen of the genus from Colombia to Linnaeus in 1761.

The species epithet 'racemosa' refers to the elongated raceme inflorescence of the species, which differentiates it from other species in the genus. Raceme comes from the latin 'racemosus' meaning full of clusters or clustering.

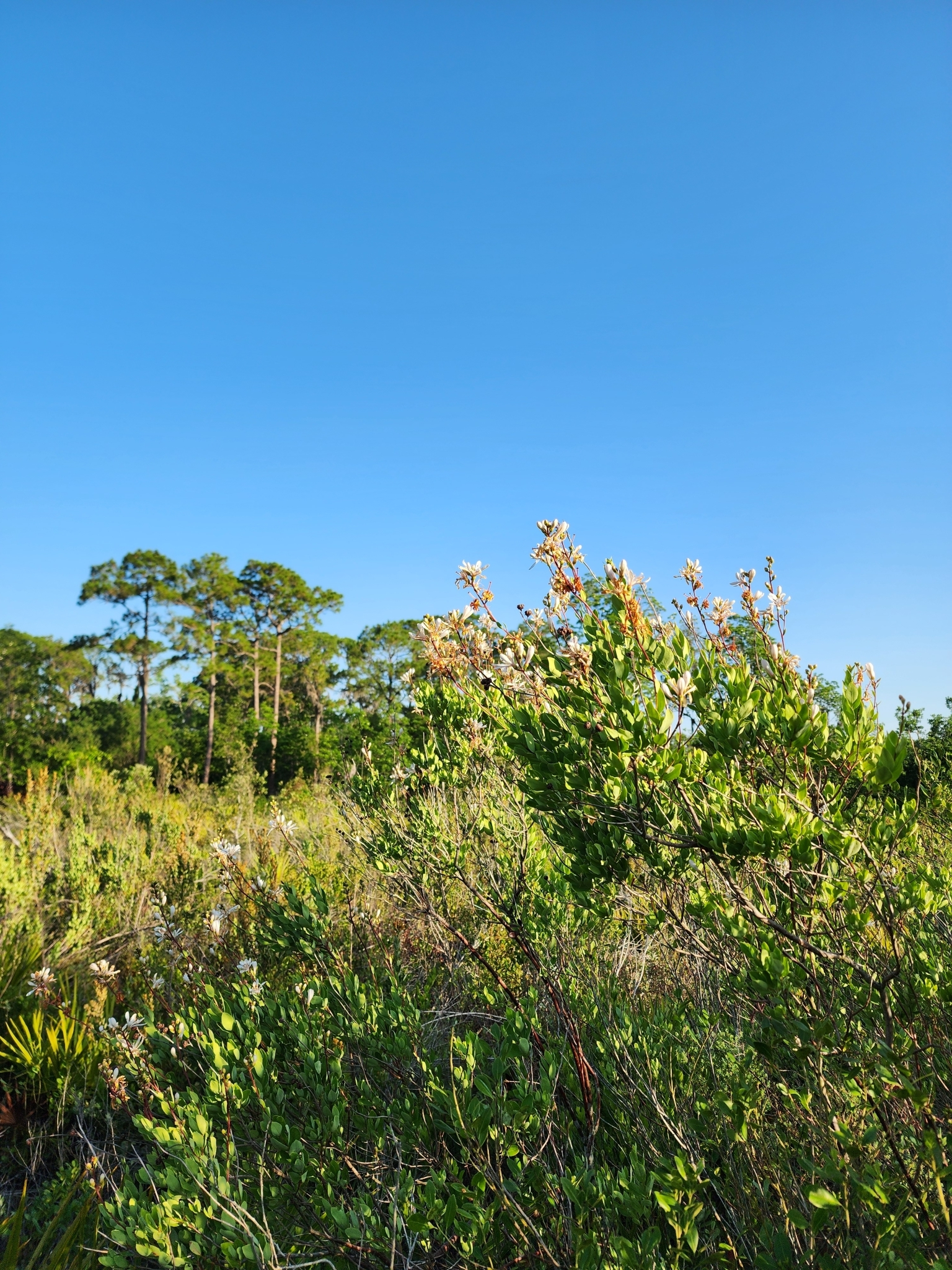
Specimen growing in mesic flatwoods

== Habitat and Ecology ==
The Tarflower inhabits scrub ecosystems, mesic flatwoods, and coastal pinelands. Scrub ecosystems are characterized by well-drained, nutrient poor sandy soils. The plants inhabiting this ecosystem are adapted to survive in the harsh conditions created by exposure to the sun and rapid draining of water and nutrients into the sandy soil. It has been suggested that B. racemosa acts as a facultative insectivore by trapping and killing insects in its sticky resin, later benefiting from a supplementation of nitrogenous decay products.

Bees and flies are attracted to the blooms, and often become entrapped in the sticky resin. Native bee visitors documented include sweat, resin, leaf cutter, and bumblebees. Bee species were documented at Archbold Biological Station, these include: Agapostemon splendens, Augochlorella aurata, A. gratiosa, Augochloropsis sumptuosa, Anthidiellum perplexum, Anthidium maculifrons, Megachile brevis pseudobrevis, M. mendica, M. petulans, Bombus impatiens and B. pennsylvanicus.

B. racemosa is also a host plant for Southern Emerald moth. Larvae feeding on tarflowers were found to resemble in color the rust-colored anthers and stems, while those that fed on other host plants exhibited different coloration. The same study found that Southern Emerald moth larvae developed at a slower rate on B. racemosa compared with other host plants, perhaps as a consequence of the sticky resin produced by the flowers.

== Distribution ==
The range of Bejaria racemosa spans from the southern Florida counties of Dade, Lee, and Highlands north to Camden, Worth, and Glynn counties in Georgia.

== Taxonomy ==
B. racemosa was first described in 1800 by Ventenat and collected by Michaux.

== Cultivation & Culture ==
B. racemosa is used in Florida native landscaping. It is valued for its drought tolerance and fragrant showy flowers in the spring/summer. It can be propagated by seed or cutting. It can be grown in areas with full sun to part shade and prefers sandy, well drained soils. However, Tarflower does not tolerate salty wind or direct salt spray.

The Florida Native Plant Society's Orange county chapter is named after the Tarflower.

== Gallery ==
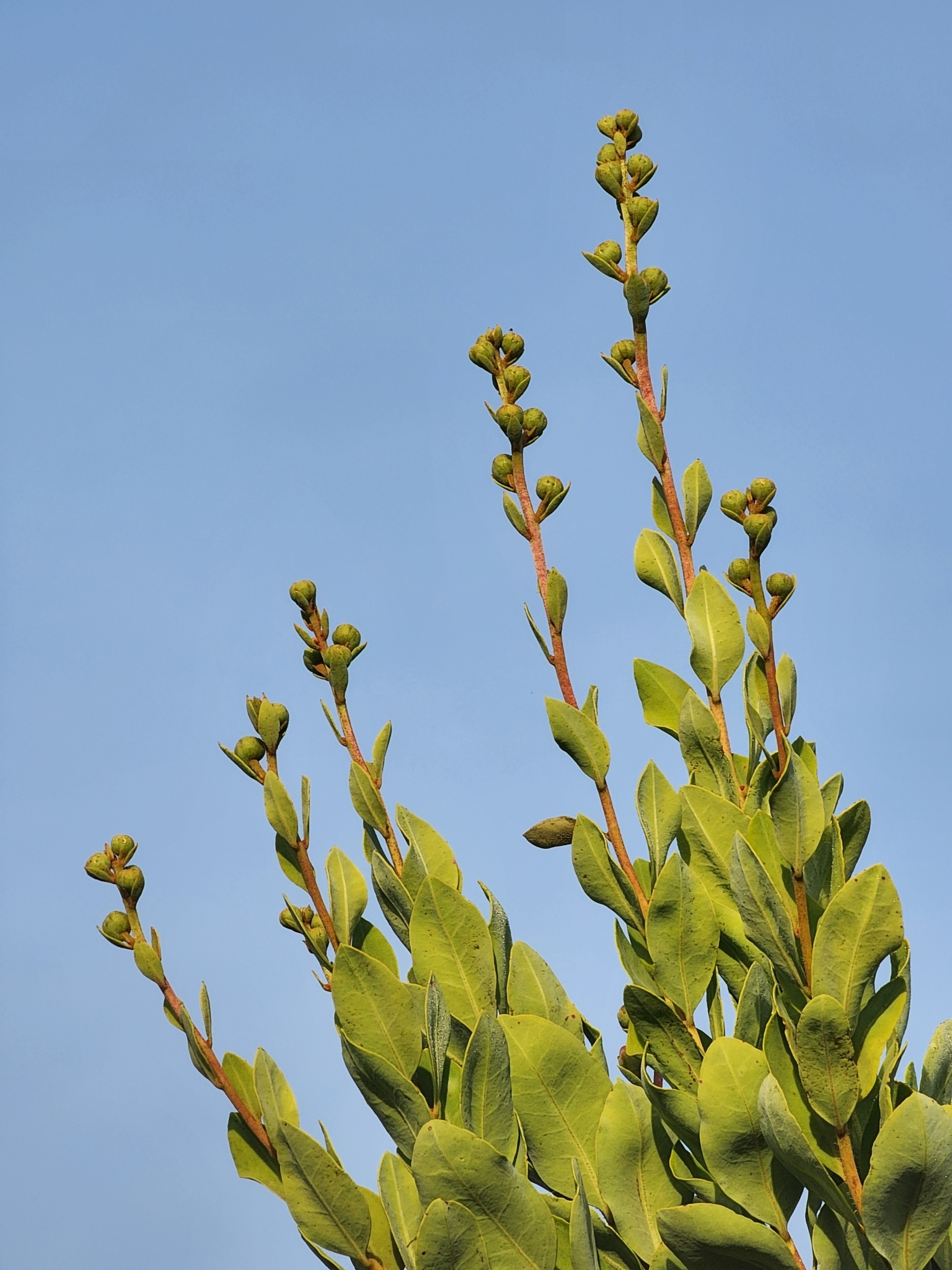
Budding specimen displaying sparse, erect branching habit

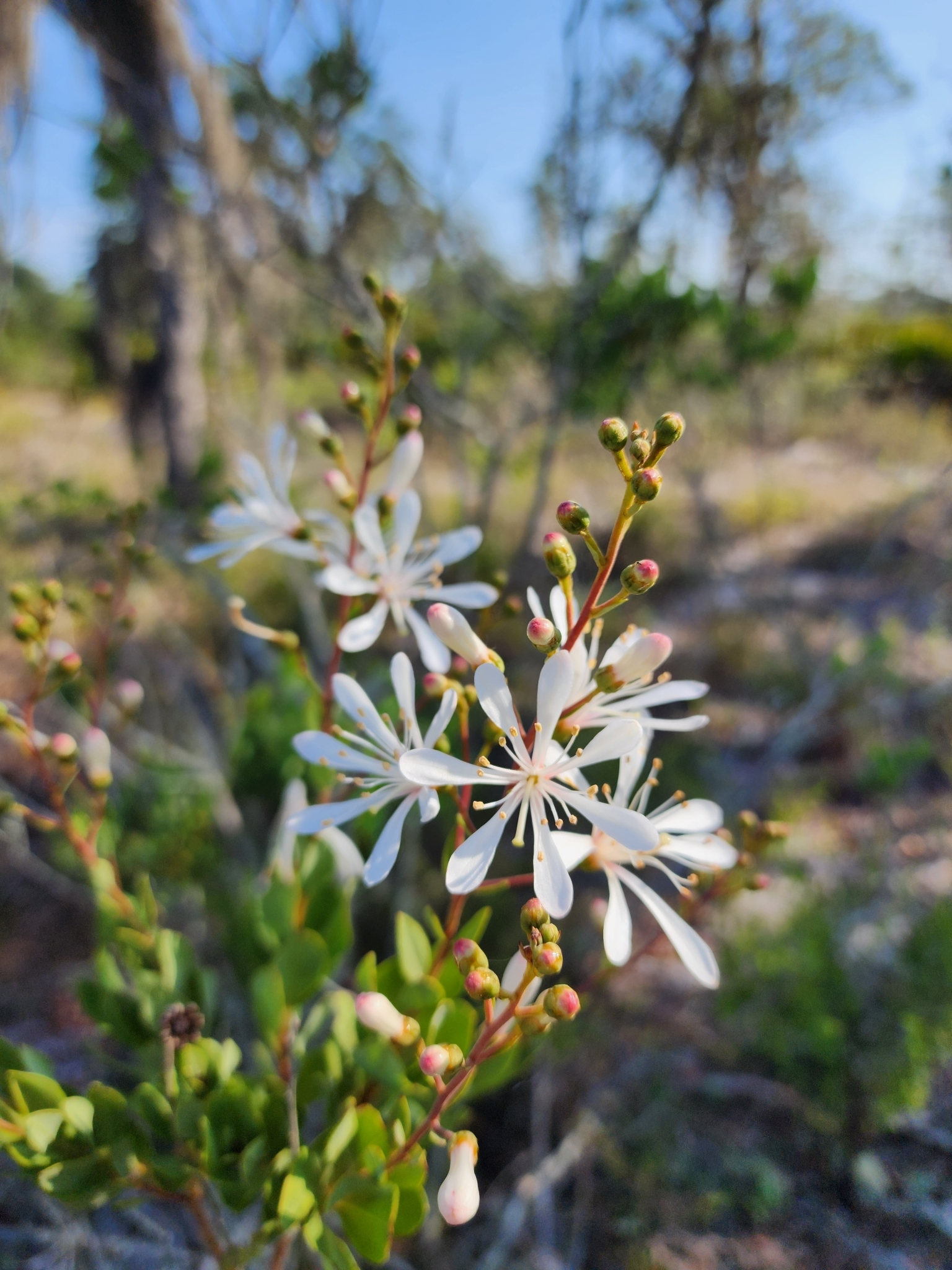
Flowers and buds of specimen growing in Florida scrub

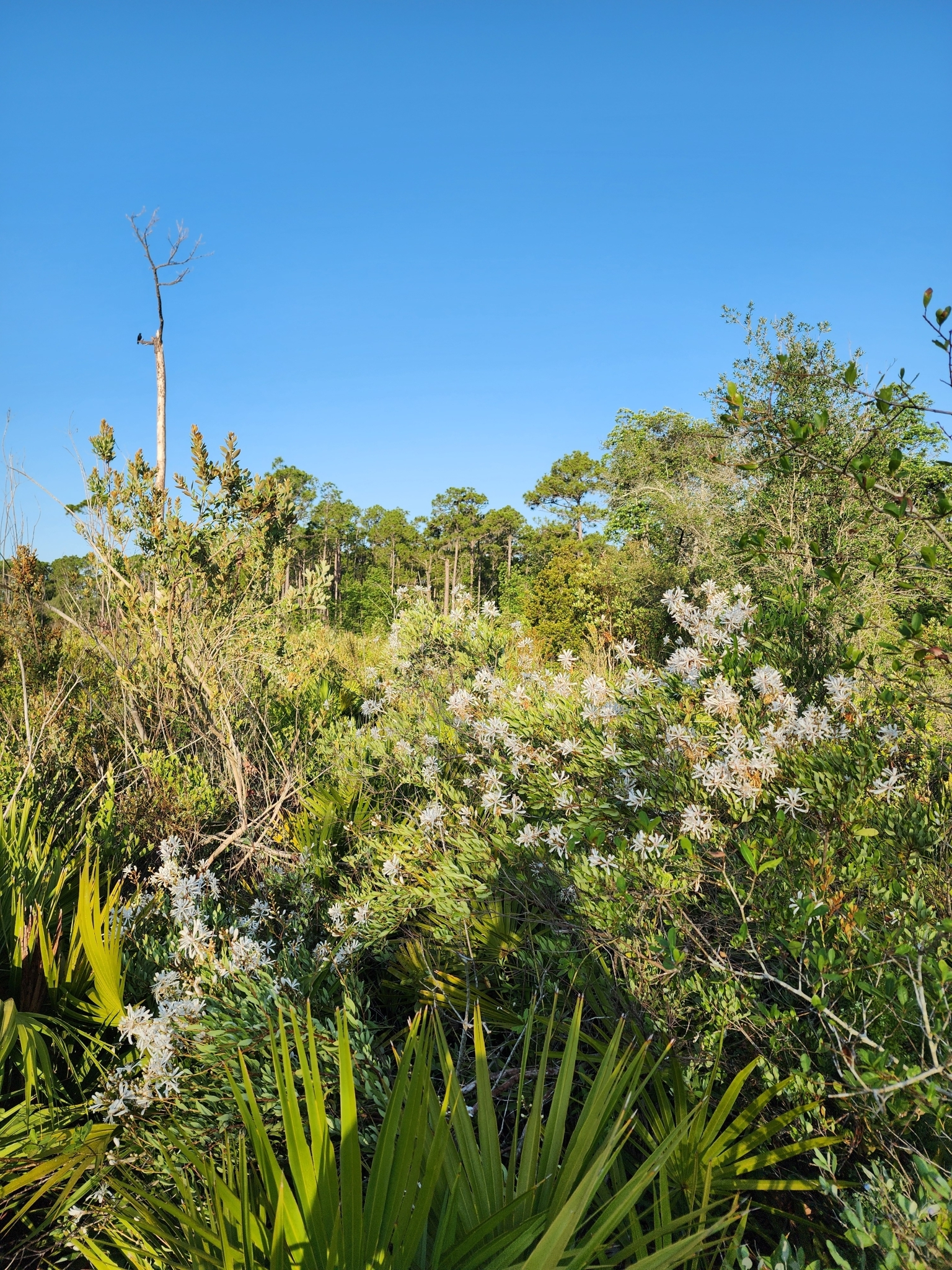
Thicket of Bejaria racemosa in a mesic flatwood
