= Myakka Headwaters Preserve =

Conservation area in Florida, United States

Coordinates: 27.3706°N 82.1505°W

Myakka Headwaters Preserve is a 432-acre parcel of conservation lands being restored by the Conservation Foundation of the Gulf Coast in Florida. The group has planted pop ash, Carolina willow and long leaf pine to help restore the property. The original parcel of 363 acres was acquired in 2020 and additional land added in 2022 to bring the property up to 432 acres. It is next to Flatford Swamp and contains tupelo and red maple as well as orchids and airplants such as the Myakka River airplant (tillandsia simulata) and lowland loosestrife, a Florida endemic species. The Foundation offers tours and restoration events at the property. The foundation posted a video discussing the property and some of the trees and birds on it including wood storks, Great egret, and white ibis.
