= Chapmannia sericea =

Conservation status
- Near Threatened (IUCN 3.1)

Scientific classification
- Kingdom: Plantae
- Clade: Tracheophytes
- Clade: Angiosperms
- Clade: Eudicots
- Clade: Rosids
- Order: Fabales
- Family: Fabaceae
- Subfamily: Faboideae
- Genus: Chapmannia
- Species: C. sericea

Binomial name
- Chapmannia sericea Thulin & McKean

Species of legume

Chapmannia sericea is a species of flowering plant in the family Fabaceae. It is endemic to western and southwestern Socotra in Yemen. Its natural habitat is rocky areas.
