= Chapmannia =

Scientific classification
- Kingdom: Plantae
- Clade: Tracheophytes
- Clade: Angiosperms
- Clade: Eudicots
- Clade: Rosids
- Order: Fabales
- Family: Fabaceae
- Subfamily: Faboideae
- Tribe: Dalbergieae
- Genus: Chapmannia; Torr. & A.Gray

Type species
- Chapmannia floridana Torr. & A.Gray (1839)

Species
- See text
- Range of the genus Chapmannia. (The red arrow is pointing to the island of Socotra.)

Synonyms
- Arthrocarpum Balf.f. (1882); Pachecoa Standl. & Steyerm. (1943)

Genus of legumes

Chapmannia is a genus of flowering plants in the family Fabaceae. It contains seven species with a scattered distribution – Mexico, Guatemala, Florida, and Venezuela in the Americas, and Somalia and Socotra in eastern Africa. The genus was recently assigned to the informal monophyletic Pterocarpus clade of the Dalbergieae.

== Species ==
Chapmannia comprises the following species:

- Chapmannia floridana Torr. & A. Gray – Florida
- Chapmannia gracilis (Balf. f.) Thulin – north-central and northeastern Socotra
- Chapmannia prismatica (Sessé & Moc.) Thulin – eastern, central, and southwestern Mexico, Guatemala, and north-central Venezuela
- Chapmannia reghidensis Thulin – northern Socotra
- Chapmannia sericea Thulin – western and southwestern Socotra
- Chapmannia somalensis (Hillc. & J.B. Gillett) Thulin – central Somalia
- Chapmannia tinireana Thulin – north-central Somalia
