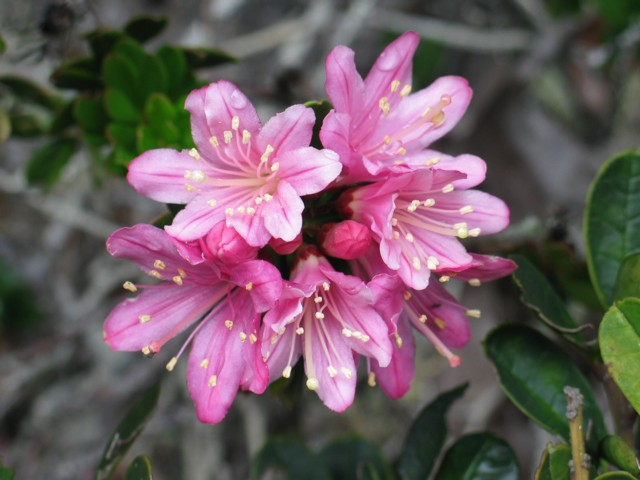
- Bejaria imthurnii

Scientific classification
- Kingdom: Plantae
- Clade: Tracheophytes
- Clade: Angiosperms
- Clade: Eudicots
- Clade: Asterids
- Order: Ericales
- Family: Ericaceae
- Genus: Bejaria; Mutis (1771), nom. cons.

Synonyms
- Acunna Ruiz & Pav. (1794); Befaria Mutis ex L. (1771); Jurgensenia Turcz. (1847)

= Bejaria =

Genus of flowering plants

Bejaria is a genus of flowering plants belonging to the family Ericaceae.

Its native range is the tropical and subtropical Americas, from the southeastern United States and Mexico to Bolivia and northern Brazil.

== Species ==
There are 15 species assigned to this genus:

- Bejaria aestuans Mutis
- Bejaria cubensis Griseb.
- Bejaria imthurnii N.E.Br.
- Bejaria infundibula Clemants
- Bejaria ledifolia Bonpl.
- Bejaria mathewsii Fielding & Gardner
- Bejaria nana A.C.Sm. & Ewan
- Bejaria neblinensis Maguire, Steyerm. & Luteyn
- Bejaria racemosa Vent.
- Bejaria resinosa Mutis ex L.f.
- Bejaria sprucei Meisn.
- Bejaria steyermarkii A.C.Sm.
- Bejaria subsessilis Benth.
- Bejaria tachirensis A.C.Sm.
- Bejaria zamorae S.E.Clemants
