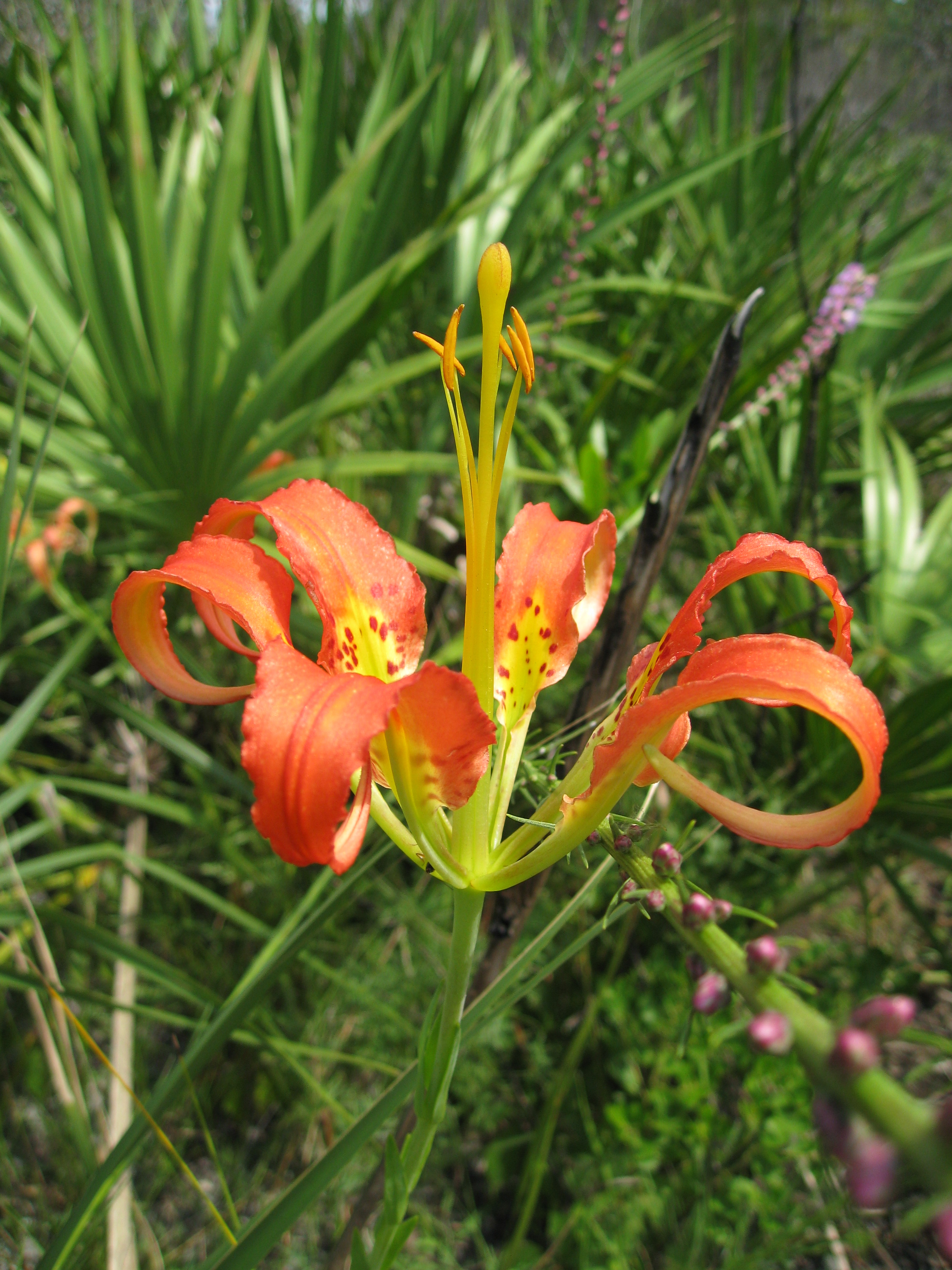

Conservation status
- Apparently Secure (NatureServe)

Scientific classification
- Kingdom: Plantae
- Clade: Tracheophytes
- Clade: Angiosperms
- Clade: Monocots
- Order: Liliales
- Family: Liliaceae
- Subfamily: Lilioideae
- Genus: Lilium
- Species: L. catesbaei

Binomial name
- Lilium catesbaei Walter 1788 not Kunth 1843 (syn of L. pensylvanicum)

Synonyms
- Lilium spectabile Salisb.; Lilium carolinianum Bosc ex Lam.

= Lilium catesbaei =

Species of lily

Lilium catesbaei, commonly known as Catesby's lily, pine lily, leopard lily, tiger lily, or southern-red lily is a species of lily native to the coastal plain of the American Southeast, from southeast Virginia to Florida, and west to Louisiana.

The species epithet is named after the English botanist Mark Catesby, who collected plants in the Southeastern United States in the early 18th Century.

== Description ==
L. catesbaei is a perennial plant reaching 0.9 m in height (3.0 ft), emerging from an ovoid bulb, 1.6–2.5 cm long (0.63–0.98 in) by 1.3–2.4 cm wide (0.51–0.94 in).

The single, terminal flower is upright with 6 tepals (petals and sepals that look very similar), 7.6–11.1 cm long (3.0–4.4 in). The reflexed tepals are crimson-orange toward the tip, with nectar guides toward the base that are yellow with maroon or magenta spots. The stamens are moderately exserted, running parallel to the pale green style. The anthers are 0.4–1.6 cm long (0.16–0.63 in) and covered in burnt orange or dark tan pollen. The single pistil is 7.6–10.5 cm long (3.0–4.1 in) with an ovary 1.4–3.5 cm long (0.55–1.38 in). The whole flower sits on a pedicel 1.8–9.5 cm long (0.71–3.74 in).

The fruit is a capsule, often ridged along the margins, 2.2–5.3 cm long (0.87–2.09 in) by 0.8–1.6 cm wide (0.31–0.63 in).

This species has the largest flower of any native North American lily. In small plants, the weight of the flower sometimes topples the slender stem. It generally blooms from late June to October in most of its range, though in the Florida Peninsula it may sporadically bloom in spring and fall.

The seeds have a high rate of viability (90-95%) after they are released. In cultivation under ideal conditions, plants may grow from seed to flower in a single year. In habitat, this usually take 2-3 years.

It requires hot, wet, acidic soil inhospitable to most other lily species.

== Ecology ==
L. catesbaei is adapted to frequent fires, blooming more conspicuously post-fire. Wildfire suppression is a factor leading to the species' decline in many areas.

The primary pollinator of L. catesbaei is the Palamedes swallowtail. Spicebush swallowtails also visit the flowers, though their smaller size may make them less effective pollinators.

== Conservation Status ==
L. catesbaei is designated by NatureServe as an apparently secure (G4) species globally. However, this status was last reviewed in 1988, meaning it may not reflect the current state of the species. In Louisiana and Virginia, it is a critically imperiled species, where habitat destruction and fire suppression pose significant threats to existing populations. In 2010 it was designated as a threatened species in Florida but has since had that status revoked. The table below lists the subnational conservation status in each U.S. state the species is present.

Subnational Conservation Statuses by State
Subnational Rank	U.S. State
Critically Imperiled (S1)	Louisiana, Virginia
Vulnerable (S3)	North Carolina, South Carolina
Vulnerable/Apparently Secure (S3S4)	Alabama, Mississippi
Apparently Secure (S4)	Florida
No Status Rank (SNR)	Georgia

== See also ==
- Deer Prairie Creek Preserve in Florida, notable for Lilium catesbaei
