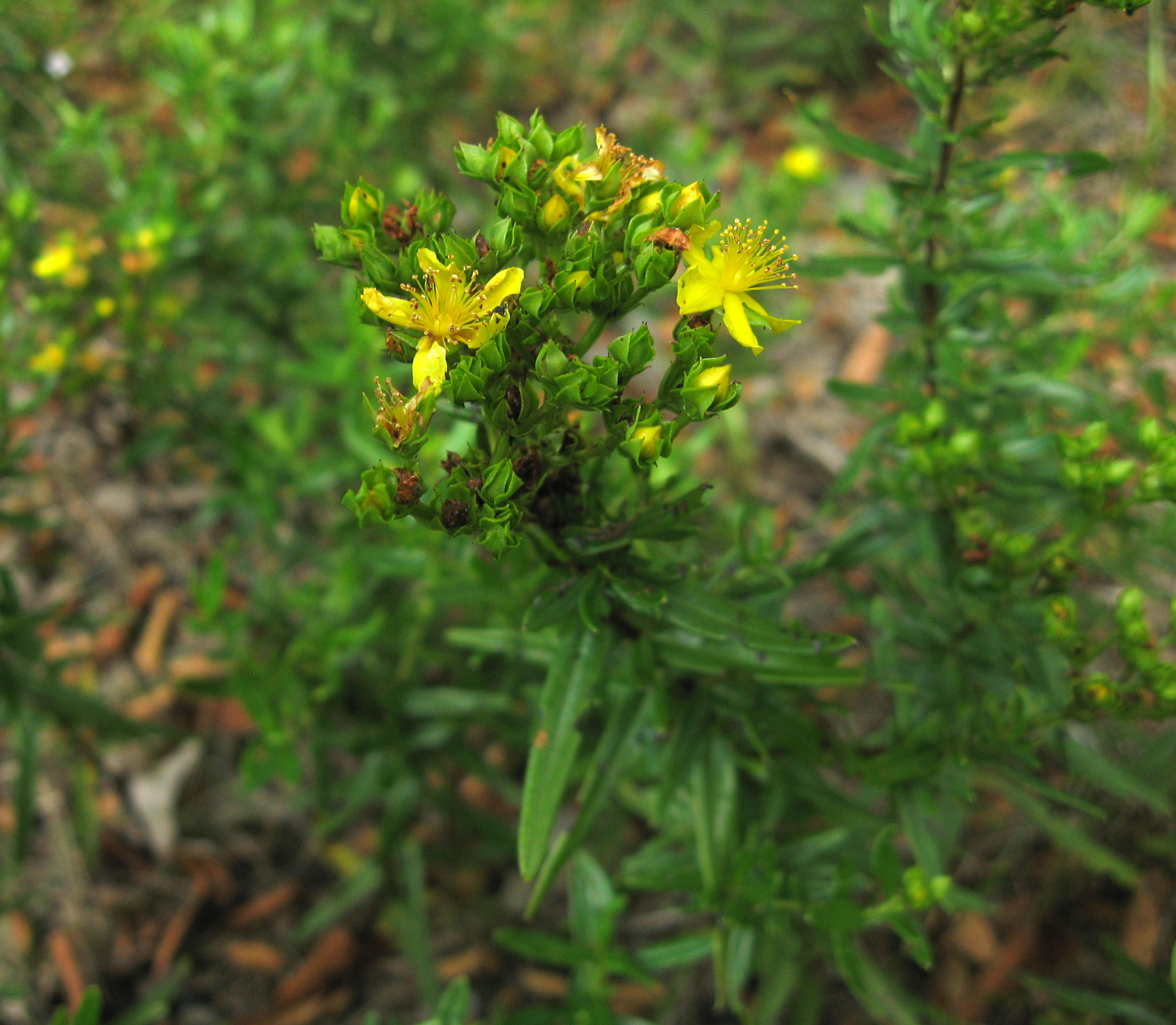

Scientific classification
- Kingdom: Plantae
- Clade: Tracheophytes
- Clade: Angiosperms
- Clade: Eudicots
- Clade: Rosids
- Order: Malpighiales
- Family: Hypericaceae
- Genus: Hypericum
- Section: H. sect. Myriandra
- Subsection: H. subsect. Suturosperma
- Species: H. sphaerocarpum

Binomial name
- Hypericum sphaerocarpum Michx.

= Hypericum sphaerocarpum =

Species of flowering plant

Hypericum sphaerocarpum, the roundseed St. Johnswort or barrens St. John's wort, is a species of flowering plant in the St. John's wort family. It is native to the Eastern United States where it is primarily found in the Midwest and Mid-South as well as Ontario, Canada. Its preferred habitat is dry, calcareous glades and prairies.

Hypericum sphaerocarpum is a semi-woody perennial that produces clusters of yellow flowers in the summer. It is often confused with Hypericum dolabriforme where their ranges overlap. H. sphaerocarpum can be distinguished by its smaller flowers, glossy leaves, and patch-forming rhizomes.
