= Frenchman's Forest Natural Area =

Nature reserve in Florida

Coordinates: 26.856974°N 80.072195°W

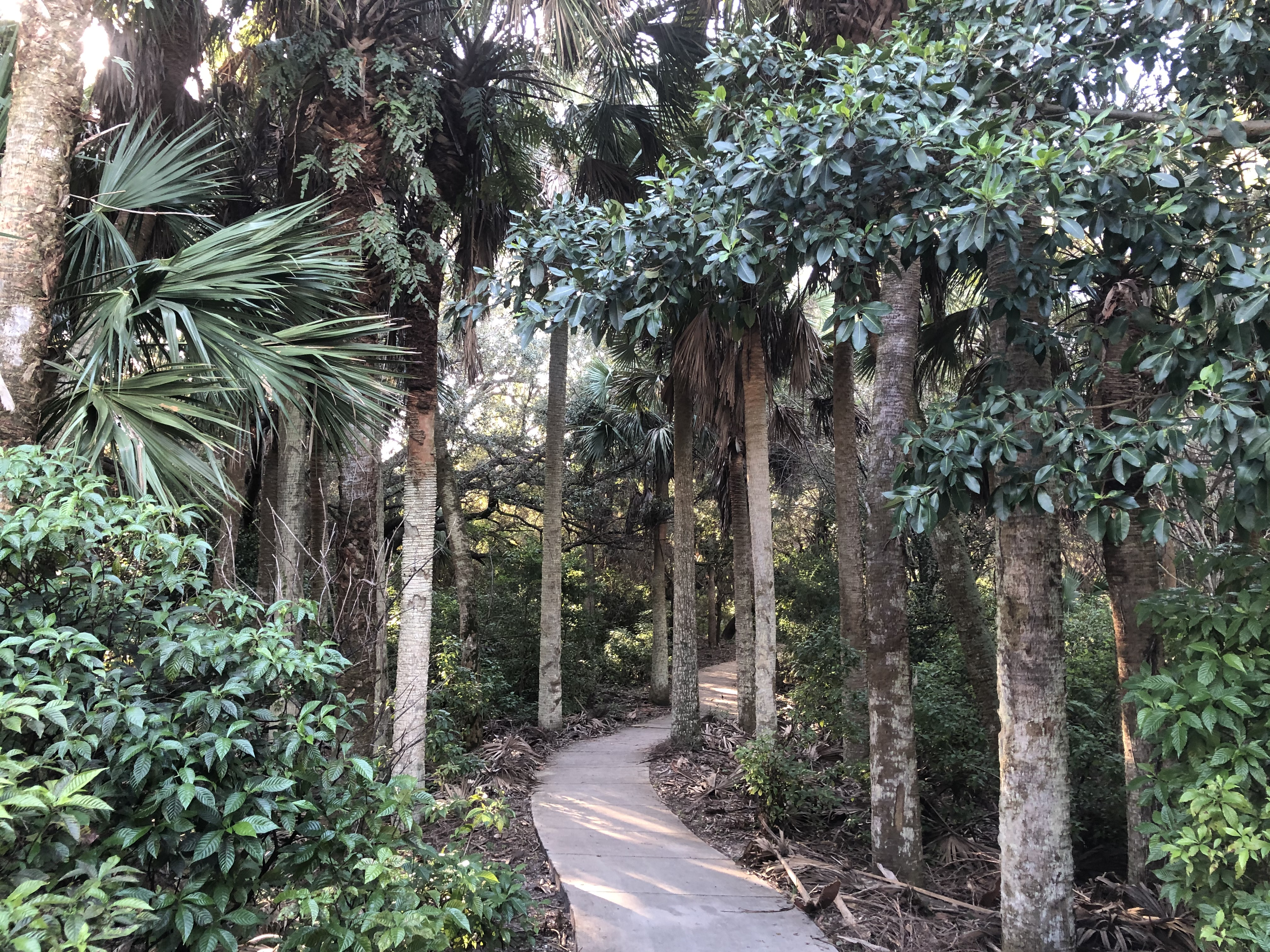
Frenchman's Forest Natural Area Trailhead

Frenchman's Forest Natural Area is a 158-acre (64 ha) protected area of pine flatwoods, strand swamp, scrubby flatwoods, hydric hammock tidal swamp and wet flatwoods in Palm Beach Gardens, Florida. It is located at 12201 Prosperity Farms Road. There are hiking trails and a boardwalk.
