= Lowland loosestrife =

Lowland loosestrife is a common name for several plants and may refer to:

- Lysimachia hybrida, a widespread North American plant
- Lythrum flagellare, endemic to Florida
