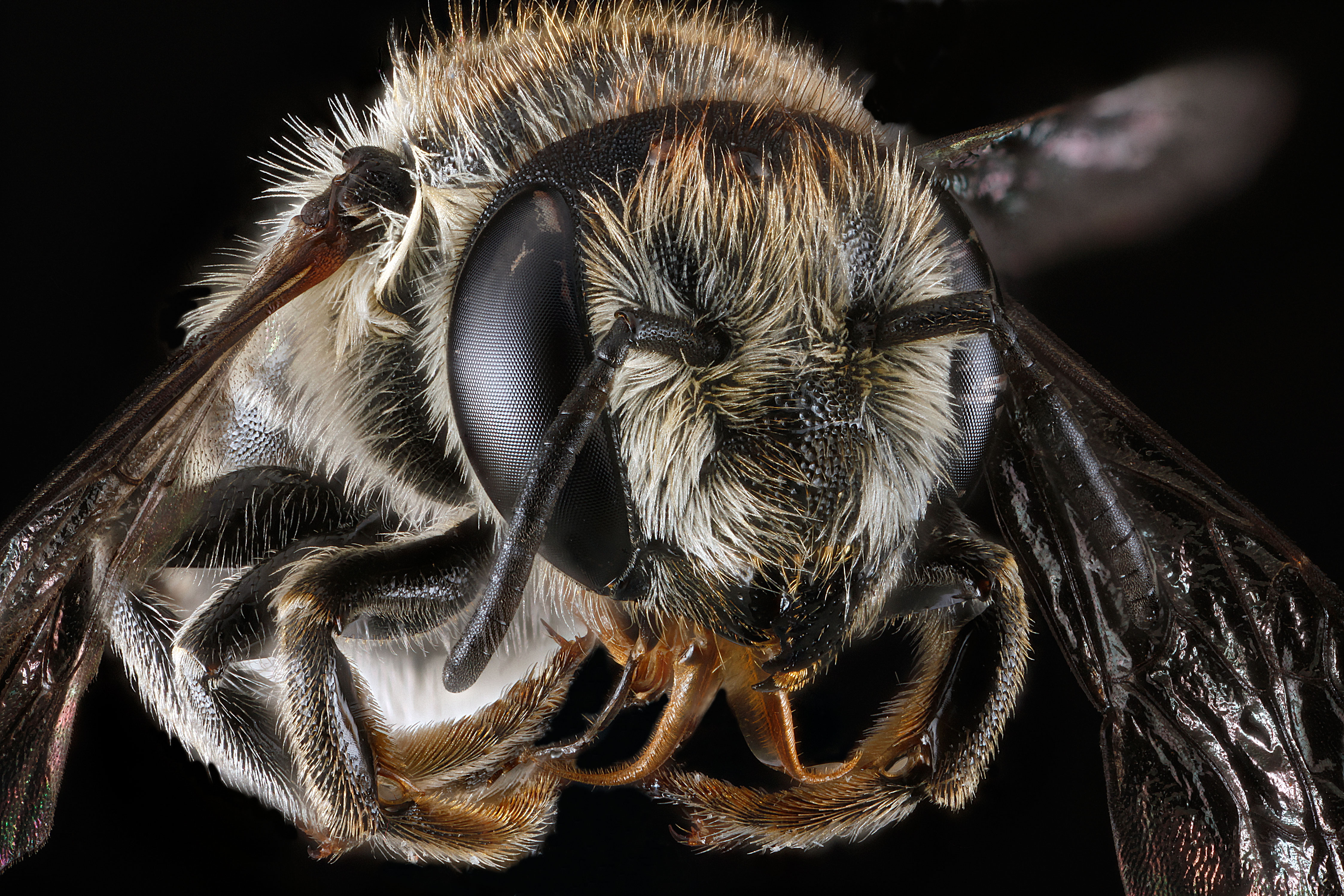

Scientific classification
- Domain: Eukaryota
- Kingdom: Animalia
- Phylum: Arthropoda
- Class: Insecta
- Order: Hymenoptera
- Family: Megachilidae
- Genus: Megachile
- Species: M. brevis

Binomial name
- Megachile brevis Say, 1837

= Megachile brevis =

Species of leafcutter bee (Megachile)

Megachile brevis is a species of leafcutter bee in the family Megachilidae. It was described by Thomas Say in 1837.
