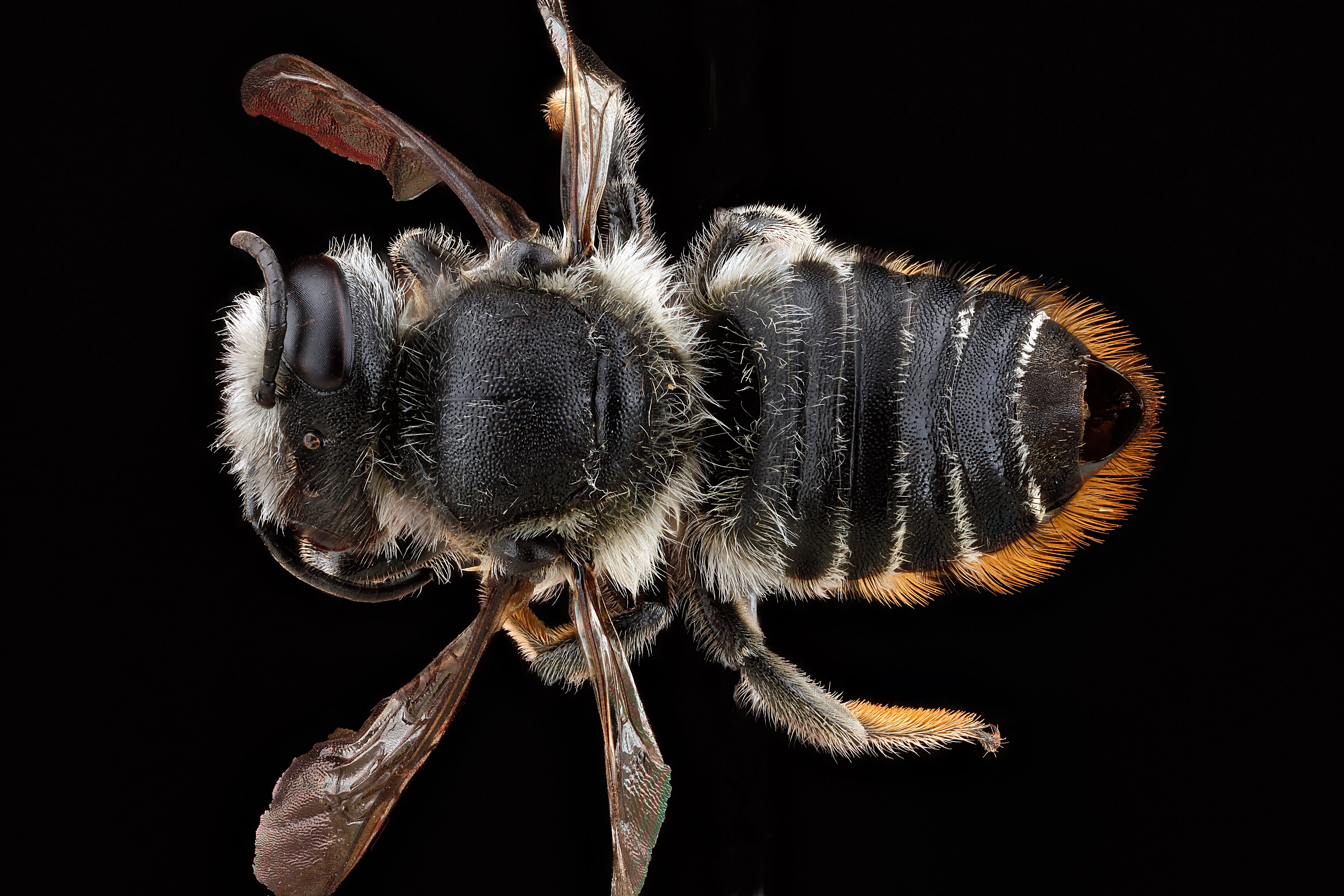
- Male

Scientific classification
- Kingdom: Animalia
- Phylum: Arthropoda
- Clade: Pancrustacea
- Class: Insecta
- Order: Hymenoptera
- Family: Megachilidae
- Genus: Megachile
- Species: M. mendica

Binomial name
- Megachile mendica Cresson, 1878

= Megachile mendica =

Species of leafcutter bee (Megachile)

Megachile mendica, the flat-tailed leafcutter bee, is a species of solitary bee in the family Megachilidae. It was described by Ezra Townsend Cresson in 1878.

The Flat-tailed Leafcutter Bee uses leaf pieces as nesting materials. It can be attracted to bee blocks and will nest in holes from 5/16" to 7/16" in diameter.
