= Myakka River State Park =

State park in Florida, United States

- IUCN category V (protected landscape/seascape)
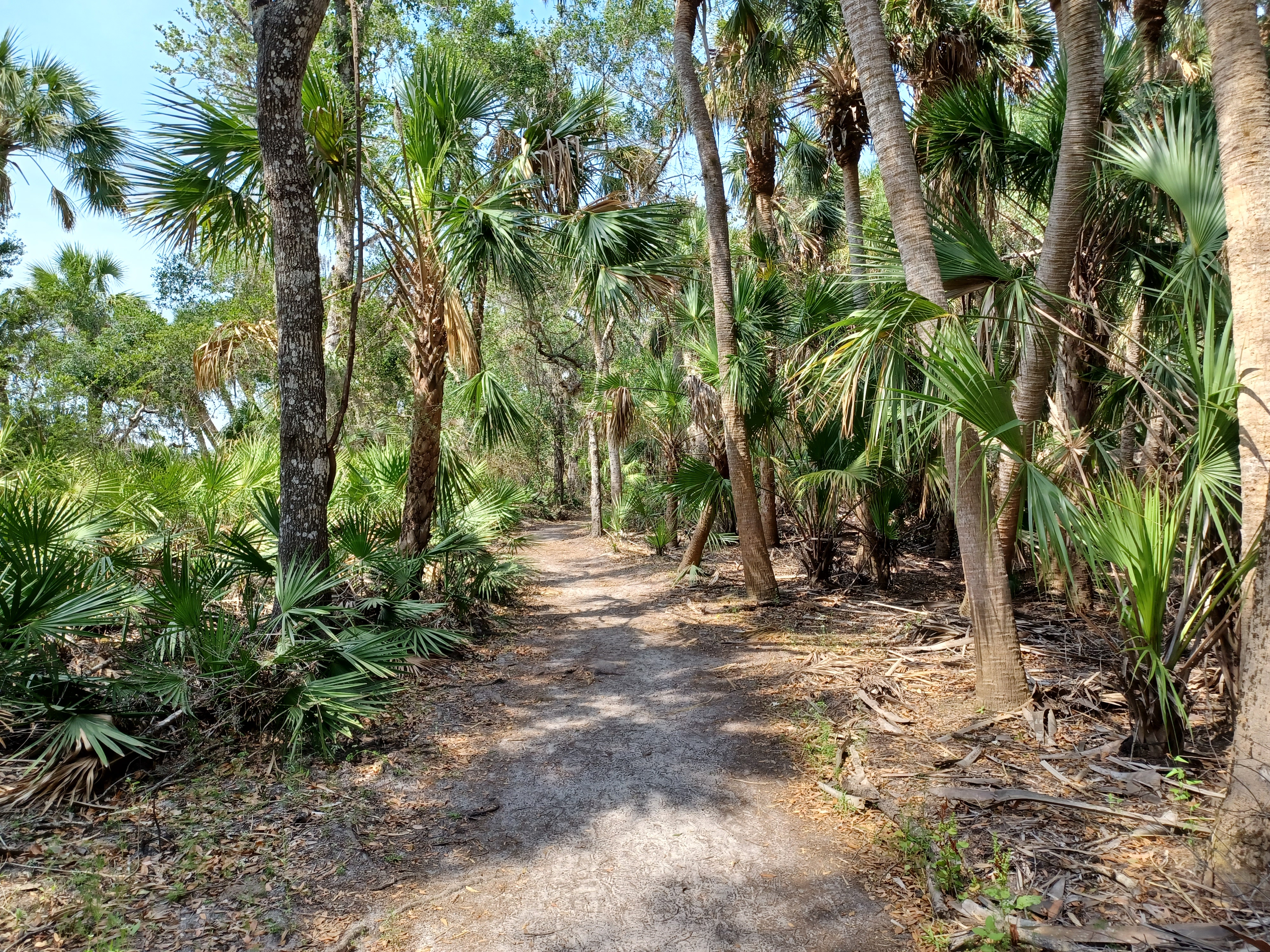

- Location within Florida Location within the United States
- Interactive map of Myakka River State Park
- Location: Manatee and Sarasota counties, Florida, USA
- Nearest city: Sarasota, Florida
- Coordinates: 27°14′22″N 82°19′00″W
- Area: 37,000 acres (150 km^{2})
- Established: February 18, 1941
- Governing body: Florida Department of Environmental Protection

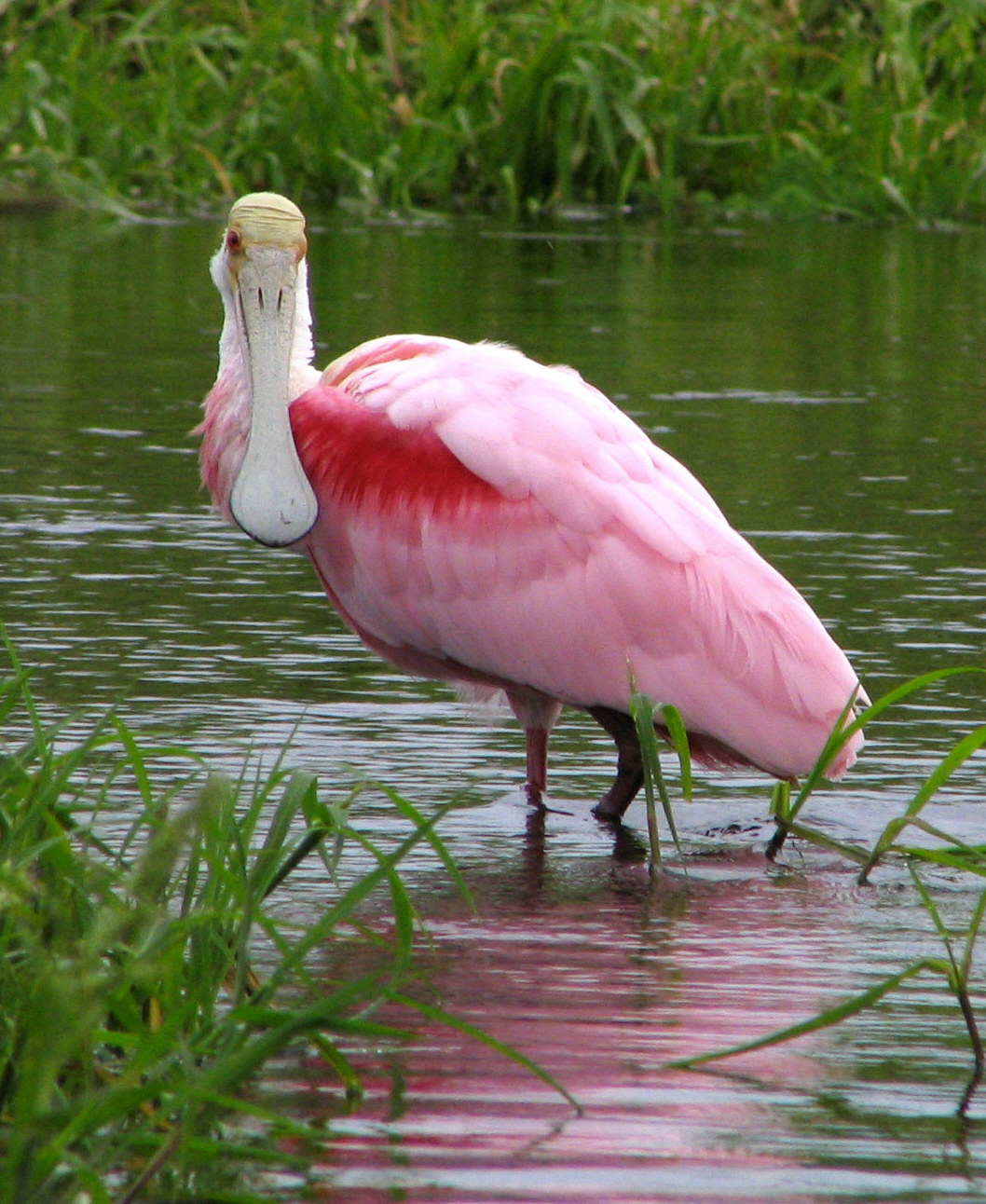
A roseate spoonbill is a Florida rarity often found among the noted wildlife of the park.

Myakka River State Park is a Florida State Park, that is located nine miles (14 km) east of Interstate 75 in Sarasota County and a portion of southeastern Manatee County on the Atlantic coastal plain. This state park consists of 37,000 acres (150 km^{2}), making it one of the state's largest parks. It is also one of the oldest parks in the state. It was delineated in the 1930s by the Civilian Conservation Corps. A small portion (1,920 acres or 7.8 km^{2}) of the park was the gift of the family of Bertha Palmer to the state. The park is managed and maintained by the Florida Department of Environmental Protection's Division of Recreation and Parks, with help from the Friends of Myakka River. The park is named after the Myakka River, Florida's first "Wild and Scenic River".

== History ==
In 1843, Florida Militia Colonel Samuel Reid, U.S. Deputy Surveyor for the region, encountered a group of Native Americans (possibly Seminole, Miccosukee or Creek) who told him the river he encountered was called the "Miarca", which was later spelled on maps as Myakka, as well as the headwaters of the river were called "Locha-notia", which translates to "sleeping turtle". During the 1850s, American settlers such as William Whitaker established cattle herds in the region, which were used for beef during the Civil War and later for trade with Cuba. In 1910, Bertha Palmer, a Chicagoan businesswoman, bought a vast amount of land near the Myakka River for cattle and swine ranching. During the Great Depression, President Roosevelt signed the New Deal and funded the Civilian Conservation Corps, through which Palmer's land was gifted for development into a state park. The Myakka River State Park officially opened in 1941.

== Environment ==
Myakka River State Park is in the southeastern conifer forests ecoregion. Plant communities in drier areas of the park consist of pine forests, scrubby flatwoods, and dry prairies. Florida longleaf pine flatwoods are woodlands dominated by longleaf pine (Pinus palustris). South Florida pine flatwoods are open woodlands of (Pinus elliottii var. densa) with a dense ground cover of grasses and shrubs. Florida dry prairies are flat, nearly treeless plains with dense cover of grasses, forbs, saw palmetto (Serenoa repens), and other low shrubs .

Wetlands in the park include marshes and forested wetlands. Floridian highlands freshwater marshes are depression marshes composed of different herbaceous plant communities that vary based on water depth. Southern coastal plain nonriverine cypress domes are small wetlands of bald cypress (Taxodium distichum) notable for their dome-shaped appearance.

A karst sinkhole named Deep Hole is located on the northwest bank of the Myakka River in the Wilderness Preserve. The sinkhole is 135 feet (41 m) deep, and no evidence of a spring was found by a 2011–2012 research team.

Rivers in the park support hammocks and floodplain forests. Near the floodplains of spring-fed rivers grow southern coastal plain hydric hammocks, dense forests of evergreen and deciduous hardwood trees. Blackwater rivers support southern coastal plain blackwater river floodplain forests of baldcypress along their banks.

=== Climate ===
Climate data for Myakka River State Park, Florida, 1991–2020 normals, extremes 1956–present
Month	Jan	Feb	Mar	Apr	May	Jun	Jul	Aug	Sep	Oct	Nov	Dec	Year
Record high °F (°C)	89 (32)	91 (33)	95 (35)	98 (37)	104 (40)	105 (41)	101 (38)	104 (40)	103 (39)	98 (37)	96 (36)	90 (32)	105 (41)
Mean maximum °F (°C)	84.5 (29.2)	85.7 (29.8)	88.7 (31.5)	91.8 (33.2)	95.3 (35.2)	97.1 (36.2)	96.6 (35.9)	97.0 (36.1)	95.3 (35.2)	95.9 (35.5)	88.9 (31.6)	85.4 (29.7)	98.4 (36.9)
Mean daily maximum °F (°C)	74.5 (23.6)	77.6 (25.3)	80.7 (27.1)	85.2 (29.6)	89.8 (32.1)	91.7 (33.2)	92.3 (33.5)	92.5 (33.6)	90.7 (32.6)	86.5 (30.3)	80.8 (27.1)	76.6 (24.8)	84.9 (29.4)
Daily mean °F (°C)	62.2 (16.8)	65.0 (18.3)	67.9 (19.9)	72.5 (22.5)	77.4 (25.2)	81.2 (27.3)	82.5 (28.1)	83.1 (28.4)	81.4 (27.4)	76.3 (24.6)	69.1 (20.6)	64.8 (18.2)	73.6 (23.1)
Mean daily minimum °F (°C)	50.0 (10.0)	52.4 (11.3)	55.2 (12.9)	59.8 (15.4)	64.9 (18.3)	70.7 (21.5)	72.8 (22.7)	73.6 (23.1)	72.2 (22.3)	66.1 (18.9)	57.4 (14.1)	53.0 (11.7)	62.3 (16.8)
Mean minimum °F (°C)	31.2 (−0.4)	34.3 (1.3)	38.6 (3.7)	45.6 (7.6)	54.9 (12.7)	64.8 (18.2)	68.7 (20.4)	69.7 (20.9)	66.2 (19.0)	52.3 (11.3)	41.9 (5.5)	35.6 (2.0)	29.4 (−1.4)
Record low °F (°C)	18 (−8)	22 (−6)	28 (−2)	34 (1)	43 (6)	50 (10)	59 (15)	60 (16)	58 (14)	37 (3)	24 (−4)	18 (−8)	18 (−8)
Average precipitation inches (mm)	2.85 (72)	2.44 (62)	3.00 (76)	2.98 (76)	3.75 (95)	9.95 (253)	9.81 (249)	10.12 (257)	8.45 (215)	3.19 (81)	2.02 (51)	2.51 (64)	61.07 (1,551)
Average precipitation days (≥ 0.01 in)	7.2	5.6	5.8	5.2	7.3	15.4	18.7	18.6	15.5	8.2	5.3	7.0	119.8
Source: NOAA

== Recreation ==
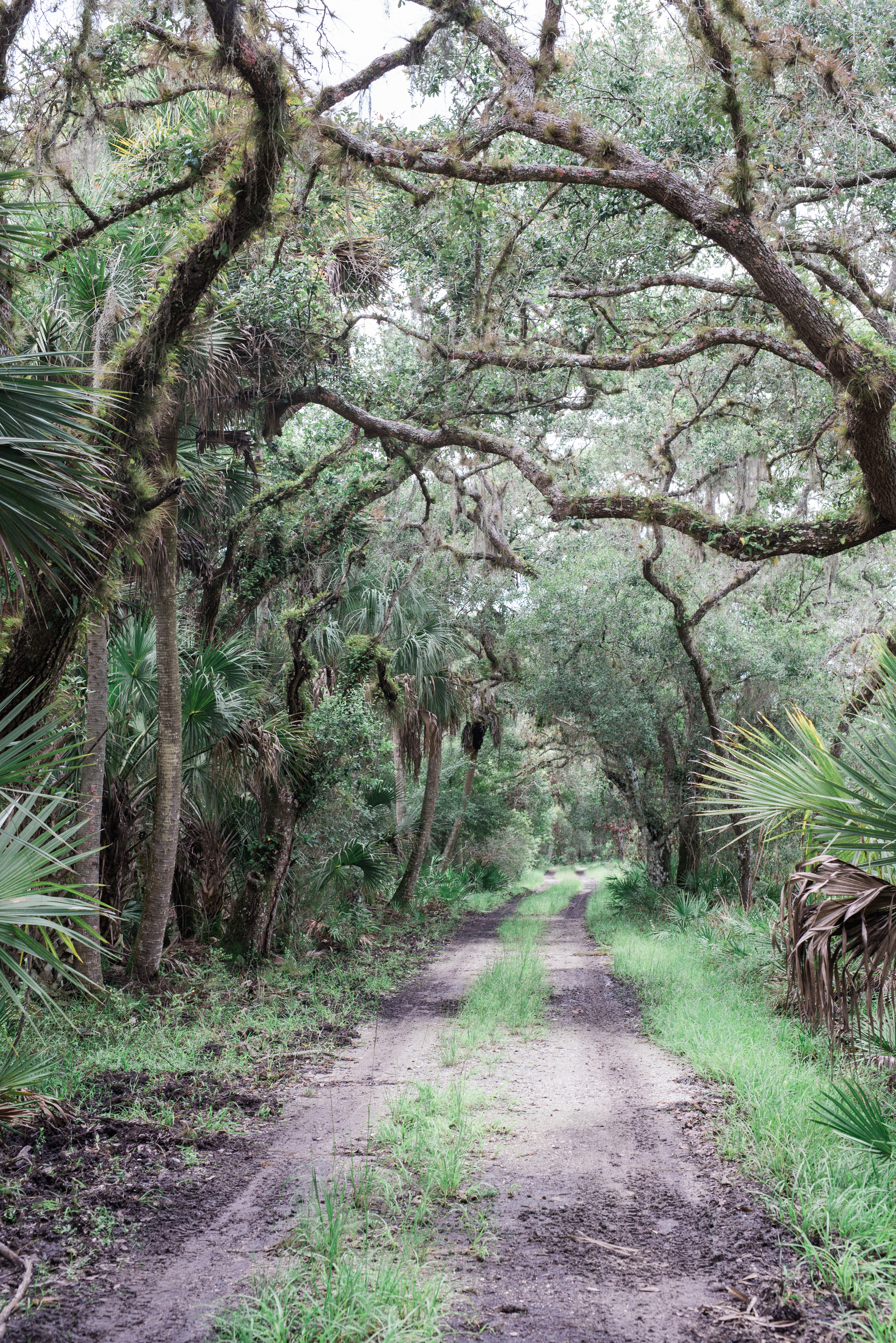
The park in summer

The park is noted for its wildlife, and some of the rarer birds seen in Florida, such as the roseate spoonbill, frequent the park. Native flora flourishes in the park. There are many species of fish, amphibians, reptiles, and mammals to learn about and enjoy watching.

Myakka River State Park's main road, a 6.5-mile (10.5 km) drive between the north and south ends, leads visitors to a boardwalk out to the river and a lake that is excellent for bird watching. The main drive is also popular with cyclists, runners, and skaters. Bicycle traffic can be heavy, especially on weekends and holidays. A walk from the main road reveals Myakka's canopy walkway, North America's first public treetop trail with a suspension bridge and a tower that provides researchers and visitors with both a view of the forest canopy and an above-the-treetops view of the entire park. The walkway is suspended 7.6 meters (25 ft) above the ground and 30 meters (100 ft) through the hammock canopy, with the tower standing 23 meters (74 ft) in the air.

Walking trails crisscross the eastern side of the park. Horseback riding and biking are permitted on certain designated trails and roads in the park. This part of the park is dominated by expanses of very low vegetation, fields of palmetto that give way to islands, or hammocks, of tall pine and oak trees. Six primitive campgrounds are accessible by trail throughout the park: Mossy Hammock, Bee Island, Panther Point, Honore, Oak Grove, and Prairie.

The park contains a 300-foot-wide, 130-foot-deep sinkhole, partially surrounded by Lower Myakka Lake, known as the Deep Hole. A five-mile hiking trail to the Deep Hole allows hikers to view several hundred American alligators that live along the lake's shores. A maximum of 30 hiking permits is issued each morning at the park's opening; visitors are encouraged to camp in the park the night before to increase their chances of securing a permit.

Picnic areas, canoeing, boat tours, and developed campsites are available, along with an outpost offering bike and canoe rentals, a souvenir shop, a camping supply store, and the Pink Gator Cafe. The park has five cabins built from the trunks of native sabal palms.

== Gallery ==
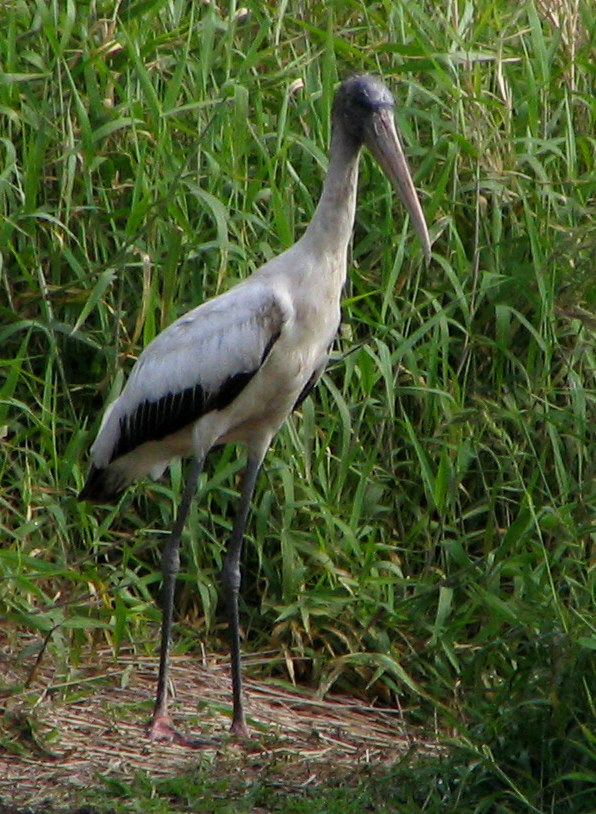
Wood stork

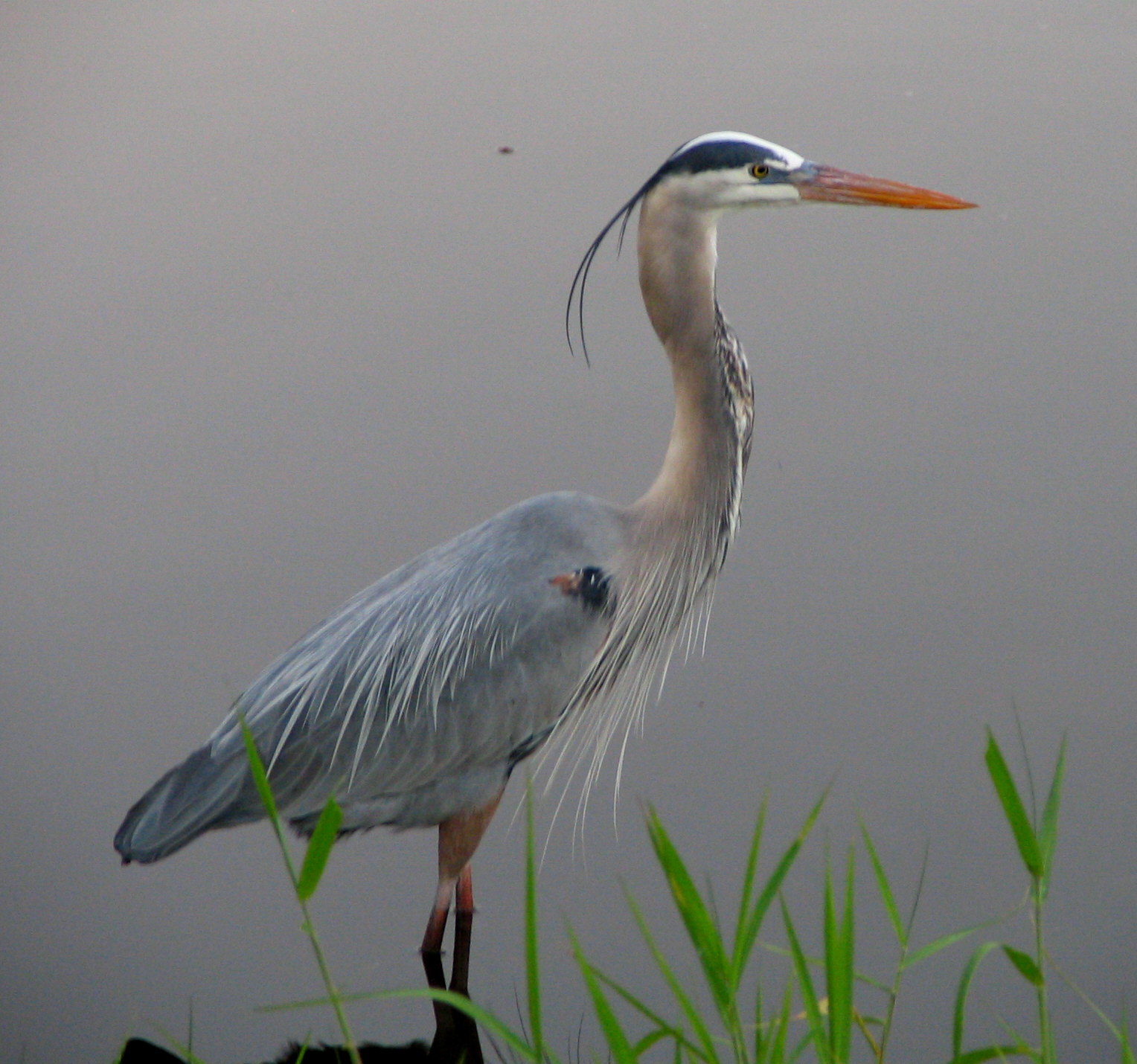
A great blue heron

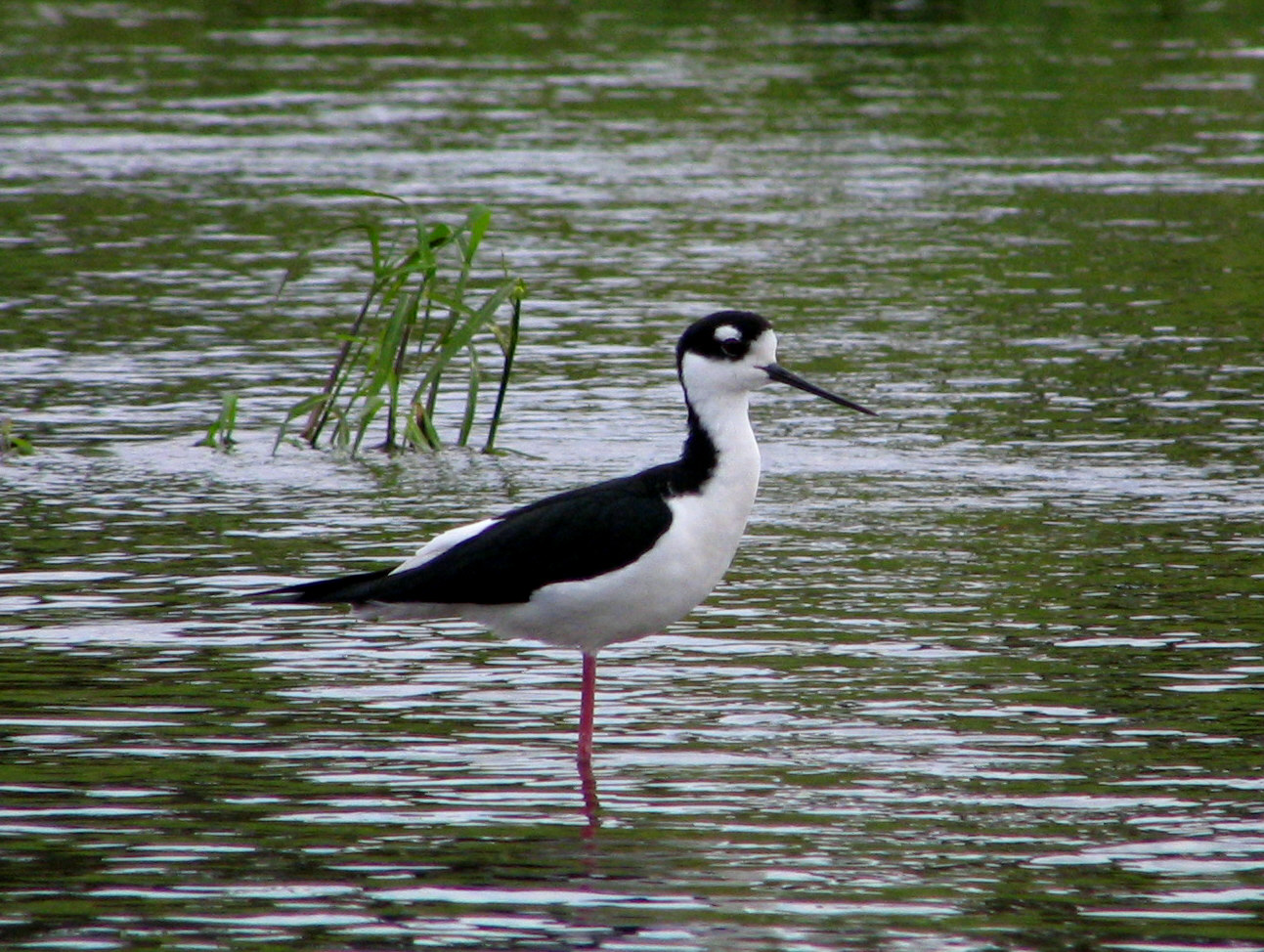
Black-necked stilt

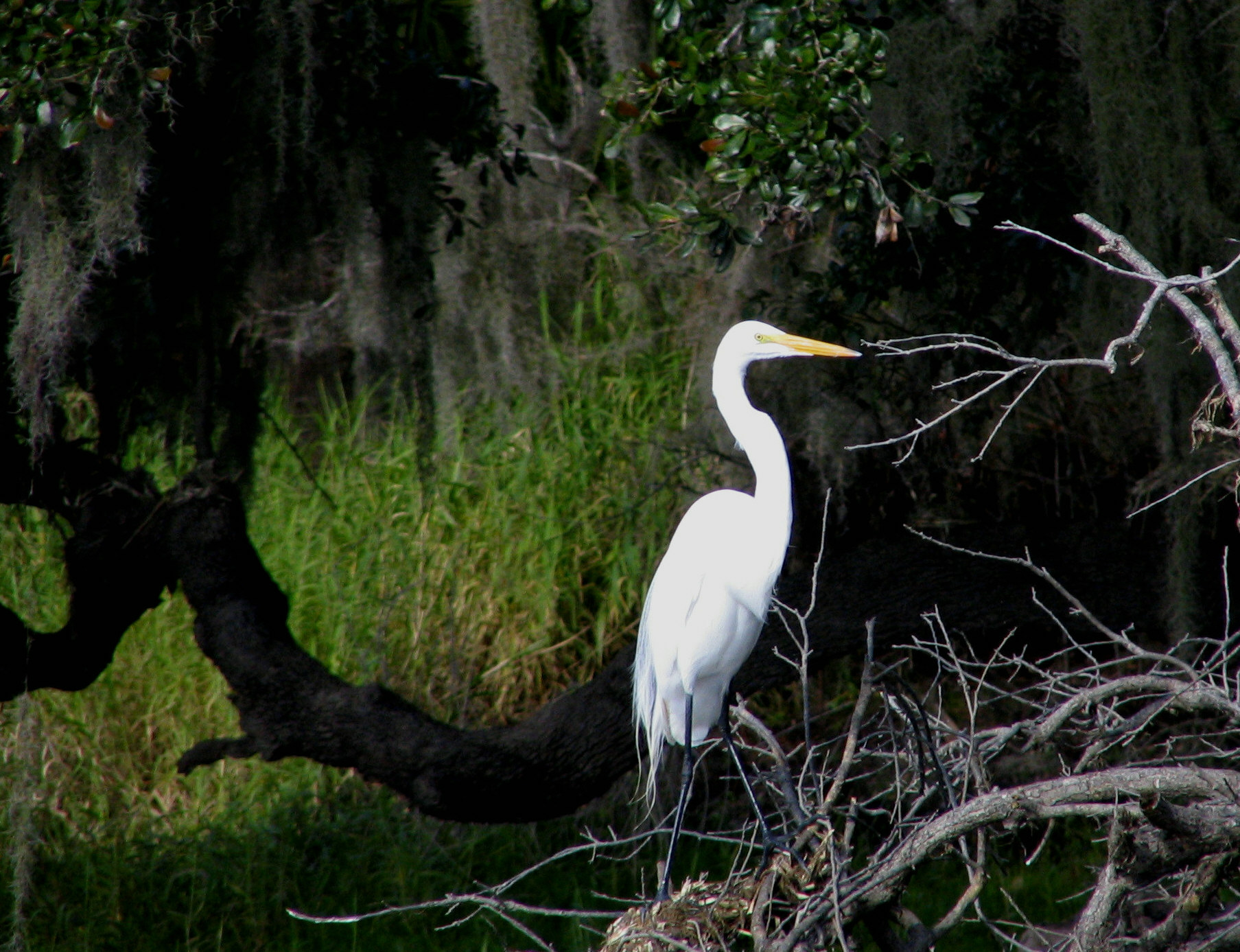
A great egret

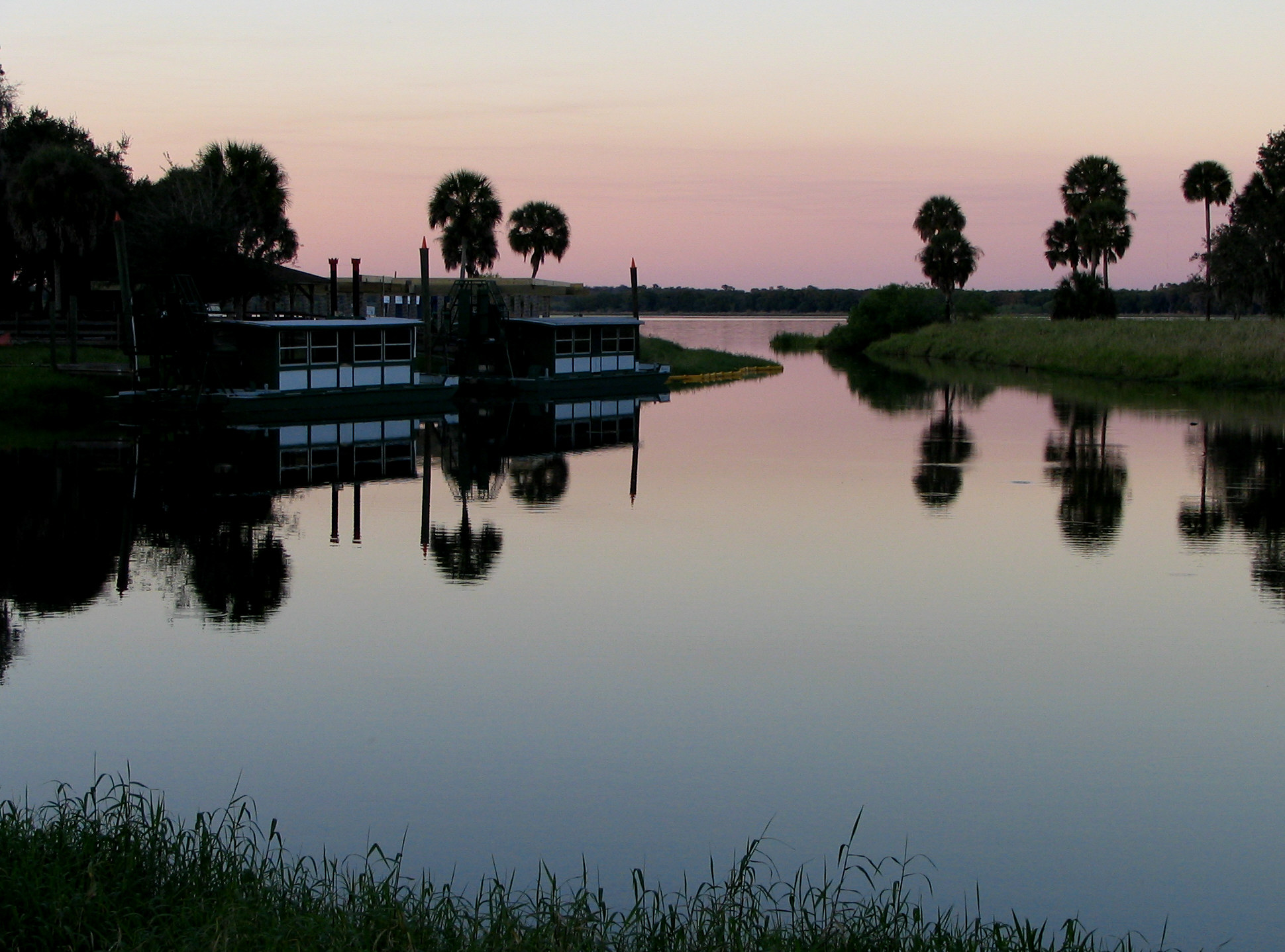
The Boat Basin with airboats Gator Gal and Myakka Maiden

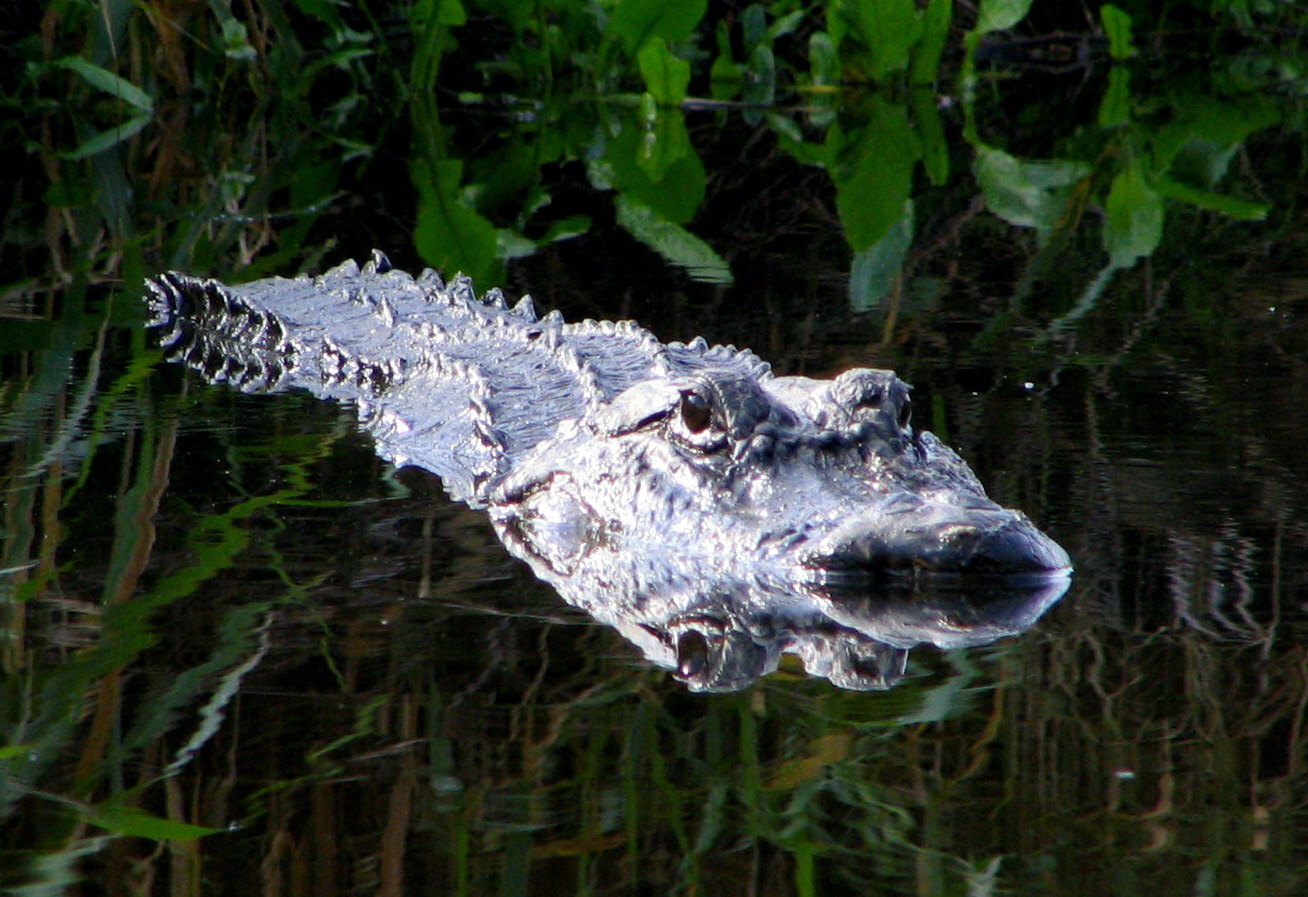
Alligators abound

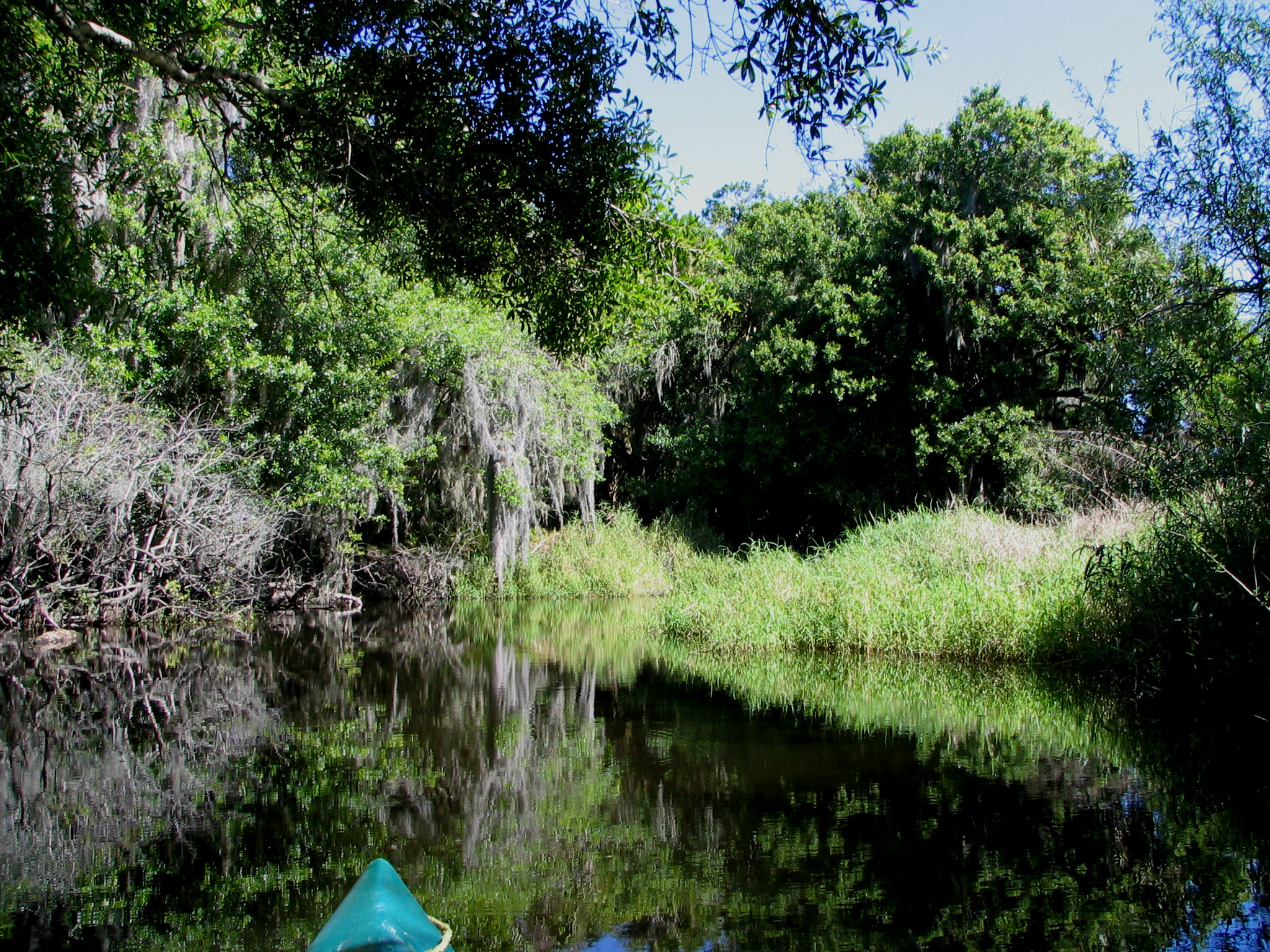
Kayaking on the Myakka River

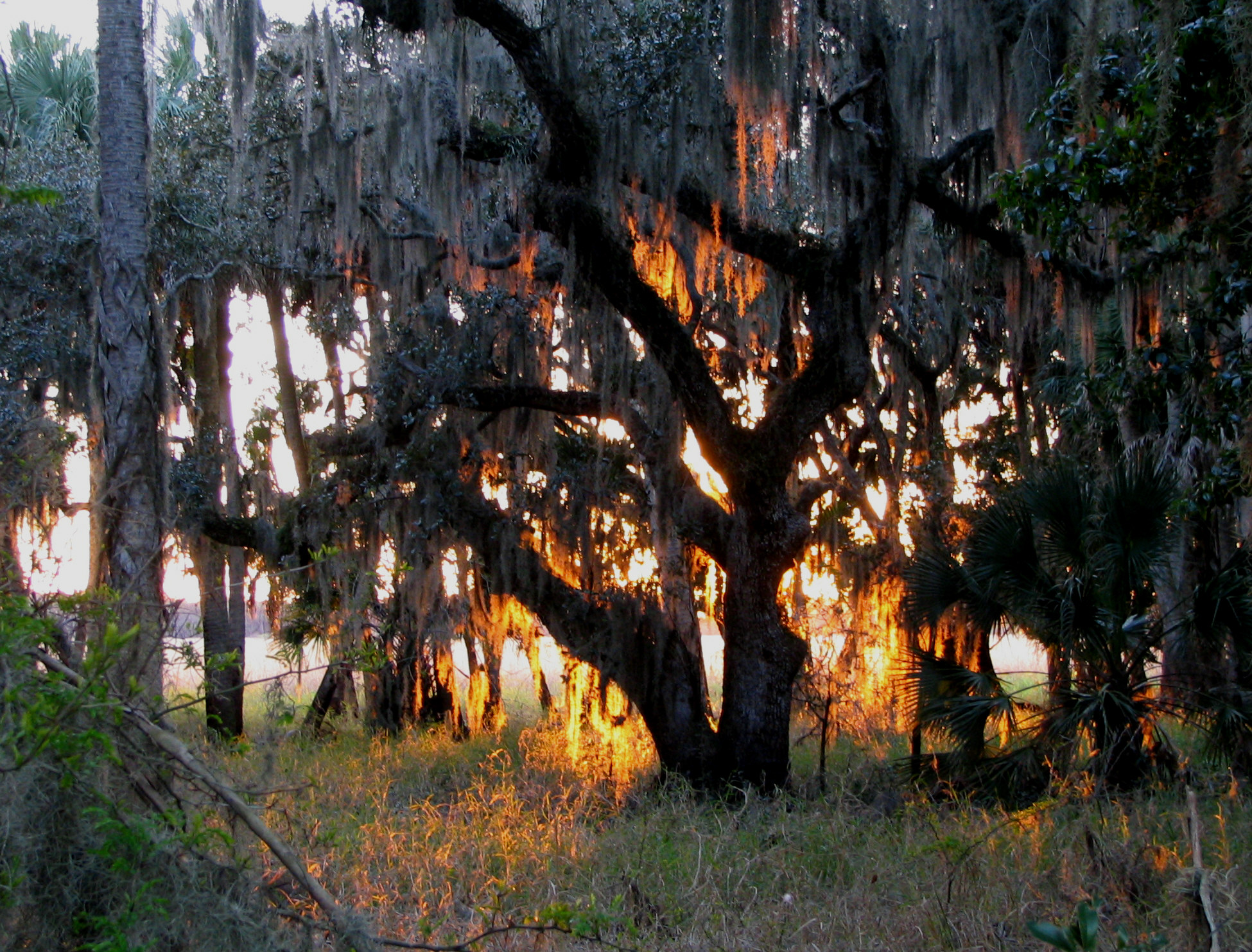
Myakka River Sunset

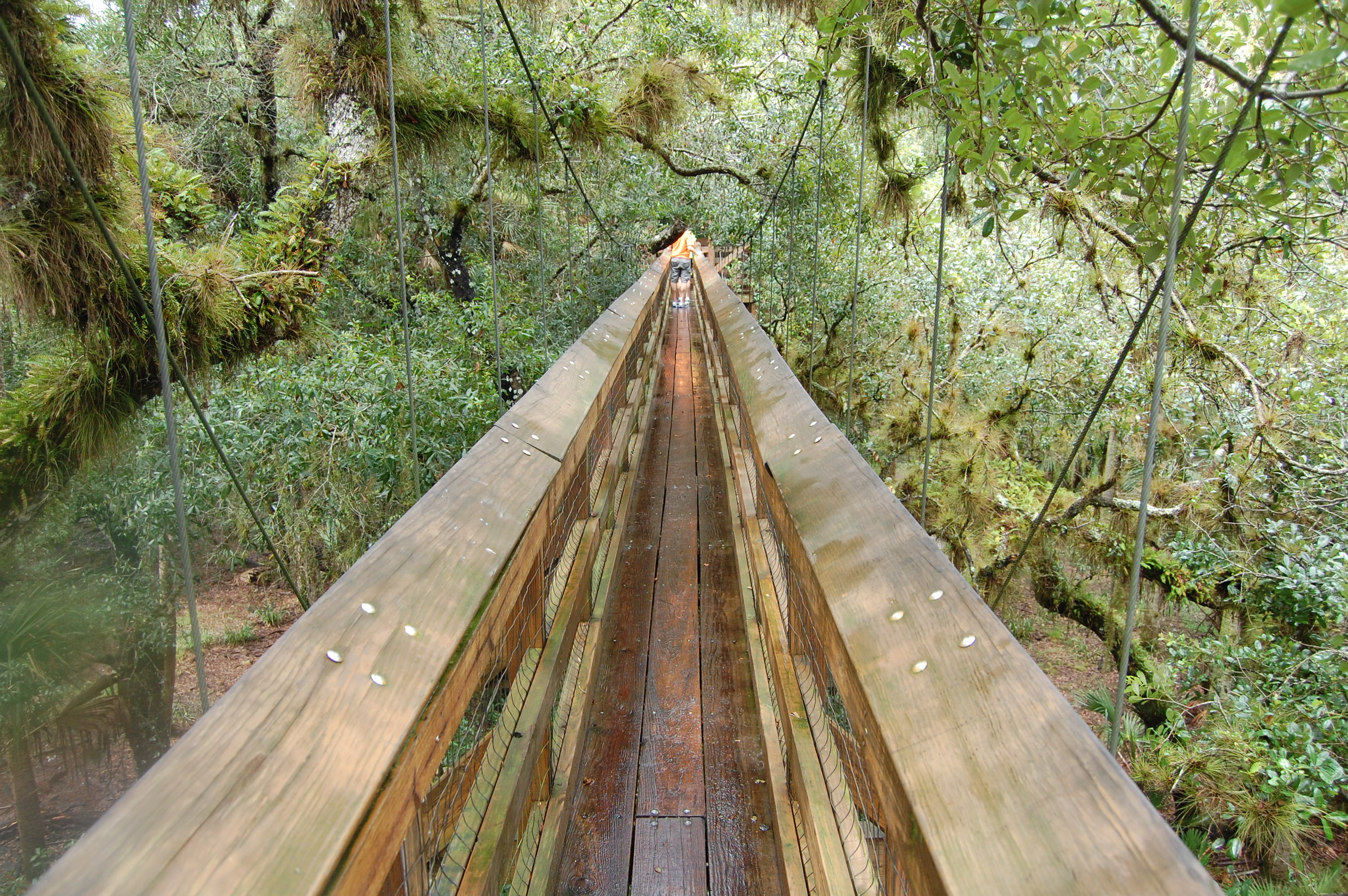
View walking on the Canopy Walkway

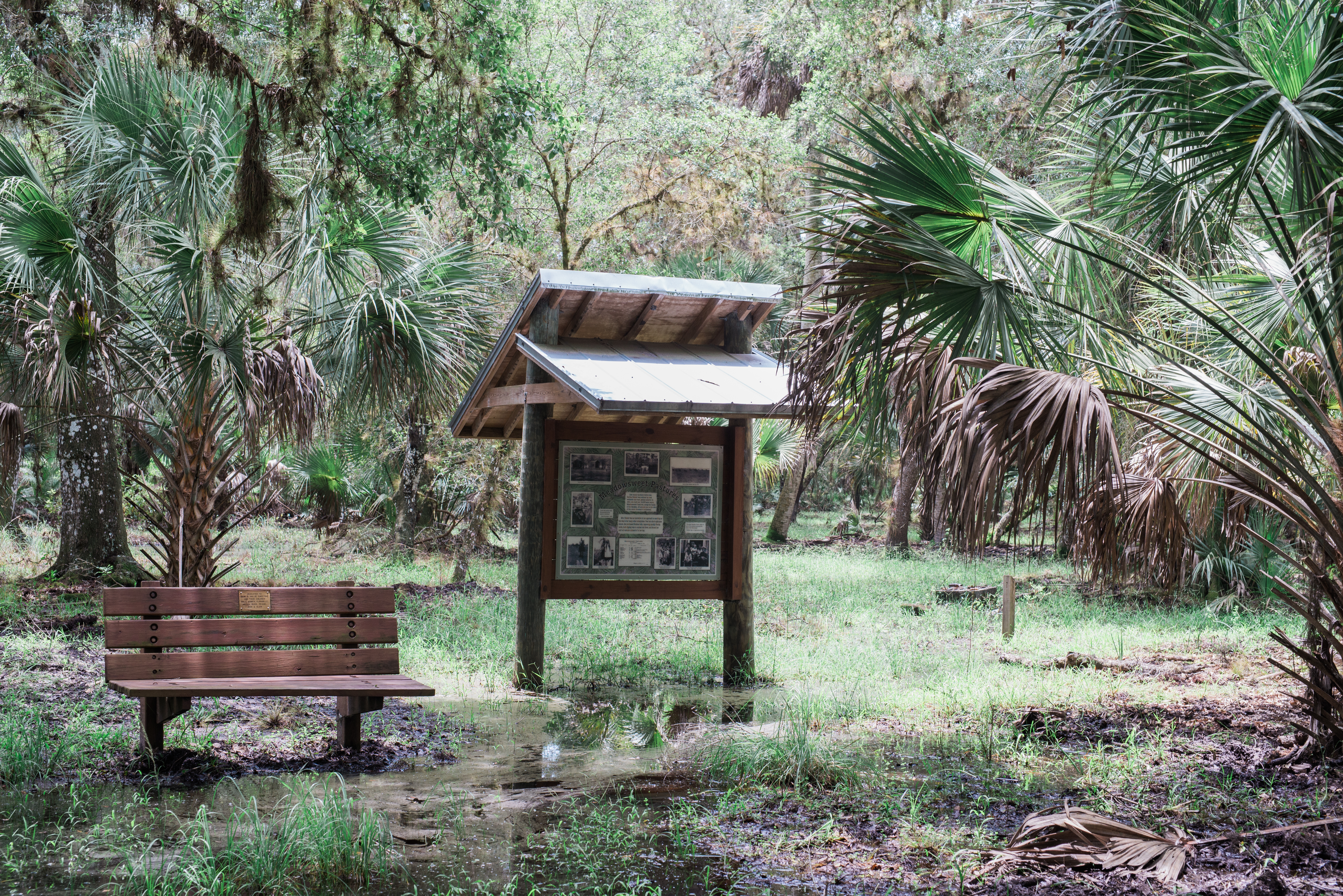
Trails flooded after heavy rains

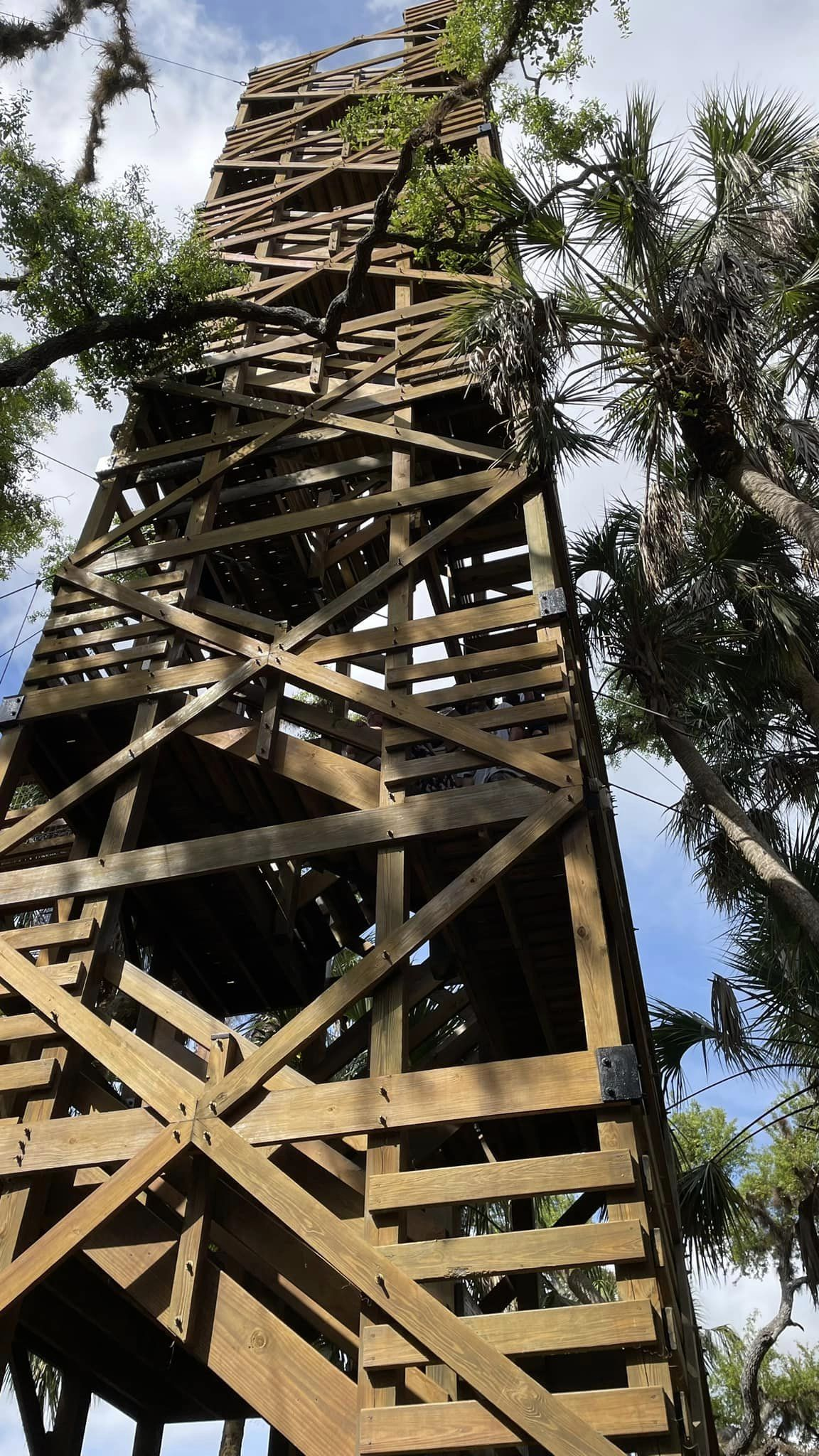
The Canopy Walk at Myakka River State Park
