= Carp Hills =

Landform in Ottawa, Ontario, Canada

- Carp Ridge
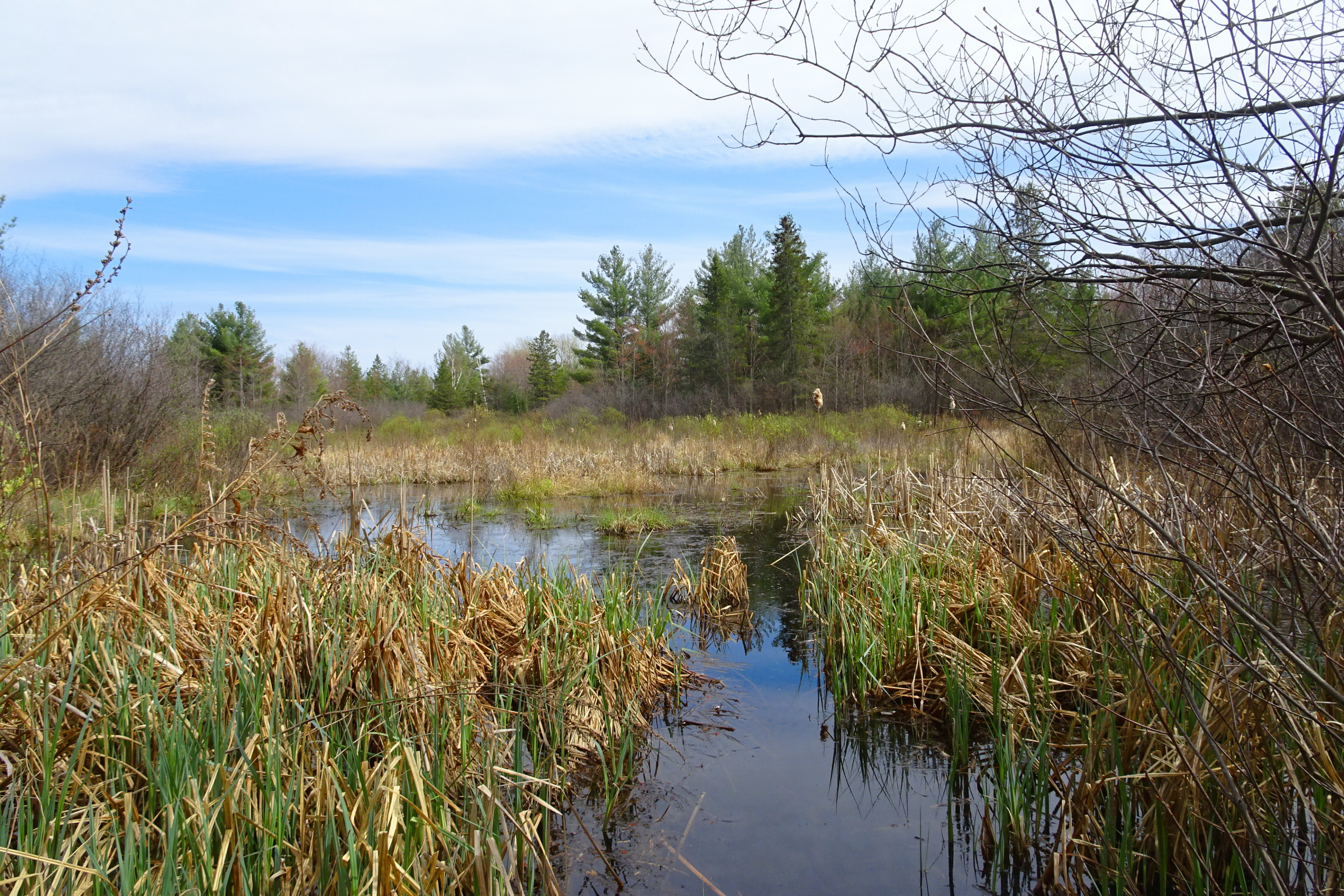

Highest point
- Elevation: 129 m (423 ft)

Dimensions
- Area: 4,000 ha (10,000 acres)

Geography
- Location within Southern Ontario
- Country: Canada
- Province: Ontario
- City: Ottawa
- Range coordinates: 45°22′50″N 76°04′07″W

The Carp Hills (also known as Carp Ridge) are a small range of rocky hills between the shallow valleys of the Carp River and Constance Creek, entirely within the West Carleton-March Ward of Canada's capital, Ottawa, Ontario. It runs roughly from Kinburn Side Road southeast to the village of Carp and the South March Highlands at March Road.

The hills cover roughly 4,000 hectares (10,000 acres) and are mostly undeveloped. The ridge is an extension of the Canadian Shield, with a landscape that is characterized by a mix of rocky outcrops, grassland, marshes, numerous shallow ponds, and patches of mature forest. Its pristine rugged nature has been compared to the nearby Gatineau Park and is regarded as an "ecological jewel".

The Carp Ridge is used for hiking, hunting, cross-country skiing, and snowmobiling. Among the few walking and hiking trails on the ridge are the Carp Barrens Trail, a 3-kilometre (1.9 mi) trail south of Thomas Dolan Parkway, the Crazy Horse trail, a 6.2-kilometre (3.9 mi) loop trail starting at March Road, and pathways at Hidden Lake Park in the village of Carp.

== Geology ==
The hills are an outcrop of Precambrian bedrock, unique in the city of Ottawa, which otherwise is relatively flat. Its geology is complex, consisting of gneiss, granite, and marble substrates, and it supports a number of vegetation-landform ecologies, such as mature deciduous and mixed highland forest and mixed and coniferous lowland forest, which are rare in the area and southeastern Ontario. Typical to Canadian Shield, it has rolling terrain with highly irregular drainage and a thin soil cover with barren vegetation. A section of the hills, the Carp Barrens, spread along both sides of Thomas Dolan Parkway, is characterized by the "most extensive, best-expressed complex of granite bedrock barrens", not only on the Carp Ridge, but also in southern Ontario east of the Thousand Islands – Frontenac Arch.

The western side of the hills are an exposed fault, creating a ridge that provides good views of the surrounding rural countryside. The gneiss at the Carp Barrens contains mica, and 2 small mines once operated there.

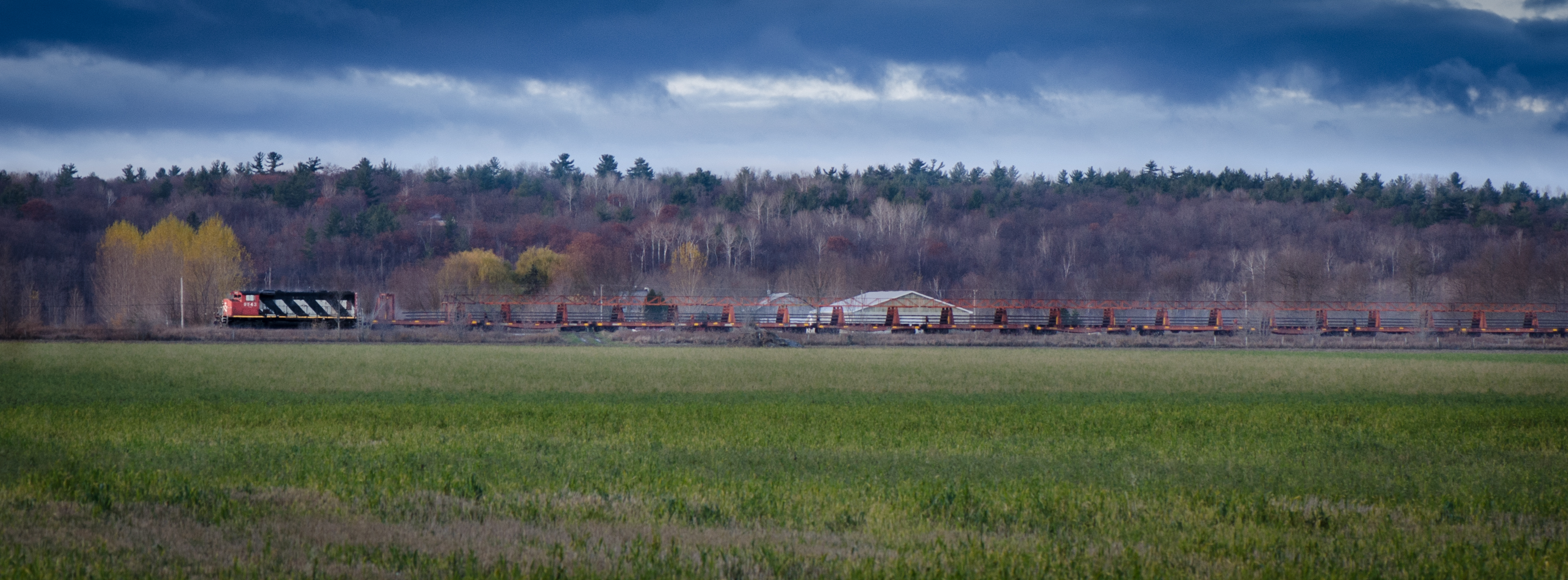
Carp Ridge as seen from the east

== Environment ==
The hills have a high biodiversity of more than 600 species of plants and animals, including species at risk. Its wetlands contribute clean water year round to the Carp River through surface streams and underground aquifers, which in turn provide the water supply to local wells.

=== Flora ===
The diversity of vegetation is exceptional. Almost 180 taxa can be found, including several populations of provincially rare and regionally rare taxa.

Among the tree species present are white pine, white spruce, red maple, sugar maple, trembling aspen, white birch, large-toothed aspen, red oak, bur oak, and common juniper.

Other vegetation found in the hills are orchids (including the regionally significant showy orchid (Galearis spectabilis), downy rattlesnake plantain, (Goodyera pubescens), checkered rattlesnake plantain (Goodyera tesselata), and spotted coralroot (Corallorhiza maculata), ricegrass (Oryzopsis racemosa), bottlebrush grass (Elymus hystrix), tick-trefoil (Desmodium glutinosum), blueberry (Vaccinium spp.) and staghorn sumac (Rhus typhina), as well as 13 species of liverworts, 69 species of mosses, and 25 species of lichens.

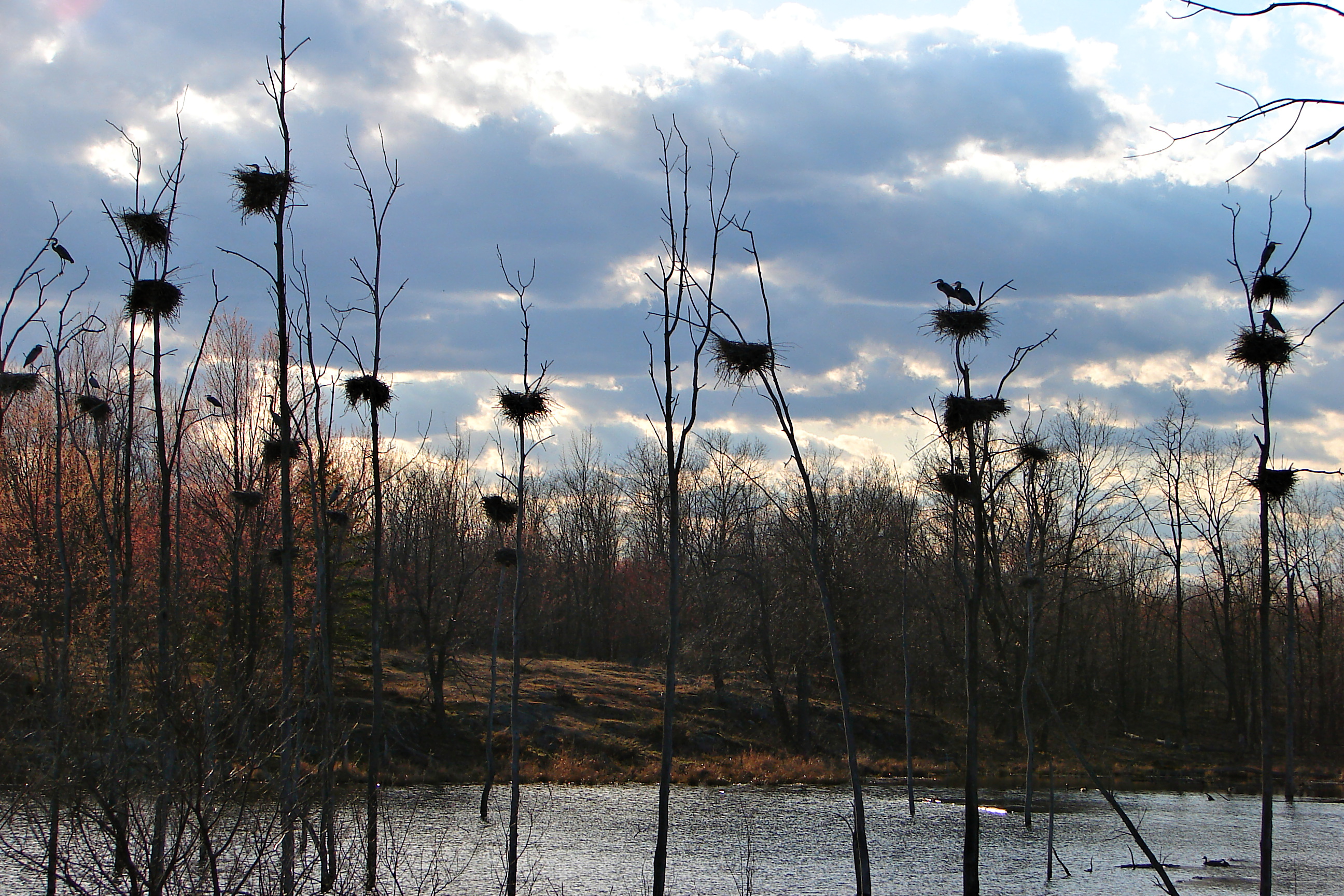
Heron rookery in the Carp Hills

=== Fauna ===
Wildlife include coyote, white-tailed deer, black bear, beaver, porcupine, Blanding's turtle, midland painted turtle, chipmunk, snowshoe hare, and squirrels.

Bird species include songbirds, waterfowl, and birds of prey, such as herons, red-tailed hawk, common nighthawk, chestnut-sided warbler, eastern whip-poor-will, field sparrow, golden-winged warbler, indigo bunting, northern shrike, pileated woodpecker, great horned owl, and eastern towhee.

The hills are a hotspot for ticks, mostly black-legged ticks, many of which carry the bacteria (Borrelia burgdorferi) that causes Lyme disease.

== Conservation ==
The environmental importance of the ridge has been recognized since at least 1971 when it was mapped as a "proposed conservation area" with a similar area as the Mer Bleue Conservation Area on the east side of Ottawa. But under pressure by landowners, the designation was withdrawn. In 2012, the updated NCC Master Plan identified the Carp Hills as a significant natural area, and recommended a natural corridor to connect the ridge to the Ottawa Greenbelt via the South March Highlands.

While the hills, as well as the barrens separately, have been designated as a candidate Area of Natural and Scientific Interest (ANSI) by the provincial government and has many Provincially Significant Wetlands (PSW), it was not until 2018 that an area was protected. That year Ducks Unlimited purchased a 180-hectare (440-acre) parcel of land near the village of Carp for conservation. The city of Ottawa owns several pieces of non-contiguous land totalling 1,000 hectares (2,500 acres), designated as Natural Environment Area or Municipal Nature Reserve for environmental protection and outdoor recreation. But the rest of the ridge is privately owned and unprotected, although zoning bylaws place some limitations on development.

== See also ==
- Opeongo Hills – range of hills to the west, also part of the Canadian Shield
- Laurentian Upland – physiographic region
