= Ryōkichi =

- Gender: Male

Origin
- Origin: Japanese
- Meaning: Different meanings depending on the kanji used

Ryōkichi, Ryokichi, Ryoukichi or Ryohkichi (written: 良吉 or 亮吉) is a masculine Japanese given name. Notable people with the name include:

- Ryokichi Minobe (美濃部 亮吉; 1904–1984), Japanese politician
- Ryōkichi Yatabe (矢田部 良吉; 1851–1899), Japanese botanist
