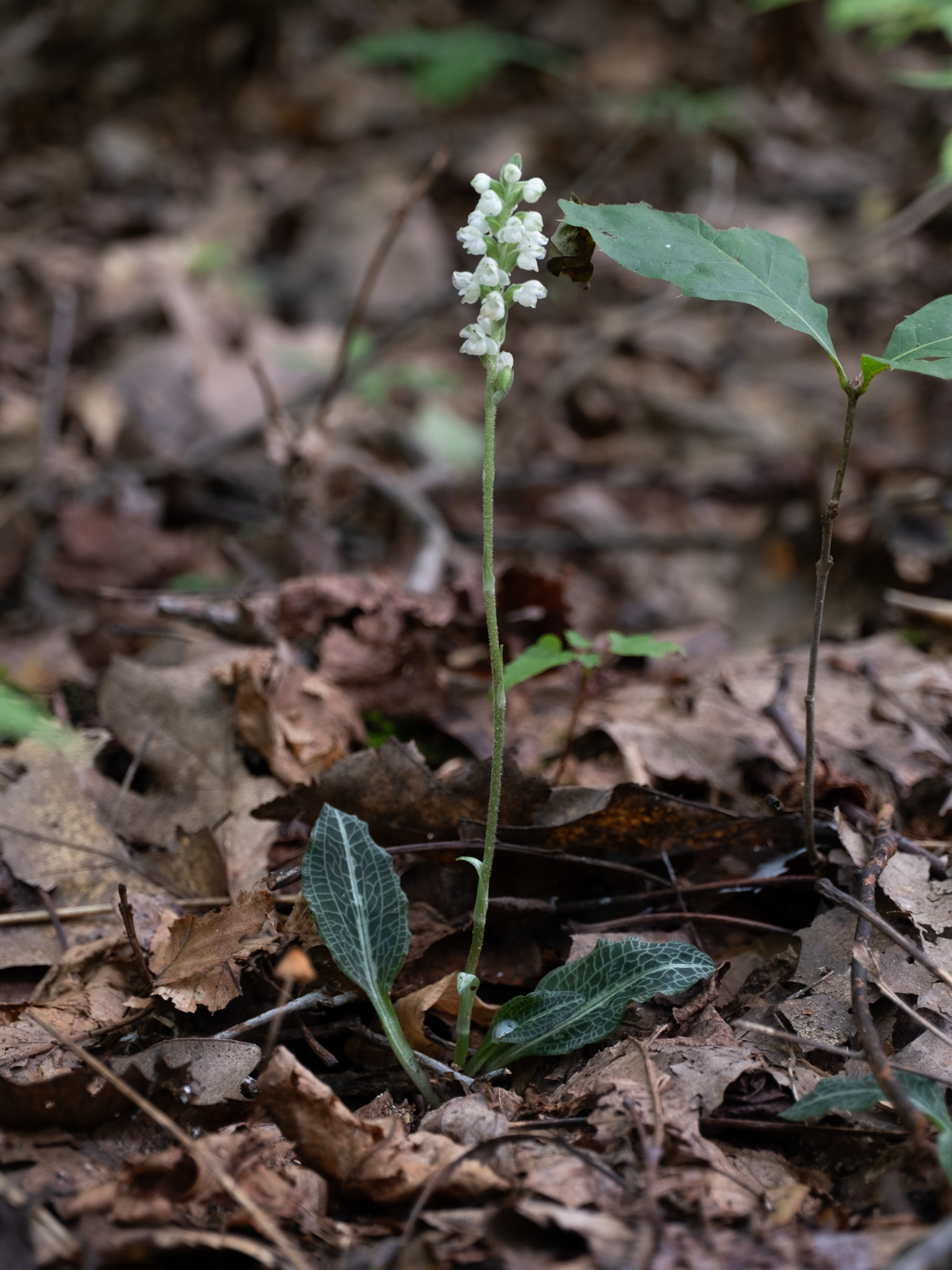

Conservation status
- Secure (NatureServe)

Scientific classification
- Kingdom: Plantae
- Clade: Tracheophytes
- Clade: Angiosperms
- Clade: Monocots
- Order: Asparagales
- Family: Orchidaceae
- Subfamily: Orchidoideae
- Tribe: Cranichideae
- Genus: Goodyera
- Species: G. pubescens

Binomial name
- Goodyera pubescens (Willd.) R.Br.

Synonyms
- Neottia pubescens Willd.; Orchiodes pubescens (Willd.) Kuntze; Peramium pubescens (Willd.) Curtiss ex Small & Vail; Epipactis willdenovii House; Tussaca reticulata Raf.; Goodyera pubescens var. minor Sims; Peramium tesselatum A.Heller

= Goodyera pubescens =

Downy rattlesnake plantain

Species of orchid

Goodyera pubescens, the downy rattlesnake plantain (also known as Peramium pubescens), is one of the most common orchids native to eastern North America. It is found from Florida to Nova Scotia, west to eastern Oklahoma, Minnesota and Ontario.

Goodyera pubescens is an evergreen terrestrial herb with variegated leaves. The variegation is in the form of a densely reticulated network of veins that are a much lighter green than the rest of the leaf tissue. It is a creeping plant that divides on the ground surface and sends out short stolons. It may be terrestrial or, occasionally, epipetric, growing on rock shelves. It prefers mildly to moderately acidic soils, such as in oak-heath forests.

== Description ==
Goodyera pubescens is a plant in the Orchidaceae (orchid) family that is commonly found in North America. The genus Goodyera are terrestrial plants with a fleshy rhizome with basal evergreen leaves in a rosette pattern - frequently having white or pale green markings. Inflorescences are in the form of a spike of small flowers, usually white with green or brown markings and have fragrant odor. Most of the plants, excluding and petals, are covered in small hairs. The primary difference between Goodyera and Spiranthes (A similar genus in the family Orchidaceae) is that Goodyera have elliptic leaves with white or pale green markings.

Goodyera pubescens flowers in mid July-early September with a small spike inflorescence of between 10 and 57 cylindric flowers. The leaves have the white-green marbling in the form of veins throughout, broadly elliptic to broadly ovate (2.1-6.2 x 1.3–3 cm), with either an acute or obtuse apex. The peduncle (stem that connects the stalk to a floret) is 11–35 cm long. Flowers: Lateral sepals 3.1 - 5.3 mm long with distinct petals of 3.6 - 5.7mm. The petals lip is scrotiform (pouch shaped) 2.5 - 4.2 x 2.2 - 3.5mm in size with the apex reflexed (bent outwards) with a slightly tuberculate (bumpy/rough) outer surface. The inner surface is smoother but has thicker veins throughout. The anthers are inflexed (bent inwards) within a cup-shaped clinandrium (an orchid structure beneath the anther). The white flowers are usually atop a leafless stalk.

There are similar species within the genus Goodyera that G. pubescens can be confused with. The Dwarf Rattlesnake plantain G. repens has smaller flowers that only have inflorescence on one side of the stalk. Both G. tesselata and G. oblongifolia are only found in Canada. Goodyera tesselata can be differentiated by its dull green leaves with much paler veins, G. oblongifolia leaves only have one primary vein compared to the more dense network of veins of G. pubescens. All of the rattlesnake plantains (Goodyera) are described as such because their venation resembles snakeskin.

== Distribution and habitat ==
Goodyera pubescens is found through much of the eastern part of North America, ranging from Florida all the way north to Ontario, going as far west as Oklahoma. (USA: AL, AR, CT, DC, DE, FL, GA, IA, IL, IN, KY, MA, MD, ME, MI, MN, MO, MS, NC, NH, NJ, NY, OH, OK, PA, RI, SC, TN, VA, VT, WI, WV; Canada: NB, NS, ON, QC.)

Goodyera pubescens thrives in mesic to dry forests. This species prefers well drained, slightly acidic soil with a somewhat high sand content. It requires a high amount of shade from shaded canopy or shrubs, but smaller shrubs can easily overtake it. High drainage is essential since orchids can have problems with the soil being over-saturated, often leading to the death of the plant. You can find this species growing in both dry and moist conditions, with a soil mixture of a sandy loam, or loam with a high clay content. It can also be found in deciduous or coniferous forests since they provide the necessary partial shade. Goodyera pubescens also functions as a National Wetland Indicator Species.

Wetland Status Codes
| Region | Status Code |
|---|---|
| Eastern Mountains and Piedmont | FACU |
| Atlantic Gulf Coastal Plain | UPL |
| Midwest | FAC |
| Northcentral & Northeast | FACU |

== Ecology ==
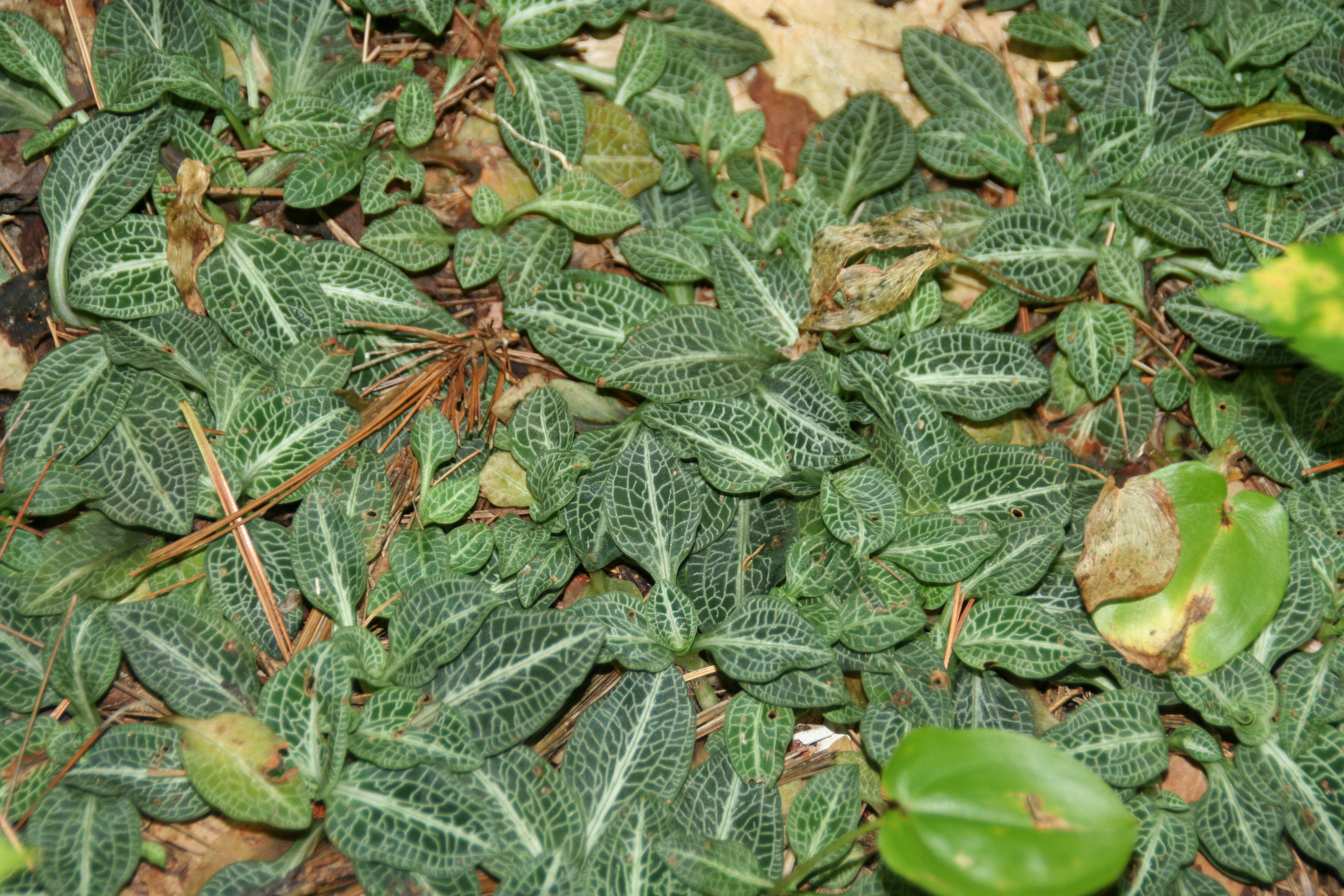
Goodyera pubescens along a mountain trail in central New Hampshire.

Compared to other orchid genera, Goodyera is fairly hardy, surviving more readily in colder conditions, being able to utilize a wider variety of nutrients, and thriving in more types of soil under more broad lighting conditions. Goodyera pubescens has a germination rate of over 90% even in very cold climates, which is why it is found in very cold climates such as the northern US and Canada. This species prefers loamy soils or humus, but it will also grow into decaying wood of Liriodendron tulipifera or Quercus alba with a preference towards woody substrates with a high amount of fungal activity. However, the rhizomes of G. pubescens cannot survive particularly harsh winters in the northern edge of its distribution.

Goodyera pubescens grows via a rhizome in a colonial pattern, flowering only once a year at maturity of 4–8 years of age. After flowering the root will have one to three offshoots which then generate new rosettes, creating offspring after the parent plant dies. Most G. pubescens individuals do not survive long enough to reach the age of maturity. The mature rosettes flower after being triggered by a dry period in the spring (usually in May) when there is higher than average temperatures. These specific circumstances may not occur in a season and can take several years to occur, explaining the long maturity time. White-tailed deer (Odocoileus virginianus) have a preference towards eating the leaves, rosettes, and inflorescences. As deer populations have increased over the last several decades, the number of rosettes per plant has increased to counter the number that get consumed by deer.

== Uses ==
Goodyera pubescens is largely just seen as a plant kept for visual aesthetic reasons in wildflower plantings due to its interesting leaf structure and resilience. It was once used historically as a medicinal plant by Native Americans for curing numerous ailments. The roots were made into a tea for treating lung inflammation/breathing pain and for snakebites. The leaves were used to improve appetite, cold treatment, kidney problems, joint pain reducer, or even for toothaches. The wilted leaves were used to cool burns, to deal with skin ulcers, or as a pain reliever. These are historical or cultural uses and are no longer currently recommended.

== Conservation status ==
This is one of the more common species of orchids found throughout the U.S., and for the most part is not considered threatened or at risk. The only places it is of concern are in Florida and New York. In Florida this species is considered endangered. In New York it is considered exploitably vulnerable.

== Taxonomy ==
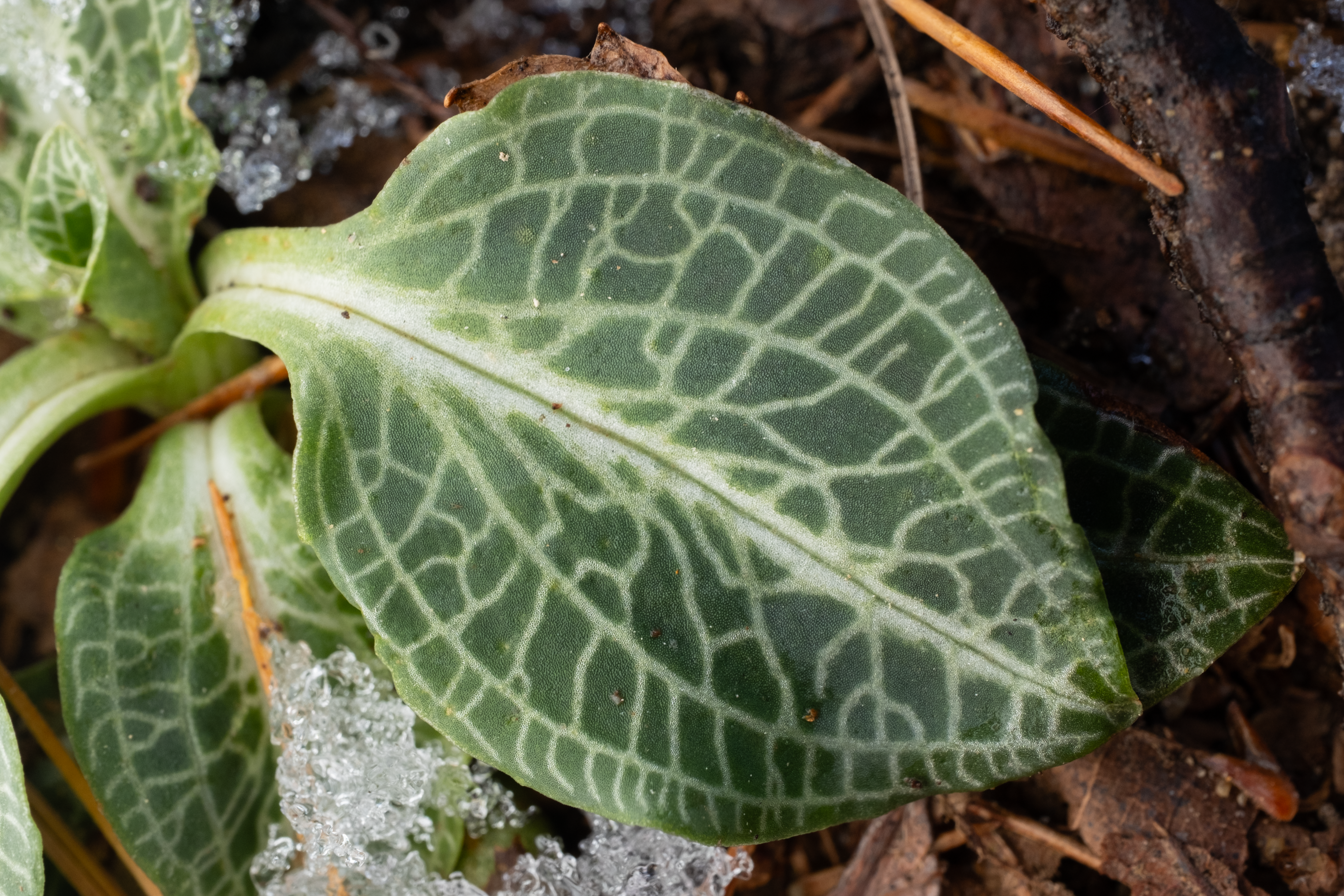
Goodyera pubescens leaf venation observed in Shenandoah National Park.

The genus Goodyera is also colloquially called the rattlesnake plantain. This is because of the snake-like venation pattern that this genus has on the leaves. Goodyera pubescens was first defined in 1813 in the Hortus Kewensis 2nd edition volume 5. Goodyera pubescens is the accepted name of this species, and the only legitimate name.

== Horticulture and cultivation ==
This orchid is of a desirable aesthetic to many gardeners, but keeping it alive in a non-wild setting is challenging. The infrequent sunlight, acidic soil, high fungal activity, and drainage required makes it difficult to cultivate in gardens. It is only found in specialty nurseries since taking it from the wild is not condoned and will likely kill the specimen.
