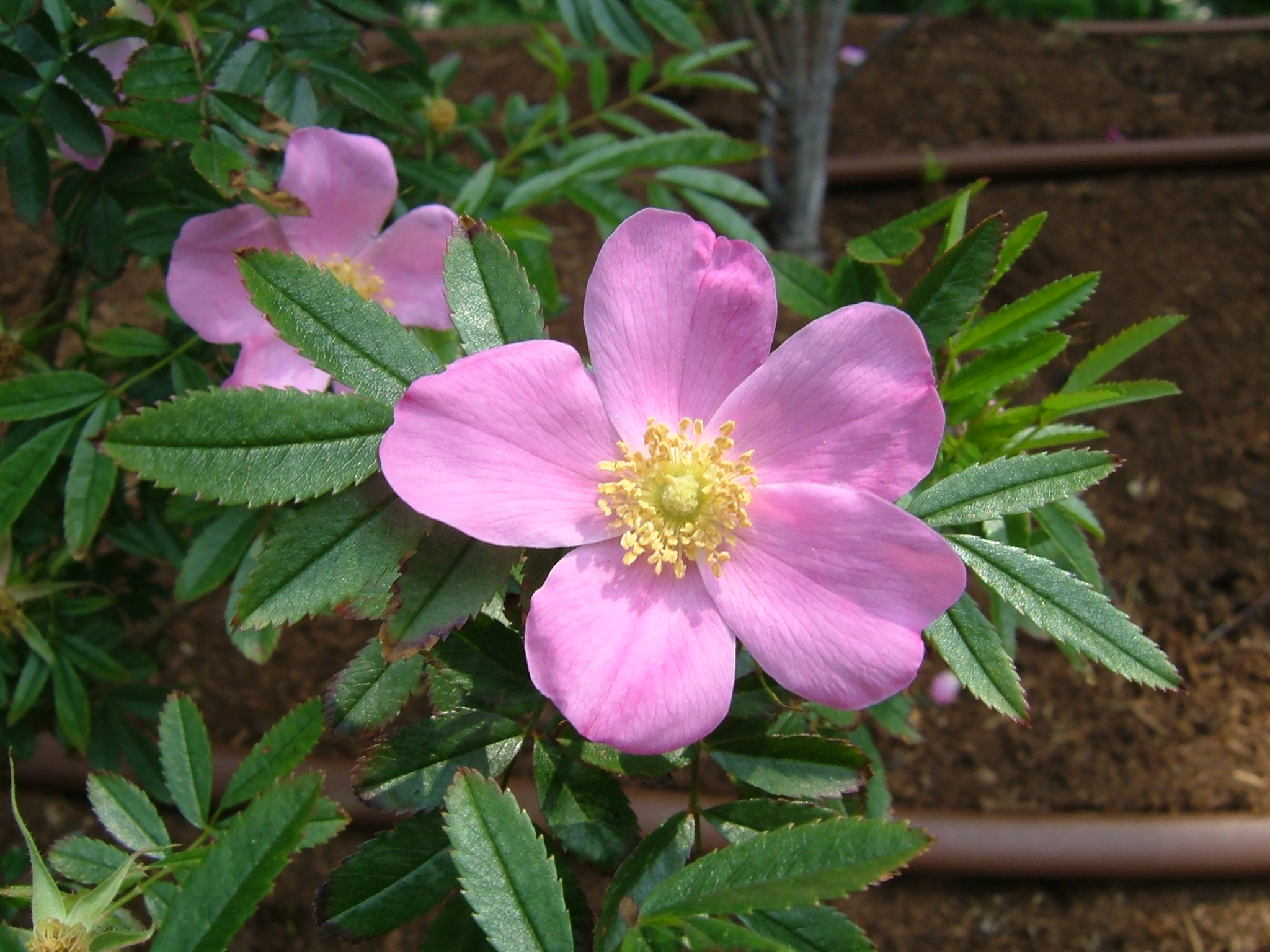

Scientific classification
- Kingdom: Plantae
- Clade: Tracheophytes
- Clade: Angiosperms
- Clade: Eudicots
- Clade: Rosids
- Order: Rosales
- Family: Rosaceae
- Genus: Rosa
- Species: R. nitida

Binomial name
- Rosa nitida Willd.

= Rosa nitida =

Species of flowering plant

Rosa nitida, also known as shining rose due to its glossy leaves (nitidus is Latin for 'shining'), is a perennial shrub in the rose family Rosaceae native to northeastern North America.

== Description ==
R. nitida forms a low, suckering, deciduous shrub, growing up to a meter in height, although often less. Its stems are thin and covered in fine bristles. Its pinnate leaves have 7 to 9 shining leaflets which turn bright red, yellow and purple in the fall. Its small pink flowers appear in summer and are subtly but sweetly scented, smelling like Convallaria ("Lily-of-the-Valley"). They are followed by small, round, red hips.

== Distribution and habitat ==
Rosa nitida is very hardy, tolerating temperatures as low as −40 °C (−40 °F), and will grow in a wide variety of soil conditions, including soils which are poor, acidic and waterlogged. In the wild it grows in bogs and by the edges of ponds. In the garden it is admired for its good leaf coloration in the fall.

R. nitida is known to hybridize with other Rosa species within its range. Hybrids between R. nitida and both R. palustris and R. virginiana have been identified in Nova Scotia and New England.

== Conservation status ==
R. nitida is designated by the IUCN Red List and NatureServe as a secure (G5) species globally. In Canada, the species is secure (N5) nationally. It does not have a definite national status in the United States due to the fact that it has not received a status rank in states it is native to. It is designated as an imperiled species (S2) in Vermont and has been possibly extirpated (SH) in Connecticut and Ontario. The table below lists the subnational ranks of the species in each Canadian province and U.S. state where it has received a designation.

Canadian and U.S. Provincial/State Conservation Statuses
Subnational Rank	Canadian Province	U.S. State
Imperiled (S2)		Vermont
Apparently Secure (S4)	Prince Edward Island, Quebec	
Apparently Secure/Secure (S4S5)	Island of Newfoundland, Nova Scotia	
Secure (S5)	New Brunswick	
Possibly Extirpated (SH)	Ontario	Connecticut
No Status Rank (SNR)		Maine, Massachusetts, New Hampshire, Rhode Island
