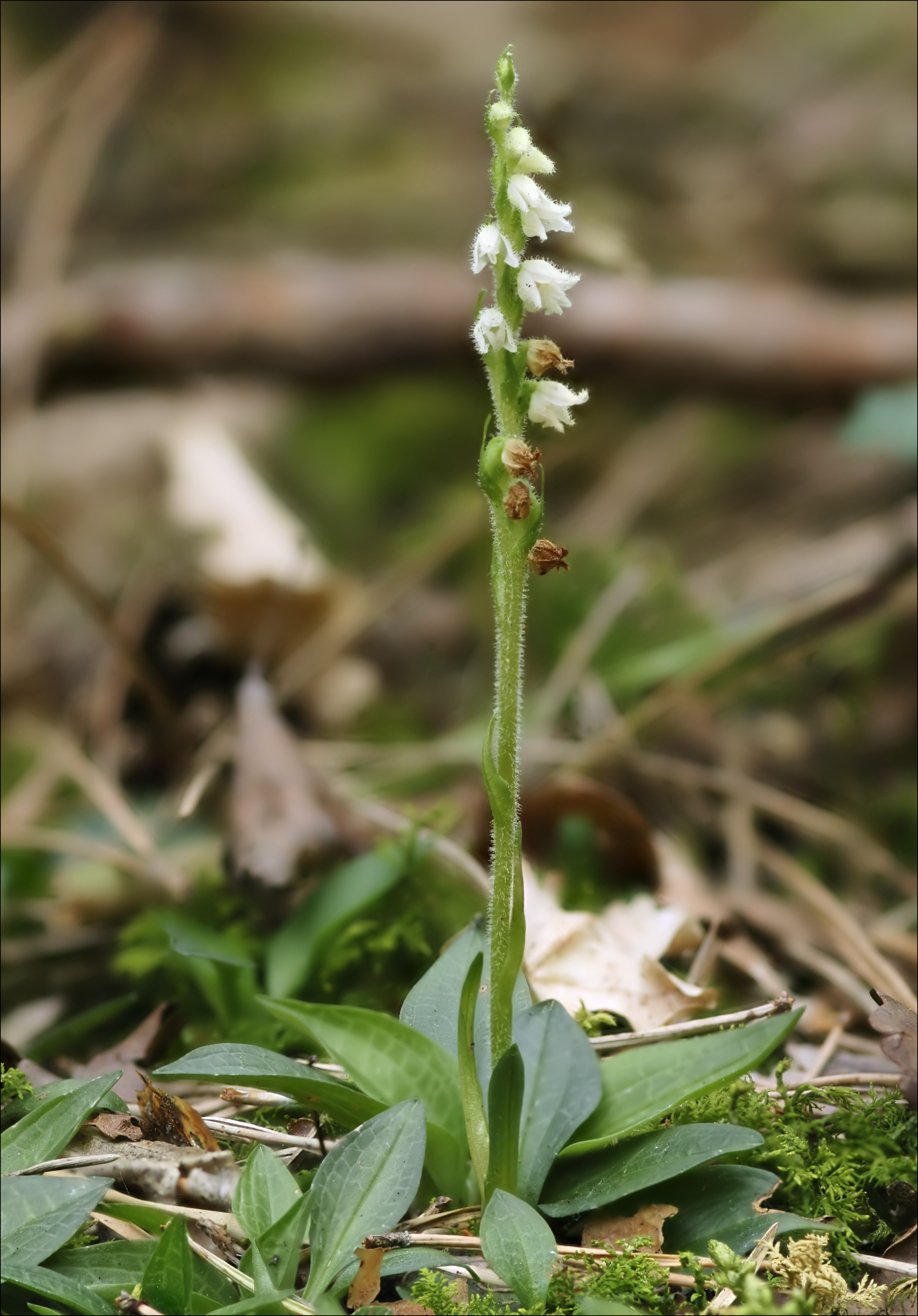

Conservation status
- Secure (NatureServe)

Scientific classification
- Kingdom: Plantae
- Clade: Tracheophytes
- Clade: Angiosperms
- Clade: Monocots
- Order: Asparagales
- Family: Orchidaceae
- Subfamily: Orchidoideae
- Tribe: Cranichideae
- Genus: Goodyera
- Species: G. repens

Binomial name
- Goodyera repens (L.) R.Br.

Synonyms
- List: Elasmatium repens; Epipactis repens; Gonogona repens; Goodyera pubescens var. repens; Neottia repens; Orchiodes repens; Peramium repens; Satyrium repens; Serapias repens

= Goodyera repens =

Creeping lady's-tresses Dwarf rattlesnake plantain

Species of orchid

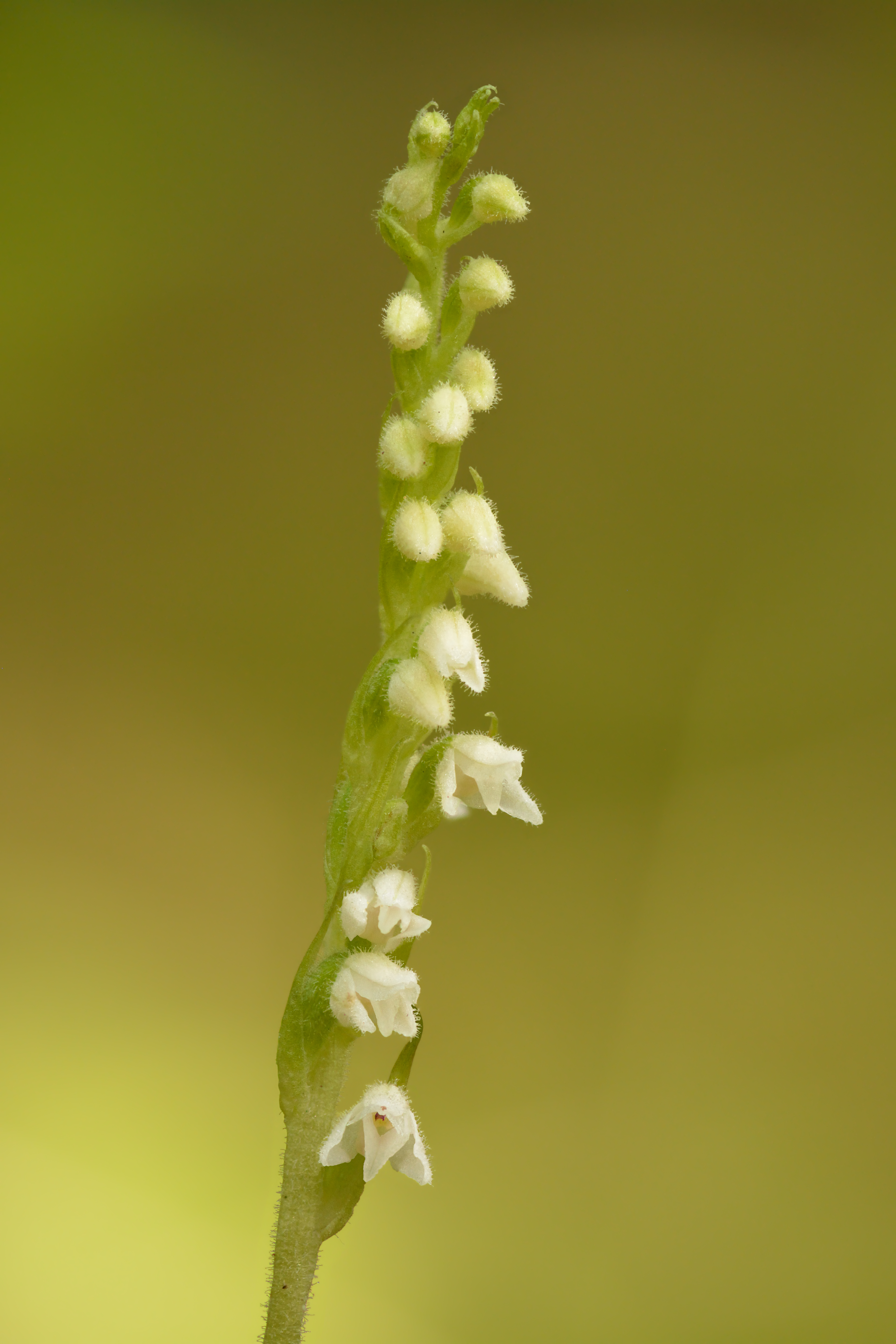
Inflorescence

Goodyera repens, a small forest orchid in the genus Goodyera. It is known by the common name creeping lady's-tresses in Anglophone Europe and dwarf rattlesnake plantain or lesser rattlesnake plantain in North America.

== Description ==
G. repens is a small, perennial orchid that emerges from short, shallow-rooted rhizomes.

The evergreen basal leaves are either widely or narrowly egg-shaped, with either a narrow or blunt point at the tip. They are 1.1 to 3.2 cm (0.4–1.3 in) long and 0.5 to 1.8 cm (0.2–0.7 in) wide. Each plant will have at least two leaves, but can have as many as six. Many plants in North America will have silvery white or greenish white tissue around the lateral veins, but in some populations especially in Europe and Asia these markings are faint or missing. Scale-like leaves are arranged alternately on the pubescent stem.

The inflorescence is a spike reaching 10–20 cm tall, with 7-36 small white or pale-green flowers arranged closely on one side of the raceme. The individual flowers have a concave, pouch-like labellum, and a curved hood-like petal over the column formed by the dorsal sepal and petals. Like other Goodyera species, the stem and sepals are covered in thin hairs. The flowers develop sequentially, with flowers on the bottom of the spike maturing first.

The fruit is a capsule, about 1 cm long, containing numerous tiny seeds (0.003 milligrams in weight) that are wind-dispersed. Each seed consists of an undifferentiated embryo surrounded by a transparent seed coat.

The period of flowering ranges from early-July to mid-September, depending on the latitude.

== Taxonomy ==
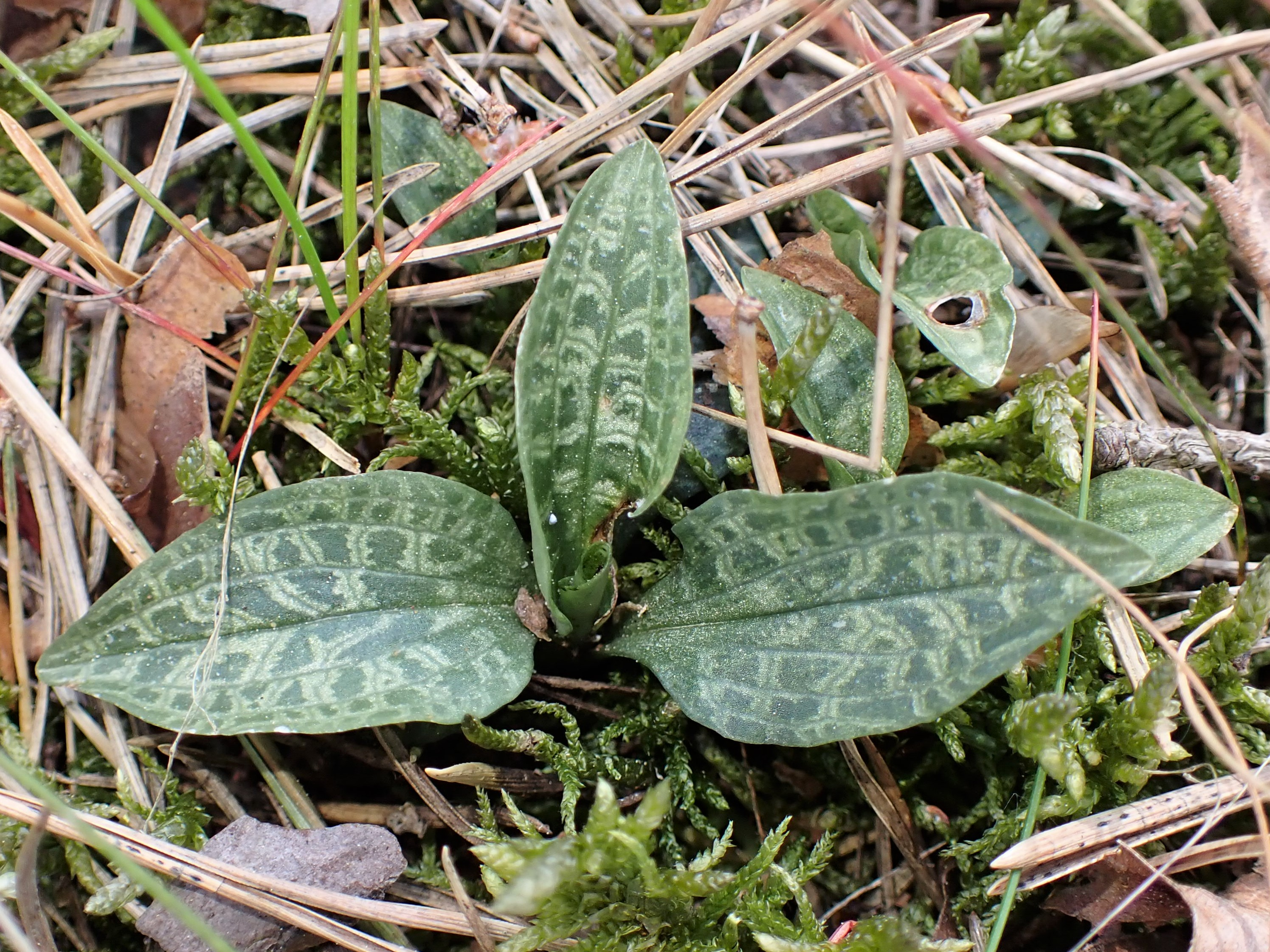
Basal leaves

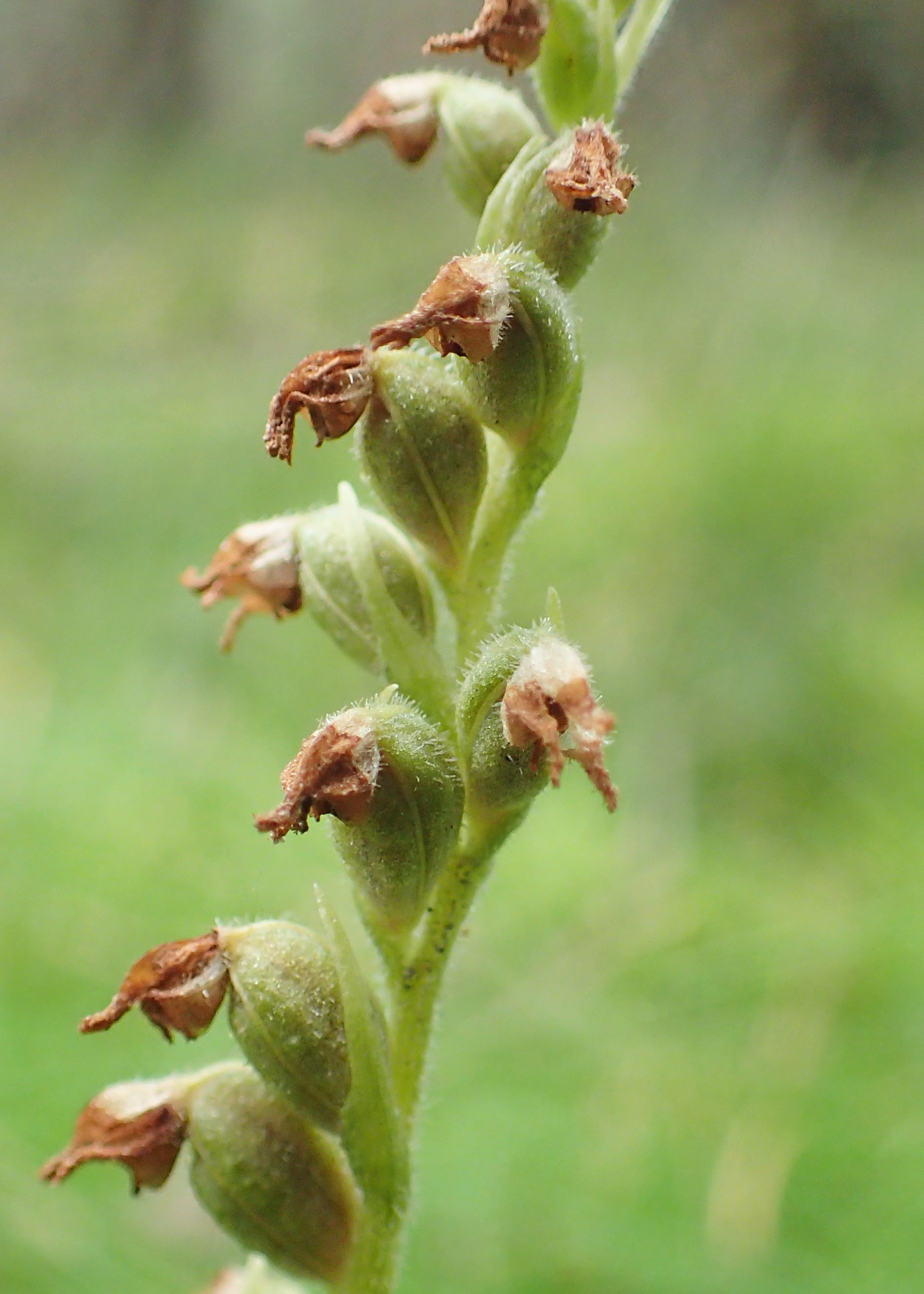
Fruits

Goodyera repens was named Satyrium repens in 1753 by Linnaeus. Many scientists since then have moved the species to another genus, but the accepted name was created in 1813 by the botanist Robert Brown when he moved it to a new genus he named Goodyera. With the rest of its genus it is classified as part of the family Orchidaceae. The species has no accepted varieties, but has 25 synonyms.

Table of Synonyms
Name	Year	Rank	Notes
Elasmatium repens (L.) Dulac	1867	species	≡ hom.
Epipactis chinensis (Schltr.) Hu	1925	species	= het.
Epipactis mairei (Schltr.) Hu	1925	species	= het., nom. illeg.
Epipactis repens (L.) Crantz	1769	species	≡ hom.
Epipactis repens var. ophioides (Fernald) A.A.Eaton	1908	variety	= het.
Gonogona repens (L.) Link	1822	species	≡ hom.
Goodyera brevis Schltr.	1922	species	= het.
Goodyera chinensis Schltr.	1919	species	= het.
Goodyera mairei Schltr.	1921	species	= het.
Goodyera ophioides (Fernald) Rydb.	1931	species	= het.
Goodyera pubescens var. repens (L.) Alph.Wood	1847	variety	≡ hom.
Goodyera repens var. japonica Nakai	1953	variety	= het.
Goodyera repens subsp. ophioides (Fernald) Á.Löve & W.Simon	1968	subspecies	= het.
Goodyera repens var. ophioides Fernald	1899	variety	= het.
Goodyera repens f. ophioides (Fernald) P.M.Br.	1995	form	= het.
Neottia repens (L.) Sw.	1800	species	≡ hom.
Orchiodes repens (L.) Kuntze	1891	species	≡ hom.
Orchiodes resupinatum Kuntze	1891	species	= het.
Peramium repens (L.) Salisb.	1812	species	≡ hom.
Peramium repens var. ophioides (Fernald) A.Heller	1900	variety	= het.
Peramium secundum (Raf.) House	1924	species	= het.
Satyrium hirsutum Gilib.	1792	species	= het., opus utique oppr.
Satyrium repens L.	1753	species	≡ hom.
Serapias repens (L.) Vill.	1787	species	≡ hom.
Tussaca secunda Raf.	1814	species	= het.
Notes: ≡ homotypic synonym; = heterotypic synonym

== Names ==
The genus Goodyera was named for British botanist John Goodyer. The species name, repens, means "creeping" in Botanical Latin. The species is known by the common names dwarf rattlesnake-plantain and lesser rattlesnake-plantain in North America, the rattlesnake part of the name referring to the scale-like patterning on the leaves of many species in Goodyera.

== Distribution and habitat ==
G. repens is widely distributed at northern latitudes, with native populations found in Europe, Asia, and North America. It is associated with undisturbed, old-growth conifer and mixed forests.

In North America, the species has a transcontinental range across Canada, with several discontinuous populations in the United States. The northern extent of its range occurs in Alaska, Yukon, and Newfoundland. In the eastern US, it extends as far south as North Carolina and Tennessee along the Appalachian Mountains. Disjunct populations occur in Arizona, New Mexico and Colorado.

Historically, its native range in Europe has been limited to the Eastern, Northern, and Central regions, with populations in Western Europe being restricted to areas of high elevation. In the last century, however, its range has expanded. Secondary populations have become established in Denmark, the Netherlands, northern France, northern Germany, and eastern England.

Goodyera repens is a protected species throughout most of its range. It does not survive fire, and does not soon reenter an area after fire or logging. It is generally found only in forests at least 95 years old.

== Ecology ==
Like other orchids, G. repens lives in symbiosis with mycorrhiza, rhizome-dwelling fungus (Ceratobasidium cornigerum or Rhizoctonia goodyearae-repentis). The mycorrhiza help the orchid absorb and assimilate nutrients. In its first heterotrophic and subterranean life stage, the plant is entirely dependent on these mycorrhizal fungi, as the tiny seeds contain only minimal amounts of energy reserves in the form of lipids.

Bumblebees are an important pollinator for this species. Mature flowers produce nectar and have exposed stigmas, which aid in the transfer of pollen. Hoverflies and halictid bees are also common pollinators.

== Human use ==
In North America, G. repens was used medicinally by several indigenous peoples. The Mohegans of Connecticut used the orchid to prevent thrush in babies. The Potawatami used the plant to treat ailments of the female reproductive system, stomach and bladder, as well as a treatment for snake bites. Some early European settlers in North America used G. repens to treat scrofula, eye infections, and as a demulcent.

== Conservation status ==
G. repens is designated by the IUCN Red List and NatureServe as a secure (G5) species globally. On a national and sub-national scale, the species is listed at higher risk in many areas of its native range.

In Canada, the species is nationally ranked as secure (N5), though its provincial rankings range from secure (S5) to imperiled (S2). In the United States, G. repens is ranked as an apparently secure or secure (N4N5) species nationally. State designations range from secure (S5) to critically imperiled (S1). With the exception of Massachusetts, the states with the most severe conservation assessments are those that occupy the species' far southeastern range. The species is designated as possibly extirpated (SH) in Connecticut and Maryland. The table below lists the subnational ranks of the species in each Canadian province and U.S. state where it has received a designation.

Canadian and U.S. Provincial/State Conservation Statuses
Subnational Rank	Canadian Province	U.S. State
S1		Kentucky, Massachusetts, Tennessee, Virginia, West Virginia
S2	Nunavut	Arizona, Pennsylvania
S2S3	Prince Edward Island	North Carolina
S3	Labrador	Montana
S3S4	Northwest Territories, Nova Scotia	Colorado
S4	Island of Newfoundland, New Brunswick, Yukon Territory	Vermont
S4S5	Manitoba, Quebec	New York
S5	Alberta, British Columbia, Ontario, Saskatchewan	
SH		Connecticut, Maryland
SNR		Alaska, Maine, Michigan, Minnesota, New Hampshire, New Mexico, Ohio, South Dakota, Wisconsin, Wyoming

Under the European red list of vascular plants, the species is listed as that of least concern (LC) for Europe as a whole. Individual European nations designate G. repens to be at higher risk of extirpation within their borders. In Sweden, for example, it is a red-listed species, classified as vulnerable (VU), and is legally protected under the Species Protection Ordinance.
