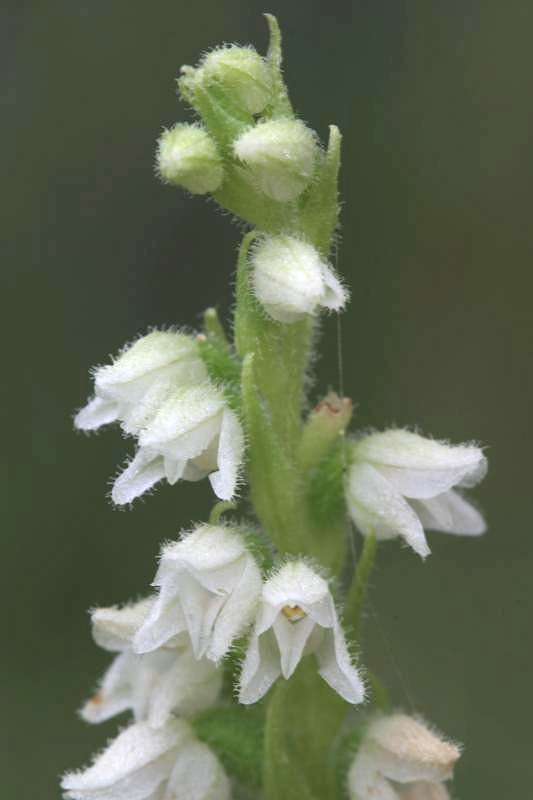
- Goodyera repens, commonly called "creeping lady's tresses"

Scientific classification
- Kingdom: Plantae
- Clade: Tracheophytes
- Clade: Angiosperms
- Clade: Monocots
- Order: Asparagales
- Family: Orchidaceae
- Subfamily: Orchidoideae
- Tribe: Cranichideae
- Subtribe: Goodyerinae
- Genus: Goodyera; R.Br.

Synonyms
- Elasmatium Dulac nom. superfl.; Allochilus Gagnep.; Bathiorchis Bosser & P.J.Cribb; Cionisaccus Breda; Cordylestylis Falc.; Epipactis Ség.; Eucosia Blume; Geobina Raf.; Georchis Lindl.; Gonogona Link; Leucostachys Hoffmanns.; Orchiodes Trew ex Kuntze nom. superfl.; Paorchis M.C.Pace; Peramium Salisb. ex J.M.Coult. nom. superfl.; Salacistis Rchb.f.; Tussaca Raf.

= Goodyera =

Genus of orchids

Goodyera, commonly called rattlesnake plantain, jade orchids or ladies' tresses is a wide-ranging genus of orchids in the tribe Cranichideae. About 100 species of Goodyera have been formally described. With a center of diversity in East Asia, Goodyera is found across Europe, Madeira, North and Central America, Australia, and on islands from the west Indian Ocean to the Pacific Ocean. They have a rosette of leaves at their base and usually many small white resupinate flowers. They are similar to orchids in the genus Spiranthes but can be distinguished from them by the shape and colour patterns of the leaves.

== Description ==
Plants in the genus Goodyera are mainly terrestrial plants with a fleshy, creeping rhizome and a loose rosette of leaves at the base of a flowering stem with many small, resupinate flowers. The leaves are elliptic, characteristically asymmetrical and green with white or pale green markings. The entire plant apart from the flowers is covered with slightly sticky hairs. The dorsal sepal and petals overlap, forming a hood over the column and the lateral sepals spread widely. The labellum is not lobed but has a small pouch. Orchids in the genus Spiranthes are similar but Spiranthes lack rhizomes, have flat, non-pouched labella, and display plain green leaves.

== Taxonomy and naming ==
The genus Goodyera was first formally described in 1813 by Robert Brown and the description was published in William Aiton's Hortus Kewensis.

Generic delimitation of Goodyera remains problematic, with some authors providing evidence to support a narrower circumscription of the genus.

The genus is abbreviated G. in horticultural nomenclature.

== Distribution ==
With a center of diversity in East Asia, Goodyera is found across Europe, Madeira, North and Central America, Australia, and on islands from the west Indian Ocean to the Pacific Ocean.

=== List of species ===
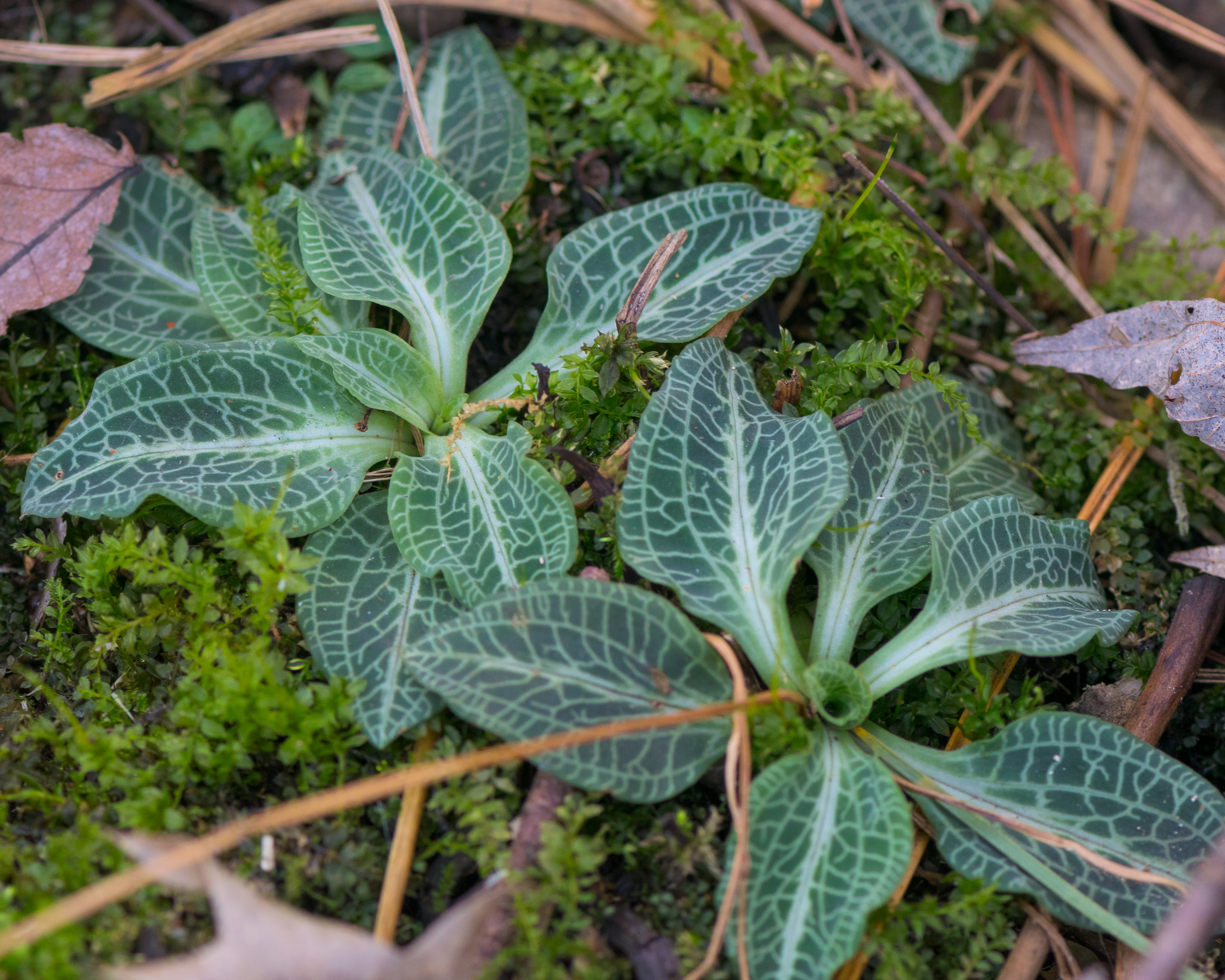
Goodyera pubescens

The following is a list of species of Goodyera recognised by Plants of the World Online as at May 2023:

- Goodyera afzelii Schltr.
- Goodyera alveolata Pradha
- Goodyera amoena Schltr.
- Goodyera angustifolia Schltr.
- Goodyera araneosa H.Z.Tian, Xiao X.Zhou & S.Zhou
- Goodyera beccarii Schltr.
- Goodyera bifida (Blume) Blume
- Goodyera biflora (Lindl.) Hook.f.
- Goodyera boninensis Nakai
- Goodyera brachystegia Hand.-Mazz.
- Goodyera bracteata Thouars
- Goodyera bradeorum Schltr.
- Goodyera clausa (A.A.Eaton ex Ames) Schltr.
- Goodyera colorata (Blume) Blume
- Goodyera condensata Ormerod & J.J.Wood
- Goodyera cordata (Lindl.) G.Nicholson
- Goodyera crassifolia H.J.Suh, S.W.Seo, S.H.Oh & T.Yukawa
- Goodyera crocodiliceps Ormerod
- Goodyera cyclopensis Ormerod
- Goodyera daibuzanensis Yamam.
- Goodyera denticulata J.J.Sm.
- Goodyera dolabripetala (Ames) Schltr.
- Goodyera elmeri (Ames) Ames
- Goodyera erosa (Ames & C.Schweinf.) Ames, F.T.Hubb. & C.Schweinf.
- Goodyera erythrodoides Schltr.
- Goodyera fimbrilabia Ormerod
- Goodyera foliosa (Lindl.) Benth. ex Hook.f.
- Goodyera fumata Thwaites
- Goodyera fusca (Lindl.) Hook.f.
- Goodyera gemmata J.J.Sm.
- Goodyera gibbsiae J.J.Sm.
- Goodyera hachijoensis Yatabe
- Goodyera hemsleyana King & Pantl.
- Goodyera henryi Rolfe
- Goodyera hispaniolae Dod
- Goodyera hispida Lindl.
- Goodyera humicola (Schltr.) Schltr.
- Goodyera inmeghema Ormerod
- Goodyera lamprotaenia Schltr.
- Goodyera lanceolata Ridl.
- Goodyera longirostrata Hayata
- Goodyera luzonensis Ames
- Goodyera macrophylla Lowe
- Goodyera maculata T.P.Lin
- Goodyera major Ames & Correll
- Goodyera makuensis Ormerod
- Goodyera malipoensis Q.X.Guan & S.P.Chen
- Goodyera marginata Lindl.
- Goodyera maurevertii Blume
- Goodyera × maximovelutina N.S.Lee & J.H.So
- Goodyera medogensis H.Z.Tian, Y.H.Tong & B.M.Wang
- Goodyera micrantha Schltr.
- Goodyera modesta Schltr.
- Goodyera myanmarica Ormerod & C.S.Kumar
- Goodyera nankoensis Fukuy.
- Goodyera nanshanensis Xi L.Wang & X.H.Jin
- Goodyera nantoensis Hayata
- Goodyera novembrilis (Rchb.f.) Ormerod
- Goodyera oblongifolia Raf.
- Goodyera ovatilabia Schltr.
- Goodyera pendula Maxim.
- Goodyera perrieri (Schltr.) Schltr.
- Goodyera polyphylla Ormerod
- Goodyera porphyrophylla Schltr.
- Goodyera procera (Ker Gawl.) Hook.
- Goodyera pubescens (Willd.) R.Br.
- Goodyera purpusii Ormerod
- Goodyera pusilla Blume
- Goodyera ramosii Ames
- Goodyera recurva Lindl.
- Goodyera repens (L.) R.Br.
- Goodyera reticulata (Blume) Blume
- Goodyera rhombodoides Aver.
- Goodyera robusta Hook.f.
- Goodyera rostellata Ames & C.Schweinf.
- Goodyera rostrata Ridl.
- Goodyera rubicunda (Blume) Lindl.
- Goodyera ruttenii J.J.Sm.
- Goodyera schlechtendaliana Rchb.f.
- Goodyera sechellarum (S.Moore) Ormerod
- Goodyera serpens Schltr.
- Goodyera similis Blume
- Goodyera stelidifera Ormerod
- Goodyera stenopetala Schltr.
- Goodyera striata Rchb.f.
- Goodyera sumbawana Ormerod
- Goodyera taitensis Blume
- Goodyera × tamnaensis N.S.Lee, K.S.Lee, S.H.Yeau & C.S.Lee
- Goodyera × tanakae Suetsugu
- Goodyera tesselata G.Lodd.
- Goodyera thailandica Seidenf.
- Goodyera turialbae Schltr.
- Goodyera umbrosa (D.L.Jones & M.A.Clem.) J.M.H.Shaw
- Goodyera venusta Schltr.
- Goodyera viridiflora (Blume) Blume
- Goodyera vitiensis (L.O.Williams) Kores
- Goodyera vittata (Lindl.) Benth. ex Hook.f.
- Goodyera wuana Tang & F.T.Wang
- Goodyera yamiana Fukuy.
- Goodyera yunnanensis Schltr.
- Goodyera zacuapanensis Ormerod
