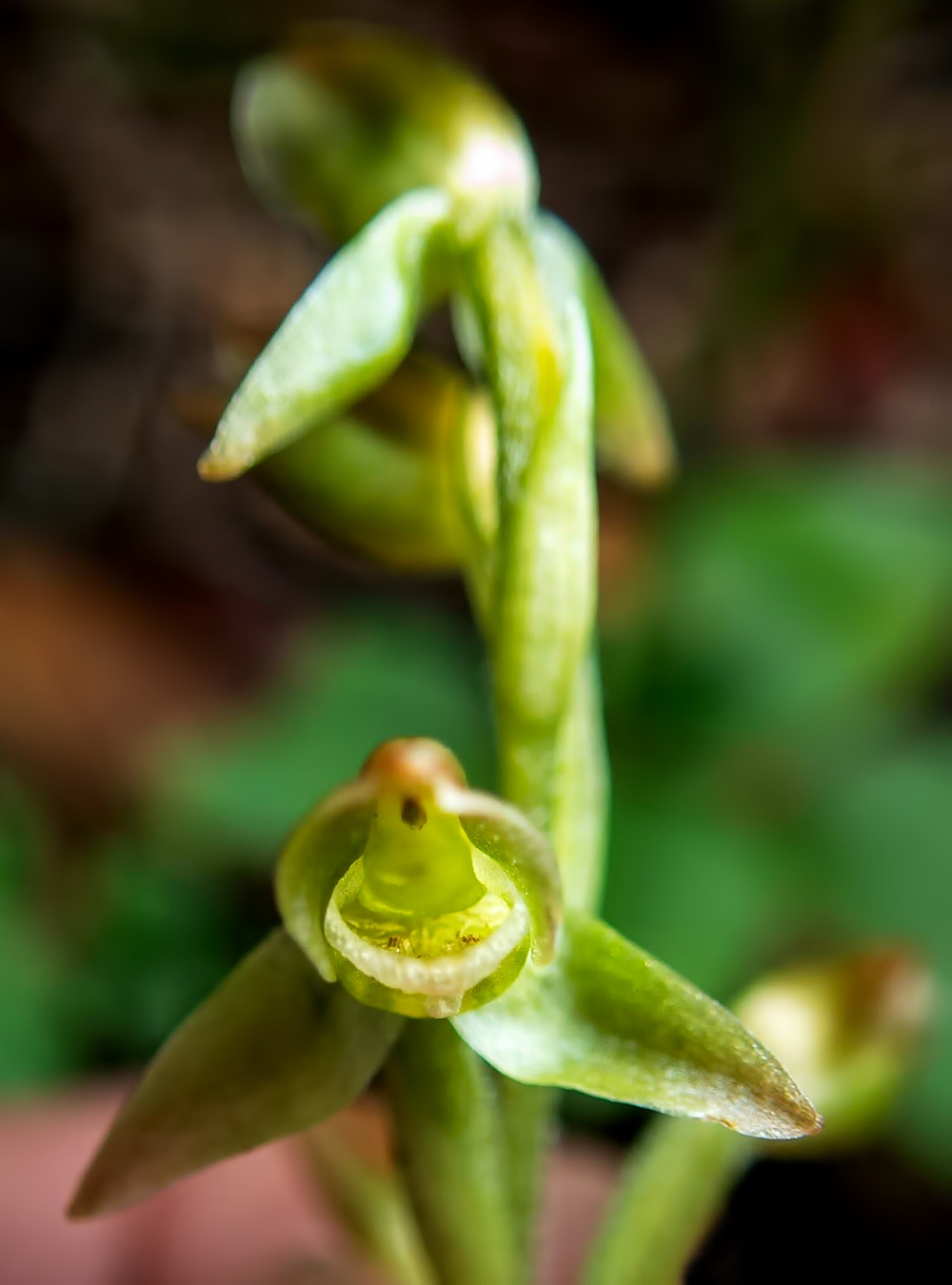
- Goodyera umbrosa near Mount Lewis

Scientific classification
- Kingdom: Plantae
- Clade: Tracheophytes
- Clade: Angiosperms
- Clade: Monocots
- Order: Asparagales
- Family: Orchidaceae
- Subfamily: Orchidoideae
- Tribe: Cranichideae
- Subtribe: Goodyerinae
- Genus: Goodyera
- Species: G. umbrosa

Binomial name
- Goodyera umbrosa (D.L.Jones & M.A.Clem.) J.M.H.Shaw

Synonyms
- Eucosia umbrosa D.L.Jones & M.A.Clem.

= Goodyera umbrosa =

Native jade orchid

Species of orchid

Goodyera umbrosa, commonly known as the native jade orchid or green jewel orchid, is a species of orchid that is endemic to northern Queensland where it grows in highland rainforest. It has between four and eight large, egg-shaped leaves and up to ten small pale green or pinkish flowers with the dorsal sepal and petals forming a hood over the column.

== Description ==
Goodyera umbrosa is a tuberous, perennial herb with a loose rosette of between four and eight shiny bright green, wavy, egg-shaped leaves, 30–80 mm (1–3 in) long and 10–30 mm (0.4–1 in) wide. Between three and ten resupinate, pale green to pinkish flowers, 8–12 mm (0.3–0.5 in) long and 10–15 mm (0.4–0.6 in) wide are borne on a fleshy flowering stem 200–300 mm (8–10 in) tall. The dorsal sepal is 7–9 mm (0.28–0.35 in) long, about 3.5 mm (0.1 in) wide and overlaps the petals, forming a hood over the column. The lateral sepals and petals are a similar size to the dorsal sepal with the lateral sepals spreading downwards. The labellum is hairy, broadly egg-shaped, 7–8 mm (0.28–0.31 in) long, about 7 mm (0.3 in) wide with a deep pouch. Flowering occurs from June to August.

== Taxonomy and naming ==
The native jade orchid was first formally described in 2004 by David Jones and Mark Clements who gave it the name Eucosia umbrosa and published the description in The Orchadian. Eucosia umbrosa is the accepted name at the Australian Plant Census. In 2014, Julian Shaw changed the name to Goodyera umbrosa, the name accepted by Plants of the World Online. The specific epithet (umbrosa) is a Latin word meaning "shaded".

== Distribution and habitat ==
Goodyera umbrosa usually grows in leaf litter and in rock crevices in rainforest between Mount Finnigan in Cedar Bay National Park and Mount Fox near Ingham.

== Gallery ==
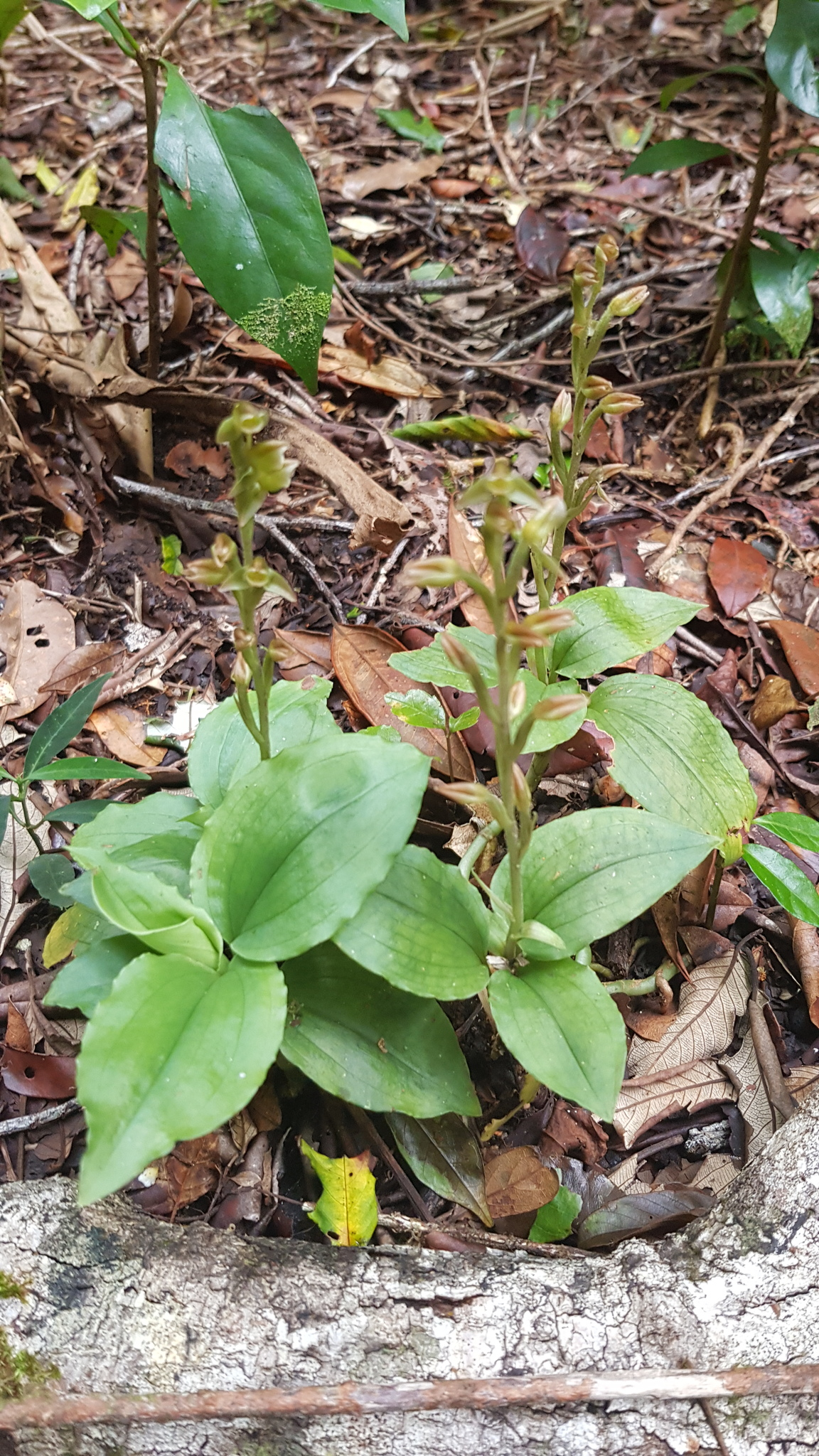
Cluster of flowering Goodyera umbrosa.
