= Yatabe =

Yatabe (written: 谷田部 or 矢田部) is a common Japanese surname. Notable people with the surname include:

- Katsuyoshi Yatabe (谷田部 勝義, born 1956), Japanese screenwriter, anime director and sound director
- Kotaro Yatabe (谷田部 洸太郎, born 1986), Japanese rugby union player
- Ryōkichi Yatabe (矢田部 良吉, 1851–1899), Japanese botanist

== See also ==
- Yatabe Domain, a former feudal domain of Japan
