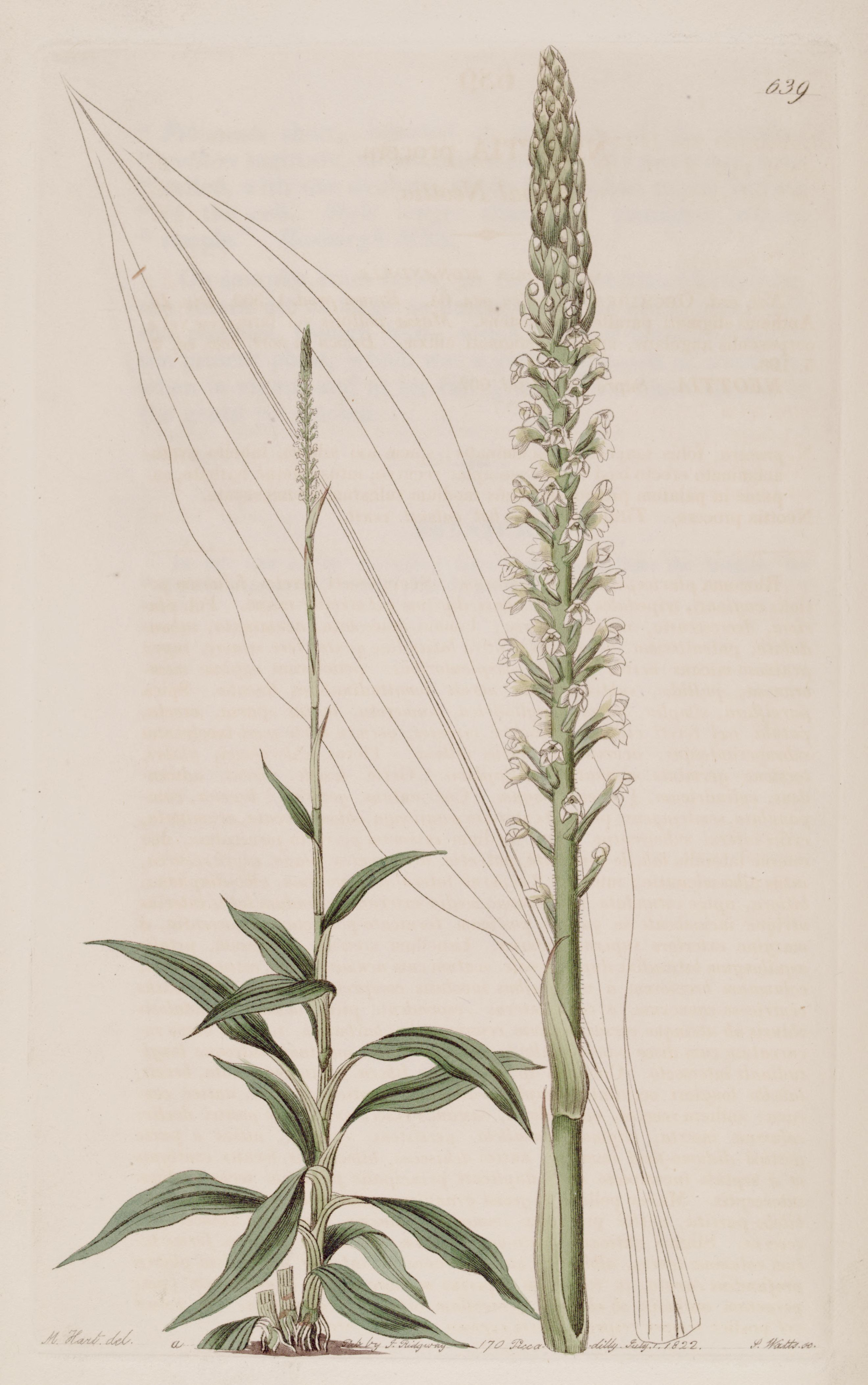
- 1822 illustration from Botanical Register

Scientific classification
- Kingdom: Plantae
- Clade: Tracheophytes
- Clade: Angiosperms
- Clade: Monocots
- Order: Asparagales
- Family: Orchidaceae
- Subfamily: Orchidoideae
- Tribe: Cranichideae
- Genus: Goodyera
- Species: G. procera

Binomial name
- Goodyera procera (Ker Gawl.) Hook.

Synonyms
- Neottia procera Ker Gawl. (1822) (basionym); Leucostachys procera (Ker Gawl.) Hoffmanns.; Orchiodes procerum (Ker Gawl.) Kuntze; Epipactis procera (Ker Gawl.) A.A.Eaton; Peramium procerum (Ker Gawl.) Makino; Neottia parviflora Blume; Cionisaccus lanceolatus Breda; Goodyera carnea A.Rich.; Cordylestylis foliosa Falc.; Spiranthes parviflora Hassk.; Goodyera parviflora Blume; Goodyera lancifolia Franch. & Sav.; Orchiodes parviflorum (Blume) Kuntze; Epipactis parviflora (Blume) A.A.Eaton; Epipactis philippinensis Ames; Goodyera philippinensis (Ames) Schltr.

= Goodyera procera =

Species of orchid

Goodyera procera is a species of orchid. It is widespread across much of Asia, including China, Japan, India, Thailand, Indonesia, etc.

Goodyera procera is a 20 to 40 cm tall plant with white flowers. It does not creep. Easy to grow under lights, 20 C to 30C. Grows well in an open medium like fine bark. Unlike many other Goodyeras, this one does not have patterns on the leaves.

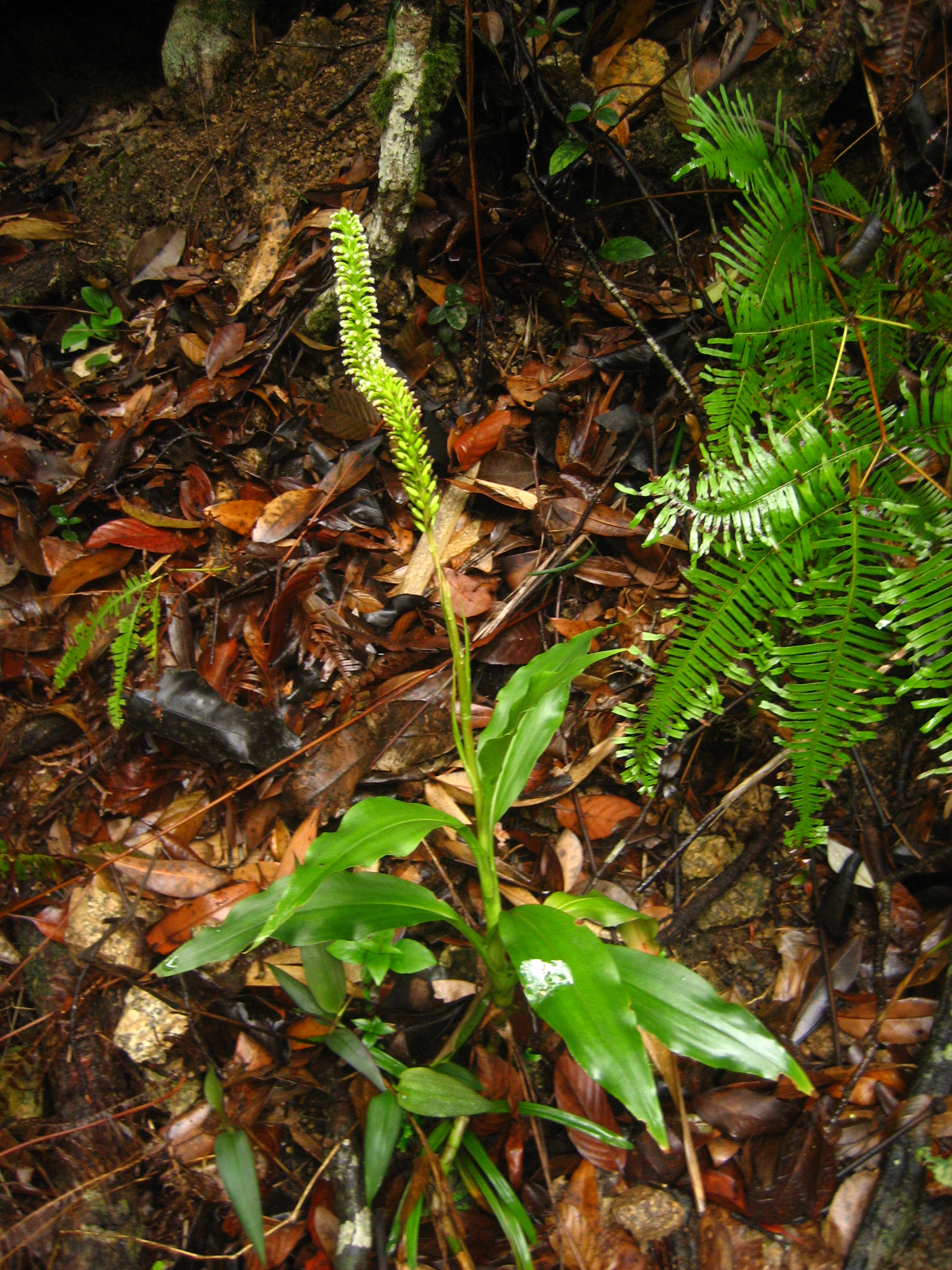
Taken in Shenzhen China.
