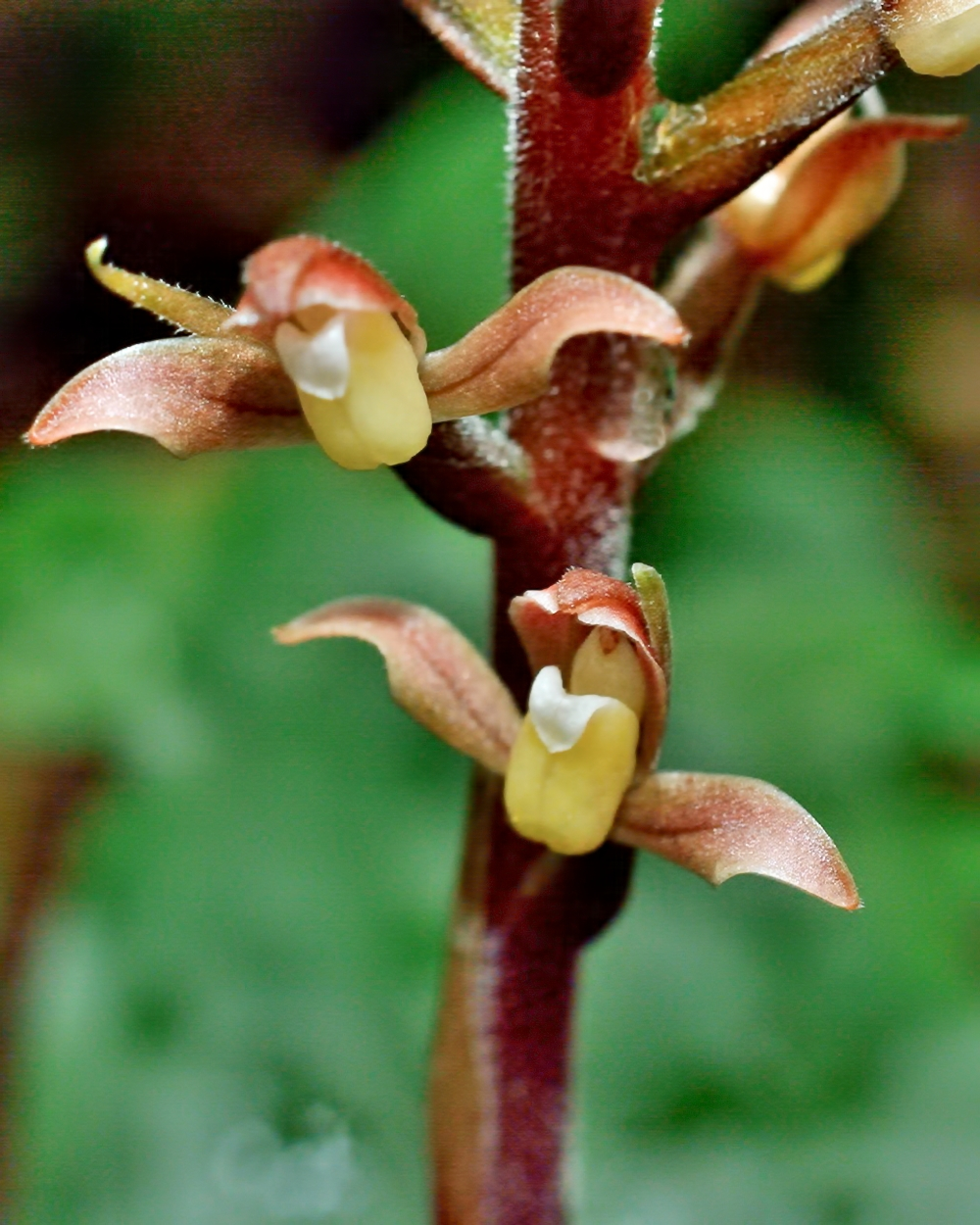
- Goodyera rubicunda

Scientific classification
- Kingdom: Plantae
- Clade: Embryophytes
- Clade: Tracheophytes
- Clade: Spermatophytes
- Clade: Angiosperms
- Clade: Monocots
- Order: Asparagales
- Family: Orchidaceae
- Subfamily: Orchidoideae
- Tribe: Cranichideae
- Subtribe: Goodyerinae
- Genus: Goodyera
- Species: G. rubicunda

Binomial name
- Goodyera rubicunda (Blume) Lindl.

Synonyms
- List: Epipactis rubicunda (Blume) A.A.Eaton; Georchis rubicunda (Blume) Rchb.f.; Goodyera rubens Blume; Neottia rubicunda Blume; Orchiodes rubicundum (Blume) Kuntze; Rhamphidia rubicunda (Blume) F.Muell. nom. illeg.; Salacistis rubicunda (Blume) T.C.Hsu; Epipactis grandis A.A.Eaton; Epipactis ochroleuca (F.M.Bailey) A.A.Eaton nom. illeg.; Epipactis papuana (Ridl.) A.A.Eaton; Epipactis triandra (Schltr.) A.A.Eaton; Goodyera anomala Schltr.; Goodyera celebica Blume; Goodyera clavata N.Pearce & P.J.Cribb; Goodyera confundens J.J.Sm.; Goodyera grandis (Blume) Blume; Goodyera grandis King & Pantl. nom. illeg.; Goodyera hispidula R.S.Rogers & C.T.White; Goodyera longibracteata Hayata; Goodyera longicolumna Hayata; Goodyera ochroleuca F.M.Bailey; Goodyera papuana Ridl.; Goodyera rubicunda var. amboinensis J.J.Sm.; Goodyera rubicunda var. australis Juswara; Goodyera rubicunda var. celebica (Blume) Schltr.; Goodyera rubicunda var. triandra (Schltr.) N.Hallé; Goodyera triandra Schltr.; Goodyera yaeyamae Ohwi; Neottia grandis Blume; Orchiodes celebicum (Blume) Kuntze; Orchiodes grande (Blume) Kuntze; Peramium longibracteatum (Hayata) Makino; Peramium longicolumnum (Hayata) Makino; Salacistis clavata (N.Pearce & P.J.Cribb) M.C.Pace; Salacistis ochroleuca (F.M.Bailey) M.A.Clem. & D.L.Jones; Salacistis rubicunda var. australis (Juswara) M.C.Pace; Salacistis rubicunda var. triandra (Schltr.) M.C.Pace; Spiranthes grandis (Blume) Hassk.

= Goodyera rubicunda =

Giant jewel orchid

Species of orchid

Goodyera rubicunda, commonly known as the giant jewel orchid, is a species of orchid that is native to parts of India, Asia, Southeast Asia, New Guinea, Queensland (Australia) and some Pacific Islands where it grows in damp forest and rainforest. It has between three and six large, egg-shaped leaves and up to ten dull pink and white resupinate flowers that are hairy on the outside.

== Description ==
Goodyera rubicunda is a tuberous, perennial herb with between three and six dark green leaves, 60–120 mm (2–5 in) long and 30–50 mm (1–2 in) wide, sometimes with a reddish tinge. Between ten and twenty resupinate, dull pink and white flowers, 6–8 mm (0.2–0.3 in) long and 7–10 mm (0.3–0.4 in) wide are borne on a brittle flowering stem 200–350 mm (8–10 in) tall. The dorsal sepal is 8–10 mm (0.31–0.39 in) long, about 3 mm (0.1 in) wide and forms a hood over the column. The lateral sepals are 8–10 mm (0.31–0.39 in) long, about 4 mm (0.2 in) wide, curved and spread apart from each other. The petals are 7–8 mm (0.28–0.31 in) long, about 3 mm (0.1 in) wide and almost translucent. The labellum is white or cream-coloured, 7–9 mm (0.28–0.35 in) long, 6–7 mm (0.2–0.3 in) wide with inward-pointing hairs on the inside. Flowering occurs from September to October in Australia.

== Taxonomy and naming ==
The giant jewel orchid was first formally described in 1825 by Carl Ludwig Blume who gave it the name Neottia rubicunda and published the description in Bijdragen tot de Flora van Nederlandsch Indie. In 1839, John Lindley changed the name to Goodyera rubicunda. The specific epithet (rubicunda) is a Latin word meaning "reddish", "ruddy" or "red".

== Distribution and habitat ==
Goodyera rubicunda grows in damp places in forest. It is found in China north-eastern India, Indonesia, Japan (including the Ryukyu Islands), Malaysia, New Guinea, the Philippines, Vietnam, Queensland and some Pacific islands.
