= Goodyera yunnanensis =

Scientific classification
- Kingdom: Plantae
- Clade: Tracheophytes
- Clade: Angiosperms
- Clade: Monocots
- Order: Asparagales
- Family: Orchidaceae
- Subfamily: Orchidoideae
- Tribe: Cranichideae
- Genus: Goodyera
- Species: G. yunnanensis

Binomial name
- Goodyera yunnanensis Schltr.

Synonyms
- Epipactis yunnanensis (Schltr.) Hu, illegitimate; Goodyera serpens Schltr.

Species of orchid

Goodyera yunnanensis is a species of orchid endemic to southern China. It has been reported only from the provinces of Yunnan and Sichuan, growing in forest scrub at elevations of 2,600–3,900 m (8,500–12,800 ft).

Goodyera yunnanensis is a terrestrial herb growing up to 23 cm (9.1 in) tall, spreading by underground rhizomes. Leaves are green with no white markings, elliptic, and up to 3.5 cm (1.4 in) long. Flowers are white or pale green, borne in a terminal raceme.
