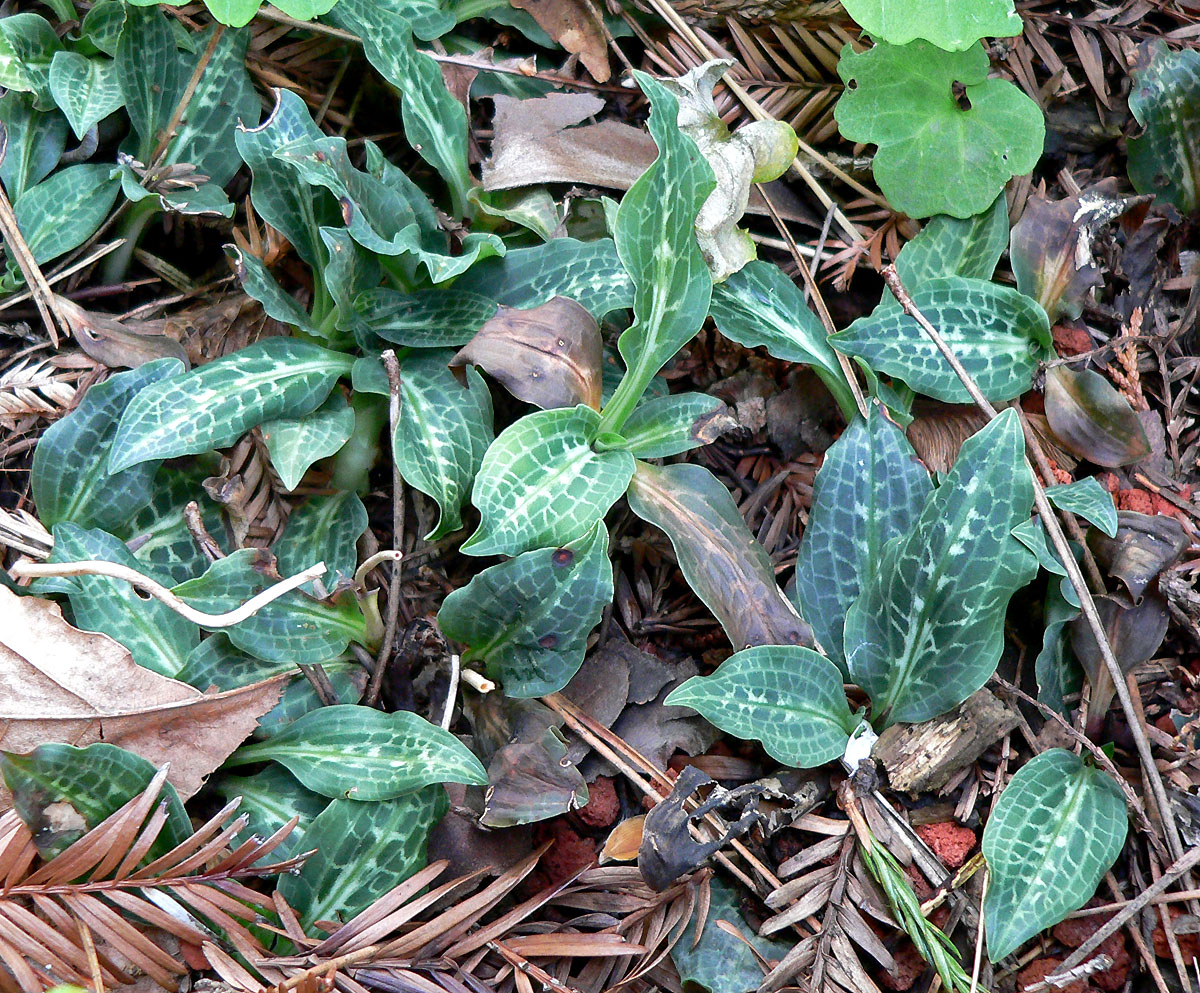

Conservation status
- Secure (NatureServe)

Scientific classification
- Kingdom: Plantae
- Clade: Tracheophytes
- Clade: Angiosperms
- Clade: Monocots
- Order: Asparagales
- Family: Orchidaceae
- Subfamily: Orchidoideae
- Tribe: Cranichideae
- Genus: Goodyera
- Species: G. oblongifolia

Binomial name
- Goodyera oblongifolia Raf.

Synonyms
- List: Epipactis decipiens; Goodyera decipiens; Goodyera menziesii; Orchiodes decipiens; Peramium decipiens; Peramium menziesii; Spiranthes decipiens; Tussaca oblongifolia

= Goodyera oblongifolia =

North American species of orchid

Goodyera oblongifolia is a species of orchid known by the common names western rattlesnake plantain and giant rattlesnake plantain. It is native to much of North America, particularly in the mountains of the western United States and Canada, from Alaska to northern Mexico, as well as in the Great Lakes region, Maine, Quebec and the Canadian Maritime Provinces.

Goodyera oblongifolia is most commonly found in mountain forests, often in the understory of conifers. This orchid forms a patch of broad lance-shaped to oval-shaped leaves at the ground, each 4 to 9 centimeters long. The leaf is dark green and in this species the midrib is streaked with white. There is often also white netlike veining on the leaf. The plant produces an erect inflorescence up to about 30 centimeters tall. The top of the inflorescence has many white orchid flowers which may all face the same direction on the stalk, or be spirally arranged about it.

The common name stems from the leaves, which have marks resembling snakeskin; the plant is also said to have been used to treat snakebites.

== Taxonomy ==
Goodyera oblongifolia was given its scientific name by Constantine Samuel Rafinesque in 1833. It is classified as part of the genus Goodyera within the family Orchidaceae. It has no accepted varieties, but the species has 10 heterotypic synonyms including one variety, one form, and eight species names.

Table of Synonyms
Name	Year	Rank	Notes
Epipactis decipiens (Hook.) Ames	1908	species	
Goodyera decipiens (Hook.) F.T.Hubb.	1923	species	
Goodyera menziesii Lindl.	1840	species	nom. superfl.
Goodyera oblongifolia var. reticulata B.Boivin	1951	variety	
Goodyera oblongifolia f. reticulata (B.Boivin) P.M.Br.	1995	form	
Orchiodes decipiens (Hook.) Kuntze	1891	species	
Peramium decipiens (Hook.) Piper	1906	species	
Peramium menziesii Morong	1894	species	nom. superfl.
Spiranthes decipiens Hook.	1839	species	
Tussaca oblongifolia Raf.	1833	species	
