= Subnational rank =

SRANK or Subnational Rank seeks to ascertain the rarity of species within subnational boundaries (such as a province or state).

Below is the ranking definitions used by the Ontario Ministry of Natural Resources, and will vary by province or state. This ranking system is widely used by the conservation data centres in each of the provinces and states. Refer to NatureServe for the overall ranking system used by conservation data centres (CDCs) across North America as well as the actual S-ranks of all the species evaluated. OMNR is one such CDC.

- SX — Presumed Extirpated Species or community is believed to be extirpated from the province or state. Not located despite intensive searches of historical sites and other appropriate habitat, and virtually no likelihood that it will be rediscovered.
- SH — Possibly Extirpated (Historical) Species or community occurred historically in the province or state, and there is some possibility that it may be rediscovered. Its presence may not have been verified in the past 20–40 years. A species or community could become SH without such a 20-40 year delay if the only known occurrences in a province or state were destroyed or if it had been extensively and unsuccessfully looked for. The SH rank is reserved for species or communities for which some effort has been made to relocate occurrences, rather than simply using this status for all elements not known from verified extant occurrences.
- S1 — Critically Imperiled Critically imperiled in the province or state because of extreme rarity (often 5 or fewer occurrences) or because of some factor(s) such as very steep declines making it especially vulnerable to extirpation from the province or state.
- S2 — Imperiled Imperiled in the province or state because of rarity due to very restricted range, very few populations (often 20 or fewer), steep declines, or other factors making it very vulnerable to extirpation from the province or state.
- S3 — Vulnerable Vulnerable in the province or state due to a restricted range, relatively few populations (often 80 or fewer), recent and widespread declines, or other factors making it vulnerable to extirpation.
- S4 — Apparently Secure Uncommon but not rare; some cause for long-term concern due to declines or other factors.
- S5 — Secure Common, widespread, and abundant in the state or province.
- SNR — Unranked Province or state conservation status not yet assessed.
- SU — Unrankable Currently unrankable due to lack of information or due to substantially conflicting information about status or trends.
- SNA — Not Applicable A conservation status rank is not applicable because the species is not a suitable target for conservation activities.
- S#S# — Range Rank A numeric range rank (e.g., S2S3) is used to indicate any range of uncertainty about the status of the species or community. Ranges cannot skip more than one rank (e.g., SU is used rather than S1S4).

A similar ranking system is used for the "G-ranks" and "N-ranks" which are the Global (G) and National (N) status ranks for species. Again refer to NatureServe.org for additional details.
