= Ryōkichi Yatabe =

Japanese botanist and poet

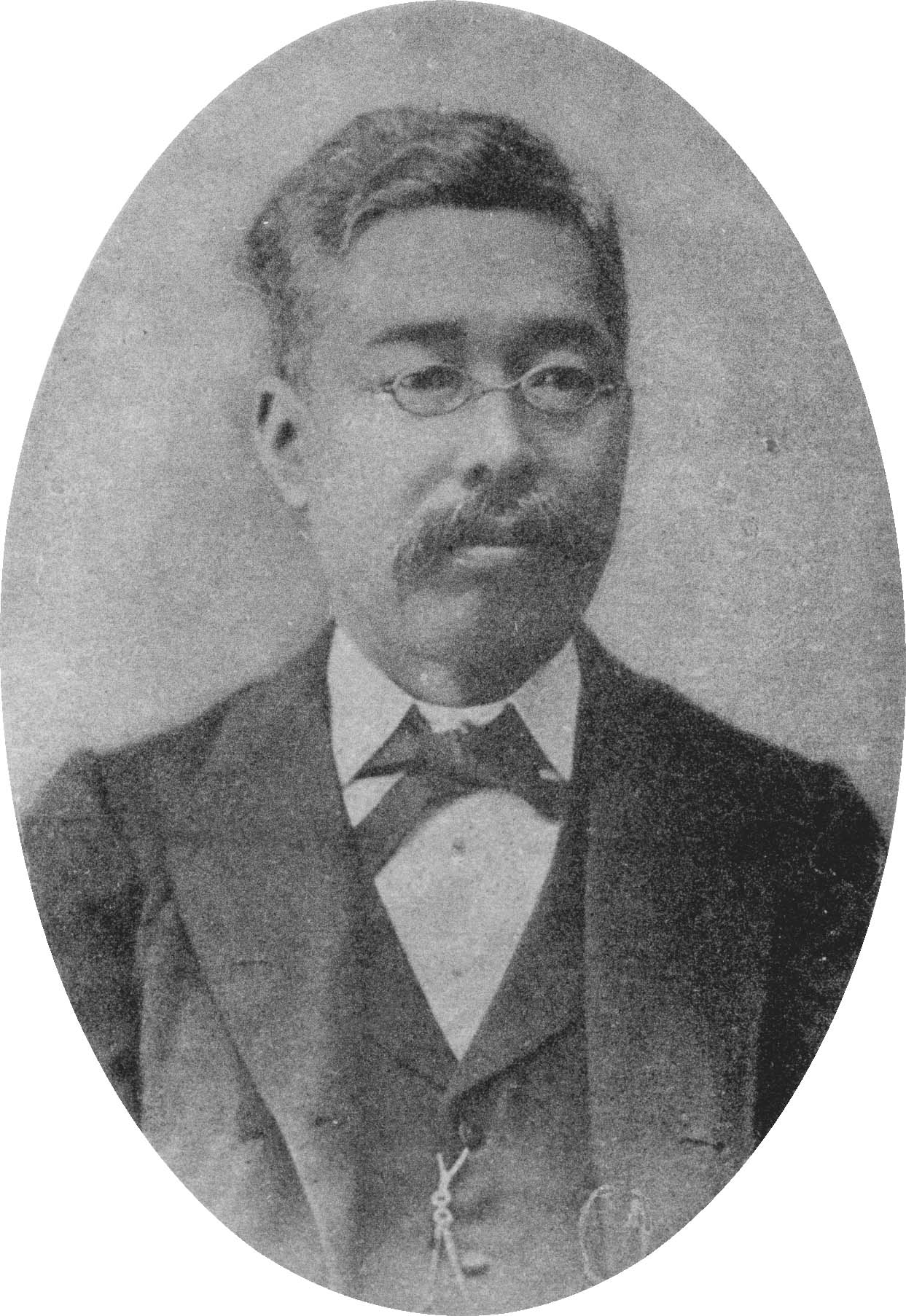
- Yatabe Ryokichi, director of the Higher Normal School
- Born: October 13, 1851; Izunokuni, Japan
- Died: August 8, 1899 (aged 47); Kamakura, Japan
- Education: Cornell University
- Scientific career
- Fields: Botany
- Workplaces: University of Tokyo
- Author abbrev. (botany): Yatabe

Ryōkichi Yatabe (矢田部良吉; October 13, 1851 – August 8, 1899) was a Japanese botanist during the Meiji era.

== Biography ==
Born in Japan, Yatabe attended Cornell University in 1871. In 1876, he became Cornell's first Japanese graduate. He returned to Japan as the first professor of botany at the University of Tokyo, as well as the director of the botanical gardens. In 1882, he was a founding member of the Botanical Society of Japan, and its journal, the Botanical Magazine of Tokyo. In 1886, Yatabe led the development of teacher training in Japan as principal of the higher teaching college at the University of Tokyo.

In 1899, Yatabe drowned while on summer vacation off the coast of Kamakura.

== Legacy ==
Yatabe is commemorated by the genus Yatabea.

Psychologist Tatsuro Yatabe was his son.

== Publications ==
- Iconographia Florae Japonicae or Descriptions with figures of plants indigenous to Japan, small 4to., Tokyo.

Vol I., part I., pp. 66: Cruciferae, Saxifrageao, Rubiaceae, Compositae, Primulaceae, Acanthaceae, Labiatae, Aristolochaceae, Orchideae, Liliaceae, etc. With plates 1-20, 1891.
Vol I., part II., pp. 111-165: Ronunculaceae, Berberideae, Caryophyleae, Geraniaceae, Rosaceae, Saxifrageao, Umbelliferae, Rubiaceae, Ericaceae, Styraceae, Solanaceae, Gesneraceae, Thymelaeaceae, Liliaceae, Uritinia, Gelidiaceae, Ulvaceae. With plates 31-40 1892.
Vol I., part III., pp. 167-252 Caryophyeleas, Ternstraemiaceae, Saxifrageao, Compositae, Gesneraceae, Aristolochiaeae, Laurineae, Orchideae, and Liliaceae. With plates 41-60, 1893.

Yatabe published nothing more. All descriptions are in Japanese, only the title and the names of the plants are in English.
