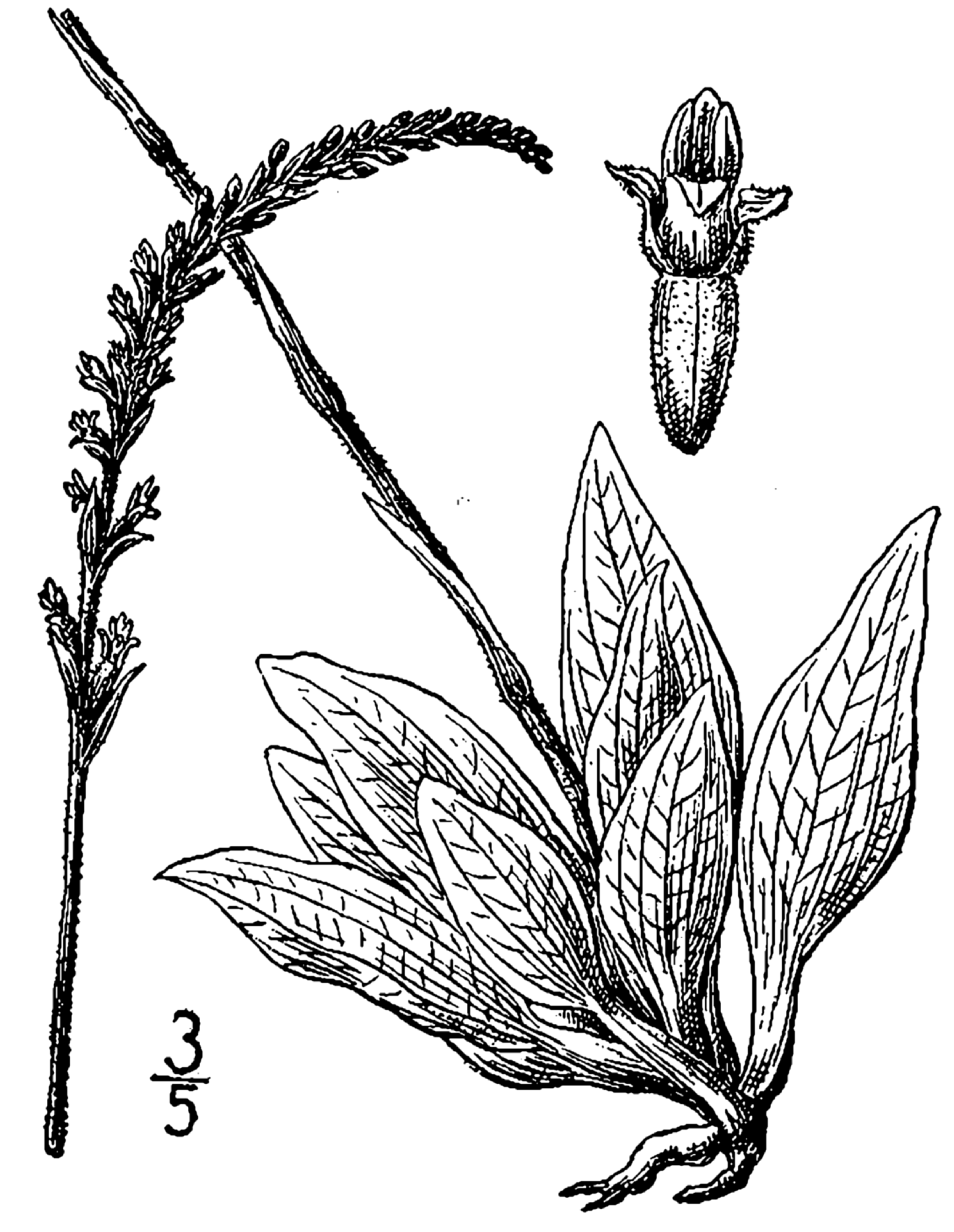
- 1913 illustration

Conservation status
- Secure (NatureServe)
- CITES Appendix II

Scientific classification
- Kingdom: Plantae
- Clade: Tracheophytes
- Clade: Angiosperms
- Clade: Monocots
- Order: Asparagales
- Family: Orchidaceae
- Subfamily: Orchidoideae
- Tribe: Cranichideae
- Genus: Goodyera
- Species: G. tesselata

Binomial name
- Goodyera tesselata Lodd.

Synonyms
- Peramium tesselatum (Lodd.) A. Heller; Orchiodes tesselatum (Lodd.) Kuntze; Epipactis tesselata (Lodd.) A.A. Eaton; Goodyera repens var. tesselata (Lodd.) B. Boivin

= Goodyera tesselata =

Checkered rattlesnake plantain

Species of orchid

Goodyera tesselata is a plant in the orchid family (Orchidaceae), called by the common name checkered rattlesnake plantain. It is native to eastern Canada from Manitoba to Newfoundland, and to the northeastern United States from Maine to Maryland, west to Minnesota.

Goodyera tesselata has low basal leaves with white reticulated lines. The inflorescence is an upright stalk with small white flowers.

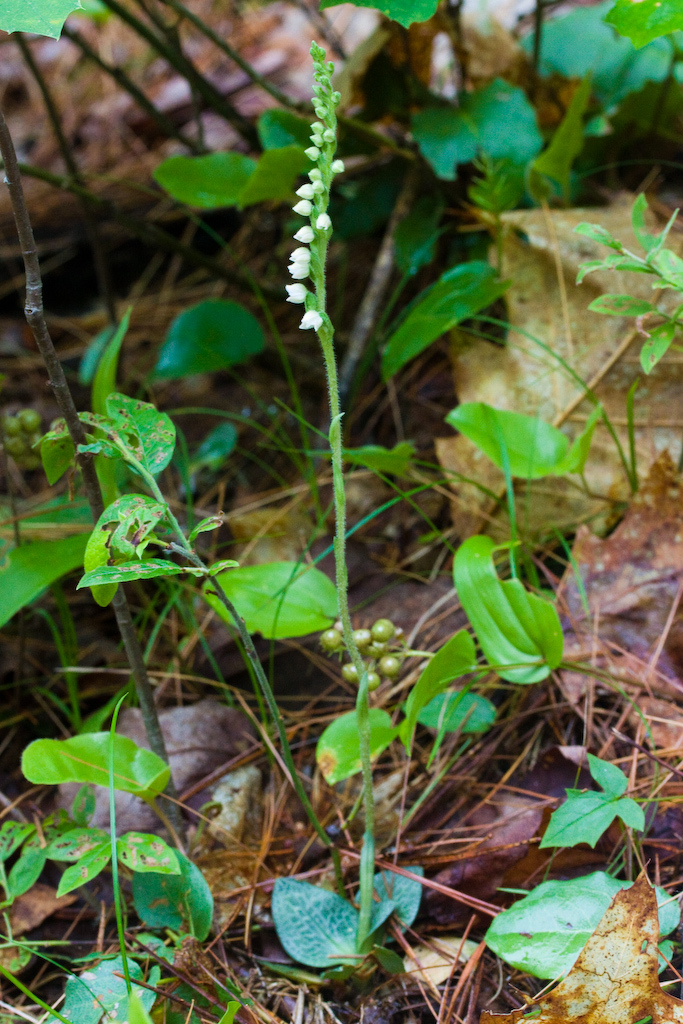
plant form

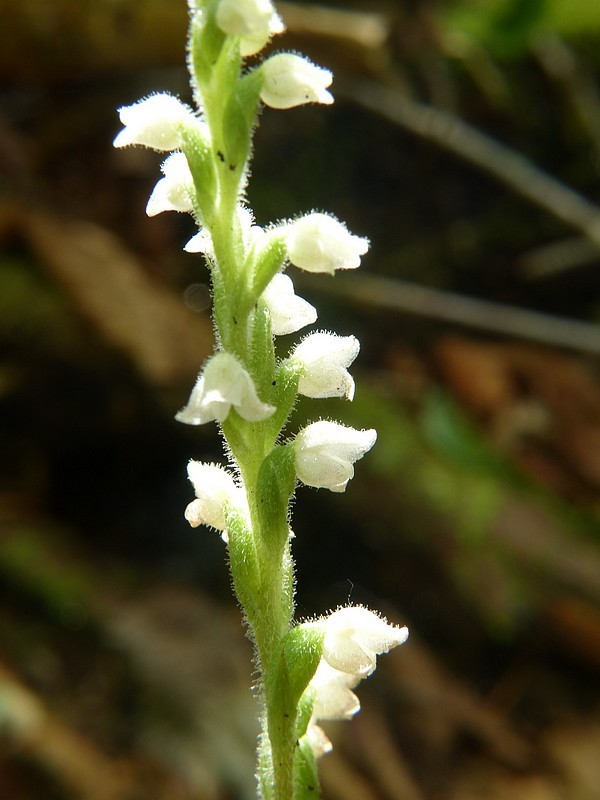
flowers

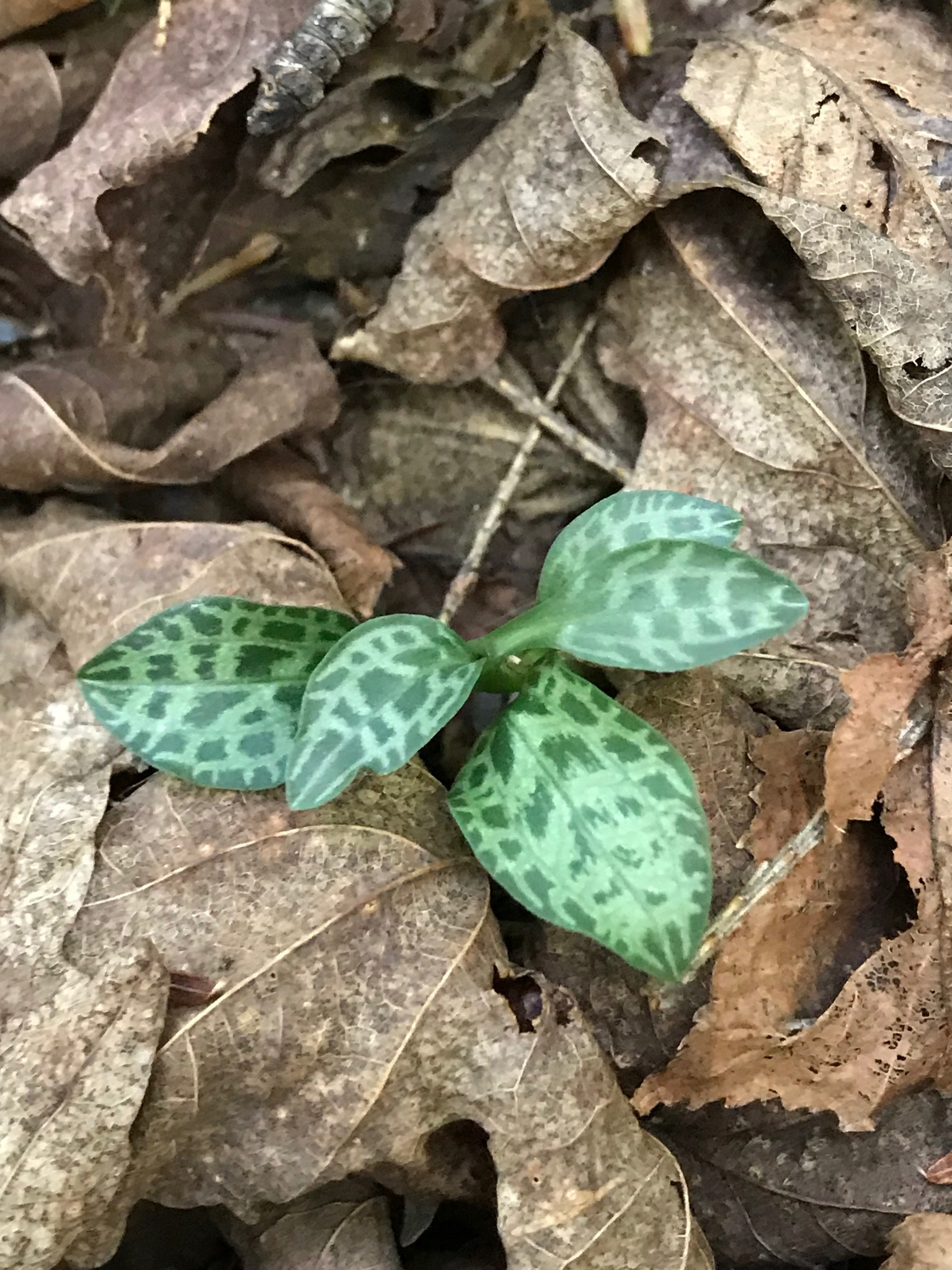
leaves
