= Manasota =

Manasota may refer to:

== Places ==
- Manasota, Florida, a community in Sarasota County, Florida
- Manasota Key, Florida, a census-designated place in Charlotte County, Florida
- Manasota Scrub Preserve, an area of protected land in Sarasota County, Florida

== Other uses ==
- Manasota culture, an archaeological culture of southwestern Florida
- Manasota Key Offshore, an underwater archaeological site in the Gulf of Mexico
