= Environmentally Sensitive Lands Protection Program =

Land acquisition program

The Environmentally Sensitive Lands Protection Program (ESLPP) is a land acquisition program in Sarasota County, Florida dedicated to acquiring and preserving the natural Florida habitat within the county.

== History ==
The program is funded by taxes and was approved by voters in a referendum in March 1999. The initial referendum allowed the county to collect 0.25 mil (25 cents for every $1,000 of taxable value) in ad valorem tax through 2019 which was used for the acquisition, protection, and management of environmentally sensitive lands. A second referendum was approved by voters in November 2005, extending the program to 2029, and included neighborhood parkland acquisitions. This expanded the program to have a Neighborhood Parkland Acquisition Program (NPP). The county also acquires land through other means, such as grants, donations, partnerships, and conservation easements.

The program's first purchase was 108 acres (44 ha) of land at the intersection of State Road 776 and Manasota Beach Road in 2000, which developed into Manasota Scrub Preserve. As of May 2021, 37,477.35 acres (15,166.55 ha) have been acquired through the ESLPP program.

== List of land bought by ESLPP funds ==
- Circus Hammock
- Curry Creek Preserve
- Deer Prairie Creek Preserve
- Lemon Bay Preserve
- Manasota Scrub Preserve
- Old Miakka Preserve
- Pocono Trail Preserve
- Red Bug Slough Preserve
- Sleeping Turtles Preserve
- Warm Mineral Springs

== See also ==
- Environmentally Endangered Lands Programs
- Florida Forever
- List of sites in the South section of the Great Florida Birding Trail
