= Windover Archeological Site =

Place in Florida listed on National Register of Historic Places

- U.S. National Register of Historic Places
- U.S. National Historic Landmark
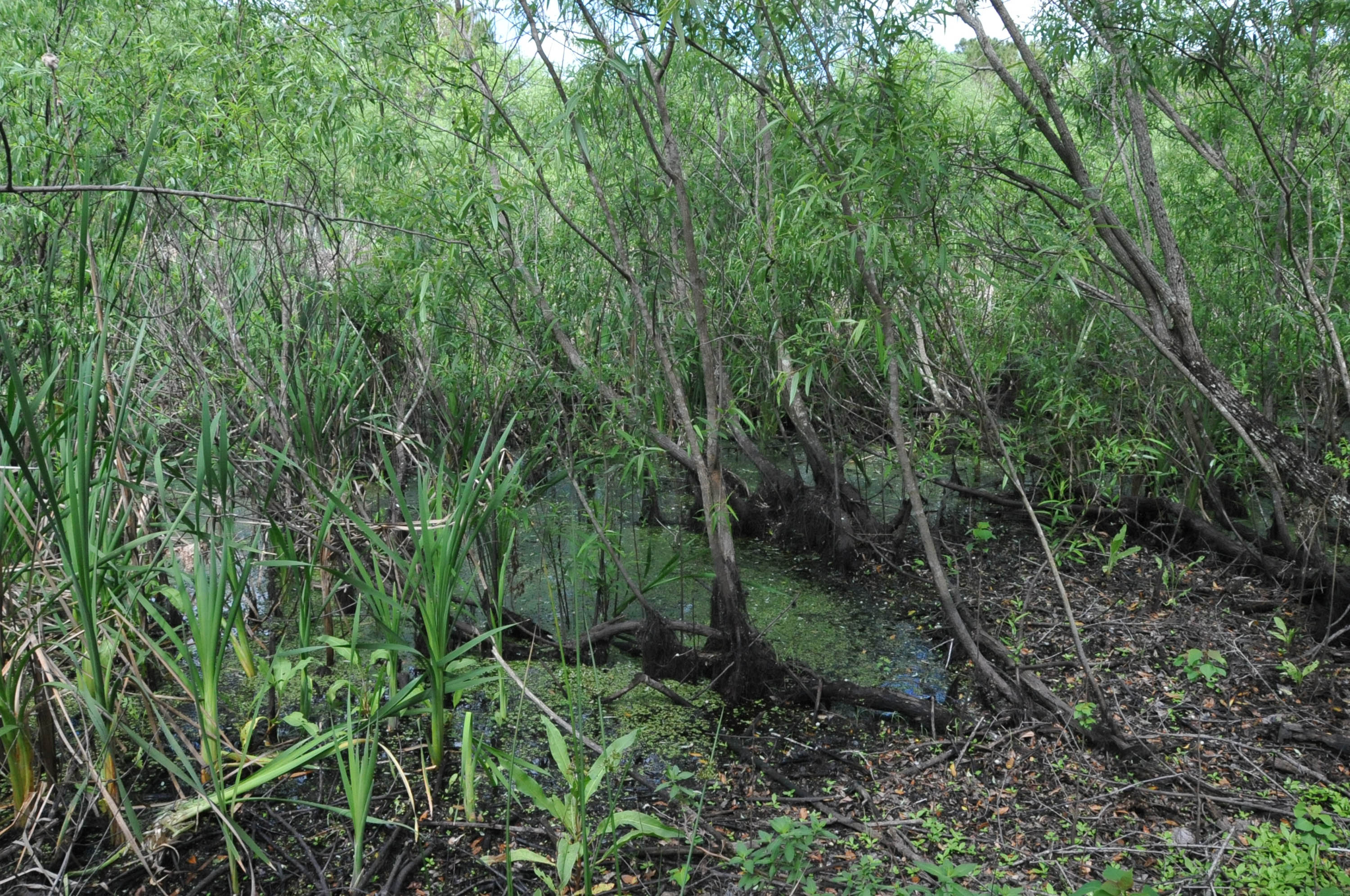

- Location within Florida Location within the United States
- Location: Brevard County, Florida
- Nearest city: Titusville
- Coordinates: 28°32′25″N 80°50′35″W
- Area: 1.3 acres (0.53 ha)
- NRHP reference No.: 87000810

Significant dates
- Added to NRHP: April 20, 1987
- Designated NHL: May 28, 1987

The Windover Archeological Site is a Middle Archaic (8000 to 1000 BC) archaeological site and National Historic Landmark in Brevard County near Titusville, Florida, United States, on the central east coast of the state. Windover is a muck pond where skeletal remains of at least 168 individuals were found buried in the peat at the bottom of the pond. The skeletons were well preserved because of the peat. In addition, remarkably well-preserved brain tissue has been recovered from 91 skulls from the site. DNA from the brain tissue has been sequenced. The collection of human skeletal remains and artifacts recovered from Windover Pond represent among the largest finds of each type from the Archaic Period. Windover is important to worldwide archaeology because of the preserved brain tissue found there as well as the extant textiles and grave goods.

== Site ==
The Windover site (archaeological site number 8BR46) is a small freshwater pond covering about 1/4 acre (0.10 ha) in Brevard County, Florida, about 5 miles (8 km) from Cape Canaveral and adjacent to the Atlantic Coastal Ridge. The pond has held water continuously for the last 10,000 years. During the Middle Archaic period, sea level was considerably lower than it is today, and the pond lay above the local water table. It was fed only by rainfall and runoff from the surrounding landscape and contained a thin layer of water over a shallow layer of peat.

As sea levels rose over thousands of years, the local water table also rose, and the pond gradually became fed by groundwater as well as rainfall. By 1984, when archaeologists began excavating the site, the pond contained five distinct layers of peat. In the center of the pond, the peat was covered by about 6 feet (1.8 m) of water. The top layer of peat, Zone 1, labeled Black Peat, consists of a dark brown to black herbaceous marsh peat over a dark brown to brown hardwood swamp peat. Zone 2, labeled Red/Brown Peat, where the burials were found, is a reddish-brown mixed hardwood swamp peat. Lower zones in the pond include the Rubber Peat, a layer of gyttja (decayed peat), and the Water Lily Peat, a peat derived from Nymphaea plants, with sub-zones consisting of Nymphaea and Cyperus and of Nymphaea and Sagittaria plants. The bottom zone is a layer of peaty sand on top of quartz sand. Windover Pond has a unusually neutral pH of 6.1 (other ponds in the vicinity have an average pH of 2.9), the water has high sulphur and other mineral content, and the peat is anaerobic, all of which is believed to have contributed to the preservation of the organic material found with the burials.

The period in which Windover Pond was being used for burials, from about 8000 Before Present (BP) until about 7000 BP, was the peak of the Hypsithermal, a warm and dry period. The area around the pond was a dry oak woodland. The climate was similar to today, with a continental pattern in the winter and a tropical pattern in the summer, although the continental pattern may have been stronger than the tropical pattern, with less rainfall in the summer.

== Discovery and excavation ==
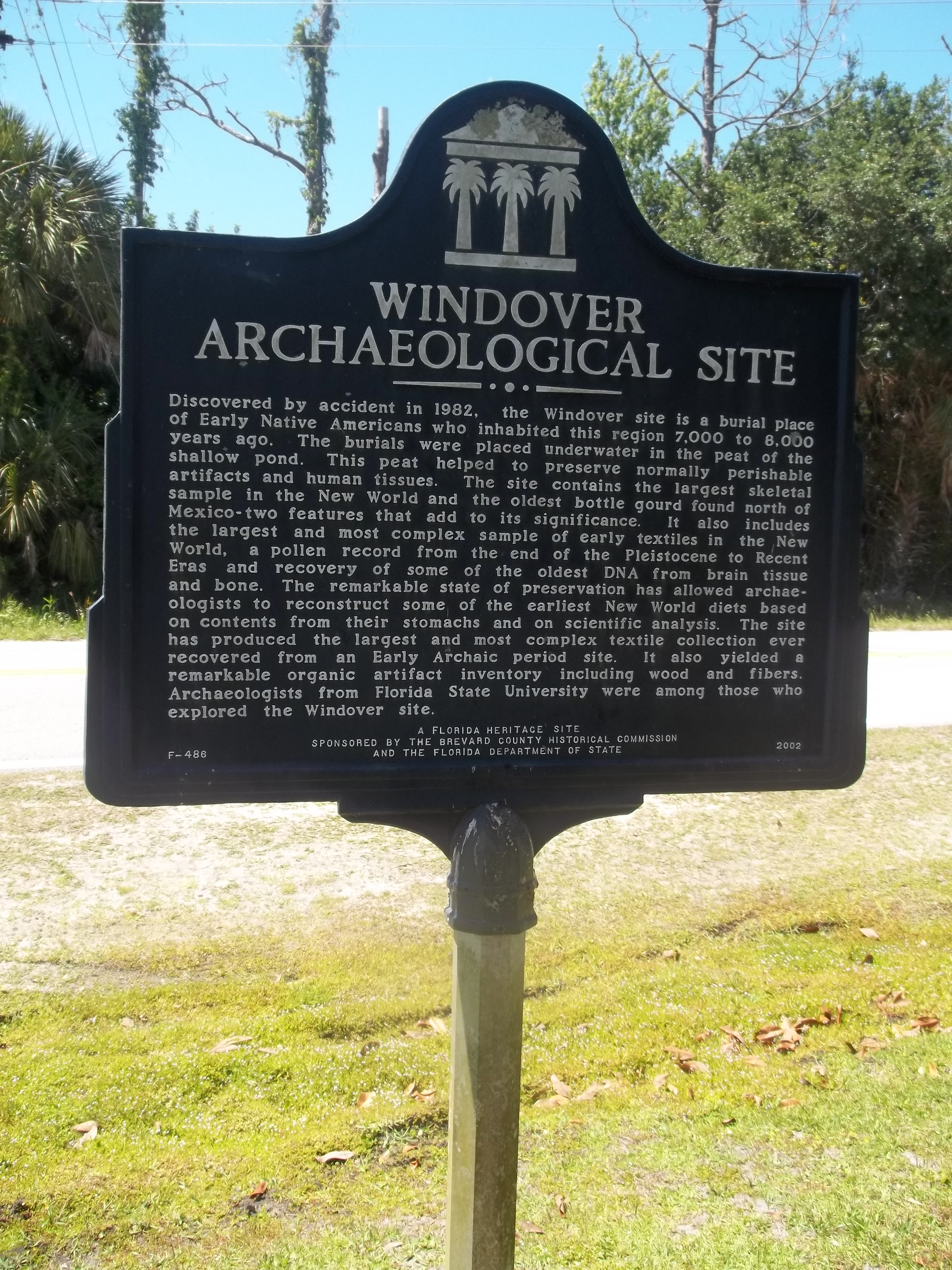
Archaeological site marker

In 1982, workers were clearing peat from a pond at Windover Farms, a housing development near Titusville, Florida. A road was planned to cross the pond. Backhoe operator Steve Vanderjagt noticed objects that looked like round rocks emerging from the peat. They were human skulls. Vanderjagt told his supervisor, and the discovery was reported to the sheriff. A medical examiner determined that the remains were prehistoric. Archaeologist Glen Doran later recalled Vanderjagt's explanation: "you don't find round rocks in a peat bog like this."

Developers Jack Eckerd and Jim Swann stopped work at the pond, and Swann contacted Florida State University. The developers had two bones recovered by the backhoe radiocarbon dated. The results were 7,210 and 7,320 radiocarbon years before present (BP), showing that the burials were thousands of years old. Eckerd and Swann changed their plans and routed the road away from the pond.

Two years after the discovery, Doran and archaeologist David Dickel of Florida State University began excavating the pond. They directed three field seasons, beginning in 1984, 1985 and 1986. Work started in mid-August each year and continued into December or January. The team excavated one area of the pond in the first season, two more in the second and another two in the third.

Before the team could reach the burials, it had to control the water. The bones lay at least 6 feet (1.8 m) below the surface of the peat at the bottom of the pond, beneath 3 to 10 feet (0.9 to 3.0 m) of water. Archaeologists used a network of about 160 well points around the pond to lower the water table. Workers then removed the wet peat with shovels and hand tools. One of the lead archaeologists compared digging it to digging chocolate mousse underwater.

About half the pond was excavated. The rest was left undisturbed for future investigation.

The construction work and archaeological excavations yielded remains representing at least 168 people. Researchers identified 58 individuals among the bones in peat displaced by the backhoe. Roughly 100 burials remained undisturbed, with the skeletons' bones still largely in their original anatomical positions. (Note: Hauswirth, Dickel and Lawlor gave a total of 177 individuals in a 1994 study.)

== Deposition ==
More than 7,000 years ago, Indigenous hunter-gatherers buried their dead in Windover Pond, near Titusville in east-central Florida. Archaeologists identified five or six distinct burial episodes spread over approximately 1,000 years during the Archaic period. Archaeologist Glen Doran reconstructed the burial process as people wading into the shallow water around the pond's edges, scraping aside the soft peat and placing a body in the hollow. He later suggested that the bodies were completely enclosed in peat, with about 10 to 15 cm (3.9 to 5.9 in) covering them.

Most bodies were laid on their left sides, with their arms and legs bent towards the torso and their heads pointing west. Only three people were found with their bodies extended. Some were wrapped in woven plant-fibre cloth, sometimes together with grave goods. Wooden stakes driven through the wrappings into the peat held the bodies in place beneath the water. The preservation of brain tissue suggests that burial took place promptly, within 24 to 48 hours of death.

The burials appear to have taken place mainly during summer and early autumn. Most fruits identified with the bodies ripen between July and October. Growth rings in pine stakes from six burials support this seasonal pattern. Five stakes had been cut in August or September, or later in the year, while the sixth may have been cut in late June or July.

Researchers suggested that the people who used Windover may have moved elsewhere during winter and spring, burying their dead at another location. Alternatively, changes in the pond's water level may have made underwater burial possible only during the wetter summer and early autumn months.

== Condition ==
The preservation state of the bones varied widely. Stojanowski, Seidemann and Doran scored 80 features on each skeleton as either present or deteriorated. The overall score for the skeletons examined was 53%, which the authors describe as "fairly well-preserved". There was no significant difference in the preservation scores between sexes, by age, or between skeletons in which brain matter was preserved and those in which it was not. There was a significant difference in preservation scores based on the weight of the bone, with the cranium and long limb bones (femur, radius, ulna, and tibia) being the best preserved, and the scapula and sternum least preserved. There was also a significant difference in the preservation of brain matter based on the condition of the cranium. Accordingly, the craniums of children, being smaller and thinner than those of adults, were less likely to contain preserved brain matter.

== Grave goods ==
=== Tools and artifacts ===
Numerous other artifacts, such as atlatls and projectile points, were also found at Windover. The occupants of Windover hunted animals, fished, and gathered plants.

There is a gender disparity in the distribution of some grave goods. Artifacts found only in the graves of adult males include perforators or punches made from antlers, atlatl components, a bone needle, gouges or burnishers made from the ulnas of deer, hollow-point awls, stone projectile points, gravers or burnishers made from mammal teeth, and shark-tooth drills. Artifacts found in the graves of adult females and children, but not adult males, include barbed antler projectile points, bird-bone tubes, gravers or scrapers made from shark teeth, shell necklaces, and containers made of turtle shell. Hamlin suggests that the antler projectile points were used to hunt small mammals, reptiles and fish, while stone projectile points and atlatls were used for hunting large mammals, that the hollow-point awls were used to make and mend nets, and that the bird-bone tubes and turtle-shell containers were used for dispensing medicine. Children and teenagers were buried with more grave goods than were adults, indicating the high value placed on children.

=== Shell objects ===
Shell beads and necklaces were found at Windover Pond, but other shell objects were scarce. Archaeologist Christine Hamlin found that shell necklaces accompanied adult women and children, but not adult men, in the burials she studied.

One shell had been shaped into a cup. Another had been worked to remove the animal's meat. The remaining shells showed no signs of alteration and came from disturbed soil, so archaeologists could not tell whether they had been placed with the dead. Archaeologist Glen Doran noted that the scarcity of shell artifacts at Windover was consistent with other Florida sites of the Archaic period. Shell objects became more common in later Florida traditions.

=== Textiles and other perishables ===
Thirty-seven of the graves contained woven fabrics which demonstrate relatively complex weaving technique and indicate that the bodies had been wrapped for burial. In the second (1986) and third (1987) excavation seasons at Windover 87 perishable fiber (textile and cordage) pieces from 67 individual items were recovered. The items were degraded and very fragile, and required extensive and elaborate processing and storage to render them suitable for examination. The items included pieces of cordage and textiles.

Textiles from the Windover site exhibit six different weaving patterns. Almost all of the textiles had closely spaced paired or trebled S twist (Note: In S twist the plies in a twine or cord appear to come up as they are twisted left. In Z twist the strands in the plies appear to come up as they are twisted to the right.) wefts and simple or diagonal twining. One specimen used open spaced paired S twist and Z twist wefts with simple twining, and one used simple plaiting (plain weave). Ten cords were twisted from two Z spun plies that are S twisted. One of the cords has S spun plies that were Z twisted. Two of the cords were braided using three strands.

Almost all of the fiber artifacts were made of palm leaves, probably from the cabbage palm, although saw palmetto leaves may have also been used. The warps in some of the textiles may have been from yucca plants. The one piece with an open weave was made from a kind of grass.

Fine plain woven fabrics (ten strands per cm) may have been used for inner garments, possibly resembling tunics, while more complex woven fabrics may have been used for ponchos, blankets and matting.

=== Bags and containers ===
A couple of the surviving fabric items appear to have been bags. The better preserved example was globular, measuring 63 by 47 cm (25 by 19 in), with an opening 10.3 by 12.6 cm (4.1 by 5.0 in) across. Its selvage, or finished edge, was made by folding the lengthwise strands back by 180° and working them into the fabric. This left a passage for a drawstring. The bag held the skeleton of a newborn and was buried with a child about 11 years old.

Less remained of a second bag. Near its former position, archaeologists found a group of bone needles and a possible tool for packing strands tightly during weaving. Textile researchers J. M. Adovasio and colleagues suggested that the tools may once have been kept in the bag, but could not establish whether they had been inside it.

Another burial contained a nearly complete bottle gourd (Lagenaria siceraria) beside a small wooden bowl made from live oak. The person buried with them was about 13 years old. The gourd lay near the left shoulder, partly over fabric and in direct contact with the bowl. It measured about 18 cm (7.1 in) long and 10 cm (3.9 in) wide. Its stem and seeds were missing, and no original contents were identified. Archaeologists Glen H. Doran and David N. Dickel and archaeobotanist Lee A. Newsom suggested that it may have been a container that was empty when buried or held a liquid. Two other bottle-gourd fragments, each less than 2 cm (0.79 in) square, were recovered elsewhere at Windover.

A piece of rind from the nearly complete gourd was directly radiocarbon dated to 7,290 ± 120 years before present. Doran, Dickel and Newsom described it in their 1990 study as the earliest documented bottle gourd north of Mexico.

== Water burials ==
Windover is one of several Archaic period sites in Florida with charnel or mortuary ponds, in which bodies have been found buried in shallow ponds with intact peat deposits. Similar burials occurred at Little Salt Spring (in Sarasota County) 5,200 to 6,800 years ago, where brain matter also survived in a number of skulls, Bay West (in Collier County) 5,940 to 6,840 years ago, and Republic Grove (in Hardee County) 5,690 to 6,470 years ago. A site currently 21 feet (6.4 m) below the surface of the Gulf of Mexico near Venice, Florida, the Manasota Key Offshore site, was discovered in 2016. It has multiple burials in multiple areas. The Manasota Key site was a freshwater peat pond when the burials occurred 7,200 years ago. This type of charnel or mortuary pond has been found only in southern and central Florida, and all are more than 5,000 years old.

At Windover, stakes were driven into the peat through fabrics wrapped around the bodies. Similar stakes were found associated with burials at Bay West, Republic Grove, and Manasota Key Offshore. The stakes may have been used to help hold the bodies underwater. There were also water burials (although not in peat ponds) in the sinkhole at Warm Mineral Springs, dating from as much as 12,000 years ago. Robin Brown notes in connection with these underwater burials that many Native American groups have a tradition that spirits of the dead are blocked by water. As recently as 1,500 to 2,000 years ago, bundled, defleshed bones were stored on a wooden platform set in the middle of a pond at Fort Center.

== Population ==
The remains found included bones of males and females varying in age from infancy to about 60 years, a total of 168 individuals. The average height of adult males was 5 feet 9 inches (175 cm). Children constituted about half the remains.

Of 169 burials uncovered at Windover, 65 were children, from newborn to an estimated 15 years old. The sex of the children could not be determined. Of the remaining 104, from age 16 to an individual over 70 years of age, 47 were female and 48 were male, while the sex of nine could not be determined.

Ten male and ten female skeletons were tested for carbon, nitrogen and oxygen isotopes to assess diet and long-term area of residence. No significant difference between males and females was found for diet or location of residence. One male and three female skeletons were outliers in terms of carbon isotopes, indicating a difference in diet. Such a difference might be due to cultural reasons, or to differences in customary diets between the widely spaced episodes of burials during the millennium Windover Pond was used for burials.

== Diet ==
While Windover Pond is relatively near the Atlantic Ocean (although it was farther away 7000 to 8000 years ago), the ratio of the nitrogen isotopes nitrogen-14 and nitrogen-15 in the collagen of human bones found in the pond indicate that deep-sea marine foods were absent from the diet of the Windover people. Tuross et al. note that the nitrogen-15 levels in the collagen in the Windover burials are the lowest of any population found in an archaeological site near a coast. The nitrogen isotope ratio of the collagen also indicates that terrestrial herbivores, such as white-tailed deer and rabbits, were not a major component of the diet. Analysis of the ratio of the carbon isotopes carbon-12 and carbon-13 in the collagen of the human bones found in the pond indicate a diet that included animals that browsed on grass, and particularly relied on riverine resources, such as ducks, turtles, and catfish.

Gut contents were found with many of the burials. The skeleton of a 70-some year old woman had a cluster of 3,324 seeds near the sacrum, mostly from elderberries, but including wild grapes and prickly pear fruit. Other edible plants, primarily in the form of seeds from fleshy fruits, were found. Three plants found associated with skeletons but not otherwise present in the environment were hackberry, black gum, and cabbage palm.

== Health ==
Seventy-five skeletons (32 females and 43 males) from Windover Pond were assessed for indicators of health and compared to the Western Hemisphere Health Index, a database of 12,520 skeletons from 218 archaeological sites in the Americas. Indigenous peoples of the Americas account for 80% of the individuals in the database, and 60% of the Indigenous individuals are from sites in North America. The index assesses skeletons for length of life and quality of life. Males from Windover Pond had more person-years (6,675) than females (4,716) but that may have been biased by the presence of a third more males than females in the dataset. Quality of life assessment is based on seven indicators: stature and robusticity, infection, dental health, enamel hypoplasias (underdevelopment of the teeth), trauma, degenerative joint disease, and porotic hyperostosis/cribra orbitalia (lesions in the cranium and orbital bone, likely caused by anemia or dietary deficiencies). The mean/median height was 164 centimetres (65 in) in males and 150 centimetres (59 in) in females. The taller height of males may have been the result of better access to food in childhood, resulting in less incidence of anemia and infectious disease.

=== Degenerative joint disease ===
Occurrence of degenerative joint disease by joint and gender
Joint(s)	Female	Male
Shoulder/Elbow	40%	27%
Hip/Knee	14%	27%
Cervical vertebrae	28%	39%
Thoracic vertebrae	31%	30%
Lumbar vertebrae	28%	44%

Many of the skeletons found in Windover Pond showed evidence of degenerative joint disease, a type of osteoarthritis. An evaluation of 75 of the skeletons (32 females and 43 males) from Windover Pond showed a lower incidence rate of degenerative joint disease than did the more than 12,000 skeletons recorded in the Western Hemisphere Health Index. Patterns of occurrence of degenerative joint disease in the Windover Pond skeletons differed between males and females, as indicated in the adjoining table. Two older females, but no males, had degenerative joint disease of the wrist. One of those females also had degenerative joint disease of the hand.

Rachel Wentz attributes the higher incidence of degenerative joint disease of the shoulder and elbow in females to stress arising from preparing food and processing palm fiber for use in textiles, and the higher incidence of degenerative joint disease of the lumbar vertebrae in males to the stress of processing hides or from carrying heavy loads, such as carrying large animals killed in hunts or when moving between seasonal habitation sites. Wentz et al. call the low rate of degenerative joint disease in the wrists and hands "curious" compared to the rate of degenerative joint disease in shoulders and elbows, and attribute the higher rate of degenerative joint disease of the hips and knees in male skeletons to increased walking engaged in hunting.

=== Teeth ===
The teeth of people buried at Windover showed substantial wear even early in life. This has been attributed to sand in their food. Men and women had similar rates of enamel hypoplasia, a condition in which the hard outer coating of a tooth does not develop fully. A 2006 study interpreted this similarity as evidence that boys and girls experienced comparable nutritional and health stresses while their teeth were forming.

Cavities affected 6.9 percent of women's teeth and 4.5 percent of men's teeth. Men, however, had more evidence of dental abscesses, infections around the roots of teeth. These affected 4.3 percent of tooth sockets in men and 3.2 percent in women. Men had also lost a greater proportion of their teeth before death: 10.5 percent, compared with 7.9 percent in women.

Three people had a rare tooth feature called a talon cusp, an extra projection on the inner surface of a front tooth, facing the tongue. In each person, it affected a permanent upper lateral incisor, one of the teeth immediately beside the two central front teeth. A 2011 study examined these alongside similar examples from Buckeye Knoll, another Archaic-period cemetery in Texas. At the time of publication, the researchers described the finds from these two sites as the oldest reported examples in the Americas.

The Windover people's tooth shapes have also provided evidence for comparisons with other populations. A 2015 study found that their dental features differed from those of the Asian groups examined. However, heavy wear obscured some features, researchers differed in how they recorded them, and missing observations could distort how common particular traits appeared to be.

=== Trauma ===
Skeletons from Windover Pond show a significantly lower incidence of traumatic injury than the average in the Western Hemisphere Health Index. Male skeletons from Windover Pond were slightly more likely to show traumatic injury than were female skeletons. The majority of the injuries appear to have been accidental. The most common injury observed in Windover Pond skeletons was a fracture of the ulna. Females were slightly more likely to suffer arm injuries than males, but had no fractures of the face or skull. Females were more likely to suffer significant trauma to their hands, which might be a result of work processing food or hides.

One male had a fracture to the right eye orbit and a broken ulna, both of which had healed before he died. Another male had a sharpened antler point embedded in the pelvis. Five other male skulls had depression fractures, and several skeletons (males, females, and children) had broken ulnas, which might be parry wounds from fending off an attack. Those injuries have been ascribed to interpersonal conflict. Wentz et al., however, state that of the Windover Pond skeletons that they assessed, none "exhibited fracture patterns indicative of interpersonal conflict, such as multiple injuries in combination with fractures of the face or head", and that "none of the individuals displayed patterned injuries suggesting intentional injury".

=== Spina bifida ===
Evidence of spina bifida was found in five out of 24 sacra examined. The vertebral defects were below the sacrum (in the coccyx) in four of the specimens, and were likely to have not produced any symptons. The fifth sacrum, from a 14 to 16 year-old male, had an aperture (opening) in the vertebrae exposing the spinal cord from the third lumbar vertebrae to the second sacral vertebrae (spina bifida aperta). Asymmetrical development of the neutral arches of the lumbar vertebrae produced a scoliotic bend.

The right tibia and fibula of the sub-adult male had suffered from infections, and the right tibia was infected at the time of death (The left leg bones were missing, so it is not known if they had been infected). About one-quarter of the lower end of the tibia had been lost and the bone had at least partially healed and been remodeled, a process that may have taken up to two years. The appearance of the bones suggests that the bone infections were due to infections and necrosis in the soft tissues of the leg.

As his spinal condition almost certainly meant the boy was paralyzed below the waist, this find was important for assessing the society's commitment to ensuring his survival for 15 years in a hunter-gatherer community.

=== Other factors ===
Female skeletons showed higher rates of cribra orbitalia (porosity of the orbital roof), porotic hyperostosis (porosity of the cranial vault), and infection of the tibia. Occurrence of infections elsewhere on the skeleton was about the same for both sexes. The higher rates of the named conditions are attributed to females enduring more periods of biological stress than males.

== Preserved brain tissue ==
In late 1984, archaeologists discovered that brain tissue had survived in many of the skulls. Lumps of greasy, brownish material were found in several skulls when they were opened for examination. Suspecting that this was brain tissue, the researchers sent the intact skulls for X-ray, CAT scans, and magnetic resonance imaging (MRI), which showed recognizable brain structures. In addition, cell structures were seen under a microscope. At least 90 of the recovered bodies had brain tissue that survived, due to the preservative effects of the peat. The state of preservation of the brain tissues allowed a determination that the bodies were buried in the peat within 24 to 48 hours after death. This preservation allowed researchers to sequence DNA from the brains.

=== Preservation factors ===
Traces of human DNA were found on fragments of skulls (only about half of the skulls recovered from the pond were intact). All of the intact skulls contained preserved brain tissue. Several conditions of the burials in Windover pond contributed to the preservation of the brain tissue and DNA. The brain tissue preserved in intact skulls at Windover Pond had produced adipocere (grave wax), which is formed when fatty tissue in a body is subject to hydrolysis in the absence of oxygen. The production of adipocere requires fatty tissue, water, electrolytes (which may come from body fluids), and for putrifaction to have started.

The water in the pond is very hard (with total dissolved solids of 1,447 mg/l compared to 170.3 mg/l in a neighboring pond, and a total hardness of 716 mg/l compared to 29 mg/l in the neighboring pond). The peat becomes anaerobic just a few cm below top. The pH of the water in the pond is near neutral (6.1–6.9). Peat bogs are typically acidic, and non-neutral pH tends to degrade DNA. The presence of a layer of snail shells in the pond below the layer in which burials occurred or the presence of nearby limestone formations may be the source of a level of carbonates in the water that are sufficient to buffer the pH. The combination of conditions in Windover Pond inhibited the growth of bacteria and the depurination, deamination, and oxidation of DNA.

=== Genetic analysis ===
DNA preserved in the brain tissue provided information about some of the people buried at Windover. The remains were approximately 7,000 to 8,000 years old. A study published in 1991 examined nuclear DNA from one individual. Researchers identified parts of six genes, including five belonging to the human leukocyte antigen gene family, which plays a role in the immune system. The recovered sequences allowed a tentative identification of that individual's HLA-A and HLA-B type.

By 1994, nuclear and mitochondrial DNA had been examined from multiple individuals whose burials spanned nearly the entire period during which the pond was used as a cemetery. Mitochondrial DNA is inherited through the maternal line. Both nuclear and mitochondrial genetic types persisted throughout the burial sequence, leading the researchers to conclude that the people buried at Windover could be treated as a single population.

Some mitochondrial types found at Windover were clearly related to types found among living Indigenous peoples of the Americas. Others were more distantly related and may have reflected different genetic origins, although the researchers stated that more complete sequencing was needed before the issue could be resolved. The studies were conducted during the early development of ancient DNA analysis and examined selected genes and short sections of DNA rather than complete genomes. The recovery of genetic material from the preserved tissue showed that human DNA could survive for thousands of years in a waterlogged archaeological site.

Smith et al. were able to extract measurable quantities of human mitochondrial DNA from 19 of the skeletons excavated at Windover. The samples were tested to determine which haplogroups they belonged to. Haplogroups A, B, C, D, and X are regarded as the founding haplogroups of the indigenous people of North America. Haplogroups A and C were not found in the Windover skeletons, and haplogroups B and D were rare, if present. While only some of the skeletons were tested for the presence of haplogroup X, Smith et al. state that it is possible that most, if not all, of the Windover skeletons tested belong to haplogroup X. While some indigenous peoples of North America have high rates of haplogroup X, the people who were present in the Southeastern United States in the historical period (speakers of Mukogean and Iroquoian languages) had high rates of A and C haplogroups and no X haplogroup. Smith et al. conclude that the Windover people "may represent the demonstrated instance of the recent extinction of a group of Native Americans with no close surviving relatives.".

== Significance ==
Windover Pond is one of a number of sites in Florida excavated since 1970 that have led to a major reassessment of the Archaic period in Florida. Jerald T. Milanich states that Windover has provided "unprecedented and dramatic" information about the early Archaic people in Florida, and that the Windover site may be "one of the most significant archaeological sites ever excavated." Barbara Purdy has described Windover as unique and of "national and international significance", and "the only site in the Americas that supplied detailed information about certain cultural practices, artifacts, and human populations dating to the Early Archaic." Hauswirth, Dickel, and Lawlor stated that, as of 1994, Windover was "the most extensively characterized wet site with regard to ancient human DNA". The site was designated a National Historic Landmark in 1987 in recognition of this significance.

== Bibliography ==
- Adovasio, J. M.; Andrews, R. L.; Hyland, D. C.; Illingworth, J. S. (2001). "Perishable Industries from the Windover Bog: An Unexpected Window into the Florida Archaic". North American Archaeologist. 22 (1): 1–90. doi:10.2190/BX11-VDQY-LG5N-P94F.
- Andrews, R. L.; Adovasio, J. M.; Humphrey, B.; Hyland, D. C.; Gardner, J. S.; Harding, D. G. (2002). "Conservation and analysis of textile and related perishable artifacts". In Doran, Glen H. (ed.). Windover: Multidisciplinary investigations of an early Archaic Florida cemetery. Gainesville, Florida: University Press of Florida. pp. 121–165. ISBN 978-0-8130-2510-0.
- Brotemarkle, Ben (2017). "35 years of discovery: The past, present, and future of Windover". The Journal of the Brevard County Historical Commission. XVI (2): 4, 5.
- Brown, Robin C. (1994). Florida's First People: 12,000 Years of Human History. Sarasota, Florida: Pineapple Press. ISBN 1-56164-032-8.
- Cassanello, Robert; Ford, Chip (January 2012). ""Episode 01 Windover Burial Site"". A History of Central Florida Podcast.
- Dickel, D. N.; Doran, G. H. (1989). "Severe neural tube defect syndrome from the early archaic of Florida". American Journal of Physical Anthropology. 80 (3): 325–334. doi:10.1002/ajpa.1330800306. ISSN 1096-8644.
- Doran, Glen H. (2002a). "Acknowledgments and dedication". In Doran, Glen H. (ed.). Windover: Multidisciplinary investigations of an early Archaic Florida cemetery. Gainesville, Florida: University Press of Florida. pp. xvii–xix. ISBN 978-0-8130-2510-0.
- Doran, Glen H. (2002b). "Introduction to wet sites and Windover (8BR246) investigations". In Doran, Glen H. (ed.). Windover: Multidisciplinary investigations of an early Archaic Florida cemetery. Gainesville, Florida: University Press of Florida. pp. 1–38. ISBN 978-0-8130-2510-0.
- Doran, Glen H.; Dickel, David N. (1988). "Multidisciplinary investigations at the Windover site". In Purdy, Barbara (ed.). Wet Site Archaeology. Caldwell, New Jersey: The Telford Press. pp. 263–289. ISBN 0-936923-07-5.
- Doran, Glen H.; Dickel, David N.; Ballinger, William E. Jr.; Agee, O. Frank; Laipis, Philip J.; Hauswirth, William W. (1986). "Anatomical, cellular and molecular analysis of 8,000-yr-old human brain tissue from the Windover archaeological site". Nature. 323: 803–806. doi:10.1038/323803a0. PMID 2430186.
- Doran, Glen H.; Dickel, David N.; Newsom, Lee A. (April 1990). "A 7,290-Year-Old Bottle Gourd from the Windover Site, Florida". American Antiquity. 55 (2): 354–360. doi:10.2307/281653.
- Drake, Lesleyanne (January 13, 2021). "Windover: Prehistoric Past Revealed at Ancient Pond Cemetery". Orange County Regional History Center.
- Hamlin, Christine (2001). "Sharing the Load: Gender and Task Division at the Windover Site". In Arnold, Bettina; Wicker, Nancy L. (eds.). Gender and the Archaeology of Death. Bloomsbury Publishing PLC. pp. 119–135. ISBN 978-0-7591-1703-7.
- Hauswirth, William W.; Dickel, Cynthia D.; Lawlor, David A. (1994). "DNA Analysis of the Windover Population". In Herrmann, Bernd; Hummel, Susanne (eds.). Ancient DNA: Recovery and Analysis of Genetic Material from Paleontological, Archaeological, Museum, Medical, and Forensic Specimens. Springer. pp. 104–121. doi:10.1007/978-1-4612-4318-2. ISBN 978-1-4612-4318-2.
- Hauswirth, William W.; Dickel, Cynthia D.; Rowold, David J.; Hauswirth, Marilyn A. (1994). "Inter- and intrapopulation studies of ancient humans". Experientia. 50 (6): 585–591. doi:10.1007/BF01921729. PMID 8020619.
- Lawlor, David A.; Dickel, Cynthia D.; Hauswirth, William W.; Parham, Peter (1991). "Ancient HLA genes from 7,500-year-old archaeological remains". Nature. 349: 785–788. doi:10.1038/349785a0. PMID 2000149.*McGoun, William E. (1993). Prehistoric Peoples of South Florida. Tuscaloosa, Alabama: The University of Alabama Press. ISBN 0-8173-0686-2.
- Milanich, Jerald T. (1994). Archaeology of Precolumbian Florida. Gainesville, Florida: University Press of Florida. ISBN 0-8130-1273-2.
- Milanich, Jerald T. (1998). Florida's Indians from Ancient Times to the Present. Gainesville, Florida: University Press of Florida. ISBN 0-8130-1599-5.
- Purdy, Barbara A. (1991). The art and archaeology of Florida's wetlands. Boca Raton, Florida: CRC Press. ISBN 0-8493-8808-2.
- Purdy, Barbara A. (1996). How to do archaeology the right way. Gainesville, Florida: University of Florida. ISBN 978-0-8130-1392-3.
- Purdy, Barbara A. (2008). Florida's People During the Last Ice Age. Gainesville, Florida: University Press of Florida. p. 88. ISBN 978-0-8130-3204-7.
- Richardson, Joseph L. "The Windover Archaeological Research Project". North Brevard Business Directory.
- Smith, David Glenn; Rolfs, Becky K.; Kaestle, Frederika; Malhi, Ripan S.; Doran, Glen H. (2002). "Serum albumin phenotypes and a preliminary study of the Windover mtDNA haplogroups and their anthropological significance". In Doran, Glen H. (ed.). Windover: Multidisciplinary investigations of an early Archaic Florida cemetery. Gainesville, Florida: University Press of Florida. pp. 241–249. ISBN 978-0-8130-2510-0.
- Stojanowski, Christopher M.; Johnson, Kent M. (2015). "Observer error, dental wear, and the inference of new world sundadonty". American Journal of Physical Anthropology. 156 (3): 349–362. doi:10.1002/ajpa.22653. PMID 25363296.
- Stojanowski, Christopher M.; Johnson, Kent M.; Doran, Glen H.; Ricklis, Robert A. (2011). "Talon cusp from two archaic period cemeteries in North America: Implications for comparative evolutionary morphology". American Journal of Physical Anthropology. 144 (3): 411–420. doi:10.1002/ajpa.21422. PMID 21302267.
- Stojanowski, Christopher M.; Seidemann, Ryan M.; Doran, Glen H. (2002). "Differential skeletal preservation at Windover Pond: Causes and consequences". American Journal of Physical Anthropology (in French). 119 (1): 15–26. doi:10.1002/ajpa.10101. ISSN 1096-8644.
- Tuross, Noreen; Fogel, Marilyn L.; Newsom, Lee; Doran, Glen H. (April 1994). "Subsistence in the Florida Archaic: The Stable-Isotope and Archaeobotanical Evidence from the Windover Site". American Antiquity. 59 (2): 288–303. doi:10.2307/281933. ISSN 0002-7316.
- Wentz, Rachel K. (March 2010). "Patterns of degenerative joint disease among males and females at Windover (8Br246) and their relationship to grave goods" (PDF). The Florida Anthropologist. 63 (1): 5–10.
- Wentz, Rachel K.; Tucker, Bryan; Krigbaum, John; Doran, Glen H. (2006). "Gauging differential health among the sexes at Windover (8Br246) using the Western Hemisphere Health Index". Memórias do Instituto Oswaldo Cruz. 101: 77–83. doi:10.1590/S0074-02762006001000014. hdl:1807/57062. ISSN 0074-0276.
