= Old Miakka Preserve =

Preserve area in Sarasota County, Florida

- IUCN category V (protected landscape/seascape)
- Location within Florida
- Location: Sarasota, Florida
- Coordinates: 27°20′03″N 82°15′44″W
- Area: 129.45 acres (52.39 ha)
- Established: August 31, 2006
- Owner: Sarasota County

Old Miakka Preserve is a 129.45-acre (52.39 ha) preserve located north of Old Miakka in Sarasota County, Florida. The preserve contains 4 miles (6.4 km) of hiking trails.

== History ==
The land was acquired through Sarasota County's Environmentally Sensitive Lands Protection Program (ESLPP) in August 2006.
