= Circus Hammock =

Nature preserve in Sarasota County, Florida

- Circus Hammock Preserve
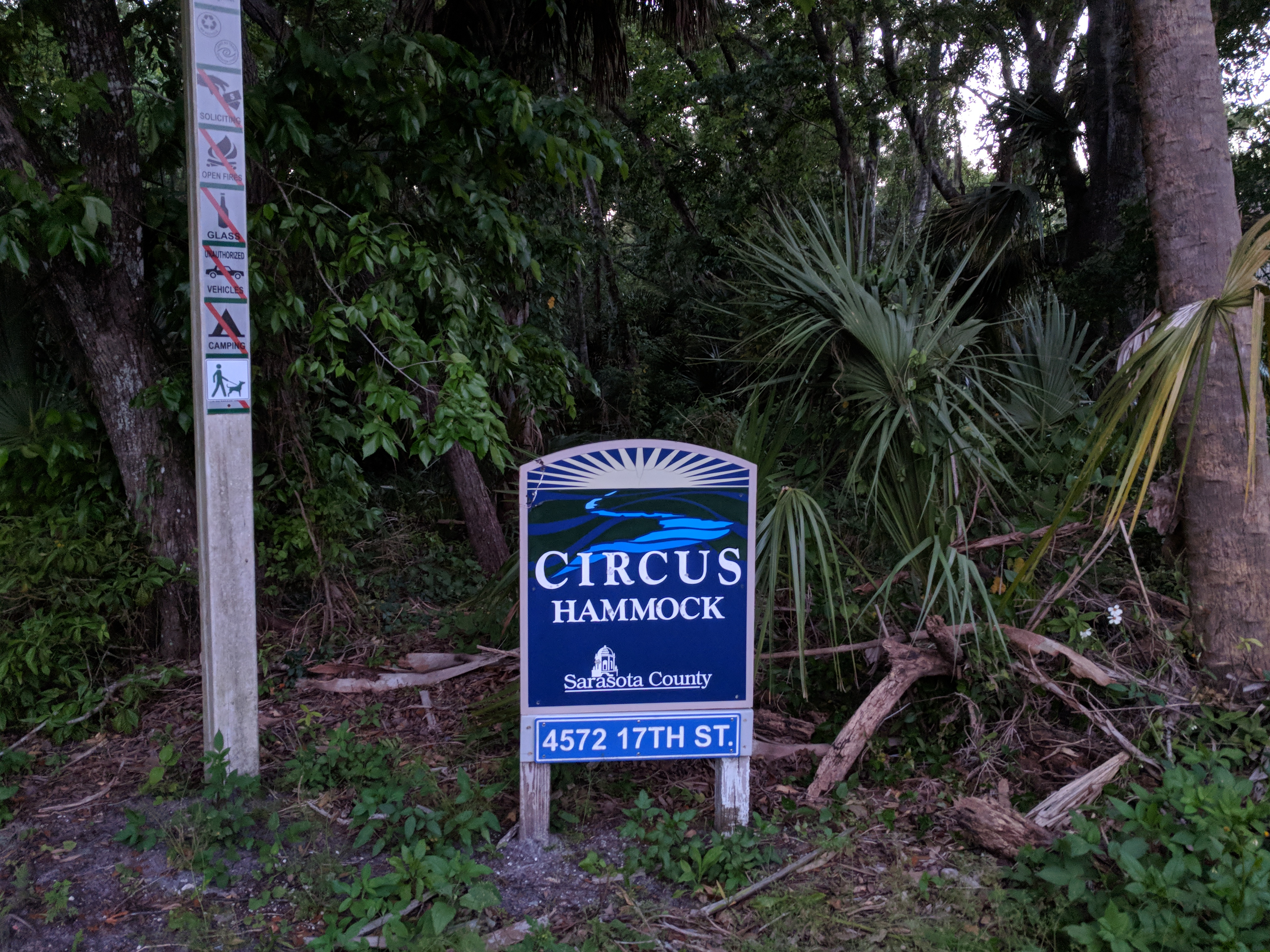
- Entrance of Circus Hammock

- Location within Florida
- Location: Sarasota, Florida
- Coordinates: 27.3504°N 82.4809°W
- Area: 22.14 acres (8.96 ha)
- Established: June 5, 2006
- Owner: Sarasota County

Circus Hammock is a 22.14-acre (8.96 ha) preserve with unpaved walking trails in Sarasota, Florida. The name is a reference to the historic winter quarters of the Ringling Brothers Circus. Habitat at the preserve includes hydric hammock.

The property was purchased by Sarasota County in June 2006 through the Environmentally Sensitive Lands Protection Program (ESLPP). Wildlife inhabiting the area include woodpeckers, box turtles, red-shouldered hawks, barred owls and song birds. The entrance is adjacent to 17th Street Paw Park and north of 17th Street Park.
