= Miakka School House =

- U.S. National Register of Historic Places
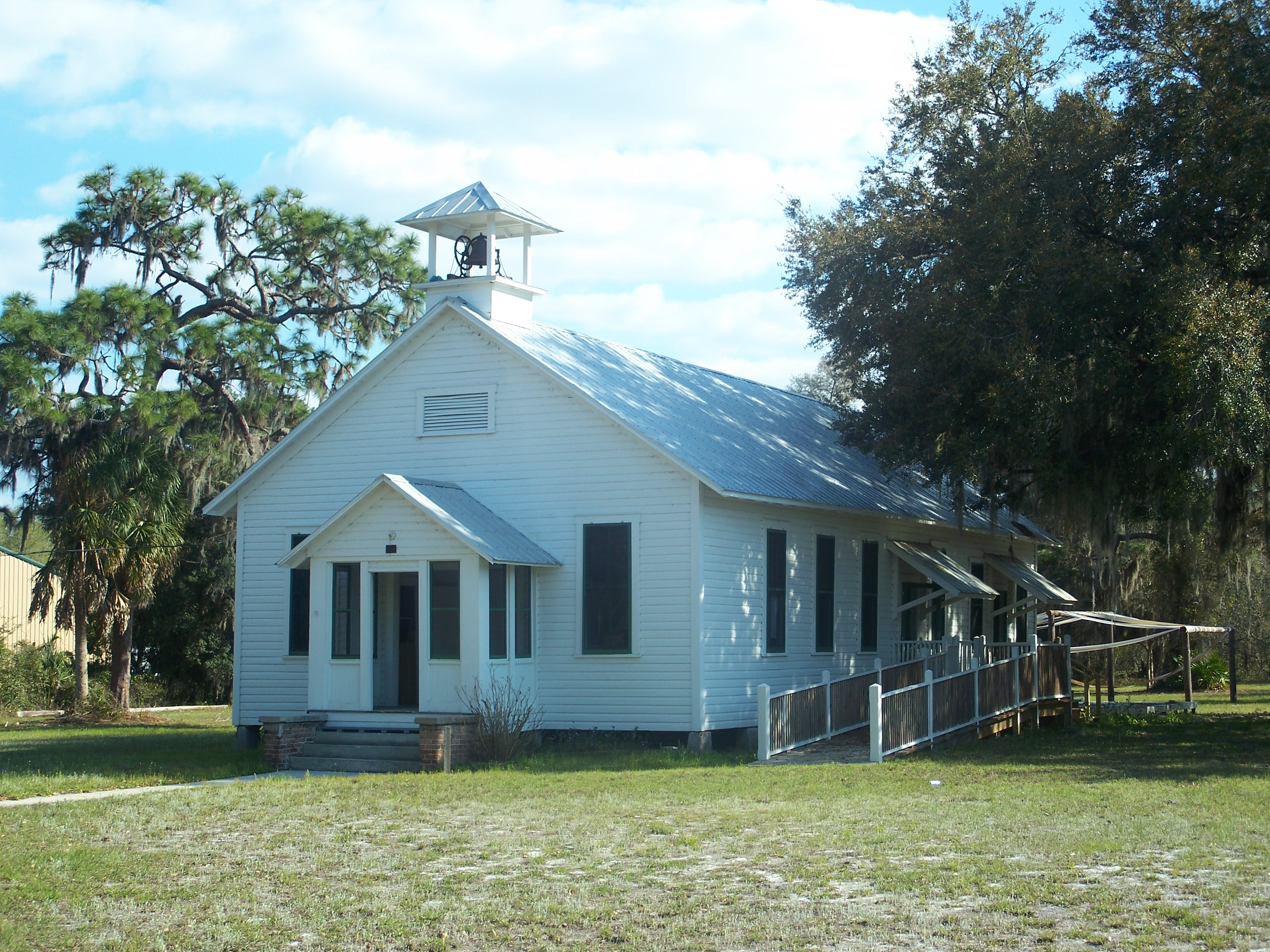

- Location within Florida
- Location: Old Miakka, Florida
- Coordinates: 27°19′10″N 82°16′11″W
- Built: 1914
- Architectural style: Frame Vernacular
- NRHP reference No.: 86001458
- Added to NRHP: July 3, 1986

The Miakka School House is a historic school located in Old Miakka, Florida. It is located at the junction of Miakka and Wilson Roads. On July 3, 1986, it was added to the U.S. National Register of Historic Places.

The building was constructed in July 1914 and completed in September 1914.
