= Sleeping Turtles Preserve =

Nature preserve in Sarasota County, Florida

- IUCN category V (protected landscape/seascape)
- Location: Sarasota County, Florida
- Area: 382 acres (155 ha)
- Established: 2003–2004
- Governing body: Sarasota County

Location of Sleeping Turtles Preserve
1 North
2 South

Sleeping Turtles Preserve (known locally as two separate entities as Sleeping Turtles Preserve North and Sleeping Turtles Preserve South) includes 382 acres (155 hectares) of land in Sarasota County, Florida, that were purchased in four parcels during 2003 and 2004 through the county's Environmentally Sensitive Lands Protection Program (ESLPP). The preserve is separated by Interstate 75, which runs east-west. Access to the northern preserve is located at 3462 Border Road in Venice, and the southern preserve is located at 2800 River Road.

== History ==
The name "Sleeping Turtles" comes from descriptions on naval maps from the 1800s of the Myakka River. The park includes floodplain swamps, pine flatwoods, upland mixed forests and seasonal wetlands; habitats for gopher tortoises, swallow-tailed kites, alligators and songbirds. The preserve can be toured on five miles (eight kilometers) of unpaved hiking trails. The southern preserve has a canoe and kayak launch on the Myakka River.

The northern portion of the preserve contains 174 acres (70 ha). The southern portion of the preserve contains 208 acres (84 ha) with connectivity to Snook Haven.
