= Curry Creek Preserve =

Nature preserve in Florida, United States

- IUCN category V (protected landscape/seascape)
- Location within Florida
- Location: Venice, Florida
- Coordinates: 27.11602°N 82.43328°W
- Area: 80.63 acres (0.3263 km^{2})
- Established: August 15, 2001
- Owner: Sarasota County

Curry Creek Preserve is an 80-acre preserve with trails and a paddle boat launch in Venice, Florida. It is located at 1075 Albee Farm Road. Named after a family of early pioneer settlers to the area, the preserve was purchased in 2002 through the Environmentally Sensitive Lands Protection Program (ESLPP). Habitats include mangrove forests, tidal marshes, and flatwoods, with the rare Pond apple tree found upstream along the creek. Wildlife inhabitants include tortoises, alligators, river otters, eastern indigo snakes and wading birds "such as the roseate spoonbill and wood stork".

Sarasota County Public Works maintains a 19-acre tidal marsh and tidal swamp restoration site nearby.
