= Hi Hat Ranch, Florida =

Hi Hat Ranch
- Planned community
- Location within the state of Florida
- Coordinates: 27°17′22″N 82°21′26″W
- Country: United States
- State: Florida
- Counties: Sarasota

Area
  - Total: 15 sq mi (40 km^{2})
- Elevation: 39 ft (12 m)
- Time zone: UTC−05:00 (Eastern (EST))
  - Summer (DST): UTC−04:00 (EDT)
- Area code: 941
- GNIS feature ID: 300872

Hi Hat Ranch is a planned community located in eastern Sarasota County Florida consisting of approximately 10,000 acres (4,000 ha).

== History ==
The initial development of Hi Hat Ranch happened when Ross Beason, a New York businessman, acquired the land in 1937. Beason put the land up for sale after World War II. Hi Hat Ranch was then bought by Herman Turner in a series of transactions from 1943 to 1945. Turner assumed full control of the ranch on April 1, 1945, consisting 26,200 acres (10,600 ha) of land, which is about one-eighth of Sarasota County by total area.

The community development project is in the planning stages. In 2021, a comprehensive plan amendment for the development of Hi Hat Ranch was approved. An application for the development of the first village, has been in the processing stage since 2023.
