= Old Miakka, Florida =

- Census-designated place
- Old Myakka
- Location within the state of Florida
- Coordinates: 27°19′11″N 82°16′40″W
- Country: United States
- State: Florida
- County: Sarasota
- Elevation: 49 ft (15 m)

Population (2020)
  - Total: 1,743
- Time zone: UTC−05:00 (EST)
  - Summer (DST): UTC−04:00 (EDT)
- ZIP code: 34240
- Area code: 941
- FIPS code: 12-51345
- GNIS feature ID: 2805199

Old Miakka (or Old Myakka) is a census-designated place in Sarasota County, Florida, United States. It is located at the bend of County Road 780, where it changes from running north–south to east–west. The population was 1,743 at the 2020 census. The community is part of the North Port–Bradenton–Sarasota, Florida Metropolitan Statistical Area.

== History ==
The area was named after the Myakka River which a local group of people of either Seminole (Muscogee speaking) or Miccosukee (Hitchiti speaking) descent called the "Miarca River." The name Miakka first appeared on maps in 1845.

The U.S. Post Office for Miakka was first registered in 1879 by Augustus M. Wilson.

The Old Miakka United Methodist Church was built in 1886 on land donated by William Rawls and Augustus M. Wilson. There is a historical marker located at the church erected by the Sarasota County Historical Commission in 1982.

The Old Miakka School was constructed in 1914. There is a historical marker located at the schoolhouse erected by the Sarasota County Historical Commission in 1987.

The Miakka community was originally part of Hillsborough County (1834), then subsequently Manatee County (1855) and finally Sarasota County (1921).

== Place-name spelling ==
A letter written in 1940 by W. Stanley Hanson of the Seminole Indian Association to Claude E. Ragan, Project Superintendent of the newly formed Myakka River State Park which was known as Miakka Valley State Forest & Park. The letter explains Hanson's attempt to discover the history and origin of the various spellings.

The United States Board on Geographic Names (BGN) ruled in December 1943 on the usage of "Old Miakka" for the spelling of the geographical name as it was "both officially and locally preferred to help distinguish it from Myakka City and vice versa." The ruling acknowledged the spelling Miakka found on various official documents such as the USGS state maps, Rand McNally Atlas, and Official State Road Map.

== Demographics ==
Old Miakka first appeared as a census designated place in the 2020 U.S. census.

=== 2020 census ===
As of the 2020 census, Old Miakka had a population of 1,743. The median age was 49.9 years. 19.2% of residents were under the age of 18 and 20.7% of residents were 65 years of age or older. For every 100 females there were 103.1 males, and for every 100 females age 18 and over there were 98.0 males age 18 and over.

0.0% of residents lived in urban areas, while 100.0% lived in rural areas.

There were 642 households in Old Miakka, of which 25.1% had children under the age of 18 living in them. Of all households, 73.7% were married-couple households, 10.9% were households with a male householder and no spouse or partner present, and 11.4% were households with a female householder and no spouse or partner present. About 15.3% of all households were made up of individuals and 7.4% had someone living alone who was 65 years of age or older.

There were 698 housing units, of which 8.0% were vacant. The homeowner vacancy rate was 2.1% and the rental vacancy rate was 5.6%.

Racial composition as of the 2020 census
Race	Number	Percent
White	1,570	90.1%
Black or African American	19	1.1%
American Indian and Alaska Native	6	0.3%
Asian	14	0.8%
Native Hawaiian and Other Pacific Islander	0	0.0%
Some other race	24	1.4%
Two or more races	110	6.3%
Hispanic or Latino (of any race)	103	5.9%

== Recreation ==
Old Miakka Preserve is nearby and has trails.
