= Manasota Scrub Preserve =

Preserve in Sarasota County, Florida USA

- IUCN category V (protected landscape/seascape)
- Location within Florida
- Location: Englewood, Florida
- Coordinates: 27.018°N 82.394°W
- Area: 154 acres (0.62 km^{2})
- Established: September 19, 2000
- Owner: Sarasota County

The Manasota Scrub Preserve is an area of protected land in Sarasota County, Florida. It is located at 2695 Bridge Street in Englewood, Florida, in a suburban area that is part of the Lemon Bay watershed.

The 154-acre preserve was acquired during 2000 and 2002 with funds from the state's Environmentally Sensitive Lands Protection Program and the Florida Communities Trust. It is named after the Manasota Land and Timber Company and the type of vegetation present, scrubland. It includes trails, a boardwalk, and a picnic area. The preserve's upland and wetland habitats are home to gopher tortoises, northern quail, swallowtail butterflies and great horned owls. Plant species include wildflowers: grassleaf, goldenaster and blazing-star.
