= Manasota Key Offshore =

Underwater archaeological site

The Manasota Key Offshore (8SO7030) is an archaeological site under 21 feet (6.4 m) of water in the Gulf of Mexico near the southwest coast of Florida. The site contains remains of multiple humans who were buried in a freshwater pond 7,200 years ago. The pond, which was about 9 feet (2.7 m) above sea level at the time, was subsequently covered by the waters of the Gulf as sea levels rose. The site is about 0.25 miles (0.40 km) from the coast of Manasota Key, near Venice, Florida.

The site was found in 2016 by a fossil hunter, who reported possible human remains. Archaeologists examined the site using non-intrusive methods, including magnetometry, sub-bottom profiling and side-scan sonar. The examination of the site revealed multiple burials in clusters. The burials were in what had been a layer of peat at the bottom of a freshwater pond. Wooden stakes were found associated with the burials. The peat had helped preserve the bones and the wooden stakes. Two of the stakes found at the site yielded radiocarbon dates of 7,200 years ago, early in the Archaic period in Florida.

The burials at the Manasota Key Offshore site resemble those at the Windover Archeological Site, Little Salt Spring and other sites of the early Archaic period in Florida. The Manasota Key Offshore site is remarkable in its preservation even though it has been below sea level for close to 7,000 years.
