= Sarasota County, Florida =

County in Florida, United States

- U.S. county
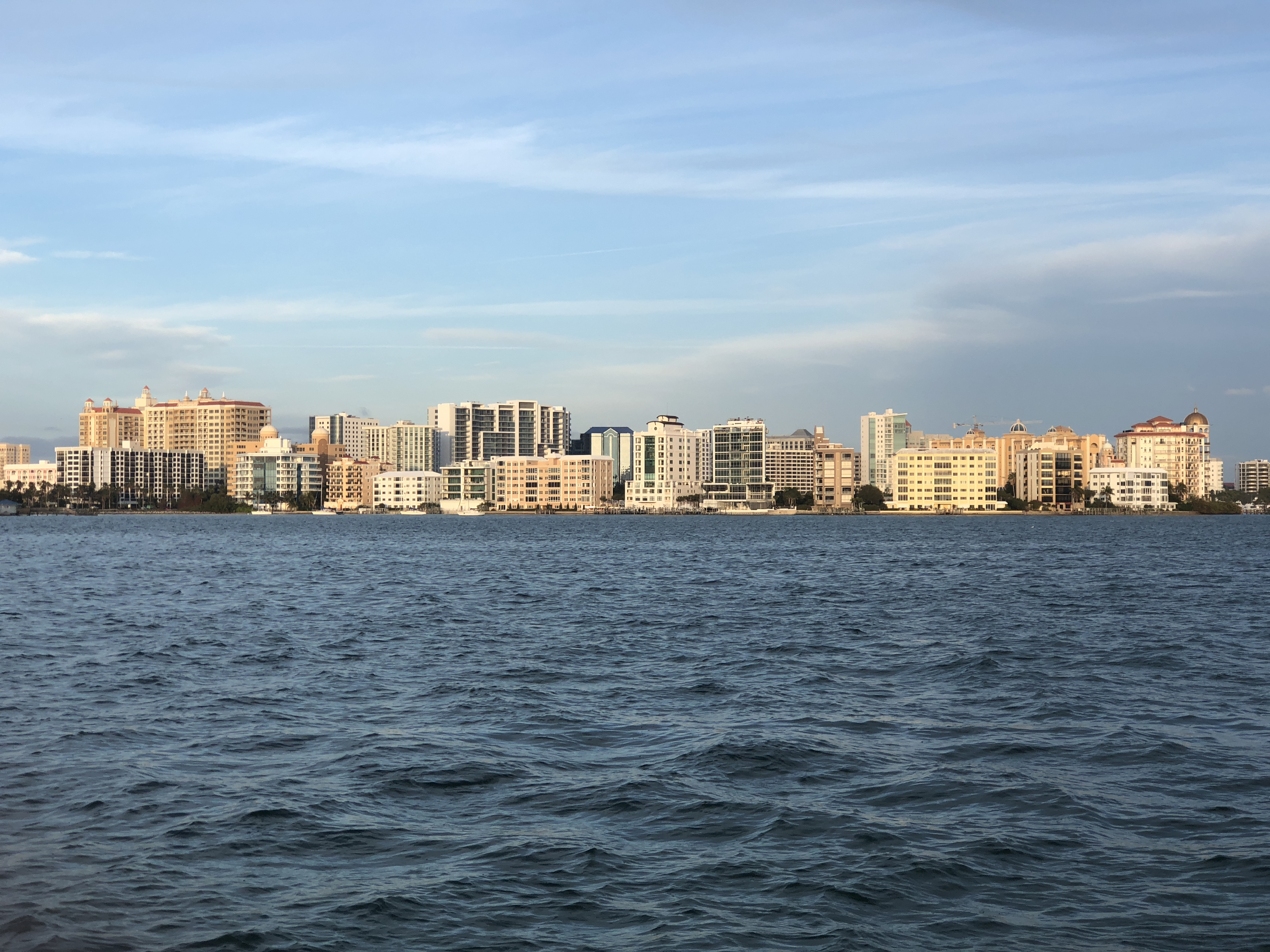
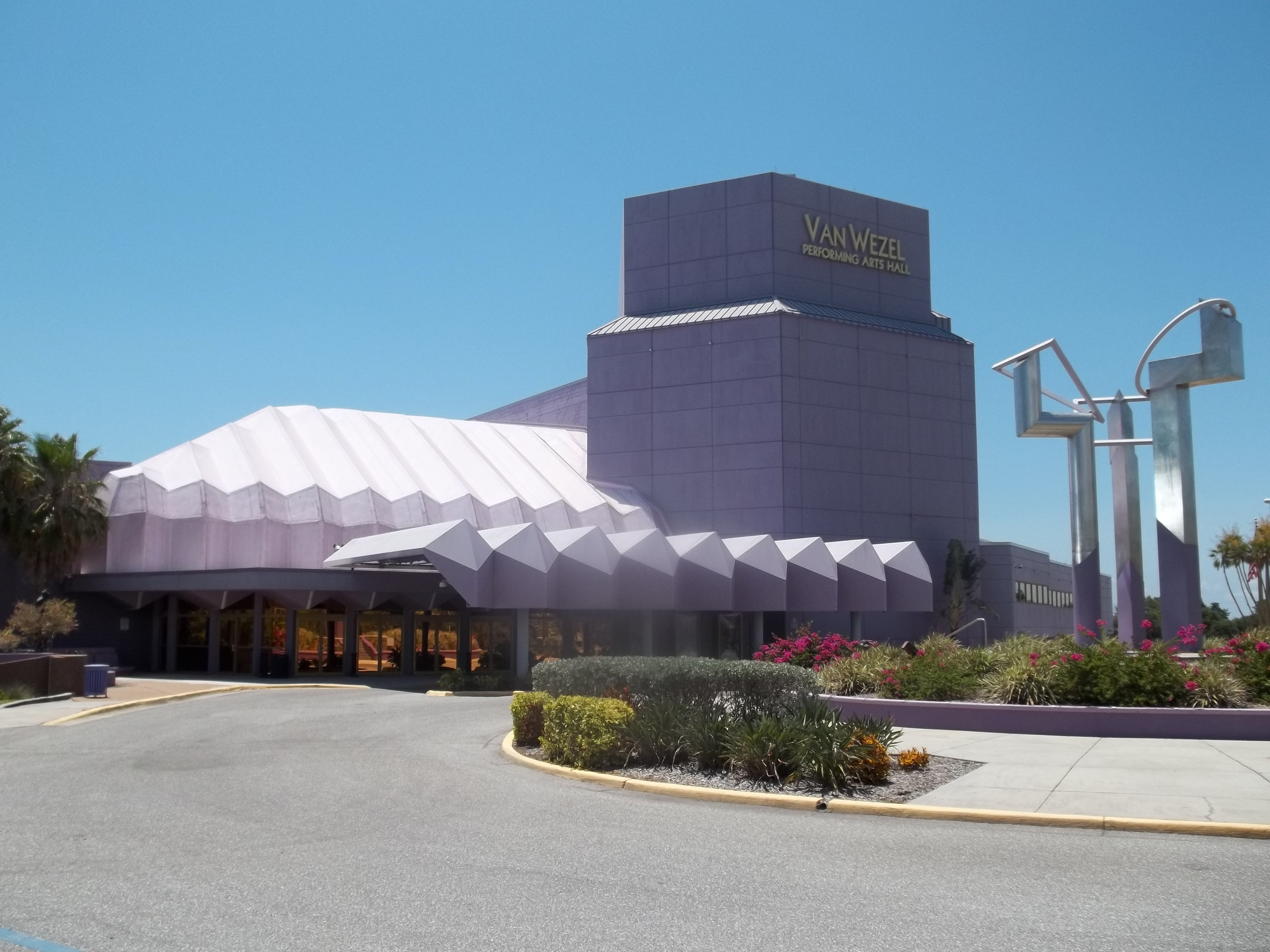
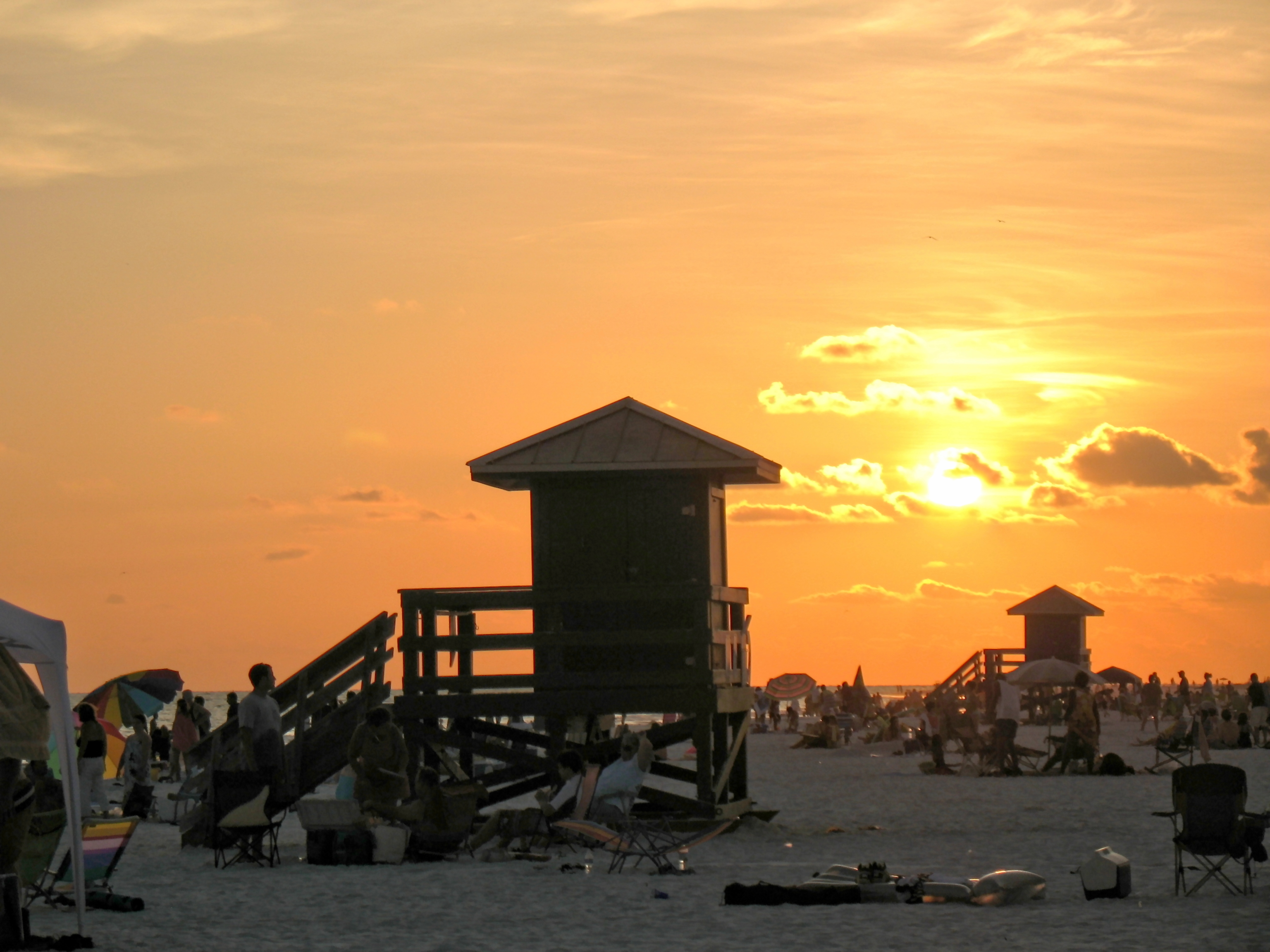
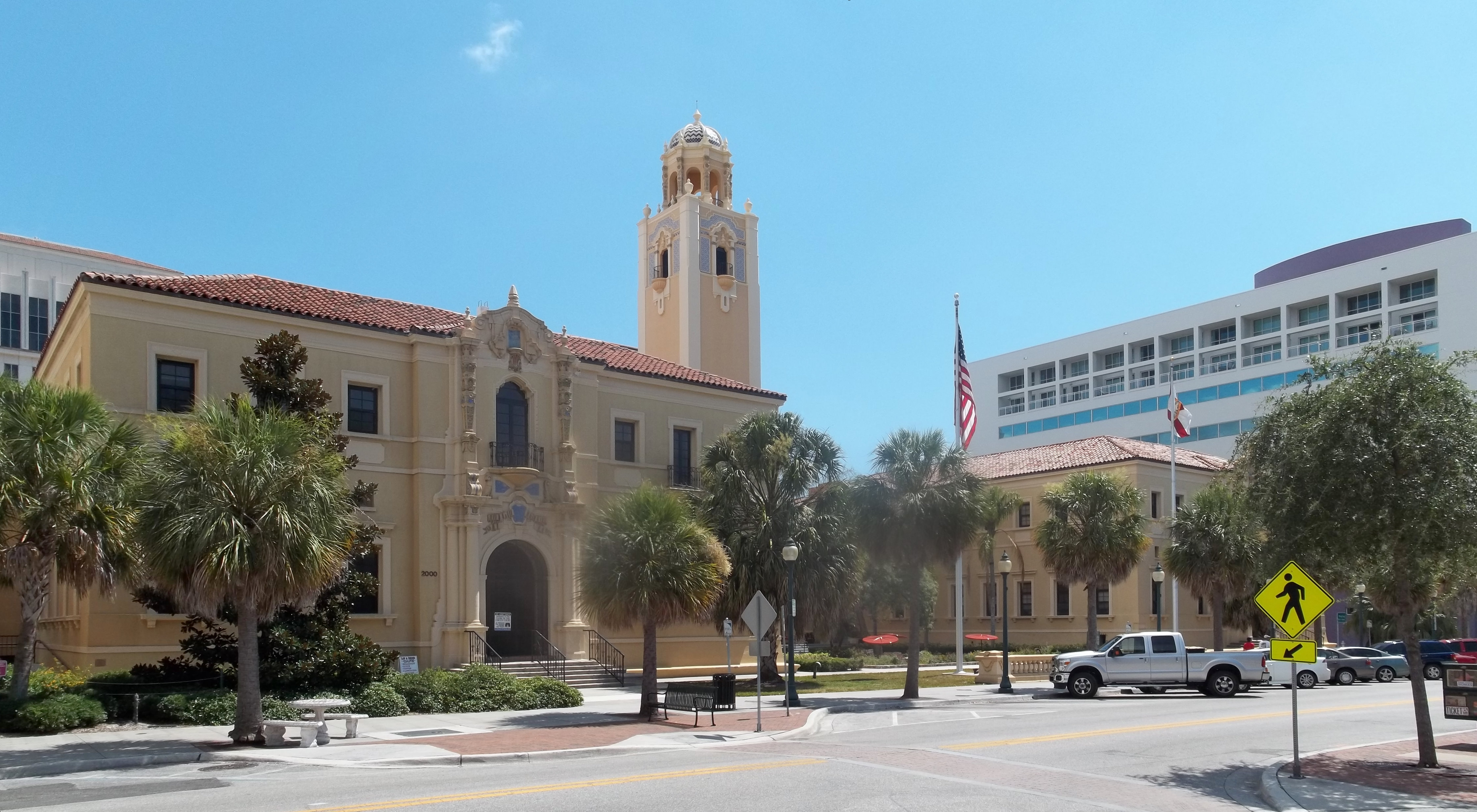
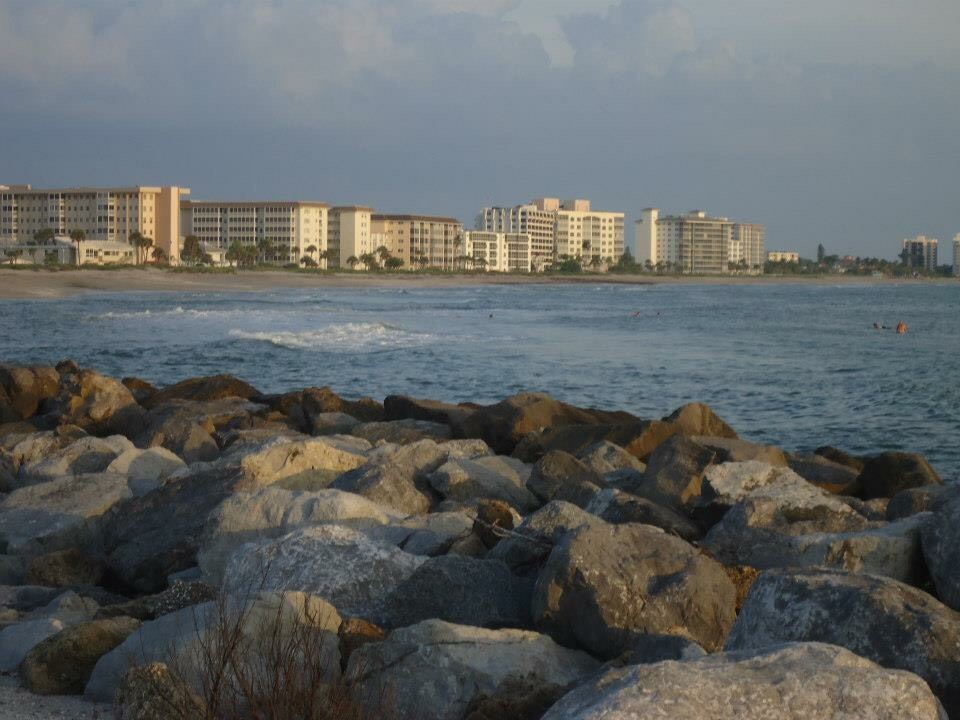
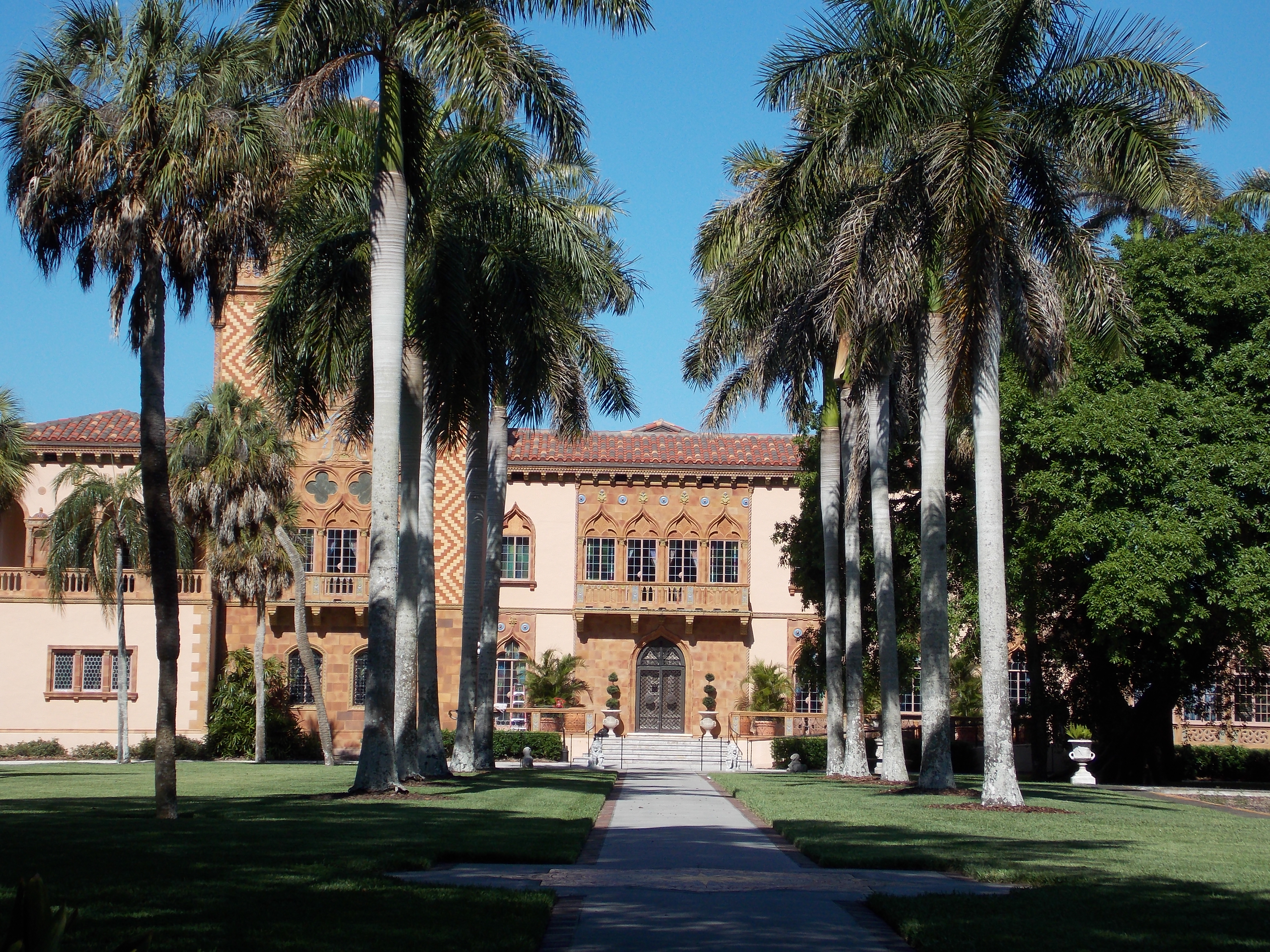
- Images, from top down, left to right: Sarasota, Florida skyline; Van Wezel Performing Arts Hall on Sarasota's Bayfront; Sunset at Siesta Beach; Sarasota County Courthouse; Beachfront on the Venice, Florida Beach; Front walkway of Ca' d'Zan

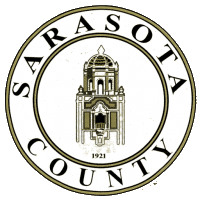
- Seal Logo

- Location within the U.S. state of Florida
- Coordinates: 27°11′N 82°22′W
- Country: United States
- State: Florida
- Founded: May 14, 1921
- Seat: Sarasota
- Largest city: North Port

Area
  - Total: 725 sq mi (1,880 km^{2})
  - Land: 556 sq mi (1,440 km^{2})
  - Water: 169 sq mi (440 km^{2}) 23.4%

Population (2020)
  - Total: 434,006
  - Estimate (2025): 479,958 ▲
  - Density: 781/sq mi (301/km^{2})
- Time zone: UTC−5 (Eastern)
  - Summer (DST): UTC−4 (EDT)
- ZIP Codes: 34223, 34229–34278, 34284–34289, 34292-34293, 34295
- Area code: 941
- Congressional district: 17th
- Website: www.scgov.net

Sarasota County is located in Southwest Florida along the Gulf Coast. At the 2020 United States census, the population was 434,006. Its county seat is Sarasota, Florida and its largest city is North Port, Florida. Sarasota County is part of the Sarasota metropolitan area. The county includes barrier islands with beaches and beach communities. It is home to colleges, a network of libraries, and various parks and preserves.

The area was home to indigenous peoples. Wealthy socialites including Bertha Palmer, who owned substantial lands in the area including what is now Palmer Ranch, established residences in the area. Agriculture included citrus and celery. Several historically African American neighborhoods were established, including the Rosemary District and Newtown. More recently, the North Port area has been fast growing including with Eastern European immigrants.

Sarasota is home to a library system, spring training facilities for the Baltimore Orioles, the Bobby Jones Golf Club, numerous parks and preserves, and waterways for boating, paddle-craft, and fishing. Sarasota has been a center of architecture, both Italianate and modern (Sarasota School of Architecture) as well as for visual arts and circus performers. The cities of Sarasota, Venice, and North Port are in the county as well as the town of Englewood, Florida, beach communities including Siesta Key, and unincorporated communities such as Nokomis and Osprey.

== History ==
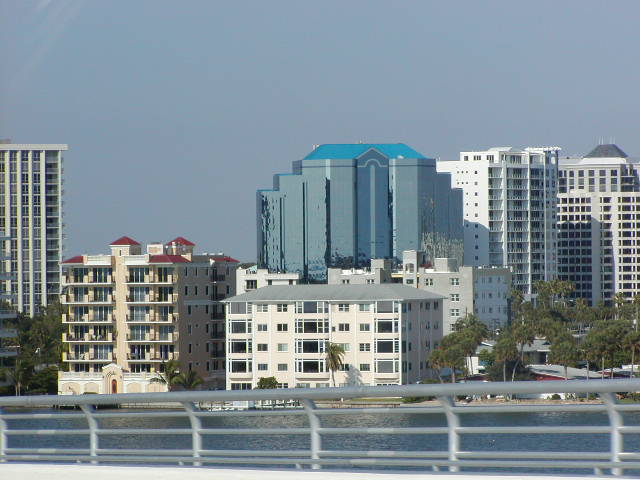
Downtown Sarasota, the county seat, from the John Ringling Causeway

The area that is now known as Sarasota County has been inhabited by humans for some 10,000 years. Evidence of human remains, as well as a burned out log at the Warm Mineral Springs in North Port, were discovered that date to the early Archaic period.

Although the name was associated with the area from the beginning of European contacts, the origin of the name "Sarasota" is unknown. An early map of the area from 1763 shows the word "Zarazote" across present-day Sarasota. In the early twentieth-century, a fanciful story was created to go hand-in-hand with a pageant held in Sarasota. The story held that the town was named after the daughter of famous explorer Hernando de Soto's daughter Sara.

Following Spanish exploration, the area was occupied by fishing camps, called ranchos. During the Second Seminole War, the area was occupied by the U.S. Army and Fort Armistead was built near Sarasota Bay. In 1842, the Armed Occupation Act was passed, which deeded land to settlers who were willing to cultivate and defend land in Florida. The act brought American settlers to Sarasota.

After acquisition of Florida Territory by the United States with the Adams–Onís Treaty in 1819, the area now included in Sarasota County had been part of St. Johns County (1821), Alachua County (1824), Hillsborough County (1834), and Manatee County (1855) as new counties were created from older counties to accommodate population growth and settlement in new areas. Sarasota County was created in 1921 from the southern part of Manatee County.

== Geography ==
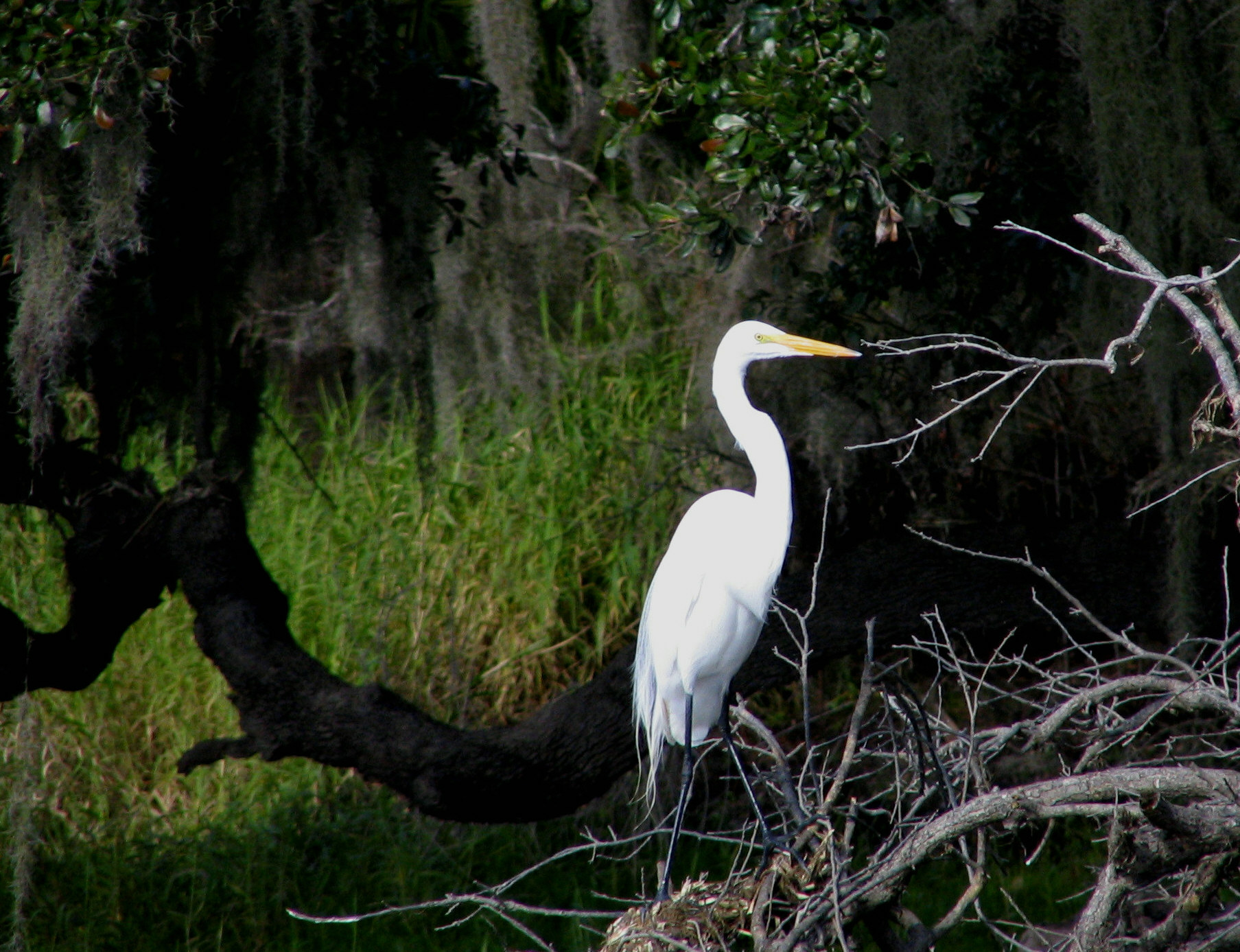
A great egret in Myakka River State Park

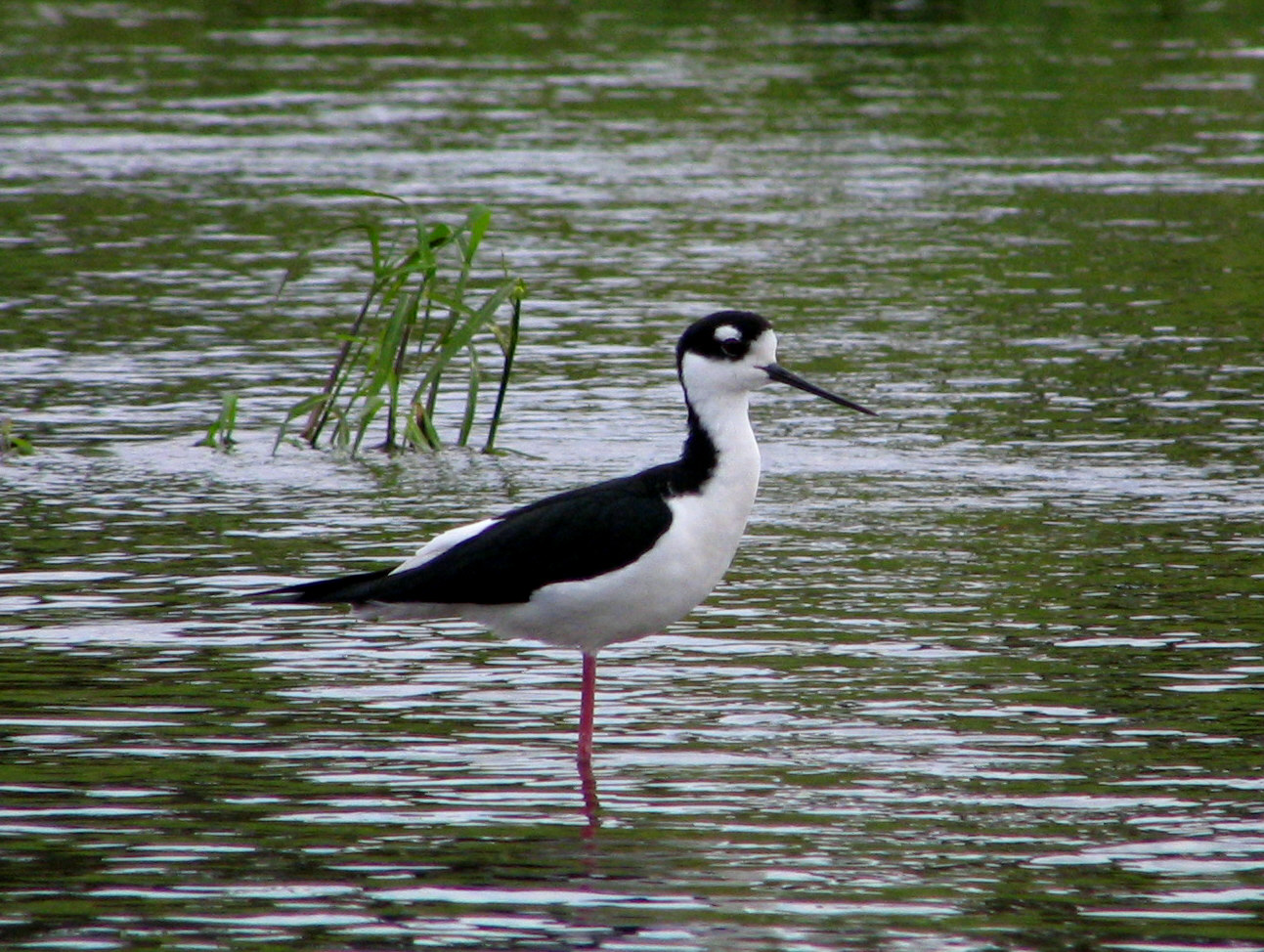
Black-necked stilt in Myakka River State Park

According to the U.S. Census Bureau, the county has a total area of 725 square miles (1,880 km^{2}), of which 556 square miles (1,440 km^{2}) is land and 169 square miles (440 km^{2}) (23.4%) is water.

=== Adjacent counties ===
- Manatee County – north
- DeSoto County – east
- Charlotte County – south

=== Parks and preserves ===
In addition to local parks there are several preserve areas including:

- Circus Hammock
- Curry Creek Preserve
- Deer Prairie Creek Preserve
- Jelks Preserve
- Legacy Trail, rail-to-trail linear path
- Manasota Scrub Preserve
- Myakkahatchee Creek Environmental Park
- Old Miakka Preserve
- Sleeping Turtles South
- Sleeping Turtles North
- T. Mabry Carlton Reserve
- Celery Fields
- Red Bug Slough Preserve
- Rothenbach Park
- Snook Haven

== Beaches ==
County beaches include Nokomis Beach on Casey Key, Siesta Key Beach on Siesta Key, and Manasota Beach on Manasota Key. Venice, Lido Key and Longboat Key also have beaches.

=== Climate ===
Sarasota County has a humid subtropical climate, bordering on a tropical savanna climate, with hot, humid summers and warm, drier winters. The high temperatures and high humidity in the summer regularly push the heat index over 100 °F (38 °C). There are distinct rainy and dry seasons, with the rainy season lasting from March to November and the dry season from December to February.

As is the case with all of Florida, Sarasota County is subject to Hurricanes. Notable recent storms impacting the county include Hurricane Charley in 2004, Hurricane Irma in 2017, and Hurricane Ian in 2022. In 2024, Hurricanes Debby and Helene caused serious flooding within the county despite making landfall over 200 miles to the north. Hurricane Milton made landfall in the county at Siesta Key on October 9, 2024, as a Category 3 hurricane.

Climate data for Sarasota, Florida (Sarasota–Bradenton International Airport), 1991–2020 normals, extremes 1911–present
| Month | Jan | Feb | Mar | Apr | May | Jun | Jul | Aug | Sep | Oct | Nov | Dec | Year |
|---|---|---|---|---|---|---|---|---|---|---|---|---|---|
| Record high °F (°C) | 91 (33) | 90 (32) | 91 (33) | 96 (36) | 98 (37) | 100 (38) | 101 (38) | 101 (38) | 98 (37) | 99 (37) | 92 (33) | 90 (32) | 101 (38) |
| Mean maximum °F (°C) | 82.6 (28.1) | 83.6 (28.7) | 86.1 (30.1) | 89.7 (32.1) | 93.4 (34.1) | 94.9 (34.9) | 95.2 (35.1) | 95.3 (35.2) | 94.0 (34.4) | 91.3 (32.9) | 87.2 (30.7) | 83.6 (28.7) | 96.6 (35.9) |
| Mean daily maximum °F (°C) | 72.5 (22.5) | 74.9 (23.8) | 78.2 (25.7) | 82.5 (28.1) | 87.5 (30.8) | 90.0 (32.2) | 91.1 (32.8) | 91.5 (33.1) | 90.2 (32.3) | 86.3 (30.2) | 80.0 (26.7) | 75.2 (24.0) | 83.3 (28.5) |
| Daily mean °F (°C) | 62.4 (16.9) | 64.8 (18.2) | 68.1 (20.1) | 72.6 (22.6) | 77.8 (25.4) | 81.8 (27.7) | 83.1 (28.4) | 83.4 (28.6) | 82.2 (27.9) | 77.3 (25.2) | 70.1 (21.2) | 65.2 (18.4) | 74.1 (23.4) |
| Mean daily minimum °F (°C) | 52.3 (11.3) | 54.6 (12.6) | 58.1 (14.5) | 62.7 (17.1) | 68.2 (20.1) | 73.6 (23.1) | 75.2 (24.0) | 75.3 (24.1) | 74.1 (23.4) | 68.3 (20.2) | 60.1 (15.6) | 55.2 (12.9) | 64.8 (18.2) |
| Mean minimum °F (°C) | 33.9 (1.1) | 37.5 (3.1) | 42.5 (5.8) | 49.2 (9.6) | 58.6 (14.8) | 68.3 (20.2) | 70.3 (21.3) | 71.7 (22.1) | 68.1 (20.1) | 55.3 (12.9) | 44.9 (7.2) | 38.9 (3.8) | 32.3 (0.2) |
| Record low °F (°C) | 23 (−5) | 21 (−6) | 30 (−1) | 37 (3) | 45 (7) | 52 (11) | 62 (17) | 60 (16) | 58 (14) | 40 (4) | 27 (−3) | 20 (−7) | 20 (−7) |
| Average precipitation inches (mm) | 2.79 (71) | 1.92 (49) | 2.85 (72) | 2.46 (62) | 2.58 (66) | 7.05 (179) | 7.39 (188) | 9.11 (231) | 6.00 (152) | 2.76 (70) | 1.81 (46) | 2.33 (59) | 49.05 (1,246) |
| Average precipitation days (≥ 0.01 in) | 8.5 | 6.8 | 6.4 | 5.1 | 6.0 | 12.8 | 15.6 | 17.5 | 13.7 | 7.0 | 5.6 | 7.6 | 112.6 |
Source: NOAA

== Government and politics ==
Sarasota County is one of only 20 Florida counties with its own charter, adopted in 1971. Sarasota County is governed by a five-member county commission. Each commissioner serves a four-year term and resides in and represents a single district.

Like most of Southwest Florida, Sarasota County has been a stronghold for the Republican Party. It was one of the first parts of Florida to begin to favor the Republicans over the Democrats. The last Democratic presidential candidate to carry the county was Franklin D. Roosevelt in 1944. The closest any Democratic candidate has come since was Barack Obama in 2008, who lost in the county by just 211 votes. The Republican edge has narrowed somewhat since the 1990s, however; Democrats have managed at least 40 percent of the vote in every election since 1996. Yet the county has seen trends towards the Republican party, alongside the rest of Florida, since 2020, with Donald Trump's 2024 victory in the county being the best performance by a Republican since 1988.

Republicans have historically dominated the county commission and all but two countywide elected positions. Democratic strength is concentrated in Sarasota, which has an all-Democratic city commission.

United States presidential election results for Sarasota County, Florida
| Year | Republican | | Democratic | | Third party(ies) | |
| Year | No. | % | No. | % | No. | % |
|---|---|---|---|---|---|---|
| 1924 | 187 | 40.48% | 204 | 44.16% | 71 | 15.37% |
| 1928 | 1,603 | 56.46% | 1,181 | 41.60% | 55 | 1.94% |
| 1932 | 667 | 25.86% | 1,912 | 74.14% | 0 | 0.00% |
| 1936 | 1,055 | 30.38% | 2,418 | 69.62% | 0 | 0.00% |
| 1940 | 1,672 | 30.71% | 3,773 | 69.29% | 0 | 0.00% |
| 1944 | 2,109 | 37.99% | 3,443 | 62.01% | 0 | 0.00% |
| 1948 | 3,559 | 49.95% | 2,302 | 32.31% | 1,264 | 17.74% |
| 1952 | 9,538 | 70.74% | 3,945 | 29.26% | 0 | 0.00% |
| 1956 | 13,937 | 73.40% | 5,052 | 26.60% | 0 | 0.00% |
| 1960 | 19,995 | 70.70% | 8,287 | 29.30% | 0 | 0.00% |
| 1964 | 21,917 | 61.13% | 13,937 | 38.87% | 0 | 0.00% |
| 1968 | 30,160 | 63.73% | 10,127 | 21.40% | 7,041 | 14.88% |
| 1972 | 48,939 | 79.95% | 12,235 | 19.99% | 36 | 0.06% |
| 1976 | 44,157 | 61.78% | 26,293 | 36.78% | 1,028 | 1.44% |
| 1980 | 68,065 | 68.57% | 25,621 | 25.81% | 5,579 | 5.62% |
| 1984 | 87,771 | 74.15% | 30,525 | 25.79% | 69 | 0.06% |
| 1988 | 84,602 | 66.40% | 42,099 | 33.04% | 708 | 0.56% |
| 1992 | 66,855 | 42.76% | 54,552 | 34.89% | 34,945 | 22.35% |
| 1996 | 69,213 | 46.46% | 63,665 | 42.73% | 16,108 | 10.81% |
| 2000 | 83,117 | 51.63% | 72,869 | 45.27% | 4,991 | 3.10% |
| 2004 | 104,692 | 53.51% | 88,442 | 45.20% | 2,518 | 1.29% |
| 2008 | 102,897 | 49.47% | 102,686 | 49.37% | 2,422 | 1.16% |
| 2012 | 110,504 | 53.14% | 95,119 | 45.74% | 2,338 | 1.12% |
| 2016 | 124,438 | 53.79% | 97,870 | 42.30% | 9,045 | 3.91% |
| 2020 | 148,370 | 54.71% | 120,110 | 44.29% | 2,689 | 0.99% |
| 2024 | 163,219 | 58.48% | 112,668 | 40.37% | 3,214 | 1.15% |

=== Public safety ===
Aside from the typical law enforcement and fire departments, Sarasota County also utilizes an Emergency Management agency. The agency's main area of focus is disaster preparedness and response. The agency is responsible for what are called Community Emergency Response Teams as well as the county emergency evacuation shelters.

==== Fire/EMS ====
The Sarasota County Fire Department (SCFD) provides fire services to the City of Sarasota and all unincorporated areas of the county with the exception of areas covered by the Nokomis and Englewood fire districts. Additionally, SCFD provides emergency medical services to the City of Sarasota, all unincorporated areas of the county (including areas covered by the Nokomis and Englewood fire districts), and the city of Venice.

==== Law enforcement ====
The Sarasota County Sheriff's Office (SSO) is the county's primary law enforcement agency. It is responsible for patrolling the unincorporated areas of the county along with operating the county's jail and providing courtroom security. SSO also operates the county's primary 911 center. The cities of Sarasota, North Port, and Venice along with the Town of Longboat Key each have their own police departments. The Florida Highway Patrol is responsible for patrolling FDOT maintained roads in the county (Florida State Highway System) and investigating motor vehicle accidents that occur in unincorporated areas.

Three specialist law enforcement agencies have jurisdiction in the county: the Sarasota-Bradenton International Airport Police Department, the New College/USF Sarasota-Manatee Campus Police Department, the Seminole Gulf Railway (SGLR) Police Department and the Sarasota County Schools Police Department. Each agency, except for the SCS Police Department, has jurisdiction in neighboring Manatee County as well, as each agency's properties extend into that county.

=== Voter registration ===
All voter information is since May 21, 2025 and provided by Florida Department of Elections:

==== Party statistics ====
| Party | Registered Voters | Percentage |
|---|---|---|
| Republican | 160,886 | 47.8% |
| Democratic | 85,666 | 25.45% |
| No party affiliation | 79,982 | 23.76% |
| Minor parties | 10,036 | 2.98% |
| Total Voters | 336,570 | 100.00% |

=== Government officials ===
==== United States Senate ====
| Office | Senator | Party |
|---|---|---|
| Class 1 Senator | Rick Scott | Republican |
| Class 3 Senator | Ashley Moody | Republican |

==== United States House of Representatives ====
| District | Representative | Party |
|---|---|---|
| Florida's 17th Congressional District | Greg Steube | Republican |

==== Florida State Senate ====
| District | Senator | Party |
|---|---|---|
| 23 | Joe Gruters | Republican |

==== Florida House of Representatives ====
| District | Representative | Party |
|---|---|---|
| 73 | Fiona McFarland | Republican |
| 74 | James Buchanan | Republican |
| 75 | Danny Nix | Republican |

==== Sarasota County Commission ====
The Board of County Commissioners include the following:

| Position | Incumbent |
|---|---|
| District 1 | Teresa Mast |
| District 2 | Mark Smith |
| District 3 | Tom Knight |
| District 4 | Joe Neunder |
| District 5 | Ron Cutsinger |

==== Sarasota County School Board ====
The School Board members include the following:

| Position | Incumbent |
|---|---|
| District 1 | Bridget Ziegler |
| District 2 | Liz Barker |
| District 3 | Tom Edwards |
| District 4 | Robyn A. Marinelli |
| District 5 | Tim Enos |

== Transportation ==
=== Airports ===
- Sarasota-Bradenton International Airport, in Manatee County (runway), Sarasota County (terminal), and Sarasota.
- Venice Municipal Airport, a general aviation airport in Venice.
- Hidden River Airport, a private airport in the eastern part of the county.
- Buchan Airport, in Englewood.

=== Major highways and state roads ===
- Interstate 75 – north–south limited-access freeway, and has ten interchanges within Sarasota County. A major north–south highway in Sarasota County. It is a high-speed connection with other cities such as Tampa, Florida and Fort Myers, Florida. In Venice, Interstate 75 turns east, passing through North Port, before again turning south to cross Charlotte Harbor.
- U.S. Highway 41 – The main north–south road through the county is known as Tamiami Trail. It was created in the 1920s to connect Tampa with Miami, hence the contracted name.
- U.S. Highway 301 – This highway begins in the city of Sarasota with an intersection at US-41 just south of Downtown Sarasota, and runs north–south through the county.
- State Road 72 – Stickney Point Road and Clark Road
- State Road 681 – Venice Connector, this road was formerly the southern terminus of Interstate 75 in the early 1980s
- State Road 758 – Midnight Pass Road, Higel Avenue, Siesta Drive, South Osprey Avenue, Bee Ridge Road
- State Road 776 – Englewood Road/North Indiana Avenue
- State Road 777 – River Road from US-41 to I-75
- State Road 789 – Begins at an intersection with US-41 at the Sarasota Bayfront, going west across the Ringling Bridge, connecting to St. Armands Key, before turning north and becoming Gulf of Mexico Drive on Longboat Key, Florida
- State Road 780 – Fruitville Road

=== Public transportation ===
- Breeze Transit provides public transportation for Sarasota County, Florida. SCAT is operated by Sarasota County. It maintains 19 fixed-line bus routes plus a dial-a-ride paratransit service (SCAT Plus).

== Demographics ==
Historical population
| Census | Pop. | Note | %± |
|---|---|---|---|
| 1930 | 12,440 | | — |
| 1940 | 16,106 | | 29.5% |
| 1950 | 28,827 | | 79.0% |
| 1960 | 76,895 | | 166.7% |
| 1970 | 120,413 | | 56.6% |
| 1980 | 202,251 | | 68.0% |
| 1990 | 277,776 | | 37.3% |
| 2000 | 325,957 | | 17.3% |
| 2010 | 379,448 | | 16.4% |
| 2020 | 434,006 | | 14.4% |
| 2025 (est.) | 479,958 | ▲ | 10.6% |
U.S. Decennial Census; 1790–1960 1900–1990; 1990–2000 2010-2020

=== Racial and ethnic composition ===
Sarasota County, Florida – Racial and ethnic composition Note: the US Census treats Hispanic/Latino as an ethnic category. This table excludes Latinos from the racial categories and assigns them to a separate category. Hispanics/Latinos may be of any race.
| Race / Ethnicity (NH = Non-Hispanic) | Pop 1980 | Pop 1990 | Pop 2000 | Pop 2010 | Pop 2020 | % 1980 | % 1990 | % 2000 | % 2010 | % 2020 |
|---|---|---|---|---|---|---|---|---|---|---|
| White alone (NH) | 187,742 | 258,095 | 292,603 | 321,978 | 349,700 | 92.83% | 92.91% | 89.77% | 84.85% | 80.57% |
| Black or African American alone (NH) | 10,352 | 11,855 | 13,254 | 17,036 | 16,165 | 5.12% | 4.27% | 4.07% | 4.49% | 3.72% |
| Native American or Alaska Native alone (NH) | 272 | 471 | 623 | 667 | 695 | 0.13% | 0.17% | 0.19% | 0.18% | 0.16% |
| Asian alone (NH) | 704 | 1,394 | 2,506 | 4,818 | 8,407 | 0.35% | 0.50% | 0.77% | 1.27% | 1.94% |
| Native Hawaiian or Pacific Islander alone (NH) | x | x | 71 | 102 | 168 | x | x | 0.02% | 0.03% | 0.04% |
| Other race alone (NH) | 192 | 79 | 312 | 545 | 1,902 | 0.09% | 0.03% | 0.10% | 0.14% | 0.44% |
| Mixed race or Multiracial (NH) | x | x | 2,446 | 4,269 | 13,733 | x | x | 0.75% | 1.13% | 3.16% |
| Hispanic or Latino (any race) | 2,989 | 5,882 | 14,142 | 30,033 | 43,236 | 1.48% | 2.12% | 4.34% | 7.91% | 9.96% |
| Total | 202,251 | 277,776 | 325,957 | 379,448 | 434,006 | 100.00% | 100.00% | 100.00% | 100.00% | 100.00% |

=== 2020 census ===
As of the 2020 census, the county had a population of 434,006. The median age was 57.6 years. 13.7% of residents were under the age of 18 and 37.6% of residents were 65 years of age or older. For every 100 females there were 91.1 males, and for every 100 females age 18 and over there were 89.1 males age 18 and over.

3.5% of residents were under the age of five and 52.4% were female.

The racial makeup of the county was 82.7% White, 3.9% Black or African American, 0.3% American Indian and Alaska Native, 2.0% Asian, <0.1% Native Hawaiian and Pacific Islander, 3.3% from some other race, and 7.7% from two or more races. Hispanic or Latino residents of any race comprised 10.0% of the population.

97.6% of residents lived in urban areas, while 2.4% lived in rural areas.

There were 200,211 households in the county, of which 16.9% had children under the age of 18 living in them. Of all households, 49.3% were married-couple households, 16.3% were households with a male householder and no spouse or partner present, and 27.8% were households with a female householder and no spouse or partner present. About 31.3% of all households were made up of individuals and 19.5% had someone living alone who was 65 years of age or older.

There were 253,231 housing units, of which 20.9% were vacant. Among occupied housing units, 76.1% were owner-occupied and 23.9% were renter-occupied. The homeowner vacancy rate was 2.4% and the rental vacancy rate was 15.6%.

The median household income was $64,644 with a per capita income of $44,402. 8.7% of population below the poverty threshold. The median value of owner-occupied housing-units between 2016 and 2020 was $269,300 and the median gross rent was $1,342.

There were 41,215 veterans living in the county. 12.2% of the population was foreign born. 93.2% of the population that was 25 years or older had completed a high school education, and 36.4% of those 25 years or older had a bachelor's degree or higher.

As of 2020, according to the Association of Religion Data Archives (ARDA), the percentage of religious affiliations in Sarasota County were:

| Religion or denomination | Percentage of adherents |
|---|---|
| Catholic | 27.1% |
| Evangelical Protestant | 18% |
| Mainline Protestant | 5.3% |
| Other | 1.6% |
| Judaism | 1.1% |
| Black Protestant | 0.7% |
| Buddhism | 0.2% |
| Hinduism | 0.2% |
| Orthodox | 0.2% |
| Islam | 0.1% |

== Economy ==
=== Top employers ===
As of 2024, the top employers for Sarasota County are as follows:

1. Sarasota Memorial Health Care System - 10,597
2. School Board of Sarasota County - 6,445
3. Publix Super Markets - 2,812
4. Sarasota County Government - 2,615
5. PGT Innovations - 1,442
6. Walmart - 900
7. City of North Port - 900
8. City of Sarasota - 875
9. Target - 636
10. Lowe's Home Centers - 555

== Sports and recreation ==
Sarasota County is home to Ed Smith Stadium, where the Baltimore Orioles have spring training. The Orioles also have minor league facilities at Twin Lakes Park. In January 2017, the Braves announced a formal agreement to move their spring training home to North Port. CoolToday Park opened on March 24, 2019.

Sarasota County is home to the Sarasota Paradise, a soccer team established in 2023, competing in USL League Two. The team played its first two seasons at Cleland Stadium at Ihrig Field at Sarasota High. In its 2024 season the Sarasota Paradise took home a division championship and qualified for playoffs for the first time in the team's history on July 15, 2024. The City of Sarasota recognized August 19, 2024, as Sarasota Paradise Day to commemorate the achievement. The Sarasota Paradise team will compete in USL League One in the 2026 season.

Sarasota County is also home to Nathan Benderson Park. The facility has played host to the 2017 World Rowing Championships and World Rowing events in 2018 and 2019. It has also been the host of the 2016 Olympic Time Trials - Rowing and the delayed 2020 Olympic rowing time trials. NBP has also been the site of multiple NCAA national rowing championship regattas, the USRowing Youth National Championships, and other rowing regattas and dragon boat festivals since 2011. The park will host the 2021 U.S. Dragon Boat Federation National Championships and the 2022 International Dragon Boat Federation Club Crew World Championships, after holding the 2014 International Breast Cancer Paddlers Commission world regatta.

Nathan Benderson Park is also the site of Olympic qualifying events in triathlon and paratriathlon, with several ITU Triathlon World Cup and Americas Triathlon Cup events over the years. Numerous community running and walking events, music and food festivals and other community events are held in the park, including the annual NBP Fireworks On The Lake, held every July 3, and NBP Trick Or Treat On The Lake, held the last week of October.

== Education ==
=== Primary and secondary education ===
- Sarasota County Public Schools – public K–12 School district serving all of Sarasota County

=== Higher education ===
- New College of Florida – public liberal arts college. Honors college of the state of Florida
- Ringling College of Art and Design – private, four-year, not-for-profit, fully accredited college with concentrations in art and design
- State College of Florida, Manatee–Sarasota – South Venice Campus of SCF
- University of South Florida Sarasota-Manatee – branch campus of USF
- Florida State University College of Medicine – branch campus for third- and fourth-year medical students and physician assistant students in clinical years

=== Museums and libraries ===
Library branches:

- Betty J. Johnson North Sarasota Public Library
- Elsie Quirk Public Library
- Frances T. Bourne Jacaranda Public Library
- Fruitville Public Library
- Gulf Gate Public Library
- Jacaranda Library
- North Port Public Library
- Osprey Public Library at the Historic Spanish Point
- Selby Public Library
- Shannon Staub Library
- William H. Jervey, Jr. Venice Public Library

Sarasota County residents may obtain library cards for free and valid library cards may be used to check out materials at all ten Sarasota County libraries. Manatee and Charlotte County residents, as well as library users from any of the Tampa Bay Library Consortium libraries, may register as reciprocal borrowers and check out materials in Sarasota County. Non-resident cards are available for purchase and offer the same privileges as resident cards.

The library system provides a variety of services which include adult, teen and children's materials. Computers for public use are available at all ten Sarasota County Libraries and free wireless access in the libraries is provided by the Sarasota County Government. The library system has licensing to CloudLibrary, Hoopla and Freegal Music. On April 27, 2022, Sarasota County Libraries migrated all digital content to from Overdrive to CloudLibrary to provide a fuller, more streamlined digital collection and discontinued using Overdrive. Ask a Librarian, the on-line Florida librarian reference system is available through the Sarasota County Public Library System. Sarasota County residents have access to the Pinellas Talking Book Library as well as a Books-by-Mail service. The Selby Public Library has been a selective depository in the Federal Depository Library Program and receives almost 50% of the government publications distributed through the program. Additionally, the Sarasota County Library System is an organization member of the Florida Library Association.

The Little Free Library program was introduced to Sarasota County in 2014 as the result of a collaborative effort between the Libraries and Historical Resources department, the Parks, Recreation and Natural Resources department and the Sarasota County Extension and Sustainability department. The Sarasota County Little Free Libraries have been placed at thirteen county parks and recreation centers.

==== History ====
The first library was established in 1907 by the Sarasota Town Improvement Society. County libraries have been established in response to community demands and needs. The first libraries were autonomous with the head librarians reporting directly to the county administrator. Sarasota Public Library was managed by Betty Service, the Englewood library by Harriet Ives, and Venice by Jean McGuire. Joan Hopkins directed and coordinated library services for the rapidly growing population. She directed the establishment of Gulf Gate Public Library, North Port Public Library, Frances T. Bourne Jacaranda Public Library and the new downtown Sarasota library, and laid the groundwork for building future libraries in the county.

In November 2023, the Sarasota County Board of Commissioners voted to cease the Sarasota County library system's membership with the American Library Association and the Florida Library Association, referencing concern over Marxist influences and that the associations were "acting like political action committees."

== Local media ==
=== Newspapers ===
- Sarasota Herald Tribune – primarily serves Sarasota County for news, but also serves Manatee, Charlotte and DeSoto counties. Circulation is 110,817 daily and 132,185 on Sunday (2005 averages)
- Sarasota Magazine
- North Port Sun – an edition of the Charlotte Sun newspapers
- Observer Media Group newspapers: East County Observer, Longboat Observer, Sarasota Observer, Siesta Key Observer
- The Sarasota News Leader – online weekly news
- Venice Gondolier Sun

=== Magazines ===
- Scene Magazine, a civic, business and social publication serving Sarasota and Manatee counties.
- Bradenton magazine
- SRQ magazine
- Sarasota Scene magazine

=== Television ===
Sarasota County is part of the Tampa/St. Petersburg/Sarasota DMA; however, the following stations have facilities located in the county:

- WWSB – a local ABC affiliate based in Sarasota, which serves as the primary ABC affiliate for Sarasota County and a secondary ABC affiliate for the rest of the Tampa/St. Petersburg/Sarasota DMA
- WSNN-LD – local twenty-four-hour news station based in Sarasota
- Various government and local access channels: Access 19 (Local Government channel), Education Channel (School Board) and BLAB TV (local programming)

Television stations serving all or part of Sarasota County but located in Saint Petersburg or Tampa include:

- WTVT - the local Fox affiliate based in Tampa
- WFLA - the local NBC affiliate based in Tampa
- WTSP - the local CBS affiliate based in St. Petersburg
- WFTS - the primary ABC affiliate for the Tampa/St. Petersburg/Sarasota DMA, based in St. Petersburg

=== Radio ===
- WCTQ – (92.1 and 103.1 Country)
- WSLR-LP – (96.5 Community Radio)
- WSDV - (103.9 Top-40)

== Communities ==
=== Cities ===
- North Port
- Sarasota
- Venice

=== Town ===
- Longboat Key (part)

=== Census-designated places ===
- Bee Ridge
- Desoto Acres
- Desoto Lakes
- Fruitville
- Gulf Gate Estates
- Kensington Park
- Lake Sarasota
- Lakewood Ranch (part)
- Laurel
- Nokomis
- North Sarasota
- Old Miakka
- Osprey
- Palmer Ranch
- Pinecraft
- Plantation
- Ridge Wood Heights
- Sarasota Springs
- Siesta Key
- South Gate Ridge
- South Sarasota
- South Venice
- Southgate
- The Meadows
- Vamo
- Venice Gardens
- Warm Mineral Springs

=== Other unincorporated communities ===
- Manasota Key (Part)
- Wellen Park
- Woodmere
- Verna
- Hi Hat Ranch

== See also ==
- National Register of Historic Places listings in Sarasota County, Florida
- Sarasota National Cemetery
